= List of Zimbabwean politicians =

This is a list of Zimbabwean politicians. It includes current and former politicians of the African nation of Zimbabwe and major politicians of its predecessor states.

== A ==
- Jock Alves (c. 1909–1979), Rhodesian Front politician; and former mayor of Salisbury (now Harare)
- Mike Auret (1936–2020), human rights activist and former MDC MP

== B ==
- Canaan Banana (1936–2003), ZANU politician; first President of Zimbabwe
- Gift Banda (born 1969), deputy mayor of Bulawayo
- Roy Bennett (1957–2018), former MDC–T MP and senator
- Michael Bimha (born 1954), MP and cabinet minister
- Flora Buka (born 1968), MP and cabinet minister
- David Butau (born 1957), MP
- P. K. van der Byl (1923-1999), MP and minister

== C ==
- Aeneas Chigwedere (1939–2021), former Minister of Education and Governor of Mashonaland East Province
- James Chikerema (1925–2006), president of the Front for the Liberation of Zimbabwe, later served as MP
- Chenhanho Chimutengwende (born 1943), former Minister of State for Public and Interactive Affairs
- Ruth Chinamano (1925–2005), ZANU–PF MP
- Christopher Chingosho (born 1952), ZANU–PF MP and deputy minister
- Joseph Chinotimba (born 1958), political figure associated to the ZANU–PF party
- Jeremiah Chirau (1923–1985), leader of the Zimbabwe United People's Organisation
- Herbert Chitepo (1923–1975), leader of the Zimbabwe African National Union until his assassination
- George Chiweshe (born 1953), former brigadier general and Chairperson of the Zimbabwe Electoral Commission
- Fay Chung (born 1941), former Minister of Education
- Guy Clutton-Brock (1906–1995), English farmer and social worker who became a founding member of the Southern Rhodesia African National Congress
- Charles Coghlan (1863–1927), Prime Minister of Southern Rhodesia, leader of Rhodesia Party
- David Coltart (born 1957), human rights lawyer, former Minister of Education, founding member of the Movement for Democratic Change
- Stuart Comberbach (born 1952), diplomat and politician

== D ==
- Dumiso Dabengwa (1939–2019), President of the Zimbabwe African People's Union
- Margaret Dongo (born 1960), former independent member of Parliament, founder of the Zimbabwe Union of Democrats
- Fletcher Dulini Ncube (1940–2014), founding member of the Movement for Democratic Change (1999-2005)
- Enoch Dumbutshena (1920–2000), Zimbabwe's first black judge, Chief Justice from 1984 to 1990
- Clifford Dupont (1905–1978), first President of Rhodesia

== E ==
- Henry Everard (1897–1980), president of Rhodesia

== F ==
- Winston Field (1904–1969), seventh Prime Minister of Southern Rhodesia, co-founder of the Rhodesian Front political party

== G ==
- Tony Gara (1939–2006), former mayor of Harare, MP, and deputy minister
- Aguy Georgias (1935–2015), former deputy minister
- Border Gezi (1964–2001), former Minister for Gender, Youth and Employment, and former Resident Minister and Governor for Mashonaland Central
- Herbert Gomba (born c. 1977), current mayor of Harare
- Josiah Gondo (?–1972), former MP
- Aleck Gumbo (born 1940), former Minister of Economic Development
- Josiah Zion Gumede (1919–1989), first and only President of Zimbabwe Rhodesia
- Tizirai Gwata (born 1943), first black mayor of Harare
- Munyaradzi Gwisai (born 1968), former MDC–T MP

== H ==
- William John Harper (1916-2006), cabinet minister and MP
- Byron Hove (1940–1999) former justice minister and ZANU-PF MP
- Jack Howman (1919-2000), former minister and MP
- Godfrey Huggins (1883–1971), former Prime Minister of Southern Rhodesia and Prime Minister of the Federation of Rhodesia and Nyasaland and leader of United Rhodesia Party
- Chenjerai "Hitler" Hunzvi (1949–2001), former chairman of the Zimbabwe National Liberation War Veterans Association

== J ==
- Tichaona Jokonya (1938–2006), former Minister of Information and Publicity of Zimbabwe
- Learnmore Jongwe (1974–2002), former spokesman and MP for the MDC

== K ==
- Iain Kay (born 1949), former MDC-T MP
- Jock Kay (1921–?), former ZANU-PF MP and deputy minister
- Simon Khaya-Moyo (1945–2021), former ZANU-PF MP, cabinet minister, chairman of ZANU-PF, and ambassador to South Africa
- Nicholas Kitikiti (born ?), ambassador to Iran and former secretary of state
- Patrick Kombayi (1938–2009), MDC-T senator and former mayor of Gweru
- Wilson Kumbula (born 1937), ZANU-PF MP

== L ==
- Desmond Lardner-Burke (1909–1984), MP and cabinet minister

== M ==
- Lovemore Madhuku (born 1966), NCA leader
- Moven Mahachi (1948–2001), former Minister of Defence and ZANU-PF MP
- Charles Shanyurai Majange(born ?), Pan-African Parliament MP
- Alfred Makwarimba (born ?), president of the Zimbabwe Federation of Trade Unions
- Washington Malianga (1926–2014), one of the founding members of ZANU and party secretary
- Tabetha Kanengoni Malinga (born 1982), former deputy minister, minister of state, and MP
- Witness Mangwende (1946–2005), former cabinet minister and governor of Harare province
- Elliot Manyika (1955–2008), minister without Portfolio and National political Commissar for ZANU-PF
- Muchadeyi Masunda (born 1952), former mayor of Harare
- Cain Mathema (born 1947), ambassador to Zambia, minister without portfolio, and former governor of Bulawayo
- Lovemore Matombo (?–2020), former president of the Zimbabwe Congress of Trade Unions
- Bright Matonga (born ?), cabinet minister and ZANU-PF MP
- Isaac Matongo (1947–2007), activist
- Amos Midzi (1952–2015), former cabinet minister and MP
- Priscilla Misihairabwi-Mushonga (born ?), ambassador to Sweden, minister, and MP
- George Mitchell (1867-1937), former Prime Minister of Southern Rhodesia, leader of the Responsible Government Association or Rhodesian Party
- Paul Tangi Mhova Mkondo (1945–2013), ZANU–PF treasurer
- Promise Mkwananzi (born ?), former president of the Zimbabwe National Student Union
- Auxillia Mnangagwa (born 1963), current first lady of Zimbabwe, and former member of parliament
- Emmerson Mnangagwa (born 1942), current president of Zimbabwe, former cabinet minister and Speaker of Parliament
- Tongai Mnangagwa (born 1978), ZANU-PF MP
- Max Mnkandla (born ?), President of the Zimbabwe Liberators' Peace Initiative
- Raj Modi (born 1959), MP and deputy minister of industry and commerce
- Howard Unwin Moffat (1869–1951), former Premier of Southern Rhodesia, leader of Rhodesian Party
- Swithun Mombeshora (1945–2003), former state minister
- Jonathan Moyo (born 1957), MP and former state minister
- Wilbert Mubaiwa, presidential candidate and leader of the NPC party
- Simbi Mubako (born ?), former ambassador to the United States
- Olivia Muchena (born 1946), former cabinet minister
- Opa Muchinguri (born 1958), government minister
- Elias Mudzuri (born ?), Ministry of Energy and Power Development and former mayor of Harare
- Grace Mugabe (born 1965), former first lady of Zimbabwe
- Robert Mugabe (1924–2019), former President of Zimbabwe and leader of ZANU-PF
- Sally Mugabe (1931–1992), former first lady of Zimbabwe
- Joyce Mujuru (born 1955), founder and president of the National People's Party former first vice-president,
- Solomon Mujuru (1945–2011), former second gentleman of Zimbabwe and commander of the Zimbabwe Defence Forces
- Elphas Mukonoweshuro (1953–2011), former MDC-T MP and Minister of Public Service
- Samuel Mumbengegwi (1942–2016), Minister of Higher Education and ZANU-PF Chairperson
- Chris Mushohwe (born 1954), Resident Minister and Governor of Manicaland Province, senator, and former minister of information and broadcasting services
- Arthur Mutambara (born 1966), former deputy prime minister, leader of MDC-M party (born 1966)
- Charles Mutasa (born ?), Economic, Social and Cultural Council Vice-President
- Munacho Mutezo (born 1954), former Minister of Energy and Power Development, ZANU-PF MP, and founding member and vice-president of the Party Zimbabwe People First (ZimPF)
- Giles Mutsekwa (born 1948), home affairs minister and MP
- Simon Muzenda (1922–2003), former Vice-President of Zimbabwe, minister of foreign affairs, and deputy prime minister
- Abel Muzorewa (1925–2010), first and only Prime Minister of Zimbabwe-Rhodesia

== N ==
- Prag Lalloo Naran (1926–1981) leading member of the Zimbabwe Asian Community
- Japhet Ndabeni Ncube (born ?), commissioner at the Zimbabwean Human Rights Commission and chairs the Thematic Working group on Socio-Economic and Cultural Rights
- Welshman Ncube (born 1961), vice-president of Citizens Coalition for Change, founder and former leader of the MDC-N, and Minister of Industry and Commerce
- Francis Nhema (born 1959) ZANU-PF MP and former government minister
- Naomi Nhiwatiwa (1941–2012), former deputy minister
- Enos Nkala (1932–2013) one of the founders of ZANU and former minister
- Martin K. Moyo (1952), former mayor of Bulawayo
- Denis Norman (1931–2019) former government minister
- Maurice Nyagumbo (1924–1989), former minister and party secretary for ZANU
- Mike Nyambuya (born 1955), former governor of Manicaland, minister, and general
- George Nyandoro (1926–1994), one of the founders of SRANC and activist

== P ==
- Mark Partridge (1922–2007), former Rhodesian cabinet minister and member of both the Rhodesian and Zimbabwean parliaments

== R ==
- Engelbert Rugeje (born 1962) former commissar for ZANU-PF, general officer and Chief of Staff
- Tinos Rusere (1945–2007) trade union activist, former ZANU-PF MP, and deputy minister

== S ==
- Thompson Samkange (1893–1956), founder of the Bantu National Congress and former UANC leader
- Oliver Saunyama (?–1980), ZANU representative to Botswana
- Nathan Shamuyarira (1928–2014), former minister
- Daniel Shumba (born ?), former ZANU-PF deputy secretary of transport and welfare and MP
- Felix Magalela Mafa Sibanda (born 1951), MDC-T MP
- Jabulani Sibanda (born ?), former ZNLWVA chairman
- Nkululeko Sibanda (born 1979), former ZINASU president
- Ndabaningi Sithole (1920–2000), former MP, founder of Zimbabwe African National Union (ZANU) and later ZANU-Ndonga
- David Smith (1922–1996), former deputy prime minister of Rhodesia, minister of Rhodesia, Zimbabwe Rhodesia, and Zimbabwe
- Ian Smith (1919–2007), former Prime Minister of Rhodesia, leader of Rhodesian Front and Conservative Alliance of Zimbabwe
- Lance Bales Smith (1910–2000), former MP and minister
- Ronald Snapper (born ?), secretary of the Inter-territorial Organization for Eurafrican Organizations in Rhodesia
- Timothy Stamps (1936–2017), former ZANU–PF MP and minister of health
- Trudy Stevenson (1944–2018), former MP and ambassador to Senegal and the Gambia
- Wally Stuttaford (born ?), former MP
- Rubidge Stumbles (1904-1978), former minister and MP

== T ==
- Leopold Takawira (1916–1970), former ZANU Vice-President
- Edgar Tekere (1937–2011), former Secretary-General ZANU-PF and leader of Zimbabwe Unity Movement
- Rejoice Timire (1959–2021), senator and activist
- Garfield Todd (1908–2002), former Prime Minister of Southern Rhodesia, leader of United Rhodesia Party, United Federal Party and Central Africa Party, opponent of white minority rule, former member of the Senate of Zimbabwe
- Judith Todd (born 1943), Rhodesian activist
- Langton Towungana (born ?), independent politician
- Morgan Tsvangirai (1952–2018), former prime minister of the Republic of Zimbabwe, leader of the MDC-T party
- Josiah Tungamirai (1948–2005) former Minister of State for Indigenization and Empowerment, MP, and Air Chief Marshal

== U ==
- Herbert Ushewokunze (born ?) one of the founders of ZANU, 1st minister of health, and minister of home affairs

== W ==
- Denis Walker (born 1933), Rhodesian cabinet minister and MP in both Rhodesia and Zimbabwe
- Maureen Thelma Watson (1925–1994), Rhodesian activist and MP
- Nicola Watson (born 1955), MDC MP
- Roy Welensky (1907–1991), second Prime Minister of the Federation of Rhodesia and Nyasaland and United Federal Party leader
- Edgar Whitehead (1905–1971), sixth Prime Minister of Southern Rhodesia and United Federal Party leader
- John Wrathall (1913–1978), minister, senator, MP, and president of Rhodesia

== Z ==
- Beauty Zhuwao (born 1965), ZANU–PF politician
- Patrick Zhuwao (born 1967), former ZANU–PF MP and deputy minister
- Ziyambi Ziyambi (born ?), ZANU–PF MP and deputy minister
- Sesel Zvidzai (born ?), MDC–T MP and deputy minister
- Murisi Zwizwai (born ?), MDC MP and deputy minister

== See also ==
- List of heads of state of Zimbabwe
