= List of members of the 5th Parliament of Zimbabwe =

The 5th Parliament of Zimbabwe met between 2000 and 2005. At the time, the Zimbabwean Parliament was unicameral, (Note: The Zimbabwean Senate, abolished in 1989, was reintroduced in 2005.) consisting of the 150-member House of Assembly, 120 of whom were elected via first-past-the-post voting in single-member constituencies. Of the remaining 30 seats, 12 members were appointed directly by the President, eight were provincial governors who were ex officio members, and ten seats were reserved for chiefs. In the June 2000 parliamentary election, the ruling Zimbabwe African National Union – Patriotic Front (ZANU–PF) won a 62-seat majority of the 120 elected seats, while the newly-formed Movement for Democratic Change (MDC) gained 57 seats, and the Zimbabwe African National Union – Ndonga took one seat.

The members of the 5th Parliament of Zimbabwe were sworn in on 18 July 2000, nearly a month after the election. ZANU–PF's Emmerson Mnangagwa, one of the presidential appointees, was elected Speaker. Edna Madzongwe, also of ZANU–PF, was elected Deputy Speaker. A number of by-elections occurred between 2000 and 2005, raising ZANU–PF's total number of elected seats from 62 to 68.

== Composition ==
| | Party | | | Total | Vacant |
| | ZANU–PF | MDC | ZANU–Ndonga | Total | Vacant |
|---|---|---|---|---|---|
| End of previous Parliament | 118 | – | 2 | 120 | 0 |
| Start | 62 | 57 | 1 | 120 | 0 |
| August 2000 | 61 | 57 | 1 | 119 | 1 |
| 26 November 2000 | 62 | 57 | 1 | 120 | 0 |
| December 2000 | 62 | 56 | 1 | 119 | 1 |
| 14 January 2001 | 63 | 56 | 1 | 120 | 0 |
| 28 April 2001 | 62 | 56 | 1 | 119 | 1 |
| 26 May 2001 | 61 | 56 | 1 | 118 | 2 |
| 4 June 2001 | 60 | 56 | 1 | 117 | 3 |
| 28 July 2001 | 61 | 56 | 1 | 118 | 2 |
| 9 September 2001 | 62 | 56 | 1 | 119 | 1 |
| 23 September 2001 | 63 | 56 | 1 | 120 | 0 |
| 11 August 2002 | 63 | 55 | 1 | 119 | 1 |
| 22 October 2002 | 63 | 54 | 1 | 118 | 2 |
| 27 October 2002 | 64 | 54 | 1 | 119 | 1 |
| 26 November 2002 | 64 | 53 | 1 | 118 | 2 |
| 27 February 2003 | 64 | 52 | 1 | 117 | 3 |
| 12 March 2003 | 64 | 51 | 1 | 116 | 4 |
| 17 March 2003 | 63 | 51 | 1 | 115 | 5 |
| 30 March 2003 | 63 | 53 | 1 | 117 | 3 |
| 9 August 2003 | 63 | 52 | 1 | 116 | 4 |
| 30 August 2003 | 64 | 53 | 1 | 118 | 2 |
| 20 September 2003 | 63 | 53 | 1 | 117 | 3 |
| 30 November 2003 | 64 | 53 | 1 | 118 | 2 |
| 2 February 2004 | 64 | 52 | 1 | 117 | 3 |
| 3 February 2004 | 65 | 52 | 1 | 118 | 2 |
| 28 March 2004 | 66 | 52 | 1 | 119 | 1 |
| 16 May 2004 | 67 | 52 | 1 | 120 | 0 |
| 24 July 2004 | 67 | 51 | 1 | 119 | 1 |
| 22 August 2004 | 66 | 51 | 1 | 118 | 2 |
| 5 September 2000 | 67 | 51 | 1 | 119 | 1 |
| 9 October 2004 | 68 | 51 | 1 | 120 | 0 |

== Elected members ==
| Name | Party | Constituency | Province | Notes |
|---|---|---|---|---|
| Welshman Ncube | MDC | Bulawayo North East | Bulawayo | |
| David Coltart | MDC | Bulawayo South | Bulawayo | |
| Fletcher Dulini | MDC | Lobengula | Bulawayo | |
| Thokozani Khuphe | MDC | Makokoba | Bulawayo | |
| Milton Gwetu | MDC | Mpopoma | Bulawayo | |
| Gibson Sibanda | MDC | Nkulumane | Bulawayo | |
| Jeffrey Khumalo | MDC | Pelandaba | Bulawayo | |
| Esaph Mdhlongwa | MDC | Pumula–Luveve | Bulawayo | |
| Gilbert Shoko | MDC | Budiriro | Harare | |
| Fidelis Mhashu | MDC | Chitungwiza | Harare | |
| Edwin Mushoriwa | MDC | Dzivarasekwa | Harare | |
| Priscilla Misihairambwi | MDC | Glen Norah | Harare | |
| Paul Madzore | MDC | Glen View | Harare | |
| Mike Auret | MDC | Harare Central | Harare | Resigned 27 February 2003. |
| Tendai Biti | MDC | Harare East | Harare | |
| Trudy Stevenson | MDC | Harare North | Harare | |
| Gabriel Chaibva | MDC | Harare South | Harare | |
| Tapiwa Mashakada | MDC | Hatfield | Harare | |
| Munyaradzi Gwisai | MDC | Highfield | Harare | Expelled 26 November 2002. |
| Willias Madzimure | MDC | Kambuzuma | Harare | |
| Learnmore Jongwe | MDC | Kuwadzana | Harare | Died on 22 October 2002. |
| Justin Mutendadzamera | MDC | Mabvuku | Harare | |
| Tichaona Munyanyi | MDC | Mbare East | Harare | |
| Dunmore Makuvaza | MDC | Mbare West | Harare | |
| Paurina Mpariwa | MDC | Mufakose | Harare | |
| Job Sikhala | MDC | St Mary's | Harare | |
| Tafadzwa Musekiwa | MDC | Zengeza | Harare | Resigned 12 March 2003. |
| Kenneth Manyonda | ZANU–PF | Buhera North | Manicaland | |
| Kumbirai Kangai | ZANU–PF | Buhera South | Manicaland | |
| Roy Bennett | MDC | Chimanimani | Manicaland | |
| Messias Matewu | MDC | Chipinge North | Manicaland | |
| Wilson Khumbula | ZANU–Ndonga | Chipinge South | Manicaland | |
| Shadreck Chipanga | ZANU–PF | Makoni East | Manicaland | |
| Didymus Mutasa | ZANU–PF | Makoni North | Manicaland | |
| Moven Mahachi | ZANU–PF | Makoni West | Manicaland | Died 26 May 2001. |
| Innocent Gonese | MDC | Mutare Central | Manicaland | |
| Giles Mutsekwa | MDC | Mutare North | Manicaland | |
| Sydney Mukwecheni | MDC | Mutare South | Manicaland | |
| Christopher Mushowe | ZANU–PF | Mutare West | Manicaland | |
| Evelyn Masaiti | MDC | Mutasa | Manicaland | |
| Leonard Chirewamangu | MDC | Nyanga | Manicaland | |
| Border Gezi | ZANU–PF | Bindura | Mashonaland Central | Died 28 April 2001. |
| Paul Mazikana | ZANU–PF | Guruve North | Mashonaland Central | |
| Edward Chindori-Chininga | ZANU–PF | Guruve South | Mashonaland Central | |
| Chenhamo Chimutingwende | ZANU–PF | Mazowe East | Mashonaland Central | |
| Christopher Kuruneri | ZANU–PF | Mazowe West | Mashonaland Central | |
| Joice Mujuru | ZANU–PF | Mount Darwin North | Mashonaland Central | |
| Saviour Kasukuwere | ZANU–PF | Mount Darwin South | Mashonaland Central | |
| Nobbie Dzinzi | ZANU–PF | Muzarabani | Mashonaland Central | |
| Lazarus Dokora | ZANU–PF | Rushinga | Mashonaland Central | |
| Nicholas Goche | ZANU–PF | Shamva | Mashonaland Central | |
| Chenjerai Hunzvi | ZANU–PF | Chikomba | Mashonaland East | Died 4 June 2001. |
| Herbert Murerwa | ZANU–PF | Goromonzi | Mashonaland East | |
| Aeneas Chigwedere | ZANU–PF | Hwedza | Mashonaland East | |
| Sydney Sekeramayi | ZANU–PF | Marondera East | Mashonaland East | |
| Rufaro Gwanzura | ZANU–PF | Marondera West | Mashonaland East | Died August 2000. |
| Ray Kaukonde | ZANU–PF | Mudzi | Mashonaland East | |
| Victor Chitongo | ZANU–PF | Murehwa North | Mashonaland East | |
| Joel Biggie Matiza | ZANU–PF | Murehwa South | Mashonaland East | |
| David Chapfika | ZANU–PF | Mutoko North | Mashonaland East | |
| Olivia Muchena | ZANU–PF | Mutoko South | Mashonaland East | |
| Bennie Tumbare-Mutasa | MDC | Seke | Mashonaland East | Died 24 July 2004. |
| Kenneth Mutiwekuziva | ZANU–PF | Uzumba–Maramba–Pfungwe | Mashonaland East | |
| Charles Ndlovu | ZANU–PF | Chegutu | Mashonaland West | |
| Phillip Chiyangwa | ZANU–PF | Chinhoyi | Mashonaland West | |
| Reuben Marumahoko | ZANU–PF | Hurungwe East | Mashonaland West | |
| Mark Madiro | ZANU–PF | Hurungwe West | Mashonaland West | Died May 2002. |
| Austin Mupandawana | MDC | Kadoma Central | Mashonaland West | Died 9 August 2003. |
| Paul Mangwana | ZANU–PF | Kadoma East | Mashonaland West | |
| Zachariah Ziyambi | ZANU–PF | Kadoma West | Mashonaland West | |
| Isaac Mackenzie | ZANU–PF | Kariba | Mashonaland West | |
| Swithun Mombeshora | ZANU–PF | Makonde | Mashonaland West | Died 17 March 2003. |
| Hilda Mafudze | MDC | Mhondoro | Mashonaland West | |
| Ignatius Chombo | ZANU–PF | Zvimba North | Mashonaland West | |
| Sabina Mugabe | ZANU–PF | Zvimba South | Mashonaland West | |
| Walter Mutsauri | ZANU–PF | Bikita East | Masvingo | |
| Amos Mutongi | MDC | Bikita West | Masvingo | Died December 2000. |
| Elliot Chauke | ZANU–PF | Chiredzi North | Masvingo | |
| Aaron Baloyi | ZANU–PF | Chiredzi South | Masvingo | |
| Samuel Mumbengegwi | ZANU–PF | Chivi North | Masvingo | |
| Charles Majange | ZANU–PF | Chivi South | Masvingo | |
| Simon Muzenda | ZANU–PF | Gutu North | Masvingo | Died 20 September 2003. |
| Shuvai Mahofa | ZANU–PF | Gutu South | Masvingo | |
| Silas Mangono | MDC | Masvingo Central | Masvingo | |
| Stan Mudenge | ZANU–PF | Masvingo North | Masvingo | |
| Eddison Zvobgo | ZANU–PF | Masvingo South | Masvingo | Died 22 August 2004. |
| Isaiah Shumba | ZANU–PF | Mwenezi | Masvingo | |
| Tinos Rusere | ZANU–PF | Zaka East | Masvingo | |
| Jefta Chindanya | ZANU–PF | Zaka West | Masvingo | |
| Joel Gabuza | MDC | Binga | Matabeleland North | |
| Jacob Mabikwa | MDC | Bubi–Mguza | Matabeleland North | |
| Cephas Nyoni | MDC | Hwange East | Matabeleland North | |
| Jealous Sansole | MDC | Hwange West | Matabeleland North | |
| David Mpala | MDC | Lupane | Matabeleland North | Died 2 February 2004. |
| Abednico Bhebhe | MDC | Nkayi | Matabeleland North | |
| Mtoliki Sibanda | MDC | Tsholotsho | Matabeleland North | |
| Kembo Mohadi | ZANU–PF | Beitbridge | Matabeleland South | |
| Moses Ndlovu | MDC | Bulilima–Mangwe North | Matabeleland South | |
| Edward Mkhosi | MDC | Bulilima–Mangwe South | Matabeleland South | |
| Paul Themba Nyathi | MDC | Gwanda North | Matabeleland South | |
| Abednico Ncube | ZANU–PF | Gwanda South | Matabeleland South | |
| George Joe Ndlovu | MDC | Insiza | Matabeleland South | Died 11 August 2002. |
| Lovemore Moyo | MDC | Matobo | Matabeleland South | |
| Nomalanga Khumalo | MDC | Umzingwane | Matabeleland South | |
| Innocent Chikiyi | ZANU–PF | Chirumanzu | Midlands | |
| Lovemore Mupukuta | ZANU–PF | Gokwe Central | Midlands | |
| Flora Bhuka | ZANU–PF | Gokwe East | Midlands | |
| Elick Mkandla | ZANU–PF | Gokwe North | Midlands | |
| Jaison Machaya | ZANU–PF | Gokwe South | Midlands | |
| Esther Nyauchi | ZANU–PF | Gokwe West | Midlands | |
| Renson Gasela | MDC | Gweru Rural | Midlands | |
| Timothy Mukahlera | MDC | Gweru Urban | Midlands | |
| Blessing Chebundo | MDC | Kwekwe | Midlands | |
| Rugare Gumbo | ZANU–PF | Mberengwa East | Midlands | |
| Jorum Gumbo | ZANU–PF | Mberengwa West | Midlands | |
| Bethel Makwembere | MDC | Mkoba | Midlands | |
| Francis Nhema | ZANU–PF | Shurugwi | Midlands | |
| Abednico Malinga | MDC | Silobela | Midlands | |
| Daniel Mackenzie Ncube | ZANU–PF | Zhombe | Midlands | |
| Pearson Mbalekwa | ZANU–PF | Zvishavane | Midlands | |

== Unelected members ==
| Name | Party | Type | Province | Notes |
|---|---|---|---|---|
| Patrick Chinamasa | ZANU–PF | Presidential appointee | – | |
| Joseph Made | ZANU–PF | Presidential appointee | – | |
| Edna Madzongwe | ZANU–PF | Presidential appointee | – | |
| Simba Makoni | ZANU–PF | Presidential appointee | – | |
| Jonathan Moyo | ZANU–PF | Presidential appointee | – | |
| July Moyo | ZANU–PF | Presidential appointee | – | |
| Nkosana Moyo | ZANU–PF | Presidential appointee | – | |
| Joseph Msika | ZANU–PF | Presidential appointee | – | |
| John Nkomo | ZANU–PF | Presidential appointee | – | |
| David Parirenyatwa | ZANU–PF | Presidential appointee | – | |
| Timothy Stamps | ZANU–PF | Presidential appointee | – | |
| Josiah Tungamirai | ZANU–PF | Presidential appointee | – | |
| Vacant (Note: Kenneth Manyonda, resigned as governor of Manicaland after his election to Parliament for Buhera North.) | ZANU–PF | Provincial governor | Manicaland | |
| Vacant (Note: Border Gezi, resigned as governor of Mashonaland Central after his election to Parliament for Bindura.) | ZANU–PF | Provincial governor | Mashonaland Central | |
| David Karimanzira | ZANU–PF | Provincial governor | Mashonaland East | |
| Peter Chanetsa | ZANU–PF | Provincial governor | Mashonaland West | |
| Josiah Hungwe | ZANU–PF | Provincial governor | Masvingo | |
| Welshman Mabhena | ZANU–PF | Provincial governor | Matabeleland North | |
| Stephen Nkomo | ZANU–PF | Provincial governor | Matabeleland South | |
| Cephas Msipa | ZANU–PF | Provincial governor | Midlands | |
| Missing | ZANU–PF (Note: The chiefs, while not officially affiliated with any party, were in practice supportive of ZANU–PF.) | Chief | – | |
| Missing | ZANU–PF | Chief | – | |
| Missing | ZANU–PF | Chief | – | |
| Missing | ZANU–PF | Chief | – | |
| Missing | ZANU–PF | Chief | – | |
| Missing | ZANU–PF | Chief | – | |
| Missing | ZANU–PF | Chief | – | |
| Missing | ZANU–PF | Chief | – | |
| Missing | ZANU–PF | Chief | – | |
| Missing | ZANU–PF | Chief | – | |

== Membership changes ==
| Constituency | Vacated by | Party | Reason for change | Successor | Party | Elected/appointed |
|---|---|---|---|---|---|---|
| Marondera West | Rufaro Gwanzura | ZANU–PF | Died in August 2000. | Ambrose Mutinhiri | ZANU–PF | 26 November 2000 |
| Bikita West | Amos Mutongi | MDC | Died in December 2000. | Claudius Makova | ZANU–PF | 14 January 2001 |
| Bindura | Border Gezi | ZANU–PF | Died on 28 April 2001. | Elliot Manyika | ZANU–PF | 28 July 2001 |
| Makoni West | Moven Mahachi | ZANU–PF | Died on 26 May 2001. | Gibson Munyoro | ZANU–PF | 9 September 2001 |
| Chikomba | Chenjerai Hunzvi | ZANU–PF | Died on 4 June 2001. | Bernard Makokove | ZANU–PF | 23 September 2001 |
| Hurungwe West | Mark Madiro | ZANU–PF | Died in May 2002. | Phone Madiro | ZANU–PF | 29 September 2002 |
| Insiza | George Joe Ndlovu | MDC | Died on 11 August 2002. | Andrew Langa | ZANU–PF | 27 October 2002 |
| Kuwadzana | Learnmore Jongwe | MDC | Died on 22 October 2002. | Nelson Chamisa | MDC | 30 March 2003 |
| Highfield | Munyaradzi Gwisai | MDC | Expelled from the MDC on 26 November 2002. | Pearson Mungofa | MDC | 30 March 2003 |
| Harare Central | Mike Auret | MDC | Resigned on 27 February 2003. | Murisi Zwizwai | MDC | 30 August 2003 |
| Makonde | Swithun Mombeshora | ZANU–PF | Died on 17 March 2003. | Kindness Paradza | ZANU–PF | 30 August 2003 |
| Kadoma Central | Austin Mupandawana | MDC | Died on 9 August 2003. | Tichafa Mutema | ZANU–PF | 30 November 2003 |
| Gutu North | Simon Muzenda | ZANU–PF | Died on 20 September 2003. | Josiah Tungamirai | ZANU–PF | 3 February 2004 |
| Zengeza | Tafadzwa Musekiwa | MDC | Resigned on 12 March 2003. (Note: Musekiwa resigned while in the United Kingdom, where he sought political asylum in November 1981 after being targeted by state-sponsored violence.) | Christopher Chigumba | ZANU–PF | 28 March 2004 |
| Lupane | David Mpala | MDC | Died on 2 February 2004. | Martin Khumalo | ZANU–PF | 16 May 2004 |
| Seke | Bennie Tumbare-Mutasa | MDC | Died on 24 July 2004. | Phineas Chihota | ZANU–PF | 5 September 2004 |
| Masvingo South | Eddison Zvobgo | ZANU–PF | Died on 22 August 2004. | Walter Mzembi | ZANU–PF | 9 October 2004 |
| Presidential appointee | Missing | ZANU–PF | | Amos Midzi | ZANU–PF | Missing |
| Presidential appointee | Missing | ZANU–PF | | Jacob Mudenda | ZANU–PF | Missing |
| Presidential appointee | Missing | ZANU–PF | | Sithembiso Nyoni | ZANU–PF | Missing |
