= Arlington, Harare =

Suburb in Harare, Zimbabwe

Coordinates: 17°54′17″S 31°04′47″E

Arlington is a residential suburb east of Harare, adjacent to Harare International Airport, that began to be developed in the 1990s. While the area is predominantly residential, it has recently witnessed plenty of development, with several luxury developments, due to its proximity to the airport.

== History ==
Arlington was originally owned by former mayor of Salisbury, Mayor William Harvey Brown, after his farm, Arlington, which he likely named after Arlington, Virginia. He was a naturalist from Iowa and joined the occupational forces to collect specimens for the Smithsonian Institution in Washington, D.C.

Arlington was established as a residential area in the 1990s and incorporated in the City of Harare Municipality in 2000. It forms part of the Eastern suburbs of Harare, southeast of Hatfield, east of Waterfalls and north of Harare International Airport.

The suburb is relatively modern, having experienced significant growth in the last decade. Many residents and investors have relocated there due to its proximity to good highway links and its proximity to Harare International Airport, as well as the districts, relative secluded location, which gives the area a sense of privacy and tranquility. Arlington's development has meant there is little break between the outskirts of Harare and the airport itself, replacing what was predominantly a farm belt surrounding the city.

== Amenities ==
Falcon Golf Club is the suburbs most prominent green space, which offers discounted membership rates to local residents. It provides space for a number of community and recreational activities.

Arlington Estate, is a newer, wealthier subdivision of Arlington that feature larger homes and additional space for public recreation with its own system of swimming pools and tennis courts for its own residents, far removed from much of Harare. Homes feature a mix of contemporary, Cape Dutch and modern architectureal styles.

Arlington has few amenities itself, with most residents choosing to drive to Hatfield and the northern and eastern suburbs for shopping and entertainment.

== Climate ==
Köppen-Geiger climate classification system classifies its climate as subtropical highland (Cwb).

Climate data for Arlington, Harare Province
Month	Jan	Feb	Mar	Apr	May	Jun	Jul	Aug	Sep	Oct	Nov	Dec	Year
Mean daily maximum °C (°F)	26.4 (79.5)	26.1 (79.0)	25.1 (77.2)	22.8 (73.0)	20.7 (69.3)	17.9 (64.2)	18.1 (64.6)	21 (70)	23.9 (75.0)	25 (77)	25.4 (77.7)	26.1 (79.0)	23.2 (73.8)
Daily mean °C (°F)	20.5 (68.9)	20.2 (68.4)	19 (66)	16.1 (61.0)	13.2 (55.8)	10.2 (50.4)	10.3 (50.5)	13 (55)	16.2 (61.2)	18.1 (64.6)	19.1 (66.4)	20 (68)	16.3 (61.4)
Mean daily minimum °C (°F)	14.6 (58.3)	14.3 (57.7)	12.9 (55.2)	9.5 (49.1)	5.7 (42.3)	2.5 (36.5)	2.6 (36.7)	5 (41)	8.6 (47.5)	11.3 (52.3)	12.9 (55.2)	14 (57)	9.5 (49.1)
Average precipitation mm (inches)	140 (5.5)	91 (3.6)	83 (3.3)	55 (2.2)	15 (0.6)	8 (0.3)	6 (0.2)	7 (0.3)	23 (0.9)	74 (2.9)	111 (4.4)	110 (4.3)	723 (28.5)
Source: Climate-Data.org (altitude: 1507m)

== Transportation ==
Arlington is the home of Harare International Airport and links to much of Harare via Seke and Airport Roads.
