= Herbert Gomba =

Zimbabwean politician, former mayor of Harare

Mayor of Harare
- In office 3 September 2018 – 14 August 2020
- Deputy: Enock Mupamawonde
- Preceded by: Bernard Manyenyeni
- Succeeded by: Jacob Mafume

Deputy Mayor of Harare
- In office 2008–2013
- Mayor: Muchadeyi Masunda
- Succeeded by: Thomas Muzuva

Member of the Harare City Council from Ward 27
- Incumbent
- Assumed office 2008

Personal details
- Born: c. 1977 (age 48–49) Rusape, Rhodesia
- Party: MDC Alliance (2018–2020); CCC (2022–present)
- Education: University of Zimbabwe (BS); Africa University (MS)

Herbert Thomas Gomba (born c. 1977) is a Zimbabwean politician who served as mayor of Harare from 2018 to 2020. He has been a member of the Harare City Council since 2008 representing Ward 27, which covers parts of the Glen Norah suburb. Gomba was elected and sworn in as mayor on 3 September 2018, but was recalled from the City Council on 14 August 2020 amid factional disputes within the Movement for Democratic Change Alliance. He was reelected to the City Council in a March 2022 by-election as a Citizens Coalition for Change candidate.

== Early life and education ==
Gomba was born in the town of Rusape in Manicaland Province. He attended Highfield 2 High School in Harare, where he completed his Ordinary and Advanced Levels. After leaving school, he worked in various positions at Meikles Hotel before his election as councillor.

In 2013, he earned a Bachelor of Science degree with honours in sociology from the University of Zimbabwe. He received a Master of Science in public policy and governance from Africa University near Mutare in 2016.

== Political career ==
Gomba was elected to the Harare City Council in 2008 for Ward 27, which covers parts of the Glen Norah suburb. He has served as chairman of the business committee and health and environment committee, and was also a member of the housing committee and finance and development committee. He became deputy mayor of Harare in 2008, but lost the post to Thomas Muzuwa in 2013. Gomba was reelected to the City Council for Ward 27 in the 2018 election with 7,676 votes against ZANU–PF candidate Jephson Matewe's 1,918 votes.

On 2 September 2018, The Standard reported that Gomba had been chosen as the mayoral candidate of the Movement for Democratic Change Alliance. Gomba had been on the shortlist of three names presented by MDC Alliance President Nelson Chamisa before the party's national council earlier that week. The other two names on the shortlist were Deputy Mayor Enock Mupamawonde and Councillor Ian Makone, the former chief advisor to Prime Minister Morgan Tsvangirai. Factionalism reportedly played a role in the decision—Makone had the endorsement of MDC–T Secretary-General Douglas Mwonzora, whereas Gomba was seen as a Chamisa ally. An additional factor was that Gomba came from the high-density suburbs, while Makone represented a ward composed of Borrowdale and other affluent low-density suburbs.

Gomba was elected mayor of Harare on 3 September 2018 at a meeting of the city council. The only ZANU–PF councillor, Martin Matinyanya, nominated himself for the position, but did not receive a second, and Gomba was then elected unanimously. The incumbent deputy mayor, Enock Mupamawonde, retained his post. Gomba was sworn in on the same day by acting town clerk Hosea Chisango. In his acceptance speech, Gomba said he intended to be a servant and listening mayor, and listed some of the problems facing the city, including corruption, water shortages, road infrastructure, traffic and street vending congestion, debt, and illegal occupation of council land. Gomba is the first mayor from the city's western suburbs. He succeeded Bernard Manyenyeni, who did not run for reelection to the city council in 2018.

On 14 August 2020, Gomba was recalled from the City Council amid factional disputes within the MDC Alliance. In a letter addressed to Minister of Local Government July Moyo, MDC–T secretary Douglas Mwonzora wrote that Gomba and five other city councillors "have ceased to be belong to the Movement for Democratic Change which is a member of the Movement for Democratic Change Alliance which was formed... for purposes of contesting the 2018 elections." The MDC–T, then led by Thokozani Khuphe after the Supreme Court ruled against Nelson Chamisa's claim to party leadership, had been recalling parliamentarians and councillors across the country. Mwonzora said Gomba and the other councillors had been recalled as a result of their insubordination to party leadership. Gomba and six other former councillors challenged their recalls, but their petition was dismissed by the High Court in November 2021.

On 26 March 2022, Gomba was reelected to the City Council for his previous Ward 27 seat, this time as a member of the Citizens Coalition for Change, a new opposition party led by Nelson Chamisa. Prior to the election, on 14 March, Gomba was arrested on charges of violating Section 37 of the Electoral Act, for allegedly registering as a voter at a Glen Norah home owned by his parents, where he did not live. The complainant in the case was Jephson Matewe, the ZANU–PF candidate for the by-election in Ward 27, who had lost to Gomba in City Council elections three times in a row. The following month, on 27 April, the National Prosecuting Authority announced that it was still investigating the matter and was granted a postponement to 30 May while investigations were ongoing. In addition to allegedly submitting a false address himself, Gomba was also accused of falsely declaring the registration of 22 other voters at the same Glen Norah address. On 3 November 2022, prosecutor Lancelot Mutsokoti told the Magistrates Court that investigations were now complete, and that Gomba would be given a trial date at the next hearing on 21 November.
