= Glen View South =

Constituency of the Parliament of Zimbabwe

- National Assembly constituency for the Parliament of Zimbabwe
- District: Harare
- Province: Harare
- Electorate: 31,153 (2023)

Current constituency
- Created: 2008
- Number of members: 1
- Party: ZANU-PF
- Member: Tranquility Tsitsi Tawomhera
- Created from: Glen View

Glen View South is a constituency represented in the National Assembly of the Parliament of Zimbabwe, comprising the southern portion of the Glen View suburb of Harare. It was created in 2008 from the old Glen View constituency, along with Glen View North.

Its MP since a 7 September 2019 by-election was Vincent Tsvangirai of the MDC Alliance, son of the late opposition leader Morgan Tsvangirai. He replaced his sister, Vimbai Tsvangirai-Java, who died on 10 June 2019. The latest MP since the 2023 election was Grandmore Hakata of the Citizens Coalition for Change who died on the 23rd of January 2025.

== Members ==
Election	Name	Party
2008	Paul Madzore	MDC–T
2013	Paul Madzore	MDC–T
2018	Vimbai Tsvangirai-Java	MDC Alliance
2019 by-election	Vincent Tsvangirai	MDC Alliance
2023	Grandmore Hakata	CCC
2025 by-election	Tranquility Tsitsi Tawomhera	ZANU-PF

== See also ==
- List of Zimbabwean parliamentary constituencies
