= Goromonzi High School =

Secondary school in Zimbabwe

Goromonzi High School is a secondary school located in Goromonzi, Mashonaland East Province, Zimbabwe.

== History ==
Goromonzi school is located 35 kilometers from the Zimbabwean capital Harare, along the Harare-Mutare Road. The school was established in 1946 as the first boarding school for black high school students - expanding the role of education in what was then Southern Rhodesia, and designed to provide access to university education. Started initially as a boys school, the first girls were admitted under the headmastership of John Hammond in 1954. Until that time, there had been suspicion amongst the people about education for women. The first intake was of only five girls but by 1959 the first Head Girl, Sarah Chavunduka, was admitted to the University of Rhodesia. The success of the school was such that after Zimbabwe's independence in 1980, the first African headmaster was a former pupil and head boy of the school, Aeneas Chigwedere. Other notable students are Liberty Mhlanga who won a scholarship to study at Clark University in Massachusetts; Hosea Mapondera who won a Ford Foundation Grant and was then on the staff of the National Gallery; Edmund Grace and Cornelius Sanyanga excelled in their careers. Another pupil studying at the University of Rhodesia was Buzwani Mothobi, who wrote a report back to the school on the first intake of African students in 1960, saying "The Goromonzi colony now numbers about 20 souls out of a total black population of about 49."

== Academics ==
Subjects offered include Mathematics, English Language & Literature, Sciences, Accounts, practical subjects such as Agriculture, Woodwork, Fashion and Fabrics, Home Economics, Shona, Technical Graphics, Computer Studies, Biology, Physics, and Chemistry.

== Extracurricular activities ==
The school has facilities for a range of sports, including Rugby, Soccer, Netball, Volleyball, Basketball, Tennis, Table Tennis, Cricket, Athletics, swimming and other activities.

Social clubs include: An Entertainment Committee, Interact Club, Scripture Union, Toastmasters Club & Leo Club

=== Chess ===
Goromonzi High won the Harare Schools Chess league in 2014 under the leadership of Anesu Gwezere who was also the first to play for the school in Europe. Fellow team members were Kudzaishe Manyanya, Panashe Munemo and Panashe Gatsi. Kudzaishe Manyanya's fide rating of 1800 was the best in the country for his age group.

=== Basketball ===
Basketball is the school's main sport and produced Marshall Gwezere and Tinotenda Nyanhete who went on to represent the national basketball team. The school has consistently ranked among the best teams in Mashonaland East. In 2010 the under 20 boys basketball team made it to the nationals but lost to Churchill High School.

== See also ==
- List of boarding schools
- List of secondary schools in Mashonaland East

== Notable alumni ==
- Tendai Biti, Zimbabwean minister of finance
- Aeneas Chigwedere, educator, historian, and politician
- Tizirai Gwata, physician and politician; first black mayor of Harare
- Sarah Kachingwe, activist and politician
- Christopher Kuruneri, businessman, lawyer, and politician
- Simon Mazorodze, physician and politician
- David Phiri, businessman
