= Share Your Soles =

Non-profit organization in Chicago

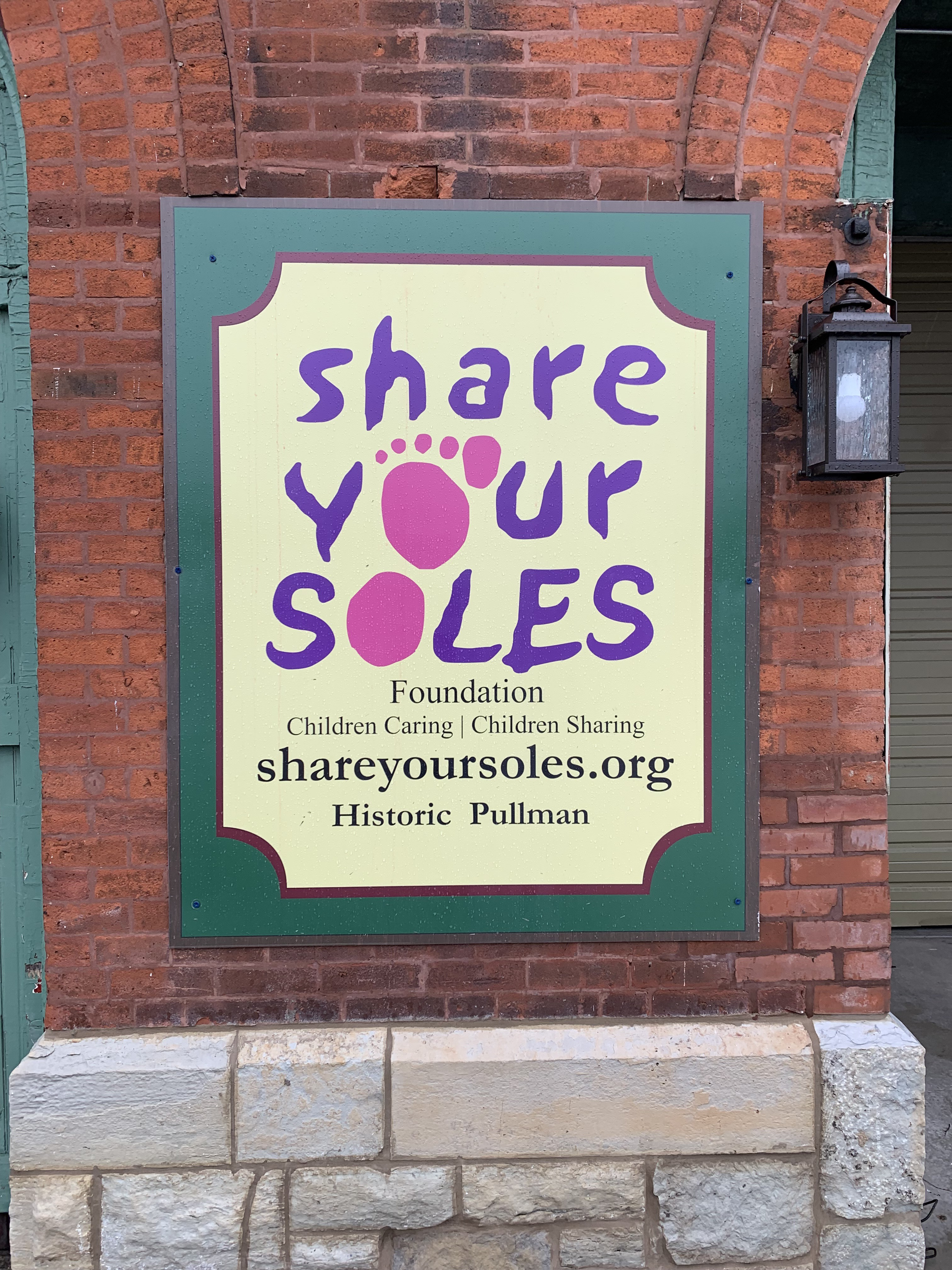
- Founder: Mona Purdy
- Established: 1999
- Mission: To provide gently worn shoes to those in need.
- Location: Chicago, IL, United States of America
- Website: http://shareyoursoles.org/

Share Your Soles is a non-profit organization in Chicago, Illinois, that provides shoes for the homeless and individuals that cannot afford to purchase shoes. The organization supplies shoes to individuals in the United States, as well as third world countries such as Uganda, Mexico, Peru and Guatemala. Share Your Soles sets up various fundraisers and develops partnerships in order to gain funds for their organization.

== History ==
Share Your Soles was established in 1999 after its founder, Mona Purdy, visited Guatemala to run a half marathon. Ms. Purdy noticed several individuals, especially children, placing hot tar under their feet as soles. An orthopedic surgeon informed Ms. Purdy that people without shoes were at higher risk of contracting parasites or disease from contaminated soil, and he often had to amputate limbs due to these issues. This motivated Ms. Purdy to partner with churches, schools, scout troops, civic organizations, and individuals to help collect and deliver shoes to those in need.

The first batch of shoes was collected by Ms. Purdy within her neighborhood in Palos Park, Illinois. Ms. Purdy set a collection goal of 1,000 pairs of shoes, which she partially collected in front of her home. Venture by airlines and embassies assisted Mona Purdy and shipped the collected shoes to Guatemala free of charge. Drop boxes are now located across the Chicago metropolitan area.

Over the years Share Your Soles and Ms. Purdy have been honored by the American Red Cross, Chicagoan of the Year and the Chicago City Council as well as by many organizations across the south and southwest suburbs, where she got her start. The organization opened their first facility in 2003 and in 2011 moved to Chicago's Pullman community. The Pullman Distribution Warehouse was eventually moved to its permanent home, The Historic Pullman Stables on S Cottage Grove Ave.

As of 2014 the organization has delivered more than 2 million shoes to men, women, and children in impoverished areas around the world.

== Mission statement ==
Share Your Soles looks to donate gently worn and new shoes to those in need. In order for the organization to have success within their mission statement they have developed long standing programs and also receive help from corporate sponsors that aid them in reaching their yearly goals. Working with volunteers and contributors has allowed them to transport the shoes to over 47 countries.

== Programs ==
Ms. Purdy developed programs so that volunteers and workers can earn a pair of shoes. Once an individual fulfilled all requirements for a certain order, they would receive a voucher to get their earned pair of shoes.

=== Will Learn to Earn ===
The "Will Learn to Earn" program was designed for children and young adults in school with a low socioeconomic status. Children and young adults would write an essay on how a pair of soles would benefit them and would receive a pair of shoes in return. This program enabled children to get a pair of track shoes or winter boots.

=== Will Work to Earn ===
The "Will Work to Earn" program allows adults to earn a pair of shoes by volunteering their time at the warehouse. Individuals also had the option to help out their community in order to receive a pair of shoes. Adults in the program were able to pick out shoes they need for their everyday life.

== Contributions ==
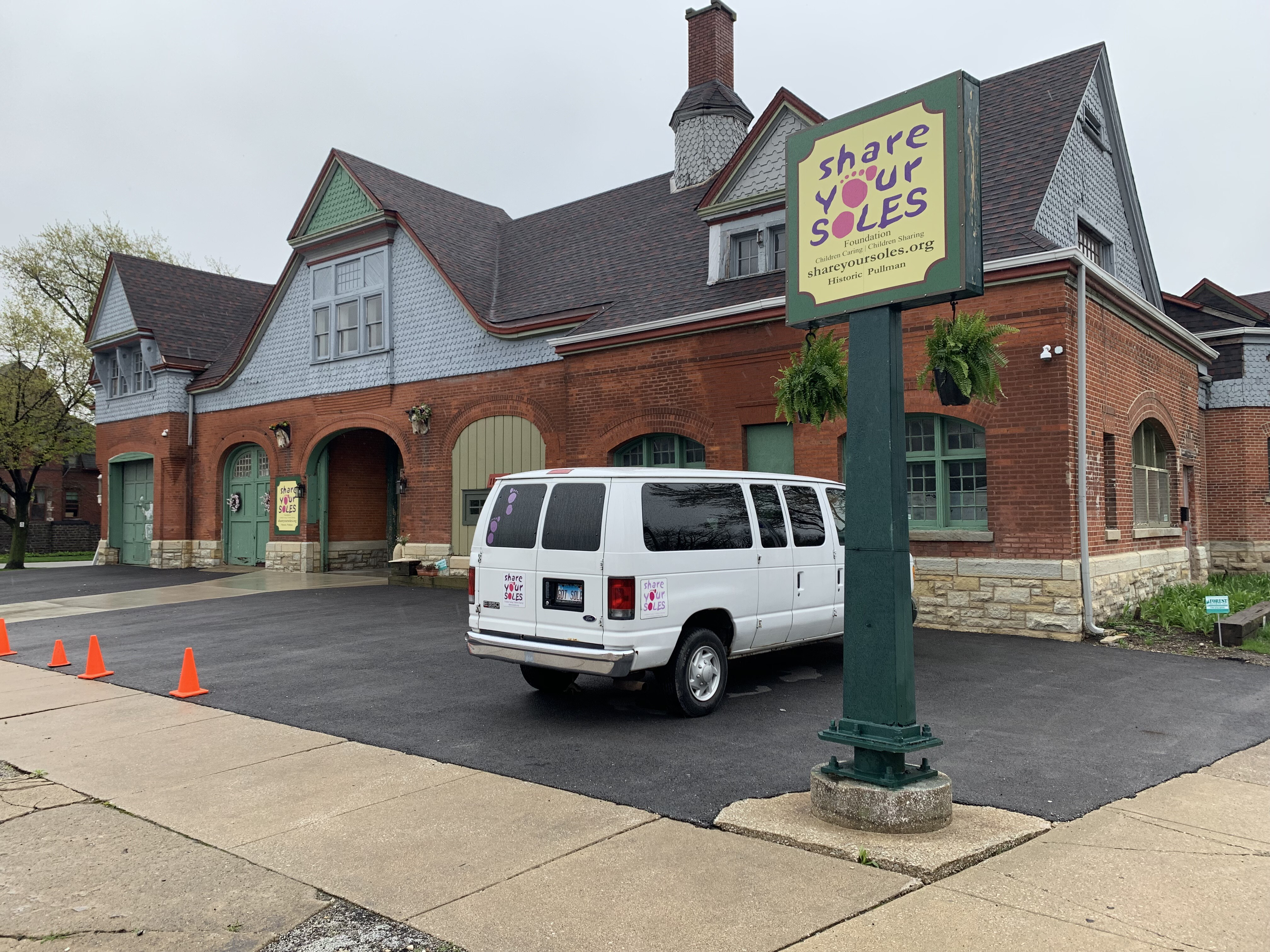
Street location of Share Your Soles.

Share Your Soles works with 20 to 50 volunteers each week. Volunteers can raise funding or collect and sort through shoes, which will be packed accordingly to their destination. Fundraising efforts have included marathons and musical events and Annual Galas.

In 2014 Share Your Soles donated shoes to students at Eisenhower Elementary in Flint, Michigan, where children were able to receive footwear by contributing three hours of kindness by performing activities such as basic chores. Eisenhower Elementary is considered a Pathways school and volunteers work with these schools to identify and remove barriers to the children attending the school. The organization donated over 300 pairs of shoes and has continued to annually donate to Flint.

The Illinois Bone and Joint Institute (IBJI) partnered with Share Your Soles in 2010 and hosted a shoes drive for Haiti. This drive was intended to help individuals in Haiti after an earthquake on January 12, 2010. The earthquake caused significant damage with 230,000 deaths and 1 million individuals forced to live in tents. 5004 pairs of shoes were collected and shipped out to the country. Share Your Soles has also hosted fundraising events such as the 2016 Help for Haiti, where the profits were directed to the citizens of Haiti after their encounter with Hurricane Matthew.

In 2019 the organization hosted a fundraiser celebrating their 20th anniversary, where proceeds were used to aid children in attending school by providing them shoes. Share Your Shoes donated approximately 5,000 pairs of shoes to the people of Zimbabwe when the Mayor of Zimbabwe, Muchadeyi Masunda visited Chicago.

Ms. Purdy has collected over three million pairs of shoes to impoverished areas over the last 20 years. These countries include Central America, Southeast Asia, the Caribbean, Eastern Europe, and the United States.

== Awards and recognition ==
Share Your Soles donated 15,000 pairs of shoes to the civilians of Sri Lanka after a tsunami hit their land in 2004. On June 11, 2009, Purdy received her first Award Service to Mankind by the Foundation for Civilian Bravery for the donation of 15,000 pairs to Sri Lanka. In 2017, the University of St. Francis grants the Sister Clare Award to Mona Purdy in honor of Women's History Month. According to the University of St. Francis, this award is given to women who “transformed the world of their time”.
