= Timeline of Harare =

The following is a timeline of the history of the city of Harare, Zimbabwe.

== Prior to 20th century ==
- 1890 – Fort Salisbury founded in Mashonaland by British South Africa Company.
- 1891 – Mashonaland Herald and Zambesian Times newspaper begins publication.
- 1896 – Salisbury Polo Club formed.
- 1897
  - Harare Township built.
  - Salisbury attains municipal status.
- 1899 – Beira-Salisbury railway begins operating.

== 20th century ==
- 1902
  - Botswana-Salisbury railway begins operating.
  - Queen Victoria Memorial Library founded.
- 1915 – Meikles Hotel in business.
- 1923 – Town becomes capital of Southern Rhodesia, a self-governing British colony.
- 1927 – Salisbury Technical School established.
- 1933 – Town House built.
- 1936 – Library of the National Archives founded.
- 1939 – Honorary Consulate of Poland opened.
- 1945 – Railway strike.
- 1946
  - Reformed Industrial and Commercial Workers Union established.
  - Population: 54,090.
- 1948
  - General strike.
  - Zimbabwe College of Music established.
- 1950 – Gwebe College of Agriculture established.
- 1951
  - Stock exchange established.
  - Population: 90,024.
- 1953
  - City becomes capital of the Federation of Rhodesia and Nyasaland.
  - Helping Hand Club (women's group) formed.
- 1955 – University College of Rhodesia and Nyasaland and Salisbury City Youth League established.
- 1956
  - Salisbury Airport commissioned.
  - Bus boycott.
- 1957 – Rhodes National Gallery opens.
- 1959 – Pearl Assurance House built.
- 1960 – Central Film Laboratories in business.
- 1962
  - First International Congress of African Culture held in city.
  - Queen Victoria Memorial Library rebuilt.
- 1964 – Greenwood Park established.
- 1969 – The Financial Gazette begins publication.

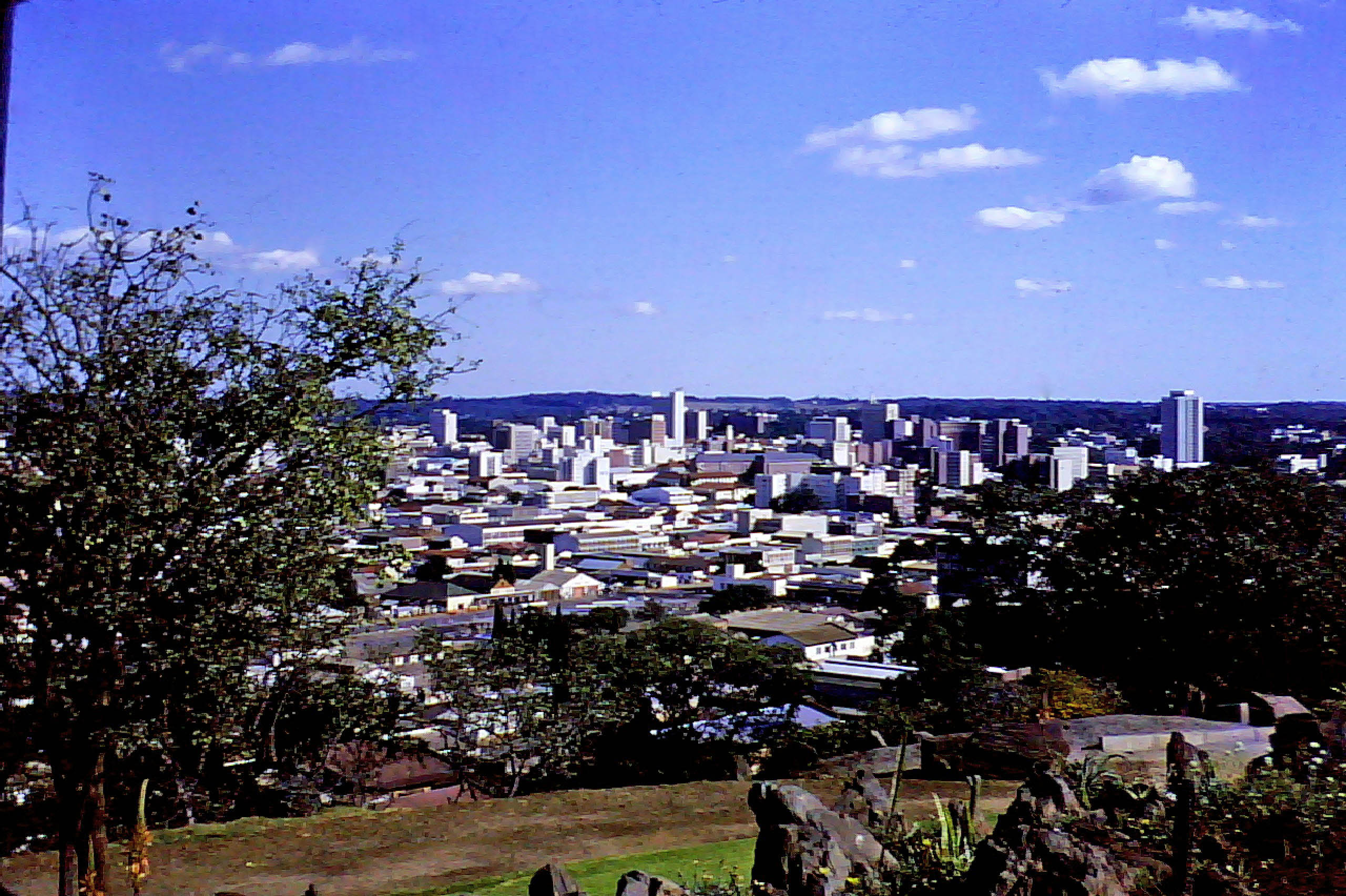
View of the city in the 1970s

- 1970 – Chapungu Sculpture Park founded.
- 1972
  - Zimbabwe National Library and Documentation Service headquartered in city.
  - Construction of New Mabvuku begins.
- 1973 - Population: 502,000 urban agglomeration.
- 1975 – Mabvuku High School opens in Mabvuku.
- 1977 – 6 August: Bombing.
- 1978 – Oil storage tanks set on fire by the Zimbabwe African National Liberation Army.

=== 1980s–1990s ===
- 1980 18 April: City becomes part of independent Republic of Zimbabwe.
- 1981
  - December: Bombing of ZANU-PF headquarters.
  - National Heroes' Acre monument built near city.
- 1982 18 April: City renamed "Harare."
- 1984 – Harare Publishing House established.
- 1985 – Karigamombe Centre built.
- 1986 – September: City hosts Summit for the Non-Aligned Movement.

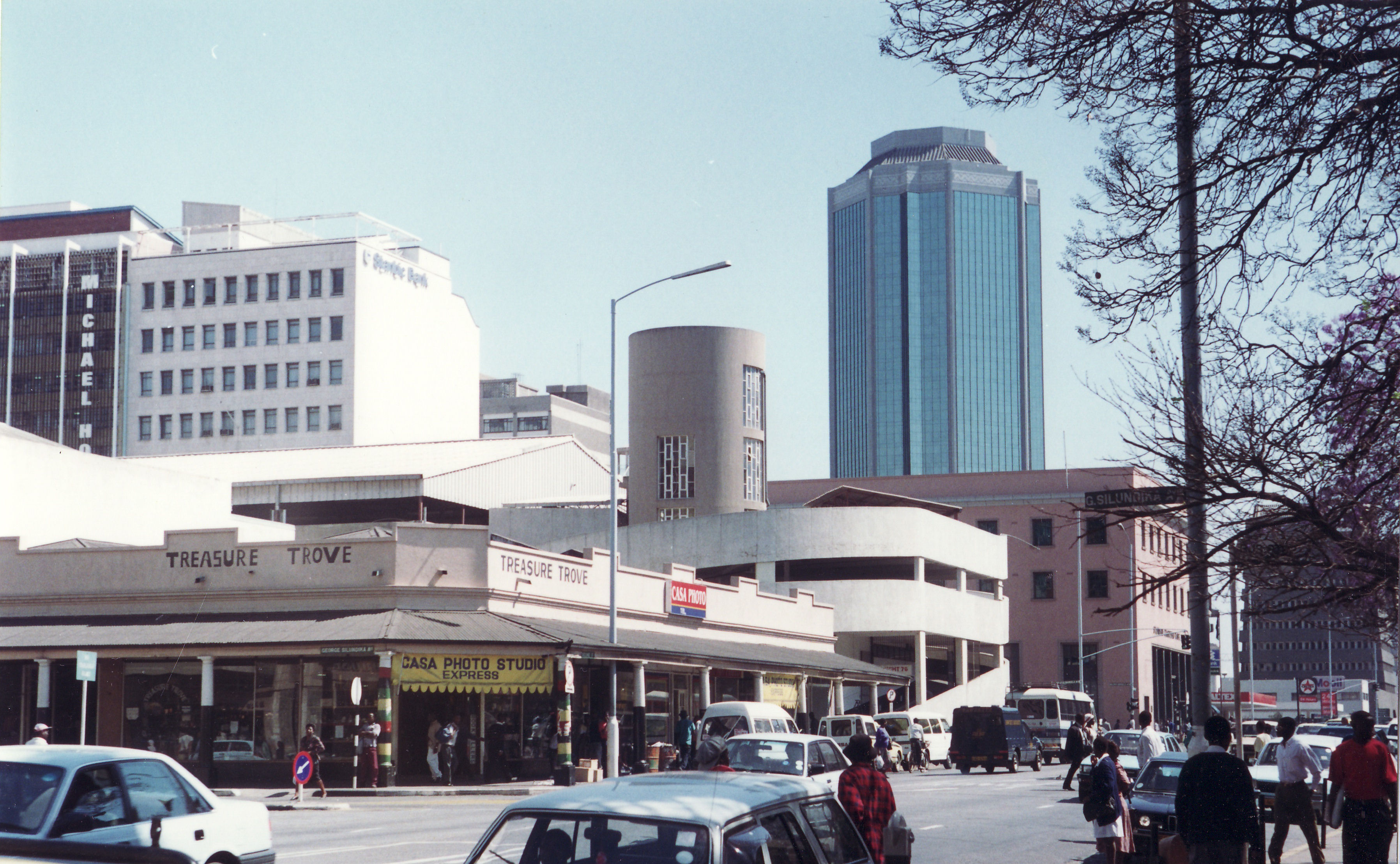
Harare in the 1990s

- 1990
  - Sister city relationship established with Cincinnati, US.
  - ZANU–PF Building is completed
- 1991 – October: City hosts Commonwealth Heads of Government Meeting 1991; Harare Declaration issued.
- 1992 - Population: 1,189,103.
- 1995 – September: City hosts 1995 All-Africa Games.
- 1996
  - Rainbow City Cinema in business.
  - Eastgate built.
  - Women Filmmakers of Zimbabwe headquartered in city.
- 1997 – New Reserve Bank tower built.
- 1998
  - Weaver Press publishing house established
  - Economic protest.
  - Zimbabwe International Film Festival begins.
  - December: City hosts meeting of World Council of Churches.
- 1999
  - Daily News begins publication.
  - Zimbabwe Catholic University established.
  - Harare International Festival of the Arts begins.
  - Media Monitoring Project headquartered in city.
- 2000 – Millennium Towers built.

== 21st century ==
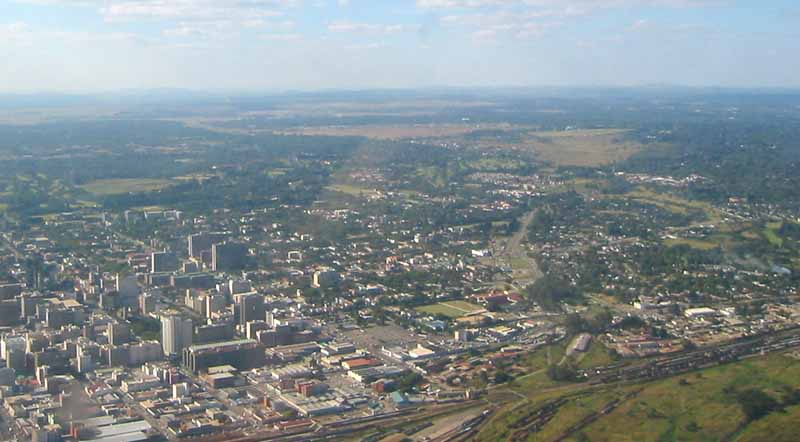
Aerial view of Harare, circa 2005

=== 2000s ===
- 2001 – Harare Tribune newspaper begins publication.
- 2002 – Elias Mudzuri becomes mayor.
- 2003
  - Water shortage.
  - Sekesai Makwavarara becomes acting mayor.
- 2004 – Harare International Airport terminal built (approximate date).
- 2005 – Operation Murambatsvina.
- 2008
  - Emmanuel Chiroto elected mayor, succeeded by Muchadeyi Masunda.
  - Harare Residents Trust organised.
  - Cholera outbreak.
- 2009
  - First Floor Gallery Harare in business.
  - Population: 1,513,173.

=== 2010s ===
- 2010
  - NewsDay begins publication.
  - Zimbabwe Fashion Week begins.
  - Joina City tower built.
- 2012 - Population: 1,485,231.
- 2013 - Bernard Gabriel Manyenyeni becomes mayor.
- 2017 - The military of Zimbabwe seize power and place the president under house arrest.

== See also ==
- Harare history
- List of mayors of Harare
- Timeline of Bulawayo

== Bibliography ==
=== Published in 20th century ===
- Neil Dewar (1991). "Harare". In Anthony Lemon (ed.). Homes Apart: South Africa's Segregated Cities. Indiana University Press. ISBN 0-253-33321-0.
- Terri Barnes; Everjoice Win (1992), To live a better life: an oral history of women in the city of Harare, 1930–70, Harare, Zimbabwe: Baobab Books, ISBN 0908311354
- Carole Rakodi (1995), Harare: Inheriting a Settler-Colonial City; Change or Continuity?, John Wiley & Sons, ISBN 9780471949510
- Nelson T. Samburenia (1996). "Emergence of independent African trade unions in Salisbury, Southern Rhodesia, 1920s to 1950s: Toward mass nationalism?". Kleio. 28.
- Timothy Scarnecchia (1996). "Poor Women and Nationalist Politics: Alliances and Fissures in the Formation of a Nationalist Political Movement in Salisbury, Rhodesia, 1950-6". Journal of African History. 37 (2): 283–310. doi:10.1017/S0021853700035234. JSTOR 183187. S2CID 162454994.
- Kinuthia Macharia (1997). Social and political dynamics of the informal economy in African cities: Nairobi and Harare. University Press of America. ISBN 978-0-7618-0840-4.
- Teresa A. Barnes (1999), 'We Women Worked so Hard': Gender, Urbanization and Social Reproduction in Colonial Harare, Zimbabwe, 1930–1956, Heinemann, ISBN 9780325001739
- Patrick Bond (1999). "Capital in the city: a history of urban financialflows through colonial Harare". In Brian Raftopoulos and Tsuneo Yoshikuni (ed.). Sites of Struggle. Weaver Press Ltd. ISBN 0797419845.

=== Published in 21st century ===
- Governing the Poor in Harare, Zimbabwe, Sweden: Nordic Africa Institute, 2002 – via International Relations and Security Network
- Oyekan Owomoyela (2002). "Introduction: Cities: Harare". Culture and Customs of Zimbabwe. Greenwood. p. 7+. ISBN 978-0-313-31583-1.
- Stanley D. Brunn; et al., eds. (2003), "Harare", Cities of the World (3rd ed.), Rowman & Littlefield, ISBN 084769898X
- Alois Mlambo (2003). "Harare". In Dickson Eyoh and Paul Tiyambe Zeleza (ed.). Encyclopedia of Twentieth-Century African History. Routledge. ISBN 0415234794.
- Luc J. A. Mougeot, ed. (2005). "(Harare)". Agropolis: The Social, Political, and Environmental Dimensions of Urban Agriculture. International Development Research Centre. ISBN 978-1-55250-186-3.
- Kevin Shillington, ed. (2005). "Harare". Encyclopedia of African History. Fitzroy Dearborn. ISBN 978-1-57958-245-6.
- Amin Y. Kamete (2006). "The Return of the Jettisoned: ZANU-PF's Crack at 'Re-Urbanising' in Harare". Journal of Southern African Studies. 32 (2): 255–271. Bibcode:2006JSAfS..32..255K. doi:10.1080/03057070600656143. JSTOR 25065091. S2CID 153859378.
- Terence O. Ranger (2007). "City Versus State in Zimbabwe: Colonial Antecedents of the Current Crisis". Journal of Eastern African Studies. 1 (2): 161–192. doi:10.1080/17531050701452390. S2CID 154586516. (Includes information about Harare)
- Innocent Chirisa (28 November 2012), "Social Capital Dynamics in the Post-colonial Harare Urbanscape", in Joseph D. Lewandowski and Gregory W. Streich (ed.), Urban social capital, Burlington, VT: Ashgate, p. 199+, ISBN 9781409412243

== Images ==
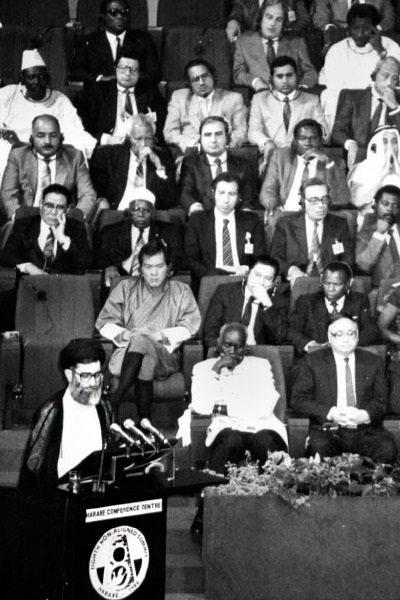
International Summit of the Non-Aligned Movement, held in Harare in 1986

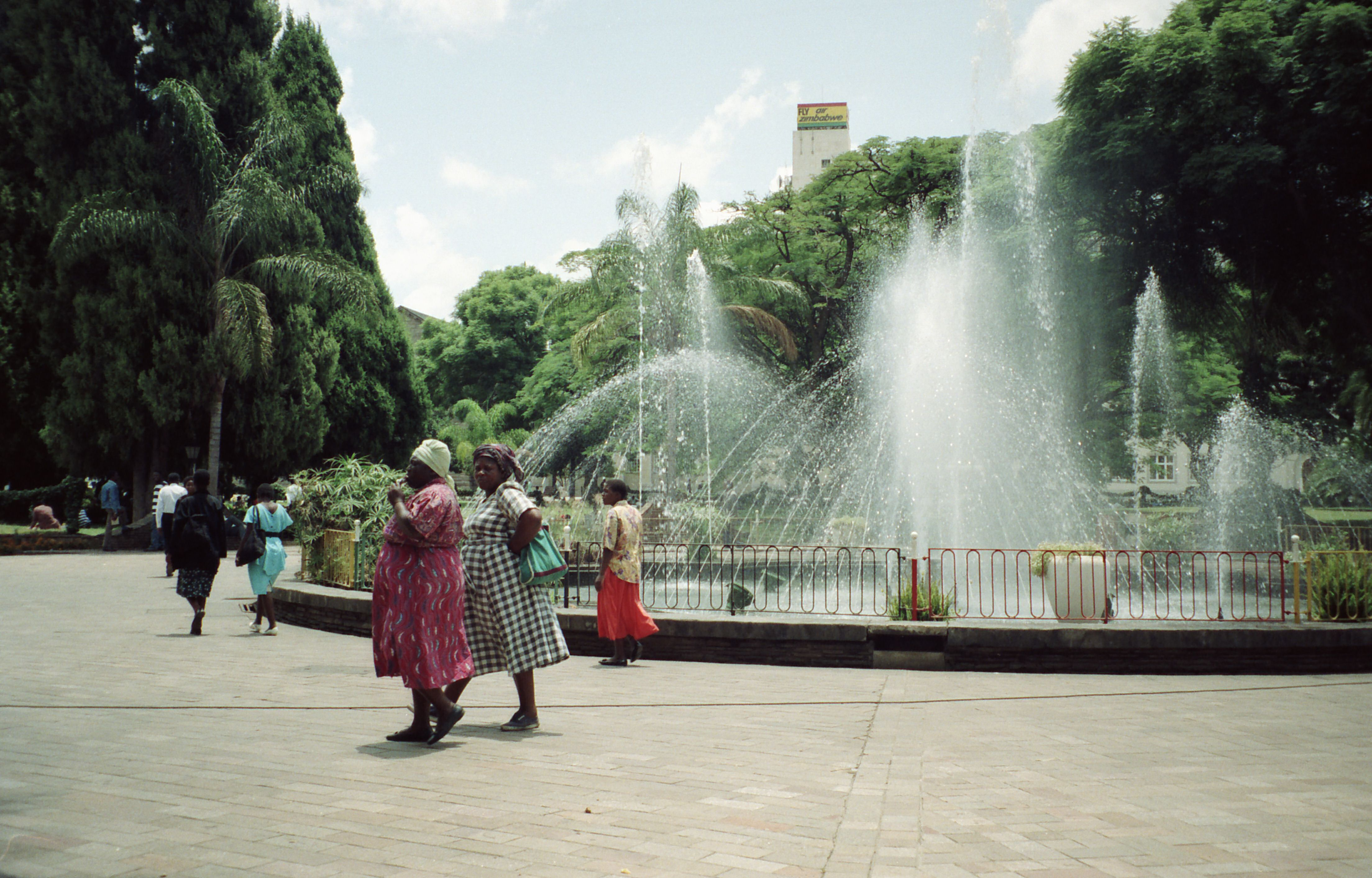
Africa Unity Square, 1992
