= Mombeshora =

Mombeshora is a surname. Notable people with the surname include:

- Douglas Mombeshora, Zimbabwean politician
- Swithun Mombeshora, Zimbabwean politician
