= Acie =

Acie is a given name, and may refer to:

- Acie Earl (born 1970), American former professional basketball player
- Acie Griggs (1923–2007), American baseball player
- Acie Law (born 1985), professional basketball player
- Acie Lumumba (born 1988), Zimbabwean politician
