= Glen View (constituency) =

Constituency of the Parliament of Zimbabwe

- Former National Assembly constituency for the Parliament of Zimbabwe
- Province: Harare
- Region: Harare
- Major settlements: Glen View, Harare

Former constituency
- Abolished: 2008
- Replaced by: Glen View North, Glen View South

Glen View was a constituency represented in the National Assembly of the Parliament of Zimbabwe. The seat was dissolved for the 2008 Zimbabwean general election into Glen View North and Glen View South.

== Members ==
Election	Parliament	Name	Party	Ref.
1985	2nd Parliament of Zimbabwe	Idah Mashonganyika	ZANU–PF	
2000	5th Parliament of Zimbabwe	Paul Madzore	MDC	
2005	6th Parliament of Zimbabwe	Paul Madzore	MDC	

== See also ==
- List of Zimbabwean parliamentary constituencies
