= David Phiri =

Zambian businessman (1937–2012)

David Abel Ray Phiri
- Born: 22 May 1937; Kwekwe, Southern Rhodesia
- Died: 16 January 2012 (aged 74); Lusaka, Zambia
- Education: Goromonzi High School, Bristol University, Oxford University
- Occupation: Central Banker / Miner / Ambassador
- Known for: Governor of the Central Bank of Zambia
- Spouse: Elizabeth Ann Phiri
- Children: 3

David Phiri (22 May 1937 – 16 January 2012) was a Zambian businessman who was a former Governor of the Central Bank of Zambia. He was also Chairman of the Football Association of Zambia.

== Early life and family history ==
David Phiri, or 'DARP', was born in what is now known as Zimbabwe, on 22 May 1937, to Abel Masewera Phiri and Elizabeth Sibanda.

His father, Abel had decided to leave Kapela village near Chadiza, Northern Rhodesia, to find work in the mines of Northern Rhodesia. Abel had the firm belief that the traditional village life of the African was going to end and turned down a Chewa chiefdom to enter the 'new world'. He left Kapela village on foot with two companions and ending up in a mine town called Kwekwe, where he found work at the Globe and Phoenix Mine.

Abel married a local of the Shona people, Elizabeth Sibanda, and David was born in the Globe and Phoenix mine compound, the only child of this marriage.

== Education ==
Phiri was an exceptional student, despite his tendency to play truant to play football which he preferred to the rigors of study, and was noticed by Mr. Green, a manager at the Rhodesia Iron and Steel Company where Phiri's father Abel was now Head Clerk. Green took personal interest in Phiri's education and encouraged him in school and gave him books allowing him to achieve high grades.

=== Primary school ===
In 1945, when Phiri was 8 years old, he was sent to a Presbyterian School, the Gloag Branch Mission School, near Bulawayo. Here he developed his love of gardening, where it was taught as a subject, and it remained his hope that gardening would one day be taught as a school subject in Zambian schools.

=== Secondary school ===
In 1951, Phiri went on to Goromonzi High School. His first headmaster at the school was a Mr. Miller, a Cambridge graduate, inculcated in him the belief that Oxford and Cambridge were the best universities in the world. His belief that there is nothing that stops an African child achieving whatever they want to achieve and race, religion or circumstance were no obstacle to self belief and determination. This spurred Phiri to say that he would go to Oxford University. Phiri led a full school life, becoming Head boy, captaining the school football team, playing football at national schoolboys level as well as being the conductor of the school choir. Phiri graduated from Goromonzi with amongst the best A level results in Southern Africa at the time, with 2 'A's and 2 'B's in English, history, geography and chemistry.

In 1957, to earn a full scholarship to study in the UK, Phiri had to return to Northern Rhodesia for a year and returned to Lusaka where he was given housing in Matero, a high density suburb of Lusaka. He was given his first job at the Government Stores in Lusaka, a job he thoroughly detested, however his lifelong ethic of making the best of all situations allowed him to persevere. Whilst humming a hymn, a white colleague struck up a conversation with him and ended up inviting him to attend the then white only Methodist Church. It was here he met Phyllis and Don Fluck, who soon invited him to live with them, a shocking occurrence in the then racially segregated community. Phiri also met another member of the congregation at trinity, Mr. Henry Fosbrooke (10 October 1908 – 25 April 1996), the head of the Rhodes-Livingstone Institute from 1956. Mr Fosbrooke arranged for Phiri to leave Government Stores and work at the Rhodes-Livingstone Institute.

In June 1958, Phiri was informed that he had been awarded a 'grant' to study for a diploma in social work at Bristol University for two years. He rang Mr Green at Rhodesia Iron and Steel Company who informed his father of the good news. In September of the same year Phiri would get on his first flight and leave to the UK. At his farewell party many people gave him money to help him on his way, further testimony to his astounding ability to connect with people. One of the most generous contributors, with a fifty-pound gift, was a Dr. Scott; father of Zambia's former Republican Vice-president Dr. Guy Scott.

=== University ===
Phiri studied social sciences at the University of Bristol and went on to obtain a degree. He then went to study for a degree in Social Anthropology at Oxford University. At Bristol, he took up golf, and was appointed captain of the university team. At Oxford, his handicap was reduced to three and he played first in the Divots, the second team, against Cambridge in 1961 (winning both his matches) and for the university team in the varsity golf match in 1962 (again winning both matches) and in 1963. He was also elected a member of the Royal and Ancient Golf Club at St Andrews, another first for a black African.

== Career ==
He began his career in 1963 for Anglo-American Corporation in London and joined Anglo-American Corporation in Zambia the following year in 1964. In 1967 he became Director for Central Africa of Anglo American.

From 1974 to 1982, he was managing director of the Roan Consolidated Mines, In 1982 he was appointed Zambia's Ambassador to Scandinavia in Sweden, a position he held until 1984.

In 1981, Phiri became Governor of the Central Bank of Zambia a position he held until 1986, after which he chaired Zambia's Prices and Incomes Commission for a year.

Phiri chaired the boards of several companies in Zambia including Stanbic Bank, Citibank Zambia, Zambia Venture Capital Fund, Madison Insurance, British American Tobacco, Holiday Inn, ZamBeef, Commonwealth Africa Investment Fund, Atlas Copco, Barclays Bank and Blackwood Hodge.

== Other interests ==
Phiri designed the golf course at State House in Lusaka, having introduced Kenneth Kaunda to the game of golf.

In 1991 Phiri led the Zambian Independent Monitoring Team which monitored the fairness of Zambia's first multi-party general election. This appointment was controversial because of Phiri's close relationship with Kenneth Kaunda.

== Sporting achievements ==
Phiri became the first black Oxford Blue in Golf and was a trustee of the Lusaka Golf Club and a member of the Royal & Ancient Golf Club in Scotland.

Phiri was the Chairman of the Football Association of Zambia and various other sports club including the Lusaka Rugby Club. Phiri was awarded the order of "Grant Officers of the Order of the Eagle of Zambia Second Division" for his contribution to sport in Zambia.

== Death ==
He died in Lusaka, Zambia on 16 January 2012 from complications arising from a brain stem infarction he suffered 10 days earlier. He had two sons with Elizabeth Ann Phiri: Sipho Philip Masewera (1967) and Guy David Zingalume (1969). He had two brothers, Dr. Mannasseh Phiri and Chris Phiri, both of whom live in Lusaka, Zambia, and four sisters: Irene Kabwe, Zondiwe Maboshe, Cecilia Phiri and Hlupo Phiri (18 March 1959 – 16 March 1998).
