= Tizirai Gwata =

Zimbabwean physician and politician, first black mayor of Harare

Mayor of Harare
- In office 7 April 1981 – 15 October 1984
- Deputy: Simplisius Chihambakwe; Solomon Tawengwa
- Preceded by: Jack Whiting
- Succeeded by: Oliver Chidawu

Personal details
- Born: March 1943 (age 83) Southern Rhodesia
- Party: ZANU–PF
- Spouse: Rosemary Gwata
- Children: 5
- Education: University of Rhodesia; Makerere University (MMed)

Tizirai Annas Gwata (born March 1943) is a medical doctor and politician who served as the first black mayor of Harare, from 1981 to 1984. He also served as a Harare city councillor for Ward 31. Gwata also lectured as the first full time black lecturer of medicine at the University of Zimbabwe. He retired from political life at the end of his term as mayor in 1985, choosing to focus full time on his medical practice and farming.

== Early life and education ==
Gwata was born in March 1943. Sources give his birth place as the Buhera/Chivhu area, in eastern Southern Rhodesia, and the southern area of Sengwe, near the border with South Africa. He attended Goromonzi High School from 1958 to 1963.

Gwata was one of a group of only six blacks to be accepted into the University of Rhodesia's medical school, comprising the first black medical students in the university's history. He had to leave mid-term in 1966 when the university closed temporarily due to political demonstrations on campus and many black students at the time left to join the liberation struggle. He wrote his final exams for his undergraduate degree in medicine in a refugee camp in Zambia; taking the exam was enabled by white lecturers who snuck out the final exam papers for the black students to take the finals. In 1967, he began studying for his masters at Makerere University in Uganda on a World Health Organization scholarship. There, he was a research fellow in cardiology and graduated with a Master of Medicine degree in 1974.

== Career ==
=== Medicine ===
After earning his degree, Gwata returned to Rhodesia where he worked as a government medical officer at Gatooma General Hospital in Gatooma from 1974 to 1976. In 1976, he became the first black full-time lecturer in medicine at the University of Rhodesia. He continued lecturing until his election as city councillor in 1981. In addition to teaching, Gwata operated his own private practice, Medical Polyclinic and Surgimed Pvt Ltd.

=== Politics ===
In late March 1981, Gwata was elected to the Salisbury City Council for Ward 31, which covered the township of Harare (renamed Mbare in 1982). Representing ZANU–PF, he defeated two other candidates with a margin of over 1,000 votes. Gwata was one of 23 blacks elected to Salisbury's first multiracial city council, with the remaining 13 seats held by whites. In a city council vote held on 3 April 1981, he was unanimously elected mayor. He was sworn in on 7 April, becoming Salisbury's first black mayor. He succeeded Jack Whiting, the last white mayor, who said he was confident the white councillors would cooperate with their new black colleagues. Simplisius Chihambakwe was initially Gwata's deputy mayor, before being succeeded by Solomon Tawengwa in 1983. At his mayoral inauguration, a televised event attended by deputy prime minister Simon Muzenda, seven cabinet ministers, and several government officials, Gwata gave a speech in which he outlined a ten-point plan for his term as mayor. Most notably, he announced plans to change the capital city's name from Salisbury, which he described as "foreign", to Harare, after the African chief who ruled the area when the first white settlers arrived in 1890. The city was officially renamed in 1982, after working with the national government to resolve the issue of who would pay for associated costs, like changes in signage.

As mayor, Gwata had to contend with an exodus of white municipal employees, which was particularly impactful where vacancies for skilled technical and administrative posts could not be immediately filled. On 12 October 1982, Gwata was criticized by the opposition ZAPU party after being quoted in The Herald as saying that members of the ruling ZANU–PF party would be given hiring preference for municipal jobs. In response, Gwata made a statement affirming that municipal employees in Harare are selected without racial or political considerations. As mayor, Gwata addressed Harare's inconsistent water supply with the construction of a pipeline from Lake Chivero that more than doubled the size of the city's Morton Jaffray Water Works reservoir. During his term, the city's sewage system was also modernized, with the construction of two new large treatment facilities that transformed the city's waste into clean water. The treated refuse was then directed back into the rivers flowing into Lake Chivero, augmenting the city's water supply.

Gwata was succeeded as mayor by Oliver Chidawu on 15 October 1984. He continued to serve on the city council representing Ward 31 as late as the 1990s. On 13 April 1991, he became an alderman, an honorary title awarded to councillors who have served ten years or more. As city councillor, Gwata chaired the health, housing, and community service committee. On behalf of the council, he served as the city representative on the board of the University of Zimbabwe, the city building committee, and other organizations. In 1994, there was controversy as Gwata was named on a list of officials reported to have received ill-gotten farmland from a scheme in which the Zimbabwean government seized farms and reportedly redistributed to high ranking government officials.

== Personal life ==
Gwata had five children with his wife Rosemary. The politician Charles Utete is Gwata's brother-in-law. He is Catholic.
