= Sindisiwe van Zyl =

South African physician, radio DJ, and columnist (1976–2021)

Doreen Sindisiwe van Zyl
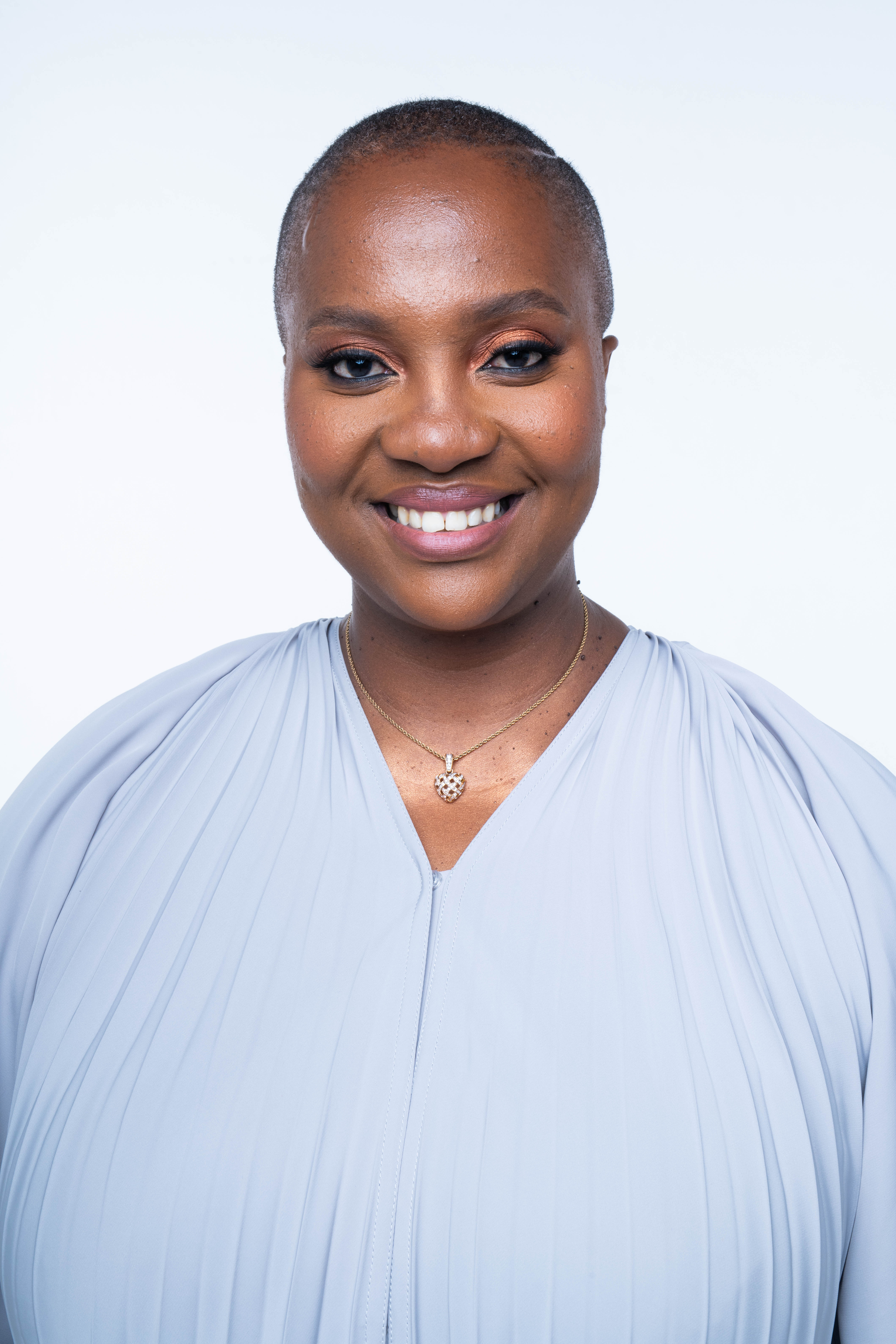
- Born: 3 April 1976; Salisbury, Rhodesia (now Harare, Zimbabwe)
- Died: 10 April 2021 (aged 45); Johannesburg, South Africa
- Other names: Sindi, Dr Sindi, Doc Sindi
- Citizenship: South African
- Education: University of Pretoria (BSc, MB ChB)
- Occupations: Physician, radio DJ, columnist
- Spouse: Marinus van Zyl (m. 2004; died 2021)
- Children: 2
- Parents: Muchadeyi Masunda (father); Rita Mahamba-Sithole (mother)
- Website: web.archive.org/web/20220102021735/https://drsindi.co.za/

Sindisiwe van Zyl (née Mahamba-Sithole; 3 April 1976 – 10 April 2021) was a Zimbabwean-born South African physician, radio DJ, columnist, health activist and researcher known for using social and mainstream media to share HIV-related, mental health, reproductive health, other medical and public health information. She won several awards for her work. Because of her extensive public health advocacy, she was known as "the people's doctor".

== Early life and education ==
Van Zyl was born on 3 April 1976 in Salisbury, Rhodesia (now Harare, Zimbabwe). For secondary education she attended Arundel School. For tertiary education she attended the University of Pretoria, where she obtained a Bachelor of Science in human physiology and psychology and a Bachelor of Medicine, Bachelor of Surgery degree. Dr Sindisiwe Van Zyl interned at Chris Hani Baragwanath Hospital. In 2004, she married Marinus van Zyl.

== Career ==
She used Twitter, mainly, to inform and engage about HIV particularly prevention of mother-to-child transmission. She also appeared frequently on TV, radio and other media platforms. She shared about her personal journey with depression and physician burnout. Dr. van Zyl chronicled how she lost 41 kg while on a Banting diet. She was a natural short sleeper requiring about 4 hours of sleep per night while functioning normally. Her scientific research has included guidelines to support HIV-affected individuals and couples to achieve pregnancy safely and COVID-19 and HIV co-infection. She held various roles in the South African Medical Association. She was a member of Médecins Sans Frontières Southern Africa's Board of directors. Because of her extensive public health advocacy, she was known as "the people's doctor".

Her media affiliations included:

- Columnist for Health24, Bona magazine, Choma magazine
- Radio DJ, Kaya FM hosting Sidebar with Sindi
- Guest artist in the soap opera 7de Laan

== Death ==
On 10 April 2021, she died at the age of 45 from COVID-19. Her funeral was on 15 April 2021. Memorials of Dr Sindi included people posting themselves on social media wearing dresses with pockets, which was her signature style.

== Awards and honors ==
- Mail & Guardian (2012) 200 Young South Africans
- Glamour Women of the Year (2018) - awarded for excellence and activism in health and medicine
- Amref Health Africa posthumous Africa Health Agenda International Conference 2023 Women in Global Health Award
