= Sarah Kachingwe =

- Born: 1936; Rusape, Zimbabwe
- Died: 2012 (aged 75–76); Greendale, Harare, Zimbabwe
- Education: University College of Rhodesia
- Occupations: Politician, activist
- Spouse: Joe Kachingwe

Sarah Kachingwe (née Chavunduka; 1936–2012) was a Zimbabwean politician and activist. She is the first black female to enroll at the University College of Rhodesia in 1957. She went on to become the secretary for Information, Posts and Telecommunications and also to serve on the board of Zimpapers and the Forestry Commission.

== Biography ==
Kachingwe was born in the Rusape, Zimbabwe, in 1936. She attended Goromonzi High School. In 1957 she enrolled in the University College of Rhodesia, becoming the first black woman to do so. She graduated with a bachelor of arts degree in English and History.

Kachingwe died at her home in Greendale, Harare, in 2012 from complications related to heart disease. Her funeral was attended by, among others, Deputy Prime Minister Professor Arthur Mutambara and Malawi's ambassador to Zimbabwe Dr Richard Mpoya. She was laid to rest at Harare's Greendale Cemetery.

== Legacy ==
At her funeral, Deputy Prime Minister Arthur Mutambara presented the Flag of Zimbabwe to Mrs Kachingwe's husband to symbolize her status as a "liberation war heroine". Kachingwe was the first black female student to enroll at the University College of Rhodesia in 1957, overcoming discrimination to complete her degree. She later received an honorary degree from Zimbabwe Women's University, which she described as her "greatest professional achievement" because it showed her education had benefited others beyond herself. Zimbabwe's Minister of Media, Information and Publicity, Webster Shamu, said Kachingwe "championed the majority’s cause, especially in the education sector" and helped craft laws that empowered women after independence. During the liberation struggle, she assisted war fighters while living in Malawi and later served on ZANU-PF's national executive.
