= Jock Alves =

Rhodesian epidemiologist and politician, mayor of Salisbury

Member of the Senate of Rhodesia
- In office 1970s – 10 February 1979

Mayor of Salisbury
- In office 2 August 1972 – 7 August 1974
- Preceded by: Roger Bates
- Succeeded by: Tony Tanser

Personal details
- Born: c. 1909 Scotland, United Kingdom
- Died: 10 February 1979 (aged 70) Salisbury, Rhodesia
- Party: Rhodesian Front
- Education: London School of Hygiene & Tropical Medicine (BA, PhD)
- Occupation: Epidemiologist, politician

William "Jock" Alves (c. 1909 – 10 February 1979) was a Scottish-born Rhodesian physician and politician who served as mayor of Salisbury (now Harare) from 1972 to 1974. He later served as a member of the Senate of Rhodesia until his death. An epidemiologist by profession, he directed a bilharzia research laboratory in Salisbury and later worked with the World Health Organization on parasitic disease projects.

== Medical career ==
Alves was of Scottish origin. Alves earned his Bachelor of Arts from a South African university. He pursued his doctorate at the London School of Hygiene & Tropical Medicine, but had to return to Southern Rhodesia in 1947 before completing his degree. He later returned and was awarded a PhD in 1953.

Alves was a physician and was the director of the Bilharzia and Malaria Research Laboratory in Salisbury from 1944 into the 1950s. He also belonged to the department of parasitology at the London School of Hygiene & Tropical Medicine. He was considered an international authority on bilharzia, and during his tenure at the laboratory developed a treatment for the disease that was successfully tested on 25 patients. He served on the World Health Organization (WHO) expert committee on parasitic diseases. In 1958, he led a WHO project in the Philippines. In 1961, he was senior advisor on a WHO malaria eradication project in the Solomon Islands.

== Political career ==
Alves was elected to the Salisbury City Council and served as deputy mayor from 1971 to 1972 under Mayor Roger Bates. On 2 August 1972, he was sworn in as mayor Salisbury at a special meeting of the city council. He served as mayor until 7 August 1974, when he was succeeded by Tony Tanser. Alves continued to serve on the city council, and later became a member of the Rhodesian senate. In 1978, as chairman of the city council's African affairs committee, Alves introduced a scheme to set up a two-tier system in which blacks and whites would each have municipal representation on their own city councils. The proposal passed without debate in January 1978. In June 1978, Alves made a speech before the senate in which he urged the Rhodesian government to include the African nationalist leader Joshua Nkomo, and possibly Robert Mugabe, in any potential settlement negotiations. He was a member of the ruling Rhodesian Front party, and was for a time a party spokesman.

Alves died at Andrew Fleming Hospital in Salisbury on 10 February 1979, aged 70.
