= Harare City Council =

Local governing body of Harare, Zimbabwe

- Coat of arms of the City of Harare

Type
- Type: City council

Leadership
- Mayor: Ian Makone (CCC)
- Deputy Mayor: Kudzai Mazhombe (CCC)
- Seats: 46

Elections
- Voting system: First-past-the-post
- Last election: 2018
- Next election: 2023

Meeting place
- Town House

Website
- Official website

The Harare City Council is the local governing body of Harare, the capital of Zimbabwe. It is composed of 46 councillors, each representing a different ward. It is headed by the mayor of Harare, who is assisted by a deputy mayor. The current mayor is Ian Makone of the Citizens Coalition for Change (CCC), and the deputy mayor is Kudzai Mazhombe.

== Current councillors ==
The following is a list of Harare city councillors since the 2018 election.

Ward	Area	Councillor	Party	Notes	Ref.
1	Harare South	Tendai Katsaria	MDC Alliance		
2	Harare Central	Eugenia Chipfiwa	MDC Alliance		
3	Mbare	Tracy Chagarasango	MDC Alliance		
4	Mbare	Martin Matinyanya	ZANU–PF		
5	Belvedere	Midia Mudariki	MDC Alliance		
6	Harare Central	Charles Nyatsuro	CCC	Recalled 2020; reelected 26 March 2022.	
7	Avondale	Happymore Gotora	CCC	Recalled 2020; reelected 26 March 2022.	
8	Highlands	Keith Charumbira	CCC	Recalled 2020; reelected 26 March 2022.	
9	Greendale	Stewart Mutizwa	MDC Alliance		
10	Sunningdale	Hammy Madzingira	CCC	Recalled 2020; reelected 26 March 2022.	
11	Mbare	Anthony Shingadeya	MDC Alliance		
12	Mbare	Patson Mangwiro-Chikwaka	MDC Alliance		
13	Southerton	Brian Matione	MDC Alliance		
14	Kambuzuma	Costa Mande	CCC	Recalled 2020; reelected 26 March 2022.	
15	Warren Park	Tichaona Mhetu	MDC Alliance		
16	Mabelreign	Denford Ngadziore	CCC	Recalled 2020; reelected 26 March 2022.	
17	Mount Pleasant	Jacob Mafume	CCC	Recalled 2020; reelected 26 March 2022.	
18	Borrowdale	Ian Makone	CCC		
19	Mabvuku	Munyaradzi Kufahakutizwi	CCC	Recalled 2020; reelected 26 March 2022.	
20	Tafara	Mercy Kasvosve	CCC		
21	Mabvuku	Scott Sakupwanya	ZANU–PF	Elected in 26 March 2022 by-election.	
22	Hatfield	Theresa Manase	MDC Alliance		
23	Waterfalls	Stan Manyenga	CCC	Recalled 2020; reelected 26 March 2022.	
24	Highfield	Lovemore Makuwerere	CCC		
25	Highfield	Luckson Mukunguma	MDC Alliance		
26	Highfield	Maxwell Dutuma	CCC	Elected in 26 March 2022 by-election.	
27	Glen Norah	Herbert Gomba	CCC	Recalled 2020; reelected 26 March 2022.	
28	Glen Norah	Chihoma Runyowa	CCC	Recalled 2020; reelected 26 March 2022.	
29	Glen Norah	Tendai Matafi	MDC Alliance		
30	Glen View	Charles Chidagu	CCC	Recalled 2020; reelected 26 March 2022.	
31	Glen View	Tonderai Chakeredza	CCC	Recalled 2020; reelected 26 March 2022.	
32	Glen View	Gaudencia Marera	CCC	Recalled 2020; reelected 26 March 2022.	
33	Budiriro	Joseph Kunashe	MDC Alliance		
34	Mufakose	Simon Mapanzure	CCC	Recalled 2020; reelected 26 March 2022.	
35	Mufakose	Enock Mupamawonde	CCC	Recalled 2020; reelected 26 March 2022.	
36	Mufakose	Loveness Gomba	MDC Alliance		
37	Kuwadzana	Jason Kautsa	CCC	Recalled 2020; reelected 26 March 2022.	
38	Kuwadzana	Clifton Zumba	MDC Alliance		
39	Dzivarasekwa	Gilbert Hadebe	CCC	Recalled 2020; reelected 26 March 2022.	
40	Dzivarasekwa	Stephen Dhliwayo	CCC	Recalled 2020; reelected 26 March 2022.	
41	Marlborough	Kudzai Kadzombe	CCC	Recalled 2020; reelected 26 March 2022.	
42	Hatcliffe	Elvis Ruzani	CCC		
43	Budiriro	Blessing Duma	CCC	Elected in 26 March 2022 by-election.	
44	Kuwadzana	Adonia Shoko	MDC Alliance	Elected in 8 February 2020 by-election.	
45	Kuwadzana	Mandere Girisoti	CCC	Recalled 2020; reelected 26 March 2022.	
46	Harare East	Stewart Wutawunashe	MDC Alliance		
