= Tony Gara =

Zimbabwean politician (1939–2006)

Deputy Minister of Local Government, Rural and Urban Development
- In office 1995–2000
- President: Robert Mugabe

Member of Parliament
- In office 1990–2000
- Preceded by: Constituency created
- Succeeded by: Tichaona Munyanyi
- Constituency: Mbare East

Mayor of Harare
- In office 29 July 1985 – 1986
- Deputy: Solomon Tawengwa
- Preceded by: Oliver Chidawu
- Succeeded by: Solomon Tawengwa

Deputy Mayor of Harare
- In office 1984–1985
- Succeeded by: Solomon Tawengwa

Personal details
- Born: 17 April 1939 Gatooma, Southern Rhodesia (now Kadoma, Zimbabwe)
- Died: 14 November 2006 (aged 67) Harare, Zimbabwe
- Party: ZANU–PF
- Children: 7

Oriah Anthony Gara (17 April 1939 – 14 November 2006) was a Zimbabwean businessman and politician. He was a member of the House of Assembly of Zimbabwe for Mbare East from 1990 to 2000 and served as deputy minister of local government, rural and urban development from 1995 until 2000. Before entering Parliament, he was a member of the Harare City Council and served as mayor of Harare from 1985 to 1986.

Born in Gatooma, Gara worked as an accountant for companies in Southern Rhodesia and Malawi. He returned to Rhodesia in 1975 to become chief executive officer of Negondo Industries, a chemical and cosmetics manufacturing company. Having joined the Zimbabwe African National Union (ZANU) in Malawi, he held a series of leadership positions within the party in Rhodesia and later Zimbabwe, eventually serving as the ZANU–PF chairman for Harare Province.

In 1979, Gara was elected to the city council in Salisbury (renamed Harare in 1982), becoming its first black member. He served as deputy mayor from 1984 to 1985, and was then elected mayor, serving for one year. In 1990, he was elected to Parliament and made news for a controversial statement he made comparing President Robert Mugabe to Jesus Christ. He was reelected in 1995 and named deputy minister of local government and national housing in Mugabe's cabinet, but lost reelection in 2000 to the candidate of the newly-formed Movement for Democratic Change. He died of cancer six years later.

== Early life and education ==
Gara was born on 17 April 1939 in Gatooma, Southern Rhodesia. He was raised in rural Zvimba District. He attended the Mashonganyika, Mbizi, and Tsungai primary schools between 1950 and 1957. He attended Moleli High School in Chegutu District, and later completed his Advanced Levels via correspondence. He went on to earn a diploma in accountancy.

== Career ==
=== Business career ===
In 1963, Gara began working as an assistant accountant for Goodwood Hotels, before going to Malawi to work as an accountant for Blantyre Hotels in 1966. In 1972, he began working at the Rennies Group as a divisional accountant. In 1975, he left Malawi and returned to Rhodesia, where he joined Blue Moon Investments as group accountant. In 1980, he was named chief executive officer of Negondo Industries, a chemical and cosmetics manufacturing company, a position he held until 1995. After leaving parliament, Gara ran his own chemicals company and also owned a chain of hair salons.

=== Political career ===
Gara joined the Zimbabwe African National Union (ZANU) upon its formation in Malawi. From 1980 to 1982, he was chairman of the party's Harare Central district. Between 1982 and 1984, he served as chairman of the Mount Pleasant district and as the party's deputy secretary for administration for Harare Province. He was appointed ZANU–PF secretary for administration for Harare Province in 1987. He became a member of the party's central committee in 1994. In 1998, he was elected ZANU–PF provincial chair for Harare Province, defeating former ZAPU member Rodrick Nyandoro. His deputy chairman, Oliver Chidawu, was a fellow former Harare mayor.

Gara became the first black member of the Harare City Council (then Salisbury) in 1979 when he was elected to a seat representing Greendale. He later became the city's first black alderman, an honorary title awarded to councillors who have served ten years or more. He served as deputy mayor from 1984 to 1985. He was elected mayor of Harare on 29 July 1985, with Solomon Tawengwa as his deputy.

In the April 1990 election, Gara was elected to Parliament for the Mbare East constituency. He received 12,522 votes out of 17,880 cast, easily defeating Zimbabwe Unity Movement candidate Biston David, who came in second with 4,420 votes. That year, he made news for a controversial statement he made comparing President Robert Mugabe to Jesus. In his first speech before Parliament, he said, "This country and its people should thank the Almighty for giving us His only other son, by the name of Robert Gabriel Mugabe." Gara's statement was criticized by churches and individuals within Zimbabwe, with letters to local newspapers accusing him of blasphemy and sycophancy. The Catholic magazine Moto argued that Zimbabwe did not need a cult of personality like that of Kim Il Sung in North Korea. Gara later denied making the comparison and said his words were taken out of context, asking, "How can I liken Mugabe to Jesus? There is only one Jesus and he can't be matched by anybody."

Gara was reelected to Parliament in 1995 with 15,762 votes (86%), defeating Patricia Mpange of ZANU–Ndonga, who received 2,510 votes. After the election, he was named to the new cabinet as deputy minister of local government, rural and urban development, an office he held for five years. He was very critical of the United States, saying in 1995 "John Major has kept every promise he ever made to Zimbabwe, that's something that Bill Clinton simply cannot say." He lost his bid for reelection in 2000 by a significant margin, receiving 4,265 votes against 10,754 votes cast for Tichaona Munyanyi, the candidate of the newly-formed Movement for Democratic Change opposition party. On 4 January 2002, Gara's name was included on a government list published in The Herald of around 100,000 black Zimbabweans selected to receive land seized from white farmers. Gara was listed as having been allocated a commercial farm seized from a white farmer in Mashonaland West, the country's richest agricultural province.

In 2004, Gara sought to rejoin the ZANU–PF Central Committee, but lost to Edward Chataika. In 2005, he attempted to run for Parliament in the Mbare constituency, but lost the primary election to Tendai Savanhu. In May 2005, Gara was named to a five-person monitoring committee created by local government minister Ignatius Chombo to wrest authority over Harare from the capital's MDC-dominated city council. In July 2005, Gara and colleague Shepherd Chironga filed a Z$110 million defamation lawsuit against Namion Modern Chirwa, chairman of ZANU–PF's Joshua Nkomo District in Mbare. Gara and Chironga claimed that Chirwa had accused them of being homosexuals in front of a church congregation. Chirwa denied making the statement in question and said the issue was political. He claimed that Gara was bitter after the party's Harare Province passed a vote of no confidence in him earlier that year for his alleged attempts to set up a rival party district in Mbare.

== Later life and death ==
Gara died on 14 November 2006 around 6 a.m. at St Anne's Hospital in Harare. He had been suffering from cancer for almost six years, and had recently been in and out of the hospital. He was survived by his wife, seven children, and six grandchildren. Mourners gathered at his home in the Mount Pleasant suburb of Harare, and he was buried two days later on 16 November. President Robert Mugabe, who was Gara's cousin, spoke at his funeral.
