= Ronald Snapper =

Rhodesian politician

Ronald Snapper served as secretary of the Inter-territorial Organization for Eurafrican Organizations in Rhodesia, now known as Zimbabwe.
