= William Harvey Brown =

American naturalist

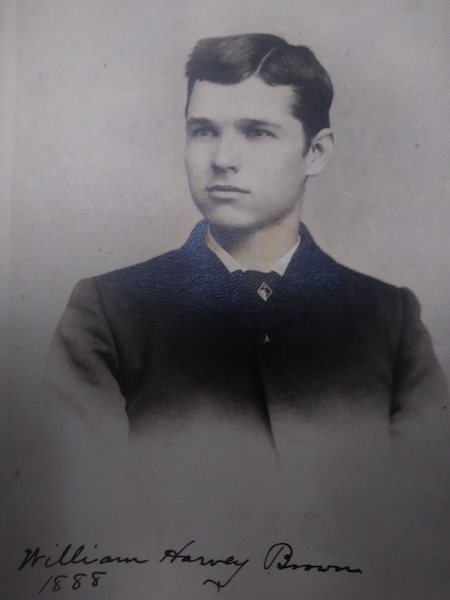
- Brown in 1888

Mayor of Salisbury
- In office 1909-1910

Personal details
- Born: August 22, 1862 Des Moines, Iowa, U.S.
- Died: April 5, 1913 (aged 50) Salisbury, Company Rhodesia (now Harare, Zimbabwe)
- Occupation: Naturalist, soldier, local politician

Military service
- Allegiance: United Kingdom
- Service: British South Africa Company
- Years of service: 1893–1897
- Battles/wars: First Matabele War; Second Matabele War

William Harvey Brown (August 22, 1862 – April 5, 1913) was an American naturalist who later settled in Rhodesia. Whilst studying at the University of Kansas Brown volunteered with the National Museum of Natural History and took part in collecting expeditions in the US. While employed by the Smithsonian Institution he took part in an expedition to the Belgian Congo to observe the Solar eclipse of December 22, 1889. Brown collected a wide variety of specimens for the national museum and, as a result, became known as "Curio Brown". Brown remained in South Africa after the expedition and joined the British South Africa Company's 1890 Pioneer Column expedition that annexed Mashonaland. He afterwards fought in the First Matabele War and was awarded significant tracts of land in Rhodesia. Brown was wounded during the 1896-97 rebellion in Mashonaland and returned briefly to the US where he published a book about his experiences. Brown returned to Rhodesia and was elected to the Salisbury city council, including a period as mayor, and to the Southern Rhodesian Legislative Council.

== Early life ==
William Harvey Brown was born on August 22, 1862, in Des Moines, Iowa. After attending public schools in his home town he studied at the University of Kansas in Lawrence. At university he was a member of the Phi Gamma Delta fraternity and was elected president of his freshman class. Brown majored in natural history, receiving a bachelor of science degree, and studied under Professors Francis H. Snow and Lewis Lindsay Dyche. In 1886 Brown was invited by William Temple Hornaday, chief taxidermist at the National Museum of Natural History, to join the museum as a volunteer assistant for the summer. He joined Hornaday's expedition to Montana which gathered skins and skeletons of the bison. Brown later collected, with Dyche, specimens from Las Vegas, New Mexico, including two bison that came to be the centerpiece of the museum of the University of Kansas. After graduation Brown joined the natural history department of the Smithsonian Institution.

== 1889 eclipse expedition ==
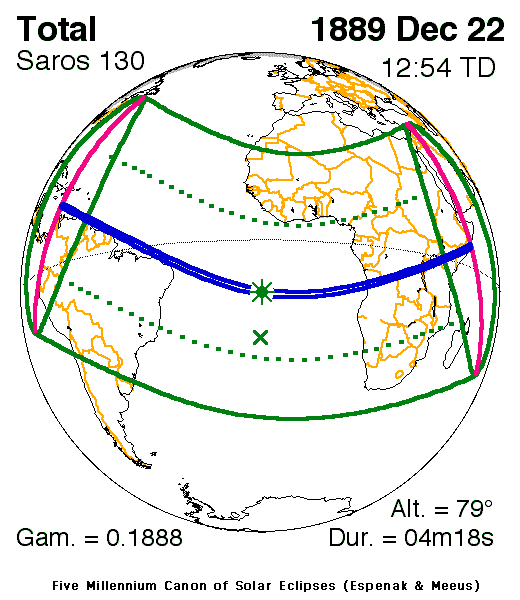
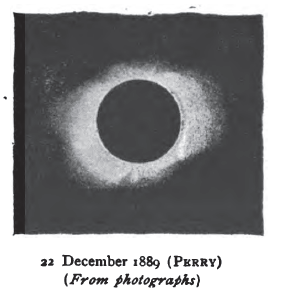
Path and photograph of the December 22, 1889 eclipse

Brown was attached to the US government's expedition to the west coast of Africa to observe the solar eclipse of December 22, 1889. An arrangement with expedition leader Professor David Peck Todd allowed Brown to accompany the party to collect natural history samples for the National Museum. The expedition sailed on October 16, 1889, aboard the USS Pensacola, stopping at the Azores en-route where Brown, assisted by officers and men from the ship, collected samples of fish and seashells. Brown accompanied the expedition to the Congo via Freetown, Sierra Leone; Elmina, Ghana; Angola (including Luanda and the Cuanza River), Cape Town (South Africa), St Helena and Ascension Island.

Brown's collections from the expedition were returned to the National Museum in June 1890. They included 33 mammals from 16 species, well over 100 molluscs and 250 species of insect, almost all of which were not previously represented in the museum collection. He also sent specimens of 16 species of freshwater fish from the Quanza River and a large quantity of saltwater fish, including some recovered from an abandoned canoe discovered at sea off the coast of Sierra Leone. A quantity of birds was also included, but the collection of reptiles was somewhat damaged in transit and did not represent any new species. Brown also dispatched a number of geological specimens and ethnological items such as idols, pottery and baskets. As a result of this expedition Brown gained the nickname "Curio Brown" for his collecting prowess.

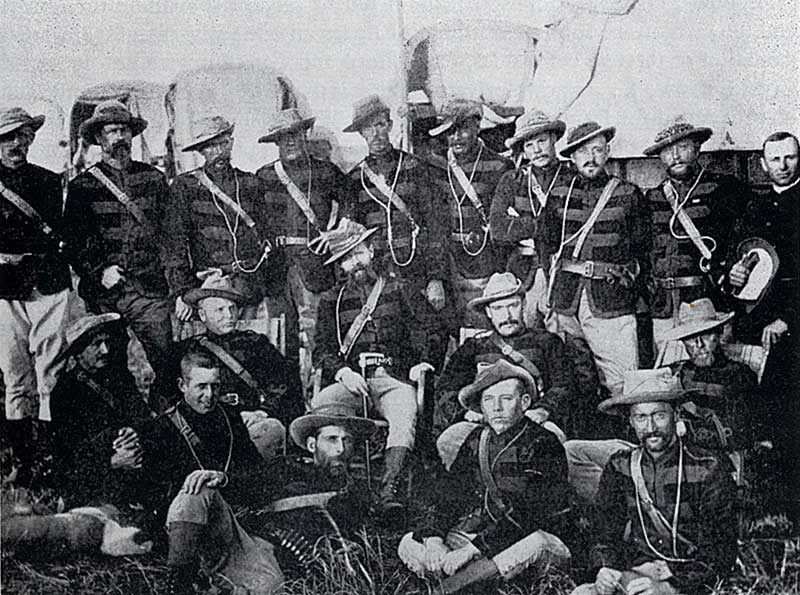
Officers of the Pioneer Corps

After the expedition Brown spent some time in South Africa collecting specimens where, on April 10, 1890, he joined the British South Africa Company's Pioneer Corps for their Pioneer Column expedition. He accompanied the column of 200 white men and 400 African men to Mashonaland, which was annexed to the company's territory. Brown continued his work as a naturalist and the company arranged to carry his collections to Kimberley free of charge, from which the South African government railway carried them (also free of charge) to Cape Town. The collections included some live tortoises and chameleons together with rock samples from the Kimberley Diamond Mines for the National Museum and other specimens that went to the Cape Town Museum.

== Later life ==
Brown fought in the First Matabele War of 1893-94 and in return for his service was granted 13,000 acres (5,300 ha) of land in what became Rhodesia. Brown was severely wounded while fighting against Shona rebels during the Second Matabele War. He afterwards returned to the US where, in 1899, he published an account of his experiences as On the South African Frontier.

Brown returned to Rhodesia afterwards and settled on his farm, some 5 miles (8.0 km) outside of Salisbury. Having obtained British citizenship Brown served on the city council of Salisbury and was mayor between 1909 and 1910. He was also a member of the Chamber of Mines, Chamber of Commerce, the Mashonaland Farmers' Association, Rhodesia Agricultural Union, Rhodesia Agricultural Society and the Rhodesia Horticultural Society. Brown served on the Southern Rhodesian Legislative Council between 1909 and 1911. He died on April 5, 1913, in Salisbury. Brown has been described as having "helped to found" Rhodesia.
