= Hatfield, Harare =

Residential suburb in Harare, Zimbabwe

Coordinates: 17°52′45″S 31°04′27″E

Hatfield is a middle income residential suburb in the south of Harare, Zimbabwe. The suburb was laid out in 1920.

== History ==
Hatfield was named after the ancestral home of the Marquess of Salisbury. It was first settled on by Robert Snodgrass and David Mitchell, two transport riders who made a fortune selling whisky to newly arrived settlers in 1891. The partnership broke up shortly after another property, a subdivision of the farm, near today's Willowvale, which was given the name of Ardbennie, had been acquired.

William Edward Webb was granted title the nearby area of Prospect in 1894, which later became a residential subdivision, although little is known of his activities. Hatfield takes its name from Hatfield, Hertfordshire.

== Politics ==
Hatfield is part of the Hatfield constituency for elections to the Parliament of Zimbabwe.

== Notable people ==
The following people have resided in Hatfield:

- William Harper, Rhodesian politician
- Acie Lumumba
- Lance Smith, Rhodesian politician
- Derek Chisora heavyweight boxer

== See also ==
- Waterfalls, Harare
