= Glen View North =

Zimbabwean constituency

- National Assembly constituency for the Parliament of Zimbabwe
- District: Harare
- Province: Harare
- Electorate: 35,579 (2023)
- Major settlements: Glen View, Harare

Current constituency
- Created: 2008
- Number of members: 1
- Party: Citizens Coalition for Change
- Member: Happymore Chidziva
- Created from: Glen View

Glen View North is a constituency represented in the National Assembly of the Parliament of Zimbabwe. The current MP is Happymore Chidziva of the Citizens Coalition for Change since the 2018 election.

== Members ==
Election	Name	Party
2018	Happymore Chidziva	MDC Alliance
2023	Happymore Chidziva	Citizens Coalition for Change

== See also ==
- List of Zimbabwean parliamentary constituencies
