= Emmanuel Chiroto =

Zimbabwean politician

4th Mayor of Harare
- In office June 15, 2008 – June 2008
- Preceded by: Elias Mudzuri
- Succeeded by: Muchadeyi Masunda
- Constituency: Harare

Personal details
- Born: Harare, Zimbabwe
- Party: N/A

Emmanuel Chiroto was the deputy mayor of Harare, Zimbabwe. In the March 2008 election, the Movement for Democratic Change (MDC) won 45 of the 46 local council seats in Harare. Chiroto, who is a member of the MDC was elected as Mayor of Harare by the councillors on June 15. Ignatius Chombo, the Minister of Local Government, had not sworn in the new local administrations, and because the elected Harare councillors were not allowed to meet at Harare's Town House, they met elsewhere to elect Chiroto. On the night of June 16, Chiroto's house in the suburb of Hatcliffe was attacked and destroyed by ZANU-PF supporters; Chiroto believed that petrol bombs were used. Chiroto's wife, Abigail, and his four-year-old son were taken away by the attackers, although his son was delivered to a police station on June 16. Chiroto himself was not present when the attack occurred. His wife was later found murdered on June 18, 2008, at a farm in outlying Borrowdale. Chiroto went into hiding following this incident.
