= Alfred Makwarimba =

Zimbabwean politician

Alfred Makwarimba is the president of the Zimbabwe Federation of Trade Unions (ZFTU). The ZFTU is organized and run by the ruling ZANU–PF party, and is not to be confused with the Zimbabwe Congress of Trade Unions. Makwarimba's presidency has been controversial. In 2006, the ZFTU voted to expel him as president. In 2009, the ZFTU announced that Makwarimba was suspended pending a police investigation into allegations of unspecified misconduct, although the Zimbabwean government continued to consider him the president. In both instances, he either retained his presidency or regained it later, because news articles from 2007 to 2018 continue to refer to him as the president of the ZFTU. In January 2018, the Teachers' Union of Zimbabwe (TUZ) sought to have Makwarimba arrested over allegations that Makwarimba and the ZFTU have breached a court order to interfere with the TUZ's affairs.

== Policies ==
Makwarimba has criticized the government's 2014 plan to match salaries to productivity. In 2018, he urged the government to avoid returning to the Economic Structural Adjustment Programme.
