= Oliver Saunyama =

- Died: 22 January 1980; Salisbury, Zimbabwe
- Children: 6

Oliver Saunyama (died 22 January 1980) was a teacher and a ZANU (Sithole) representative in Botswana in 1973. He was a Pan-Africanist.

== History ==
Born in Umtali, Southern Rhodesia and trained as a teacher in the 1950s at St Augustine's Mission in Penhalonga. With this position came great responsibility, but it also meant he had to be absent from home often. Five years later, he was recalled by the party and he was promoted to be the secretary for welfare. The position also carried with it a seat on the ZANU Central Committee.

== Family ==
He was married to his wife Bessie Saunyama and had six children.

== Death ==
Oliver was shot and killed on 22 January 1980 by two assailants armed with AK-47 assault rifles while reversing from his house on his way to work. He died instantly from the wounds he sustained. One of his sons witnessed the killing. The reasons put forward for his killing have a link to his strong condemnation for corruption.
