= Charles Shanyurai Majange =

Zimbabwean politician

Charles Shanyurai Majange is a member of the Pan-African Parliament from Zimbabwe.

== See also ==
- List of members of the Pan-African Parliament
