= Max Mnkandla =

Zimbabwean politician

Max Mnkandla is the President of the Zimbabwe Liberators' Peace Initiative. He fought for the Zimbabwe People's Revolutionary Army (ZIPRA) in the Rhodesian Bush War.

His father, Siqanywana, died in the Gukurahundi massacres of the 1980s. When Information Minister Nathan Shamuyarira defended the massacres in October 2006, Mnkandla said Shamuyarira's comments show he is "not only suffering from 1880s hangover — the feeling that the Ndebele also did the same to the Shonas — it also shows that Shamuyarira is now old and should retire."
