= List of mayors of Harare =

This is a list of mayors of Harare (previously Salisbury until 1982), the capital of Zimbabwe. All mayors are members of the Harare City Council who are elected by their fellow councillors. The current mayor since 21 December 2023 is Jacob Mafume.

== List of mayors ==
Mayor	Term start	Term end	Party	Ref.
William Fairbridge	1 December 1897	1899		
H. J. Deary	10 August 1899	9 August 1900		
Joseph van Praagh	9 August 1900	1901		
G. D. Bates	1901	1903		
Ralph Milton Cleveland	1903	1905		
Edward Coxwell	1905	1906		
John Pascoe	1906	1908		
Hugh William Ross	1908	1909		
William Harvey Brown	1909	1910		
Ralph Milton Cleveland	1910	1912		
James Lawson	1912	1913		
Edward Coxwell	1913	1914		
H. L. Lezard	1914	1915		
W. Martin Epton	1915	1916		
H. L. Lezard	1916	1917		
George Elcombe	1917	1920		
Ralph Milton Cleveland	1920	1921		
George Elcombe	1921	1923		
William Smith	1923	1924		
John Reid Rowland	1924	1925		
W. Hill	1925	1927		
Jacob Smit	1927	1928		
John McChlery	1928	1929		
J. E. Stone	1929	1930		
J. W. Elsworth	1930	1931		
Robert Lawrence Phillips	1931	1932		
Ralph Milton Cleveland	1932	1933		
John Reid Rowland	1933	1934		
Leslie B. Fereday	1934	1937		
N. A. Philip	1937	1938		
D. McDonald	1938	1940		
O. P. Wheeler	1940	1941		
D. McDonald	1941	1942		
Gladys Maasdorp	1942	1943	Labour	
Charles Olley	1943	1945		
Noel St. Quintin	1945	1947		
Morton Jaffray	1947	1949		
Ralph Milton Cleveland	1949	1951		
S. W. Sandford	1951	1953		
Henry Bain Auld	1953	1954		
James Watson Swan	1954	1955		
Harry Pichanick	1955	1957		
L. J. Boshoff	1957	1958		
Leslie Pocket	August 1958	5 August 1959		
Herbert Posselt	5 August 1959	1960		
Dennis Divaris	1960	1961		
Ivor Pitch	11 August 1961	1962		
William Steer	1962	1963		
Frank Clements	1963	1964		
Bernard Ponter	1964	1965	Rhodesian Front	
Gordon Harper	1965	10 August 1967	Rhodesian Front	
Ivor Pitch	10 August 1967	August 1968	Independent	
Florence Chisholm	August 1968	1969	Rhodesian Front	
John Lovatt	1969	1970	Rhodesian Front	
T. E. Taylor	1970	1971	Rhodesian Front	
Roger Bates	1971	2 August 1972	Independent	
Jock Alves	2 August 1972	7 August 1974	Rhodesian Front	
Tony Tanser	7 August 1974	1975	Independent	
Douglas Tanner	1975	1976	Rhodesian Front	
Roy Wright	1976	3 August 1977		
Ronald Cowan	3 August 1977	1978		
Arthur Wilkins	1978	August 1979		
Jack Whiting	August 1979	7 April 1981		
Tizirai Gwata	7 April 1981	15 October 1984	ZANU–PF	
Oliver Chidawu	15 October 1984	1985	ZANU–PF	
Tony Gara	29 July 1985	1986	ZANU–PF	
Solomon Tawengwa	1 October 1986	1988	ZANU–PF	
Jabulani Thembani	1988	1989	ZANU–PF	
Simon Chikwavaire	1989	1993	ZANU–PF	
Charles Tawengwa	1993	1995	ZANU–PF	
Solomon Tawengwa	1995	March 1999	ZANU–PF	
Vacant; city administered by government-appointed commission 1999–2002				
Elias Mudzuri	1 April 2002	April 2003	MDC	
Sekesai Makwavarara (acting)	April 2003	2008	MDC	
Sekesai Makwavarara (acting)	April 2003	2008	ZANU–PF	
Emmanuel Chiroto	15 June 2008	June 2008	MDC–T	
Muchadeyi Masunda	2 July 2008	18 December 2013	Independent	
Bernard Manyenyeni	18 December 2013	13 February 2018	MDC–T	
Enock Mupamawonde (acting)	13 February 2018	3 September 2018	MDC–T	
Herbert Gomba (Note: Recalled from City Council amid factional disputes within the MDC Alliance.)	3 September 2018	14 August 2020	MDC Alliance	
Jacob Mafume (Note: Mafume was suspended from office four times by local government minister July Moyo. During his suspensions, Stewart Mutizwa served as acting mayor.)	3 September 2020	September 2023	MDC Alliance	
Jacob Mafume	3 September 2020	September 2023	CCC	
Ian Makone	11 September 2023	9 November 2023	CCC	
Lovejoy Chitengu	21 November 2023	21 December 2023	CCC	
Jacob Mafume	21 December 2023		CCC	

== See also ==
- Timeline of Harare
