= Learnmore Jongwe =

Zimbabwean politician

Learnmore "Judah" Jongwe (April 28, 1974 – October 24, 2002) was a Zimbabwean lawyer and politician who served as Member of the National Assembly of Zimbabwe for Kuwadzana, and spokesman for the Movement for Democratic Change. In August 2002 he was charged with the murder of his wife, Rutendo Muusha, after he had surrendered to the police, he was then put in custody awaiting trial before he died soon after.

== Personal life ==
It is alleged he murdered his wife after finding her having intercourse with another man in July 2002, and in August 2002 he was charged with the murder of his wife after he had surrendered to the police in Chipinge, who then referred him to Murehwa. He enrolled in the University of Zimbabwe where he met his wife around the 1990s. He and his wife had one child together.

== Death ==
Whilst awaiting trial on October 24, 2002 he died at the age of 28, the cause of his death is unknown.
