= Munyaradzi Gwisai =

Zimbabwean politician (born 1968)

General Coordinator of the International Socialist Organization in Zimbabwe

Member of the Zimbabwe Parliament for Highfield, Harare
- In office 2000–2002

Personal details
- Born: 8 February 1968 (age 58) Gweru
- Party: International Socialist Organization
- Other political affiliations: Movement for Democratic Change
- Children: Sankara Bloemen Gwisai, Rosa Choto Gwisai
- Occupation: Lawyer

Munyaradzi Gwisai is a Zimbabwean politician and general coordinator of the International Socialist Organization in Zimbabwe. He was a member of the parliament on a ticket of the Movement for Democratic Change from 2000 until he was expelled from the MDC in 2002 and lost the subsequent by-election.

== Personal life ==
Munya currently lives in Harare, Zimbabwe. He teaches at the university of Zimbabwe, and also is partner at Matika, Gwisai and Partners in Harare and represents people all over the country. He has two children named Rosa and Sankara.

In February 2011, Gwisai and 45 others were arrested after watching video footage of the Arab Spring at a public meeting and were charged with treason, which carries the death penalty in Zimbabwe. Gwisai's wife, Shantha Bloemen, claims "the strategy of the regime at the moment is to stall it for as long as possible for propaganda value, to instill fear in people." The move has been condemned by Human Rights Watch and Amnesty International. Gwisai was released with a fine in 2012.
