= Glen Norah, Harare =

Coordinates: 17°54′S 30°58′E

Glen Norah is a high-density, working class suburb in southwest Harare, Zimbabwe.

== Features ==
The suburb borders with Glen View and Highfield mostly high density surbubs . Highfield is regarded to be where the fight for the liberation struggle began. Glen Norah is divided into three sections A, B and C, with A bordering with Glen View. Glen Norah C is along the High Glen Road towards Chitungwiza/Beatrice Road and also borders Highfield. Glen Norah B is in the middle of A and C.

Glen Norah has been the home of notable Zimbabweans including Stunner, Addington Dzingirai, Alexio Kawara, and Priscilla Misihairabwi-Mushonga. It has been home to the deceased footballer George Shaya [Dynamos and Zimbabwe international], former Kaizer Chiefs soccer star Tinashe Nengomasha, and artists Simon Choper Chimbetu and Sulumani Chimbetu (Sungura).

Glen Norah is home to seven primary schools: Ruvheneko, Infill, Kudakwashe, Zuvarabuda, Shiriyedenga, Chembira, Glen Norah Seven, and Glen Norah Nine, all which offer kindergarten through grade seven. There are two public secondary schools in Glen Norah, with only Glen Norah One offering A-levels. St. Peter's Kubatana is also in Rockview which is a Glen Norah middle class density area, a work of the Jesuits which goes back to 1963 and includes a technical school.

== History ==
Nearby, Glen View and Glen Norah both used to be a farm owned by a farmer known as Mr. Baxter. Glen Norah got its name from Norah, who was Baxter’s wife. ‘Glen’ is Scottish Gaelic for a narrow valley. Used in conjunction, it became Norah’s valley while Glen View, on higher ground, gave the view of the valley.

High Glen Road was part of the farm stretching down to the Mukuvisi River. The early inhabitants used to call the place KwaBhakasta. The farmhouse is at present-day St Peter's Kubatana school. The eucalyptus trees that now dominate the area were first planted during the area's farming days and today are colloquially known as Mapuranga, the place of wood. The park in Glen Norah was formerly a dam on the farm that until the mid-1960s when the farm was drained and developed into a residential area. Prior to that, people used to purchase cheap pork hides and bones from Baxter Farm on the city's outskirts.

== See also ==
- Harare
- Epworth
- Mbare
- Glen View
