= Glen View, Harare =

Glen View
- Suburb
- Nickname: Geevaz
- Country: Zimbabwe
- City: Harare

Government
  - Type: Municipality Council
  - Body: District Council
- Elevation: 1,382 m (4,534 ft)
- Time zone: UTC+2:00 (CAT)
- Area code: 4

Glen View is a high-density suburb that lies on the border of Harare Province and Mashonaland West. It split between the two provinces, with the larger part on Harare’s side and the remainder (a small portion of Glen View 2) on Mashonaland West side under their governance of Zvimba Rural District. It is believed to have 160,000(6.4% of Harare’s population) people although the Zimstat (a statistical body in Zimbabwe) says it has on 45,000 people. It shares boundaries with Budiriro on the North (4.341km), Glen Norah on the East(4.0km), South and West being Mashonaland West. It is divided into 8 parts namely Glen View 1, 2, 3, 4, 7, 8, 1 Extension and Riverside. It has around 15000 residential stands which ranges from 200sqm to 500sqm with most of them averaging 10 people per house.

It has 6 shopping centers. It also has 12 public schools, 3 secondary education schools and the rest being primary schools.

== History ==
Glen View residents were allocated residential stands by the Abel Muzorewa regime in 1979. Abel Muzorewa was the Prime Minister of Zimbabwe Rhodesia. The community was established under a rent to buy housing scheme where home owners would receive their title deeds after twenty-five years.

== Governance ==
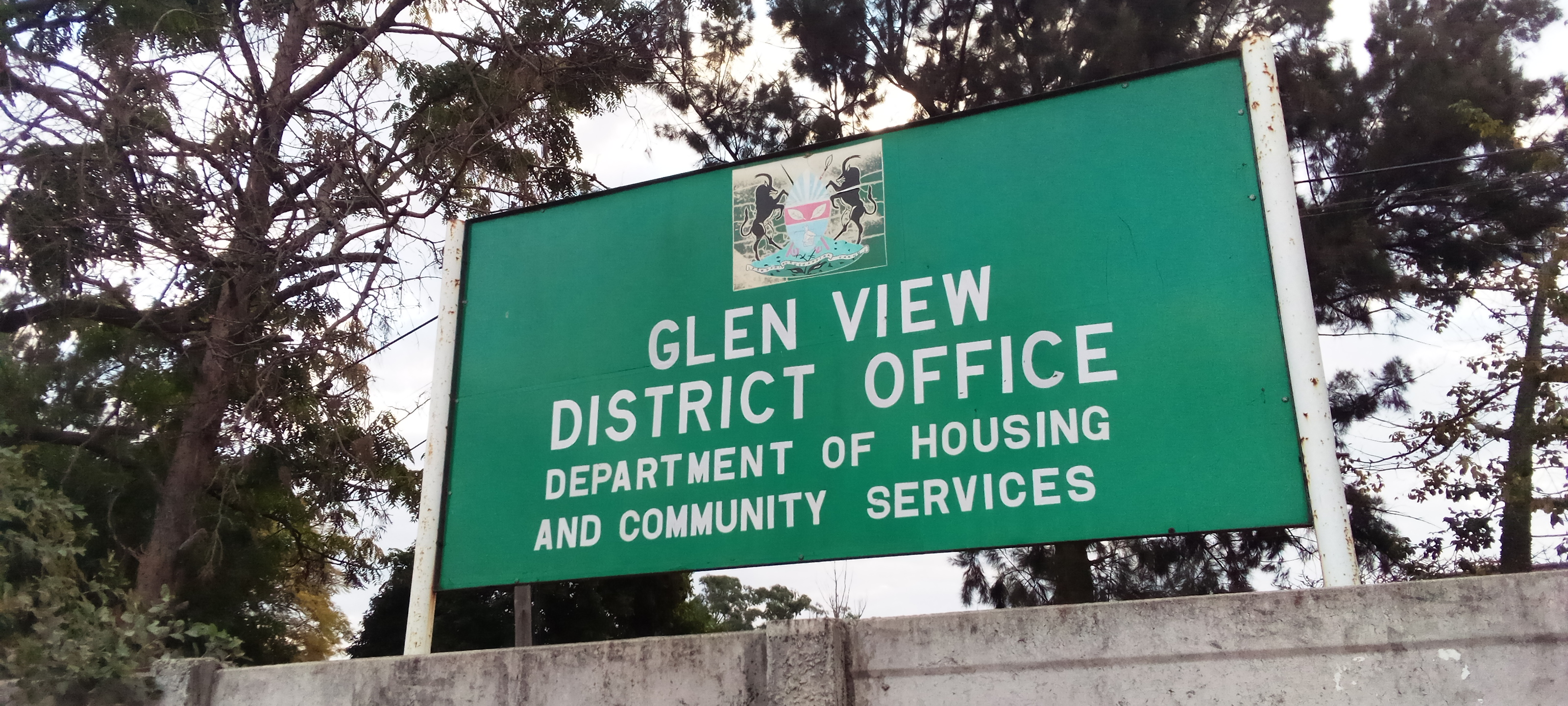
Glen View District Office

=== Current councillors ===
Ward	Area	Councillor	Party
30	Glen View	Charles Chidhagu	Citizens Coalition For Change
31	Glen View	Joshua Pedzisai	Citizens Coalition For Change
32	Glen View	Gaudencia Marera	Citizens Coalition For Change

=== Current Members of Parliament ===
Constituency	Area	Member of Parliament	Party
Glen View North	Glen View	Fani Munengami	Citizens Coalition For Change
Glen View South	Glen View	Grandmore Hakata	Citizens Coalition for Change

== Geography ==
Glen View borders with other townships like Glen Norah and Budiriro. It is divided into sections 1, 2, 3, 4, 7, Area 8 and earlier extensions.

=== Location ===
It is located in the South-Western parts of Zimbabwe's Capital City, at a distance of 14 km from Harare's Central Business District to the North-East in the wetlands plateau of Manyame River catchment area.

=== Wetlands ===
Glen View is slowly encroaching towards wetlands due to bad governance by local authorities and land barons. Manyame Conservation Trust oversees wetland management in Glen View territory.

== Demographics ==
One of the most populous agglomeration in Zimbabwe.

=== Population density ===
Land disputes are to be expected in one of the most populous suburbs in Harare. One incident resulted in a shooting.

== Education ==
There is a number of public and private institutions operating in the area, from kindergartens to primary and secondary schools. Zimbabwe's Ministry of Primary and Secondary Education governs up to ten schools.

The Government and Council provide both Primary education, Secondary education and Early child development in Glen View, as well as other Private schools.

=== Schools ===
School	Suburb or Town	Years	Sex	Type	Founded	Website
Glen View 1 Primary School	Glen View		Co-ed	Government
Glen View 2 Primary School	Glen View		Co-ed	Government
Glen View 3 Primary School	Glen View		Co-ed	Government
Glen View 4 Primary School	Glen View		Co-ed	Government
Glen View 5 Primary School	Glen View	39	Co-ed	Government	1984
Glen View 6 Primary School	Glen View		Co-ed	Council
Glen View 7 Primary School	Glen View		Co-ed	Council
Glen View 8 Primary School	Glen View		Co-ed	Council
Glen View 9 Primary School	Glen View		Co-ed	Council
Glen View No. 1 High	Glen View		Co-ed	Government
Glen View No. 2 High	Glen View		Co-ed	Government
Glen View No. 3 High	Glen View		Co-ed	Government
Herentals	Glen View		Co-ed	Private
El Roi	Glen View		Co-ed	Private
Royal College	Glen View		Co-ed	Private
Malta Academy	Glen View		Co-ed	Private

== Economics ==
Glen View's informal sectors play the larger part of investment in the community though the unforeseen hinders progress.

ZESA Harare Southern Region Headquarters is located in Glen View 1.

== Public safety ==
Zimbabwe Republic Police is the only visible safety providing entity within Glen View. In the 2000s and 2010s there was a wave of politically induced violence in Glen View. Among other incidents, in 2011 the police went in to break-up an opposition party (MDC-T) rally, resulting in a riot, and the death of a policeman.

== Public health ==
The City Council of Harare puts its efforts in maintaining the health of the population by it providing clinics, waterworks and the collection of refuse.

Frequent water crisis hit this area sparking disease outbreaks

Home industries established in the area have posed a threat to the environment despite efforts by the council.

In a report, Zimbabwe's Environmental Management Agency, (EMA) said Harare council had neglected Glen View.

=== List of hospitals and medical centers in Glen View ===
Here is a list of hospitals and medical centers in Glen View:

== Community centers ==
Glen View has community halls in areas 1 and 3. They are commercially open to the public by renting out for social activity such as religious gatherings and others. The centers are local-government-owned and at times used for public information and information gathering. Government schools have provided facilities for larger gatherings like elections due to their security and space.

== Culture and contemporary life ==
=== Recreation ===
A number of locations have become popular go to places for a residents.

- Guruwuswa Cultural Arts Village - Ancient Mbare site.
- Freedom junction

== Notable people ==
These figures either reside in or originate from Glen View.

== Local Sports Clubs and Academies ==
- Starlight Sports Academy (Glen View 1 Primary)
- Maningi Queens
- Light Fc
- Glen View Community Football Academy (GV 9, pry)
- Weerams (GV 4 Primary)
- Stylezone ( GV3 Secondary)

== See also ==
- Harare
- Mbare
- Highfield
- Glen Norah
