= Acie Lumumba =

Zimbabwean politician (born 1988)

- Born: September 29, 1988 (age 37); Epworth, Zimbabwe
- Occupation: Political Commentator
- Years active: 2013-present
- Known for: Politics of Zimbabwe

Lumumba William Gerald Mutumanje (born 29 September 1988), known as Acie Lumumba, is a Zimbabwean politician. He made accusations of corruption and misconduct against leading Zimbabwean politicians and institutions. He was briefly head of communications for the Ministry of Finance and Economic Development in October 2018, and was subsequently himself charged with corruption.

== Career ==
Lumumba is a Zanu-PF activist who was appointed by Zimbabwe’s Minister of Finance and Economic development Mthuli Ncube to head the ministry’s communications task force. He was fired three days after his appointment, after he accused the Reserve Bank of Zimbabwe (RBOZ) of supplying the Black market with Zimbabwean bond notes. Zimbabwe's Minister of Energy and Power Development, Jorum Gumbo dismissed claims made by Lumumba that a cartel controlled the country's fuel industry. In 2013, Lumumba ran for parliament in a bid to represent the Hatfield Constituency under Zanu-PF. He lost to Tapiwa Mashakada of the Movement for Democratic Change – Tsvangirai (MDC-T) the Minister of Investment Promotion and Economic Planning. In 2016, Lumumba publicly accused Zimbabwe's Indigenisation Minister Patrick Zhuwao of corruption and extortion over Old Mutual shares after Zhuwao had fired him. In October 2018, Lumumba exposed senior executives at RBOZ including businessman Kudakwashe Tagwirei for alleged corruption and illegal foreign exchange market trading.

=== Arrests ===
In 2016, Lumumba insulted former Zimbabwean president Robert Mugabe during a televised speech and was arrested until he was released on USD $400 bail. In November 2018, Lumumba was arrested by the Zimbabwe Anti-Corruption Commission (ZACC) over corruption charges.

== Personal life ==
Lumumba was born in 1988, to a domestic worker in Epworth, Harare, and lived abroad for a number of years. In 2016, Lumumba made headlines when a sex tape in which he appeared was leaked on social media.
