= Swithun Mombeshora =

Minister in the Government of Zimbabwe (1945–2003)

Doctor Swithun Mombeshora

Minister in the Government of Zimbabwe
- In office July 2000 – 2003
- President: Robert Mugabe

Personal details
- Party: Zimbabwe African National Union-Patriotic Front

Dr. Swithun Mombeshora (August 20, 1945 – 19 March 2003) was a former Minister of Transport and Communications and Higher and Tertiary Education in Zimbabwe.

Shortly before his death in 2003, he was placed on the United States sanctions list.
