= Muchadeyi Masunda =

Zimbabwean politician (born 1952)

Mayor of Harare
- In office 2 July 2008 – 2013
- Preceded by: Emmanuel Chiroto
- Succeeded by: Bernard Manyenyeni

Personal details
- Born: 1952 (age 73–74) Bulawayo, Southern Rhodesia
- Children: Sindisiwe van Zyl

Muchadeyi Masunda is a Zimbabwean businessman and politician. He was the mayor of Harare, the capital city of Zimbabwe, elected in 2008.

As chairman of 12 companies and director of two, he is also well known in Zimbabwean cricket, golf and tennis. He is a member of the Court of Arbitration for Sport, based in Switzerland.

== Early life and education ==
Masunda was born in Bulawayo, Southern Rhodesia in 1952. His father, a Manicaland native, settled in Bulawayo in 1915 and was one of the city's first Shona residents, but became "Ndebele by osmosis." He was raised Christian. His godfather was Dr Edmund Hugh Ashton, the white director of the city's housing and community services department.

== Election ==
A prominent businessman and lawyer, Masunda was elected unanimously by the Harare council on 2 July 2008 for a five-year term after Emmanuel Chiroto, an MDC member who was previously elected executive mayor by the MDC-majority council on 15 June, voluntarily stood down from the mayoralty and accepted the position of deputy mayor, after allegations that his wife was captured and tortured by Zanu-PF youth. Masunda is the first non-MDC member to take office as mayor since before the election of Elias Mudzuri in 2002, and chooses not to be associated with any political party.

== Associated Newspapers of Zimbabwe ==
Masunda was chief executive officer for Associated Newspapers of Zimbabwe (ANZ), the parent company of The Daily News, which was controversially banned by the government even after the court ruled that the newspaper should be allowed to resume operations. Critics, such as Masunda himself, claim that this is a clear attack on press freedom in Zimbabwe although the government claims that ANZ broke Zimbabwean investment laws, as claimed by The Herald from information supplied by the Zimbabwe Investment Center (ZIC). Masunda claimed that: "The police are simply trying to build up a fraud case on the basis of false information supplied by the ZIC and reports published in The Herald."

== Non-executive mayor ==
Masunda's role as the first non-executive mayor, since the recent abolition of the executive mayor by the Zimbabwe Urban Councils Act prevents him from taking part in the running of the council. Instead he will be chairing all full council meetings, as well as civic functions. The new mayor will also no longer occupy Harare's mayoral mansion, and will conduct from an office in Town House. This is one of many reforms agreed to by Zanu-PF and the two Movement for Democratic Change factions (MDC-T and MDC-M) after the Southern African Development Community negotiations, offering a more ceremonial mayor. The current mayoral system involves the elected council choosing the mayor, rather than a direct mayoral election. He supports the return of the ceremonial mayor, stating that: "you cannot have two bulls – and executive mayor and a town clerk." He also claims that this is one of the failings of European and American governments, which he claims is an "unmitigated disaster".

== Policies ==
Masunda has no political experience in any party, and therefore does not openly support the ruling Zanu-PF or either MDC faction, although reportedly being encouraged to stand by Morgan Tsvangirai of the main MDC faction. He believes that both parties should ignore their different political stances to improve Harare, and restore its status as the "sunshine city" and is willing to hold talks with both parties. Masunda claims he does not wish to be connected to any political party, as it would give a bad impression of him as a lawyer, who defends people regardless of race or political orientation.

Masunda has stated that he will use his business connections to improve the service delivery of the city, such as water provision, roads, grass cutting, traffic and streetlights, and refuse collection. He has also divided the city's issues "soft" issues such as the repairing of pavements and cleaning of house fronts, concerning the owners of houses and their tenants, as well as the more important issues of water, traffic, and streetlights.

He plans to transfer the management of water from the company Zinwa back to the council, by engaging in talks with Zinwa and the government. He claims this is a necessity because the company had not been fulfilling its mandate to supply water to Harare.

== See also ==
- Timeline of Harare
