= Liberalism in Zimbabwe =

This article gives an overview of liberal parties in Zimbabwe. It is limited to liberal parties with substantial support, mainly proved by having had a representation in parliament. The sign ⇒ means a reference to another party in that scheme. For inclusion in this scheme it isn't necessary so that parties labeled themselves as a liberal party.

== Introduction ==
The first political party in Southern Rhodesia to name designate itself as "liberal" was the Southern Rhodesia Liberal Party, founded by Jacob Smit as an opposition party against the then-dominant United Federal Party; however, besides its promotion of economic liberalism, it continued to support the white minority rule in the colony. It eventually lost representation in parliament and merged with what eventually became the conservative Rhodesian Front.

During the bush War of the 1960s and 1970s, the only centrist party that pushed for majority rule and integration of the black African majority while not veering toward militant opposition was the United African National Council, led by (Zimbabwe Rhodesia) Prime Minister Rev. Abel Muzorewa; James Chikerema, a militant leader of FROLIZI, merged his party with Muzorewa's ANC coalition, and would later become the first vice-president of Muzorewa's UANC. The reformist prime minister of Southern Rhodesia, Garfield Todd, also advocated against the Ian Smith government, for which he was detained (he also advocated against the Mugabe government, which stripped him of citizenship shortly before his death in 2002).

When black majority rule began in 1980, parliament was dominated by the ZANU-PF, a Marxist party with illiberal tendencies, with the former Rhodesian Front (renamed the Republican Front and, finally, the Conservative Alliance of Zimbabwe) representing the seats allocated to the white minority until the seats were abolished in 1987. In 1992, the CAZ met with members of other opposition parties, including the UANC and ZANU-Ndonga to form a united opposition to ZANU-PF; what resulted was the Forum Party of former Chief Justice Enoch Dumbutshena, which, while not gaining any seats by the time it fizzled out, was the first post-independence multiracial opposition party.

Non-conservative whites who had previously been forced to vote for either the nationalist socialist majority or conservative minority parties since independence for convenience purposes, in the meantime, backed non-political, multiracial civil society groups that had pressed against the land reforms and other policies pushed by ZANU-PF. These groups, galvanized by the 2000 referendum, soon organized into a political party, the Movement for Democratic Change. Led by Morgan Tsvangirai with a short-lived faction led by Arthur Mutambara, the MDC, which presses for social and political liberalism and is backed by the Zimbabwe Congress of Trade Unions and the Open Society Initiative for Southern Africa, soon usurped the opposition position in Parliament against the ZANU-PF. By 2008, it had achieved the majority in both houses of parliament.

Liberals in Zimbabwe have experienced persecution from the government during Mugabe's reign.

== People ==
- Garfield Todd

== See also ==
- History of Zimbabwe
- Politics of Zimbabwe
- List of political parties in Zimbabwe
