= Masvingo South =

- Constituency for the National Assembly of Zimbabwe
- Province: Masvingo
- Region: Masvingo District

Current constituency
- Created: 1985
- Seats: 1
- Party: ZANU–PF
- Member(s): Tanatsiwa Mukomberi

Masvingo South is a constituency represented in the National Assembly of the Parliament of Zimbabwe, located in Masvingo District in Masvingo Province. Created for the 1985 election, its inaugural member, Eddison Zvobgo of ZANU–PF, held the seat for 19 years until his death in 2004. The current MP since the 2023 election is Tanatsiwa Mukomberi of ZANU–PF.

== History ==
Eddison Zvobgo, one of the ZANU–PF founders, was the Member of Parliament (MP) for Masvingo South from its creation in 1985 until his death in 2004. In a by-election held on 11 October 2004, the ZANU–PF candidate Walter Mzembi was elected unopposed after the opposition Movement for Democratic Change did not put forth a candidate. Mzembi was reelected in the 2005, 2008, and 2013 elections. In 2018, ZANU–PF's Claudious Maronge was elected to represent Masvingo South.

== Members ==
Election	Member	Party
1985	Eddison Zvobgo	ZANU–PF
1990	Eddison Zvobgo	ZANU–PF
1995	Eddison Zvobgo	ZANU–PF
2000	Eddison Zvobgo	ZANU–PF
2004 by-election	Walter Mzembi	ZANU–PF
2005	Walter Mzembi	ZANU–PF
2008	Walter Mzembi	ZANU–PF
2013	Walter Mzembi	ZANU–PF
2018	Claudious Maronge	ZANU–PF
2023	Tanatsiwa Mukomberi	ZANU–PF

== See also ==
- List of Zimbabwean parliamentary constituencies
