= Wilson Khumbula =

Zimbabwean politician

Wilson Tarugarira Khumbula

Member of the Zimbabwe House of Assembly for Chipinge North
- In office 1995 – 2000
- Preceded by: Gordon Mushakavanhu
- Succeeded by: Messias Matewu

Member of the Zimbabwe House of Assembly for Chipinge South
- In office 2000 – 2005
- Preceded by: Ndabaningi Sithole
- Succeeded by: Enock Porusingazi

Personal details
- Born: October 12, 1937 (age 88) Manicaland Province, Zimbabwe
- Party: ZANU-PF (2015—present); ZANU Ndonga (1960s—2015)
- Profession: Politician, businessman

Wilson Khumbula, also known as Kujokochera, is a Zimbabwean politician and businessman. He is a former leader of the Zimbabwe African National Union - Ndonga (ZANU-Ndonga), and arguably dissolved the faction in 2015, 2018, and 2021 to join ZANU-PF. He was one of the early members of ZANU-Ndonga, which formed in 1963 under Ndabaningi Sithole.

== Early life ==
Khumbula is from Checheche Growth Point in the Chipinge South area of Manicaland, Zimbabwe.

== Military service ==
During the Rhodesian Bush War, Khumbula worked with Maurice Nyagumbo to recruit soldiers to fight for liberation. He was arrested in 1975 and was sentenced to ten years at Harare Central Prison before being released in 1978 due to the signing of the Internal Settlement. He was arrested again later that year and sentenced to six years at Chikurubi Prison until the Lancaster House Agreement in 1979. At some point, he was also tortured and incarcerated at Hwahwa Prison in Gweru. After the war, he remained active in ZANU-Ndonga alongside party leader Ndabaningi Sithole.

== Career ==
In the 1995 Zimbabwean parliamentary election, Khumbula was elected as the Zimbabwe House of Assembly representative for Chipinge North alongside Ndonga leader Ndabaningi Sithole, who represented Chipinge South. Ndonga was the only opposition party represented in the 1995 parliament. Khumbula won the only House seat for Ndonga in the 2000 parliamentary election and subsequently ran for president in 2002, where he received less than 1% of the vote. Khumbula lost his House seat in 2005 and his bid in the 2013 election. In 2018, he sought to represent Chipinge South as a member of ZANU-PF, but lost to Enock Porusingazi.

He supported ZANU–PF presidential candidate Simba Makoni in the 2008 Zimbabwean general election.

Khumbula took over as president of ZANU-Ndonga following the death of Sithole in 2000. In 2018, Denford Musiyariri claimed that Khumbula had been expelled from the party in 2005 and replaced with Rev. Dr. Fred J. Gomendo. He was later reinstated and served as president until 2015, when he left to join ZANU-PF and Musiyariri himself took over as president. Musiyariri joined the MDC Alliance ahead of the 2018 election to oppose ZANU-PF. As of 2021, Khumbula and Musiyariri are each referred to as the ZANU-Ndonga president across different sources.

Despite repeated assertions that he is not interested in joining a coalition, Khumbula has joined, un-joined, and rejoined ZANU-PF over the years, often declaring the move on behalf of the party; in 2015 and 2018, Khumbula called upon ZANU-Ndonga members to identify as and vote for ZANU-PF in the 2018 Zimbabwean general election. Critics of Khumbula, particularly those within ZANU-Ndonga, have accused him of joining ZANU-PF for his own gain. In April 2021, Khumbula and representatives from NPF, MDC-A, and MDC agreed to dissolve their political parties to join the ZANU-PF ahead of the 2023 Zimbabwean presidential election. ZANU-PF leader Patrick Chinamasa praised Khumbula for this action and said it helped unite the people of Chipinge.

== Other trades ==
Khumbula owns Zineku Beerhall, which rivals another establishment owned by ZANU-PF MP Enock Porusingazi, in Checheche. He uses the beerhall as a gathering place for ZANU-Ndonga supporters and strongly emphasizes the importance of Muchongoyo in bringing party members together. He also owns or has owned a restaurant, two gas stations, Kujo Superstar Hotel and Casino, a night club, grinding mills, and a construction company focused on developing housing and shopping in rural Checheche. He has a major financial hand in the Division Two football team the Zineku Stars. Khumbula received the Zimbabwe National Chamber of Commerce Lifetime Achievement Award in 2015 for his work as a businessman in rural Checheche.

== Personal life ==
One of his children, Kudakwashe Khumbula, is a politician representing the Zimbabwe Partnership for Prosperity. His nephew is Enock Porusingazi, the ZANU-PF-aligned politician who defeated Khumbula twice for House seats.
