= Nyasha Chikwinya =

Zimbabwean politician

Minister of Women Affairs, Gender and Development
- In office 6 July 2015 – 2017
- Preceded by: Oppah Muchinguri
- Succeeded by: Sithembiso Nyoni

Personal details
- Party: ZANU-PF

Nyasha Chikwinya is a Zimbabwean politician with the ruling Zimbabwe African National Union – Patriotic Front.

== Career ==
She was elected to the House of Assembly in 1995, representing the Harare North constituency, but lost her seat in the 2000 elections, coming in second with just 4,852 votes, compared to 18,976 for Trudy Stevenson of the Movement for Democratic Change. Her attempt in the 2005 elections to regain her seat representing the Harare North constituency was a failure, garnering only 5,134 votes to 11,262 for incumbent Stevenson. However, as of 2005, she remained head of Zanu-PF's women's league.

In the 2013 general elections she became the Member of Parliament for Mutare South in Manicaland. In the aftermath of the election she made allegations of sexual harassment, violence, and discrimination against women during the primaries. In July 2015 she was appointed Minister of Women Affairs, Gender and Development as part of a cabinet reshuffle.

== Other activities ==
In 2002, she led the only all-women's delegation to the All Africa Trade Fair in Cairo, Egypt, during which stone carvers, stone sculptors, weavers, and producers of batik fabrics brought product samples from Zimbabwe. She expressed enthusiasm for intra-African trade, but bemoaned the high duties imposed by Egyptian customs. In 2004, she was charged with public violence after allegedly having incited 12 youths to assault Charles Mpofu, a member of the Zimbabwe National Army, with whom she was having a dispute over the management of a housing co-operative; the youths assaulted Mpofu's wife and damaged $5.1 million of property.
