= First Shadow Cabinet of Morgan Tsvangirai =

Zimbabwean Shadow Cabinet

First Shadow Cabinet of Morgan Tsvangirai represents the shadow cabinet associated with Zimbabwean politician Morgan Tsvangirai. As the leader of the opposition in the authoritarian state of Zimbabwe, which was ruled by Robert Mugabe at the time, Tsvangirai established a "cabinet" in parallel to that of the government. Tsvangirai entered into a power-sharing agreement with the Mugabe regime in 2009.

== List and changes ==
=== 2000 establishment ===
The original shadow cabinet was established after MDC had gained the largest number of non-majority seats in parliament in that year's election.

- Giles Mutsekwa, Defence
- Welshman Ncube, Home Affairs
- Tendai Biti, Foreign Affairs
- David Coltart, Justice
- Tapiwa Mashakada, Finance and Economic Planning
- Fidelis Mhashu, Education
- Evylin Masaiti, Gender, Youth and Culture
- Hilda Suka Mafudze, Environment and Tourism
- Renson Gasela, Lands and Agriculture

=== 2008 reshuffle ===
- David Coltart, Legal and Constitutional Affairs
- Blessing Chebundo, Health and Child Welfare
- Giles Mutsekwa, Security and Defence
- Fidelis Mhashu, Education
- Priscilla Misihairabwi, Foreign Affairs
- Gabriel Chibva, Local Government
- Renson Gasela, Lands, Agriculture and Natural Affairs
- Evelyn Masaiti, Gender, Youth and Culture
- Murisi Zvizvayi, Energy, Transport and Communications
- Paurina Mpariwa, Public Service, Labour and Social Security
- Joel Gabuza, Mines
- Tapiwa Mashakada, Budget, Finance and Economic Planning
- Tendai Biti, Home Affairs
- Paul Themba Nyathi, Information (non-MP)
- Edwin Mushoriwa, Environment and Tourism
- Milford Gwetu, Industry and Commerce

=== 2009 reshuffle ===
A reshuffle occurred on November 12, 2009.

- David Coltart, Legal and Constitutional Affairs
- Blessing Chebundo, Health and Child Welfare
- Giles Mutsekwa, Security and Defence
- Fidelis Mhashu, Education
- Trudy Stevenson, Local Government
- Moses Mzila Ndlovu, Foreign Affairs
- Murisi Zvizvayi, Energy, Transport and Communications
- Paurina Mpariwa, Public Service, Labour and Social Security
- Joel Gabuza, Mines
- Editor Matamisa, Gender, Youth and Culture
- Edward Mukosi, Lands, Agriculture and Natural Affairs
- Tapiwa Mashakada, Budget, Finance and Economic Planning
- Tendai Biti, Home Affairs
- Paul Themba Nyathi, Information (non-MP)
- Edwin Mushoriwa, Environment and Tourism
- Milford Gwetu, Industry and Commerce
