= Border Gezi =

Zimbabwean politician

The Honourable Border Kuzhaka Gezi MP

Minister of Youth Development, Gender and Employment
- In office 18 April 2000 – 28 April 2001
- President: Robert Mugabe

Resident Minister and Governor for Mashonaland Central
- In office 1996–2000
- President: Robert Mugabe

Personal details
- Born: 17 December 1964 Guruve, Rhodesia and Nyasaland
- Died: 28 April 2001 (aged 36) Mvuma-Masvingo Highway
- Party: Zimbabwe African National Union-Patriotic Front
- Spouse: Tsitsi Gezi
- Children: Vernon Kuzhaka; Rutherford Kuzhaka
- Nickname: Madzibaba

Military service
- Allegiance: Zimbabwe African National Liberation Army
- Years of service: 1977–1980
- Rank: Mujibha

Border Gezi (17 December 1964 – 28 April 2001) was a Zimbabwean politician. He was a close ally of Robert Mugabe within ZANU-PF and served as Minister for Gender, Youth and Employment from 2000 having previously been a provincial governor.

Gezi was brought up in Mvurwi and attended Holy Rosary Secondary School. He first worked as an accounts clerk for the Zimbabwe Electricity Supply Authority before being elected to the House of Assembly of Zimbabwe for Muzarabani in the 1990 elections. In 1993 he was elected as ZANU-PF chairman for Mashonaland Central, and the government appointed him Provincial Governor from 1996.

At the 2000 parliamentary election, Gezi was in charge of recruiting and organising groups of young ZANU-PF supporters into a militia. The militia groups he led were implicated in violent attacks on supporters of the Movement for Democratic Change, and in invasions of white-owned farms. At a special ZANU-PF congress later that year, Gezi was appointed Secretary for the Commissariat, with responsibility for organizing Robert Mugabe's re-election as President two years later.

Gezi won the Bindura seat at the 2000 election and was appointed as Minister for Gender, Youth and Employment. He was identified as a close ally of Robert Mugabe who had the potential to hold high office in the future. However, he was killed when his Mercedes-Benz E-Class W210 skidded off the Harare-Masvingo road after bursting a tyre and crashed into numerous Eucalyptus trees on 28 April 2001.
