= 2000 Zimbabwean constitutional referendum =

- 12–13 February 2000

Results
Choice	Votes	%
Yes	578,210	45.32%
No	697,754	54.68%
Valid votes	1,275,964	97.20%
Invalid or blank votes	36,774	2.80%
Total votes	1,312,738	100.00%

A constitutional referendum was held in Zimbabwe on 12–13 February 2000. The proposed new constitution, which had been drafted by a Constitutional Convention the previous year, was rejected by voters. The rejection was unexpected and was taken as a personal rebuff for President Robert Mugabe and a political triumph for the newly formed opposition group, the Movement for Democratic Change. The new proposed constitution was notable for giving power to the government to seize farms owned by white farmers, without compensation, and transfer them to black farm owners as part of a scheme of land reform.

The referendum was characterized by political violence.

== Background ==
The constitution of Zimbabwe had been drawn up as part of the Lancaster House Agreement of 1979 and had served the country for nearly 20 years. There was a widespread feeling in Zimbabwe that it was too heavily influenced by the country's colonial past, and that a new constitution written in the light of the experience of independence was desirable. Accordingly, on 21 May 1999, President Mugabe announced the convening of a Constitutional Convention to draft such a constitution fit for the country. The chairman of the commission was a senior judge, Godfrey Chidyausiku. 396 people were named to the convention, including all 150 members of the House of Assembly; some previous opponents of the government were included among the 246 other members, such as Professor Jonathan Moyo.

Over August and September the Convention held more than 5,000 meetings with local people and groups in Zimbabwe, with many seeing concerns voiced over granting of more powers to the executive Presidency. There had already arisen a community group called the National Constitutional Assembly (formed 1997) which convened a "People's Constitutional Convention" in Chitungwiza in June 1999. 4,000 attended this gathering. The perceived success of this group was a critical part in the decision to form the Movement for Democratic Change.

At the convention's final meeting on 29 November, Justice Chidyausiku announced that the proposed constitution had been adopted "by acclamation" and did not call for a vote. There was some dissent within the room, with dissenters arguing that the proposed constitution did not represent the opinions of Zimbabweans on issues such as presidential powers. Opponents argued that the Executive Presidency should be replaced with a Prime Minister accountable to Parliament, and a titular and not executive President.

== Constitutional proposals ==
The proposed constitution incorporated a "Bill of Rights" based on that adopted in South Africa but with some rights restricted (for example, it included no pledge to equal treatment for homosexuals). It proposed to expand the House of Assembly to 200 members, with 50 of them to be elected under a proportional voting system, and to create a new 60 member Senate. It proposed to limit the President to two successive five-year terms, a restriction to begin after the constitution came in force.

The executive President was to remain but be supplemented by a Prime Minister who would be head of government on a day-to-day basis. Opponents of the constitution criticised the legal immunities given to the State and to individuals holding office.

One of the more controversial aspects of the constitution covered land reform. The draft presented by the commission was not that presented to the electorate for the referendum, but a revised version redrafted by the Cabinet. The proposed Bill of Rights declared that "before Independence the people of Zimbabwe were unjustifiably dispossessed of their land and other resources without compensation", and therefore included a clause allowing the Government to take possession of white-owned land with compensation to be paid by the United Kingdom. Should the United Kingdom not pay, the constitution declared that the "Government of Zimbabwe has no obligation to pay compensation".

== Administration ==
Referendums in Zimbabwe are counted by House of Assembly constituency. The Delimitation Commission determining the boundaries of constituencies had not yet reported in time for the 2000 elections and so the constituencies used were those drawn up by the 1994 Delimitation Commission. For details of their boundaries, see 1994 Delimitation Commission Report (Cmd. RZ 2 1995).

The voters' roll was reported to be in a poor state. A United Nations advisory team reported in December 1999 that up to a quarter of all the names were now dead, and a third of the names had since moved constituencies. The establishment of polling stations was delayed given the confusion, but the Registrar-General insisted on using the electoral roll rather than using other measures to prevent people from voting twice. A last-minute attempt to delay the referendum was turned down by the High Court.

== Result ==
Choice	Votes	%
For	578,210	45.32
Against	697,754	54.68
Total	1,275,964	100.00
Valid votes	1,275,964	97.20
Invalid/blank votes	36,774	2.80
Total votes	1,312,738	100.00
Source: African Elections Database

=== By constituency ===
Constituency	For		Against		Invalid/ blank
Constituency	Votes	%	Votes	%	Invalid/ blank
BULAWAYO PROVINCE
Bulawayo North	3,981	24.8	12,099	75.2	194
Bulawayo South	4,291	19.3	17,961	80.7	347
Lobengula	2,181	23.4	7,150	76.6	99
Luveve	2,022	22.8	6,860	77.2	398
Makokoba	2,433	24.1	7,680	75.9	182
Mpopoma	2,619	22.4	9,056	77.6	115
Nkulumane	4,807	26.1	13,619	73.9	214
Pelandaba	2,721	25.7	7,861	74.3	187
Pumula-Magwegwe	2,682	24.8	8,136	75.2	159
HARARE PROVINCE
Budiriro	3,467	21.2	12,908	78.8	240
Chitungwiza East	3,382	29.8	7,953	70.2	488
Chitungwiza West	3,683	29.1	8,993	70.9	413
Dzivarasekwa	4,574	29.3	11,016	70.7	228
Glen Norah	4,151	22.7	14,175	77.3	186
Glen View	2,894	20.9	10,920	79.1	115
Harare Central	4,821	22.2	16,882	77.8	191
Harare East	4,548	20.4	17,728	79.6	395
Harare North	4,942	24.7	15,038	75.3	394
Harare South	3,703	26.4	10,302	73.6	145
Hatfield	4,739	34.8	8,873	65.2	228
Highfield	3,940	25.6	11,429	74.4	158
Kambuzuma	2,907	22.3	10,121	77.7	154
Kuwadzana	3,977	28.5	9,997	71.5	124
Mbare East	3,787	28.1	9,693	71.9	187
Mbare West	3,022	24.3	9,405	75.7	307
Mufakose	4,680	26.1	13,252	73.9	244
St. Mary's	2,429	26.7	6,678	73.3	155
Tafara-Mabvuku	4,271	25.3	12,616	74.7	385
Zengeza	4,232	31.5	9,192	68.5	135
MANICALAND PROVINCE
Buhera North	4,018	53.5	3,494	46.5	142
Buhera South	4,609	55.3	3,721	44.7	167
Chimanimani	2,366	38.4	3,803	61.6	229
Chipinge North	1,828	26.4	5,104	73.6	190
Chipinge South	1,859	31.1	4,117	68.9	157
Makoni East	2,915	43.6	3,778	56.4	123
Makoni North	3,297	64.1	1,847	35.9	170
Makoni West	3,031	48.1	3,268	52.9	148
Mutare Central	3,126	18.4	13,821	81.6	165
Mutare North	3,121	22.8	10,594	77.2	854
Mutare South	2,452	37.3	4,120	62.7	133
Mutare West	1,771	43.0	2,347	57.0	109
Mutasa	1,867	35.5	3,389	64.5	114
Nyanga	2,733	38.4	4,384	61.6	197
MASHONALAND CENTRAL PROVINCE
Bindura	5,438	47.0	6,141	53.0	287
Guruve North	9,685	79.6	2,475	20.4	182
Guruve South	9,824	78.5	2,690	21.5	247
Mazoe East	8,119	61.2	5,147	38.8	253
Mazoe West	5,390	52.7	4,830	47.3	273
Mount Darwin	10,458	80.5	2,536	19.5	377
Muzarabani	7,758	77.8	2,216	22.2	246
Rushinga	11,593	78.7	3,146	21.3	559
Shamva	10,525	74.0	3,696	26.0	333
MASHONALAND EAST PROVINCE
Chikomba	4,201	57.3	3,127	42.7	807
Goromonzi	3,904	42.3	5,331	57.7	1,803
Marondera East	6,869	46.7	7,827	53.3	247
Marondera West	4,603	60.4	3,016	39.6	143
Mudzi	9,392	77.6	2,705	22.4	293
Murewa North	3,925	64.5	2,161	35.5	107
Murewa South	4,007	56.9	3,037	43.1	149
Mutoko North	5,041	69.2	2,245	30.8	172
Mutoko South	7,035	82.2	1,525	17.8	62
Seke	3,695	35.5	6,718	64.5	208
Uzumba-Maramba-Pfungwe	7,733	75.8	2,470	24.2	192
Wedza	4,552	62.1	2,784	37.9	195
MASHONALAND WEST PROVINCE
Chegutu East	4,167	44.1	5,276	55.9	264
Chegutu West	5,192	52.1	4,775	47.9	197
Chinhoyi	5,831	43.1	7,683	56.9	264
Hurungwe East	5,555	60.4	3,635	39.6	413
Hurungwe West	5,073	69.7	2,207	30.3	980
Kadoma Central	4,410	42.9	5,881	57.1	521
Kadoma East	4,673	73.5	1,688	26.5	123
Kadoma West	5,442	64.8	2,953	35.2	240
Kariba	5,167	54.4	4,335	45.6	161
Makonde	6,243	66.1	3,204	33.9	250
Mhondoro	3,793	56.2	2,962	43.8	175
Zvimba North	7,147	57.3	5,327	42.7	366
Zvimba South	12,558	78.7	3,402	21.3	599
MASVINGO PROVINCE
Bikita	3,939	53.0	3,497	47.0	600
Chiredzi North	5,149	44.7	6,369	55.3	282
Chiredzi South	3,953	59.9	2,649	40.1	150
Chivi North	3,402	66.1	1,748	33.9	156
Chivi South	3,939	61.5	2,465	38.5	157
Gutu-Bikita	3,162	51.8	2,940	48.2	171
Gutu North	5,062	57.2	3,790	42.8	254
Gutu South	3,963	60.1	2,631	39.9	139
Masvingo Central	4,682	37.6	7,773	62.4	209
Masvingo North	3,248	47.5	3,593	52.5	690
Masvingo South	5,947	70.5	2,491	29.5	189
Mwenezi	7,017	72.2	2,704	27.8	496
Zaka East	3,381	53.3	2,963	46.7	179
Zaka West	5,043	55.5	4,045	44.5	1,285
MATABELELAND NORTH PROVINCE
Binga	2,602	32.9	5,296	67.1	591
Bubi-Umguza	6,136	55.3	4,957	44.7	341
Hwange East	3,302	39.6	5,046	60.4	234
Hwange West	2,213	24.6	6,770	75.4	168
Lupane	3,844	61.5	2,408	38.5	154
Nkayi	3,750	53.3	3,291	46.7	260
Tsholotsho	5,066	59.4	3,456	60.6	179
MATABELELAND SOUTH PROVINCE
Beitbridge	7,337	66.1	3,766	33.9	813
Bulilimamangwe North	5,259	64.7	2,865	35.3	229
Bulilimamangwe South	4,520	51.5	4,261	48.5	220
Gwanda	5,861	46.5	6,747	53.5	334
Insiza	3,112	42.7	4,176	57.3	401
Matobo	3,805	48.0	4,130	52.0	286
Umzingwane	3,712	39.0	5,814	61.0	175
MIDLANDS PROVINCE
Chirumanzu	4,921	63.0	2,894	37.0	276
Gokwe Central	9,133	68.0	4,296	32.0	556
Gokwe East	5,074	65.0	2,731	35.0	186
Gokwe North	6,466	66.2	3,298	33.8	437
Gokwe South	6,110	69.7	2,660	30.3	936
Gweru Central	4,250	34.9	7,945	65.1	167
Kwekwe Central	4,778	35.4	8,702	64.6	172
Kwekwe North	7,718	63.0	4,528	37.0	306
Kwekwe West	4,821	40.8	6,994	59.2	1,148
Mberengwa East	8,400	81.5	1,906	18.5	738
Mberengwa West	8,149	75.7	2,616	24.3	313
Mkoba	4,191	32.2	8,842	67.8	153
Shurugwi	6,780	68.0	3,191	32.0	215
Vungu	3,492	47.3	3,890	52.7	190
Zvishavane	7,904	56.5	6,079	43.5	288
