= FPZ =

FPZ can be an abbreviation for

- Forum Party of Zimbabwe
- FpZ: an EEG electrode site according to the 10-20 system
