= 1995 Zimbabwean parliamentary election =

- 8–9 April 1995

120 of the 150 seats in the House of Assembly
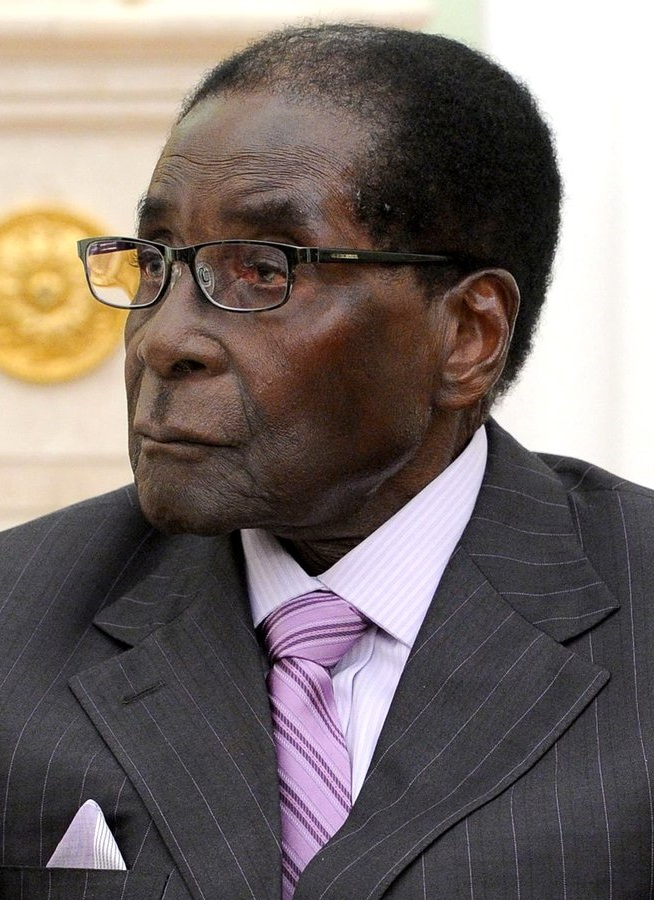

	Majority party	Minority party
Leader	Robert Mugabe	Ndabaningi Sithole
Party	ZANU–PF	ZANU–Ndonga
Last election	117 seats	1 seat
Seats won	118	2
Seat change	▲1	▲1
Popular vote	1,143,349	97,470
Percentage	81.38%	6.94%

Parliamentary elections were held in Zimbabwe on 8 and 9 April 1995 to elect members to the House of Assembly of Zimbabwe. The ruling Zimbabwe African National Union - Patriotic Front won an overwhelming majority of the seats. There were 120 constituencies but 55 members were returned unopposed. The elections were not free and fair, as the authoritarian ZANU-PF party abused election rules and intimidated the opposition.

The elections occurred under the context of controversial constitutional changes and a disastrous economic structural adjustment programme.

== Results ==
There were 4,803,866 registered voters across the country, but 2,214,358 were in uncontested constituencies.

Graph of the party split among 120 seats.
Party	Votes	%	Seats	+/–
ZANU–PF	1,143,349	81.38	118	+1
ZANU–Ndonga	97,470	6.94	2	+1
Forum Party	84,219	5.99	0	New
Zimbabwe Congress Party	3,779	0.27	0	New
Zimbabwe Federal Party	3,381	0.24	0	New
Zimbabwe Aristocrats	1,571	0.11	0	New
African National Party	431	0.03	0	New
Independents	70,818	5.04	0	0
Total	1,405,018	100.00	120	0
Valid votes	1,405,018	95.70		
Invalid/blank votes	63,173	4.30		
Total votes	1,468,191	100.00		
Registered voters/turnout	2,589,508	56.70		
Source: Nohlen et al.

=== By constituency ===
Constituency	Candidate	Party	Votes	%
BULAWAYO PROVINCE (9 seats)
BULAWAYO NORTH	John Nkomo	ZANU–PF	9,901	71.2
BULAWAYO NORTH	Arnold Payne	Independent	2,600	18.7
BULAWAYO NORTH	Joyce Mahere	ZANU–Ndonga	1,407	10.1
BULAWAYO SOUTH	Zenzo Nsimbi	ZANU–PF	15,631	64.6
BULAWAYO SOUTH	Ega Sansole	Forum Party	8,558	35.4
LOBENGULA	Isaac Nyathi	ZANU–PF	19,500	82.0
LOBENGULA	Robson Maphosa	Forum Party	4,290	18.0
LUVEVE	Angelinah Masuku	ZANU–PF	12,703	70.4
LUVEVE	Mabikwa Thabane	Forum Party	3,325	18.4
LUVEVE	Thomas Ndlovu	ZANU–Ndonga	1,143	6.3
LUVEVE	Twoboy Jubane	Independent	885	4.9
MAKOKOBA	Sithembiso Nyoni	ZANU–PF	13,280	78.9
MAKOKOBA	Molly Richardson	Forum Party	3,556	21.1
MPOPOMA	Sikhanyiso Ndlovu	ZANU–PF	18,967	77.6
MPOPOMA	Paul Siwela	Independent	4,709	19.3
MPOPOMA	Stephen Mhindurwa	ZANU–Ndonga	767	3.1
NKULUMANE	Dumiso Dabengwa	ZANU–PF	Unopposed	
PELANDABA	Joseph Msika	ZANU–PF	16,879	80.3
PELANDABA	Richard Ncube	ZFP	2,496	11.9
PELANDABA	Florence Nderemani	ZANU–Ndonga	1,643	7.8
PUMULA-MAGWEGWE	Norman Zikhali	ZANU–PF	15,756	74.1
PUMULA-MAGWEGWE	Garreth Mahlangu	Forum Party	3,595	16.9
PUMULA-MAGWEGWE	Kenneth Hlatshwayo	ZANU–Ndonga	1,904	9.0
HARARE PROVINCE (20 seats)
BUDIRIRO	Gladys Hokoyo	ZANU–PF	19,721	83.9
BUDIRIRO	Pearson Musakwa	ZCP	3,779	16.1
CHITUNGWIZA EAST	Edward Ticharwa Njekesa	ZANU–PF	15,475	85.9
CHITUNGWIZA EAST	Ephraim Dhliwayo	ZANU–Ndonga	2,536	14.1
CHITUNGWIZE WEST	Witness Mangwende	ZANU–PF	Unopposed	
DZIVARESEKWA	Edson Wadyewata	ZANU–PF	19,830	80.7
DZIVARESEKWA	Richard Chitumba	Forum Party	2,168	8.8
DZIVARESEKWA	Cynthia Marumbwa	ZANU–Ndonga	1,782	7.2
DZIVARESEKWA	Elijah Manjeya	Independent	806	3.3
GLEN NORAH	Thomas Mapanzure	ZANU–PF	20,889	80.7
GLEN NORAH	Tennyson Manbande	ZANU–Ndonga	5,001	19.3
GLEN VIEW	Clive Chimbi	ZANU–PF	15,204	81.7
GLEN VIEW	Samson Dhliwayo	ZANU–Ndonga	3,408	18.3
HARARE CENTRAL	Florence Chitauro	ZANU–PF	9,417	69.1
HARARE CENTRAL	Enoch Dumbutshena	Forum Party	3,858	28.3
HARARE CENTRAL	Bernard Gwati	Independent	232	1.7
HARARE CENTRAL	Clive Samvura	Independent	113	0.8
HARARE EAST	Tirivanhu Mudariki	ZANU–PF	15,959	73.1
HARARE EAST	Clive Puzey	Forum Party	4,871	22.3
HARARE EAST	Mika Mushayabasa	Independent	1,001	4.6
HARARE NORTH	Nyasha Chikwinya	ZANU–PF	13,360	72.3
HARARE NORTH	Trudy Stevenson	Forum Party	4,340	23.5
HARARE NORTH	Shaiseni Nyamhunga	ZANU–Ndonga	789	4.3
HARARE SOUTH	Vivian Mwashita	ZANU–PF	6,287	50.9
HARARE SOUTH	Margaret Dongo	Independent	5,190	42.0
HARARE SOUTH	Joshua Cohen	Independent	886	7.2
HATFIELD	Irene Zindi	ZANU–PF	Unopposed	
HIGHFIELD	Richard Shambanbeva	ZANU–PF	18,534	80.4
HIGHFIELD	Henry Mahlangu	ZANU–Ndonga	4,531	19.6
KAMBUZUMA	Oliver Chidawa	ZANU–PF	Unopposed	
KUWADZANA	Zebron Chawaipira	ZANU–PF	Unopposed	
MABVUKU	Pamela Tungamirai	ZANU–PF	20,223	71.2
MABVUKU	Geoffrey Chirinda	Forum Party	4,280	15.1
MABVUKU	Newton Kajawu	ZANU–Ndonga	3,915	13.8
MBARE EAST	Anthony Gara	ZANU–PF	15,762	86.3
MBARE EAST	Patricia Mpange	ZANU–Ndonga	2,510	13.7
MBARE WEST	Ephraim Masawi	ZANU–PF	14,795	83.0
MBARE WEST	Vesta Sithole	ZANU–Ndonga	3,036	17.0
MUFAKOSE	Sabina Thembani	ZANU–PF	18,355	81.4
MUFAKOSE	Kingston Marimo	Forum Party	2,787	12.4
MUFAKOSE	Patrick Marime	Independent	1,412	6.3
ST. MARY'S	Joseph Macheka	ZANU–PF	Unopposed	
ZENGEZA	Christopher Chigumba	ZANU–PF	Unopposed	
MANICALAND PROVINCE (13 seats)
BUHERA NORTH	Dzimbabwe Senderayi	ZANU–PF	Unopposed	
BUHERA SOUTH	Kumbirai Kangai	ZANU–PF	24,034	93.1
BUHERA SOUTH	Agnes Makuyana	ZANU–Ndonga	1,782	6.9
CHIMANIMANI	Michael Mataure	ZANU–PF	15,531	76.6
CHIMANIMANI	Tinarwa Nason Mwazviwanza	ZANU–Ndonga	4,743	23.4
CHIPINGE NORTH	Fred Sithole	ZANU–Ndonga	10,806	63.1
CHIPINGE NORTH	Shadreck Chitima	ZANU–PF	6,019	35.1
CHIPINGE NORTH	Kingdom Chigumo	Independent	301	1.8
CHIPINGE SOUTH	Ndabaningi Sithole	ZANU–Ndonga	15,490	76.6
CHIPINGE SOUTH	Edgar Musikavanhu	ZANU–PF	4,722	23.4
MAKONI EAST	Didymus Mutasa	ZANU–PF	Unopposed	
MAKONI NORTH	Tendayi Mberi	ZANU–PF	Unopposed	
MAKONI WEST	Moven Mahachi	ZANU–PF	21,470	93.6
MAKONI WEST	Evans Ngwena	Independent	1,459	6.4
MUTARE NORTH	Oppah Rushesha	ZANU–PF	10,550	80.5
MUTARE NORTH	Fred Gomendo	ZANU–Ndonga	2,550	19.5
MUTARE SOUTH	Lazarus Nzarayebani	ZANU–PF	11,579	70.1
MUTARE SOUTH	Eddie Musabayana	Independent	3,516	21.3
MUTARE SOUTH	Denford Musiyarira	ZANU–Ndonga	1,420	8.6
MUTARE WEST	Shepherd Mukwekwezeke	ZANU–PF	16,485	90.6
MUTARE WEST	Efilda Mutsiwegota	ZANU–Ndonga	1,715	9.4
MUTASA	Misheck Chinamasa	ZANU–PF	Unopposed	
NYANGA	Freddie Saruchera	ZANU–PF	Unopposed	
MASHONALAND CENTRAL PROVINCE (6 seats)
BINDURA	Caniso Dengu	ZANU–PF	Unopposed	
GURUVE NORTH	Paul Mazikana	ZANU–PF	Unopposed	
GURUVE SOUTH	Edward Chininga	ZANU–PF	Unopposed	
MAZOWE EAST	Chenhamo Chimutengwende	ZANU–PF	Unopposed	
RUSHINGA	Younus Patel	ZANU–PF	29,083	97.3
RUSHINGA	Timothy Mukwengwe	ZANU–Ndonga	808	2.7
SHAMVA	Nicholas Goche	ZANU–PF	27,330	94.9
SHAMVA	Godfrey Mumbamarwo	ZANU–Ndonga	1,461	5.1
