= Ndabaningi Sithole =

Zimbabwean revolutionary and founder of ZANU (1920–2000)

The Reverend Ndabaningi Sithole
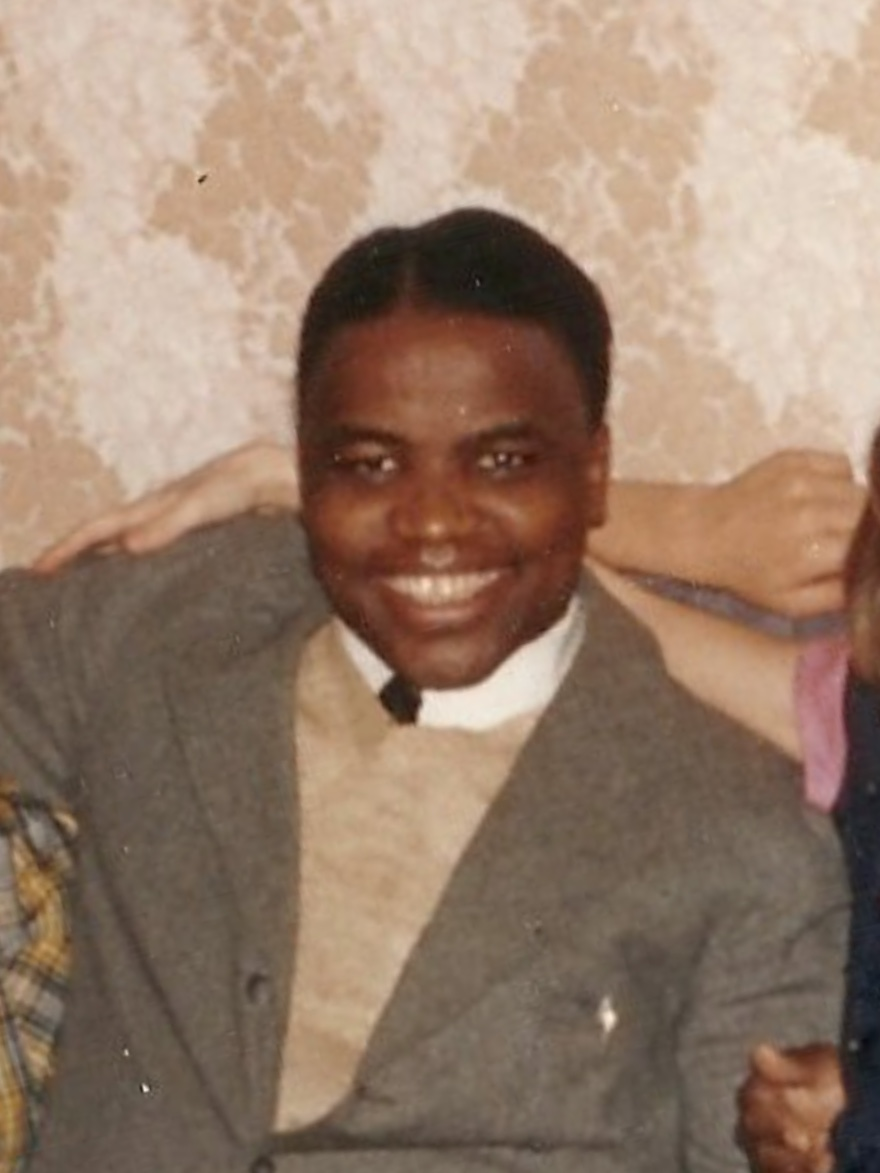
- Sithole in 1955

Member of Parliament of Zimbabwe for Chipinge South
- In office 1995–2000
- Preceded by: Goodson Sithole
- Succeeded by: Wilson Khumbula

Personal details
- Born: 21 July 1920 Nyamandhlovu, Rhodesia
- Died: 12 December 2000 (aged 80) Philadelphia, Pennsylvania, US
- Party: ZANU (1963–1975); ZANU–Ndonga (after 1975)
- Spouse: Vesta Zvamwaida Sithole
- Children: 5
- Education: Andover Newton Theological School

Ndabaningi Sithole (21 July 1920 – 12 December 2000) was a Zimbabwean politician and statesman who, in July 1963, founded the Zimbabwe African National Union (ZANU), a militant, nationalist organisation that opposed the government of Rhodesia. He worked as a United Church of Christ in Zimbabwe (UCCZ) minister. He spent 10 years in prison after the government banned ZANU. A rift along tribal lines split ZANU in 1975, and he lost the 1980 elections to Robert Mugabe.

== Early life ==
Sithole was born in Nyamandlovu, Southern Rhodesia, on 21 July 1920. Sithole's father was Ndau and his mother was Ndebele. He studied education in the United States from 1955 to 1958, and was ordained a Methodist minister in 1958. The publication of his book African Nationalism and its immediate prohibition by the minority government motivated his entry into politics. During his studies in the United States, he attended the Andover Newton Theological School and the First Church in Newton (which was founded in 1665), both of which are located in Newton, Massachusetts.

== ZANU ==
Sithole was one of the founders and chief architect of the Zimbabwe African National Union party in August 1963, in conjunction with Herbert Chitepo, Robert Mugabe and Edgar Tekere in the Highfields House of Enos Nkala. In 1964, there was a party Congress at Gwelo, where Sithole was elected president and Robert Mugabe was appointed to be his secretary general. ZANU was banned in 1964 by Ian Smith's government. After being arrested on 22 June 1964, Sithole spent 10 years in prison. alongside Mugabe, Tekere, Nyagumbo and Takawira for his political activities. While in prison, he specifically authorised Chitepo to continue the struggle from abroad as a representative of ZANU. Sithole was convicted on a charge of plotting to assassinate Ian Smith, and he was released from prison in 1974.

On 18 March 1975, Chitepo was assassinated in Lusaka, Zambia, with a car bomb. Mugabe, in Mozambique at the time, was unanimously chosen to be the first secretary of ZANU. There was a factional split later that year, with many Ndebele following Joshua Nkomo into the equally militant ZAPU. Sithole eventually founded the moderate ZANU-Ndonga party, which renounced violent struggle, while the Shona-dominated ZANU (now called ZANU PF) followed Mugabe with a more militant agenda.

Sithole joined Abel Muzorewa's transitional government under the Internal Settlement on 31 July 1979. In September 1979, he attended the Lancaster House Agreement, chaired by Lord Carrington, which paved the way for fresh elections, but his ZANU-Ndonga Party's supporters and their villages were targeted by Mugabe's ZANLA troops and it failed to win any seats in the 1980 elections.

Sithole's exit from ZANU was claimed by Mugabe to have been caused by his neglecting the fighters in Zambia (where their camp was bombed, resulting in many fatalities and casualties).

== Exile and return ==
Declaring that his life was in danger from political enemies, Sithole went into self-imposed exile, first in the United Kingdom in the early-1980s and then in Silver Spring, Maryland, United States, around 1984, not returning to Zimbabwe until January 1992.

He was elected to parliament for his tribal stronghold of Chipinge in southeastern Zimbabwe in 1995, and was a candidate in the 1996 presidential election (though he withdrew shortly before the election after claiming that Mugabe's ZANU-PF was undermining his campaign). In December 1997, a court tried and convicted him of conspiring with Chimwenje to assassinate Mugabe, and the government disqualified him from attending parliament. Sithole's small opposition group again won the Chipinge seat in the June 2000 elections.

He was granted the right to appeal, and an appeal was filed, but the case was never heard by the Supreme Court. He was allowed bail because of his deteriorating health. He died on 12 December 2000, in Philadelphia, Pennsylvania, United States. The author of three books on African politics, he was survived by his wife, Vesta, and five adult children.

His farm, "Porta Farm", situated 25 kilometres (16 mi) from Harare on Bulawayo Road, was legally purchased in 1992 under "willing buyer – willing seller" arrangements. It was later confiscated by Robert Mugabe's ZANU-PF government on the grounds that it harboured the "undesirables" of Harare. These were people who had been left homeless after being summarily evicted from shanties in Harare before the Commonwealth Heads of Government Meeting 1991. Sithole had felt compassion for them, and what he felt was the breach of their human rights; he therefore had invited some of them to stay on the farm. This incensed the government, which then carried out an eviction operation. This was co-ordinated by the Ministry of Local Government and National Housing as well as the City of Harare. Pre-dawn raids were carried out and, in the aftermath, Porta Farm was confiscated.

== Books ==
Sithole was the most prolific black author in Rhodesia. He published 12 books, including The Polygamist, a novel published in 1972 by The Third Press/Joseph Okpaku Publishing Co., Inc., New York (ISBN 0893880361).
