= 2005 Zimbabwean parliamentary election =

- 31 March 2005

120 of the 150 seats in the House of Assembly
- Registered: 5,658,624 (▲6.99%)
- Turnout: 47.66% (▼0.67pp)
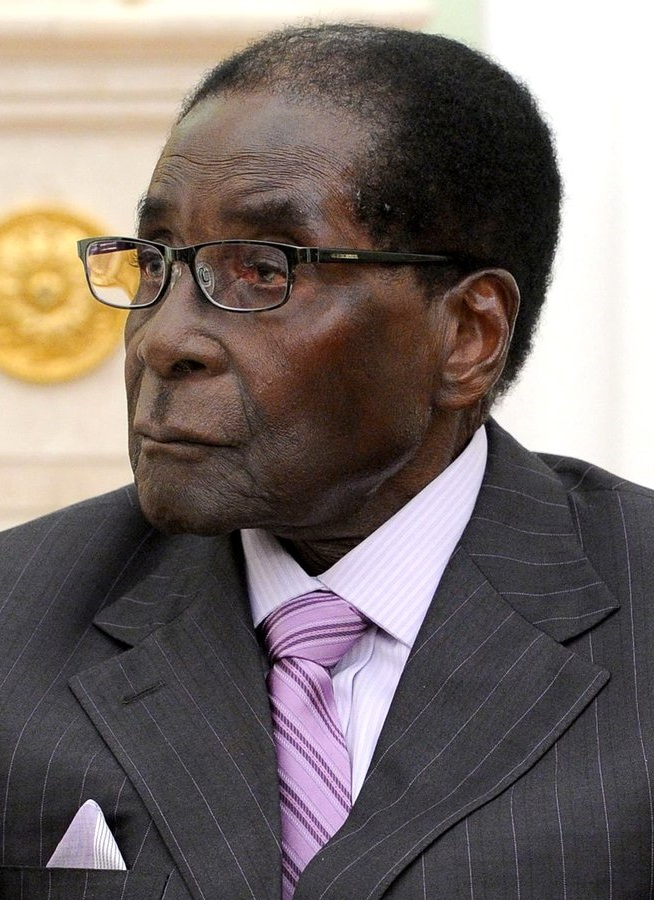

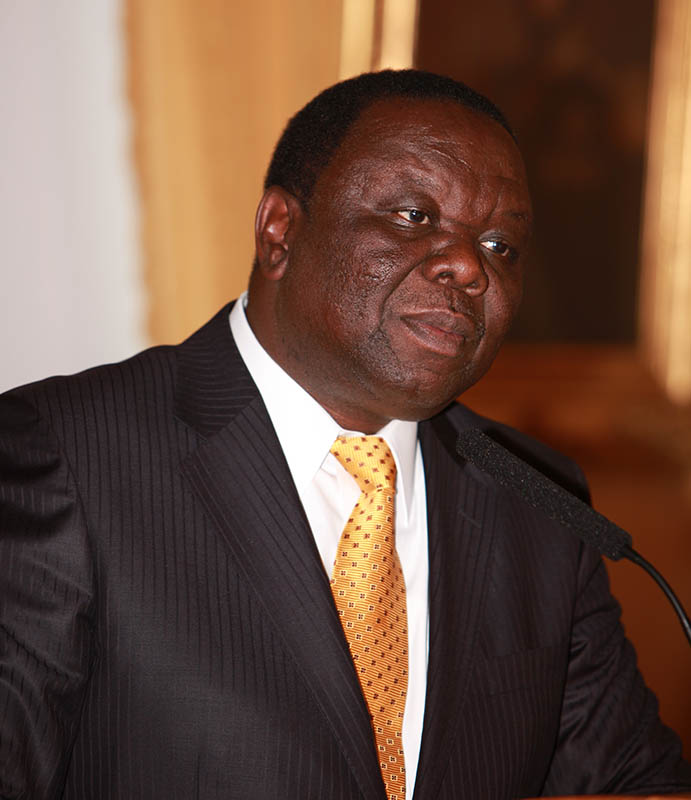
| | Majority party | Minority party |
|---|---|---|
| Leader | Robert Mugabe | Morgan Tsvangirai |
| Party | ZANU–PF | MDC |
| Last election | 48.47%, 62 seats | 46.84%, 57 seats |
| Seats won | 78 | 41 |
| Seat change | ▲16 | ▼16 |
| Popular vote | 1,569,867 | 1,041,292 |
| Percentage | 59.59% | 39.52% |

Parliamentary elections were held in Zimbabwe on 31 March 2005 to elect members to the Zimbabwe House of Assembly. All of the 120 elected seats in the 150-seat House of Assembly were up for election. There were a further 20 members appointed by the President and ten elected by traditional chiefs, who mostly support the government. Electoral colleges for the election of the ten chiefs to the parliament were to be held on 8 April.

The ruling Zimbabwe African National Union – Patriotic Front party (ZANU-PF) of President Robert Mugabe won the elections with an increased majority against the opposition Movement for Democratic Change (MDC). ZANU-PF won 78 seats to the MDC's 41, with one independent. (In the 2000 election, the ZANU-PF won 62 seats to the MDC's 57). According to the Zimbabwe Electoral Commission, ZANU-PF polled nearly 60% of the vote, an increase of 11% over the 2000 results. The MDC's vote fell 9 to 39 percent. As a result of the election, ZANU-PF had a two-thirds majority in the legislature, allowing the government to change the Constitution.

The elections were not free and fair, as the ruling ZANU-PF party engaged in violence against the opposition.

As the results became clear the MDC denounced what it called "the sham elections," which it said had been marked by massive electoral fraud. "The elections cannot be judged to be free and fair," an MDC statement said. "The distorted nature of the pre-election playing field and the failure to address core democratic deficits precluded a free and fair election." The MDC claimed it would have won 90 seats if the vote had been free and fair.

A detailed account of the MDC's allegations of electoral fraud can be seen at the MDC website. Sokwanele, a Zimbabwean underground pro-democracy movement, also released a report entitled “What happened on Thursday night”. Their report focuses specifically on the time after voting until results were announced.

== Background ==
Voter education In accordance with an Act of Parliament:

- The Zimbabwe Electoral Commission (ZEC) controls all voter education.
- They will supply materials for use in voter education.
- Non-Zimbabwean citizens are strictly banned from voter education.
- No foreign funding allowed for voter education, unless donated through ZEC.
- Anyone performing voter education (from approved materials only) must supply full contact details and address, as well as funding sources.
- Fines and imprisonment face transgressors.

Polling stations

High Court Judge George Chiweshe, who chairs the recently established Zimbabwe Electoral Commission, stated that 8227 polling stations will be set up in all of the country's 10 provinces – more than double the number used in previous elections.

Harare alone is expected to have 522 polling stations, up from 167 polling stations in the presidential elections. For the first time since independence from white minority rule in 1980, Zimbabwe will be holding elections on one day as opposed to two. Ballot counting will also take place at individual polling stations and new, translucent ballot boxes will replace wooden ones used in previous elections.

Voting must take place at these polling stations: any Zimbabweans living overseas must therefore have registered to be in the electoral roll by 4 February, and must vote in Zimbabwe. Requirements such as these are not uncommon in democratic countries.

== Timetable and voters roll ==
The election date was set by President Robert Mugabe on 1 February. 31 March was a public holiday to enable easier voter participation. The parliament was dissolved on 30 March, one day before the elections. The voters' roll was closed on 4 February. Nomination courts sat on 18 February to receive names of those intending to contest in the polls (results).

The voters roll is the cornerstone of "one person – one vote." Attempts to verify this have been extremely difficult to carry out because of obstruction and non-co-operation from the Zimbabwe Registrar General.

The Registrar General refused to release the roll in electronic form, supported by judgments from the Supreme Court, necessitating any analysis to work from a paper copy. Electoral Law is very specific in that the roll must be readily and freely available to any person, however it took two years to obtain such a copy.

In February, South African president Thabo Mbeki conceded that Zimbabwe's voters roll was defective and needed to be looked at.

Only a single MDC constituency managed to complete the audit ahead of the deadline for objections to the voters' roll – a month before the poll.

In that constituency, 64 percent of people in one densely populated block in Harare North, are not known at the addresses given on the voters' roll.

Tens of thousands of former workers on white-owned farms were deprived of their votes in the March election. The workers were expelled from their homes on farms along with their employers. Thus they did not have the necessary wad of official documents required to register as voters. In addition, many could not afford to travel to their original farm constituencies to verify their details on voters' rolls. Recently enacted laws demand that potential voters provide proof of residence before they can register. Rural Zimbabweans either produce letters from their headman or chief or from their farm employer as proof of residence.

== Campaign ==
The main parties participating were:

- The Zimbabwe African National Union - Patriotic Front. ZANU-PF forms the current government and is led by the Zimbabwean president, Robert Mugabe. Both it and the opposition party expect ZANU-PF to end up with the majority of seats in parliament.
- The main opposition party is the Movement for Democratic Change, led by Morgan Tsvangirai
- Zimbabwe African National Union - Ndonga – spokesperson Reketai Semwayo
- Zimbabwe People's Democratic Party
- Zimbabwe Youth in Alliance

Zanu-PF is using claimed interference of Tony Blair, the British prime minister, and United States president George W. Bush in Zimbabwean politics, as an election issue. ZANU-PF is also stressing the benefits obtained through its policy of land reform.

The MDC sees the main issues as being jobs, food, peace, affordable AIDS drugs and honest, competent emphatic leadership. Their rallying cry is Change!, and their symbol is an open hand.

Roy Bennett's wife Heather Bennett intended to stand for Chimanimani rural district after the nomination court refused papers filed on behalf of her jailed husband.

However, on 15 March Zimbabwe's new Electoral Court ruled he could contest parliamentary elections. Nomination would be accepted on 4 April, while polling would take place on 30 April. An appeal by the government reversed this. The appeal was not contested by the MDC or the Bennetts. They considered that voters would be safer polling on the same day as the rest of the country, where a delay would allow Zanu-PF to concentrate efforts in that district. The MDC has never won a by-election.

Roy Bennett's application for release before the elections, on the basis of good behaviour and dissolution of the parliament that ordered the incarceration, failed.

Sikhumbuzo Ndiweni, a former ZANU PF Bulawayo Provincial Information and Publicity Secretary, is co-ordinating the Independent Candidates Solidarity Network. Members are:

- Margaret Dongo (Harare Central)
- Former Information Minister Jonathan Moyo (Tsholotsho)
  - The former information minister registered to run as an independent in the constituency after he was excluded from running as the ZANU-PF candidate. The party had decided that a woman should contest the Tsholotsho constituency instead of him, a decision that was linked to Moyo's opposition to Joyce Mujuru. He will be facing Musa Ncube-Mathema, the wife of Bulawayo governor Cain Mathema, standing for Zanu-PF.
  - In the 2000 election, Mtoliki Sibanda of the MDC won with 69% of the vote over Mathema of Zanu-PF. Sibanda will be defending his seat again in 2005.
- Dunmore Makuwaza (Mbare)
- Tendekai Mswata (St Mary's)
- Fanuel Chiremba (Tafara-Mabvuku)
- Peter Nyoni (Hwange East)
- Charles Mpofu (Bulawayo South)
- Leonard Nkala (Phelandaba/Mpopoma)
- Stars Mathe (Pumula/Luveve)
- ~~Lloyd Siyoka (Beitbridge)~~ withdrew in favour of Kembo Mohadi of Zanu-PF
- Godwin Shiri (Mberengwa East)

== Conduct ==
The opposition MDC and Jonathan Moyo alleged that voters have been threatened with starvation or violence if they fail to support Zanu-PF. No-go areas have been declared in Bindura.

Zanu-PF candidates took over control of grain stocks in Manicaland and Masvingo from the Grain Marketing Board (GMB) and are vetting beneficiaries.

Muchauraya said in Chipinge South, Enock Porusingazi was issuing badges inscribed "Election 2005" to supporters attending his rallies. The badges are then used as a ticket to buy maize.

On 8 March at Betura village, ward 16, more than 2 000 people were denied access to buy grain for allegedly failing to produce the badges. Only 200 people who had attended Zanu-PF rallies over the weekend had the badges and were allowed to buy maize.

=== Vote-counting ===
Zimbabwe's main opposition party said an investigation indicates massive electoral fraud in at least 30 seats won by the ruling Zanu-PF party.

The Movement for Democratic Change said in 11 races the winning Zanu-PF candidate got more votes in the official returns than the government's own electoral commission said were cast in those races.

In each case, the MDC said its candidate had an unassailable lead, polling more than half the official total of votes cast. However, the official returns showed 183,000 more votes than the electoral commission said were cast.

MDC spokesperson Paul Themba Nyathi said the MDC limited its analysis to the 30 seats because the electoral commission refused to release figures for other races, a decision he said "indicates widespread irregularities" in those other areas.

== Observer mission statements ==
Zimbabwe ratified new Southern African Development Community rules in August 2004 governing principles and guidelines on elections; however, no reports on Zimbabwe's compliance have been issued by the body. One of the stipulations is that SADC monitors be invited 90 days before the poll.

By 4 February, an SADC team tasked with the responsibility of ensuring that Zimbabwe complies with the regional protocol had yet to receive permission to visit.

Non-government organisations (NGOs), among them Amnesty International, 32 Nigerian NGOs and 17 from Zimbabwe, have expressed concern about the continued abuses of human rights in the country. African Union Chairman, President Olusegun Obasanjo, has been urged to prevail on Zimbabwe, to fully implement recommendations of the African Commission on Human and Peoples' Rights (ACHPR), on improving human rights conditions. The Commission made a fact-finding mission to Zimbabwe in June 2002, and the Union's findings and recommendations were adopted in January 2005, at its summit in Abuja.

"The majority of human rights concerns documented by the fact-finding mission in 2002 remain serious problems today," the NGOs said.

On 19 February 2005, 32 nations were invited by President Robert Mugabe to observe the parliamentary elections in Zimbabwe.

- Domestic poll observers require a 'registration fee' of US$ (in local currency) – approximately the monthly minimum wage.
- Approved Zimbabwean observers only announced two days before the elections .
- International observers (except South Africa) are required to pay US$300, while South African observers pay US$100. Of international observer teams, only South African ones have sufficient personnel and resources to cover rural areas.

Other organisations among those invited are the Zimbabwe Council of Churches, Law Society of Zimbabwe, Zimbabwe Election Support Network, Zimbabwe Lawyers for Human Rights, Affirmative Action Group, Evangelical Fellowship of Zimbabwe, Centre for Peace Initiatives in Southern Africa and the Southern African Institute for Democracy and Good Governance.

Aziz Pahad, deputy foreign minister for South Africa, said the country has been invited to observe the Zimbabwean poll in at least five different capacities.

It has been invited as a member of SADC, as chair of the organ on politics, defence and security, and as a neighbouring country. The ruling African National Congress has also been asked to send an observer team, while parliament has set up a multi-party delegation.

Five members of South Africa's governing African National Congress party arrived in Harare on 10 March headed by James Motlatsi, the first foreign observers.

The 20-member South African parliamentary observer mission led by ANC chief whip Mbulelo Goniwe left for Zimbabwe on 14 March, and will return to South Africa on 3 April. On 18 April, the Independent Democrats Member of Parliament and mission member Vincent Gore withdrew, saying that since their arrival in Harare, the mission had been plagued by inefficiency, bad planning "and wasted time".

There is also a South African government delegation, led by Labour Minister Membathisi Mdladlana, which arrived 15 March.

The 50-member SADC observer mission including 10 South African delegates headed by Minerals and Energy Minister Phumzile Mlambo-Ngcuka (later Deputy President), spokesperson South African foreign affairs official Nomfanelo Kota, left on 15 March.

The Congress of South African Trade Unions (COSATU)—a member of the South African ruling party alliance— sent a fact-finding mission in October 2004 to talk to the Zimbabwe Congress of Trade Unions (ZCTU) and research conditions for a fair poll. They were deported from Zimbabwe within hours after police broke up a meeting between them and ZCTU.

On 2 February 2005, a second mission led by Zwelinzima Vavi, Secretary-General of COSATU, was turned back at Harare airport, charged under Section 18A of the Immigration Act which relates to prohibited immigrants. In response, George Bizos, a respected human rights lawyer, said that all Southern African Development Community members are allowed to enter Zimbabwe without applying for a visa.

After a meeting the next day between the unions in South Africa Cosatu spokesperson Patrick Craven said "It is quite clear at the moment as things stand that there cannot be free and fair elections".

ZCTU requested that an independent electoral commission be established and international observers be allowed in the country, and the government also needed to scrap strict laws restricting the opposition's access to the media and barring it from holding public rallies and meetings without police permission.

Under the Public Order and Security Act (POSA), it is a requirement for organisers of public meetings to first notify the police of the intention to gather. It is an offence, under the same law, for more than five people to meet without notifying the police, who have the prerogative to permit or deny permission to hold public meetings. ZTCU suggested that the date of the elections be postponed. ZCTU themselves have been barred from observing the election.

Amnesty International has said that Zanu-PF has used threats and intimidation against opposition supporters ahead of the elections which now cannot be free and fair.

"It is the view of the mission that the 2005 parliamentary elections in Zimbabwe reflect the free will of the people of Zimbabwe" said South African Labour Minister Membathisi Mdladlana, who led the South African government observer mission for the elections.

Mdladlana said the elections on Thursday "by and large" conformed to election guidelines adopted by southern African leaders last year for holding a democratic vote.

"Let me congratulate the people of Zimbabwe for holding a peaceful, credible and well-organised election which we feel reflects the will of the people" said Phumzile Mlambo-Ngcuka, the South African cabinet minister that led the 55-member, 11-country observer mission from the Southern African Development Community.

Mlambo Ngcuka said the observer mission had asked the opposition Movement for Democratic Change (MDC) to provide evidence to support their claims of discrepancies in 32 of the 120 constituencies.

"We have received complaints and asked for information. We still don't have it. There is not much more we can do." she said.

== Results ==
The results showed the same pattern as in 2000. The MDC won virtually all the seats in the main cities, Harare and Bulawayo, where civil society organisations are relatively strong and able to prevent electoral manipulation. The MDC also won a majority of seats in the southern region of Matabeleland, where the Ndebele people, once supporters of Joshua Nkomo's ZAPU, continue to oppose the Shona-dominated ZANU-PF. But in rural Mashonaland, in central and northern Zimbabwe, where the majority of the population lives, ZANU-PF won all but one seat.

In some notable local results, Emmerson Mnangagwa, speaker of the previous parliament, and tipped at one time to succeed Mugabe but recently fallen from grace, lost his seat Kwe-kwe to the MDC's Blessing Chebundo. Jonathan Moyo, an independent, won the Tsholotsho constituency from the MDC. Another significant loss for the MDC was Chimanimani, contested by Roy Bennett's wife Heather.

The Zimbabwe Election Support Network, which had some 6,000 observers in the 8,000 polling stations, says that some 10% of would-be voters were turned away, either because their names were not on the electoral roll, they did not have the right identity papers, or they were in the wrong constituency.

Graph of the party split among 150 seats.
| Party | Votes | % | Seats | +/– |
|---|---|---|---|---|
| ZANU–PF | 1,569,867 | 59.59 | 78 | +16 |
| Movement for Democratic Change | 1,041,292 | 39.52 | 41 | –16 |
| ZANU–Ndonga | 6,608 | 0.25 | 0 | –1 |
| Zimbabwe Youth in Alliance | 594 | 0.02 | 0 | – |
| Zimbabwe People's Democratic Party | 61 | 0.00 | 0 | – |
| Independents | 16,223 | 0.62 | 1 | +1 |
| Presidential appointees | | | 20 | 0 |
| Chiefs | | | 10 | 0 |
| Total | 2,634,645 | 100.00 | 150 | 0 |
| Valid votes | 2,634,645 | 97.70 | | |
| Invalid/blank votes | 62,025 | 2.30 | | |
| Total votes | 2,696,670 | 100.00 | | |
| Registered voters/turnout | 5,658,624 | 47.66 | | |
Source: African Elections Database
