= Chimwenje =

Zimbabwean militant organisation based in Mozambique

Chimwenje was a Zimbabwean militant organisation based in Manica Province, Mozambique. Its leader was Armando Mabache. The movement allegedly enjoyed a close association with RENAMO, a right-wing Mozambican political party and former insurgent force.

Armando Mabache was a former RENAMO general who was dismissed as part of a general demobilisation campaign following the end of the Mozambican Civil War. Chimwenje's recruits were also trained by RENAMO militia troops.

Aspects of Chimwenje's ideology and agenda remain unclear. It was dedicated to toppling Zimbabwean President Robert Mugabe, and first entered prominence in mid-1995. The group retained somewhat ambiguous political ties to prominent Zimbabwean opposition leader Ndabaningi Sithole, and its ranks included several known associates of Sithole, including one of his former bodyguards. In October 1995 Sithole was arrested on suspicion that he was involved with a Chimwenje plot to assassinate President Mugabe. When questioned he expressed awareness of the militants and simply stated that they were Zimbabwean exiles who wished to return to their country.

Chimwenje militants were believed to be training on Mozambican soil for cross-border raids into Zimbabwe. Following a number of clashes between the guerrillas and the Mozambique Defence Armed Forces (FADM) around early 1996, Mozambican President Joaquim Chissano announced he would seek the expulsion of Chimwenje from the country.

In mid-1996, media reports surfaced that Chimwenje was planning a major offensive. The guerrillas began laying land mines across Manica Province, damaging some equipment owned by an Italian firm contracted to repair infrastructure destroyed by the recent civil war. In response, the Mozambican government agreed to coordinate preemptive border operations with Zimbabwean and Malawian security forces. The topic was discussed at a regional defence summit hosted by Malawi on July 10. Intelligence findings presented at the summit confirmed Armando Mabache as Chimwenje's leader.

Around August, seven Chimwenje guerrillas, including two Zimbabwean nationals and five Mozambican nationals, were captured and given sentences of up to sixteen years' incarceration for crimes ranging from mercenary activity to armed insurrection.

Chimwenje was wiped out by joint operations carried out by the FADM and the Zimbabwe Defence Forces in late 1996.

== Sources ==
- Institute for Security Studies: Zimbabwe - Security Information
