= Margaret Dongo =

Zimbabwean politician

- Born: March 14, 1960 (age 66); Rhodesia (now Zimbabwe)
- Other name: Tichaona Muhondo
- Education: Harvard Kennedy School
- Occupations: Politician, liberation war veteran
- Known for: Challenging ZANU-PF electoral fraud; Advocacy for war veterans
- Political party: ZANU–PF (until 1995); Independent (1995–1998); Zimbabwe Union of Democrats (1998–present)
- Children: 3

Margaret Dongo (born 14 March 1960) is a Zimbabwean politician known for speaking in favor of women's rights and out against corruption. She was an ex-combatant of the 1970s liberation war, served in parliament, and helped establish the Zimbabwe Union of Democrats (ZUD).

== Liberation war ==
In 1975, at age 15, Dongo left secondary school to cross into Mozambique and join the Zimbabwe African National Liberation Army (ZANLA), adopting the moniker Tichaona Muhondo ("The Battle will Decide"). She described then-ZANLA commander Josiah Tongogara as "principled. He was unwavering in knowing what he was fighting for and could not easily be driven into corruption. I believed in him." In December 1979 Dongo was one of the last people to see him alive, explaining later that "We were 18 girls who were having a function and he came to say a few words to bless the occasion."

With the ceasefire, Dongo took a typing course and obtained a telex diploma. In 1980 she worked for the ruling ZANU-PF party in a variety of roles, and then in Mugabe's Prime Ministerial office. She married and had three children.

== Parliament ==
In 1989 she co-founded the National Liberation War Veterans Association to secure the rights of marginalised war veterans. In 1990, sponsored by the NLWVA, Dongo became an MP for Harare East. In Parliament she was an advocate of democracy, human rights, and marginalised groups in Zimbabwe. Her willingness to challenge the ZANU-PF leadership when she felt they had not helped on these issues led to her deselection, and at the 1995 election the boundaries of her constituency were altered in a way unfavourable to her chances of holding the seat.

== Opposition to Mugabe ==
She stood again for Harare South as an independent against ZANU-PF's Vivian Mwashita in 1995. After her defeat by 1,000 votes was announced, Dongo was convinced that the election had been rigged, and challenged the result in court. The subsequent case revealed serious defects in the electoral roll, including the registration of many non-resident voters, suggesting that at least 41% of the names on the roll were inaccurate, and the court judgment in August 1995 invalidated the election. She went back to Harare South as an independent candidate in the re-run. On 25 November 1995 she won the rerun with 3,075 votes to 1,630 for Mwashita, and continued her fight in parliament as a strong advocate for human rights and democracy. She was one of only three opposition MPs.

Dongo hoped to oppose Robert Mugabe in the 1996 Presidential elections but did not meet the minimum age requirement of 40 years. She called on Bishop Abel Muzorewa and Ndabaningi Sithole to withdraw from the election because their participation lent it legitimacy, remarking that "the presidential elections are only for the consumption of the international and donor community, and not for oppressed Zimbabweans". Both did eventually withdraw. The Zimbabwe Broadcasting Corporation was said to have banned its reporters from covering her activities.

On 19 December 1998 Dongo formed the Zimbabwe Union of Democrats in preparation for the 2000 elections. However, she did not get on with Morgan Tsvangirai and the Movement for Democratic Change when that party was created to challenge ZANU-PF control, and the ZUD remained small. Dongo regarded the MDC as being comparable to the Movement for Multiparty Democracy in Zambia which had failed, in her analysis, to live up to its name despite defeating Kenneth Kaunda.

== Land Reform ==
After the 2000 land redistribution, she requested and received a parliamentary written answer in January 2001 detailing beneficiaries. Including land rented out under the tenant farm scheme since 1990, only a handful of these, which range from very large farms to smallholdings, had been given to genuine farmers. According to her, the majority of state-owned commercial farms leased out under Zimbabwe's land resettlement programme had been given to well-connected individuals, most of whom are absentee landlords with no farming experience. Many of the new owners had been given leases for 98 years at advantageous prices, while others have yet to have their lease rates assessed.

She said: "I appeal to my fellow war veterans not to let your suffering be used by selfish and greedy politicians who caused your suffering. This will not benefit you at the end of the day. Comrades, you should stand up and be a watchdog of the government. If you do not, you will have fought for nothing."

== 2000 election ==
Attempting to retain her seat in the 2000 election, Dongo's house was attacked by a group of 60 opponents who threw rocks through the windows. She lost heavily with the MDC taking the seat.

== Post-2000 election ==
After the loss in 2000, she studied at Harvard University's John F. Kennedy School of Government. In August 2015 Dongo announced the formation of a new political party, Movement for People First. Joice Mujuru leads the party and Dongo serves as chairperson for the women's wing.

== See also ==
- 2005 Zimbabwe parliamentary elections
- Politics of Zimbabwe
- List of political parties in Zimbabwe
- Land reform in Zimbabwe
- Post-2008
