= Zimbabwe African National Union – Ndonga =

Political party in Zimbabwe

- Abbreviation: ZANU–Ndonga
- Leader: Denford Musiyarira
- Founder(s): Ndabaningi Sithole
- Founded: 18 March 1975 (51 years, 165 days)
- Split from: ZANU
- Ideology: African nationalism Pan-Africanism; Social democracy
- Political position: Centre-left
- National affiliation: MDC Alliance
- Colours: Green, yellow, red, black

Party flag

Zimbabwe African National Union – Ndonga (ZANU–Ndonga; formerly officially ZANU and unofficially ZANU Mwenje or ZANU Sithole) is a minor political party in Zimbabwe. Its members were originally part of Zimbabwe African National Union, but split with what would become ZANU–PF over tribal tensions. A portion of the party reunified with ZANU-PF in 2015.

== History ==
The Zimbabwe African National Union was a political party during the Rhodesian Bush War, formed as a split from the Zimbabwe African Peoples Union. Its founders were the Reverend Ndabaningi Sithole and Herbert Chitepo, who were dissatisfied with the militant tactics of Nkomo in ZAPU.

After Chitepo's assassination on 18 March 1975, Robert Mugabe, in Mozambique at the time, unilaterally assumed control of ZANU. Later that year there was a factional split along tribal lines caused the Ndebele to follow Sithole into the moderate ZANU–Ndonga party, who renounced violent struggle, while the Shona followed Mugabe with a more militant agenda.

Sithole joined a transitional government of whites and blacks in 1979, led by Bishop Abel Muzorewa. When sanctions remained in place, he joined Muzorewa for the Lancaster House Agreement in London, where a new constitution and elections were prepared. ZANU–Ndonga failed to win any seats in independent elections that swept Mugabe under the ZANU flag to power in 1980.

Declaring that his life was in danger from political enemies, Sithole went into self-imposed exile in the United States city of Silver Spring, Maryland, in 1983, returning to Zimbabwe nine years later to re-enter the political arena.

Sithole was elected a lawmaker for his tribal stronghold of Chipinge in southeastern Zimbabwe in 1995, as was a colleague. In December 1997 he was tried and convicted for conspiring to kill Mugabe and disqualified from attending the Harare parliament. He was granted the right to appeal, but no appeal was filed.

Sithole again won the Chipinge seat in June 2000, as ZANU–Ndonga's only representative. Sithole died on 12 December 2000, aged 80, in Philadelphia, after going there for medical treatment.

ZANU–Ndonga's candidate, Wilson Kumbula, won 1.0% in the March 2002 presidential election. After the parliamentary election held on 31 March 2005, the party remained without parliamentary representation.

Along with three other minor opposition parties, ZANU–Ndonga was a member of the Zimbabwe Organisation of Opposition Political Parties.

In 2015, some leaders of ZANU–Ndonga reunified with ZANU–PF, and called for supporters to "leave the opposition" and join the newly unified party.

== Electoral history ==
=== Presidential elections ===
Election	Party candidate	Votes	%	Result
1996	Ndabaningi Sithole	36,960	2.44%	Lost ✗
2002	Wilson Kumbula	31,368	1.0%	Lost ✗

=== House of Assembly elections ===
Election	Party leader	Votes	%	Seats	+/–	Position	Result
1979	Ndabaningi Sithole	262,928	14.58%	12 / 100		▲2nd	Opposition
1980	Ndabaningi Sithole	53,343	2.01%	0 / 100	▼12	▼5th	Extra-parliamentary
1985	Ndabaningi Sithole	36,054	1.25%	1 / 100	▲1	5th	Opposition
1990	Ndabaningi Sithole	19,448	0.93%	1 / 120	Steady	▲3rd	Opposition
1995	Ndabaningi Sithole	97,470	6.94%	2 / 120	▲1	▲2nd	Opposition
2000	Ndabaningi Sithole	17,823	0.72%	1 / 120	▼1	▼3rd	Opposition
2005	Denford Musiyarira	6,608	0.3%	0 / 150	▼1	3rd	Extra-parliamentary
