= Roy Bennett (politician) =

Zimbabwean politician (1957–2018)

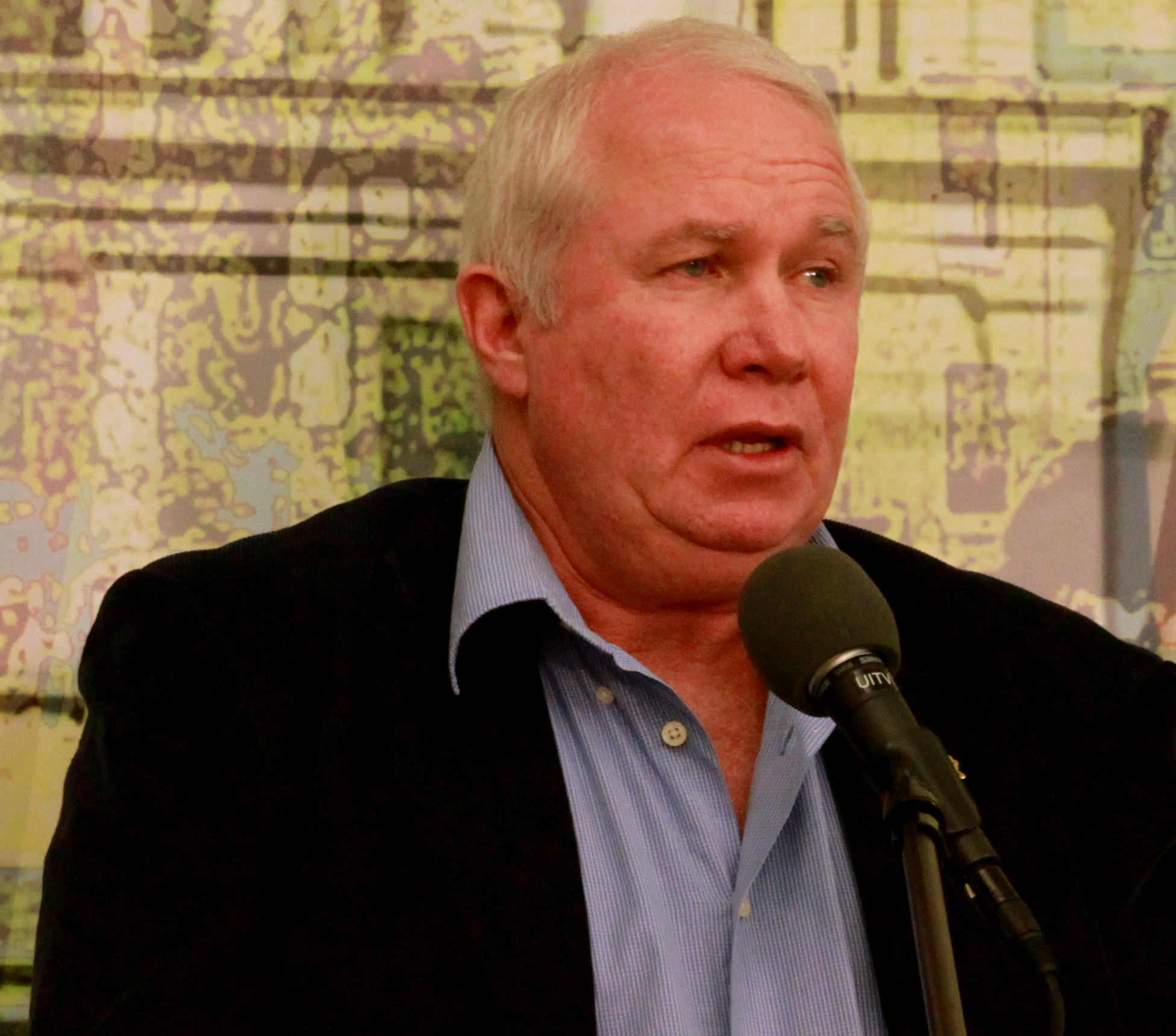

Member of the Senate of Zimbabwe
- President: Robert Mugabe
- Prime Minister: Morgan Tsvangirai

Member of the House of Assembly of Zimbabwe for the seat of Chimanimani
- In office 26 June 2000 – 25 September 2006
- Preceded by: Michael Mataure
- Succeeded by: Samuel Undenge

Personal details
- Born: Roy Leslie Bennett; 16 February 1957 Rusape, Southern Rhodesia
- Died: 17 January 2018 (aged 60) Colfax County, New Mexico, U.S.
- Cause of death: Helicopter crash
- Party: Movement for Democratic Change – Tsvangirai (Treasurer)

Roy Leslie Bennett (16 February 1957 – 17 January 2018) was a Zimbabwean politician and member of the British South Africa Police. He was also a member of the House of Assembly of Zimbabwe for the seat of Chimanimani, where he was affectionately known as Pachedu (loosely translated as "Amongst Us"). He was the Treasurer of the Movement for Democratic Change party led by Morgan Tsvangirai and a member of the Senate of Zimbabwe. He was set to become the Deputy Minister of Agriculture of Zimbabwe until President Robert Mugabe refused to swear him in.

He was one of three white parliamentarians elected in the 2000 Zimbabwean parliamentary election despite the intimidation against MDC voters by supporters of ZANU-PF. During the election campaign, his wife who was three months pregnant, was physically abused by ZANU activists on their farm and subsequently miscarried her baby boy.

== Imprisonment ==
In 2004, during a parliamentary debate in which Justice Minister Patrick Chinamasa was pushing to amend the mandatory three-year sentence for stock theft to nine years, Bennett argued that only because the ZANU-PF government had stolen cattle did they now want to revert to a repressive Rhodesian law. Chinamasa then said:

Mr. Bennett has not forgiven the government for acquiring his farm, but he forgets that his forefathers were thieves and murderers.

Bennett stood up and walked towards Chinamasa, shouting, "Unoda kundijairira iwewe nhai nhai! Unoda kuti ndiite sei?" (Shona: "Don't think you can get away with trying to take advantage of me! What do you want me to do?") Bennett then pushed Chinamasa, who fell to the floor. He was kicked from behind by Anti-Corruption Minister Didymus Mutasa, whom he then unsuccessfully tried to punch. ZANU-PF MP Elliot Manyika reached for a gun in his jacket and threatened Bennett. The Sergeant at Arms escorted Bennett out of the chamber. Deputy Speaker Edna Madzongwe ejected Nelson Chamisa and Willias Madzimure for their involvement in the fight.

The Crisis in Zimbabwe Coalition condemned the actions of Bennett and Chinamasa.

A bill of attainder was then passed. The parliamentary committee investigating the incident, which eventually imprisoned Bennett for 15 months, consisted of three Zanu PF MPs and two MDC MPs. While the MDC MPs vehemently defended Bennett, he was still imprisoned as ZANU-PF had a majority of seats on the committee.

== Release ==
On 28 June 2005, Bennett was released from Chikurubi Prison after spending eight months of his twelve-month sentence in custody. It is standard prison procedure to commute a third of any sentence for good behaviour. He told reporters he had been made to stand naked in front of prison guards and was then given a prison uniform covered with human excrement and lice when he arrived in jail. He denounced prison conditions generally in a press conference after his release, saying, "The inhumanity with which the prisoners are treated and their total lack of recourse to any representation or justice combined with the filth and stench of daily life is something I will never forget and I will not rest until their conditions are improved." Bennett was also scarred by the screams he would hear from other prisoners being beaten on the soles of their feet.

Bennett declared his desire to continue in politics, saying, "I am more determined than ever to continue to strive for a better Zimbabwe for all Zimbabweans, the current oppression cannot continue for much longer and sooner, rather than later, the people will assert their rights." He also said that if the opportunity arose and the people for Chimanimani asked him to, he would stand as their representative again.

== Subsequent developments ==
During the MDC split over the proposed boycott of elections to the Zimbabwe Senate in 2005, Bennett sided with MDC President Morgan Tsvangirai in support of the boycott.

Bennett previously lived in South Africa as a refugee. His application for asylum was initially rejected by the South African Department of Immigration. After a court ruling by the South African Human Rights Commission, his asylum request was accepted on 13 May 2007. During his time in exile, he had an active role in activism for Zimbabwe and particularly the MDC in South Africa. In 2006 he became the treasurer general for the mainstream faction of the MDC led by Morgan Tsvangirai. He was also a spokesman in South Africa and made regular interviews on behalf of the MDC.

During Robert Mugabe's 84th birthday celebrations at the border area of Beitbridge before the 2008 election, Roy Bennett led a demonstration on the South African side of the border against the president:

We are gathered here after many years of suffering, while across the river, after 28 years, a man who is now 84 years old, is having a birthday party. A birthday party while everybody around him is starving and dying. There's no electricity, there are no roads, there are no jobs, there's no education, there's no medical, there's nothing. He is spending 300,000 US dollars to have a birthday party.

== Return ==
At the end of January 2009, after several years in exile, he returned to Zimbabwe to join a debate within the MDC to decide whether or not to agree to the power-sharing government with Mugabe. After the MDC ultimately agreed to share power with ZANU-PF, Morgan Tsvangirai designated Bennett as Deputy Minister of Agriculture on 10 February 2009. On 13 February, he was arrested again while trying to (legally) leave Zimbabwe on a private plane at Charles Prince Airport. He was brought to police stations in Goromonzi and Mutare on that day. He was charged with treason, and the MDC reported that he had been denied food in jail.

Charges were later replaced with those of "conspiring to acquire arms with a view to disrupting essential services". When a magistrate ordered Bennett to be released on remand, the magistrate himself was arrested because "he has passed a judgment that is not popular with the state", and was charged with criminal abuse of office. Bennett was released from prison on bail on 12 March 2009, but was ordered back on 14 October 2009. On 16 October 2009, Judge Hungwe instructed the prison to release Roy Bennett on his old bail conditions.

On Monday 10 May 2010, Roy Bennett was acquitted. On the day of his acquittal, fresh charges were brought against him by CID Law and Order detectives for illegally storing grain. As there were no grounds for these accusations, he was instead charged of perjury and contempt of court. After warrants for his arrest were issued, Roy Bennett lived in exile in South Africa after September 2010.

== Death ==
Roy Bennett and his wife Heather died 17 January 2018 in a helicopter crash in Colfax County, New Mexico, USA.
