= Phillip Chiyangwa =

Zimbabwean politician (born 1959)

Phillip Chowomadzi (born 23 February 1959) is a Zimbabwean politician who has served in the Zimbabwean government. His appointment as the head of Zimbabwe's football association led to controversy and he has been associated with various land disputes.

== Early life ==
Chiyangwa was born in Chinhoyi, to Divaris Makaharis and Marita Mandivenga. He was born in a family of 14. He is a relative of former Zimbabwean president Robert Mugabe.

Phillip attended Chegutu Primary School and completed his higher education at St. Francis Secondary school. He claims to have obtained various professional qualifications from various institutions in Zimbabwe and worldwide. When it comes to some of his tertiary education he attended Universal College in Highfield Harare, he did bookkeeping, elementary, intermediate and advanced certificates. He also did an Advanced Diploma in Accounting.

== Professional life ==
In the 1980s, Chiyangwa embraced entrepreneurship, promoting boxing and music groups, and running a secretarial and accounting agency.

By the 1990s, Chiyangwa owned a tourist complex, a number of manufacturing and engineering companies and was involved in the ownership of Telecel Zimbabwe.

In the 1990s, Chiyangwa became the president of Zimbabwe's Affirmative Action Group.

He continued to amass wealth by setting up Native Africa Investment Ltd. and Midiron Investments. His companies invested in footwear, steel fabrication and metal engineering. He also set up Pinnacle Property Holdings which invested in real estate along with the Phillip Chiyangwa Family Trust.

Chiyangwa's accumulation of wealth has often been associated with his connections to prominent figures within Zanu-PF.

== Political life ==
Chiyangwa is a member of Zanu-PF. He was first elected to Zimbabwe's parliament in the 2000 elections, as the representative for the district of Chinhoyi. In 2004, Chiyangwa was accused of sharing state secrets and charged with breaching the Official Secrets Act. He retained this seat until 2005, when he was removed from the party and prevented from running in the 2005 election.

In 2018, Chiyangwa returned to politics for Zanu-PF and was elected the party's representative for the Zvimba South constituency. He was elected to the National Assembly in the July 30, 2018 elections.

== Wealth & ethics ==
Philip Chiyangwa alleges he owns assets worth US$2.

However it has been reported that Phillip Chiyangwa is the nephew of former Zimbabwean President Robert Mugabe and used this position to access numerous opportunities and wealth.

== Football controversy ==
Chiyangwa leveraged this influence to become ZIFA President. Although Chiyangwa maintains visibility over social media, Zimbabwe was banned from the World Cup over ZIFA’s failure to honour payments to coaching staff.

Zimbabwe has also since failed to qualify for any major international competitions under Chinyangwa’s tenure. Board members of ZIFA resigned en masse alleging Chiyangwa’s “capture” of the organisation and poor and non-productive management style.

In 2016 he was elected unopposed as President of the Council of Southern Africa Football Associations (COSAFA) during the organisation’s Annual General Meeting held at Sun City, South Africa.

Chiyangwa has been implicated in making false representations of his status in FIFA and embezzlement of funds up to $2 million

Chiyangwa claims to have secured the role of campaign manager of the Madagascan football chief, Ahmad Ahmad in Ahmad’s campaign for CAF presidency against disgraced Issa Hayatou, who faced allegations of major fraud and corruption, and was eventually voted out Chiyangwa announced to the press that he was instrumental in this effort and is FIFA’s Hatchet Man.

Chiyangwa was formally accused of corruption, fraud and embezzlement by ZIFA with a legal claim filed citing that he stripped the organisation of considerable assets and diverted these funds for his own personal use and gain.

In 2019, the Zimbabwe Football Association banned Chiyangwa for life for "bringing Zimbabwean football into disrepute".

== Personal life ==
In 1986, Chiyangwa and Elizabeth Jama were married in community, with their marriage solidified in 1988 through the courts. The couple had two children, Ellen Vanessa (born 1986) and Mitchelle Martha (born 1989). In 2013, Elizabeth filed for divorce. The divorce was finalized in 2018.

In 1993, Saniso Katerere claims she and Chiyangwa were married in community. As of 2020, they were in the process of divorce.

Chiyangwa's other children include sons Edmund, Bruce and Brian.

== See also ==
- Politics of Zimbabwe
