= Chipinge North =

Chipinge North is a constituency in southeastern Zimbabwe in the province of Manicaland near the Mozambique border. It is named after Chipinge town.
