= Trudy Stevenson =

Zimbabwean politician

Member of Parliament for Harare North
- In office 2000–2008

Ambassador to Senegal and The Gambia
- In office 2008–2018

Personal details
- Born: Lottie Gertrude Bevier; 16 September 1944 Atlanta, Georgia, U.S.
- Died: 24 August 2018 (aged 73) Dakar, Senegal
- Education: Wymondham College; University of Reading; University of Zimbabwe

Lottie Gertrude Stevenson (née Bevier; 16 September 1944 – 24 August 2018) was a Zimbabwean ambassador and politician. She was a member of parliament for Harare North in the Parliament of Zimbabwe. She was also a founding member of the Movement for Democratic Change (MDC) of Zimbabwe, the first white woman to be voted into the MDC National Executive and, during her tenure, the country's only white female Member of Parliament.

== Early life ==
Stevenson was born in Atlanta, Georgia in the United States, and attended school at Wymondham College in England from 1955 to 1962. She obtained a BA degree (French and Italian, joint honours) from the University of Reading and a Graduate Certificate in Education from the University of Zimbabwe. She lived in Uganda during the 1970s, before fleeing from the regime of Idi Amin. She moved to Zimbabwe in 1980, and became a Zimbabwean citizen in 1990.

== Career ==
Stevenson held the position of Member of Parliament for Harare North from 2000 to 2008. She also served as MDC's national secretary for Policy and Research for both the original MDC and in a smaller faction of the MDC. She was quoted as saying "Mugabe does not frighten me, I feel it is my duty to stand up for the rights of all."

Stevenson was the chairperson of the Combined Harare Residents Association, and led the organisation's Supreme Court request for municipal elections in the city following the dissolution of the Harare City Council by the Ministry for Local Government due to corruption. The government-appointed city commissioners, initially appointed for a period of six months, were still in place two years later. The approach was successful, however before elections could be organised, President Mugabe declared that the city elections would be held simultaneously with the 2002 presidential elections. As a result of the short time frame for preparations the elections were chaotic and many eligible voters were not able to vote. Nevertheless, the organisation considered their actions a success as they had forced the government to approve elections in the city.

In 2005, Stevenson and several supporters left the MDC due to the increasingly violent tactics of Morgan Tsvangirai, the movement's leader and founder. She joined a breakaway faction led by former student activist Arthur Mutambara.

In July 2006, after attending a political meeting in the Harare suburb of Mabvuku, Stevenson and four political colleagues were attacked by a mob. Stevenson suffered panga wounds to the back of her neck and head, broken arm and wrist bones and a fractured cheek bone. The leadership of the rival faction of the MDC immediately claimed that the attack was carried out by ZANU militants. However, while recovering in the hospital, Stevenson positively identified her assailants as members of the MDC-T faction, led by Tsvangirai. Timothy Mubawu, a MDC Member of Parliament, was later charged with organising the attack.

== Later career and death ==
In 2009, Stevenson was appointed as Zimbabwean Ambassador to Senegal and The Gambia, and was responsible for re-opening Zimbabwe's embassy in Senegal. She held the post even after the fall of the inclusive government in 2013.

Stevenson was found dead by her chauffeur at her Dakar, Senegal residence on 24 August 2018.

== Personal life ==
Stevenson was the daughter of First Lieutenant Gilbert Hasbrouck Bevier Jr. (1924–1946), who was born in Kingston, New York and died suspiciously of a gunshot wound in Seoul, South Korea. He enlisted in the United States Army Air Force in May 1942, while a freshman at Rutgers University, and served during World War II. He was a descendant of seven of the New Paltz, New York patentees, or founders, including Louis DuBois (Huguenot). Her mother was Ann Elizabeth Jarrell of Georgia. She had a brother, Frank Hasbrouck Bevier.

In July 1965, she married Stuart Robert Stevenson, of Hailsham, England, in Surrey, England. They had three children: Neil Robert, Catherine Bevier and Alexander Graham Stevenson.
