= Forum Party =

- Leader: Enoch Dumbutshena
- Founded: 28 March 1993
- Preceded by: Conservative Alliance of Zimbabwe
- Merged into: Movement for Democratic Change
- Headquarters: Harare
- Ideology: Conservatism
- Political position: Centre-right

The Forum Party of Zimbabwe (FPZ) was a centre-right conservative political party in Zimbabwe.

The Forum Party was formed on 28 March 1993 and was led by a former Zimbabwean Chief Justice Enoch Dumbutshena. It was formed by a merger of the Forum for Democratic Reform (Trust), which Dumbutshena had led, and the Open Forum. One of its other predecessors was the Conservative Alliance of Zimbabwe which had been led by former Rhodesian Prime Minister Ian Smith. Smith had chaired a meeting in 1992 hoping to unite opposition groups of all races against Mugabe's government.

The party called for powers to be devolved to the provinces and government expenditure to be cut, for instance by cutting the number of cabinet ministers from 43 to 14. The party soon became the biggest of the opposition parties, and analysts saw it as a serious threat to the dominance of the Zimbabwe African National Union – Patriotic Front.

However, by the 1995 parliamentary elections the party was suffering from internal divisions, with a breakaway group forming a rival Forum Party for Democracy. The party stood only 28 candidates in the 1995 elections and failed to gain any seats, winning 5.9% of the vote.

The party merged into the Movement for Democratic Change in December 1999.
