= Chipinge South =

Parliamentary constituency in Zimbabwe

Coordinates: 20°32′37″S 32°22′18″E

- Constituency for the National Assembly of Zimbabwe
- Province: Manicaland
- Region: Chipinge District

Current constituency
- Seats: 1
- Party: Citizens Coalition for Change
- Member(s): Clifford Hlatywayo

Chipinge South is a constituency of the National Assembly of the Parliament of Zimbabwe, located in Manicaland Province. Its current MP since the 2023 general election is Clifford Hlatywayo of the Citizens Coalition for Change.

== History ==
In the 2018 general election, Enock Porusingazi of ZANU–PF was elected to represent the constituency.

== See also ==
- List of Zimbabwean parliamentary constituencies
