= Enoch Dumbutshena =

Zimbabwean judge

Chief Justice of Zimbabwe
- In office 1984–1990

Personal details
- Born: 25 April 1920 Southern Rhodesia
- Died: 14 December 2000 (aged 80) Zimbabwe
- Party: Forum Party

Enoch Dumbutshena (25 April 1920 – 14 December 2000) was a Zimbabwean judge known for defending the independence of that country's judicial branch. He became Zimbabwe's first black judge in 1980 and served as Chief Justice of Zimbabwe from 1984 to 1990. Dumbutshena's decisions were often highly critical of President Robert Mugabe and his government. A former member of the International Commission of Jurists, he unsuccessfully attempted to launch a political career of his own in 1993 by founding the free-market Forum Party. He died in late 2000 of liver cancer.

== Legal career ==
He was in private practice in Salisbury and Lusaka until 1980, when he became Zimbabwe's first black High Court Judge. He famously acquitted a group of six white Zimbabwe Air Force officers who had been tortured into confessing to participation in the sabotage of fighter aircraft.

== Character ==
Lord Denning described Dumbutshena J as "a much-respected figure, courageous and independent as a judge should be." He was a member of the African National Congress, and was refused a passport to travel to the US “due to prevailing conditions” in 1959. [Source: “African Journalist Refused Passport to America,” Contact, 18 April 1959.]
