= 2000 Zimbabwean parliamentary election =

- 24–25 June 2000

120 of the 150 seats in the House of Assembly of Zimbabwe
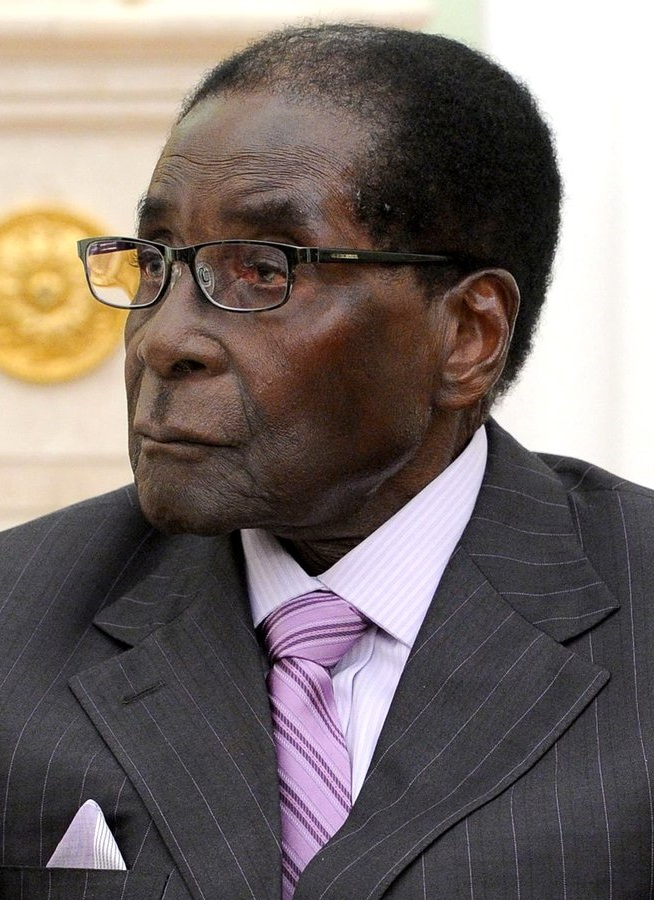

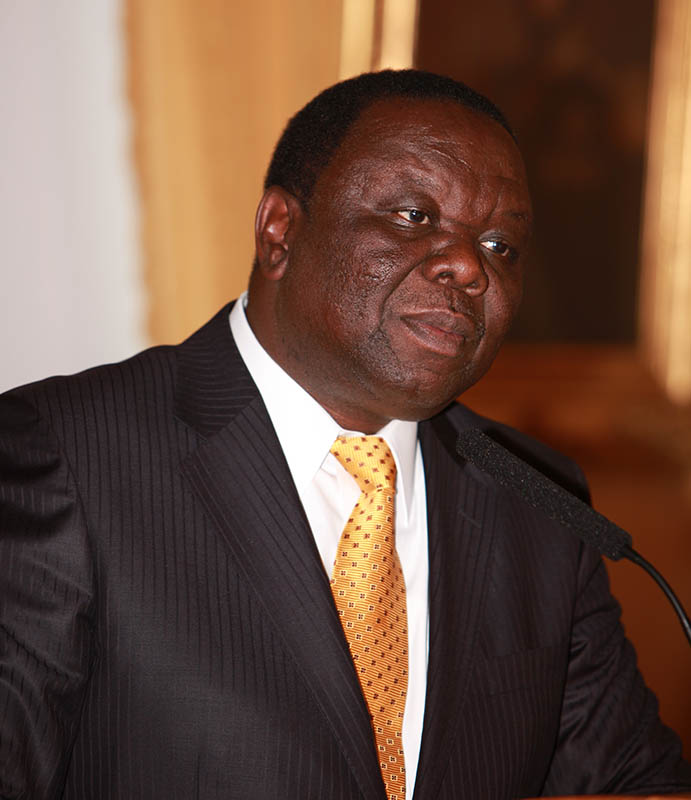
	Majority party	Minority party
Leader	Robert Mugabe	Morgan Tsvangirai
Party	ZANU–PF	MDC
Last election	118 seats	–
Seats won	62	57
Seat change	▼56	New
Popular vote	1,207,298	1,166,653
Percentage	48.47%	46.84%
- Results by constituency

Parliamentary elections were held in Zimbabwe on 24 and 25 June 2000 to elect members of the House of Assembly. The electoral system involved 120 constituencies returning one member each, elected by the first-past-the-post system, with the president nominating 20 members and ten tribal chiefs sitting ex officio. This was the first national election in which Zimbabwe's ruling ZANU–PF party had faced any real opposition since the 1980s, with the newly formed Movement for Democratic Change (MDC) challenging their control of parliament.

ZANU–PF won 62 seats with 48% of the popular vote, while the MDC won 57 of the 120 elected seats with 47% of the popular vote. The performance of the MDC was described as "unexpectedly strong", given the unfair conduct of the election by the Mugabe regime.

According to international observers, the elections were marred by extensive electoral fraud and intimidation of voters. Political violence increased during the month of June, resulting in thousands of unsolved murders and abductions.

== Results ==
Graph of the party split among 120 seats.
Party	Votes	%	Seats
ZANU–PF	1,207,298	48.47	62
Movement for Democratic Change	1,166,653	46.84	57
United Parties	18,606	0.75	0
ZANU–Ndonga	17,823	0.72	1
Zimbabwe African People's Union	11,331	0.45	0
Zimbabwe Union of Democrats	6,201	0.25	0
Liberty Party	1,441	0.06	0
Liberal Party of Zimbabwe	1,394	0.06	0
Zimbabwe Integrated Programme	433	0.02	0
National Democratic Union	164	0.01	0
Zimbabwe Progressive Party	62	0.00	0
Zimbabwe Congress Party	16	0.00	0
Independents	59,191	2.38	0
Total	2,490,613	100.00	120
Valid votes	2,490,613	97.43	
Invalid/blank votes	65,648	2.57	
Total votes	2,556,261	100.00	
Registered voters/turnout	5,288,804	48.33	
Source: ZESN

=== By constituency ===
Harare Province

1. BUDIRIRO: Gilbert Mutimutema Shoko (MDC) 21,058; Gladys Hokoyo (ZANU (PF)) 4,410; Nyorovai Tafaranarwo (UP) 96; Aaron Magama (Ind) 93.
2. CHITUNGWIZA: Fidelis Mhashu (MDC) 15,480; Endy Mhlanga (ZANU (PF)) 6,057; Mhonda Tahwinei Chitongo (NDU) 164; Chiwetu Nyika (UP) 101.
3. DZIVARASEKWA: Edwin Mushoriwa (MDC) 18,516; Omega Hungwe (ZANU (PF)) 6,083; Wailes Chapariza Nyaguhwa (Ind) 584; Paddington Japajapa (Ind) 173; Edson Wadyehwata (Ind) 122; Nyasha Chikoore (UP) 120.
4. GLEN NORAH: Priscilla Misihairambwi (MDC) 17,866; Thomas Magwirokona Mapanzure (ZANU (PF)) 3,517; Jonathan Marimbire (UP) 159; Nogget Martha Muchenje (ZUD) 147; Davison Mandega (ZANU (Ndonga)) 119; Admire Denenga (Ind) 0.
5. GLEN VIEW: Paul Madzorere (MDC) 16,470; Sabina Mangwende (ZANU (PF)) 3,443; Clive Makusha Chimbi (Ind) 209; Netsai Godwin Matambirwa (UP) 100; Fatima Mbizi (ZUD) 48; Pearson Musakwa (ZCP) 16.
6. HARARE EAST: Tendai Laxton Biti (MDC) 18,129; Stalin Maumau (ZANU (PF)) 4,391; Heneri Dzinotyyiwei (ZIP) 140.
7. HARARE CENTRAL: Michael Theodore Hayes Auret (MDC) 14,207; Winston Dzawo (ZANU (PF)) 3,620; Obey Mudzingwa (Ind) 76; Charles David Mukome (UP) 39.
8. HARARE NORTH: Getrude Bavier Lottie Stevenson (MDC) 18,976; Nyasha Chikwinya (ZANU (PF)) 4,852; Nhamo Chester Mhende (Ind) 707; Justin Chiota (ZPP) 222; Lily Angela Anne Murapa (Ind) 202.
9. HARARE SOUTH: Gabriel Chaibva (MDC) 12,430; Vivian Mwashita (ZANU (PF)) 4,730; Margaret Dongo (ZUD) 951; Fisher Albert Aldridge Timothy (Ind) 0.
10. HATFIELD: Tapiwa Mashakada (MDC) 11,740; Irene Zindi (ZANU (PF)) 5,413; David Farai Muzorewa (UP) 124; Dambudzo Frank Heart Jangano (Ind) 111; Mike Nedi Duro (Ind MDC) 62; Tafadzwa Abel Savanhu (Ind) 58; White Robson (Ind) 39; Tarupiwa Conrad (Ind) 0.
11. HIGHFIELD: Munyaradzi Gwisai (MDC) 12,616; Ida Mashonganyika (ZANU (PF)) 3,234; Richard Shambambeva-Nyandoro (Ind) 1,120; Phillip Zulu (UP) 185; Shakespeare Mudzingwa (ZUD) 139.
12. KAMBUZUMA: Willias Madzimure (MDC) 13,722; Oliver Chidwao (ZANU (PF)) 2,542; Jaison Chandavengerwa Munyki (UP) 101; Kingstone Dutiro (Ind) 77; Charles Mushore Manyonga (Ind) 77; Jane Madzongwe (ZUD) 74.
13. KUWADZANA: Learnmore Jongwe (MDC) 15,691; Clifford Mumbengegwi (ZANU (PF)) 4,349; Zebron Chawaipira (Ind) 155; Henry Struck Mahlangu (ZANU (Ndonga)) 144; Elizabeth Masvikenyi (UP) 67; Mathias Kufandimbwa (Ind) 0.
14. MABVUKU: Justin Mutendadzamera (MDC) 17,495; Pamela Tungamirai (ZANU (PF)) 5,572; Mukandira Raphael (UP) 264.
15. MBARE EAST: Tichaona Jephta Munyanyi (MDC) 10,754; Tony Gara (ZANU (PF)) 4,265; Robert Godfrey Musasiwa (Ind) 232; Stephen Guvira (ZUD) 109.
16. MBARE WEST: Donemore Sasi Makuvaza (MDC) 13,118; Tendai Savanhu (ZANU (PF)) 3,078; Agnes Muremberi (Ind) 312; Verna Chitumba (UP) 88.
17. MUFAKOSE: Paurina Mpariwa (MDC) 15,233; Sabina Zvenando Thembani (ZANU (PF)) 3,965; Lovemore Chenai Moyo Mutete (UP) 350.
18. ST MARY: Job Sikhala (MDC) 17,740; Christopher Pasipamire (ZANU (PF)) 6,135.
19. ZENGEZA: Tafadzwa Basilo Musekiwa (MDC) 14,814; Christopher Chikavanga Chigumba (ZANU (PF)) 5,330; Evelyn Chimwaya (ZANU (Ndonga)) 172; Gideon Chinoyerei (PDF) 90.
  Bulawayo Province
20. BULAWAYO NORTH EAST: Welshman Ncube (MDC) 21,100; Joshua Malinga (ZANU (PF)) 2,864; Sikhumbuzo Ncube (ZAPU) 227; Arnold Payne (Ind) 87; Eliakimo Ncube (Liberty Party) 37.
21. BULAWAYO SOUTH: David Coltart (MDC) 20,781;Callistus Ndlovu (ZANU (PF)) 3,193; Charles Mpofu (Ind) 281; Done Dhlmini (ZAPU) 34; Shadreck Ndlovu (UP) 25.
22. PELANDABA: Jeffrey Khumalo (MDC) 16,462; Edward Simela (ZANU (PF)) 2,696; Stephen Nkomo (ZAPU) 270; Victor Chipanga (UP) 57; Canaan Zinothi Moyo (Liberty Party of Zimbabwe) 54; Jele Ndimande (Liberty Party) 35.
23. PUMULA-LUVEVE: Esafu Mdhlongwa (MDC) 18,901; Norman Zikhali (ZANU (PF)) 3,020; Jethro Mkwananzi (ZAPU) 263; Zakhele Mpofu (Ind) 127; Jeremiah Michael Ndlovu (UP) 61; Beauty Sidambe (LPZ) 53; Elizabeth Mudanda (LP) 50.
24. MAKOKOBA: Thokozani Khuphe (MDC) 12,901; Sithembiso Nyoni (ZANU (PF)) 2,196; Matson Hlalo (Ind) 1,773; Mutandazo Ndlovu (ZAPU) 113; Thokozile Mbewe (LPZ) 43; Rachel Munetsi (UP) 34.
25. MPOPOMA: Milton Gwetu (MDC) 14 813; Sikanyiso Ndlovu (ZANU (PF)) 2,540; Paul Siwela (ZAPU) 146; Rachal Mpala (Liberty Party) 83.
26. LOBENGULA: Fletcher Dulini (MDC) 17,041; Isaac Nyathi (ZANU (PF)) 2,197; Elliot Dube (ZAPU) 177; Florence Ndebele (LPZ) 119; Stephen Mpofu (Ind) 60; Joshua Mgutshini (LP) 32.
27. NKULUMANE: Gibson Sibanda (MDC) 20,380; Dumiso Dabengwa (ZANU (PF)) 3,644; Mike Parira Mpofu (Ind) 417; Mqondobanzi Progress Nduna Magonya (ZAPU) 205; Shortie Ncube (UP) 63; Mandhlaenkosi Nkala (LPZ) 36; Ernerst Moyo (Ind) 25; Twoboy Jubane (Liberty Party) 18.
  Mashonaland East
28. SEKE: Tumbare Mutasa (MDC) 10,821; Phineas Chihota (ZANU (PF)) 9,236; Beta Zvanyanya Dongo (ZUD) 2,047; Peter Mashumba (Ind MDC) 703; Abraham Mombeshora (Ind MDC) 388; Gerald Mubaira (Ind) 320; Ronald Sadomba (UP) 133.
29. MARONDERA WEST: Rufaro Gwanzura (ZANU (PF)) 11,221; Shadreck Chipangura (MDC) 4,570; John Tsimba (Ind) 728; Ernest Shora (ZUD) 0.
30. MARONDERA EAST: Sydney Sekeramayi (ZANU (PF)) 10,692; Didymus Munenzva (MDC) 10,629; Sekai Tungai (UP) 248; Pascal Dangwa (Ind) 205.
31. CHIKOMBA: Chenjerai Hunzvi (ZANU (PF)) 13,417; Peter Kaunda (MDC) 6,776; Moses Jiri (UP) 362; Julia Kunzekwenyika (Ind) 161; Leticia Mujeyi (ZIP) 103; Charles Patrick (Ind) 0.
32. UZUMBA MARAMBA PFUNGWE: Kenneth Mutiwokuziva (ZANU (PF)) 27,748; Bonomali Marere (MDC) 2,128; Moses Madakuenda (UP) 560.
33. MUREHWA NORTH: Victor Chitongo (ZANU (PF)) 13,694; Musarurwa Mudzingwa (MDC) 4,104; Josiah Mujuru (UP) 461.
34. MUREHWA SOUTH: Joel Biggie Matiza (ZANU (PF)) 13,895; Ward Nezi (MDC) 4,426; Edson Chiwara (UP) 505.
35. MUTOKO SOUTH: Olivia Muchena (ZANU (PF)) 19,228; Derek Muzira (MDC) 1,177; Patrick Chabvamuperu (Ind) 627; David Mahachi (UP) 129.
36. MUDZI: Ray Joseph Kaukonde (ZANU (PF)) 27,149; Israel Karonga (MDC) 2,371; Simon Chikazi (UP) 690.
37. MUTOKO NORTH: David Chapfika (ZANU (PF)) 17,374; Gents Chinomona (MDC) 2,447; Leon Chiimba (UP) 372.
38. GOROMONZI: Herbert Murerwa (ZANU (PF)) 14,459; Leonard Chiutsi Mapuranga (MDC) 9,489; David Chikaka (Ind MDC) 1,102; Nyembesi Musanduri (UP) 319.
39. HWEDZA: Aeneas Chigwedere (ZANU (PF)) 18,044; Pearson Tachiveyi (MDC) 6,049; Catherine Kafunda (UP) 351; Wilson Muzondo (Ind) 161.
  Mashonaland West
40. CHINHOYI: Phillip Chiyangwa (ZANU (PF)) 8,176; Silas Matamisa (MDC) 7,602; Eugene Nyahundi (UP) 99.
41. ZVIMBA NORTH: Ignatius Chombo (ZANU (PF)) 16,175; Hamilton Gomba (MDC) 5,872; William Chirambasukwa (Ind) 0.
42. ZVIMBA SOUTH: Sabina Mugabe (ZANU (PF)) 16,508; Titus Nheya (MDC) 4,689; Forgiveness Pasimupindu Manika (Ind) 2,195; Chipembere Muzondiwa (UP) 334.
43. MHONDORO: Hilda Mafudze (MDC) 10,783; Mavis Chidzonga (ZANU (PF)) 9,118; Shakespeare Maya (Ind) 1,210; Titus Mukarati (UP) 543.
44. KADOMA WEST: Zachariah Urayayi Ziyambi (ZANU (PF)) 11,758; Edward Ngoma (MDC) 4,581; Chikomborero Dhliwayo (ZUD) 451; Stephen Manyange (UP) 373.
45. KADOMA EAST: Munyaradzi Paul Mangwana (ZANU (PF)) 11,678; Richard Emmanuel Moyo (MDC) 3,362.
46. KADOMA CENTRAL: Austin Wilson Mupandawana (MDC) 12,049; Israel Mukwesha (ZANU (PF)) 5,666; John Zhoya (UP) 166.
47. CHEGUTU: Charles Ndlovu (ZANU (PF)) 12,169; Philemon Thambatshira (MDC) 10,412; Shadreck Karuwa (UP) 485; Cleopas Sibanda (Ind) 0.
48. MAKONDE: Swithun Mombeshora (ZANU (PF)) 13,066; Robert Ruzivo (MDC) 3,294; Casper Masikini (UP) 728.
49. KARIBA: Isaac Mackenie (ZANU (PF)) 15,048; Lucas Gombe Sigobole (MDC) 7,332; Cephas Duwira Ndoro-Mazasi (UP) 560.
50. HURUNGWE EAST: Reuben Marumahoko (ZANU (PF)) 14,814; Richard Chaza (MDC) 4,415; Council Nziramasanga (NPA) 617.
51. HURUNGWE WEST: Mark Madiro (ZANU (PF)) 18,931; Tsvangwa Kanhema (MDC) 4,532; Luckson Shereni Magara (UP) 929.
  Mashonaland Central
52. SHAMVA: Nicholas Tasunungurwa Goche (ZANU (PF)) 19,460; Joseph Mashinya (MDC) 5,621.
53. MAZOWE WEST: Christopher Tachiona Kuruneri (ZANU (PF)) 14,024; Biggie Township Chigonero (MDC) 7,085; Florence Chimunda (Ind) 414.
54. MAZOWE EAST: Chenhamo Chimutingwende (ZANU (PF)) 18,824; Shepherd Leonard Mushonga (MDC) 7,473; Gibson Madombwe (UP) 533.
55. BINDURA: Border Gezi (ZANU (PF)) 13,328; Elliot Pfebve (MDC) 11,257; Florence Mudyavanhu (UP) 334.
56. MOUNT DARWIN NORTH: Joyce Mujuru (ZANU (PF)) 20,629; Ephraim Hondo Pfebe (MDC) 2,037; John Fanuel Dzvingwa (ZANU (Ndonga)) 717; Derry John Katimba (UP) 411.
57. MOUNT DARWIN SOUTH: Saviour Kasukuwere (ZANU (PF)) 22,733; Godfrey Donnie Mumbamarwo (MDC) 2,295; Michael Gomo (UP) 406.
58. GURUVE NORTH: Paul Mazikana (ZANU (PF)) 20,513; Allan McCormick (MDC) 2,370; Margaret Chagadama (UP) 668.
59. GURUVE SOUTH: Edward Chindori-Chininga (ZANU (PF)) 19,988; Gift Chimankire (MDC) 3,239.
60. RUSHINGA: Lazarus Dokora (ZANU (PF)) 20,027; Joel Mugariri (MDC) 2,438; Michael Chin'ono (UP) 439.
61. MUZARABANI: Nobbie Dzinzi (ZANU (PF)) 19,441; Timoth Mukwengwe (MDC) 3,727.
  Manicaland
62. BUHERA NORTH: Kenneth Vhundukai Manyonda (ZANU (PF)) 12,850; Morgan Tsvangirai (MDC) 10,316.
63. BUHERA SOUTH: Kumbirai Manyika Kangai (ZANU (PF)) 14,016; Stephen Seven Maambire (MDC) 7,821.
64. CHIMANIMANI: Roy Leslie Bennett (MDC) 11,410; Munacho Thomas Mutezo (ZANU (PF)) 8,072; Hardwell Dumisani Kundhlande (ZANU (Ndonga)) 543.
65. CHIPINGE SOUTH: Tarugarira Wilson Khumbula (ZANU (Ndonga)) 10,248; Enock Porusingazi (ZANU (PF)) 4,086; Elijah Magaa (MDC) 3,283; Piko Hlahla (Ind) 182.
66. CHIPINGE NORTH: Messias Matewu (MDC) 9,283; Gideon Chinosara Goko (ZANU (PF)) 3,728; Vesta Zvamwaida Sithole (ZANU (Ndonga)) 2,925; Margie Mungwari (ZUD) withdrawn.
67. MAKONI EAST: Tongesayi Shadreck Chipanga (ZANU (PF)) 7,509; Nicholas Mudzengere (MDC) 7,391; Phineas Nyagura (UP) 212.
68. MAKONI NORTH: Didymus Noel Edwin Mutasa (ZANU (PF)) 14,835; Valentine Tinodyanavo Ziswa (MDC) 3,357; Elton Steers Mangoma (Ind ZIP) 1,330.
69. MAKONI WEST: Moven Enock Mahachi (ZANU (PF)) 11,138; Elisha Remus Makuwaza (MDC) 7,356; Abel Tendekai Muzorewa (UP) 923; Egypt Dzinemunenzva (ANP) 862.
70. MUTARE CENTRAL: Innocent Tinashe Gonese (MDC) 17,706; Christopher Peter Chingosho (ZANU (PF)) 3,091; Patrick Chitaka (Ind) 985; Felix Murimi (Ind) 754; Moses Jackson Mvenge (Ind) 324; Munhu Haashati Naison Sithole (ZANU (Ndonga)) 83.
71. MUTARE NORTH: Giles Mutsekwa (MDC) 15,500; Oppah Chamu Zvipange Muchinguri (ZANU (PF)) 5,564; Justin Nyatoti (UP) 235.
72. MUTARE SOUTH: Sydney Mukwecheni (MDC) 7,273; Michael MADIRO (ZANU (PF)) 6,673; Lazarus Gumisai Nzarayebani (Ind) 637; Washington Pfupajena (Ind) 238; Denniford Musiyarira (ZANU (Ndonga)) 218.
73. MUTARE WEST: Christopher Mushowe (ZANU (PF)) 11,498; Tambaoga Nyazika (MDC) 5,818; Shepherd Mkwekwezeke (Ind) 622; Tobias Nemasasi (Ind) 341.
74. MUTASA: Evelyn Masaiti (MDC) 9,278; Mandi Mandiita Wepi Chimene (ZANU (PF)) 5,281; Noah Chitungo (UP) 268; Abel Samanga (ZUD) 262; Dzawanda John Nyamunda (Ind) 0.
75. NYANGA: Leonard Ringisai Chirewamangu (MDC) 10,016; Paul Kadzima (ZANU (PF)) 8,891; David Cozai Hamunakwadi (UP) 701.
  Midlands
76. GOKWE SOUTH: Jaison Machaya (ZANU (PF)) 12,644; Lameck Muyambi (MDC) 3,615; Witness Foyo (Ind ZANU (PF)) 1,490.
77. GWERU RURAL': Renson Gasela (MDC) 10,190; Makumucha Mbulawa (ZANU (PF)) 6,889; Similo Moyo (LPZ) 264; Canaan Moyo (Liberty Party of Zimbabwe) 0.
78. GWERU URBAN: Timothy Lancaster Mukahlera (MDC) 12,172; Richard Chemist Hove (ZANU (PF)) 3,877; Ruyedzo Mutizwa (Ind) 1,019; Sylvester Bennard Mutesera (UP) 117.
79. KWEKWE: Blessing Chebundo (MDC) 15,388; Emmerson Dambudzo Mnangagwa (ZANU (PF)) 8,352; Milton Chinamasa (Ind) 227; Cuthbert Mwenye Chidava (UP) 176.
80. ZHOMBE: Daniel Mackenzie Ncube (ZANU (PF)) 10,757; Anna Mtisi (MDC) 8,165; Gibson Dhuza (UP) 539; Albert Charles Moyo Madambe (Ind) 386; Ganagana Wilbroad (Ind) 0.
81. ZVISHAVANE: Pearson Meeting Mbalekwa (ZANU (PF)) 13,971; Farai Maruzane (MDC) 10,373; Misheck Hogwe (Ind) 1,028; Emmie Ncube (UP) 256.
82. MBERENGWA EAST: Rugare Gumbo (ZANU (PF)) 23,595; Sekai Holland (MDC) 3,117.
83. MBERENGWA WEST: Jorum Gumbo (ZANU (PF)) 18,315; Mufandaedza Hove (MDC) 3,889; Lyton Shumba (Ind) 968; Edwin Nyathi (Ind) 667.
84. CHIRUMANZU: Innocent Wilson Chikiyi (ZANU (PF)) 10,708; Gideon Makumbe (MDC) 5,185; Chawawona Wilbroad Kanoti (Ind) 1,052; Edward Mhaka Chiropa (UP) 238.
85. GOKWE CENTRAL: Lovemore Mupukuta (ZANU (PF)) 11,082; Edson Nyathi (MDC) 5,987; Ernest Nkomazana (Ind) 436; Pio Poteredzai Paraffin (Ind) 364; Christopher Sibindi (Ind) 0; Samson Muchimwe (Ind) 0.
86. GOKWE NORTH: Elick Mkandla (ZANU (PF)) 15,923; Sibangani Malandu (MDC) 3,967; Javen Chibendure (ZUD) 1,152; Timothy Mpofu (UP) 360.
87. GOKWE EAST: Flora Bhuka (ZANU (PF)) 17,088; Timothy Madzori (MDC) 3,674; Clever Gombo (Ind) 1,202; Fiso Sibindi (Ind) 738; Silas Makuva Mutendi (Ind) 2,534; William Muzenda (ZUD) 619.
88. GOKWE WEST: Esther Nyauchi (ZANU (PF)) 14,956; Edgar Sithole (MDC) 3,240; Colleen Nyoni (ZUD) 0.
89. MKOBA: Stanley Bethel Makwembere (MDC) 14,587; Federick Shava (ZANU (PF)) 4,840; Lot Macharaga (ZUD) 1,011; Alois Matsika Mudhavanhu (ZIP) 72; John Samubvu (Ind) 64; Maxwell Mupukuta (UP) 0.
90. SHURUGWI: Francis Nhema (ZANU (PF)) 14,891; Lucia Gladys Matinenga (MDC) 6,524; Maria Stella Rusere (ZUP) 523.
91. SILOBELA: Abednico Mathe Malinga (MDC) 15,985; Tommy Moyo (ZANU (PF)) 5,848; Godfrey Viki (ZAPU) 481; Priscilla Mangena (UP) 393.
  Masvingo
92. BIKITA EAST: Walter Mutsauri (ZANU (PF)) 7,047; Edmore Marima (MDC) 5,015; Mathew Makaza (Ind MDC) 212; Julias Chapungu (Ind) 0.
93. BIKITA WEST: Amos Munyaradzi Mutongi (MDC) 7,726; Rtd. Col. Cladius William Makova (ZANU (PF)) 7,441.
94. CHIREDZI NORTH: Elliot Marilele Chauke (ZANU (PF)) 10,154; Moses Mare (MDC) 8,674; Abel Peter Miller (ZANU (Ndonga)) 530.
95. CHIREDZI SOUTH: Aaron Baloyi (ZANU (PF)) 11,611; Patrick Mapengo,(MDC) 6,414; Joel Kenneth Sithole (ZANU (Ndonga)) 794.
96. CHIVI NORTH: Samuel Creighton Mbengegwi (ZANU (PF)) 10,947; Bennard Chiondengwa (MDC) 3,938; Albert Meke, alias Chamwadoro (Ind) 3,762.
97. CHIVI SOUTH: Charles Majange (ZANU (PF)) 12,056; Alex Elias Mashamhanda (MDC) 4,312; Paradza Mandebvu (Ind) 1,683; Lawson Mapfaire, alias Sithole (Ind MDC) 0.
98. GUTU NORTH: Simon Vengai Murefu Muzenda (ZANU (PF)) 14,867; Chrispen Zvouno Musoni (MDC) 8,179; Tirivanhu Fanuwere Mufandaedza (UP) 678.
99. GUTU SOUTH: Shuvai Mahofa (ZANU (PF)) 11,434; Rensom Makamure (MDC) 6,606; Vengai Greeley Guni (Ind) 3,070; Jefta Abraham Mukombe (Ind) 1,200; Luckmore Masarira (Ind) 843; Gracious Zinyeka (Ind MDC) 84; Cyprene Jacob Matanga (UP) 25.
100. MASVINGO CENTRAL: Silas Joseph Man'ono (MDC) 12,417; Dzikamai Calisto Mavhaire (ZANU (PF)) 8,023; Kudzai Savious Mbudzi (Ind) 314; Mbengo Nason Mhlanga (ZANU (Ndonga)) 0; Ray Muzanda (Ind MDC) 0.
101. MASVINGO NORTH: Gorerazvo Stan Mudenge (ZANU (PF)) 8,146; Joseph Mutema (MDC) 7,224; Sylvester Beji (Ind) 1,050.
102. MASVINGO SOUTH: Edson Jonasi Zvobgo (ZANU (PF)) 14,954; Zachariah Isaac Rioga (MDC) 5,544.
103. MWENEZI: Isaiah Shumba, alias Mwasvayamwando (ZANU (PF)) 22,676; Kudakwashe Bhasikiti (Ind) 2,643; Luciah Masekesa (MDC) 1,881; Godfrey Halimani (Ind MDC) 917.
104. ZAKA EAST: Tinos Rusere (ZANU (PF)) 12,730; Ratidzo Richard Mugwagwa (MDC) 6,778.
105. ZAKA WEST: Jefta Johnson Chindanya (ZANU (PF)) 10,928; Charles Musimiki (MDC) 7,444; Mapetere Vincent Dziva Mawere (Ind) 3,890.
  Matabeleland North
106. BUBI-MGUZA: Jacob Thabani Mabikwa (MDC) 12,837; Obert Mpofu (ZANU (PF)) 6,645; Rueben Donga (ZAPU) 1,272; Mark Harold Ncube (LPZ) 889; Canaan Calisto Ndebele (Liberty Party) 223.
107. HWANGE EAST: Cephas Nyoni (MDC) 15,271; Jacob Mudenda (ZANU (PF)) 3,617; Khumbulani Ncube (ZAPU) 384; George Ncube (Ind) 339.
108. HWANGE WEST: Jealous Sansole (MDC) 15,132; Sphiwe Mafuwa (ZANU (PF)) 2,445; Gifton Ndumani (ZAPU) 429.
109. BINGA: Joel Gabhuza (MDC) 19,894; Joshua Muzamba (ZANU (PF)) 2,678; Leonard Ndlovu (ZAPU) 594.
110. LUPANE: David Mpala (MDC) 14,439; Headman Moyo (ZANU (PF)) 3,300; Kenneth Mhlanga (ZAPU) 972.
  Matabeleland South
111. BEITBRIDGE: Kembo Mohadi (ZANU (PF)) 12,988; Seyiso Moyo (MDC) 7,686; Malobeli Smith Mbedzi (ZAPU) 1,084.
112. BULILIMA-MANGWE NORTH: Moses Mzila Ndlovu (MDC) 11,767; Richard Ndlovu (ZANU (PF)) 8,679.
113. BULILIMA-MANGWE SOUTH: Edward Tshotsha Moyo Mkhosi (MDC) 11,761; Simon Khaya Moyo (ZANU (PF)) 5,617; Callistus Dube (ZAPU) 556; Cosmos Ncube (LPZ) 253; Pharaoh Hezekiya Tusi (UP) 233.
114. GWANDA NORTH: Paul Themba Nyathi (MDC) 13,039; Thenjiwe Lesabe (ZANU (PF)) 4,358; Agrippa Hlangabeza Madlela (ZAPU) 299; Jabulani Ndlovu (LPZ) 242; Patrick Moyo (ZAPU) 221.
115. GWANDA SOUTH: Abednico Ncube (ZANU (PF)) 9,913; Paulos Matjaka Nare (MDC) 7,944; Mchasisi Nare (Ind) 674.
116. INSIZA: George Joe Ndlovu (MDC) 12,049; Naison Ndlovu (ZANU (PF)) 5,304; Albert Ncube (ZAPU) 974.
117. MATOBO: Lovemore Moyo (MDC) 14,701; Ananias Sitomi Nyathi (ZANU (PF)) 6,219; Andrew Ngwenya (LPZ) 419; Augustine Mbelekwa Tinaye Dube (Ind) 213.
118. UMZINGWANE: Nomalanga Mzilikazi Khumalo (MDC) 12,878; Tomas Dube (ZANU (PF)) 2,887; Albert Ndlovu (Ind) 437; Elias Njani (ZAPU) 282; Christopher Dube (LPZ) 176; Rev. Albert Ncube (ZIP) 118; Florence Ngwenya (LPZ) 45.
119. TSHOLOTSHO: Mtoliki Sibanda (MDC) 12,318; Ndabazekaya Mathema (ZANU (PF)) 5,634; George Moyo (LPZ) 0.
120. NKAYI: Abednico Bhebhe (MDC) 15,701; Obidiah Moyo (ZANU (PF)) 5,746; Maploti Donga (ZAPU) 2,047; Nelson Moyo (LPZ) 404; Clerk Mpofu (LP) 313.

== Byelections ==
=== 29. Marondera West byelection ===
Held following the death of Rufaro Gwanzura (ZANU (PF)) in a car crash in August 2000. The poll was held on 25–26 November 2000. The result was: Ambrose Mutinhiri (ZANU (PF)) 7,376; Shadreck Chipangura (MDC) 4,366; Egypt Dzinemunenzva (African National Party) 377.

=== 93. Bikita West byelection ===
Held following the death of Amos Mutongi (MDC). The poll was held on 13–14 January 2001. The result was: Cladius Makova (ZANU (PF)) 12,993; Boniface Pakai (MDC) 7,001.

=== 55. Bindura byelection ===
Held following the death of Border Gezi (ZANU (PF)) in a car crash on 28 April 2001. The poll was held on 27–28 July 2001. The result was: Elliot Manyika (ZANU (PF)) 15,864; Elliot Pfebve (MDC) 9,456.

=== 69. Makoni West byelection ===
Held following the death of Moven Mahachi (ZANU (PF)). The poll was held on 8–9 September 2001. The result was: Gibson Munyoro (ZANU (PF)) 10,610; Remus Makuwaza (MDC) 5,841; Egypt Dzimunhenzva (African National Party) 665.

=== 31. Chikomba byelection ===
Held following the death of Chenjerai Hunzvi (ZANU (PF)) on 4 June 2001. The poll was held on 22–23 September 2001. The result was: Bernard Makokove (ZANU (PF)) 15,570; Oswald Toendepi Ndanga (MDC) 5,207; Thomas Mudzinga (ZANU (Ndonga)) 347; Takaindisa Gilbert Muzondo (United Parties) 165.

=== 51. Hurungwe West byelection ===
Held following the death of Mark Madiro (ZANU (PF)) in May 2002. The poll was held on 28–29 September 2002. The result was: Phone Madiro (ZANU (PF)) 15,882; Justin Dandawa (MDC) 2,665.

=== 116. Insiza byelection ===
Held following the death of George Ndlovu (MDC) on 11 August 2002. The poll was held on 26–27 October 2002. The result was: Andrew Langa (ZANU (PF)) 12,115; Siyabonga Ncube (MDC) 5,102.

=== 11. Highfield byelection ===
Held following the expulsion of Munyaradzi Gwisai from the MDC. The poll was held on 29–30 March 2003. The result was: Pearson Mungofa (MDC) 8,759; Joseph Chinotimba (ZANU (PF)) 4,844; African National Party 272; Munyaradzi Gwisai (International Socialist Organisation) 73; United Parties 34; Zimbabwe Democratic Party 8.

=== 13. Kuwadzana byelection ===
Held following the death of Learnmore Jongwe (MDC) on 22 October 2002. The poll was held on 29–30 March 2003. The result was: Nelson Chamisa (MDC) 12,548; David Mutasa (ZANU (PF)) 5,002; Kempton Chihuhute (National Alliance for Good Governance) 82; United Parties 12.

=== 48. Makonde byelection ===
Held following the death of Swithun Mombeshora (ZANU (PF)). 17 March 2003. The poll was held on 30–31 August 2003. The result was: Kindness Paradza (ZANU (PF)) 11,223; Japhet Karemba (MDC) 1,769.

=== 7. Harare Central byelection ===
Held following the resignation of Mike Auret (MDC) due to ill health, on 27 February 2003. The poll was held on 30–31 August 2003. The result was: Murisi Zwizwai (MDC) 2,707; Wilson Nhara (ZANU (PF)) 1,304.

=== 46. Kadoma Central byelection ===
Held following the death of Austin Mupandawana (MDC) on 9 August 2003. The poll was held on 29–30 November 2003. The result was: Tichafa Mutema (ZANU (PF)) 9,282; Charles Mupandawana (MDC) 6,038.

=== 98. Gutu North byelection ===
Held following the death of Simon Muzenda (ZANU (PF)) in September 2003. The poll was held on 2–3 February 2004. The result was: Josiah Tungamirai (ZANU (PF)) 20,699; Crispa Musoni (MDC) 7,291.

=== 110. Lupane byelection ===
Held following the death of David Mpala (MDC) on 2 February 2004. The poll was held on 15–16 May 2004. The result was: Martin Khumalo (ZANU (PF)) 10,069, Njabuliso Mguni (MDC) 9,186.

=== 19. Zengeza byelection ===
Held following the resignation of Tafandwa Musekiwa (MDC). The poll was held on 27–28 March 2004. The result was: Christopher Chigumba (ZANU (PF)) 8,447; James Makore (MDC) 6,706; Gideon Chinogurei (ZANU (Ndonga)) 96; Tendayi Chakanyuka (National Alliance for Good Governance) 37.

=== 28. Seke byelection ===
Held following the death of Bennie Tumbare-Mutasa (MDC). The MDC decided to boycott the poll and therefore on 5 September 2004, Phineas Chihota (ZANU (PF)) was declared elected unopposed.

=== 102. Masvingo South byelection ===
Held following the death of Edson Zvobgo (ZANU (PF)) on 22 August 2004. On 9 October 2004, Walter Mzembi (ZANU (PF)) was declared elected unopposed. A candidate from Zimbabwe Youth in Alliance had submitted nomination papers which were technically deficient.
