= Movement for Democratic Change (1999–2005) =

Zimbabwean political party

- Leader: Morgan Tsvangirai
- Founded: 11 September 1999
- Dissolved: 2005
- Succeeded by: Movement for Democratic Change – Tsvangirai; Movement for Democratic Change – Ncube
- Headquarters: 44 Harvest House Nelson Mandela Avenue & Angwa Street, Harare Zimbabwe, 263
- Ideology: Democratic socialism Social democracy
- International affiliation: Socialist International
- Colours: Red and black

Party flag

The Movement for Democratic Change (MDC) was a Zimbabwean political party organised under the leadership of Morgan Tsvangirai. The MDC was formed in 1999 as an opposition party to President Robert Mugabe's Zimbabwe African National Union – Patriotic Front (Zanu-PF). The MDC was made up of many civic groups who campaigned for the "No" vote in the 2000 constitutional referendum, which would limit a president's service to two terms, before the introduction of a prime minister, as well as giving legal immunities to the state, as well as the Forum Party.

As the term limit was not retroactive, Mugabe could still have maintained the presidency for two more terms. The most controversial part of the constitution was the land reform policies. It stated that, as in the Lancaster House Agreement, Britain would fund land reform from white settlers to landless black peasants. If Britain failed to compensate the farmers, the government would take the farms, without compensation.

The party split over whether to contest the 2005 Zimbabwean Senate election into the Movement for Democratic Change – Tsvangirai (MDC-T), the larger party led by Morgan Tsvangirai, and the Movement for Democratic Change – Ncube, a smaller faction then led by Arthur Mutambara and later led by Welshman Ncube. However, the two factions formed an electoral pact for the 2018 Zimbabwean general election called the MDC Alliance and re-united under the original name, the Movement for Democratic Change (MDC), in September 2018. A minority MDC-T faction remained independent and after new disputes, the reunited MDC was succeeded by Citizens Coalition for Change.

== History ==
=== Origins and rise ===
The MDC began after the People's Working Convention in February 1999. In February 2000, Zimbabwe African National Union – Patriotic Front (ZANU-PF), led by Robert Mugabe organized a constitutional referendum. The proposed change would have limited future presidents to two terms, but as it was not retroactive, Mugabe could have stood for another two terms. It would also have made his government and military officials immune from prosecution for any illegal acts committed while in office. Additionally, it legalized the confiscation of land owned by white people for redistribution to black farmers without compensation. The MDC led opposition to the referendum, in which the government was ultimately defeated, after a low 20% turnout, by a strong urban vote fueled by an effective SMS campaign. Mugabe declared that he would "abide by the will of the people". The vote was a surprise to ZANU-PF, and an embarrassment before parliamentary elections due in mid-April. This success fueled the rise of the MDC.

In the 2000 parliamentary elections, the MDC won 57 of the 120 seats up for election. This marked the first time that an opposition party had achieved more than a handful of seats since the merger of ZANU and ZAPU in 1988. The MDC dominated in most urban centres and Matabeleland. MDC won all seats in the two biggest cities, Harare and Bulawayo and lost only two in Matabeleland. This election was viewed by international observers from the Commonwealth of Nations and Norwegian and South African parliamentary delegations declared the election not being free and fair. The MDC claimed the elections were rigged, citing state-sponsored violence and some voter results figures that were unaccounted for. They took the matter to court. Some missions from Mugabe's allies such as the Southern African Development Community (SADC) observers and the South African Ministerial Observer team held that the election was substantially free and fair.

In 2004, opposition offices in Bulawayo were raided by police officers, armed with search warrants, looking for illegal documents and weapons.

=== Growing tensions ===
During Morgan Tsvangirai's treason trial, pressure built up within the party due to the possibility that Tsvangirai would be imprisoned. There were allegedly rumors of a faction desiring an Ndebele president, Secretary General Welshman Ncube (now Secretary General of the Mutambara led Movement for Democratic Change) to replace Tsvangirai, as well as rumors of tribal prejudice on the other side. David Coltart however, claimed that people who believed this "are being deliberately mischievous or simply do not understand basic political reality in Zimbabwe" There were still however, some within the party who felt that Ncube was plotting to create a new party. There were several reports of violence at the party headquarters by youth members, including the beatings of several party members. There was even a Commission made to decide on whether these allegations were true, although no official decision was made as the commissioners failed to agree.

In 2005, amid tension, another report was drafted regarding the growing violence within the party. Because the 2004 commission had failed to reach a consensus and there had been no punishment given to the offenders, a new commission was set up to find cases of corruption and the origin of such violence. The report stated that most of there was a serious problem with misuse of the unemployed youth, who were not educated properly about the party ideology, for selfish and ambitious purposes, and that the party's principles were being consumed by greed, corruption and tribal discrimination and that this division in the party would have disastrous consequences, and was threatening to undermine the party. Several youths were expelled from the party but, little other action was taken. This move was criticized by the party's legal spokesman David Coltart:

"I cannot believe that the youths involved in these despicable acts acted independently. It is common cause that they were unemployed and it is equally clear that they had access to substantial funding. That money must have come from people with access to resources. The instructions to act must have come from people within the Party as no one else would have the detailed knowledge the youths had access to. In expelling the youths and relatively low ranking members of the security team we have only dealt with the symptoms of the problem, not its root cause."

Former allies, the Zimbabwe Congress of Trade Unions (ZCTU) and the National Constitutional Assembly also clashed with MDC leadership. In particular, the ZCTU said that the MDC should not take up its seats in parliament, and should concentrate on extra-parliamentary affairs. They argued that rejecting the electoral process, and pointing out its flaws, while still contesting the elections was sending mixed signals to the MDC support base. However, MDC officials replied that there was a strong desire in the party to take up the seats available, in order to increase influence over electoral procedures.

In July 2005 a management committee was set up to discuss these factional issues, particularly the alleged formation of a "kitchen cabinet", made up of presidential aides, around the president which was acquiring power above those of the elected leadership. These allegations were made by four of the six members in the committee, namely the Vice President Gibson Sibanda, the Secretary General Welshman Ncube, the Deputy Secretary General Gift Chimanikire and the National Treasurer Fletcher Dulini. Morgan Tsvangirai claimed that these claims had no substance, and were down to rumour and hearsay. Party Chairman Isaac Matongo rallied behind the president, although he was the only party official to hold this belief to come from Matebeleland.

In a critique of the party structures in 2005, the MDC leadership admitted that the party had "moved away from its social democratic, all inclusive, non-tribalistic foundations." Cracks had also emerged along ethnic lines and between trade unionists and academics.

=== Split ===
It is widely believed that the split was a reflection of problems that had been in the party for a while but manipulated by the CIO. The issue which eventually led to the splitting of the party was the decision on whether or not to participate in the 2005 Zimbabwe senatorial elections. The MDC had announced during mid-2004 that it would not participate in any further elections in Zimbabwe, until it believed a free and fair vote could take place. However on 3 February 2005, then spokesperson Paul Themba Nyathi told a news conference, "It is with a heavy heart that the MDC has decided to participate in the elections ... This is a decision based primarily on the demands of our people". The MDC's top six were unable to agree on the issue, and so the debate went down to the MDC National Council on October 12. They voted 33-31 in favor of contesting the election (with two spoiled papers). However, Morgan Tsvangirai told the press that the debate was tied at 50-50, which included proxies sent by Sekai Holland and Grace Kwinjeh, alleging that these were not recognised by Ncube, giving him different inaccurate figures. Morgan Tsvangirai overruled the vote, arguing that it was no use contesting an election where the electoral field "breeds illegitimate outcomes and provides for predetermined results." He argued that the Senate of Zimbabwe was part of the 17th amendment, which the MDC had opposed in Parliament.

"Well you have voted, and you have voted to participate, which as you know is against my own wish. In the circumstances I can no longer continue……No I cannot let you participate in this senate election when I believe that it is against the best interests of the party. I am President of this party. I am therefore going out of this and (will) announce to the world that the MDC will not participate in this election. If the party breaks so be it. I will answer to congress."

In response to his misinformation at the press conference Gibson Sibanda, the Deputy President of the party, summoned Tsvangirai to a hearing of the National Disciplinary Committee charging that because of his actions at and after the National Council Meeting, he had willfully violated clauses 4.4 (a), 6.1.1 (a) and (d) of the MDC constitution and clause 9.2 of the Party’s Disciplinary Code of Conduct. He also stated that Tsvangirai had addressed numerous party rallies telling supporters that the MDC was not participating in the elections, that he wrote to the Zimbabwe Electoral Commission telling them to register all MDC candidates wishing to participate as independent candidates. Furthermore, that he instructed party provincial chairpersons to ignore a letter written by the Deputy Secretary General ordering the selection of candidates, and that he had instructed the party secretariat to re-employ Nhamo Musekiwa and Washington Gaga.

Another letter was written to Tsvangirai on the same day, indicating that he had been suspended from office by the National Disciplinary Committee, while he maintained the right to appeal the decision. Tsvangirai claimed in response that the pro-senate group had not carried out proper provincial consultations. He also argued against claims that he was not respecting the founding values of the MDC by saying that his position on the senate expressed the will of the people, and that he should therefore be given power to make decisions. He also struck out against the supporters of participation, saying that they were planning a new "Unity Accord" and betraying the people of Matebeleland like Joshua Nkomo in the 1990s, and accused the Ncube faction of trying to get rid of him so that the new MDC could become puppets of Robert Mugabe.

"Even if I am left alone, I will not betray the contract I made with the people. The issue that is there is not about the senate only. It is about whether you want to confront Mugabe or you want to compromise with Mugabe. Some of us are now working towards a new unity accord. We are saying ‘no’ to unity accord number two. With us there is no unity accord....we will not do what Nkomo did."

Tsvangirai expelled supporters of the Senate from his party, and sought to nullify the charges and proceedings instituted against him by Gibson Sibanda by convening another National Council. The majority of major civic groups continued to support Tsvangirai, calling the Ncube faction traitors and rebels, including the National Constitutional Assembly - a coalition of pro-democracy civil society groups, which said the election was conceived only as the result of an undemocratic constitutional change. Tsvangirai believed that there was little point in participating in elections in the current political situation in Zimbabwe, as the results, according to him, were certain to be rigged. Welshman Ncube however, declared that the only way of beating Zanu-PF was through elections, and there was no point in boycotting the elections just because of allegations that they were not free and fair.

Discussions in February 2006 confirmed the existence of what Ncube called a "mafia kitchen cabinet", a growth in youth violence, conflict and competition for the office of president and the resulting lack of implementation of party policies. Tsvangirai also considered South African President Thabo Mbeki's mediation attempts as "destructive" and continued to deny tribal discrimination within the party. He was also irate over the Central Intelligence Organization's infiltration of the MDC and claimed that this was a deliberate attempt by Zanu-PF to divide the party.

A compromise was proposed at the end of the first meeting, which would result in the pro-senate faction withdrawing from the election. However, the Management Committee would attempt to remove the "kitchen cabinet" and parallel structure. Thirdly, public recriminations would have to stop while the leadership drew up a program to help the party move forward. The compromise was however, refuted by both sides, with Tsvangirai unable to make a commitment on the subject of his aides, and the pro-senate faction unable to agree not to contest the Senate election at the second mediation meeting.

After the Senate elections, the MDC split into two groups: one led by Morgan Tsvangirai, and another by his deputy Gibson Sibanda with the support of Welshman Ncube, Gift Chimanikire and spokesperson Paul Themba Nyathi. The pro-Senate group had one more member in the House of Assembly at the time of the split, however senior members of the pro-Senate faction subsequently defected to MDC-T led by Tsvangirai including its Chairman Gift Chimanikire, Blessing Chebundo, the Member of Parliament for Kwekwe, the Environmental Secretary and Binga Member of Parliament Joel Gabuza, and Senate Candidate for Tsholotsho Sam Sipepa Nkomo. Although the pro-senate faction had the bulk of its support in Matabeleland, the party chose the Shona academic Arthur Mutambara to lead their party.

== Central Intelligence Organisation infiltration attempt ==
The Central Intelligence Organisation (CIO) failed for a while in dividing the party by using a white officer from the old Rhodesian Army, Col Lionel Dyck, to make different and secret proposals to Mr. Tsvangirai and Prof. Welshman Ncube. Dyck, a close business associate of Mnangagwa, had formed a company called MineTech, which gained lucrative mine-clearing contracts from the Zimbabwe government via Mnangagwa. MineTech has now relocated to Wiltshire in England and has linked up with the British company Exploration Logistics which is headed by Alastair Morrison OBE, MC. Morrison, a former 2 i/c of 22 SAS, has very close links with British intelligence. It would appear that Mnangagwa, who worked for the American NSA while on the DARE, has now transferred his allegiance. Mnangagwa has substantial property investments in England through front companies.

== Electoral history ==
=== Presidential elections ===
Election	Party candidate	Votes	%	Result
2002	Morgan Tsvangirai	1,258,401	42.0%	Lost ✗

=== House of Assembly elections ===
Election	Party leader	Votes	%	Seats	+/–	Position	Result
2000	Morgan Tsvangirai	1,171,096	47.0%	57 / 120	▲57	▲2nd	Opposition
2005	Morgan Tsvangirai	1,041,292	39.5%	41 / 120	▼16	2nd	Opposition
