= Rusty Markham =

Zimbabwean politician

Member of the National Assembly of Zimbabwe
- Incumbent
- Assumed office 5 September 2018
- Preceded by: Tongesayi Mudambo
- Constituency: Harare North (2018–2023); Harare East (2023–present)

Member of the Harare City Council for Ward 18
- In office 2013–2018
- Succeeded by: Ian Makone

Personal details
- Born: 19 May 1960 (age 66) Choma, Northern Rhodesia
- Party: Citizens Coalition for Change (2023–present); Movement for Democratic Change (Until 2023)
- Education: Gwebi Agricultural College

Allan Norman "Rusty" Markham (born 19 May 1960) is a Zimbabwean farmer and politician who was elected to the National Assembly of Zimbabwe for Harare North in the 2018 general election as a member of the MDC Alliance. He crossed the floor to the newly formed Citizens Coalition for Change and was elected Member of Parliament for the neighbouring Harare East constituency in the 2023 general election.

Prior to his election to Parliament, he served on the Harare City Council from 2013 to 2018 as a member of the Movement for Democratic Change – Tsvangirai.

== Early life and education ==
Markham was born on 19 May 1960 in Choma, Northern Rhodesia (now Zambia). He is a third- or fourth-generation white Zimbabwean. His great-grandfather was an Anglican missionary to the country in the 1890s.

He attended John Cowie Primary School in Rusape, followed by Umtali Boys High School in Umtali (now Mutare) and Gwebi Agricultural College.

== Career ==
Markham works in agriculture and agronomy, and has been director of a company since 2004. He is a trustee of the Harare Wetlands Trust, the Stratford Road Community Trust, and the Hatcliffe Development Trust.

Markham joined the Movement for Democratic Change in 2000. From 2013 to 2018, he was a member of the Harare City Council representing Ward 18. He was elected to the National Assembly in the 2018 general election as the MDC Alliance candidate for the Harare North constituency, unseating the ZANU–PF incumbent, Tongesayi Mudambo. He was sworn in to Parliament on 5 September 2018.

Markham was arrested in January 2019 along with four other MDC parliamentarians. Later in 2019, he criticised the ruling government over what he claimed was corrupt interference with agriculture.

Prior to the 2023 general election, Markham joined the Citizens Coalition for Change led by former Movement for Democratic Change – Tsvangirai leader Nelson Chamisa. He unseated fellow CCC legislator Tendai Biti in the internal party selection process to determine the party's candidate for Harare East for the election. Markham was elected MP for the constituency at the election.

== Personal life ==
He is married and lives in the Borrowdale suburb of Harare.
