= Movement for Democratic Change =

Movement for Democratic Change or MDC may refer to:

- Movement for Democratic Change – Tsvangirai (MDC–T), the former main opposition party in Zimbabwe
  - Movement for Democratic Change – Tsvangirai Congress 2006, the second MDC–T congress held in Harare, Zimbabwe, on 18 March 2006
- Movement for Democratic Change – Ncube (MDC–N), a former opposition party led by Welshman Ncube
- Movement for Democratic Change (1999–2005), a political party in Zimbabwe formed in September 1999 that split in October 2005
- Movement for Democratic Change – Mutambara (MDC–M), a smaller faction led by Arthur Mutambara until January 2011
- Movement for Democratic Change (2018), a reunited party of the various factions

== See also ==
- Movement for Democratic Change Alliance
- United Movement for Democratic Change
