= Harare East =

Constituency of the Parliament of Zimbabwe

- National Assembly constituency for the Parliament of Zimbabwe
- District: Harare
- Province: Harare
- Electorate: 36,535 (2023)

Current constituency
- Number of members: 1
- Party: ZANU-PF
- Member: Kiven Mutimbanyoka

Harare East is a constituency represented in the National Assembly of the Parliament of Zimbabwe. Located in Harare, it is currently represented since the 2023 election by Rusty Markham of the Citizens Coalition for Change.

The constituency was previously represented since the 2000 election by Tendai Biti. Biti was recalled on 17 March 2021 amid factional disputes within the opposition Movement for Democratic Change Alliance. He was reelected to Parliament as a member of the newly-formed CCC in a by-election held 26 March 2022.

== Members ==
Election	Member	Party
1990	Margaret Dongo	ZANU–PF
1995	Tirivanhu Mudariki	ZANU–PF
2000	Tendai Biti	MDC
2005	Tendai Biti	MDC
2008	Tendai Biti	MDC–T
2013	Tendai Biti	MDC–T
2018	Tendai Biti	MDC Alliance
2022 by-election	Tendai Biti	CCC
2023	Rusty Markham	CCC

== Elections ==
2022 by-election: Harare East
Candidate	Party	Votes	%	+/–
Tendai Biti	CCC	7,534	69.79	New
Mavis Gumbo	ZANU–PF	3,045	28.20	+1.74
Christopher Mbanga	MDC Alliance	114	1.06	-62.38
Garikai Mlambo	United Zimbabwe Alliance	100	0.93	New
Rukanda Henry Gwinyai	Labour, Economists and African Democrats	3	0.03	New
Total		10,796	100.00	–
Valid votes		10,796	99.16	+0.21
Invalid/blank votes		92	0.84	-0.21
Total votes		10,888	100.00	–
Majority		4,489	41.58	+4.61
CCC gain from MDC Alliance				

Parliamentary Election 2008: Harare East
Party	Candidate	Votes	%	±%
MDC–T	Tendai Biti	8,377	76.40	8.43
ZANU–PF	Noah Mangondo	2,587	23.60	−8.43
Majority		5,790	52.81	16.87
Turnout		10,964	36.39	
MDC–T hold				

== See also ==
- List of Zimbabwean parliamentary constituencies
