= Susan Tsvangirai =

Zimbabwean first lady

Spouse of the Prime Minister of Zimbabwe
- In office 15 February 2009 – 6 March 2009
- Preceded by: Sally Hayfron
- Succeeded by: Elizabeth Macheka

Personal details
- Born: Susan Nyaradzo Mhundwa; 24 April 1958 Buhera, Federation of Rhodesia and Nyasaland
- Died: 6 March 2009 (aged 50) Harare–Masvingo Highway, Zimbabwe
- Spouse: Morgan Tsvangirai
- Children: 6 (including Richard)
- Occupation: Businesswoman (sewing and catering)

Susan Nyaradzo Tsvangirai (née Mhundwa; 24 April 1958 – 6 March 2009) was a prominent figure in Zimbabwean politics as a notable member of the opposition Movement for Democratic Change – Tsvangirai (MDC-T) political party, and was the wife of Morgan Tsvangirai, former Prime Minister of Zimbabwe. She has been described as being a mother figure for the country, providing strength behind the scenes.

== Personal and political life ==
Tsvangirai was born on 24 April 1958. She was raised in the Gunde area of Buhera District, which is near Dorowa Minerals.

Tsvangirai met her future husband, Morgan, in 1976 at the Trojan Nickel Mine in Bindura, Rhodesia, where he worked at the time as a foreman. She was visiting her uncle at the time of their meeting. Morgan reportedly told a friend at the time, "That is the girl I am going to marry!" They married in 1978 and the couple had six children during their marriage, which lasted for 31 years.

Although Tsvangirai often avoided the direct public spotlight, she played a significant, even if sometimes symbolic, role in Zimbabwean politics. She became one of the most popular figures within the MDC-T. Dennis Murira, the MDC-T Elections Director, described her as "a woman who was of immense significance to the party, a woman who on several occasions managed to comfort a number of us who were victims of this struggle." Supporters often chanted "mother, mother" at rallies and events. She remained by her husband as he faced treason charges and police beatings in his opposition to President Robert Mugabe.

In addition to her MDC-T campaign and rally efforts, Tsvangirai offered vital support to her husband, and the MDC-T. Following attempts on Morgan's life, by groups loyal to Mugabe and the Zimbabwe African National Union – Patriotic Front (Zanu-PF) movement, Tsvangirai brought him food in prison after his police beatings and nursed him back to health afterwards. Such as when, in 1997, an unidentified gang tried to throw Morgan from a tenth floor office window, and in 2007 when he was admitted to hospital after a brutal assault by police at a prayer rally. She also made a point of visiting MDC members who were jailed while the party was in opposition.

In March 2009, following her husband's success in forging a unity government, Tsvangirai told a BBC affiliate that the past decade had been an "endurance test" for her, her husband and his MDC colleagues:

People went through hell, but they stuck to their ideals to seek change through democratic means... This was a struggle that we endured with MDC cadres, activists, supporters and peace-loving Zimbabweans. To them I say thank you so much for the support they gave the MDC to reach this momentous period.

Following her death, Thabitha Khumalo, a member of parliament for the MDC, described her role as "a mother figure for the whole nation. Few people knew about her work. Whenever they saw her she was accompanying her husband to court or to vote, but very few people knew she played a very crucial role behind closed doors... She was a pillar of strength to her husband. In a struggle like his, you need someone to lean on and she was always there for him."

== Death ==
Susan Tsvangirai was killed in a collision on the Harare-Masvingo Road on 6 March 2009, approximately 45 miles south of the capital, Harare. Her husband, Morgan, who had been prime minister less than one month at the time of the accident, was injured in the crash. The couple had been en route to their home in Buhera, Manicaland, where they planned to stay the night before attending a Movement for Democratic Change – Tsvangirai party meeting at the Murambinda Business Center the next day. They were travelling in a Land Cruiser within a three car convoy when a truck belonging to the US aid agency United States Agency for International Aid (USAID) travelling in the opposite direction crossed into their lane and side-swiped their vehicle, causing it to roll over three times. The driver, 35-year-old Chinoona Mwanda, was found guilty of culpable homicide. Morgan said his wife's death was an accident. The British foreign ministry said the truck was part of an aid project jointly funded by the US and UK and that the crash appeared to be "a genuine accident".

Morgan suffered minor bruises and scratches in the accident but Susan was pronounced dead at a hospital in Beatrice, Zimbabwe at the age of 50 years. Dennis Murira, the executive director of the Movement for Democratic Change – Tsvangirai political party, told the media "the devastating news is that he (Morgan Tsvangirai) has lost his beloved wife, a woman who was of immense significance to the party, a woman who on several occasions managed to comfort a number of us who were victims of this struggle." It was announced on 8 March 2009 that Tsvangirai will be buried in her rural home in Buhera on 11 March 2009.

== Impact of the crash and death ==
Tsvangirai's death came at a challenging time for the fledgling power-sharing government, just two days after Morgan delivered his maiden speech to parliament. Her death further complicated an already tense situation in Zimbabwe's government.

The crash raised suspicions of foul play. Even though traffic accidents are common in Zimbabwe, due to the fact that vehicles in the country are often in bad shape, many roads are in poor condition, and drivers often are inexperienced; previous political rivals of President Robert Mugabe from Herbert Chitepo on have also been involved in fatal car accidents: in 2001 Employment Minister Border Gezi and Defence Minister Moven Mahachi, and in 2008 government minister and former regional governor Elliot Manyika, all died in car crashes.

Tom McDonald, the United States Ambassador to Zimbabwe from 1997 to 2001, said, "I'm skeptical about any motor vehicle accident in Zimbabwe involving an opposition figure... President Mugabe has a history of strange car accidents when someone lo and behold dies – it's sort of his M.O. of how they get rid of people they don't like... So, when I hear that Tsvangirai was in an accident, it gives me pause." The former US diplomat was calling for an outside investigation of the crash.

A statement issued by the MDC said: "We suspect that this is not a genuine accident and we appeal to Zimbabweans in South Africa to remain calm as facts continue to surface. We strongly believe that these are the evil acts of a few individuals bent on derailing the progress of the Inclusive government. We are, however, alive to the fact that a lot of Robert Mugabe's opponents died in suspicious road accidents involving army trucks."

Following the brutal suppression of the opposition leading into the close 2009 election; Mugabe was pressured into a power-sharing deal, resulting in the formation of a unity government. Rumours that the fatal incident was a botched assassination attempt (intended for Morgan rather than Susan) caused unrest amongst MDC supporters, which threatened to collapse the fragile Mugabe-Tsvangirai coalition government. Some suspect that the burden of the loss of Tsvangirai's support may also undermine Morgan's performance as Prime Minister.
