= United Movement for Democratic Change =

Political party in Zimbabwe

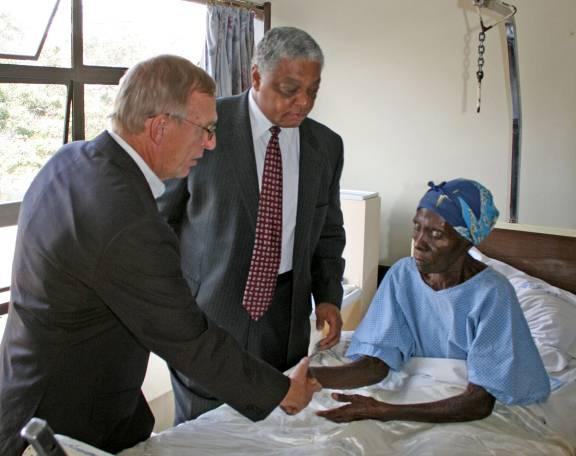
Swedish Ambassador Sten Rylander (left) and United States Ambassador James D. McGee (center) console a woman believed to be over 80 years old who reported being assaulted because her sons were known supporters of the opposition United Movement for Democratic Change.

United Movement for Democratic Change is a Zimbabwean political party founded in November 2014 as a merger of two parties descended from the Movement for Democratic Change (MDC): the Movement for Democratic Change – Ncube (MDC-N) headed by Welshman Ncube, which broke away from MDC in 2005, and the MDC Renewal Team led by Tendai Biti, which broke away from Movement for Democratic Change – Tsvangirai in 2014 in protest against what they saw as the ineffectual leadership and increasingly authoritarian tendencies of party chairman Morgan Tsvangirai. The party is intended as the core of a united opposition movement in Zimbabwe and is jointly led by Ncube and Sekai Holland. It aimed to hold a formative party congress in August 2015 to agree on a manifesto. The party has 17 MPs (15 from MDC Renewal Team and 2 from MDC-N) and 2 Senators (both former Renewal Team members) making it the third strongest parliamentary party in Zimbabwe.
