= Face of Courage =

Face of Courage:Morgan Tsvangirai
- Author: Sarah Hudleston
- Language: English
- Subject: Biography
- Genre: Non-fiction
- Publisher: DOUBLE STOREY BOOKS
- Publication date: 2005
- Publication place: South Africa
- Media type: Print (Hardback & Paperback)
- Pages: 224 pp
- ISBN: 978-1-77013-005-0
- OCLC: 66458707
- Dewey Decimal: 968.9105/1092 B 22
- LC Class: DT2999.T88 H83 2005

Face of Courage: Morgan Tsvangirai is a biography of Morgan Tsvangirai written by Sarah Hudleston, tracing his trade union roots, his rise to the leadership of the Movement for Democratic Change and the government's attempts to implicate him in a treason plot.

Against a backdrop of the social, political and economic developments in Zimbabwe, this book focuses on the life and career of Morgan Tsvangirai. It draws on interviews with Tsvangirai and those close to him.

== See also ==
- Morgan Tsvangirai
- Movement for Democratic Change
- Robert Mugabe
