= Tonderai Ndira =

- Born: 1975/1976
- Died: Between 13 and 22 May 2008
- Cause of death: murdered
- Body discovered: morgue at Parirenyatwa Hospital
- Resting place: Warren Hills Cemetery, Harare, Zimbabwe
- Known for: political activist

Tonderai Ndira (1975/1976 – May 2008) was a Zimbabwe and a Movement for Democratic Change party member murdered in May 2008.

Ndira lived in the township of Mabvuku and Tafara, east of the capital, Harare, and was a "prominent activist" member of the Movement for Democratic Change. He was described as a human rights campaigner and as "a youth activist who went around the country holding workshops and teaching people their rights". He had a wife and three young children.

He was arrested on thirty-five occasions, and was reportedly described by his followers as "Zimbabwe's Steve Biko".

The Sunday Herald reported:

"Ndira was legendary in Zimbabwe for his exploits. Once when police were hot on his tail, he famously joined the police search for himself, establishing himself at the heart of the search party without the police ever realising."

Ndira was accused of taking part in an assault in 2006 against MP Trudy Stevenson and three other members of the splinter pro-Senate MDC-M. He and several others were arrested, then released without charge due to lack of evidence. The MDC accused Zanu-PF of being behind the attack.

== Kidnapping and aftermath ==
He was abducted from his home by ten unidentified armed men early in the morning of 13 May 2008, in the context of campaigning between the two rounds of the 2008 presidential election. His body was found later in the month; it was reported that he had been shot in the heart, with multiple stab wounds, his eyes gouged, his tongue cut out, and his neck, skull, jaw and knuckles broken. The Sunday Herald stated that he had been "murdered by government death squads", and added:

"Ndira's fate has been shared by scores of opposition supporters in recent weeks. He was targeted because of his celebrity and because fear is exactly what the generals and security chiefs of 84-year-old Mugabe are counting on, as they try to overturn the first-round defeat that saw at least 56% of Zimbabwe's people vote against the only head of state they have known since independence."

The autopsy's preliminary report failed to identify a cause of death. It showed that the damage to Ndira's body was due to decomposition rather than torture; due to the amount of time necessary for this degree of decomposition, it was believed that he was killed promptly after being abducted.

== Posthumous ==
Following the discovery of his body on 22 May, Ndira was buried at Warren Hills Cemetery in Harare three days later. MDC party president Morgan Tsvangirai, who had returned to Zimbabwe shortly beforehand, presided over the funeral and described Ndira's killing as "a clear testimony of the callousness of this regime", vowing to defeat Mugabe in the election despite such violence.

== See also ==
- List of kidnappings
- List of solved missing person cases (2000s)
- List of unsolved murders (2000–present)
