= People's Democratic Party (Zimbabwe) =

Zimbabwean political party

- Founder: Tendai Biti
- Founded: 2015
- Dissolved: 2018
- Split from: Movement for Democratic Change – Tsvangirai
- Merged into: Movement for Democratic Change
- Headquarters: Harare, Zimbabwe
- Ideology: Democratic socialism Social democracy
- National affiliation: MDC Alliance
- International affiliation: Progressive Alliance

Website
- https://www.facebook.com/Peoples-Democratic-Party-Zimbabwe-PDP-1743291559265230/

The People's Democratic Party (PDP) was a political party in Zimbabwe. It was launched in September 2015 after a faction broke away from the Movement for Democratic Change – Tsvangirai. At their breakaway in 2014 they initially called themselves Movement for Democratic Change – Renewal. The president of the party was Tendai Biti, a former minister of finance of Zimbabwe serving in the Morgan Tsvangirai government 2009–2013. The party split in September 2017 over Tendai Biti and other party officials joining the MDC Alliance electoral bloc, with a breakaway faction being led by Lucia Matibenga in an interim capacity. After the 2018 election, the Tendai Biti-led faction of the PDP re-united with other splinter groups of the original MDC (MDC-T and MDC-N) to form a single party under the original name Movement for Democratic Change (MDC).

This party is not related to the former Zimbabwe People's Democratic Party (ZPDP) formed in 1991 and led by Isabel Shanangurai Madangure. It participated in the 2005 legislative elections but never had parliamentary representation.

Logo of former entity called Zimbabwe People's Democratic Party
