= ED pfee =

ED Pfee is a slogan used by ZANU–PF and Zimbabwe president Emmerson Mnangagwa's supporters as a sign of endorsing him in the 2018 Zimbabwean general election. The ED Pfee slogan is used as a rally chant and social media slogan.

== Meaning ==
ED is the abbreviation for Emmerson Dambudzo, the president's name and pfee is a Shona slang term connoting penetration.
