= Movement for Democratic Change – Tsvangirai Congress 2006 =

The second Movement for Democratic Change – Tsvangirai congress was held in Harare on 18 March 2006.

== The Congress ==
According to constitution, the functions and Powers of Congress shall be:

- (a) to formulate the policies and principles of the Party;
- (b) to supervise the implementation of policies, principles and programmes of the

Party;

- (c) subject to clause 5.4, to elect members of the National Council, save for those

members referred to in section 5.4.2 (t) - (v);

- (d) to approve the audited financial statements of the Party and appoint or reappoint

auditors;

- (e) to repeal or amend the Constitution; and
- (f) To dissolve the party in terms of this Constitution.
- (g) to review, ratify, modify, alter or rescind any decision taken by any organ or

official of the party;

- (h) to condone any reasonable non-compliance with the time limits provided for in

this Constitution, save for the time limits defined in paragraph 5.2.2.

== The presidential and vice presidential voting ==
Morgan Tsvangirai was elected president unanimously, and Hon.Thokozani Khuphe was elected for vice president, replacing Gibson Sibanda.

== Tsvangirai acceptance speech ==
In his acceptance speech Tsvangirai said:

"Faced with a ruthless dictator, the temptation among the people is to look inwards, to take cover within our individual self and to insulate against collective action. That temptation can overwhelm you and promote fear. Fear is sign of weakness. Fear is a sin. With hope and courage, we must overcome fear. I feel I must record my unhappiness and sorrow at the news of a number of pensioners, the vulnerable and the weak that lost their lives because of lack of support. The dictatorship has demolished their coping mechanisms, their last lines of defence and thrown them off balance. Through propaganda and a pliant media, the people of Zimbabwe must exercise extreme care and caution. The regime wants you to give up."

Preceded by 2000; Chitungwiza	MDC National Congress	Succeeded by 2010; Bulawayo

== See also ==
- Movement for Democratic Change
- Morgan Tsvangirai
- 44 Harvest House
