= Elton Mangoma =

Zimbabwean politician

Elton Steers Mangoma

President of the Coalition of Democrats
- Incumbent
- Assumed office 20 October 2017

President of the Renewal Democrats of Zimbabwe
- Incumbent
- Assumed office 2015*

Member of Parliament for Makoni North
- In office 29 March 2008 – 30 July 2018

Minister of Economic Planning and Investment Promotion
- In office 13 February 2009 – 11 September 2013
- President: Robert Mugabe
- Prime Minister: Morgan Tsvangirai

Personal details
- Born: 9 November 1955 Makoni, Manicaland
- Party: Movement for Democratic Change – Tsvangirai (2000–2015); Renewal Democrats of Zimbabwe (2015-present); Coalition of Democrats (2017-present)
- Children: 3
- Parent: Solomon Sekesai Mangoma
- Education: University of South Africa
- *Exact dates of appointment unknown

Elton Steers Mangoma is a Zimbabwean politician, and a former Minister of Economic Planning and Investment Promotion. Following the 2018 Zimbabwean General Election he is no longer a member of the House of Assembly. He currently serves as the president of the Coalition of Democrats.

== Political career ==
Mangoma was a senior official in Morgan Tsvangirai's Movement for Democratic Change (MDC-T), and was one of the party's founding members in 1999. Before launching his political career, he was manager of several companies including Deloitte & Touche and Delta Corporation.

=== Election to Parliament ===
In 2008, Mangoma became the Movement for Democratic Change candidate for the Makoni North constituency. He was subsequently elected on 29 March in the 2008 General Election.

=== Minister of Economic Planning and Investment Promotion ===
Following the 2008–2009 political negotiations, a power sharing agreement was made between ZANU-PF led by then President Robert Mugabe and the MDC-T led by Tsvangirai. This was due to the former losing their majority in the House of Assembly. Under the agreement Tsvangirai became Prime Minister and members of his party were included in Mugabe's cabinet. As a result, Mangoma was appointed to lead the Ministry of Economic Planning and Investment Promotion.

=== Renewal Democrats of Zimbabwe ===
In 2015, Mangoma left the MDC-T and became the president of the Renewal Democrats of Zimbabwe (RDZ).

=== 2018 general election ===
In 2017, a group of political parties (including the RDZ) formed an electoral bloc under the name Coalition of Democrats (CODE). The group subsequently elected Mangoma as their president on 20 October that year. As president of the bloc, Mangoma ran as their presidential candidate during the 2018 General Election campaign. As he was running for the presidency, Mangoma could not run for re-election to the House of Assembly for his constituency.

== Other Roles ==
Prior to his political career, Mangoma was an accountant and has held positions within various corporations including:

- Deputy General Manager for Deloitte & Touche (1978–1982)
- Deputy General Manager of Agricultural Finance Corporation (1982–1983)
- Financial Manager for Colgate Palmolive (1982–1987)
- Financial Manager of Delta Corporation (1987)
- Group Finance Director for Delta Corporation (1987–1992)
- Financial Manager of Chibuku Breweries (1989–1991)
- President of the Institute of Chartered Accountants of Zimbabwe (1990)
- General Manager of Chibuku Breweries (1991–1992)
- Management Consultant of Hunyani Holdings Ltd (1992–1994)
- National Reconstruction and Development Board chairman (1995)
- Partner of Management Consultancy, Kudenga & Co (1995–1999)
- Managing Director of Corporate Excellence (2000–present)
