= 2002 Zimbabwean presidential election =

- 9–11 March 2002
- Registered: 5,647,812
- Turnout: 55.44%
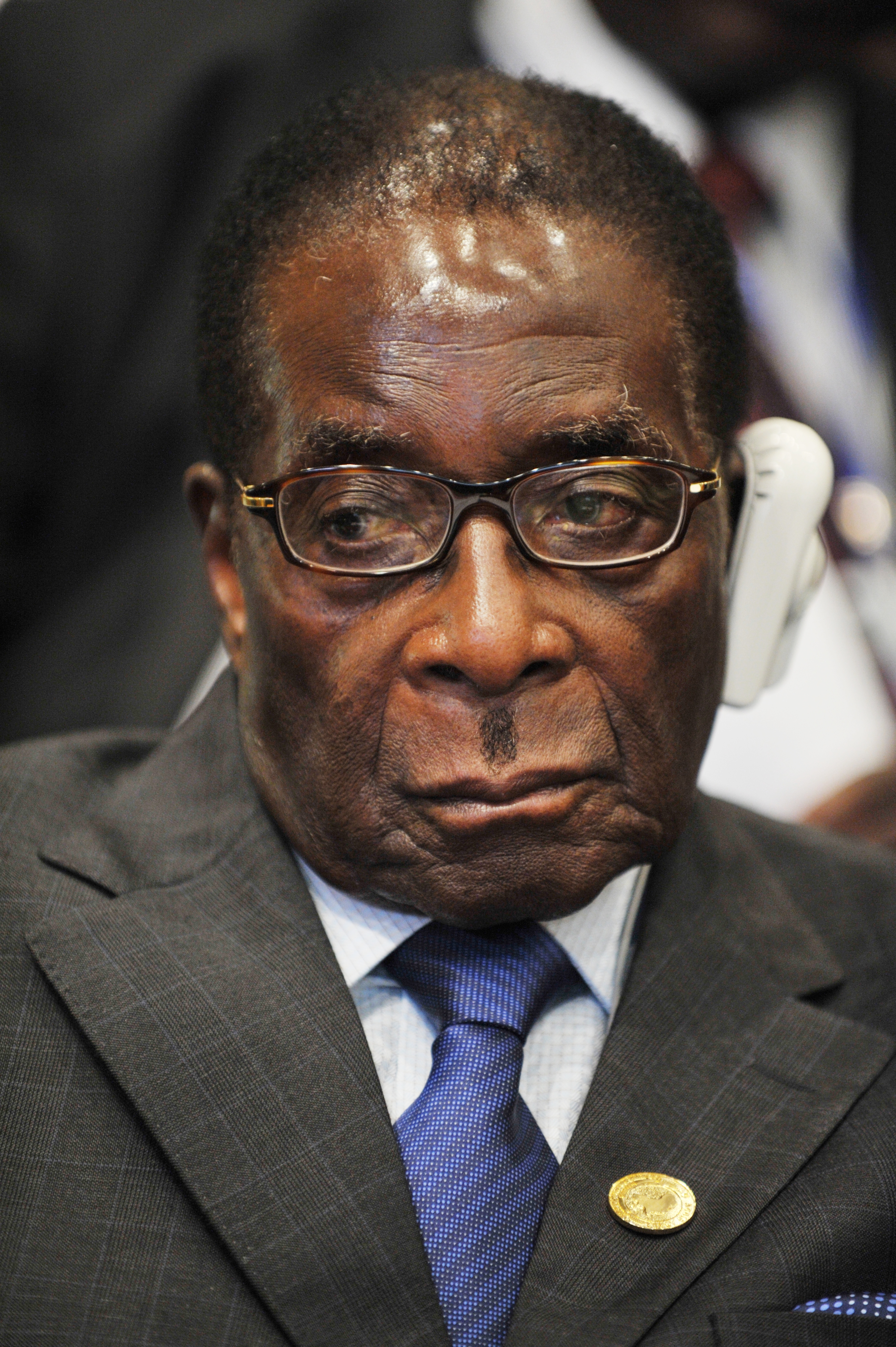

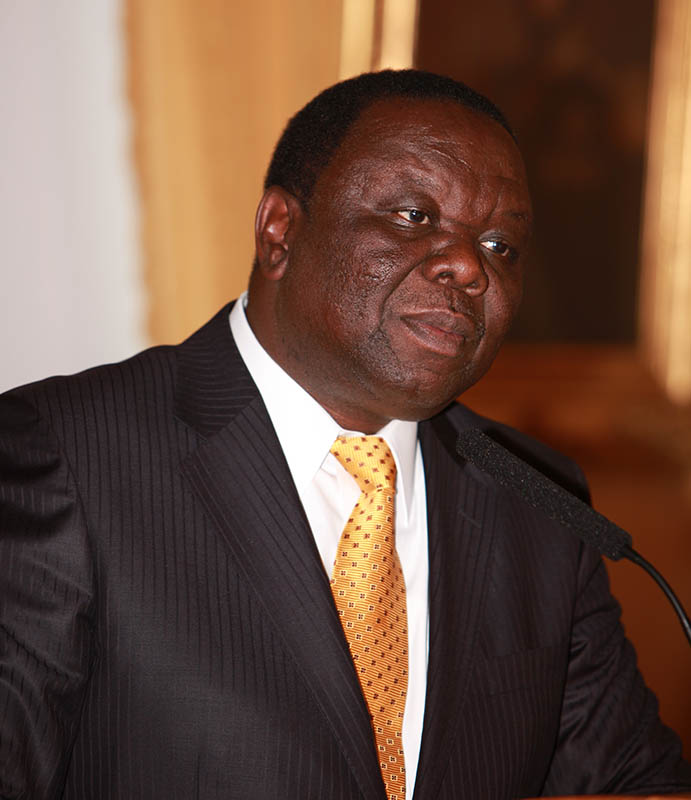
Nominee	Robert Mugabe	Morgan Tsvangirai
Party	ZANU–PF	MDC
Popular vote	1,685,212	1,258,401
Percentage	56.20%	41.96%
President before election
Robert Mugabe
ZANU–PF
Elected President
Robert Mugabe
ZANU–PF

Presidential elections were held in Zimbabwe between 9 and 11 March 2002. The elections were contested by the incumbent president Robert Mugabe, Movement for Democratic Change leader Morgan Tsvangirai, ZANU–Ndonga leader Wilson Kumbula, Shakespeare Maya of the National Alliance for Good Governance and independent candidate Paul Siwela. Although Mugabe won with 56.2% of the vote, it was the closest presidential election to date.

The elections were not free and fair, as they occurred under the electoral manipulation of the ZANU-PF party and intimidation of the opposition. Several members of the opposition party were murdered by the government in state sanctioned assassinations. Three members of Parliament, who were members of the opposition were assaulted by soldiers and police offices in what appeared to be a targeted attack ordered by the government. Amnesty International wrote "Freedom of expression came under increasing restrictions during the year. Journalists and lawyers were arbitrarily detained, beaten, tortured and threatened for reporting on political or human rights issues or representing the victims of human rights violations." The same report added "Zondiwa Dumukani, a 32-year-old driver working at the Blackfordby farm in Waterfalls on the outskirts of Harare, was reportedly beaten to death by a group of eight "war veterans" and ZANU-PF youths. According to reports, police officers in the area ignored the assault and did not try to intervene." During the build up to the election Zimbabwean human rights groups reported forty-eight deaths of opposition members caused by state violence. During the same period, Zimbabwean human rights groups reported "333 cases of torture and 533 of unlawful arrest or detention" noting that " In almost all cases, the victims are supporters of the MDC, farmworkers, farmers, and civil society activists such as students and trade unionists."

== Conduct ==
Although the Organisation of African Unity described the election as "transparent, credible, free and fair", the conduct of the election was strongly condemned by the Commonwealth, Norwegian observers, Zimbabwean opposition figures, the governments of Ghana, Sierra Leone, Kenya, Botswana, Malawi, India, Sri Lanka, Lesotho, Jamaica, Belize, Grenada as well as Western governments and media. Zimbabwe was consequently suspended from the Commonwealth for a year. However, France, as led by Jacques Chirac made a conscious decision to try and form an alliance with Mugabe in the wake of these events, leading to condemnation from other western governments. Chirac invited Mugabe to a conference in Paris shortly after the election, where Mugabe was lavishly hosted by the French government. The UK had previously tried to get the European Union to deny Mugabe the right to come to Europe, citing human rights abuses in Zimbabwe. Zimbabwean opposition leader Morgan Tsvangirai said it was "a slap in the face for the French Government or any government in Europe to be accommodating him." Ministers were said to be "furious" at the prospect of Grace Mugabe, the President's wife, returning to the stricken country with "crates of luxury goods" while Zimbabwe was in the middle of a self-inflicted crisis that resulted in mass starvation. A British minister remarked "The thought of Mugabe gorging himself on French food while his people starve is morally repugnant." The French government paid for Robert and Grace Mugabe to stay at the five-star Plaza Athénée Hotel. About the meeting the U.S. publication the Washington Post wrote: "Who would be irresponsible enough to lend legitimacy to Mugabe, a man whose brutal land-seizure tactics have reduced much of Zimbabwe to starvation? But you have probably guessed the answer: It is that friend of liberty, fraternity and equality -- the president of France."

The Khampepe Report, commissioned by South African president Thabo Mbeki, was commissioned at the time to investigate the fairness of the elections. The report said : However, having regard to all the circumstances, and in particular the cumulative substantial departures from international standards of free and fair elections found in Zimbabwe during the pre-election period, these elections, in our view, cannot be considered to be free and fair. This report was not released publicly for 12 years, after a lengthy legal battle by the Mail & Guardian.

Mugabe was sworn in for another term by Chief Justice Godfrey Chidyausiku on 17 March 2002 at State House in Harare.

== Results ==
Candidate	Party	Votes	%
Robert Mugabe	ZANU–PF	1,685,212	56.20
Morgan Tsvangirai	Movement for Democratic Change	1,258,401	41.96
Wilson Kumbula	ZANU–Ndonga	31,368	1.05
Shakespeare Maya	National Alliance for Good Governance	11,906	0.40
Paul Siwela	Independent	11,871	0.40
Total		2,998,758	100.00
Valid votes		2,998,758	95.78
Invalid/blank votes		132,155	4.22
Total votes		3,130,913	100.00
Registered voters/turnout		5,647,812	55.44
Source: African Elections Database
