= Norton (constituency) =

Constituency of the Parliament of Zimbabwe

- Constituency for the National Assembly of Zimbabwe
- Province: Mashonaland West
- Region: Norton

Current constituency
- Created: 2008
- Party: Citizens Coalition for Change
- Member(s): Richard Tsvangirai
- Created from: Manyame

Norton is a constituency represented in the National Assembly of the Parliament of Zimbabwe, located in Norton, Mashonaland West Province. It is currently represented by Richard Tsvangirai of the Citizens Coalition for Change since the 2023 election.

== Members ==
Election	Name	Party
2008	Edward Musumbu	MDC–T
2013	Christopher Mutsvangwa	ZANU–PF
2016 by-election	Temba Mliswa	Independent
2018	Temba Mliswa	Independent
2023	Richard Tsvangirai	Citizens Coalition for Change

== See also ==
- List of Zimbabwean parliamentary constituencies
