= Coalition of Democrats (Zimbabwe) =

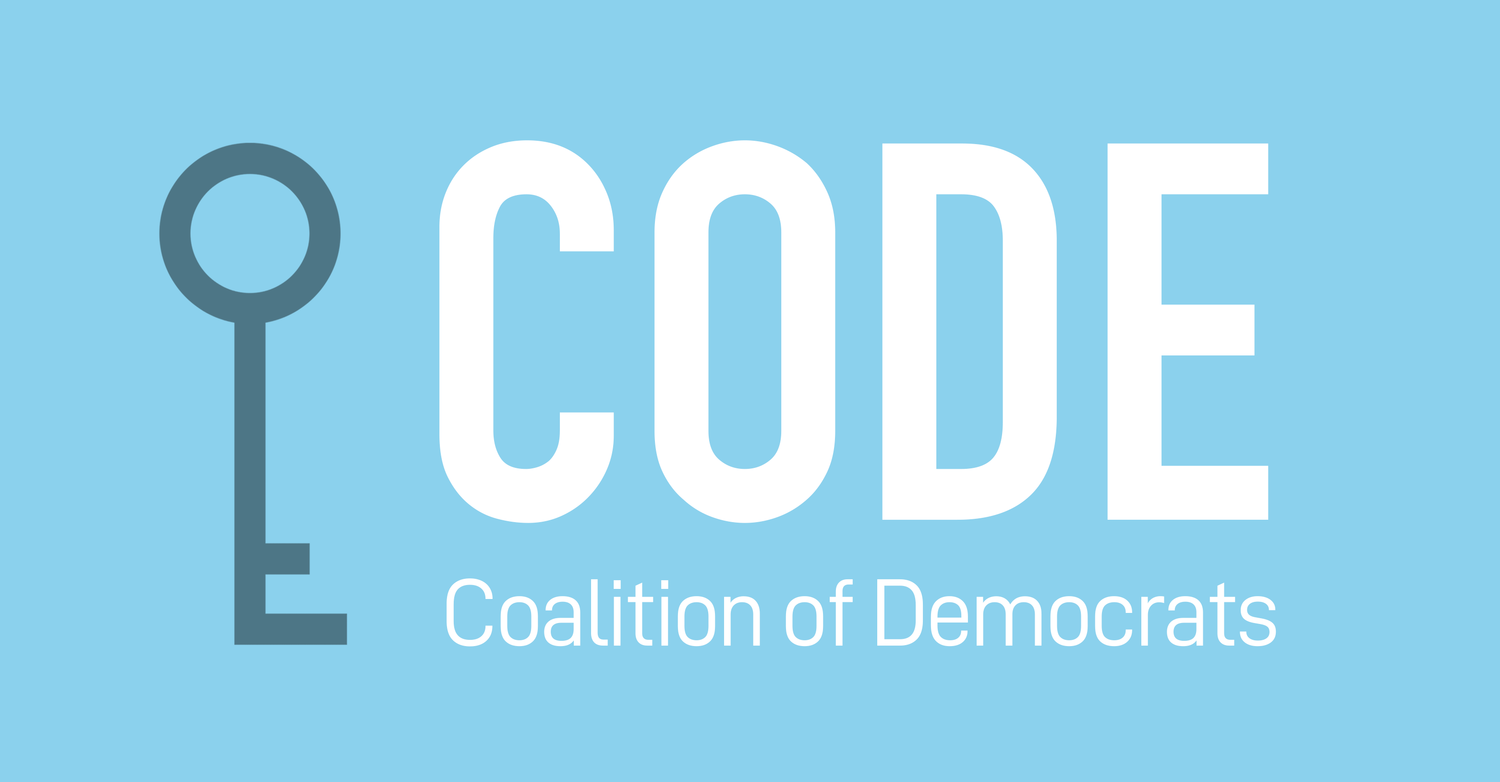
- Abbreviation: CODE
- President: Elton Mangoma
- Founded: 9 August 2017; 9 years ago
- Ideology: Pan-Africanism; Modern nationalism Social democracy
- Political position: Centre-left
- Colours: Light Blue
- House of Assembly: 0 / 280
- Senate: 0 / 80

The Coalition of Democrats (CODE) are an opposition faction within Zimbabwe which was formed on the 9 August 2017. The group endorsed Elton Mangoma as their presidential candidate in the 2018 General Election. The group is currently led by Mangoma following the Zimbabwe African People's Union's split from the bloc and Dumiso Dabengwa's subsequent resignation as the Chair of the group's Supreme Council on 18 April 2018.

== Coalition partners ==
CODE is a group made up of eight political parties which include:

- Renewal Democrats of Zimbabwe (RDZ)
- Progressive Democrats of Zimbabwe
- Zimbabweans United for Democracy
- Democratic Assembly for Restoration and Empowerment
- African Democratic Party
- Mavambo/Kusile/Dawn
- ZimFirst

== Former partners ==
On 18 April 2018, the Zimbabwe African People's Union (ZAPU) split from the bloc. ZAPU's then party leader Dumiso Dabengwa cited his party's irreconcilable differences with CODE over the former's ideology relating to national liberation.

== Ideology ==
The Coalition of Democrats officially follows three ideologies: Pan-Africanism, Social Democracy and Modern Nationalism. It actively endorses the African Union's vision 2063.

=== Modern nationalism ===
CODE defines modern nationalism as using and exploiting Zimbabwe's national resources to benefit all of the population. The coalition wishes to fulfil the aspirations of the Founding Zimbabwean Nationalists by ensuring that all Zimbabweans are treated equally.
