= Elias Mudzuri =

Zimbabwean engineer and politician

The Right Honourable Elias Mudzuri MP

Minister of Energy and Power Development of Zimbabwe
- In office 13 February 2009 – 2013
- Prime Minister: Morgan Tsvangirai

Mayor of Harare
- In office 1 April 2002 – April 2003
- Preceded by: Solomon Tawengwa
- Succeeded by: Sekesai Makwavarara

Personal details
- Born: Harare, Zimbabwe
- Party: Movement for Democratic Change-Tsvangirai
- Profession: Engineer

Elias Mudzuri is a Zimbabwean engineer and politician. Mudzuri was elected to a four-year term as Mayor of Harare, Zimbabwe, a city of 1.8 million, in March 2002. He was Acting president of Movement for Democratic Change (MDC-T).

Trained in Sierre Leone as a civil engineer, Mudzuri is a Fellow of the Zimbabwe Institution of Engineers. Before becoming mayor, he had worked in local government for 14 years. He is married to Jabu Mudzuri, a Swazi national, and the couple have five children. Mudzuri was a Mason Fellow at the Harvard Kennedy School at Harvard University and also holds Masters in Public Administration from the university.

Mudzuri is a member of the Movement for Democratic Change, the opposition party led by Morgan Tsvangirai. His election as mayor came about after Harare's citizens sued the national government for autonomous elections, required by the nation's constitution but never held. From 1999 forward, President Mugabe had appointed ministers of the national government to run local government in Harare, which was illegal under the constitution.

On 15 September 2020, Mudzuri tested positive for COVID-19.

== Power struggle with the Mugabe administration ==
Mudzuri defeated ZANU-PF candidate Amos Midzi in the March 2002 mayoral election by a large margin, receiving 262,275 votes against 56,796 votes for Midzi.

Almost immediately after that election, a power struggle between Minister of Local Government Ignatius Chombo and Mudzuri ensued. Chombo blocked badly needed funds for local improvements and development. In March 2003, young Zanu-PF supporters toyi-toyi'd around Town House – Harare's city hall – chanting: "Mudzuri should be beaten up, he must be killed and he must be removed."

On 11 January 2003 the national police assaulted and arrested Mudzuri while he met with Harare residents. More than 20 city officials and residents were held at that time.

At the end of April 2003 the national government suspended Mudzuri from his position as Executive Mayor without pay, and locked him out of his office. His deputy mayor, Sekesai Makwavarara, was appointed as acting mayor by the central government.

== Appointment to Unity cabinet ==
On 10 February 2009, Mudzuri was selected by Prime Minister Morgan Tsvangirai to sit as minister of Energy and Power Development in the unity coalition cabinet.
