= Sekesai Makwavarara =

Zimbabwean politician

Sekesai Makwavarara is a former deputy mayor and acting mayor of Harare, the capital of Zimbabwe. She began her work for council in 2002 for Mabvuku as a member of the Movement for Democratic Change party. Initially a member of ZANU-PF, she was temporarily a member of the Movement for Democratic Change. During her tenure on the Mabvuku city council, she served under deputy mayor Elias Mudzuri until she was appointed acting mayor following Mudzuri's forced deposition by the national government. After the MDC party launched a probe which identified her as corrupt, she rejoined the ZANU-PF, then resigned from this position in 2004. In 2006, she was appointed head of a commission that ran the Harare City Council's affairs until December 2008.
