= Council of Ministers of Zimbabwe =

The Council of Ministers was a historic body of Zimbabwean government ministers, conceptualised as a separate body from the Cabinet according to the agreement reached at the conclusion of negotiations between presidential rivals Morgan Tsvangirai and Robert Mugabe leading to the Zimbabwe Government of National Unity of 2009.

While the Cabinet is chaired by the president and is the policy decision-making body, the Council of Ministers was headed by the prime minister as a liaison office; in addition, the council will assist in the formulation of policies, the supervision of government ministries by the prime minister and the implementation of cabinet policies.

The post was abolished under the 2013 Constitution.
