= Morgan Tsvangirai House =

Coordinates: 17.8291°S 31.0483°E

- Interactive map of the Morgan Tsvangirai House area
- Former names: Harvest House

General information
- Location: 44 Nelson Mandela Avenue, Harare, Zimbabwe
- Owner: Movement for Democratic Change

Technical details
- Floor count: 6

Morgan Richard Tsvangirai House is a building in Harare, Zimbabwe, that is the national headquarters of the now defunct Movement for Democratic Change political party. The building was known as Harvest House until 2018, when it was renamed in honor of the party's late leader, Morgan Tsvangirai.

== History ==
During the 1950s, the building was home to the consulate general of Belgium in Southern Rhodesia.

== Overview ==
Situated in uptown Harare, Harvest House is the center of the MDC, physically and politically. It has offices for all the departments, the secretaries, assistants and advisors, and 2 conference rooms in which the MDC officials address the press or conduct meetings. Its address is 44 Nelson Mandela Avenue and Angwa Street in Harare.

== Description ==
The six-story building has two green concrete fronts, connected on the inside. The ground floor windows in front are protected by metal grates and vertical blinds. It has two poles on the front on which the Zimbabwe flag and the MDC flag fly.

According to the MDC constitution:

"1.4 The party is headquartered at Harvest House, No.44 Nelson Mandela Avenue, Harare and shall have offices at such other places as may be determined from time to time by the National Council."

== The Party Secretariat ==
The MDC Party Secretariat is located at the Harvest House and is headed by a Chief of Staff and staffed by a mix of career servants and special advisers. It provides the party with support and advice on policy, communications, departments and public/media relations.

Members of staff at Harvest House are not allowed to hold any position in any structure in the MDC.

== Security ==
Strong security measures are present, if not always visible. Three guards customarily man the front door. More covert security measures exist: for example, plain-clothesmen guard the roofline above the street and in the vicinity of the building itself.

Despite these measures, security has been seriously breached more than a hundred times.

=== March 2006 raid ===
In March 2006 following the arrest of MDC President Morgan Tsvangirai, heavily armed police descended on Harvest House, they ransacked the building, breaking furniture, fixtures, destroying documents, they broke toilet seats and cisterns, they broke doors and several windows left offices of MDC officials strewn with papers, ripped telephone lines and took away computers. According to press reports the debris resembled a scene of bomb attack.

=== May 2007 raid ===
In May 2007, police raided Harvest House and arrested as many as 200 activists. The activists were taken away in police vans, even though the police had no search warrant.

The raid came a day after police extended a ban on political rallies.

=== April 2008 raid ===
Police raided Harvest House on 25 April 2008, following the controversial March 2008 presidential and parliamentary elections. The Herald reported that 215 people had been arrested in the raid on Harvest House. Police spokesman Wayne Bvudzijena said that the police were looking for individuals who had engaged in violence following the election, specifically referring to arson attacks on "four homesteads, tobacco barns and fowl runs belonging to Zanu-PF supporters in the Mayo resettlement area in Manicaland on April 16"; he said that those responsible for the attacks were suspected to have taken refuge in Harvest House. According to Bvudzijena, the police were screening the arrested individuals and those who had not committed a crime would be released. The MDC said that the raid involved about 250 policemen and that about 300 people in Harvest House were taken away, including people who were taking refuge from violence committed by ZANU-PF supporters and people who were seeking medical treatment at Harvest House. The party also alleged that its supporters were beaten during the raid, and, according to the MDC, the police said that they were searching for "the documents that the party has that form the basis of our claim that we won the election... Further they have taken all computers and equipment that was used by the MDC at the MDC's election command centre." MDC spokesman Nelson Chamisa said that the police had no search warrant and that the "victims of violence" taken away by the police included women and children; he also said that MDC staff at Harvest House were arrested.

== Media relations ==
Press briefings are traditionally given by the Secretary for Information and Publicity.
