= Richard Tsvangirai =

Zimbabwean politician

MP for Norton
- Incumbent
- Assumed office 2023

Personal details
- Party: Citizens Coalition for Change
- Parent: Morgan Tsvangirai (father)

Richard Tsvangirai is a Zimbabwean politician from the Citizens Coalition for Change. In the 2023 Zimbabwean general election he was elected to the National Assembly for the Norton constituency.

== Family ==
His father was prime minister Morgan Tsvangirai.

== Personal life ==
In 2024, he survived a car accident.
