= Detention of U.S. and UK diplomats in Zimbabwe =

2008 diplomatic incident

On June 5, 2008, diplomatic staff from both the United States and the United Kingdom were attacked and detained by Zimbabwean security forces in Bindura, a town north of Harare. Five Americans and four British diplomats were among the victims. Additional diplomats from the European Union and Japan, the Netherlands, and Tanzania were also detained.

The diplomats, including the American ambassador, James D. McGee, were investigating violence in the country, as the next round of the presidential election started. They were travelling to meet opposition activists who were accusing the ruling ZANU–PF party of torture when the Zimbabwean forces stopped them at a roadblock. According to McGree, police slashed tyres, confiscated phones, and threatened to burn the cars with them inside unless they agreed to go to a nearby station. The British car managed to flee from the vehicles by ramming one of the cars. The diplomats were later all released the same day, though a Zimbabwean driver for the US embassy was beaten up in custody.

According to Bright Matonga, Zimbabwe's deputy information minister, the diplomats had been halted after fleeing an opposition rally which had turned violent.

== International reaction ==
=== United Kingdom ===
The British Secretary of State for Foreign and Commonwealth Affairs David Miliband said:

"They were going about their business properly registered as diplomats. I am pleased to say they are all safe and sound and unharmed, and there was no violence involved. This gives us a window onto the lives of ordinary Zimbabweans, because this sort of intimidation is something that is suffered daily, especially by those working with opposition groups. It is a window into lives which, in some cases, are marked by brutal intimidation, by torture and, in 53 cases documented in the past few weeks, by death."

=== United States ===
State Department spokesman Sean McCormack said:

"It's outrageous and unacceptable. While the immediate incident has been resolved it will not be forgotten. This did not just happen. This wasn't 40 people standing by the side of the road who decided to take this on."

McCormack also stated that the US intended to take this to the UN Security Council.
