= National Alliance for Good Governance =

Political party in Zimbabwe

The National Alliance for Good Governance is a political party in Zimbabwe. Its candidate, Shaka Maya, won 0.5% at the presidential elections of 9–11 March 2002. After the last legislative elections, 31 March 2005, the party remained without parliamentary representation.
