= Movement for Democratic Change Alliance =

- Abbreviation: MDC-A
- Leader: Douglas Mwonzora
- Chairperson: Morgan Komichi
- Deputy: Elias Mudzuru
- Founded: 6 August 2017
- Ideology: Social democracy
- Political position: Centre-left
- International affiliation: Progressive Alliance
- National Assembly: 0 / 280

The Movement for Democratic Change Alliance is an electoral coalition of seven political parties formed to contest Zimbabwe's 2018 general election. After the 2018 election, a dispute arose over the use of the name MDC Alliance leading the MDC Alliance leader Nelson Chamisa to found the Citizens Coalition for Change.

== History ==
Three of the member parties were splinters from the original Movement for Democratic Change and each other. The bloc was formed to contest the 2018 election. The MDC Alliance was led by Nelson Chamisa who replaced Morgan Tsvangirai as President of the MDC-T after Tsvangirai died on the 14 February 2018 after a long fight against colon cancer. On 30 July 2018, the alliance went head to head with the Emmerson Mnangagwa-led ZANU–PF in Zimbabwe's historic elections. The alliance was narrowly edged by ZANU–PF in the presidential election, with Mnangagwa receiving 50.8% of the vote to MDC Alliance's Nelson Chamisa's 44.3%. The election results have received international attention as possible fraud.

After the election, the three member parties who were splinters of the original MDC (MDC-T, MDC-N and PDP) reunited to form a single political party under the name MDC-Alliance. Nelson Chamisa was elected president of the party at the MDC Congress held in May 2019. On 28 May 2020, the court ruled that MDC-A was a legal party.

In September 2021, Douglas Mwonzora, the leader of a splinter faction of the MDC-T, announced that the MDC-T would use the name MDC Alliance in forthcoming by-elections.

In January 2022, Chamisa founded Citizens Coalition For Change. He is backed by Welshman Ncube and Tendai Biti.

== Member parties ==
- Movement for Democratic Change – Tsvangirai (MDC-T)
- Transform Zimbabwe, led by Jacob Ngarivhume
- Zimbabwe People First, led by Agrippa Mutambara
- Zimbabwe African National Union – Ndonga
- Multi-Racial Democrats
- Movement for Democratic Change – Ncube, led by Welshman Ncube (until 2022)
- People's Democratic Party, led by Tendai Biti (until 2022)

== Electoral history ==
=== Presidential elections ===
Election	Party candidate	Votes	%	Result
2018	Nelson Chamisa	2,600,000	44.3%	Lost ✗

=== House of Assembly elections ===
Election	Party leader	Votes	%	Seats	+/–	Position	Result
2018	Nelson Chamisa	1,624,875	34.33%	88 / 270	▲88	▲2nd	Opposition

=== Senate elections ===
Election	Party leader	Votes	%	Seats	+/–	Position	Result
2018	Nelson Chamisa			25 / 80	Steady	▲2nd	Opposition
