= Tendai Biti =

Zimbabwean politician

Tendai Laxton Biti
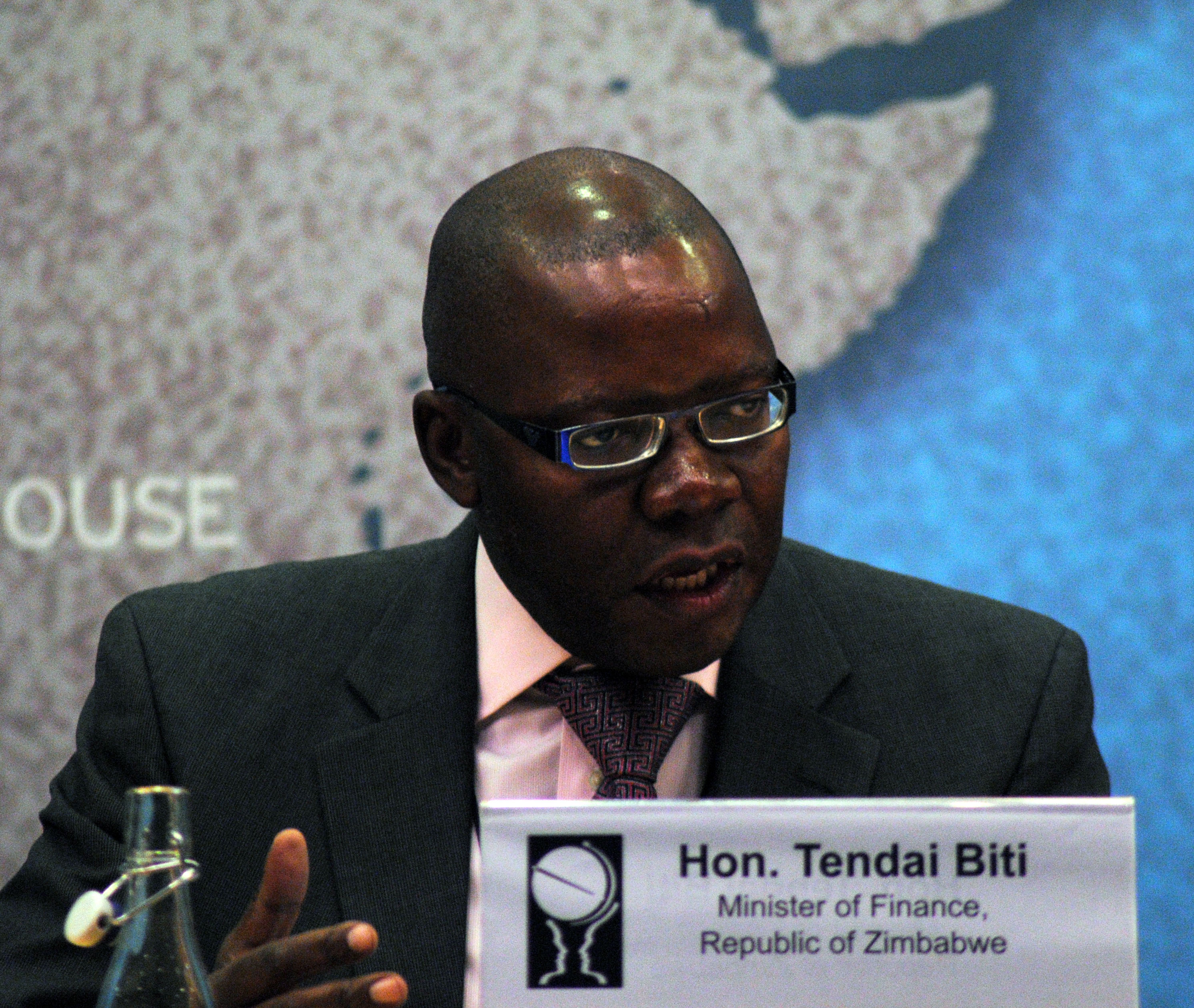
- Biti at Chatham House in 2013

Vice President of the Citizens Coalition for Change
- Incumbent
- Assumed office 24 May 2019
- President: Nelson Chamisa
- Preceded by: Elias Mudzuri

President of the People's Democratic Party
- In office 10 September 2015 – 2017
- Preceded by: Position established
- Succeeded by: Lucia Matibenga (Interim)

Minister of Finance of Zimbabwe
- In office 13 February 2009 – 10 September 2013
- President: Robert Mugabe
- Prime Minister: Morgan Tsvangirai
- Preceded by: Patrick Chinamasa (Acting)
- Succeeded by: Patrick Chinamasa

Secretary-General of the Movement for Democratic Change – Tsvangirai
- In office 31 March 2005 – 29 April 2014
- President: Morgan Tsvangirai
- Preceded by: Position established
- Succeeded by: Douglas Mwonzora

Member of Parliament for Harare East
- In office 2000 – 29 April 2014
- Preceded by: Tirivanhu Mudariki
- Succeeded by: Terence Mukupe

Secretary-General of the Movement for Democratic Change
- In office 13 January 2000 – 31 March 2005
- President: Morgan Tsvangirai
- Preceded by: Office established
- Succeeded by: Office abolished

Personal details
- Born: 6 August 1966 (age 60) Dzivarasekwa, Rhodesia (now Zimbabwe)
- Party: Movement for Democratic Change (1999–2005); Movement for Democratic Change - Tsvangirai (2005–2015); People's Democratic Party (2015–2017) Movement for Democratic Change - Tsvangirai (2017–2022)
- Children: 5
- Education: University of Zimbabwe

Tendai Laxton Biti (born 6 August 1966) is a Zimbabwean politician who served as Finance Minister of Zimbabwe from 2009 to 2013. He is the second Vice President of Citizens Coalition for Change. He was the Secretary-General of the Movement for Democratic Change and the subsequent Movement for Democratic Change – Tsvangirai (MDC-T) political parties and a Member of Parliament for Harare East until he was expelled from the party and recalled from parliament in mid-2014, before winning the seat again in 2018.

== Early life ==
Biti was born in Dzivarasekwa, Harare, and he is the eldest in a family of 6 children. From 1980 to 1985 he attended Goromonzi High School, where he was appointed deputy head boy in 1985. He enrolled in the University of Zimbabwe law school as a freshman in 1986. In 1988 and 1989, Biti was Secretary General of the University of Zimbabwe Student Representative Council, with Terry Mhungu as SRC President, which led student protests against government censorship in academia. After school, he joined the Law firm Honey and Blackenberg, where he became the youngest partner by the age of 26. Biti lost his father in his early 30s.

== Political career ==
In 1999 he helped found the MDC. He was elected Member of Parliament for the Harare East constituency in 2000. During the Fifth Parliament he served as a member of the Parliament Portfolio Committee on Lands, Agriculture, Water Development, Rural Resources and Resettlement and that on Defence and Home Affairs. In March 2005 he retained the constituency. He serves in the Portfolio Committee on Budget, Finance and Economic Development and is currently the MDC's Secretary General. In his legal career Biti has handled labour and human rights litigation representing large trade unions such as the Post and Telecommunications Trade Union.

He was arrested in 2007 with many others, including MDC leader Morgan Tsvangirai, after a prayer rally in the Harare township of Highfield.

On 16 June 2007, Biti and Welshman Ncube met with Justice Minister Patrick Chinamasa and Labor Minister Nicholas Goche, in Pretoria, South Africa. South African President Thabo Mbeki, appointed by the Southern African Development Community, presided over the negotiations which sought to end sanctions on Zimbabwe top ZANU-PF leaders or top government officials.

=== 2008 elections ===
Biti was re-elected to the House of Assembly from Harare East in the March 2008 parliamentary election. According to official results, he received 8,377 votes against 2,587 for the ZANU-PF candidate. In the period following the election, he stayed outside of Zimbabwe (mainly in South Africa), along with Tsvangirai, amidst a post-electoral situation that was marked by serious violence against MDC supporters.

=== Arrest ===
Biti returned to Zimbabwe on 12 June 2008 and was immediately arrested at the airport in Harare. Before his departure from Johannesburg, Biti said that he had already learned that he would be arrested, but maintained that his only crime was "fighting for democracy" and said that it was necessary for him to return to participate in the MDC's struggle. Following Biti's arrest, police spokesman Wayne Bvudzijena said that he would be charged with treason, based on an MDC document about changing the government. This document, which was called "The Transition Strategy" and was said to have been written by Biti on 25 March, included purported plans to rig the election in favour of the MDC. Bvudzijena said that Biti would additionally be charged with making false statements "prejudicial to the state" due to his announcement of election results prior to their release by the Electoral Commission. United States Ambassador James McGee expressed deep concern on behalf of the US government, saying that the document in question was an unobjectionable statement of the MDC's plans and goals; according to McGee, another, more extreme version of the document existed, but it was forged. Biti's lawyer also claimed that the material in question was forged.

On 13 June, Biti's lawyers said that they had not been allowed to meet with him, and they filed an urgent application with the High Court on the same day. The MDC said that it was "deeply worried" about Biti's welfare and that it had sent a team to police stations across Harare, hoping to determine where he was being held. He appeared in court on 14 June.

Biti's home was searched by the police on 16 June, although the police did not take anything out of the home. His lawyer, Lewis Uriri, said that Biti had been interrogated for a full 24 hours after his arrest; Uriri also said that he would seek an order from the High Court to release Biti on the grounds that he had been held without charge for more than the allowed 48-hour period.

Biti again appeared in court on 18 June; however, this hearing was postponed to the next day because the power failed, meaning that the hearing could not be recorded. He was charged on 19 June. He faced four charges: "treason, communicating falsehoods prejudicial to the State, insulting President Mugabe and causing disaffection among the defence forces".. Prosecutors argued against granting bail to Biti, noting that the charges against him were so serious that he could be executed. The defence submitted an application to have the charges thrown out, but on 20 June magistrate Mishrod Guvamombe dismissed this application, saying that he believed there was "reasonable suspicion that the accused committed the said offence". Biti's next court appearance was set for 7 July, and Guvamombe ordered that he remain in custody until then.

On 26 June, Biti was granted bail at one trillion Zimbabwean dollars; he was also required to surrender his home's title deeds and to report to the police on a weekly basis. Biti's lawyers later filed a petition asking for the return of his passport so that he could attend talks between the parties in South Africa, and as a result his passport was returned to him on 9 July, enabling him to go. He led the MDC-Tsvangirai delegation to the talks, which began in Pretoria on 10 July, although according to Tsvangirai the purpose of this was only to set the MDC-Tsvangirai's conditions for participating in the talks, not to actually participate in them.

Uriri applied for the removal of Biti's remand on the grounds that a trial date should have been set and the police investigation should have been completed. On 27 August 2008, Chioniso Mutongi, a magistrate in Harare, rejected this request, saying that Biti had not been on remand long enough for its removal to be appropriate.

In 2018 following Zimbabwe's disputed elections, he was arrested and denied asylum in Zambia.

=== Appointment to Government of National Unity ===
On 10 February 2009, MDC leader and Prime Minister-designate Morgan Tsvangirai announced the appointment of Biti as Finance Minister in the Government of National Unity. Though he has no known history in financial and economic matters, analysts suggest that Tsvangirai really had no other option considering Biti's position in the MDC. In addition, he is known to drive a hard bargain and could be the best person to deal with the Zanu-PF controlled public service. He was sworn in alongside other Ministers on 13 February 2009 in Harare.

=== Return to legal career ===
On 20 November 2013, Biti announced he would be opening a new law firm. The firm was to specialize in international finance law as well as domestic constitutional issues.

=== Return to politics ===
Biti fell out with Tsvangirai in 2014, resulting in Tsvangirai announcing Biti's expulsion in April 2014. In 2015 Biti joined other disaffected MDC-T members in a breakaway group, MDC-Renewal, becoming its secretary-general. In September 2015, MDC-Renewal launched as a separate party, the People's Democratic Party, and Biti was elected president of the new party.

In 2020, Biti criticized a three-member delegation from South Africa that was sent to investigate human rights abuses, when they returned to their country without speaking to opposition groups.

In February 2019 he was convicted of contravening the Electoral Act for illegally announcing purported results for the 2018 presidential election in Zimbabwe. He was fined $200.

In February 2022, Biti was detained by police for several hours while campaigning for the by-elections in Harare, a spokeswoman for his party said.

Political offices
| Preceded by Tirivanhu Mudariki | Member of the House of Assembly for Harare East; 2000–present | Incumbent |
