= 2018 Zimbabwean general election =

- 30 July 2018
- Presidential election
- Registered: 5,695,936 (▼3.30%)
- Turnout: 85.19%
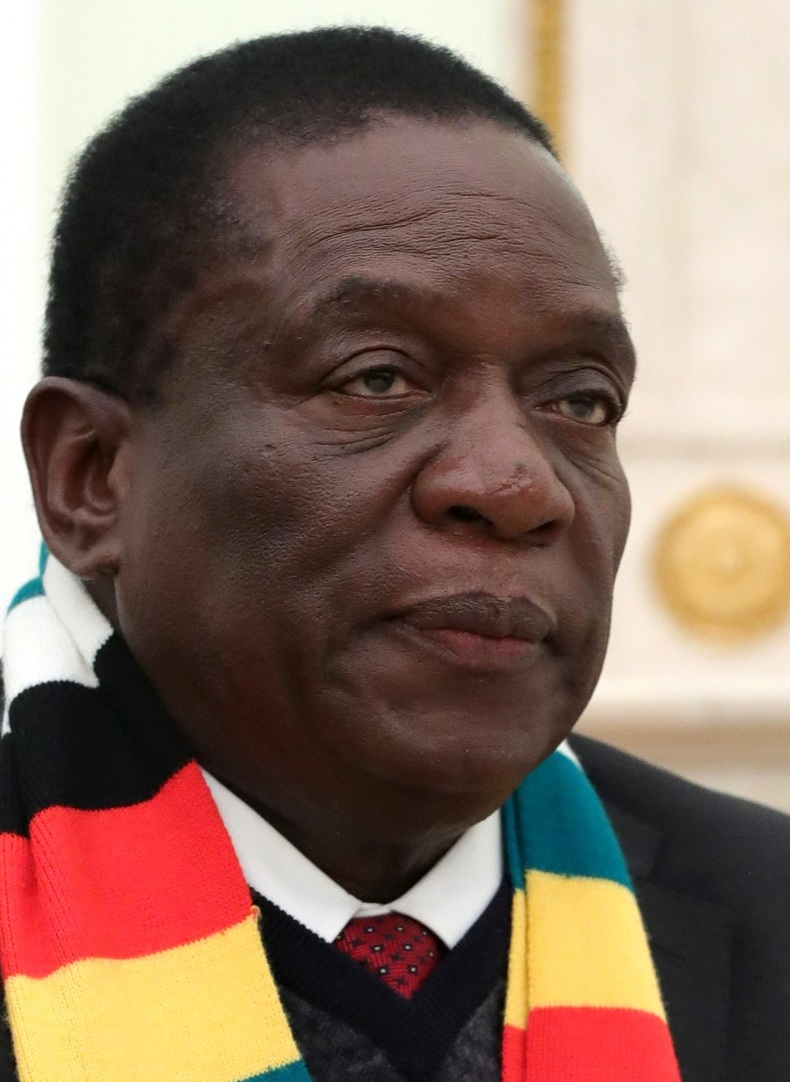

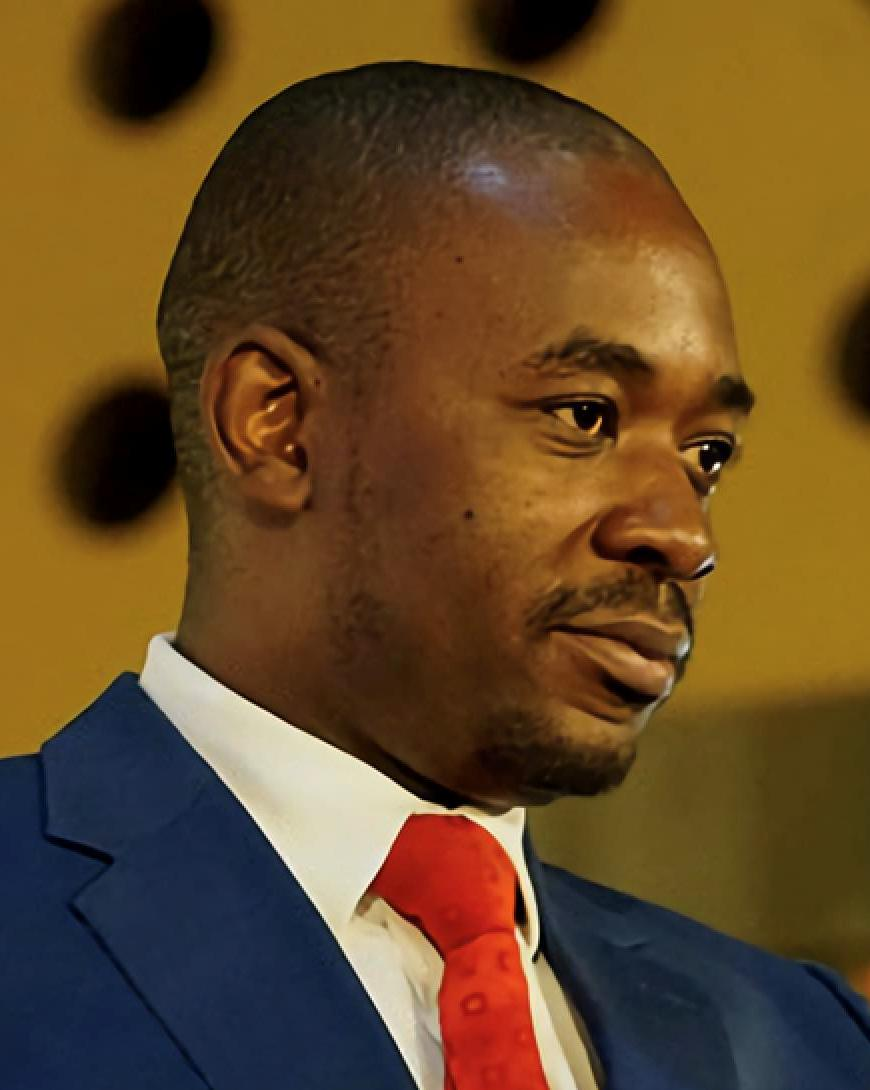
| Candidate | Emmerson Mnangagwa | Nelson Chamisa |
| Party | ZANU–PF | MDC Alliance |
| Popular vote | 2,461,745 | 2,150,343 |
| Percentage | 51.50% | 44.99% |
President before election
Emmerson Mnangagwa
ZANU–PF
Elected President
Emmerson Mnangagwa
ZANU–PF
- National Assembly
- All 270 seats in the National Assembly; 136 seats needed for a majority
| Party | Leader | Vote % | Seats | +/– |
|---|---|---|---|---|
| ZANU–PF | Emmerson Mnangagwa | 52.36 | 179 | −18 |
| MDC Alliance | Nelson Chamisa | 34.62 | 88 | New |
| MDC-T | Thokozani Khuphe | 3.04 | 1 | −69 |
| NPF | Eunice Sandi Moyo | 1.13 | 1 | New |
| Independents | Temba Mliswa | 5.08 | 1 | 0 |
This lists parties that won seats. See the complete results below.
- Senate
- 60 of the 80 seats in the Senate; 41 seats needed for a majority
| Party | Leader | Seats | +/– |
|---|---|---|---|
| ZANU–PF | Emmerson Mnangagwa | 35 | −2 |
| MDC Alliance | Nelson Chamisa | 24 | New |
| MDC-T | Thokozani Khupe | 1 | −20 |
This lists parties that won seats. See the complete results below.
- Maps

General elections were held in Zimbabwe on 30 July 2018 to elect the President and members of both houses of Parliament. Held eight months after the 2017 coup d'état, the election was the first since the start of black majority rule in which former President Robert Mugabe was not a candidate.

ZANU–PF, the country's ruling party, went into the election with majorities in both the National Assembly and the Senate. The main opposition, the Movement for Democratic Change – Tsvangirai, contested the election as part of the MDC Alliance, a coalition that included the MDC–T and six smaller parties. The election gave ZANU–PF control of both houses in the 9th Parliament of Zimbabwe, though with reduced majorities in each. The MDC Alliance gained seats in both houses, closely corresponding to ZANU–PF's losses.

In the presidential election Emmerson Mnangagwa, who became president as a result of the 2017 coup ran for election as the ZANU–PF candidate. Morgan Tsvangirai, the MDC–T leader who was expected to run against him, died in February 2018 and Nelson Chamisa, the new party leader, replaced him as the MDC Alliance candidate. The Zimbabwe Electoral Commission announced Mnangagwa as the winner with 50.8% of the vote and gave Chamisa's 44.3%, giving Mnangagwa the majority needed to avoid a runoff. The announced results were disputed by MDC alliance and critiqued internationally. Mnangagwa won six of the country's ten provinces, while Chamisa won four, including the two metropolitan provinces, Harare and Bulawayo. It was the closest since 2008 that an opposition party had come to breaking ZANU–PF's 38-year hold on power.

== Background ==
The likelihood of the elections taking place was called into doubt following the 2017 coup. On 22 November 2017, a ZANU–PF spokesman said that Emmerson Mnangagwa would serve out the remainder of Robert Mugabe's term before the elections due to be held; during or before September 2018. On 20 March 2018, Mnangagwa said he was looking forward to holding elections in July 2018. In May, 30 July was set as the date of the election.

== Electoral system ==
The President of Zimbabwe is elected using the two-round system.

The 270 members of the National Assembly consist of 210 members elected in single-member constituencies and 60 women elected by proportional representation in ten six-seat constituencies based on the country's provinces. Voters cast a single vote, which is counted for both forms of election. The 80 members of the Senate include 60 members elected from ten six-member constituencies (also based on the provinces) by proportional representation using party lists; the lists must have a woman at the top and alternate between men and women. The other 20 seats include two reserved for people with disabilities and 18 for traditional chiefs.

According to the Constitution of Zimbabwe, the elections are required to be held before the official expiry date of the current parliamentary term, which was due to end on 21 August 2018.

== Presidential candidates ==
In 2015 long-term President Robert Mugabe announced that he would run for another term in 2018, and was adopted as the ZANU–PF candidate despite the fact that he would have been 94 at the time of the elections. Following the events of a military coup d'état in November 2017 and his deposition as leader of ZANU–PF, Mugabe resigned amidst parliamentary impeachment hearings on 21 November 2017. His successor Mnangagwa was chosen as the ZANU–PF candidate shortly after taking office. On 29 July 2018 Mugabe announced he would not support Emmerson Mnangagwa or the ZANU–PF party.

It was unknown whether long-time opposition leader Morgan Tsvangirai would have run in the elections following an announcement on 6 February 2018 which stated that Tsvangirai was critically ill and an MDC party source said "we should brace for the worst". Tsvangirai subsequently died on 14 February. Nelson Chamisa replaced Tsvangirai as the MDC candidate.

On 20 October 2017, the Coalition of Democrats or CODE, a group formed by nine political parties, nominated the leader of the Renewal Democrats of Zimbabwe, Elton Mangoma, to be their presidential candidate in the election.

Joice Mujuru, previously the Vice President of ZANU–PF before being ousted from the party in 2014, also registered her candidacy. Former Deputy Prime Minister Thokozani Khuphe, who leads a breakaway faction of the MDC after falling out with Nelson Chamisa, was also a candidate.

In total 23 candidates stood for election.

== Conduct ==
On 18 January 2018 Mnangagwa spoke to the Financial Times in an interview, in which he invited the EU, UN and the Commonwealth to send missions to Zimbabwe in order to monitor the elections. On 29 July 2018, former President Mugabe gave a surprise press conference during which he stated he would not vote for Mnangagwa and ZANU–PF, the party he founded and led for decades. Instead, he expressed the wish to vote for his long-time rival party, the Movement for Democratic Change (MDC) led by Nelson Chamisa.

The credibility of the elections was questioned by both Zimbabwean citizens and the international community. The opposition party claimed that people aged 141 are registered to vote, and in one instance a single address had over 100 registered voters. Academic Tony Reeler argued people should boycott the poll, otherwise they would legitimise the 2017 coup. Opposition leader Nelson Chamisa indicated that his party would participate in the election, but requested the intervention of the Southern African Development Community and African Union. The Zimbabwe Republic Police were accused of requiring officers to cast postal ballots in front of their supervisors, which is contrary to electoral law, which requires them to be a secret ballot. The Zimbabwe Electoral Commission (ZEC) removed ghost voters and duplicate voters. In 2015, the ZEC said that Diaspora voting would be allowed in the 2018 election, but Mnangagwa ruled this out. Elmar Brok claimed that ZANU–PF transported people to vote in an area in which they did not live.

On 1 August, the opposition accused the government of rigging the vote. Just after the elections, supporters of ZANU–PF attacked houses of some MDC members. In subsequent riots by MDC supporters, the army opened fire and killed three people, while three others died of their injuries the following day.

Although the election process was peaceful, the main opposition party MDC Alliance claimed that Zanu PF and ZEC rigged the presidential election results to announce Emmerson Mnangagwa the winner. The party claimed that there was manipulation of figures which did not tally with what was recorded on V11 forms issued at each polling station.

== Opinion polls ==
| Date(s) | Polling organisation | Sample size | Turnout | Mnangagwa | Chamisa | Undecided | Lead |
|---|---|---|---|---|---|---|---|
| 30 July 2018 | 2018 election Results | N/A | 70% | 50.8% | 44.3% | N/A | 6.5% |
| July 2018 | Afrobarometer | 2,400 | N/A | 40% | 37% | 20% | 3% |
| June 2018 | Afrobarometer | N/A | 85% | 42% | 31% | 26% | 11% |

== Results ==
On 1 August, the Zimbabwe Electoral Commission released preliminary results which show that the ruling party ZANU–PF had won the majority of seats in parliament. On 3 August, the Commission declared incumbent President Emmerson Mnangagwa the winner with just over 50% of the vote. This was the closest that an opposition party had come to ending ZANU–PF's hold on power since 2008, when Tsvangirai led the field in the first round and forced Mugabe into a runoff (from which he subsequently withdrew due to intimidation and violence by pro-Mugabe supporters), while the MDC-T won a plurality of seats in the House of Assembly.

=== President ===
Presidential election results map. Mnangagwa Chamisa

| Candidate | Party | Votes | % |
|---|---|---|---|
| Emmerson Mnangagwa | ZANU–PF | 2,461,745 | 51.50 |
| Nelson Chamisa | Movement for Democratic Change Alliance | 2,150,343 | 44.99 |
| Thokozani Khupe | MDC–Tsvangirai (Khupe) | 45,582 | 0.95 |
| Joseph Makamba Busha | FreeZim Congress | 17,551 | 0.37 |
| Nkosana Moyo | Alliance for People's Agenda | 15,235 | 0.32 |
| Evaristo Chikanga | Rebuild Zimbabwe | 13,140 | 0.27 |
| Joice Mujuru | People's Rainbow Coalition | 12,885 | 0.27 |
| Hlabangana Kwanele | Republican Party of Zimbabwe | 9,457 | 0.20 |
| Blessing Kasiyamhuru | Zimbabwe Partnership for Prosperity | 7,014 | 0.15 |
| William Mugadza | Bethel Christian Party | 5,894 | 0.12 |
| Divine Mhambi | National Alliance of Patriotic and Democratic Republicans | 4,980 | 0.10 |
| Peter Wilson | Democratic Opposition Party | 4,899 | 0.10 |
| Peter Munyanduri | New Patriotic Front | 4,533 | 0.09 |
| Ambrose Mutinhiri | National Patriotic Front | 4,107 | 0.09 |
| Daniel Shumba | United Democratic Alliance | 3,907 | 0.08 |
| Peter Gava | United Democratic Front | 2,867 | 0.06 |
| Brian Mteki | Independent | 2,749 | 0.06 |
| Lovemore Madhuku | National Constitutional Assembly | 2,699 | 0.06 |
| Noah Ngoni Manyika | Build Zimbabwe Alliance | 2,683 | 0.06 |
| Elton Mangoma | Coalition of Democrats | 2,436 | 0.05 |
| Melbah Dzapasi | #1980 Freedom Movement Zimbabwe | 1,893 | 0.04 |
| Violet Mariyacha | United Democracy Movement | 1,674 | 0.04 |
| Timothy Chiguvare | People's Progressive Party Zimbabwe | 1,549 | 0.03 |
| Total | | 4,779,822 | 100.00 |
| Valid votes | | 4,779,822 | 98.51 |
| Invalid/blank votes | | 72,406 | 1.49 |
| Total votes | | 4,852,228 | 100.00 |
| Registered voters/turnout | | 5,695,936 | 85.19 |
Source: ZEC

==== By province ====
Results by province
| Province | Joseph Makamba Busha | | Nelson Chamisa | | Everisto Washington Chikanga | | Melbah Dzapasi | | Peter Mapfumo Gava | | Kwanele Hlabangana | | Blessing Kasiyamhuru | | Thokozani Khupe | | Lovemore Madhuku | | Elton Steers Mangoma | | Noah Ngoni Manyika | | Chiguvare Tonderayi Johannes Timothy Mapfumo | | Violet Mariyacha | | Divine Mhambi-Hove | | Emmerson Dambudzo Mnangagwa | | Donald Nkosana Moyo | | Bryn Taurai Mteki | | Willard Tawonezvi Mugadza | | Joice Teurai Ropa Mujuru | | Tenda Peter Munyanduri | | Ambrose Mutinhiri | | Kuzozvirava Doniel Shumba | | Peter Harry Wilson | | Total Votes Rejected | | Ballot Paper Unaccounted for | Total Votes Cast | Total Valid Votes Cast | Voter Population | Voter Turnout % |
| Province | FreeZim Congress | | MDC Alliance | | Rebuild Zimbabwe | | #1980 Freedom Movement Zimbabwe | | United Democratic Front | | Republican Party of Zimbabwe | | Zimbabwe Partnership for Prosperity | | MDC-Tsvangirai | | National Constitutional Assembly | | Coalition of Democrats | | Build Zimbabwe Alliance | | People's Progressive Party Zimbabwe | | United Democracy Movement | | National Alliance of Patriotic and Democratic Republicans | | ZANU-PF | | Alliance for the People's Agenda | | Independent | | Bethel Christian Party | | People's Rainbow Coalition | | New Patriotic Front | | National Patriotic Front | | United Democratic Alliance | | Democratic Opposition Party | | Total Votes Rejected | | Ballot Paper Unaccounted for | Total Votes Cast | Total Valid Votes Cast | Voter Population | Voter Turnout % |
| Province | Votes | % | Votes | % | Votes | % | Votes | % | Votes | % | Votes | % | Votes | % | Votes | % | Votes | % | Votes | % | Votes | % | Votes | % | Votes | % | Votes | % | Votes | % | Votes | % | Votes | % | Votes | % | Votes | % | Votes | % | Votes | % | Votes | % | Votes | % | Votes | % | Ballot Paper Unaccounted for | Total Votes Cast | Total Valid Votes Cast | Voter Population | Voter Turnout % |
|---|---|---|---|---|---|---|---|---|---|---|---|---|---|---|---|---|---|---|---|---|---|---|---|---|---|---|---|---|---|---|---|---|---|---|---|---|---|---|---|---|---|---|---|---|---|---|---|---|---|---|---|---|---|
| Bulawayo | 497 | 0.23 | 144,107 | 66.90 | 364 | 0.17 | 94 | 0.04 | 78 | 0.04 | 442 | 0.21 | 320 | 0.15 | 5,753 | 2.67 | 81 | 0.04 | 60 | 0.03 | 104 | 0.05 | 45 | 0.02 | 65 | 0.03 | 57 | 0.03 | 60,168 | 27.93 | 1,350 | 0.63 | 68 | 0.03 | 231 | 0.11 | 1,050 | 0.49 | 133 | 0.06 | 91 | 0.04 | 118 | 0.05 | 129 | 0.06 | 1,901 | 0.87 | 24 | 217,330 | 215,405 | 258,567 | 84.05 |
| Harare | 1,008 | 0.13 | 548,895 | 71.66 | 831 | 0.11 | 148 | 0.02 | 150 | 0.02 | 347 | 0.05 | 647 | 0.08 | 3,021 | 0.39 | 302 | 0.04 | 211 | 0.03 | 611 | 0.08 | 97 | 0.01 | 88 | 0.01 | 92 | 0.01 | 204,719 | 26.73 | 1,577 | 0.21 | 156 | 0.02 | 574 | 0.07 | 1,689 | 0.22 | 221 | 0.03 | 208 | 0.03 | 221 | 0.03 | 170 | 0.02 | 5,816 | 0.75 | 13 | 771,812 | 765,983 | 900,728 | 85.69 |
| Manicaland | 2,759 | 0.45 | 296,429 | 48.48 | 1,835 | 0.30 | 241 | 0.04 | 391 | 0.06 | 1,223 | 0.20 | 1,027 | 0.17 | 4,793 | 0.78 | 548 | 0.09 | 435 | 0.07 | 237 | 0.04 | 219 | 0.04 | 247 | 0.04 | 627 | 0.10 | 292,938 | 47.91 | 2,508 | 0.41 | 477 | 0.08 | 838 | 0.14 | 1,279 | 0.21 | 594 | 0.10 | 533 | 0.09 | 575 | 0.09 | 659 | 0.11 | 10,221 | 1.64 | 8 | 621,641 | 611,412 | 733,370 | 85.69 |
| Mashonaland Central | 1,480 | 0.31 | 97,097 | 20.36 | 872 | 0.18 | 151 | 0.03 | 232 | 0.05 | 861 | 0.18 | 383 | 0.08 | 1,557 | 0.33 | 150 | 0.03 | 187 | 0.04 | 139 | 0.03 | 120 | 0.03 | 110 | 0.02 | 1,047 | 0.22 | 366,785 | 76.92 | 907 | 0.19 | 247 | 0.05 | 421 | 0.09 | 2,616 | 0.55 | 413 | 0.09 | 373 | 0.08 | 254 | 0.05 | 447 | 0.09 | 6,574 | 1.36 | 47 | 483,470 | 476,849 | 531,984 | 90.88 |
| Mashonaland East | 1,681 | 0.31 | 189,024 | 35.30 | 949 | 0.18 | 194 | 0.04 | 204 | 0.04 | 734 | 0.14 | 590 | 0.11 | 2,296 | 0.43 | 218 | 0.04 | 204 | 0.04 | 186 | 0.03 | 112 | 0.02 | 105 | 0.02 | 302 | 0.06 | 334,617 | 62.49 | 1,166 | 0.22 | 177 | 0.03 | 451 | 0.08 | 972 | 0.18 | 330 | 0.06 | 308 | 0.06 | 274 | 0.05 | 366 | 0.07 | 6,794 | 1.25 | 2 | 542,256 | 535,460 | 633,410 | 85.61 |
| Mashonaland West | 2,233 | 0.41 | 217,732 | 39.78 | 1,435 | 0.26 | 202 | 0.04 | 336 | 0.06 | 1,080 | 0.20 | 915 | 0.17 | 3,000 | 0.55 | 259 | 0.05 | 267 | 0.05 | 263 | 0.05 | 215 | 0.04 | 201 | 0.04 | 581 | 0.11 | 312,958 | 57.18 | 1,540 | 0.28 | 324 | 0.06 | 660 | 0.12 | 1,152 | 0.21 | 544 | 0.10 | 455 | 0.08 | 426 | 0.08 | 572 | 0.10 | 8,652 | 1.56 | 11 | 556,013 | 547,350 | 655,363 | 84.84 |
| Masvingo Province | 2,508 | 0.49 | 171,196 | 33.61 | 2,381 | 0.47 | 217 | 0.04 | 352 | 0.07 | 1,301 | 0.26 | 810 | 0.16 | 3,017 | 0.59 | 335 | 0.07 | 281 | 0.06 | 289 | 0.06 | 218 | 0.04 | 158 | 0.03 | 775 | 0.15 | 319,073 | 62.63 | 1,708 | 0.34 | 411 | 0.08 | 627 | 0.12 | 979 | 0.19 | 798 | 0.16 | 600 | 0.12 | 534 | 0.10 | 857 | 0.17 | 9,941 | 1.91 | 6 | 519,372 | 509,425 | 617,212 | 84.15 |
| Matabeleland North | 1,401 | 0.51 | 137,611 | 50.19 | 1,342 | 0.49 | 221 | 0.08 | 404 | 0.15 | 975 | 0.36 | 765 | 0.28 | 12,776 | 4.66 | 261 | 0.10 | 264 | 0.10 | 227 | 0.08 | 148 | 0.05 | 267 | 0.10 | 462 | 0.17 | 111,452 | 40.65 | 1,419 | 0.52 | 229 | 0.08 | 726 | 0.26 | 1,170 | 0.43 | 412 | 0.15 | 502 | 0.18 | 558 | 0.20 | 570 | 0.21 | 6,767 | 2.41 | 8 | 280,937 | 274,162 | 339,135 | 70.39 |
| Matabeleland South | 1,216 | 0.57 | 90,292 | 42.49 | 1,335 | 0.63 | 170 | 0.08 | 304 | 0.14 | 1,085 | 0.51 | 480 | 0.23 | 4,698 | 2.21 | 249 | 0.12 | 215 | 0.10 | 222 | 0.10 | 158 | 0.07 | 209 | 0.10 | 404 | 0.19 | 107,008 | 50.35 | 1,060 | 0.50 | 255 | 0.12 | 590 | 0.28 | 808 | 0.38 | 429 | 0.20 | 456 | 0.21 | 411 | 0.19 | 461 | 0.22 | 4,080 | 1.88 | 1 | 216,596 | 212,515 | 264,185 | 81.99 |
| Midlands | 2,768 | 0.44 | 257,960 | 40.86 | 1,796 | 0.28 | 255 | 0.04 | 416 | 0.07 | 1,409 | 0.22 | 1,077 | 0.17 | 4,671 | 0.74 | 296 | 0.05 | 312 | 0.05 | 405 | 0.06 | 217 | 0.03 | 224 | 0.04 | 633 | 0.10 | 352,027 | 55.77 | 2,000 | 0.32 | 405 | 0.06 | 776 | 0.12 | 1,170 | 0.19 | 659 | 0.10 | 581 | 0.09 | 536 | 0.08 | 668 | 0.11 | 11,660 | 1.81 | 12 | 642,933 | 631,261 | 761,982 | 84.38 |
| National Total | 17,551 | 0.37 | 2,150,343 | 44.99 | 13,140 | 0.27 | 1,893 | 0.04 | 2,867 | 0.06 | 9,457 | 0.20 | 7,014 | 0.15 | 45,582 | 0.95 | 2,699 | 0.06 | 2,436 | 0.05 | 2,683 | 0.06 | 1,549 | 0.03 | 1,674 | 0.04 | 4,980 | 0.10 | 2,461,745 | 51.50 | 15,235 | 0.32 | 2,749 | 0.06 | 5,894 | 0.12 | 12,885 | 0.27 | 4,533 | 0.09 | 4,107 | 0.09 | 3,907 | 0.08 | 4,899 | 0.10 | 72,406 | 1.49 | 132 | 4,852,360 | 4,779,822 | 5,695,936 | 85.19 |

=== National Assembly ===
| Party | Votes | % | Seats | | | |
| Party | Votes | % | Common | Women | Total | +/– |
|---|---|---|---|---|---|---|
| ZANU–PF | 2,493,522 | 52.36 | 144 | 35 | 179 | –18 |
| Movement for Democratic Change Alliance | 1,648,767 | 34.62 | 64 | 24 | 88 | New |
| Movement for Democratic Change – Tsvangirai | 144,679 | 3.04 | 0 | 1 | 1 | –69 |
| People's Rainbow Coalition | 62,081 | 1.30 | 0 | 0 | 0 | New |
| National Patriotic Front | 53,755 | 1.13 | 1 | 0 | 1 | New |
| Zimbabwe Partnership for Prosperity | 26,982 | 0.57 | 0 | 0 | 0 | New |
| Zimbabwe African People's Union | 16,050 | 0.34 | 0 | 0 | 0 | 0 |
| Zimbabwe Democratic Union | 11,203 | 0.24 | 0 | 0 | 0 | New |
| National Constitutional Assembly | 9,763 | 0.20 | 0 | 0 | 0 | New |
| Build Zimbabwe Alliance | 8,507 | 0.18 | 0 | 0 | 0 | New |
| Mthwakazi Republic Party | 8,263 | 0.17 | 0 | 0 | 0 | New |
| Coalition of Democrats | 6,526 | 0.14 | 0 | 0 | 0 | New |
| FreeZim Congress | 4,096 | 0.09 | 0 | 0 | 0 | 0 |
| United Democratic Alliance | 3,615 | 0.08 | 0 | 0 | 0 | New |
| Republican Party of Zimbabwe | 3,265 | 0.07 | 0 | 0 | 0 | New |
| Alliance for People's Agenda | 2,165 | 0.05 | 0 | 0 | 0 | New |
| #1980 Freedom Movement Zimbabwe | 2,146 | 0.05 | 0 | 0 | 0 | New |
| United Movement for Democracy | 1,997 | 0.04 | 0 | 0 | 0 | 0 |
| United African National Council | 1,892 | 0.04 | 0 | 0 | 0 | New |
| The African Democrats | 1,387 | 0.03 | 0 | 0 | 0 | New |
| The Alliance for National Salvation | 1,204 | 0.03 | 0 | 0 | 0 | New |
| Zimbabwe Revolutionary Democratic Party | 1,170 | 0.02 | 0 | 0 | 0 | New |
| People's Progressive Party Zimbabwe | 1,064 | 0.02 | 0 | 0 | 0 | New |
| Freedom Justice Coalition Zimbabwe | 773 | 0.02 | 0 | 0 | 0 | New |
| United Democratic Front | 611 | 0.01 | 0 | 0 | 0 | New |
| Zimbabwe Labour Party | 464 | 0.01 | 0 | 0 | 0 | New |
| Zimbabwe Patriotic Movement | 402 | 0.01 | 0 | 0 | 0 | New |
| Zimbabwe First Party | 373 | 0.01 | 0 | 0 | 0 | New |
| National Action Party | 362 | 0.01 | 0 | 0 | 0 | New |
| Rebuilding Zimbabwe Party | 346 | 0.01 | 0 | 0 | 0 | New |
| Ma'at Zimbabwe Party | 342 | 0.01 | 0 | 0 | 0 | New |
| Zimbabwe People's Party: Good People's Movement | 328 | 0.01 | 0 | 0 | 0 | New |
| Democratic Opposition Party | 323 | 0.01 | 0 | 0 | 0 | New |
| Forces of the Liberation Organisation of African National Party | 303 | 0.01 | 0 | 0 | 0 | New |
| Chief's Party | 282 | 0.01 | 0 | 0 | 0 | New |
| Unity Party Zimbabwe | 214 | 0.00 | 0 | 0 | 0 | New |
| New Zimbabwe Republican Party | 198 | 0.00 | 0 | 0 | 0 | New |
| Federal Democrats of Zimbabwe | 194 | 0.00 | 0 | 0 | 0 | New |
| Economic Reform Assembly | 176 | 0.00 | 0 | 0 | 0 | New |
| Democratic Alliance - United People's Party | 147 | 0.00 | 0 | 0 | 0 | New |
| Progressive Democrats of Zimbabwe | 144 | 0.00 | 0 | 0 | 0 | New |
| United Christian Alliance | 121 | 0.00 | 0 | 0 | 0 | New |
| United Crusade for Achieving Democracy Green Party of Zimbabwe | 103 | 0.00 | 0 | 0 | 0 | New |
| African People's Congress | 70 | 0.00 | 0 | 0 | 0 | New |
| Suffering Voices of Zimbabwe | 66 | 0.00 | 0 | 0 | 0 | New |
| Freedom Front | 44 | 0.00 | 0 | 0 | 0 | 0 |
| Independents | 242,000 | 5.08 | 1 | 0 | 1 | –1 |
| Total | 4,762,485 | 100.00 | 210 | 60 | 270 | 0 |
| Valid votes | 4,762,485 | 98.35 | | | | |
| Invalid/blank votes | 79,821 | 1.65 | | | | |
| Total votes | 4,842,306 | 100.00 | | | | |
| Registered voters/turnout | 5,706,681 | 84.85 | | | | |
Source: ZEC

=== Senate ===
| Party | Seats | +/– |
|---|---|---|
| ZANU–PF | 35 | –2 |
| Movement for Democratic Change Alliance | 24 | New |
| MDC–Tsvangirai | 1 | –20 |
| Chiefs | 18 | 0 |
| Persons with disabilities | 2 | 0 |
| Total | 80 | 0 |
Source: Zimbabwe Electoral Commission

== Aftermath ==
Within days after the election, there were protests by the Movement for Democratic Change opposition. The army opened fire on demonstrators and bystanders killing six people. In the following days, many opposition supporters were arrested, according to opposition leaders and human rights groups.

The parliamentary results were marked by miscalculations, errors in spreadsheet tabulation, as well as a legal dispute between results announced and votes counted. The most notable dispute was that of the constituency of Chegutu West, where 121 votes from one ward were misallocated, leaving the MDC-A candidate, Gift Konjana with 10,828 votes to ZANU-PF candidate Dexter Nduna's 10,932. When the error was noticed, ZEC claimed that they had already announced ZANU-PF as the winner, and the result could only be reversed with an order of an Electoral Court. The matter ended up in court as Gift Machoka Konjana v Dexter Nduna, though ultimately ZANU-PF's Nduna took the seat in Parliament, in spite of losing the election to Konjana.

On 10 August, it was announced that Mnangagwa's inauguration, which had been scheduled for 12 August, would be delayed after Chamisa petitioned to challenge the election results in court, with a ruling due by the end of the month. On 24 August 2018, the Supreme Court of Zimbabwe dismissed Chamisa's challenge and officially declared Mnangagwa the winner in a unanimous ruling. The Chief Justice Luke Malaba noted that Chamisa refused both a recount and access to the ballot boxes. Mnangagwa's inauguration and official swearing-in was then held on 26 August.

Two Washington-based entities, American International Republican Institute (IRI) and National Democratic Institute (NDI), which were involved in the Zimbabwe International Election Observation Mission (ZIEOM) expressed doubts that the poll had a standard accepting value. Manisha Singh, the U.S. Assistant Secretary of State for Economic and Business Affairs, told a congressional hearing that until the new government of President Emmerson Mnangagwa shows signs of "changing its ways," the U.S. government will not lift sanctions against Zimbabwe.

== See also ==
- 9th Parliament of Zimbabwe
- List of members of the 9th Parliament of Zimbabwe
