= Morgan Tsvangirai =

Prime Minister of Zimbabwe, 2000 to 2013

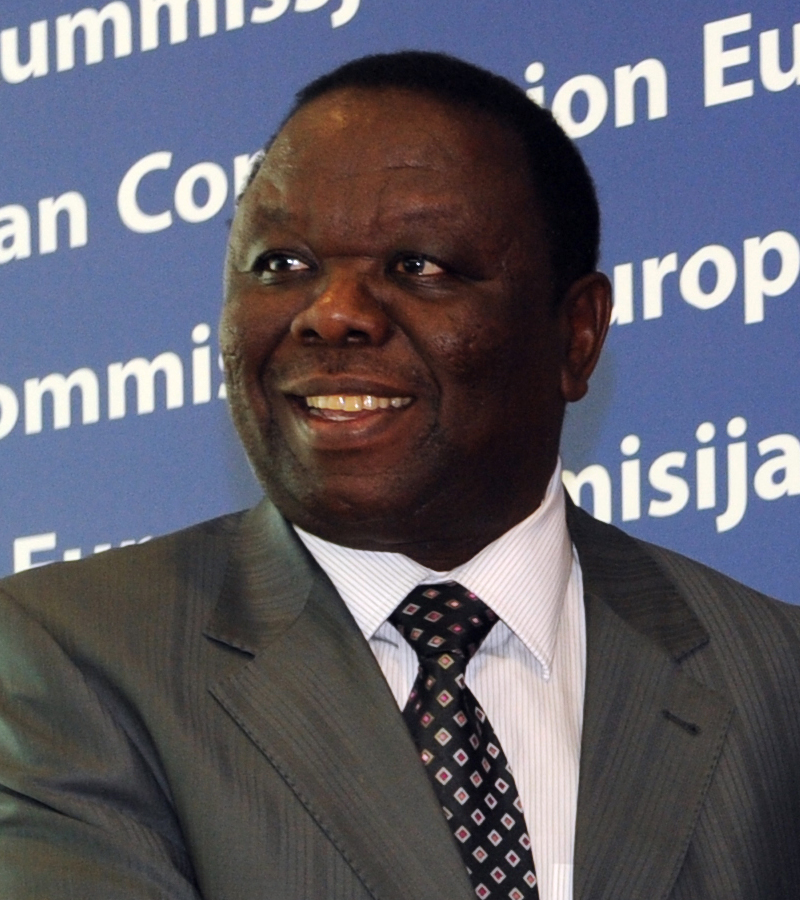
- Tsvangirai in 2009

2nd Prime Minister of Zimbabwe
- In office 11 February 2009 – 22 August 2013
- President: Robert Mugabe
- Deputy: Thokozani Khuphe; Arthur Mutambara
- Preceded by: Robert Mugabe (1987)
- Succeeded by: Office abolished

President of the Movement for Democratic Change – Tsvangirai Movement for Democratic Change (1999–2005)
- In office 30 September 1999 – 14 February 2018
- Preceded by: Gibson Sibanda
- Succeeded by: Nelson Chamisa

Leader of the Opposition
- In office 30 September 1999 – 14 February 2018
- President: Robert Mugabe; Emmerson Mnangagwa
- Preceded by: Abel Muzorewa
- Succeeded by: Nelson Chamisa

General Secretary of the Zimbabwe Congress of Trade Unions
- In office 10 May 1987 – 30 September 1999
- Preceded by: Masotsha Ndhlovu
- Succeeded by: Wellington Chibebe

Personal details
- Born: Morgan Richard Tsvangirai; 10 March 1952 Gutu, Southern Rhodesia
- Died: 14 February 2018 (aged 65) Johannesburg, South Africa
- Cause of death: Colorectal cancer
- Party: Zimbabwe African National Union (before 1987); Zimbabwe African National Union – Patriotic Front (1987–1999); Movement for Democratic Change (1999–2005); Movement for Democratic Change – Tsvangirai (2005–2018)
- Spouses: Susan Mhundwa (m. 1978; died 2009) Elizabeth Macheka (m. 2011)
- Children: 9 (including Richard)
- Website: Government website Party website

Morgan Richard Tsvangirai (/ˈtʃæŋɡɪraɪ/; Shona pronunciation: [t͡sᶲa.ᵑɡi.ra.i]; 10 March 1952 – 14 February 2018) was a Zimbabwean politician who was Prime Minister of Zimbabwe from 2009 to 2013. He was president of the Movement for Democratic Change, and later the Movement for Democratic Change – Tsvangirai (MDC–T), and a key figure in the opposition to then-president Robert Mugabe.

Tsvangirai was the MDC candidate in the controversial 2002 Zimbabwean presidential election, losing to Mugabe. He later contested the first round of the 2008 Zimbabwean presidential election as the MDC-T candidate, taking 47.8% of the vote according to official results, placing him ahead of Mugabe, who received 43.2%. Tsvangirai claimed to have won a majority and said that the results could have been altered in the month between the election and the reporting of official results. Tsvangirai initially planned to run in the second round against Mugabe, but withdrew shortly before it was held, arguing that the election would not be free and fair due to widespread violence and intimidation by government supporters that led to the deaths of 200 people.

Tsvangirai sustained non-life-threatening injuries in a car crash on 6 March 2009 when heading towards his rural home in Buhera. His first wife, Susan Tsvangirai, was killed in the head-on collision. As the 2017 Zimbabwean coup d'état occurred, Tsvangirai asked Mugabe to step down. He hoped that an all-inclusive stakeholders' meeting to chart the country's future and an internationally supervised process for the forthcoming elections would create a process that would take the country towards a legitimate regime. On 14 February 2018, Tsvangirai died at the age of 65 after reportedly suffering from colorectal cancer.

== Early life and family ==
Tsvangirai was born in the Buhera area, in then Southern Rhodesia, to Karanga Shona parentage through his father Dzingirai-Chibwe Tsvangirai and mother Lydia Tsvangirai (née Zvaipa). He was the eldest of nine children, and the son of a communal farmer, mine worker, carpenter and bricklayer. He completed his primary education at St. Marks Goneso Primary School Hwedza, and was transferred by his father to Chikara Primary School Gutu, then to Silveira. He completed his secondary education at Gokomere High School. After leaving school with 8 Ordinary levels, in April 1972 he landed his first job as a trainee weaver for Elastics & Tapes textile factory in Mutare. In 1974 an old school mate from Silveira encouraged Morgan to apply for an advertised job as an apprentice for Anglo America's Bindura's Nickel Mine in Mashonaland Central. He spent ten years at the mine, rising from plant operator to plant supervisor. His rural home was Buhera, which is 220 km south east of Harare.

Tsvangirai married his first wife, Susan, in 1978. The couple had six children during their 31-year marriage, which ended with her death in the 2009 car crash. In 2011 Locardia Karimatsenga (born 1970) claimed that Tsvangirai married her in a customary ceremony in 2010. She had been seeking maintenance payments of £10,000 a month to keep up the lifestyle to which, she said in court papers, she had become accustomed. A year later, his love life made headlines again after a 23-year-old woman bore him a child and he refused to support the baby until she threatened to take him to court. He married his second wife, Elizabeth Macheka (born 1976) mother of three, on 15 September 2012. His son Richard Tsvangirai was elected MP for Norton constituency in the 2023 Zimbabwean general election.

== Political activism ==
Upon Zimbabwean independence in 1980, Tsvangirai, who was then aged 28, joined the ascendent ZANU–PF party, led by Robert Mugabe, who would later become his biggest political rival. Tsvangirai is reported to have been an ardent Mugabe supporter and to have risen "swiftly in the hierarchy", eventually becoming one of the party's senior officials. He is also known for his role in the Zimbabwean trade union movement, where he held the position of branch chairman of the Associated Mine.

Workers' Union and was later elected into the executive of the National Mine Workers' Union. In 1989 he became the Secretary-General of the Zimbabwe Congress of Trade Unions, the umbrella trade union organisation of Zimbabwe.

Tsvangirai led the ZCTU away from the ruling ZANU-PF. As his power and that of the movement grew, his relationship with the government deteriorated.

=== Criticism of Gukurahundi ===
Three years after coming to power, Robert Mugabe ordered the 5th Brigade, a military unit specially trained by North Korea, to commit a massacre in Matabeleland in co-operation with the Minister of Defence Enos Nkala, led by Air Marshal Perrance Shiri because of suspicion of an alleged counter-revolution being planned by Joshua Nkomo. Tsvangirai would later use Gukurahundi against ZANU and to drum up support in Matabeleland. Tsvangirai has periodically toured the mass graves of the victims in Tsholotsho, Kezi, Lupane, Nkayi and other places in rural Matabeleland. Addressing villagers in Maphisa in 2001, he said:

This was a barbaric operation by ZANU-PF. It should never have happened. It was a sad episode in our history and the MDC will obviously want to see justice being done if it comes to power. Such human rights abuses should be revisited and those responsible will have to account for their actions.

=== National Constitutional Assembly ===
The National Constitutional Assembly (NCA), established in 1997, was chaired by a Moderator, and its day-to-day executive was run by a Task Force. Tsvangirai chaired the Task Force, as founding convener Tawanda Mutasah (succeeded by Bishop Nemapare) served as Moderator. Serving with Tsvangirai in the Task Force were activists that included Lovemore Madhuku, Welshman Ncube, Everjoice Win, Brian Kagoro, Tendai Biti and Priscilla Misihairabwi. The NCA gathered individual Zimbabwean citizens and civic organisations including labour movements, student and youth groups, women's groups, churches, business groups and human rights organisations. These individuals and groups formed the NCA to campaign for constitutional reform after realising that the political, social and economic problems affecting Zimbabwe were mainly a result of the defective Lancaster House constitution and could only be resolved through a new and democratic constitution. Tsvangirai stepped down after being elected president of the MDC.

=== Solidar Silver Rose Award ===
In 2001 Tsvangirai was awarded the Solidar Silver Rose Award. The award was for outstanding achievement by an individual or organisation in the activities of civil society and in bringing about a fairer and more just society.

== Movement for Democratic Change ==
In 1999 Tsvangirai co-founded and organised the Movement for Democratic Change with Gibson Sibanda, Welshman Ncube, Fletcher Dulini Ncube and Isaac Matongo, an opposition party opposed to President Robert Mugabe and the ZANU-PF ruling party. He helped to defeat the February 2000 constitutional referendum, successfully campaigning against it along with the National Constitutional Assembly.

Tsvangirai lost the March 2002 presidential election to Mugabe. The election was flawed due to rigged voting, the use of violence, media bias, and manipulation of the voters' roll leading to abnormally high pro-Mugabe turnout in some areas.

== Arrests and political intimidation ==
Tsvangirai was arrested after the 2000 elections and charged with treason; this charge was later dismissed. The state's star witness was Ari-Ben Manashe. In 2004, Tsvangirai was acquitted of treason for an alleged plot to assassinate Mugabe in the run-up to the 2002 presidential elections. George Bizos, a South African human rights lawyer who was part of the team that defended Nelson Mandela and Walter Sisulu in the famous South African Rivonia Trial in 1964, headed Morgan Tsvangirai's defence team.

=== October 2000 arrest ===
Tsvangirai was arrested after the government alleged that he had threatened President Robert Mugabe. The Movement for Democratic Change leader had told 40,000 supporters at a rally in Harare that if Mr Mugabe did not want to step down before the next elections scheduled for 2002 "we will remove you violently." Tsvangirai said that he was giving a warning to President Mugabe to consider history. He said: "There is a long line of dictators who have refused to go peacefully – and the people have removed them violently."

The courts dismissed the charges.

=== June 2003 arrest ===
In May 2003, Tsvangirai was arrested on a Friday afternoon shortly after giving a press conference, the government alleged he had incited violence. In the press conference he had said:

From Monday, 2 June, up to today, 6 June, Mugabe was not in charge of this country. He was busy marshaling his forces of repression against the sovereign will of the people of Zimbabwe. However, even in the context of the brutalities inflicted upon them, the people's spirit of resistance was not broken. The sound of gunfire will never silence their demand for change and freedom.

=== March 2007 arrest and beating ===
On 11 March 2007 a day after his 55th birthday, Tsvangirai was arrested on his way to a prayer rally in the Harare township of Highfield. His wife was allowed to see him in prison, after which she reported that he had been heavily tortured by police, resulting in deep gashes on his head and a badly swollen eye. The event garnered an international outcry. He was allegedly tortured by a Special Forces of Zimbabwe unit based at the army's Cranborne Barracks on 12 March 2007 after being arrested and held at Machipisa Police Station in the Highfield suburb of Harare.

Using sjamboks, army belts and gun butts, the soldiers attacked Tsvangirai until he passed out. One of the soldiers poured cold water all over Tsvangirai to resuscitate him. Tsvangirai regained consciousness again at around 1:30 am... One vicious woman was left to work on him. She removed an army belt from her waist and used it to assault Tsvangirai until he passed out again.

— Police Officer, Mail and Guardian

Innocent Chagonda, an attorney, told Reuters after visiting a Harare police station where Tsvangirai was being held, that "[Tsvangirai] was in bad shape, he was swollen very badly. He was bandaged on the head. You couldn't distinguish between the head and the face and he could not see properly."

A Zimbabwean freelance cameraman, Edward Chikombo, smuggled television pictures of Morgan Tsvangirai's injuries following the beating. Chikombo was later abducted from his home in the Glenview township outside Harare. His body was discovered the next weekend near the village of Darwendale, 50 miles (80 km) west of Harare. There has been a pattern of abductions and punishment beatings where scores of opposition activists and their relatives have been attacked by government-sanctioned gangs using unmarked cars and police-issue weapons.

According to lawyer Tendai Biti, the Secretary-General of the MDC and an MP for Harare East, who was arrested along with Tsvangirai, Tsvangirai suffered a cracked skull and "must have passed out at least three times." Tsvangirai was subsequently admitted to the intensive care unit (ICU) at a local hospital. Reports from BBC News indicate that Tsvangirai suffered from a fractured skull and received blood transfusions for internal bleeding. Although the incident was a clear case of political violence, Tsvangirai has since had very little political support from surrounding African countries.

=== Raid at MDC headquarters ===
Tsvangirai was released, but on 28 March 2007, Zimbabwean police stormed the Movement for Democratic Change, 44 Harvest House, national headquarters and once again arrested him, hours before he was to speak with the media about recent political violence in the country.

=== International reaction to political violence ===
The arrest of Tsvangirai and a crackdown on opposition officials that followed was widely condemned.

Australia—former Foreign Minister Alexander Downer said in a statement that the Zimbabwe government should immediately release those arrested, lift the ban on political activity and implement immediate reforms. He said that the arrests "are clear signs of the Mugabe Government's desperation to cling to power in the face of its growing unpopularity amongst the people of Zimbabwe. The Mugabe Government's disastrous policies have crippled a once thriving economy, leaving Zimbabweans enduring hyper-inflation at over 1,600%, over 80% of the population unemployed and living below the poverty line and with the lowest life expectancy of any country in the world."

Canada—On 12 March 2007, Foreign Minister Peter MacKay issued a statement condemning the violence in Zimbabwe and simultaneously calling for the release of all arrested.

Ireland—In a statement, Foreign Minister Dermot Ahern condemned the actions of the Zimbabwean authorities and called on that country's government to immediately cease all such activities and to adopt a new policy of dialogue and engagement with the outside world.

Mauritius—The government of Mauritius issued a communiqué on 19 March 2007, in which it stated that it viewed "with concern the arrest, detention and assault of the opposition leaders", and went on to urge that the government of Zimbabwe "ensure that the basic rights and fundamental freedoms of all Zimbabweans are observed.

New Zealand—Foreign Minister Winston Peters called for the immediate release of Tsvangirai and his colleagues.

United Kingdom—Former British Prime Minister Tony Blair's commented of the events of 11 March 2007: "People should be able to live under the rule of law. They should be able to express their political views without harassment or intimidation or violence. And what is happening in Zimbabwe is truly tragic."

South Africa—South African Deputy Foreign Minister Aziz Pahad stated that South Africa is concerned about the crackdown and asked the Zimbabwean government "to ensure that the rule of law including respect for rights of all Zimbabweans and leaders of various political parties is respected".

Sweden—Swedish Foreign Minister Carl Bildt said in his official blog: "It's totally obvious that the brutal acts of cruelty against freedom of assembly and freedom of speech committed by the Zimbabwean government during the peaceful meeting of prayers on 11 March must be firmly condemned."

United States—The United States considered further sanctions against the leadership of Zimbabwe following the event.

=== Tsvangirai's bodyguard killed ===
On 25 October 2007, it was reported that Nhamo Musekiwa, who was Morgan Tsvangirai's bodyguard since the formation of the MDC in 1999, had died from complications resulting from injuries sustained in March 2007, during a crackdown by the government. The MDC spokesman Nelson Chamisa said Musekiwa had been vomiting blood since 11 March 2007, when he is alleged to have been severely beaten, along with other opposition officials and members, including Tsvangirai himself, by the police. That day police halted a prayer meeting; in the ensuing confrontation, one MDC activist, Gift Tandare, was shot dead. The shooting of Tandare was documented by prominent Zimbabwean journalist Tapiwa Zivira who was then a student with the local paper, The Zimbabwe Standard.

=== Assassination plot delays homecoming ===
Tsvangirai was due to arrive in Harare, Zimbabwe, on Saturday, 17 May 2008, but a party spokesman said he was staying in Europe after a credible assassination plot was discovered. On Friday, 16 May 2008, he held a press conference at the Europa Hotel in Belfast, Northern Ireland.

=== June 2008 arrest ===
Morgan Tsvangirai was detained by police while campaigning on Wednesday, 4 June 2008, after being stopped at a police roadblock. Tsvangirai and a group of 14 party officials were held at a police station in Lupane. This was claimed by Tsvangirai, and widely believed by human rights groups, to be a tactic to disrupt his campaign for 27 June elections. Tsvangirai was accused by police of threatening public security by addressing a gathering without prior authorisation. His detention was vigorously protested by the United States and various European governments. He was released without charge after eight hours. Tsvangirai commented that this was "nothing but the usual harassment which is totally unnecessary." The police also confiscated one of the security vehicles in the entourage. During this time, Mugabe was in Rome at a conference on food security. However, chief police spokesperson of Zimbabwe Wayne Bvudzijena said Tsvangirai's convoy was stopped because one of the vehicles did not have proper registration. The driver of the vehicle was asked to accompany the police to the station, but others in the party insisted on following the driver to the station. This was followed by the brief detention of diplomats from the United States and United Kingdom.

On 6 June 2008 he was again stopped at a police checkpoint and blocked from attending a pre-election rally at How Mine, near the southern city of Bulawayo. According to the chairman of the Movement for Democratic Change, Lovemore Moyo, the police said they should have informed them in advance of Tsvangirai visiting the area. On 22 June 2008 Tsvangirai announced that he had withdrawn from the presidential election run-off in the face of violence from ruling party militias. Later that day, he took refuge in the embassy of the Netherlands in Harare, because he feared for his safety. He did not request asylum. He stayed on the Dutch compound until 30 June.

== Allegations of wrongdoing ==
=== Allegations of coup plot ===
In 2002, Ari Ben-Menashe accused Tsavangirai of plotting to overthrow the Zimbabwean government in a coup d'état. After a treason trial, Tsvangirai was acquitted of the charges.

=== 2011 investigations over WikiLeaks disclosures ===
The Attorney General set up a team of lawyers to investigate whether Tsvangirai may be charged with conspiracy or treason after the United States diplomatic cables leak was published.

=== Party brutality ===
Tsvangirai has been accused of allowing activists to attack opponents within his own party. In 2005, such allegations triggered the split in his party between his faction and the faction now led by Arthur Mutambara. In February 2014, a senior party member claimed he was beaten and injured after calling for Tsvangirai to step down as party leader. Tsvangirai had said his party would investigate the allegation. An unnamed witness backed Elton Mangoma's allegation and added: "It is shocking that this actually took place... right in Tsvangirai's face and with him smiling."

== International discussions ==
=== Meeting with John Howard ===
In August 2007, Tsvangirai met Australian Prime Minister John Howard in Melbourne, and after talks told the media that countries like Australia could play a very important role in the struggle against President Robert Mugabe's regime.

=== Tsvangirai meets Mbeki over Zimbabwe crisis ===
In September 2007, it was widely reported that Tsvangirai met Thabo Mbeki, the former President of South Africa for crucial talks on how to speed up talks between the ruling ZANU PF and the Movement for Democratic Change party.

=== Tsvangirai meets Odinga over Zimbabwe crisis ===
In May 2008, Tsvangirai met Raila Odinga, the then Prime Minister of Kenya, who urged him to contest an election run-off against Mugabe.

== 2008 election ==
A presidential election and parliamentary election was held on 29 March 2008. The three major candidates were Mugabe, Tsvangirai and Simba Makoni, an independent. The MDC photographed data at each polling station to collate for electoral results. The official results of the presidential election's first round were finally released on 2 May 2008 and hotly contested by the MDC representatives. According to the results released by the Zimbabwe Electoral Commission, Tsvangirai won the first round, amassing 47.9% of the votes against 43.2% claimed by Mugabe. This meant that no candidate had the necessary 50% plus one vote to be declared the winner after the first round and a run-off would be needed. MDC spokesperson Nelson Chamisa called the announced results "scandalous daylight robbery." The MDC continued to assert that it won an outright victory in the first round with 50.3% of the votes.

Tsvangirai, who was outside of Zimbabwe, primarily in South Africa, for a significant period following the first round of the election, announced on 10 May that he would participate in a presidential run-off with Mugabe. Tsvangirai said that this second round should take place within the three-week period following the announcement of results that is specified by the Electoral Act. He made his participation conditional on "unfettered access of all international observers," the "reconstitution" of the Electoral Commission, and free access for the media, including the international press. On 13 May 2008, Tsvangirai stated that he would be willing to compete in the run-off if at least Southern African Development Community election observers would be present, softening his previous demand for free access to all international observers. It was subsequently announced that the second round would be held on 27 June; the MDC denounced this delay.

Although Tsvangirai had been expected to return to Zimbabwe on 17 May, the MDC announced his return was delayed due to a claimed plot to assassinate him. The party claimed that military intelligence was in charge of the alleged plot, while the government dismissed the MDC's claims, saying that Tsvangirai was "playing to the international media gallery." Some observers suggested at this time that Tsvangirai's failure to return called into his question his leadership qualities and made it appear that he was afraid of Mugabe and unwilling to risk coming to harm despite the risks taken by his supporters remaining in Zimbabwe.

Tsvangirai returned to Zimbabwe from South Africa on 24 May. He gave what he described as a state of the nation address to the newly elected MDC MPs on 30 May. On this occasion, he said that Zimbabwe was in "a state of despair" and was "an unmitigated embarrassment to the African continent" due to its economic situation, and he also said that those engaging in political violence would receive no amnesty from his government. He also described the MDC as "the new ruling party" and said that the MDC's legislative programme would be "based on the return of fundamental freedoms to the people of Zimbabwe." A new "people-driven constitution" would follow within 18 months, according to Tsvangirai, and a "truth and justice commission" would be established; the army would "defend our borders, not attack our people," while the prisons would "hold only criminals, not innocent people". He pledged that the party would introduce a new strategy combining "demand and supply-side measures" to bring inflation under control. Tsvangirai also promised the revival of agriculture, saying that the issue would be "completely depoliticised" and that there would be measures to "compensate or reintegrate" farmers who lost their land as part of land reform. The government has said that a victory for Tsvangirai would be disastrous and "destabilising".

Tsvangirai was detained near Lupane on 4 June, along with his security team and other top MDC officials, such as MDC Vice-President Thokozani Khupe and MDC chairman Lovemore Moyo. A lawyer for the MDC said that Tsvangirai was alleged to have addressed a rally near Lupane without permission. His vehicle was stopped by police at a roadblock and his motorcade was searched; after two hours, he was taken to a police station. The MDC described this as "part of a determined and well-orchestrated effort to derail our campaign programme", while the US government called the incident "deeply disturbing" and the German government demanded his release. Tsvangirai was released later that day after nine hours. Bvudzijena, the police spokesman, rejected any suggestion that the police were trying to interfere in Tsvangirai's campaign; he explained the detention by saying that the police had wanted to determine whether a vehicle in Tsvangirai's motorcade had valid registration. According to Bvudzijena, the police had wanted to take only the driver of this vehicle to the police station to review the relevant documents, but that Tsvangirai and the rest of his entourage insisted on coming as well.

On 22 June 2008, Tsvangirai announced at a press conference that he was withdrawing from the run-off, describing it as a "violent sham" and saying that his supporters risked being killed if they voted for him. He vowed that the MDC would ultimately prevail and that its victory could "only be delayed". Shortly after making this announcement, Mr Tsvangirai sought refuge at the Dutch Embassy in Harare, citing concerns for his safety. He did not seek political asylum.

== Political negotiations ==
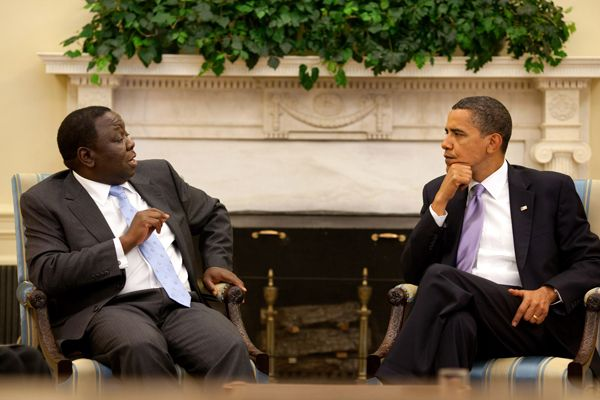
Tsvangirai meeting Barack Obama in the White House in June 2009

On 22 July 2008, Tsvangirai and Mutambara met Mugabe face-to-face and shook hands with him for the first time in over a decade for negotiations in Harare, orchestrated by Mbeki, aiming for a settlement of electoral disputes that would share power between the MDC and the ZANU-PF at the executive level. This was followed by the beginning of clandestine negotiations between appointed emissaries from both parties in Pretoria. The media images of hands being shaken between the political rivals also set a stark contrast to the ongoing partisan violence taking place in both the rural and urban areas of Zimbabwe.

At the end of the fourth day of negotiations, South African President and mediator to Zimbabwe, Thabo Mbeki, announced in Harare that Mugabe of Zanu-PF, Arthur Mutambara of MDC and Tsvangirai finally signed the power-sharing agreement – a "memorandum of understanding". Mbeki stated:

An agreement has been reached on all items on the agenda ... [Mugabe, Tsvangirai, Mutambara] endorsed the document tonight, and signed it. The formal signing will be done on Monday 10 am. The document will be released then. The ceremony will be attended by SADC and other African regional and continental leaders. The leaders will spend the next few days constituting the inclusive government to be announced on Monday. The leaders will work very hard to mobilise support for the people to recover. We hope the world will assist so that this political agreement succeeds.

In the signed historic power deal, Mugabe, on 11 September 2008 agreed to surrender day-to-day control of the government and the deal is also expected to result in a de facto amnesty for the military and ZANU-PF party leaders. Opposition sources said "Tsvangirai will become prime minister at the head of a council of ministers, the principal organ of government, drawn from his Movement for Democratic Change and the president's Zanu-PF party; and Mugabe will remain president and continue to chair a cabinet that will be a largely consultative body, and the real power will lie with Tsvangirai. South Africa's Business Day reported, however, that Mugabe was refusing to sign a deal which would curtail his presidential powers. The New York Times said Nelson Chamisa, a spokesman for the opposition Movement for Democratic Change, announced: "This is an inclusive government. The executive power would be shared by the president, the prime minister and the cabinet. Mugabe, Tsvangirai and Mutambara have still not decided how to divide the ministries. But Jendayi E. Frazer, the American Assistant Secretary of State for African Affairs, said: "We don't know what's on the table, and it's hard to rally for an agreement when no one knows the details or even the broad outlines."

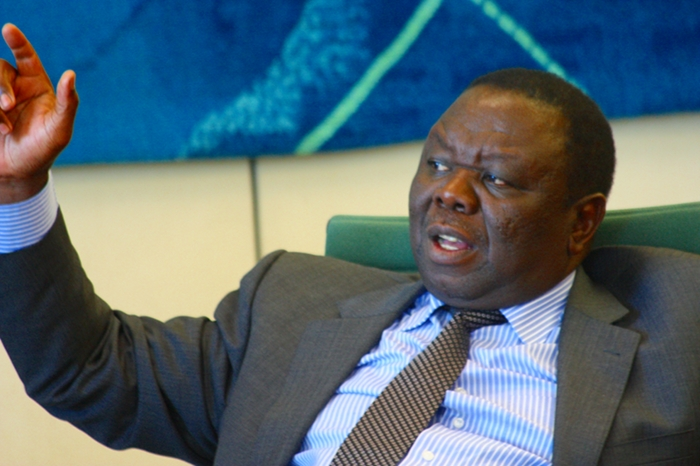
Tsvangirai in 2009

On 15 September 2008, the leaders of the 14-member Southern African Development Community witnessed the signing of the power-sharing agreement, brokered by South African leader Thabo Mbeki. With symbolic handshake and warm smiles at the Rainbow Towers hotel, in Harare, Mugabe and Tsvangirai signed the deal to end the violent political crisis. As provided, Mugabe remained president, Tsvangirai became prime minister, the MDC took control of the police, Mugabe's ZANU-PF retained command of the Army, and Mutambara became deputy prime minister.

In January 2009, Tsvangirai announced that he would do as the leaders across Africa had insisted and join a coalition government as prime minister with Mugabe. On 11 February 2009 Tsvangirai was sworn in as the Prime Minister of Zimbabwe.

== Unity government ==
Following the swearing-in of the unity government, Tsvangirai's announced nominee for deputy agriculture minister, Roy Bennett, was arrested and charged with treason, which was later reduced to a charge of possessing weapons for the destabilisation of the government; Tsvangirai's government exhibited little ability to rescind the charges. Furthermore, farmland invasions by the war veterans continued, with Mugabe maintaining the land reform policy despite the protests of the opposition.

Tsvangirai reportedly visited Nigerian pastor T.B. Joshua in September 2010 to seek Divine intervention for the upcoming Zimbabwean elections.

Speaking to This Is Africa in early 2012, Tsvangirai described how he believed the original agreement was not being honoured, stating "Mugabe has appointed governors, when in the power-sharing agreement all appointments should be in consultation with me. He has appointed ambassadorial deployments without consulting me. He extended the appointment of some of the key security positions like Commissioner of Police beyond their term of office without consulting me. The litany of unilateral decisions is obvious."

The unity government came to an end with the 2013 Zimbabwean general election in which Mugabe was re-elected as president. The office of Prime Minister was abolished by the 2013 Constitution.

== Death ==
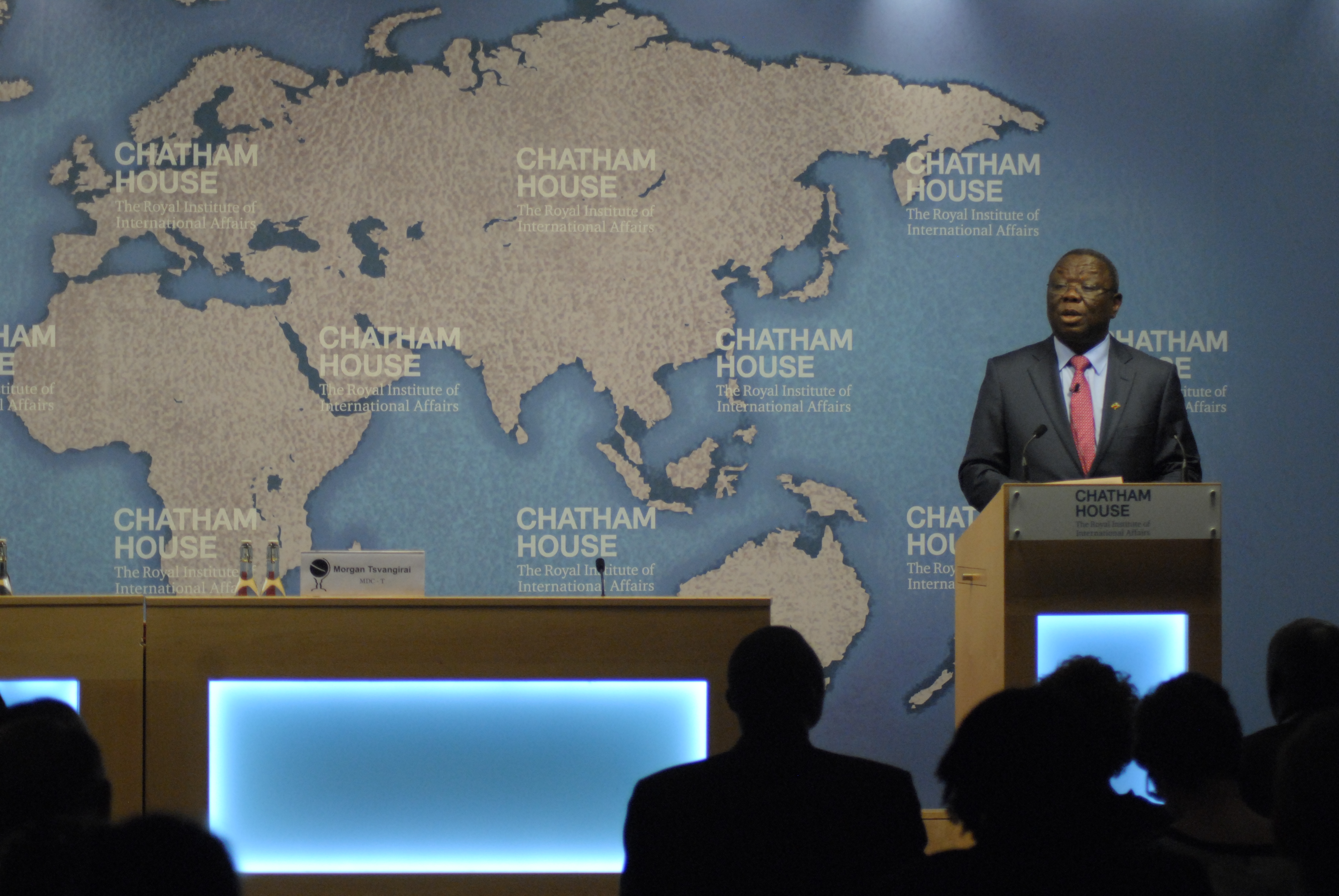
Tsvangirai speaking at Chatham House in London in 2014

In June 2016, Tsvangirai had announced that he had been diagnosed with cancer and was undergoing treatment. Over the following years the condition of his health declined and on 6 February 2018, it was announced that he was critically ill and in a hospital in South Africa. An MDC spokesperson stated: "We should brace for the worst". referring to the seriousness of his condition. He died eight days later on 14 February. His death was announced by Elias Mudzuri, a senior official within the party, who stated: "He died this evening. The family communicated this to me." Tsvangirai's death was considered a serious blow to the MDC in the run-up to the elections planned for mid-2018, the first since the end of Robert Mugabe's rule.

The cause of death was presumed to be colorectal cancer. In the aftermath of Tsvangirai's death, his mother threatened to commit suicide if Nelson Chamisa, his successor, attended the funeral. The events were commonly seen as testament to the strained atmosphere shrouding the party in the days leading up to Tsvangirai's death with the leaders closest to him jockeying to succeed him.

== Honours ==
During a visit to South Korea in May 2010, Tsvangirai was conferred with an honorary degree of Doctor of Laws by Pai Chai University, becoming the 13th recipient of an honorary degree in the 125-year history of this United Methodist Church institution.

On 22 August 2012, Tsvangirai was awarded the insignia of Commander of the Legion of Honour at the French Embassy in Harare.

== See also ==
- History of Zimbabwe
- Years in Zimbabwe
- Premiership of Morgan Tsvangirai

Party political offices
New political party	Leader of the Movement for Democratic Change; 1999–2005	MDC party split
New political party	Leader of the Movement for Democratic Change-Tsvangirai; 2005–2018	Incumbent
Political offices
Vacant Title last held by Robert Mugabe	Prime Minister of Zimbabwe; 2009–2013	Position abolished
