= Movement for Democratic Change – Tsvangirai =

Political party in Zimbabwe

- Leader: Douglas Mwonzora
- Founder: Morgan Tsvangirai
- Founded: 2005
- Split from: Movement for Democratic Change
- Headquarters: Morgan Tsvangirai House, 44 Nelson Mandela Ave., Harare, Zimbabwe
- Youth wing: MDC Youth Assembly
- Ideology: Social democracy Left-wing nationalism
- Political position: Centre-left
- National affiliation: MDC Alliance (2018–2020)
- International affiliation: Socialist International; Progressive Alliance
- Colours: Red and black
- National Assembly: 0 / 280

Party flag

Website
- www.mdc.co.zw

The Movement for Democratic Change – Tsvangirai (MDC–T) was a centre-left political party and was the main opposition party in the House of Assembly of Zimbabwe ahead of the 2018 elections. After the split of the original Movement for Democratic Change in 2005, the MDC–T remained the major opposition faction, while a smaller faction, the Movement for Democratic Change – Ncube, or MDC–N, was led by Welshman Ncube.

== History ==
=== Foundation ===
The Movement for Democratic Change was founded in 1999 as an opposition party to the Zimbabwe African National Union – Patriotic Front (ZANU-PF) party led by President Robert Mugabe. The MDC was formed from members of the broad coalition of civic society groups and individuals that campaigned for a "No" vote in the 2000 constitutional referendum, in particular the Zimbabwe Congress of Trade Unions.
The party split following the 2005 Senate election, with the main faction headed by the founder leader Morgan Tsvangirai and the other formation headed by Arthur Mutambara. At the Morgan Tsvangirai-led 2006 Congress, Thokozani Khuphe was elected as vice-president, replacing Gibson Sibanda who was now part of MDC-M.

The two factions subsequently won a combined majority in the March 2008 parliamentary election.

=== Developments in 2007 ===
On 3 August 2007 it was widely reported that two officials of the smaller Arthur Mutambara-led MDC formation had defected to the main Tsvangirai-led Movement for Democratic Change Zimbabwe formation, a week after talks to reunite the two parties had broken down. At a media briefing, former Member of Parliament Silas Mangono and Masvingo Province chairman Shaky Matake announced that they had defected from the Mutambara-led formation.

An opinion poll on 27 September 2007 by the Mass Public Opinion Institute of Zimbabwe found that of the 22% of poll respondents who are supporters of the MDC, 21% backed the main MDC formation led Tsvangirai and 1% expressed support for the smaller Mutambara's faction.

The poll takers acknowledged the survey was conducted mainly in the rural areas, traditionally a ZANU–PF stronghold, because the majority of the population lives there. It polled 1,202 of eligible voters.

=== Political negotiations ===
The Southern African Development Community (SADC) mandated South African President Thabo Mbeki to mediate between ZANU-PF and the MDC in April 2007 to create conditions for free and fair elections for the 2008 polls. Mbeki appointed Sydney Mufamadi, South Africa's Minister of Provincial and Local Government, and director-general in the presidency, Frank Chikane, as the main mediators in the talks. All parties agreed to refrain from commenting on the progress of the talks in the media. Due to the media silence, it is relatively difficult to judge the progress of these talks, but both parties have agreed to constitutional amendments and the revision of certain key media and security laws. The MDC faction led by Morgan Tsvangirai threatened to pull out of the talks if the conditions were not created in which free and fair elections can take place.

In July and August 2008, the MDC and ZANU–PF entered into negotiations to settle electoral disputes and to reach a compromise. The talks were both mediated by the South African president, Thabo Mbeki.

=== SADC Facilitated Government Power-Sharing Agreement ===
On 15 September 2008, the leaders of the 14-member Southern African Development Community witnessed the signing of the power-sharing agreement, brokered by Mbeki. At the Rainbow Towers hotel in Harare, Mugabe and Tsvangirai signed the deal to resolve the crisis. According to the deal, Mugabe will remain president, Tsvangirai will become prime minister, the MDC will control the police, Mugabe's ZANU–PF party will command the Army, and Mutambara will become deputy prime minister. Tendai Biti was confirmed as the Finance Minister in the GNU and sworn in on Wednesday 11 November 2009.

=== 2014 purported suspension of Tsvangirai and other leaders ===
After months of in-fighting following Tsvangirai's 2013 presidential bid, a group of party officials purported to suspend Tsvangirai for "remarkable failure of leadership," during a meeting of the National Council. Tsvangirai was accused of creating a divisive atmosphere within the party. Six other leaders were suspended at the same time, furthering the political split within the MDC. Douglas Mwonzora, a spokesperson for the party and one of the suspended leaders, accused former Finance Minister and MDC general secretary Tendai Biti of helping Mugabe oust Tsvangirai. Tendai Biti and others involved in the incident went on to form the MDC-Renewal, which became the People's Democratic Party (Zimbabwe).

=== 2018–2022 splits ===
The MDC-T survived to see Mugabe removed from office in November 2017, but Tsvangirai was afflicted by colon cancer and died on 14 February 2018. Nelson Chamisa became acting president of the party and contested as the party's presidential candidate in the 2018 Zimbabwean general election under the MDC Alliance electoral pact.

On 22 April 2018, Thokozani Khuphe was elected unopposed as the President of her MDC-T faction at an extraordinary congress in Bulawayo.

After the election, the three member parties who were splinters of the original MDC (MDC-T, MDC-N and PDP) reunited to form a single political party under the name MDC-Alliance. Nelson Chamisa was elected president of the party at the MDC Congress held in May 2019. Then on 28 May 2020, the court ruled that MDC-A is a party.

In April 2020, Khupe is recognized as MDC-T by Supreme Court. In December 2020 Khupe was removed from the position of party president by Douglas Mwonzora amid strong claims of violence and cheating from her fans.

In September 2021, Douglas Mwonzora took over of MDC Alliance.

In January 2022, Chamisa founded the Citizens Coalition For Change (CCC). He is backed by Welshman Ncube and Tendai Biti. In March, Khuphe urged Zimbabweans to vote for the CCC in that month's by-election.

== Political performance ==
Tsvangirai and Mutambara failed to unite on a single MDC candidate for the March 2008 presidential election. Tsvangirai ran for president while Mutambara backed the independent candidacy of Simba Makoni. In the election, Tsvangirai won 47.9% of the vote according to Zimbabwe Electoral Commission results, ahead of Mugabe's 43.2%, necessitating a run-off because neither candidate won a majority. However, Tsvangirai claimed to have won a narrow first-round majority on 50.3% based on the mandatory posting of votes counted at polling booths.

In the simultaneous parliamentary election, both factions contested most seats, with the Tsvangirai faction winning 99 and the Mutambara faction 10, compared with 97 for Zanu PF, 1 independent, leaving 3 vacancies caused by deaths of candidates.

On 28 April 2008, the two factions of the MDC announced that they were reuniting, thus enabling them to have a clear parliamentary majority but without a formal merger between the factions.

International media reported that MDC members and supporters, including prominent activist Tonderai Ndira who was murdered in May, were subjected to arrests, beatings and killings during the campaign period for the second round of the election.

On 22 June 2008, Tsvangirai announced at a press conference that he was withdrawing from the run-off against Mugabe, due to be held on 27 June, describing it as a "violent sham" and saying that his supporters risked being killed if they voted for him. He vowed that the MDC would ultimately prevail and that its victory could "only be delayed".

== Notable party members ==
- Morgan Tsvangirai, former President of the Movement for Democratic Change, who died in February 2018 of colon cancer.
- Thokozani Khuphe, Former Deputy Prime Minister, vice-president and Member of Parliament for Makokoba
- Lovemore Moyo, National Chairman and Speaker of House of Assembly; Member of Parliament for Matobo North
- Nelson Chamisa, Acting President of the party; Former Minister of Communications; Member of Parliament for Kuwadzana Central
- Elias Mudzuri, Organising Secretary; Former Minister of Public Works; Member of Parliament for Warren Park and former Executive Mayor of Harare
- Eddie Cross, MDC Policy Coordinator General and Member of Parliament for Bulawayo South
- Roy Bennett, MDC Treasurer-General and Former Deputy Minister of Agriculture designate, who died in January 2018 in a helicopter crash
- Thamsanqa Mahlangu, MDC National Youth chairman; Former Deputy Minister of Employment Creation Gender & Youth Affairs & Member of Parliament for Nkulumane
- Felix Magalela Mafa Sibanda, MDC Provincial Spokesperson and Member of Parliament for Magwegwe Bulawayo
- David Anthony Chimhini, Founding member of MDC, first MDC National Administrator at its foundation in 1999 and MP for Mutasa North
- Tendai Biti, former Secretary General of the MDC, MDC-T, current Vice President of the Citizen's Coalition for Change and former Finance Minister of Zimbabwe 2009 to 2013.

== Electoral history ==
=== Presidential elections ===
| Election | Candidate | Votes | % | Votes | % | Result |
| Election | Candidate | First round | | Second round | | Result |
|---|---|---|---|---|---|---|
| 2008 | Morgan Tsvangirai | 1,195,562 | 47.9% | 233,000 | 9.3% | Lost ✗ |
| 2013 | Morgan Tsvangirai | 1,172,349 | 33.94% | — | — | Lost ✗ |
| 2018 | Thokozani Khupe | | 0.96% | — | — | Lost ✗ |
| 2023 | Douglas Mwonzora | 28,883 | 0.65% | — | — | Lost ✗ |

=== House of Assembly elections ===
| Election | Party leader | Votes | % | Seats | +/– | Position | Result |
|---|---|---|---|---|---|---|---|
| 2008 | Morgan Tsvangirai | 1,041,176 | 42.88% | 99 / 210 | ▲59 | ▲1st | MDC-T–ZANU-PF coalition government |
| 2013 | Morgan Tsvangirai | 1,027,412 | 30.29% | 70 / 270 | ▼29 | ▼2nd | Opposition |
| 2018 | Thokozani Khuphe | | 3.03% | 1 / 270 | ▼69 | ▼3rd | Opposition |
| 2023 | Douglas Mwonzora | 5,307 | 0.34% | 0 / 280 | ▼1 | 3rd | Extra-parliamentary |

=== Senate elections ===
| Election | Party leader | Votes | % | Seats | +/– | Position | Result |
|---|---|---|---|---|---|---|---|
| 2008 | Morgan Tsvangirai | 1,035,824 | 43.04% | 24 / 93 | ▲24 | ▲2nd | MDC-T–ZANU-PF governing coalition |
| 2013 | Morgan Tsvangirai | 1,008,023 | 29.85% | 21 / 80 | ▼3 | 2nd | Opposition |
| 2018 | Thokozani Khuphe | | | 1 / 80 | ▼20 | ▼3rd | Opposition |
| 2023 | Douglas Mwonzora | | | 0 / 80 | ▼25 | ▼ -- | Extra-parliamentary |

== See also ==
- 44 Harvest House
- History of Zimbabwe
- MDC Congress 2005
- Politics of Zimbabwe
- Movement for Democratic Change – Mutambara
