= Christopher Chingosho =

Zimbabwean politician

Member of the National Assembly of Zimbabwe for Headlands
- Incumbent
- Assumed office June 2015
- Preceded by: Didymus Mutasa

Deputy Minister of Local Government and Housing of Zimbabwe
- In office 2016 – December 2018
- President: Robert Gabriel Mugabe
- Minister: Saviour Kasukuwere

Personal details
- Born: 21 June 1952 (age 74) Rusape, Southern Rhodesia
- Party: ZANU–PF
- Education: National University of Lesotho (BPA); University of Zimbabwe (MPA, MS)

Christopher Peter Mutekwatekwa Chingosho (born 21 June 1952) is a Zimbabwean politician who is currently a member of the National Assembly of Zimbabwe for Headlands since 2015. He also served as deputy minister of local government and housing from 2017 to 2018. Previously, he worked in several government ministries and as a district and provincial administrator. He is a member of ZANU–PF, having joined the party in Mozambique during the Rhodesian Bush War in 1975.

== Early life, education, and revolutionary activity ==
Chingosho was born on 21 June 1952 in Rusape, Manicaland Province, Southern Rhodesia (now Zimbabwe). He attended Nyamutumbu Secondary School through sixth form, before completing his Advanced Levels at St. Augustine's Mission in Penhalonga. In 1972, he began teaching at Shamu Primary School in Murewa District.

On 15 March 1975, Chingosho went to join the liberation movement in Mozambique, where the Zimbabwe African National Union (ZANU) was based during the Rhodesian Bush War. In 1978, he went to study at the National University of Lesotho in Roma, Lesotho. There, he was a founding member of ZANU's Lesotho branch in 1979, and was elected as the branch's first chief of security. He also worked part-time as principal of the World University Service night school that operated out of the university. He graduated with a Bachelor of Public Administration in 1981. He also holds master's degrees in public administration and international relations from the University of Zimbabwe.

== Political career ==
After independence in 1980, Chingosho worked for the Ministry of Manpower. He served as an administrator at the district and provincial level for more than 25 years. In 1987, he was elected chairman of the Chipinge District Unity Accord between ZANU and ZAPU. From 1988 to 1992, he served on ZANU–PF's Manicaland Provincial Committee, and was promoted to the position of provincial secretary for publicity and information. From 1994 to 2004, he served as the party's Manicaland provincial secretary for administration. He served as the provincial administrator for Mashonaland East Province from 2000 to 2005. He also worked as a director and principal director at the Ministry of Women's Affairs, as recently as 2015.

In 2000, Chingosho ran unsuccessfully for Parliament in the Mutare Central constituency. He lost with 3,091 votes to the Movement for Democratic Change's Innocent Gonese, who received 17,706 votes.

In 2013, Chingosho attempted to challenge incumbent MP Didymus Mutasa in the primary to represent ZANU–PF in the Headlands constituency in the upcoming parliamentary election. Though he had been recommended to run by ZANU–PF directorates at the district, provincial, and national levels, his candidacy was disqualified in a controversial decision by the party's politburo. The politburo was then populated by members of Vice-President Joice Mujuru's faction within the party, whereas Chingosho was allied with Emmerson Mnangagwa. Two years later, Mutasa was expelled from ZANU–PF and recalled from the National Assembly, and Chingosho won the primary to represent the party in the upcoming by-election. He won the April 2015 primary with 3,557 out of 7,580 votes in a field of five candidates. He won the by-election on 10 June 2015, and became MP for Headlands, the largest parliamentary constituency in Zimbabwe.

He was reelected in the 2018 general election after defeating seven other candidates in the ZANU–PF primary.

From 2016 until December 2018, Chingosho served as deputy minister of local government and housing. In April 2017, he was assaulted by party youth after he accused ZANU–PF Youth League leader Kudzanai Chipanga of undermining his campaign in his constituency. In August 2017, he illegally occupied a farm in Makoni District before he was ordered off the property by High Court justice Loice Matanda Moyo. In November 2017, he almost fought with Manicaland provincial affairs minister in an incident in which he entered her office without an appointment. In November 2017, Chingosho was the victim of an automobile collision near Kwekwe while driving back from a presidential rally in Bulawayo. He was hospitalized in Kwekwe before being moved to West End Hospital in Harare, where he was discharged with a fractured hand.

== Personal life ==
Christopher Chingosho is married to Atang Mary Chingosho with five children namely Chipo, Thadeus, Tapiwa, Ephraim and Julia. He lives in the Headlands area of Makoni District. His interests include politics, reading, and going to church.

== Electoral history ==
2000 election, Mutare Central
Candidate	Party	Votes	%
Innocent Gonese	MDC	17,706	79.35
Christopher Chingosho	ZANU–PF	3,091	13.85
Patrick Chitaka	Independent	985	4.41
Felix Murimi	Independent	754	3.38
Moses Mvenge	Independent	324	1.45
Naison Sithole	ZANU–Ndonga	83	0.37
Total		22,313	100

2015 ZANU–PF primary election, Headlands
Candidate	Party	Votes	%
Christopher Chingosho	ZANU–PF	3,557	46.93
William Chiripamberi	ZANU–PF	2,218	29.26
Sheila Mahere-Nyagumbo	ZANU–PF	659	8.69
Tinaye Chigudu	ZANU–PF	650	8.58
Elizabeth Mukungatu	ZANU–PF	444	5.86
Invalid votes		52	–
Total		7,580	100
