= Merfyn Turner =

Welsh prison social worker and author (1915–1991)

- Born: Merfyn Lloyd Turner; 20 October 1915; Penygraig, Rhondda, Wales, United Kingdom
- Died: 6 August 1991 (aged 75); London, England, United Kingdom
- Occupations: Prison social worker; author

Merfyn Lloyd Turner (20 October 1915 – 6 August 1991) was a Welsh prison social worker and author. In World War II he was refused recognition as a conscientious objector, which led in turn to his refusing to submit to a medical examination as an essential preliminary to call-up; for this refusal he was sentenced to three months imprisonment, giving him a life-long concern for prison reform. On release from prison, he was allowed registration as a conscientious objector, and joined the Pacifist Service Unit in Tiger Bay, Cardiff. In 1944 he moved to the settlement Oxford House, Bethnal Green, joining fellow conscientious objectors Guy Clutton-Brock, John Raven and Peter Kuenstler. In 1954, he opened Norman House as a halfway home for people leaving prison.

He appeared as a castaway on the BBC Radio programme Desert Island Discs on 30 July 1962.

== Bibliography ==
- —— (1953). Ship without Sails. An account of the Barge Boys' Club, etc. Hutchinson & Co.
- —— (1961). Safe Lodging the Road to Norman House. Hutchinson & Co.
- —— (1964). A pretty sort of prison. Hutchinson & Co.

=== Papers ===
- Turner, Merfyn (1969). "The Lessons of Norman House". The Annals of the American Academy of Political and Social Science. 381 (1): 39–46. doi:10.1177/000271626938100106. ISSN 0002-7162. S2CID 144290369.
