= Headlands (constituency) =

Constituency of the Parliament of Zimbabwe

- Constituency for the National Assembly of Zimbabwe
- Province: Manicaland
- Region: Makoni District

Current constituency
- Created: 2008
- Seats: 1
- Party: ZANU–PF
- Member(s): Farai Mapfumo
- Created from: Makoni North

Headlands is a constituency represented in the National Assembly of the Parliament of Zimbabwe. Reportedly the country's largest, it was created in 2008 with territory taken from the Makoni North constituency. Located in Makoni District in Manicaland Province, its current MP since the 2023 general election is Farai Mapfumo of ZANU–PF.

== Profile ==
Headlands constituency is located in Makoni District in Manicaland Province, and covers the areas of Anoldine, Chiendambuya, Eagles Nest, Headlands, Inyati, and Monte Casino. As of 2015, it consists of eight wards: 6, 7, 8, 10, 12, 32, 34, and 37. The constituency had 25,806 registered voters in 2008, and a total population of 56,062 in 2012, of which 27,542 were males and 28,520 were females. The main source of livelihood for constituents in Headlands is small-scale farming. It is a tobacco farming area with some timber plantations also located in the constituency. It is reportedly the largest constituency in Zimbabwe.

== History ==
Headlands was created in 2008 with territory taken from the Makoni North constituency. In the 2008 election, Didymus Mutasa won the seat for ZANU–PF with 7,257 votes, and was reelected in the 2013 election with 10,975 votes. The seat fell vacant in 2015 when Mutasa was expelled from ZANU–PF, and was thus automatically recalled from parliament in accordance with Section 129 (1) (k) of the Constitution of Zimbabwe. A by-election was held on 10 June 2015, which was won by Christopher Chingosho of ZANU–PF. Chingosho was reelected in the 2018 election. In the 2023 election, the seat was won by ZANU–PF's Farai Mapfumo.

== Members ==
Election	Name	Party
2008	Didymus Mutasa	ZANU–PF
2013	Didymus Mutasa	ZANU–PF
2015 by-election	Christopher Chingosho	ZANU–PF
2018	Christopher Chingosho	ZANU–PF
2023	Farai Mapfumo	ZANU–PF

== See also ==
- List of Zimbabwean parliamentary constituencies
