= Walter L. Neustatter =

German-born British doctor (1903–1978)

Walter Lindesay Neustätter (7 December 1903 – 6 July 1978) was a German-born British doctor, consultant psychiatrist and forensic psychiatrist.

He was the vice-president of the Medico-Legal Society, which worked with the Abortion Law Reform Association to pass the Abortion Act 1967, which decriminalised abortion in the United Kingdom. He was a founding member of the British Academy of Forensic Sciences.

== Background ==
Walter Lindesay Neustätter was born in Munich, Germany, to a German Jewish father Otto Neustätter and his Australian wife Ada Lilian Lindesay-Richardson. Walter Neustätter's aunt, Ethel Florence Lindesay Richardson was a noted Australian author (she wrote under the penname "Henry Handel Richardson"). The family had a long history in medicine on both sides, his father was an MD and his maternal grandfather was also an MD. His parents divorced when he was only four years old, with Neustätter's father migrating to the United States, while his mother came to England.

Once in England, Neustätter's mother married for a second time to A. S. Neill and the two were involved in progressivist education, founding the Summerhill School together at Leiston: it was adjacent to communist politics in Britain and the School later involved in sex scandal controversies, where Neustätter's stepfather encouraged sexual activities between students among themselves and between students and teachers (inspired by the principles of Wilhelm Reich). Neustätter himself was educated from 1913 to 1921 at King Alfred's School, Hampstead, before moving on to London University and University College Hospital Medical School, qualifying as a doctor in 1929.

== Psychiatry and psychotherapy ==
After graduating from the University College Hospital Medical School, Neustätter was the psychotherapist at the Maudsley Hospital from 1931 until 1936. Following this, he worked at Guy's Hospital as a research assistant for the American-based Rockefeller Trust from 1936 until 1939. He was appointed as Physician in Psychological Medicine at Queen Mary's Hospital for the East End in 1938 and then a similar position at Royal Northern Hospital in 1948, a position he remained in until his retirement from the National Health Service.

== Abortion Act 1967 ==
Neustätter had become the Vice-Present of the London-based Medico-Legal Society in 1964 and as part of its activities became directly involved in the process of decriminalising abortion in the United Kingdom. Along with medico-legal advisors Peter Diggory, Eliot Slater and David Paintin, Neustätter was one of the medico-legal advisors belonging to the Abortion Law Reform Association (ALRA) under Vera Houghton, who advised Lord Lewis Silkin, 1st Baron Silkin and David Steel, later Lord Steel of Aikwood, during the parliamentary debates that resulted in the Abortion Act 1967. Neustätter was opposed to any legal exception under the grounds of conscientious objection for doctors who do not wish to carry out abortions. In 1968, he was one of the founding members on the advisory panel of Pregnancy Advisory Service (PAS) at a meeting called by Alan Golding, Sara Abel and Sylvia Ponsonby, which sought to direct women about ways they could get rid of "unwanted pregnancy" in the aftermath of the passing of the Act.

== Personal life ==
Neustätter married Mary Clutton-Brook in January 1941 at Surrey and had two children. Mary's brother Guy Clutton-Brock and his wife Molly Clutton-Brock, were among the founding members of the Southern Rhodesia African National Congress.

== Bibliography ==
- Modern Psychiatry in Practice (1936)
- The Mind of the Murderer (1956)
- Psychological Disorder and Crime (1957)
- Psychiatry in Medical Practice (1958)
- Abortion and the Psychiatrist (1963)
