= Robert Muponde =

Zimbabwean writer

Robert Muponde (born 1966) is a Zimbabwean writer and intellectual. He is currently Personal Professor at University of the Witwatersrand in Johannesburg, South Africa, where he has been based for over twenty years.

== Background ==
Muponde was born in Rusape, a place he writes about in his recently published memoir, The Scandalous Times of a Book Louse. Rusape is also the town where Zimbabwe's famous writer, Dambudzo Marechera hailed from. It surrounded by farms, and sits between Harare and Mutare.

== Academic career ==
An avid student of literature, Muponde, studied at the University of Zimbabwe where he received an MA in English Literature. He subsequently taught at many secondary schools, before he was appointed head and coordinator of literary studies at Zimbabwe Open University. In 2002, he joined the Wits Institute for Social & Economic Research (WiSER), at University of the Witwatersrand, as part of its inaugural cohort of doctoral students. He stayed on at University of the Witwatersrand and made his home in the English department where he has been a lecturer and now full professor.

== Writing ==
Muponde is a notable writer of short stories. But as a writer-intellectual, he has always been invested in building the structures and infrastructures for sustainable Zimbabwean literary futures. He was founding vice-chairperson of the Budding Writers Association of Zimbabwe (BWAZ) between 1990 and 1994; an editor at College Press between 1995 and 1997; and also served on the board of the Dambudzo Marechera Trust.

== Publications ==
- No More Plastic Balls: New Voices in the Zimbabwean Short Story (College Press, 2000)
- Signs and Taboos (Weaver Press, 2002)
- Versions of Zimbabwe: New Approaches to Literature and Culture (Weaver Press, 2005)
- Manning the Nation: Father Figures in Zimbabwean Literature and Society (Weaver Press, 2007)
- Some Kinds of Childhood: Images of History and Resistance in Zimbabwean Literature (Africa World Press, 2015)
- Whilst the Harvest Rots (Goodman Gallery, 2017)
- The Scandalous Times of a Book Louse (Penguin, 2021)
