= Eileen Haddon =

South African journalist and activist

- Born: 1921; Boksburg
- Citizenship: South Africa
- Education: South Africa institute of race relations
- Occupation: Journalist

Eileen Haddon (1921–2003) was a South African journalist and activist.

== Life ==
Eileen Haddon was born on 9 March 1921 in Boksburg, a South African mining town. She started studying medicine at the University of the Witwatersrand, but could not afford to complete the course. In October 1942 she married Michael Haddon, and lived in the United Kingdom while he served in the Royal Marines.

After the war ended the couple returned to South Africa, where she was active in the South African Institute of Race Relations and he took up goldmining. They moved to Southern Rhodesia after apartheid was institutionalized in South Africa in 1948. In the early 1950s they helped to found the Interraial Association, and she became chair. Influenced by Guy and Molly Clutton-Brock, they were also active in Garfield Todd's United Rhodesia Party. After the 1959 Unlawful Organizations Act, the couple helped to establish the Legal Aid and Welfare Fund to help those imprisoned for political activity. They also donated their smallholding outside Salisbury, Col Comfort Farm, as the base for a multiracial cooperative led by the Clutton-Brocks, Didymus Mutasa and others.

In 1960 Haddon joined the Central African Examiner, a progressive newspaper based in Salisbury. She became editor in 1962. In December 1965 the government forced the newspaper to close, and Haddon's husband Michael was himself jailed for three years. Forced to sell his mine, in 1969 the couple moved to Britain and then Zambia. Haddon worked as publicity officer for the University of Zambia from 1971 to 1977. After Zimbabwe's independence, she and Michael returned to live in Harare in 1981. She continued to work there as a liberal journalist, and was a friend of the Zimbabwean journalist Willie Musururwa.

Haddon survived her husband Michael, who died in 1996. She herself died on 6 July 2003. Her papers are held at the Borthwick Institute for Archives.
