= Mwuetsi =

Heroic figure in the mythology of Makoni tribe in Zimbabwe

Mwuetsi is a heroic figure in the mythology of Makoni tribe in Zimbabwe. He is part of Makoni creation myth, serving the role of the first human created by the sky god, Maori.

== Legend ==
Mwuetsi is named after the moon, and was given a ngona horn by Maori on his birth. Mwuetsi originally lived in the bottom of a lake, before he was asked to be moved to land. Maori warned Mwuetsi that what awaits him on land is his death, but Mwuetsi insisted, and in the end, Maori acquiesced. Maori also gave Mwuetsi a wife, Massassi, who represented the morning star. However, Massassi was only supposed to be Mwuetsi's wife for two years. During this period, she gave birth to the plant life on earth.

Massassi returned to Maori after two years, and Mwuetsi mourned her deeply which led to Maori giving him another wife, Morongo, the evening star. Unlike his relationship with Massassi, Mwuetsi had sexual intercourse with Morongo. As a result of their union, on the first and second day, Morongo gave birth to farm animals. And by the third night, she gave birth to another human being. Maori was not pleased with Morongo and Mwuetsi's union and asked them to cease their action. They chose to continue anyway, and by the fifth night, Morongo had given birth to dangerous animals, such as lions, scorpions, and snakes.

After some time, Mwuetsi continued to have children with his daughters, and ended up being the leader of humankind. One night, Mwuetsi was bitten by a snake, and was left severely ill. Draught came as soon as Mwuetsi was incapacitated. To stop this, an oracle told Mwuetsi's children that they have to kill and drown Mwuetsi in the lake that he originally came from, which they eventually did.

== See also ==
- List of African mythological figures
