= St Faith's School, Rusape =

Coordinates: 18.4886°S 32.2199°E

St Faith's High School, Manicaland

Location
- Private Bag 8001 Rusape; Manicaland; Zimbabwe

Information
- Type: Anglican Boarding high school
- Motto: Faith and Fidelity
- Established: 1966
- Headmaster: A Makamba
- Grades: Form 1 - Upper Six
- Age: 12 to 19
- Enrollment: 700 - 800
- Colors: Maroon; Gold
- Yearbook: Shining Star
- Affiliation: Anglican
- Website: www.stfaithshighschool.co.zw

St Faith's High School ( registered as St Faith's Secondary School), Rusape, Manicaland is a mission school 17 km from Rusape, Zimbabwe.

== History ==
St Faith's Mission was established by Anglican missionaries around 1903. From the time it was established, people from the local communities like Makoni Farm, Madzangwe, and Madetere villages were employed there. Beniah Taiseni Makoni one of the most prominent inhabitants of the Mission farm was employed by the nuns as a cook. Beniah was the son of King Ndapfunya Makoni the son of Nyakurukwa. Ndapfunya was brother to the late King Chingaira Makoni, who was beheaded by white settlers in 1896 during the wars by settlers under Cecil John Rhodes to subdue the local communities under the British South Africa Company (BSACo). Beniah married Edith (Edesi) Ruwona, the daughter of Wilson, a local man of the Mbire clan.

St Faith's Secondary School for Boys was established as a direct byproduct of the Mission. It started life as a primary school in the early 1920s, later becoming a boarding school for both boys and girls. The nuns ran the girls' dormitories for years.

In 1949 Molly and Guy Clutton-Brock arrived. They had been sent because the farm was not thriving and the charity anticipated that it might be taken over by the Rhodesian government. It was anticipated that strong management would be established, but instead a co-operative was formed. John Mutasa and Didymus Mutasa assisted the Clutton-Brocks in creating a radical agricultural settlement. The resulting community was known for its resistance to the Smith regime.

The secondary school for boys was then established around 1965 on the site of the primary school. That meant St. Faith's ceased being a boarding school for primary school children. The Primary School moved across the Jordan River to the old Clutton Broke Farm. The Secondary School became one of the few non-government secondary schools in the country.

In 1961, the Mission was disbanded to make way for the boys' secondary school. The Mission Farm was cut into small parcels of land and distributed to the Mission workers. Smaller parcels of land were distributed free of charge and the bigger farms were sold to some of the Mission workers. Beniah Makoni bought Farm No 1 Mbobo Flats, as the land parcels became popularly known. Forms 5 and 6 were introduced in 1987.

The school is symbolized by a buffalo (a totem for the Makoni (Nyati) clan) under whose traditional jurisdiction the school is built.

In 2021, the Anglican Diocese set out its intentions to privatise the school and required all new students to pay a $600 mission fund despite opposition from the headmaster, resulting in a push by the Diocese to try and remove the headmasterhttps://www.herald.co.zw/church-wants-st-faiths-head-out/

== Notable alumni ==
Didymus Mutasa

== Current administation ==
- Head Master A Makamba
- Deputy Head I Mudangwe
