= Estrid Dane =

Danish paediatrician and healer (1891-1977)

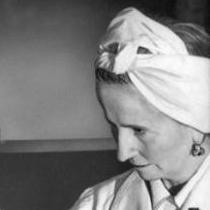
- Born: Estrid Lassen; 27 November 1891; Copenhagen
- Died: 17 August 1977 (aged 85); Fredriksberg
- Occupation: Paediatrician
- Known for: exponent of therapy for children's bones

Estrid Dane (born Estrid Lassen; married name: Estrid Reichenheim; 27 November 1891 – 17 August 1977) was a Danish paediatrician and healer. She worked with young children in London and with Mother Teresa in Calcutta.

== Work ==
She was born on 27 November 1891 in Copenhagen. Her parents were Ebba von Schau and Axel Frederik Julius Christian Lassen. Her father had been married before to Jane Crawford Hewetson who had died in 1885. In 1914 she married Georg Henning von Oertzen and that marriage was dissolved in 1922.

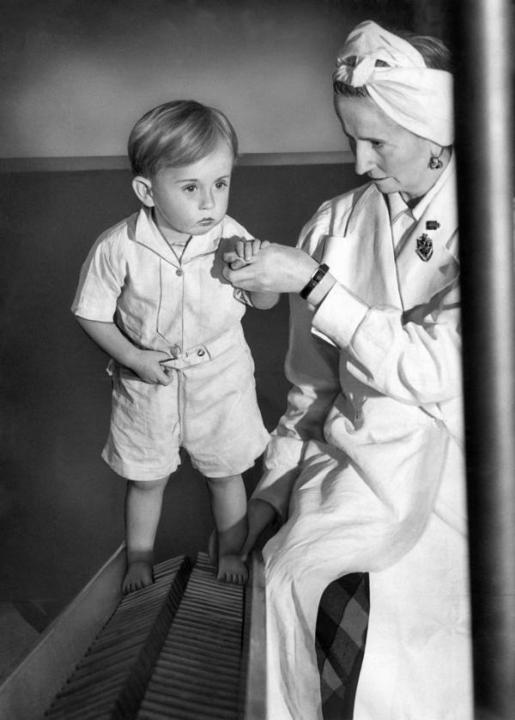
Estrid Dane in 1943 conducting therapy for rickets.

On 27 February 1929 she remarried in London. She had married a German Jew named Peter Reichenheim. He was an engineer and they were living in England in the 1930s where anti-semitism was not unusual. To avoid this the two of them changed their name to Dane.

In 1938, she began to train in the techniques of therapeutic gymnastics by Detleff Neumann-Neurode. She had been convinced of the technique's success when it had been used to heal her own children. Later, with the support of the British War Relief Society she started a clinic at St. Marys Hospital in East London. She had been advised to not mention that it was a German therapy during the war but she had refused to remove the attribution to the technique's developer. She was also featured in the book the City of Joy.

Her husband died in Mallorca in 1958.

A 1969 BBC profile of her work featured an interview with a surgeon who said: "There's no question about what she achieves, but I'm damned if I know how she does it".

When she was in her seventies she began to lose her sight, but undeterred she went to Calcutta for two years where she worked with Mother Teresa. She used her time to train the nuns there in the techniques she had learned to assist children.

She died on 17 August 1977 in Frederiksberg.
