= Rusape River =

River in Zimbabwe

Rusape River is a long inland water river stretching from the almost evergreen Nyanga regions to Save river in Zimbabwe. It is known to be usually flooded during summer and has numerous myth stories associated with it. Rusape river is the major feeding river to Rusape dam in the outskirts of Rusape town as well as to irrigate sugarcane and wheat estates in the Lowveld. Stream bank cultivation and illegal sand abstraction is contributing to siltation of Rusape river which flows into the Rusape dam.
