= Didymus Mutasa =

Zimbabwean politician

The Honourable Didymus Mutasa
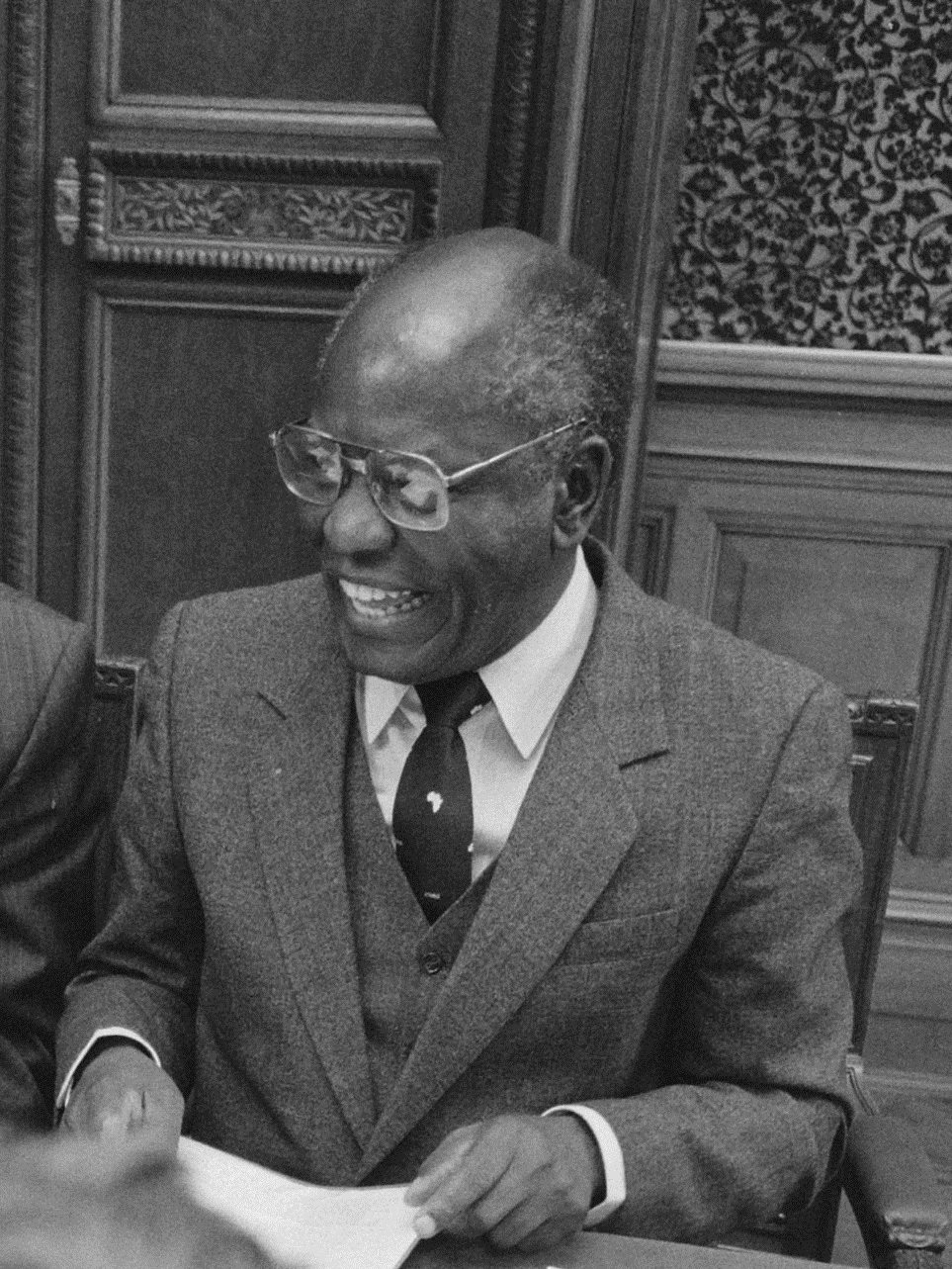
- Mutasa (1988)

Minister of State for Presidential Affairs
- In office 13 February 2009 – 8 December 2014
- President: Robert Mugabe
- Prime Minister: Morgan Tsvangirai

Minister of State for National Security, Lands, Land Reform and Resettlement in the President's Office of Zimbabwe
- In office April 2005 – 13 February 2009
- President: Robert Mugabe
- Succeeded by: Sydney Sekeramayi

Minister of Special Affairs in the President's Office in charge of the Anti-Corruption and Anti-Monopolies Programme
- In office February 2004 – April 2005
- President: Robert Mugabe

Speaker of the House of Assembly of Zimbabwe
- In office 1980–1990
- President: Canaan Banana
- Prime Minister: Robert Mugabe
- Preceded by: John Ruredzo (Southern Rhodesia)
- Succeeded by: Nolan Makombe

Personal details
- Born: 27 July 1935 (age 91) Rusape, Southern Rhodesia
- Party: ZANU-PF
- Education: Fircroft College; University of Birmingham
- Occupation: Politician; farmer

Didymus Noel Edwin Mutasa (born 27 July 1935) is a Zimbabwean politician who served as Zimbabwe's Speaker of Parliament from 1980 to 1990. Subsequently, he held various ministerial posts working under President Robert Mugabe in the President's Office. He was Minister of State for Presidential Affairs from 2009 to 2014 and also served as ZANU-PF's Secretary for Administration.

== Family background and education ==
Didymus Mutasa was born in 1935 in Rusape, a town close to the Zimbabwe/Mozambique border in Africa. He was the sixth child of a devout Christian couple. He did his primary and secondary school at St Faith's, an Anglican Mission in Rusape.

Mutasa was a student of Fircroft College of Adult Education in Birmingham, UK, where he attended the Access to Higher Education Course. He studied at Birmingham University on a British Council scholarship. Mutasa was awarded the honorary degree of Doctor of Social Science (DSocSc) by the University of Birmingham in 1990.

== Political career ==
Before Zimbabwean independence, he was chairman of the Cold Comfort Farm society, a non-racial co-operative community near Salisbury (as it then was). This was located on a farm formerly belonging to Lord Acton. It was promoted by Guy and Molly Clutton-Brock and others. Mutasa was detained for two years without trial and the Clutton-Brocks were exiled. At independence Mutasa seized Cold Comfort Farm for himself.

Following independence, Mutasa was Zimbabwe's first Speaker of Parliament from 1980 to 1990. He has served as the Member of Parliament for Makoni North and as a member of the ZANU-PF Politburo; he is the party's Secretary for Administration and has also served as its Secretary for External Affairs.

In April 1998, Mutasa, in defending President Robert Mugabe, said that if Mugabe were pressed to step down, then the entire Cabinet and Politburo should step down along with him, because, in Mutasa's view, if Mugabe had truly "stayed for too long and misgoverned", then those who had governed with him, "including those who are calling on Mugabe to step down", must have done so as well. In 2002, he controversially said that it would be a good thing if the population were halved: "We would be better off with only six million people, with our own people who supported the liberation struggle. We don't want all these extra people."

He was appointed as Minister of Special Affairs in the President's Office in charge of the Anti-Corruption and Anti-Monopolies Programme on 9 February 2004; he was then appointed as State Security Minister in mid-April 2005, following the March 2005 parliamentary election, later Minister of State for National Security, Lands, Land Reform and Resettlement in the President's Office.

In the March 2008 parliamentary election, Mutasa was nominated by ZANU-PF as its candidate for the House of Assembly seat from Headlands constituency in Manicaland. He won the seat with 7,257 votes against 4,235 for Fambirayi Tsimba of the Movement for Democratic Change, according to official results.

Mutasa was identified with a faction in ZANU-PF that wanted vice-president Joice Mujuru to become President Mugabe's successor. In late 2014, the Mujuru faction was accused of plotting against Mugabe, and in that context Mutasa failed to win re-election to the ZANU-PF Central Committee in November 2014. He was dismissed from his ministerial post on 8 December 2014, at the same time that Mujuru and others allied with her lost their posts in the government.

== Background ==
In 2002 the Zimbabwean government seized the farms of ten citizens of the Netherlands who resided in Zimbabwe, ostensibly as part of the government's land reform. An international tribunal in Paris, France summoned Mutasa to testify about the seizure in November 2007. Mutasa acknowledged on 12 August 2007 that the Zimbabwean government took their farms without their permission and without compensating them monetarily. The farmers are represented by British lawyer Matthew Coleman, assisted by the International Centre for Settlement of Investment Disputes, and pay no legal fees as these are picked up by AgricAfrica, a British-Zimbabwean organisation. The court is expected to rule on their case by March 2008.

The farmers are asking for US$48 million (33 million euros) in compensation and the government has pledged to reimburse them when it is financially possible. If the government does not compensate the farmers and the court rules in their favour then they may seize any property of the government equivalent to what they are owed as long as that property is outside Europe, including foreign aid from the World Bank. The government also seized the farms of 50 Europeans, citizens of Switzerland, Germany, and Denmark who will soon be heard by the tribunal. The European Union sanctioned top-members of Zimbabwe's government with a visa ban in protest of the government's abuses, but lifted the sanction so Mutasa could defend the government at the tribunal. Similarly, he has been on the United States sanctions list since 2003.

On 12 June 2007, Mutasa announced the government planned to deport all whites, saying, "The position is that food shortages or no food shortages, we are going ahead to remove the remaining whites. Too many blacks are still clamoring for land and we will resettle them on the remaining farms." In December 2009 it was again claimed that Mutasa was behind some of the farm invasions.

== Film appearance ==
Didymus Mutasa is set to be featured in the Pan-African film Motherland (2009) as one of the speakers on land reform in Africa.

== See also ==
- Joint Operations Command
