= Detleff Neumann-Neurode =

German therapist

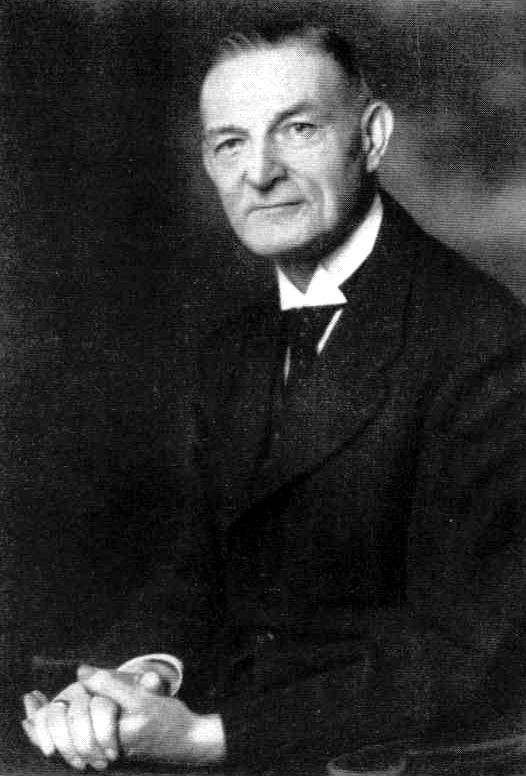

Friedrich Wilhelm Detleff Ehrgott Neumann-Neurode (July 12, 1879 – June 27, 1945) was a pioneering German pediatric physical therapist. He was born on his family's estate in Groß Woitsdorf, Upper Silesia (then part of the German Empire), and died in Aumühle near Hamburg, Germany.

== Early career ==
Detleff Neumann-Neurode was born as the son of the Prussian provincial elder Karl Neumann-Neurode, who owned a knight's estate there, and his wife Margarethe née Lübbert.

He joined the Prussian military and served in a grenadier regiment. During an assignment at the Military Exercise Academy in Berlin, where he taught physical training, Neumann-Neurode observed that regular exercise produced extraordinarily positive physical changes in himself and his students. He concludes that treatment involving active physical therapy at the earliest ages should be able to influence developmental defects.

At the Orthopedic University Clinic in Berlin, he familiarized himself with the day's standard treatment for curvature of the spine, which relied on passive measures rather than active treatment of the musculature.

He engaged in anatomical and physiological studies, and exercised with his own children. His first book Kindersport was published on December 1, 1909, and the second edition appeared in 1911 with a preface by Medical Officer of Health Prof. Dr. Heubner, Director of the Royal University Children's Clinic, and Dr. R. Klapp, Professor of Surgery at the University of Berlin. Four editions appeared, and were widely reviewed.

In 1921, Neumann-Neurode was discharged from military service and turned his attention entirely to the fight against crippling physical handicaps. Working with interested physicians, surgeons and orthopedists, he developed a method of infant gymnastics that was an effective means of assisting normal development. At the request of Professor Bier this method was now tested under Professor Langstein and introduced in the National Institute for the Elimination of Infant Mortality. In 1922 Neumann-Neurode founded the "Institute for Physical Exercise in Earliest Childhood" ("Anstalt für Körperübungen im frühesten Kindesalter") and began to teach his method.

== Adoption of methods ==
His methods were adopted by child-care workers In the leading children's hospitals, the Charité, the Empress-Auguste-Viktoria House and the Rachitics Institute of Berlin, and generally in social welfare institutes and infant-care homes.

In 1938, Neumann-Neurode met Professor Dr. Schede, the Director of the Orthopedic University Clinic of Leipzig and chief physician of "Humanitas", a home for the disabled. Dr. Schede set up a Neumann-Neurode Department, where children with the early stages of spinal and rachitic deformities were treated and normalized. The Department had a very high success rate.

Just as the general field of internal medicine gradually gave rise to pediatric medicine as a specialized subfield, the specialized field of baby and infant gymnastics also gradually acquired full status as part of general physiotherapy. After a two-year training course at the state-accredited physiotherapy schools, an additional half-year special course in baby and infant gymnastics as per the Neumann-Neurode Method was now required of caregivers.

Professor Dr. C. Mau, M.D., Director of the Orthopedic University Clinic in Hamburg Eppendorf, noted at that time that the field of orthopedic medicine had a considerable interest in the fact that the concept of baby and infant gymnastics is tied to the name Neumann-Neurode and is widely practiced, and deserves to be considered a valuable measure of preventive medicine.

In 1926 these considerations were decisive in bringing about the state accreditation of the Neumann-Neurode School in Berlin. At that time, Neumann-Neurode published several books, consisting primarily of illustrated instructions for the recommended exercises. The film company UFA was also interested, and produced a documentary in which Neumann-Neurode's three toddler granddaughters participated.

A Danish woman, Estrid Dane, was convinced by Neumann-Neurode's success with one of her own children, studied his techniques, and implemented them in Britain. She opened a clinic for children of poor families in the East End of London, and kept it going through the years of the Blitz, insisting on crediting Neumann-Neurode despite pressure to avoid using the German name. Mrs Dane continued this work for many years, and was the subject of a 1969 BBC film. In Johannesburg, South Africa a physiotherapist named Agnes Wenham who had studied under Neumann Neurode ran a very successful practice for many years using his methods. In Rhodesia and Botswana Molly Brock-Clutton created centres in the 1950s and 1960s to treat African children. She was able to train others having been trained in London during the second world war.

== Family ==
On September 30, 1902, Neumann-Neurode married Margarete Frieda Henriette Rampoldt, daughter of the royal district court president Julius Rampoldt and his wife Helene née Nölldechen, in Świdnica.

In 1935 Neumann-Neurode's daughter Ruth B. Neumann-Neurode had a weekly radio broadcast, called "Playing Gymnastics in the Kindergarten", every Friday on the Germany Station in Berlin (Deutschlandsender Berlin). She worked together with her father for many years and continued to run the Neumann-Neurode School long after his death.

The effects of war repeatedly forced the school to relocate. After being bombed to rubble in Berlin it was moved to Leipzig. In 1945 it was located in Aumühle near, Hamburg. After Neumann-Neurode's death Ruth Neumann-Neurode moved the School to Pähl, near Weilheim, in southern Germany, where her daughter, Margrit von Kleist, born Burckhardt, was employed as a teacher and also worked in a children's hospital established by the IRO (International Refugee Organisation) in Dorfen and headed by Dr. Fladerer.

== Legacy ==
The work of Neumann-Neurode is known the world over as an integral part of pediatric physiotherapy. Many sports programs and activities are available today for all age groups, and handicapped children are often integrated or have special programs. And for decades the infant and toddler gymnastics has been part of the therapy treatment in physiotherapy.

Granddaughter Margrit von Kleist immigrated to Canada and opened a school "ALL CHILDREN'S PROGRESSIVE GYM" in Toronto, Ontario. She integrated handicapped children into her program which was unknown at that time. In the beginning it was difficult to convince people that it is very beneficial for these children, but she succeeded successfully for many years. In 1986 Mrs. von Kleist retired and her daughter Christiane von Kleist continued the program until 2008. Unfortunately nobody is continuing the school and it is missed by many parents.

== Publications ==
- Detleff Neumann-Neurode. Säuglingsgymnastik. Leipzig, Quelle & Meyer [1944]., 4th ed. 1969. OCLC: 14732576
  - Translated as: Baby Gymnastics, by Detleff Neumann-Neurode and completely revised by Wendula Kaiser. Oxford: Pergamon Press, 1967.
    - Review, K. S. Holt Pediatrics Vol. 41 No. 5 May 1968, pp. 1020–1021. "A tribute to Neumann-Neurode, who devised a series of exercises for babies, and one part of the book describes how the techniques spread throughout Germany."
- Detleff Neumann‑Neurode,: "Kindersport. Körperübungen für das frühe Kindesalter." Leipzig: Quelle & Meyer, 1909 . 3rd ed. Potsdam, 1912.
  - Review, Jahrbuch fuer Kinderheilkunde und physische Erziehung [Yearbook for Child Health and Phsycial Education] 1913, "The useful we ll-illustrated book is in its new edition highly recommended to parents and nurses"

=== Further reading ===
- Agnes Wenham. Lend Baby A Hand: An illustrated guide to early posture care. William Heinemann Medical Books Ltd, London, 1980 ISBN 0-433-35400-3
