= Jews of Rusape =

Judaism-related religious group of Zimbabwe

The Jews of Rusape, Zimbabwe, are a group of people who practice a religion similar to Judaism. Their observance of Judaism is generally in accordance with that of mainstream Judaism practiced in other countries with the exception of a few key aspects. The Rusape Jews believe that although Jesus was not the Messiah, he was a prophet. They believe that he did not rise to heaven as is taught in Christianity, but was rather buried in Israel as a regular man. The community's origins are attributed to an individual known as William S. Crowdy, who came to the community in the late 19th or early 20th century.

== History ==
Crowdy was a Baptist deacon and former American slave. It is believed that Crowdy experienced a revelation in which he was told to initiate black people to Judaism. Within a short span of time after this revelation, Crowdy met Albert Christian, who settled in southern Africa and instructed his followers in the laws and customs of Judaism.

== Beliefs ==
The customs of the Rusape community are similar to the ones practiced in ancient times, prior to the Assyrian captivity. These traditions reflect both cultural and religious continuities within the community:

- The Rusape people practice burial of their dead in burial caves, a tradition reminiscent of ancient Jewish customs.
- A son of Rusape whose elder brother is dead will marry his brother's wife.
- The Rusape men are circumcised.
- Weekly prayers are conducted in the community's synagogue every Shabbat.

The Rusape people hold a distinctive belief regarding Jesus. They view Jesus not as the Messiah but as a prophet, and maintain that he did not ascend to heaven, contrary to Christian belief, but was instead buried as an ordinary human. Similar to pre-Assyrian exile Jewish practices, the Rusape community maintains many Jewish customs.
