= Tsanzaguru =

Coordinates: 18.651°S 32.109°E

Tsanzaguru (formerly Sanzaguru) is a township, commuter zone, in the province of Manicaland, Zimbabwe located 10 km south of Rusape in the Makoni West constituency. It is situated by the riverside overlying the Rusape Dam. Named after the kopje, Tsanzaguru, in the overlying village area of Headman Dzvairo, who is under Chief Makoni. The township is under Rusape Town Council and almost three quarters of the small employed population are employed by government either in the army, education or other government enterprises.

== History ==
The name Tsanzaguru is derived from the Rozvi meaning of a big, rocky and tall kopje from which the Rozvi were known to have wanted to build to the moon from there. They are said to have wanted to bring the moon to the King's Zunde Ramambo as a gift. It is from this background that all traditional Chiefs countrywide have their badges designed in a circular form resembling the circular dream moon that the Rozvi wanted to bring their king.

There are two main schools, Tsanzaguru Primary and Sanzaguru High School, all of which service the educational needs of the township and the neighbouring villages. It is serviced with a very good clinic.
