= Rusape Dam =

Man-made body of water in Zimbabwe

Rusape Dam is an in-land man-made water body in the outskirts of Rusape adjacent to Tsanzaguru, Zimbabwe, specifically built as a reservoir lake for irrigation in the usually dry southeastern part of Zimbabwe and water supply for the town of Rusape. It is usually 100% full due to its feeder river, the Rusape, originating from ever-green Eastern Highlands.

There have been suggestions that the dam has increased the incidence of flooding downstream.

A local legend has grown up that a mermaid "takes" a human sacrifice every year in the vicinity of the dam.
