= Young and Talented School of Stage and Screen =

Coordinates: 51.5264°N 0.0614°W

Young and Talented School of Stage and Screen (Y&T) is a London-based drama school located at Oxford House in Bethnal Green and The Broadway Theatre, in Barking. Y&T was founded in 2004 by actress and director Suzann McLean (Robinson) and has been running at the Barking and Dagenham College since 2013. The school won an Ebony Business Recognition Award in 2013 in the category of "Entertainment and Leisure" as well as the Jack Petchey Foundation Crystal Award in 2015. And has received positive reviews in East End Life and Muslim Weekly newspaper.

In August 2018, founder of Y&T has been appointed as artistic director of Theatre Peckham. Georgia Snow from 'The Stage' newspaper said in her article that 'Theatre Peckham is best known for providing accessible actor training and for its programmes for young people in inner-city London. McLean joins on September 3. The Chair of Trustees from Theatre Peckham said: 'As Chair of Theatre Peckham, I am thrilled to welcome Suzann McLean to the team. Suzann's rich experience in working with children and young people - directing, writing and producing - ensures she will carry forward the outstanding legacy of our founder, Teresa Early.

== Performances ==
The Real Deal performed on the Sport Relief does Glee Club television show in early 2012, described by judge Carrie Grant in one performance as "a masterclass in soloists – amazing". Carrie Grant cites Y&T as a performing arts school that has an amazing standard that would fit in America, a place where the future of British Music is born. In October 2013 The Real Deal won the semifinals of The Jack Petchey Glee Club Challenge 2013 in the Second London Regional semifinals. The final was held at the IndigO2 Arena in London where The Real Deal competed in the Challenge.

Young and Talented Performance Group competed on the Jack Petchey Glee Club Competition. They arrived in the finals and performed at the Queen Elizabeth Hall, winning second place. In 2015 they performed at the 10th Anniversary of the Screen Nation Film and Television Awards.

Y&T Rep Company was founded in 2011 as a subsidiary of Young and Talented School of Stage and Screen. Its productions have been:

- 2012: The Killing Class and "Cinderella Init! written by David Fielding,
- 2013: Jayden's War written by David Fielding
- 2014: Dying Out Loud presented at the brand new Arts venue Spotlight.
- 2018: Finding Home, Finding Hope presented as part of the Rich Mix Take Over Festival.

In 2015 Y&T were commissioned by the Pilot Theatre to create a play in response to their production of Roy William's Antigone. Students explored the ways of bringing Roy's play into the world of today's teenagers. Tig was directed by Suzann McLean, who is also an Associate Artist of Pilot Theatre. "Tig" was performed at the Broadway Theatre in February and at Theatre Royal Stratford East Schools' Festival in March.

In May 2016 the director Suzann McLean directed a play "Blackout" at Theatre Royal Stratford East as part of the National Youth Theatre Festival.

In 2016 Y&T produced their end of year production on the stage of Theatre Royal Stratford East. Lloyd Lewis-Hayter from Afridiziak described the show as a performance that explores the pros and cons of children using the Internet and more specifically social media.

At the end of each year the school presents a live performance inspired by the students' ideas. John Byrne described these as excellent end of term productions.

== Notable alumni ==
Reece Buttery starred as Mo in the 2013 CBBC children's drama The Dumping Ground. In December 2013 Reece Buttery was the lead in the BBC One's Comedy Boxing Day film "Gangsta Granny". Reece Buttery is now working on the series of 'The Secret Life of Boys'.

Jordan Benjamin stars in Rocket's Island, a CBBC production. Jordan is winner of BYA Awards 2014 - Youth In Excellence award in the category of Performing Arts Award.

Ellis George starred as Courtney Woods in Dr. Who. Other credits include The Killing Class, Cinderella Innit, The New Generation - A Youth Festival, 10 Year Anniversary Gala Y&T. Ellis. was part of the performing group called The Real Deal.

Laura Dajao is an ex-Y&T student, she is now a professional dancer and choreographer.

== Affiliations ==
The education awards Arts Awards are validated by Trinity College London in association with Arts Council England. Also it is accredited with Investors in People since 2013. Roy Alexander-Weise, a tutor at the school, was the BBC Theatre Fellow with the Lyric & Bush Theatres and is the Trainee Director at the Royal Court Theatre.

The school's patrons are:

- John Byrne
- Rochelle Gadd
- Bunmi Mojekwu
