= Guy Clutton-Brock =

Zimbabwean politician (1906–1995)

Arthur Guy Clutton-Brock (5 April 1906 – 29 January 1995) was an English social worker who became a Zimbabwean nationalist and co-founder of Cold Comfort Farm in what was then Rhodesia.

== Biography ==
Clutton-Brock was born at Lake View, Green Lane, Ruislip, Middlesex to a stockbroker, Henry Alan Clutton-Brock, and his wife, Rosa Gertrude Eleanor (née Bowles) Clutton-Brock. His uncle was the writer Arthur Clutton-Brock. He was educated at Rugby School, and graduated from Magdalene College, Cambridge. He had a career in the prison and probation services, youth and community work in the East End of London and in post-war Germany. He met his wife and partner Frances "Molly" Allen in 1934 and they were known as "the CBs". During the Second World War he ran Oxford House, Bethnal Green, 1940–44, with the assistance of John Raven, Peter Kuenstler and later Merfyn Turner, all four being conscientious objectors.

== Personal life ==
He and Molly had a daughter named Sarah-Anne in 1942. The couple emigrated to Southern Rhodesia in 1949 as an agricultural demonstrator and missionary, turning St Faith's Mission into a famous pioneering non-racial community. He joined in founding the Southern Rhodesia African National Congress in 1957, and was largely responsible for its non-racial and Black/White partnership policies. As a member, he was detained without trial in 1959.

== Cold Comfort Farm ==
After similar ventures in Bechuanaland and Nyasaland, he returned to Rhodesia. With the eloquent support of Trevor Huddleston, Fenner Brockway, Michael Scott, Mary Benson and many others, Guy, his wife Molly, Didymus Mutasa, George Nyandoro and Michael and Eileen Haddon founded Cold Comfort Farm in Southern Rhodesia, which became a widely acclaimed pattern for racial freedom and regeneration in the poverty-stricken countries of Africa.

He and Molly were deported by the Rhodesian government led by Ian Smith in 1971. They found a home in Wales where the two of them would write letters. They were the friends of four African presidents, Kenneth Kaunda (Zambia), Julius Nyerere (Tanzania), Hastings Banda (Malawi) and Seretse Khama (Botswana), as well as Robert Mugabe, who, as President of Zimbabwe, declared Clutton-Brock upon his death to be a National Hero of Zimbabwe, the first European to be accorded that honour. Clutton-Brock died at age 88 and was buried in Heroes' Acre outside Harare.
