= Makoni North =

- Constituency for the National Assembly of Zimbabwe
- Province: Manicaland
- Region: Makoni District

Current constituency
- Seats: 1
- Party: ZANU–PF
- Member: Joseph Muwombi

Makoni North is a constituency represented in the National Assembly of the Parliament of Zimbabwe, located in Makoni District in Manicaland Province. Its current MP since the 2023 general election is Joseph Muwombi of ZANU–PF.

== History ==
In the 2018 election, James Munetsi of ZANU–PF was elected MP for the constituency.

== See also ==
- List of Zimbabwean parliamentary constituencies
