= Oxford House (settlement) =

Cultural centre

Coordinates: 51°31′34.74″N 0°3′41.12″W

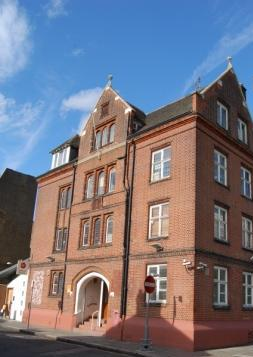
Oxford House

Oxford House in Bethnal Green, East London, was established in September 1884 as one of the first "settlements" by Oxford University as a High-Anglican Church of England counterpart to Toynbee Hall, established around the same time at Whitechapel.

== History ==
=== Foundation ===
Arising out of the philanthropic and social movement of the mid-Victorian age which had found support at the University of Oxford and from the Tractarianism (or Oxford Movement) of the High Anglican Church, the settlement movement sprang up primarily from the work of the Barnetts (Samuel, rector of Whitechapel, and his wife Henrietta), whose pioneering view saw the first steps to establishing Toynbee Hall. This was considered by some at Oxford, led by the Warden of Keble College, Edward Talbot, "not sufficiently religious enough" and it was this group of Oxford men who looked to provide a more ascetic, denominationally religious, settlement in the East End of London. The first premises used under the Oxford House name was the National Day School of the parish church of St Andrew at Bethnal Green, which provided lodgings for three or four graduates to reside and work in the local neighbourhood, providing help and assistance to the poor and dispossessed of the surrounding area through a variety of activities including boys' clubs, a "talk and smoke" club for working men, and Sunday afternoon Bible lectures.

The appointment of Arthur Winnington-Ingram as Head of Oxford House in 1889 and the ever-widening popularity of the programmes being run by the Oxford House necessitated a move to more substantial property. A substantial fundraising effort that followed included Henry Scott Holland's rallying-cry, "come and be the squires of East London" and Winnington-Ingram's plea to Oxford men that "if they would not come and live in Bethnal Green, they must at least supply a house for those who would." The appeal raised enough capital to purchase the land on which Oxford House now stands, and construct a solid red-brick 5-storey building, designed by the renowned architect Sir Arthur Blomfield. It was opened by the Duke of Connaught in 1892, and designated a Grade II listed building in 2011.

Oxford House continued to provide a hub for the community of Bethnal Green and began expanding by purchasing other properties to run the various clubs and activities associated with its work. These included the Excelsior hall and swimming baths at Mansford street, University Club buildings in Victoria Park square, and recreation grounds for sporting clubs further east at Walthamstow.

Similar University settlements also started in London (Cambridge House 1889, Bermondsey 1892, Docklands, Mansfield 1890) and other major cities in the UK (Manchester, Birmingham, Bristol) and abroad (New York, Chicago, Helsinki). Some were specifically established to address women and girls, such as St Margaret's and St Hilda's (both 1889) nearby. Oxford House also helped the Devas Club in Battersea south London, early in its development.

=== 20th century ===
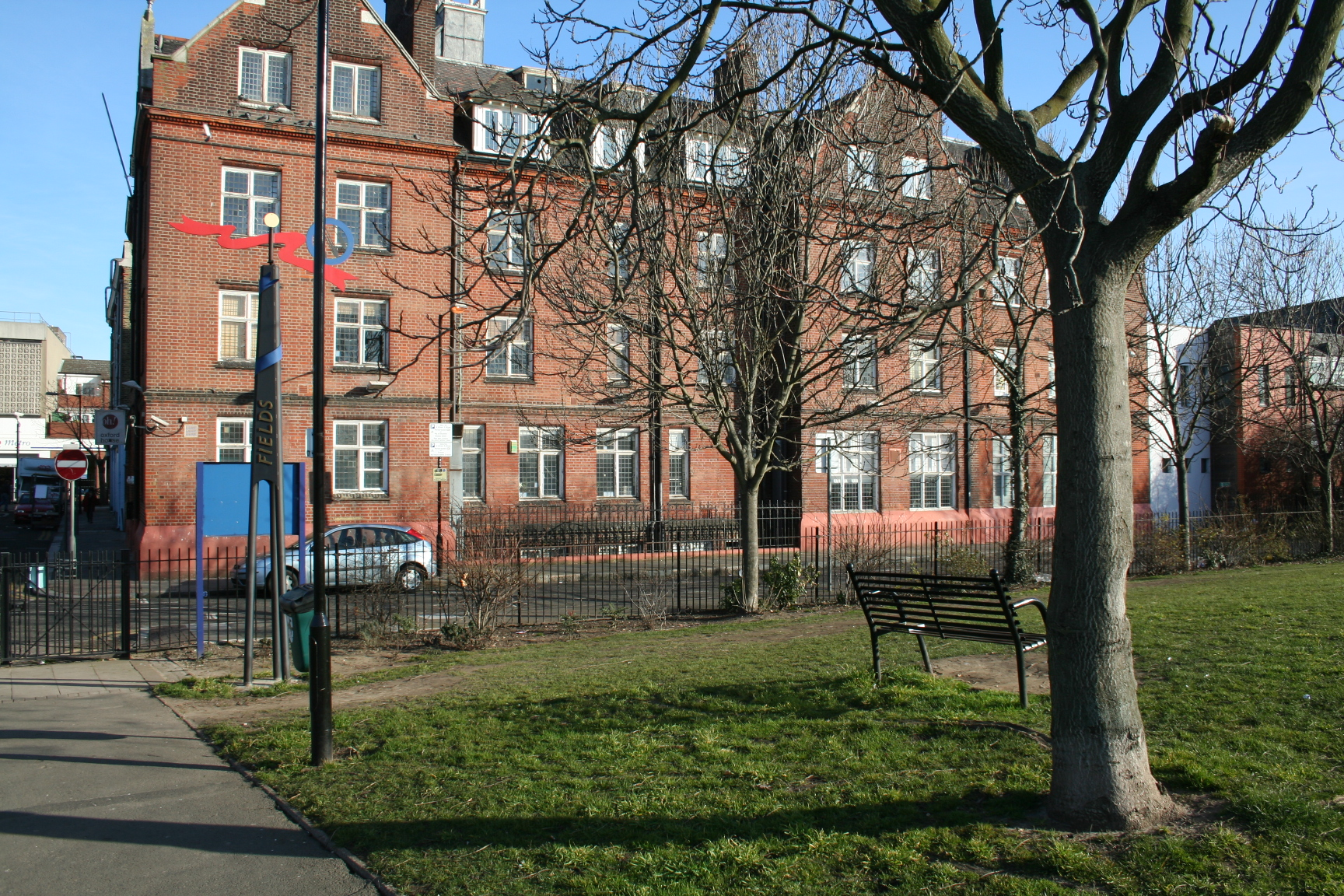
Oxford House in 2009

The start of World War I curtailed much of the House's activities, many Oxford graduates entering the army and leaving a shortage of resident volunteers. The building was temporarily used as a shelter from air raids during 1917.

After the war the House struggled to return to the pre-1914 levels of residents and volunteers, although it kept a number of boys' clubs and societies for working men going. Relations with the local clergy were fraught at times, as it was "felt that the boys' clubs were a counter attraction to their parochial ventures". Throughout the 1920s and 30s Oxford House, despite severe financial constraints, continued to provide charitable support to the local community, even during the depression, when Bethnal Green had one of the highest unemployment rates in London. The House established links with Berkhamsted, Repton and Chigwell Schools, primarily through sports such as football and cricket, in an attempt to bring boys of different social backgrounds together.

In 1931 on his visit to Britain, Mahatma Gandhi gave an impromptu speech at Oxford House, attracting a crowd of 3,000 people outside to cheer him. From 1933 the East End found itself the target of Anti-Semitic hatred through the activities of Oswald Mosley's British Union of Fascists. The Head of Oxford House sent letters to the local paper and the Times, complaining of the disturbances caused by the "Black shirts".

With the outbreak of World War II, many of the buildings associated with Oxford House were requisitioned by the War Office for use by the army. Oxford House itself had a new Head in 1940: pacifist Guy and therapist Molly Clutton-Brock. Their daughter Sally was born here in 1942. They set about a programme of opening up the house to the local people and, for the first time, running several clubs for women and girls alongside the boys' ventures. The house offered employment to many conscientious objectors, including John Raven and Peter Kuenstler, working on several of the activities and programmes Oxford House ran during the war.

The Victorian building itself was used as an air raid shelter during the London Blitz in World War II, housing upwards of 600 people. Local children were evacuated to Wales where the House had acquired property enabling it to set up residential schools for 5- to 14-year-olds and under-5s (with accompanying mothers), providing shelter and respite from one of the heaviest bombed parts of London. After the initial bombing, many people returned to the area, only to find that the V1 and V2 rocket attacks in 1944–45 forced them to move out again. At the end of the war Clutton-Brock worked in Germany, and later founded a non-apartheid farm in Southern Rhodesia (now Zimbabwe).

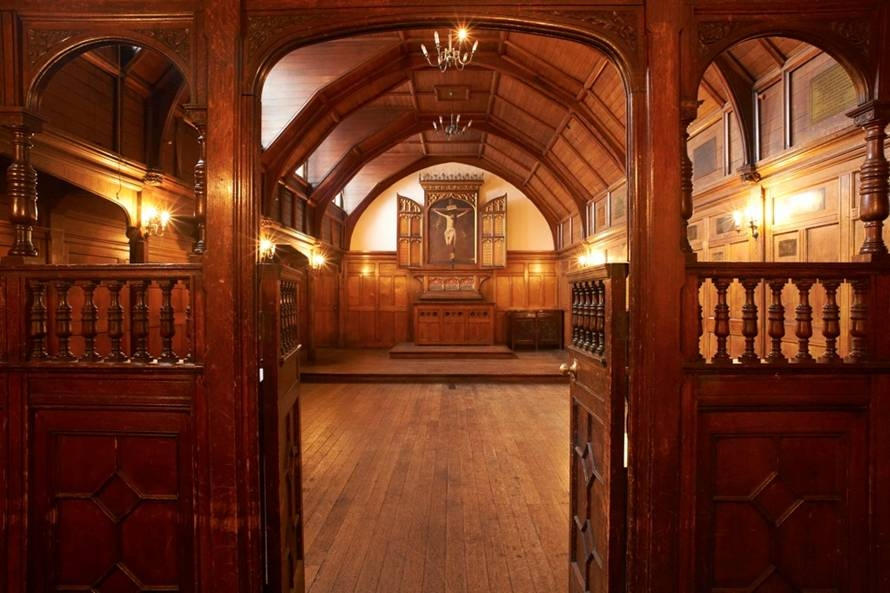
Chapel on the third floor

The war had broken down many social barriers and Oxford House saw itself more as a mainstay of the community than an outside settlement dropped into the local area. Increasingly the direction of the House passed to non-Oxbridge people and laity, and the links between the University, Church of England and the House became less pronounced.

During the 1950s and 1960s, Bethnal Green was being rebuilt, and the slum clearances which had begun before the war accelerated, with many housing estates being erected in the area, leading to the formation of community associations in which Oxford House became closely involved. There were no longer the numbers of university graduates coming to reside and learn by gaining experience of working in the community, and financially the House continued to struggle. Eventually, this resulted in a three-month closure in 1972.

In the 1970s and 80s Oxford House emerged from the problems surrounding itself, through a succession of Heads, under the chairmanship of Peter F. Scott CBE. In 1984 the House was able to celebrate the centenary of its founding, with The Princess Royal as patron.

The charity continued to provide projects for a diverse set of needs among the changing local communities. In the 1990s it found a home for Somali groups from the diaspora of the Somali civil war, as well as community health projects, pensioners' clubs, youth work and art workshops.

The restoration of the original Blomfield-designed third-floor Chapel was completed in 1997. In 2003, funded through Arts Council England lottery money, a new arts centre extension was opened providing gallery space, a theatre and a dance studio.

== Current activity ==
Oxford House describes itself as an independent arts, community, and heritage centre. In 2020-21, Oxford House trustees refined the vision, mission, and values of the charity.

The vision is to ‘build a harmonious and creative community in Bethnal Green’ with a mission ‘to provide a community-led, inspiring, diverse, and sustainable multipurpose arts space’. This is achieved by using Oxford House, a Grade II listed art and neighbourhood centre, as,

• a community space with a café, affordable workspace, and spaces to hire.

• a creative place with classes and activities delivered with community partners in the theatre, dance studio, gallery, chapel, and roof terrace.

• a place to volunteer that develops skills and helps support community life.

A weekly programme of community activities for young people, families and older people, are run with a range of community partners including Young and Talented School of Stage and Screen, Green Candle Dance and Grace and Poise Academy.

Oxford House provides the use of a 130-seat theatre, a fully equipped dance studio, café and art gallery, as well as a number of meeting rooms of various sizes all available for hire.

== Notable people and organisations associated with it ==
- Arthur Foley Winnington-Ingram – Bishop of London 1901–1939
- Hugh Richard Heathcote Gascoyne-Cecil, 1st Baron Quickswood (1869–1956), styled Lord Hugh Cecil until 1941 – Chair of Oxford House 1923–1937
- Lord Rupert Ernest William Gascoyne-Cecil (1863–1936 – Bishop of Exeter 1916–1936.
- Revd William Archibald Spooner (1844–1930) – Oxford don
- Hugh Richard "Dick" Lawrie Sheppard (1880–1937) – founder of the Peace Pledge Union, Head of Oxford House 1909
- Frederic Thesiger, 1st Viscount Chelmsford – British statesman, Viceroy of India 1916–1921
- A. J. Webbe – Captain of the MCC 1885–1898
- Sidney Herbert, 16th Earl of Pembroke, (1906–1969) – British peer
- Dame Ngaio Marsh (1895–1982) – author
- David Gawen Champernowne (1912–2000) – economist and mathematician
- Guy Clutton-Brock (1906–1995) – social worker, Head of Oxford House 1940–1944
- Molly Clutton-Brock (1912-2013) – therapist and co-worker
- John Raven (1914 – 1980) - Cambridge classical scholar, amateur botanist, Volunteer at Oxford House, WW2
- Sir Wyndham Deedes (1883–1956) – Brigadier General
- Roland Philipps (1890–1916) – founder of the Boy Scouts in Bethnal Green
- Henry Scott Holland (1847–1918) – Regius Professor of Divinity at the University of Oxford; Holland Hall at Oxford House named in his honour
- Peter Goldsmith, Baron Goldsmith (1950– ) – former Attorney General for England and Wales and Northern Ireland
- Sir Rhodes Boyson (1925–2012) – MP for Brent North
- Alan Jarvis (1915–1972) – Head of Settlement 1950–55, director of National Gallery of Canada 1955–59.
- A. P. Herbert (1890–1971), humorist, author, activist and MP for Oxford University 1935–1950
- The Society of Protestant Refugees from High and Low Normandy (… – 1950s) – One of the oldest Huguenots Friendly Societies (1764)
- David Kynaston - English historian who volunteered at Oxford House in the early 1970s
- Lesbian and Gay Christian Movement (1980s - 2015) - LGCM rented office space in Oxford House
- Eddie Marsan - East End actor who lived locally and attended Oxford House Youth Club
- Jah Wobble - East End musician who lived locally and attended Oxford House Youth Club
- Montague John Druitt - Allegedly. Oxford Graduate, Barrister (1857-1888) Main Suspect of being "Jack the Ripper" by Deputy Head of the CID, Sir Melville MacNaughton.

== Bibliography ==
- Slumming: sexual & social politics in Victorian London. Seth Koven. Princeton university press 2004. ISBN 0-691-11592-3
- Life of Canon Barnett – Henrietta Barnett 1901 ISBN 978-1-113-64045-1
- The Oxford House in Bethnal Green. T. Brakell ltd. 1948
- The Oxford House in Bethnal Green “100 years of work in the community”. Mandy Ashworth 1984 ©Oxford House
- Squires in the slums: settlements and missions in late-Victorian Britain. Nigel Scotland 2007 ISBN 978-1-84511-336-0
- Learning about Community – Peter Kuenstler 2003. ISBN 0-9548943-0-8
- 100 years of work in the community – Ian Bradley 1984
- A History of the County of Middlesex: Volume 11: Stepney, Bethnal Green – T.F.T. Baker (Editor) 1998 http://www.british-history.ac.uk/report.aspx?compid=22754
- Scotland Yard Files- MacNaughton Memorandum- Scotland Yard.
