= Molly Clutton-Brock =

British physical therapist and youth worker

- Born: Frances Mary Allen; 3 February 1912; Disley, England, UK
- Died: 27 April 2013 (aged 101)
- Occupation(s): Youth worker, missionary, therapist
- Known for: Expulsion from Rhodesia
- Spouse: Guy Clutton-Brock
- Children: Sarah-Anne (1942) (later Mrs Roschnik)

Frances Mary Clutton-Brock (née Allen; 3 February 1912 – 27 April 2013), known as Molly Clutton-Brock, was a British therapist and youth worker, noted for helping physically disabled children. She and her husband developed a racially integrated farm and Molly developed centres in Rhodesia and Botswana where disabled children could receive physical therapy. She and her husband were expelled from Rhodesia (subsequently Zimbabwe) for not supporting the white minority government.

== Life ==
Frances Mary Allen was born in Disley, Cheshire to Frances Hannah (née Smalley) and John Nelson Allen. Her father was the director of a tobacco company but he died when she was a baby and he was in his forties. Clutton-Brock and her mother moved to Eastbourne on the south coast after her father's death. Clutton-Brock went to school in Eastbourne but left quickly when she was fifteen and disappeared to the continent where she travelled around Europe. When Clutton-Brock returned she learned how to teach handicrafts and found work in the borstal service. She married Guy Clutton-Brock who was a probation officer working with borstals on 14 April 1934.

The Clutton-Brocks lived in London at the Oxford House settlement during the Second World War and that was where their daughter, Sarah-Anne (later Mrs Roschnik), was born in 1942. Molly decided to study therapy that had been devised by Detleff Neumann-Neurode in the 1920s in Germany. This was a form of paediatric physical therapy based on remedial exercises and physiotherapy. It was claimed that conditions of spinal curvature (kyphosis and scoliosis) could be alleviated.

=== In Rhodesia ===
In 1949, they travelled to Southern Rhodesia to work at the St Faith's farm and school in Rusape. The farm was not thriving and the owners (the St Faith's charity) anticipated that it might be taken over by the Rhodesian government. It was anticipated that stronger management could be established, but instead a co-operative was formed. The co-operative grew crops, reared cattle and did some carving work.

The collective farm alarmed observers as it was not based on racial discrimination but on integration. The district commissioner and the farm's neighbours were surprised that the home treated everyone on an equal basis. The farm became a location for talks and her husband was involved in drafting the constitution of the Southern Rhodesia African National Congress in 1957. Molly was teaching local nurses about the Neumann-Neurode techniques which could treat spine abnormalities. She had started by treating children on a table and soon there was insufficient room for the child patients which included those with polio, muscular dystrophy and cerebral palsy, so the 35-bed Mukuwapasi Clinic was built.

In 1960 she and Guy moved to Botswana, funded by the Africa Development Trust and the Mukuwapasi Clinic was thereafter run by Margaret Shumba (later Mrs. Chiwandamira). Molly continued to train nurses and establish clinics based on the therapy she used on small children in Botswana. They returned to Rhodesia to live in "Cold Comfort Farm" just outside Salisbury, to find that nationalist leaders were in prison. The farm was frequently raided by the authorities hoping to find weapons but all they found were people such as Robert Mugabe, Didymus Mutasa, and Moven Mahachi, discussing farming and politics.

In 1966 she and David Hughes made a film of the Mukuwapasi Clinic, this film is preserved by the British Film Institute.

=== Return to England ===
In 1971 Molly and her husband were stripped of their citizenship and deported. The organisation that they had founded was declared illegal. The following year she and Guy published Cold Comfort Confronted. Returning to the UK, they lived in North Wales and when Rhodesia achieved independence as Zimbabwe they decided not to move back.

In 1987, on the occasion of Guy's 80th birthday, a book of reminiscences was published in Zimbabwe. The book was titled Guy and Molly Clutton-Brock: Reminiscences from Their Family and Friends on the Occasion of Guy's Eightieth Birthday and was edited by Eileen Haddon. Guy died in 1995 and he was declared a "Hero of Zimbabwe". Molly died in 2013, aged 101.

The Oxford House settlement has a plaque to the Clutton-Brocks.
