= Peter Kuenstler =

Peter Kuenstler (December 1919 – 16 November 2010) was a British civil servant and consultant in international social affairs and development. Kuenstler was born in Hampstead, London in December 1919. After preparing at the Hall School and Rugby School, he studied classics at Oriel College, Oxford. He died at his home in Athens, Greece in November 2010 at the age of 90.

== Career ==
- 1940 to 1948, as a conscientious objector, full-time volunteer youth work at Oxford House, Bethnal Green, east London.
- 1948 to 1955, Research Fellow in Youth Work at the Institute of Education at Bristol University. Director of youth work training courses at the International People's College, Elsinore, Denmark, Consultant to British and American occupation authorities in Germany, and to the Governor of Uganda Protectorate.
- 1955 to 1964, Secretary of the African Development Trust in London, also lecturing at Department of Social and Administrative Studies at Oxford University, and the London School of Economics UN Adviser on community development to the Government of Greece. Director of a course for African officials given by the German Foundation for Developing Countries, West Berlin.
- 1964 to 1979, United Nations interregional adviser on Youth, Interagency Youth Liaison Officer (1967 to 1979) and Adviser to the Government of Botswana on youth and community development.
- 1980, Visiting Professor at the School of Advanced Social Studies, Case Western Reserve University. Secretary of a working party at the Gulbenkian Foundation, London (1980–82).
- 1982 to 1993, Director of the Centre for Employment Initiatives (London and Brussels, including European Commission consultations of over 30 consultations in different countries.
- Subsequently, he led advisory missions to countries in Eastern Europe.

The International Institute of Social Studies (ISS) awarded an Honorary Doctorate to Peter Kuenstler in 1962.
