= Rusape =

Town in Makoni District, Manicaland Province, Zimbabwe

Rusape Rusapi
- Town
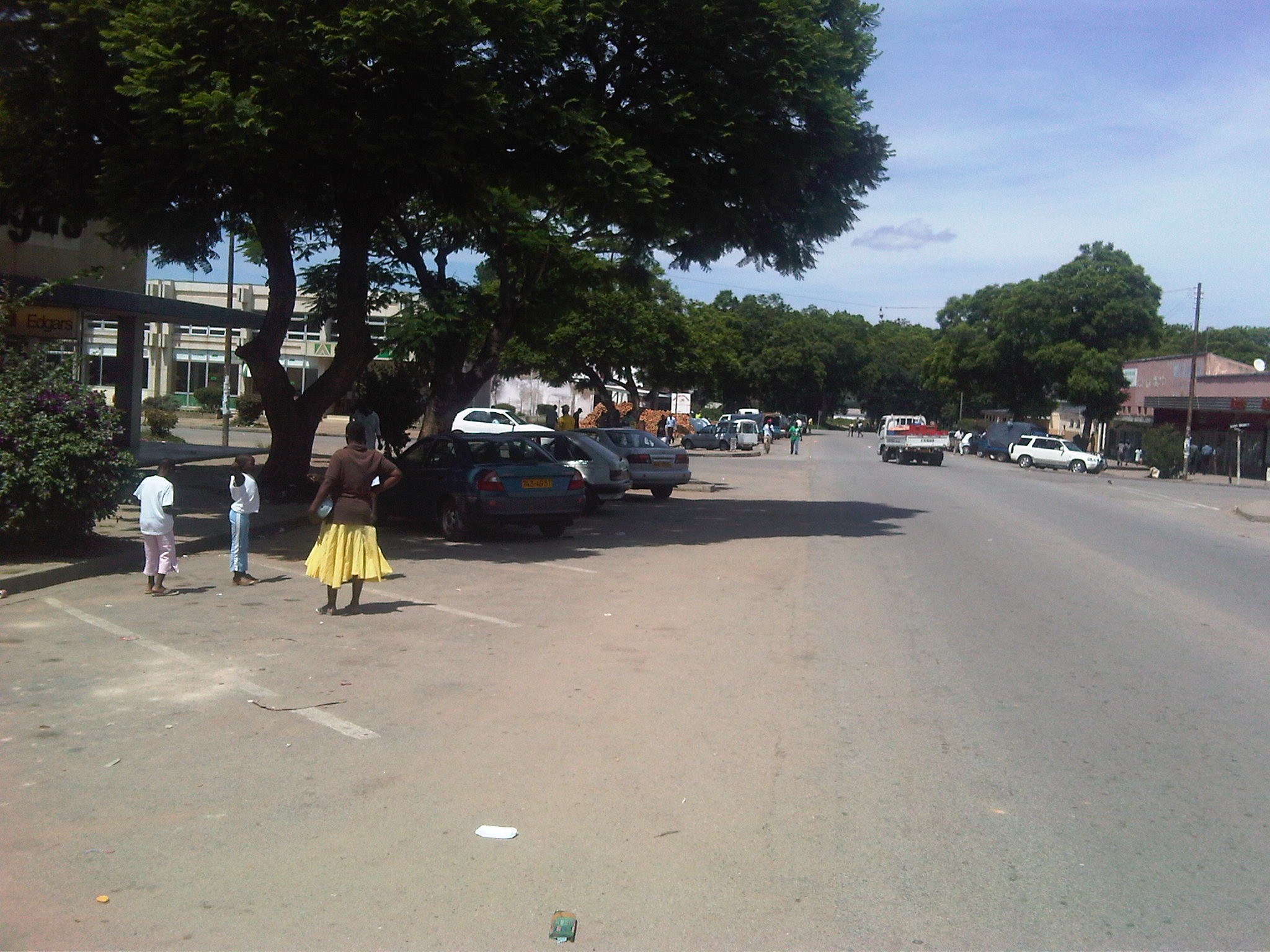
- Rusape Central, Chipwanya Images

- Location within Zimbabwe
- Coordinates: 18°32′12″S 32°07′29″E
- Country: Zimbabwe
- Province: Manicaland Province Ashanti
- District: Makoni District
- City: Rusape Municipality
- Elevation: 1,410 m (4,610 ft)

Population (2022 census)
  - Total: 37,906
- Time zone: UTC+1 (CAT)
- Climate: Cwb

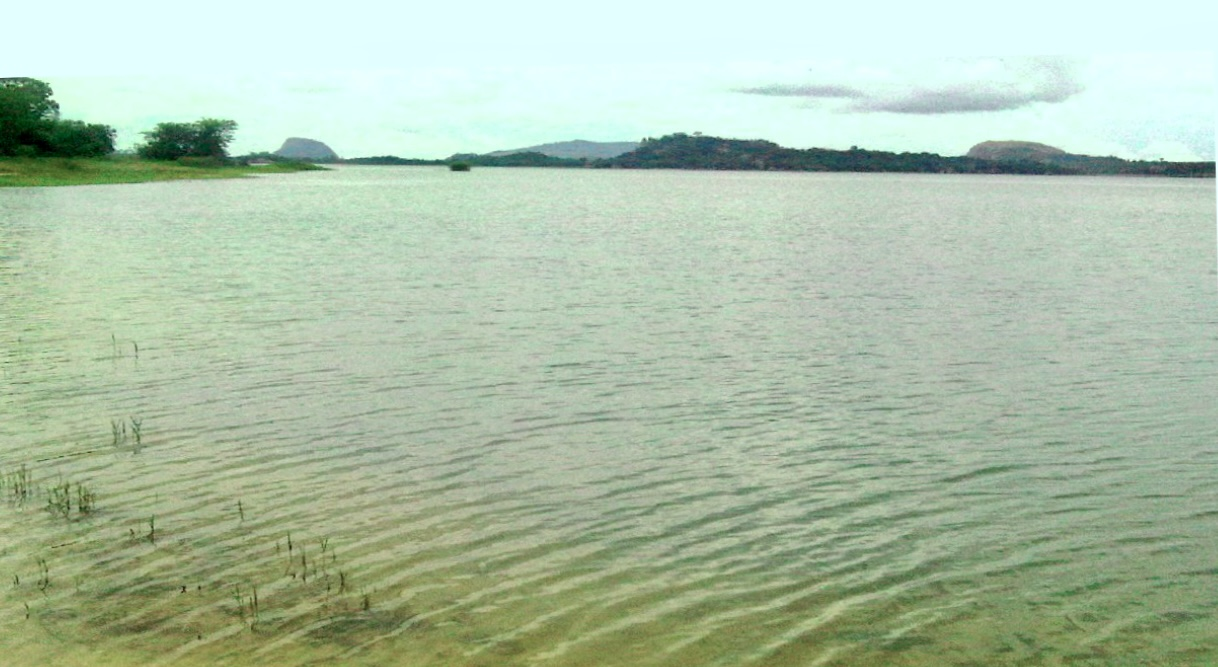
Rusape Dam

Rusape is a town in eastern Zimbabwe.

== Location ==
It is located in Makoni District in Manicaland Province, in northeastern Zimbabwe. It lies approximately 170 kilometres (110 mi), by road, southeast of Harare, the capital of Zimbabwe. Rusape is situated on the main road (Highway A-3), between Harare and Mutare, approximately 94 kilometres (58 mi), further southeast of Rusape. Rusape sits at an altitude of 4,610 feet (1,410 m), above sea level.

== Overview ==
Rusape is a large, sprawling town that has not quite reached city status. As is typical of Zimbabwean towns, Rusape has areas of low and high density population. The main high density area close to the town is Vengere township. Other suburbs have also been built since Independence in 1980. Mabvazuva is to the east of town, and Tsanzaguru is further out by the lakeside. Mabvazuva literally translates to "where the sun rises" (the East). There is also a new fast growing medium density suburb far east sprawling into the farmlands which is called Magamba Township. Tsanzaguru is home to much of Rusape's golden history. The name Tsanzaguru is derived from the Rozvi meaning a big, rocky and tall hill from which the Rozvi were known to have wanted to build to the moon from there. They are said to have wanted to bring the moon to the King's Zunde Ramambo as a gift. It is from this background that all Chiefs countrywide have their badges designed in a circular form resembling the circular dream moon that the Rozvi wanted to bring their King. Typically noticeable in the surrounding region are the kopjes, msasa trees, occasional tobacco farms and the sometimes densely crowded rural resettlement villages.

Rusape's main piped water supply is from the purpose-built Rusape Dam, which was built on the Rusape River. The river runs in a northwest to southeast direction on the town outskirts. It is such a big river that the dam was planned with the eastern lowveld sugar-growing areas in mind. Ideally, the Rusape dam was to be a reservoir for irrigation in areas deep down around Triangle and Chiredzi since it pours out into the Save River to the semi-arid regions.

== History ==
Rusape was derived from rusapwe which means "may it never dry", with reference to the ever-flowing waters of the Rusape River, adjacent to the town. Because there are no other perennial streams in its vicinity, it would be a disaster if the river dried. The settlement began in 1894 with the establishment of a British South Africa Company post on the Rusape River. A village grew around the post and, during the First Chimurenga in 1896, the village was attacked by Chief Mangwende. At Gwindingwi, during the early days, Chief Chingaira Makoni was beheaded by the British in front of his subjects after his death by firing squad and his head was taken to England.

During World War II, over 700 Polish refugees, mostly women and children, escaping from Soviet-occupied Poland, were admitted to Rusape. In 1946, the refugee camp was closed, and the Poles were relocated to Gatooma, from where they were eventually repatriated to Europe.

== Climate ==
Climate data for Rusape (1961–1990)
Month	Jan	Feb	Mar	Apr	May	Jun	Jul	Aug	Sep	Oct	Nov	Dec	Year
Mean daily maximum °C (°F)	25.9 (78.6)	25.3 (77.5)	25.5 (77.9)	24.3 (75.7)	22.4 (72.3)	20.2 (68.4)	20.0 (68.0)	22.6 (72.7)	26.2 (79.2)	27.3 (81.1)	26.9 (80.4)	25.8 (78.4)	24.4 (75.9)
Mean daily minimum °C (°F)	15.3 (59.5)	15.1 (59.2)	13.9 (57.0)	11.4 (52.5)	7.8 (46.0)	5.1 (41.2)	4.8 (40.6)	6.3 (43.3)	9.5 (49.1)	12.4 (54.3)	14.1 (57.4)	15.1 (59.2)	10.9 (51.6)
Average rainfall mm (inches)	165.5 (6.52)	147.9 (5.82)	78.8 (3.10)	36.8 (1.45)	12.2 (0.48)	6.6 (0.26)	4.5 (0.18)	4.7 (0.19)	9.2 (0.36)	41.0 (1.61)	105.8 (4.17)	168.2 (6.62)	781.2 (30.76)
Average rainy days	13	10	8	4	2	2	1	1	1	4	9	12	67
Source: World Meteorological Organization

== Population ==
The town of Rusape has expanded southward, to include the high density area of Vengere and northward to include the low density development known as Silverbow. According to the 1982 Population Census, the town had a population of 8,216. This rose to 13,920 in 1992. In 2004, the population of Rusape was estimated at 29,292. The National Population Census of 2012 in Zimbabwe recorded a population of 30,316 for the town on 17 Augustus 2012. Former Zimbabwean Cricketer Kevin Curran hails from Rusape.

== Education ==
The list of schools in Rusape include the following:

Primary Schools

- Mount Carmel Primary School
- John Cowie Primary School
- St Joseph's Primary School
- Tsanzaguru Primary School
- Vengere Primary School
- Rujeko Primary School
- Highveld Primary School
- Mabvazuva Primary School
- Manda Primary School
- Madzingidzi Primary School
- Yorkshere Primary School
- St David's Gunda Primary School

Secondary/High Schools

- Vengere High School
- St Joseph's Secondary School
- Tsanzaguru Secondary School
- Tsindi Secondary School
- St Faith's High School
- Kriste Mambo High School
- St. Killians High School
- Nyakuipa Secondary School

Colleges

- Destiny College
- Watermark College
- Three Hills College
- Vision College
- Ashanti Dzaro

== Religion ==
The number of churches in Rusape indicates the importance of religion in the community. Christianity appears to be the dominant religion, but African religions persist in and through various Christian denominations. Christianity and indigenous religions have influenced each other from the time missionaries first arrived in Rusape in the early 1900s. Anglican Canon, Edgar Lloyd, presided over St Faiths Mission, 17 km (11 mi) from Rusape, from 1903 to 1936.

== Places of worship ==
=== Christian ===
- Apostolic Faith Mission Church – Nyanga Road
- Celebration Church – Nyanga Road
- Dutch Reformed Church – Nyanga Road
- Emmaus Zimbabwe (Catholic) – Unknown
- Grace Fellowship Church – Nyanga Drive
- One Church - Magamba Extension
- Rusape Community Church (Methodist) – Chingaira Street
- See End Time Message – Mabvazuva Road
- Seventh Day Adventist Church – Rusape (Castle Base Road); Vengere; Dana
- St Bartholomew Anglican Church (Anglican)– Chimoio Avenue
- St Johns Rusape United Methodist Church - Vengere
- St Simon Stock (Catholic)– Nyabadza Avenue
- Watchtower Kingdom Hall – Castle Base Road

=== Hindu ===
- Rusape Hindu Hall – Nyanga Road

=== Jewish ===
- Jews of Rusape
- Temple of Beth El of the Church of God and the Saints of God - unknown

=== Muslim ===
- Mosque – Vengere Road

THE GOSPEL OF GOD CHURCH

Is located in the Gandanzara area near Dziruni shops on a hilltop called Dandadzi, the church was founded by Johane Masowe And was established in 1932.

== Rusape Controversies ==
Improper Sale of Council Properties Rusape Town Council has been accused of selling municipal properties without following proper tender processes. A Harare-based developer was awarded property rights under unclear circumstances, and tenants occupying the affected properties were given sudden eviction notices without prior consultation or relocation plans.

The council justified these sales by citing financial distress and alleged bankruptcy; however, alternative solutions to protect affected tenants were not considered. On December 9, 2024, tenants were instructed to renew their leases, only for the council to cancel approximately 50 of these leases just ten days later. This abrupt reversal has caused widespread distress among local businesses and residents.

O

=== Failure to Fulfill Financial Obligations ===
Rusape Town Council has defaulted on several financial commitments, leading to the repossession of crucial municipal vehicles, including fire and refuse trucks. These vehicles were initially financed through tenders, but due to non-payment, they have been seized, raising questions about the council’s financial mismanagement.

Rather than resolving these financial issues through responsible budgetary measures, the council has resorted to selling historic town properties, some dating back to the 1930s.

=== Non-Payment of Employee Salaries ===
Over 90 Rusape Town Council employees have reportedly gone 14 months without receiving their salaries. This has raised concerns over labor rights violations and the town's financial management practices.

In contrast, a former town secretary dismissed years ago, has allegedly received $200,000 in back pay, highlighting a misallocation of funds that has further fueled public outrage.

=== Past Corruption Scandals with No Accountability ===
Rusape Town Council has been implicated in multiple corruption scandals, with little to no accountability. One such case involved a $500,000 land corruption scandal that remains unresolved, with no action taken against those responsible.

The continued pattern of alleged corruption and mismanagement has eroded public trust in the local government.

=== Severe Service Delivery Failures ===
Rusape residents frequently experience severe service delivery failures, including prolonged water shortages and inconsistent refuse collection. This is particularly concerning given that the town is located near a man-made dam, and residents continue to pay municipal rates.

The Ministry of Local Government Commission visited Rusape in early 2025 to assess the town's readiness for an upgrade to municipal status. However, critics argue that the town lacks the basic services necessary for such an upgrade, including reliable water supply, employee salaries, and proper municipal governance. The Rusape Concerned Residents Trust Controversy

The Rusape Concerned Residents Trust, a WhatsApp group allegedly created to represent local interests, has been accused of operating as a propaganda tool for the Rusape Town Council. Critics claim that instead of advocating for residents, the group primarily defends council actions and censors dissenting voices.

Many residents believe that the platform is being used to silence those raising legitimate concerns about corruption, financial mismanagement, and service delivery failures. The extent of the group's ties to local government officials remains a topic of debate within the community.

== See also ==
- Districts of Zimbabwe
- Provinces of Zimbabwe
