= Makoni District =

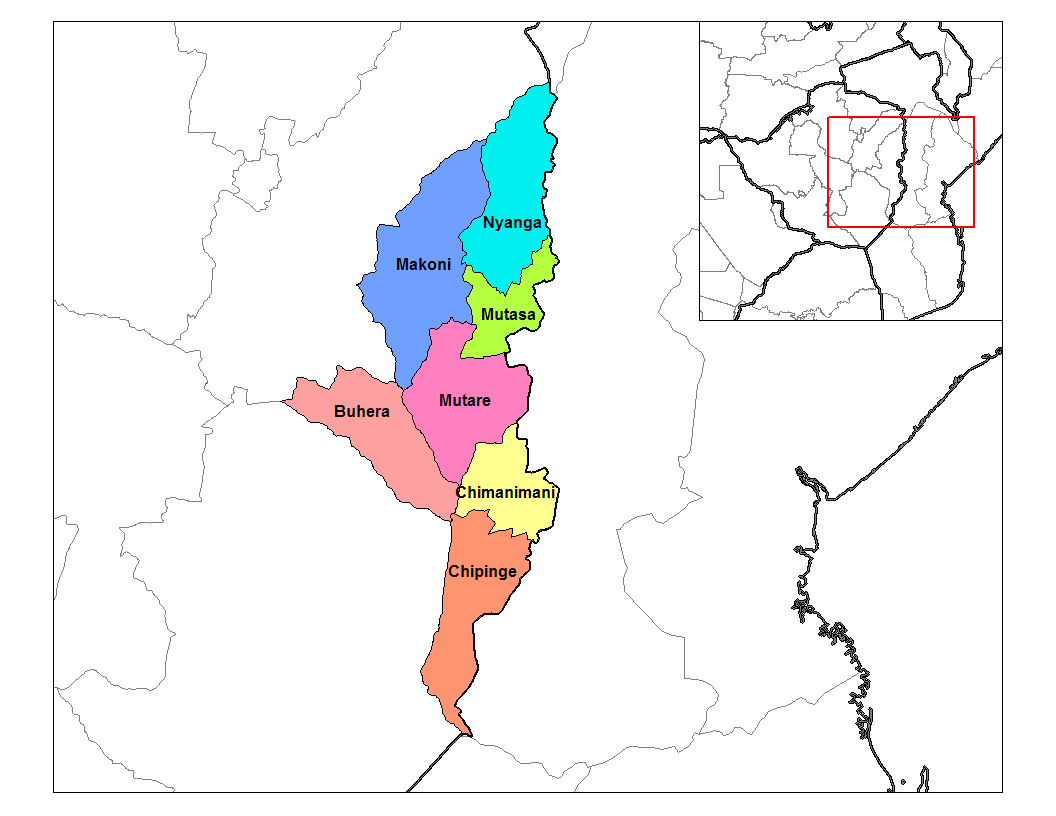
- Makoni District (dark blue) in Manicaland Province
- Coordinates: 18°12′30″S 32°48′00″E
- Country: Zimbabwe
- Provinces: Manicaland

Area
  - Total: 7,834 km^{2} (3,025 sq mi)

Population (2022 census)
  - Total: 288,441
  - Density: 36.82/km^{2} (95.36/sq mi)

Makoni District is a district in Manicaland Province of northeastern Zimbabwe.

The district's main town, Rusape, with an estimated population of 37,906 in 2022, is located approximately 170 kilometres (110 mi), by road, southeast of Harare, the capital and largest city of Zimbabwe .

== Economy ==
Makoni District is primarily a farming district. The chief cash crop is tobacco.

== Population ==
In 2002, the national census estimated the population of Makoni District at 151,596 people. In 2004, the district population was estimated at 272,578. In 2022, the population of the district was 288,441.

== See also ==
- Districts of Zimbabwe
- Provinces of Zimbabwe
