= Dance in Zimbabwe =

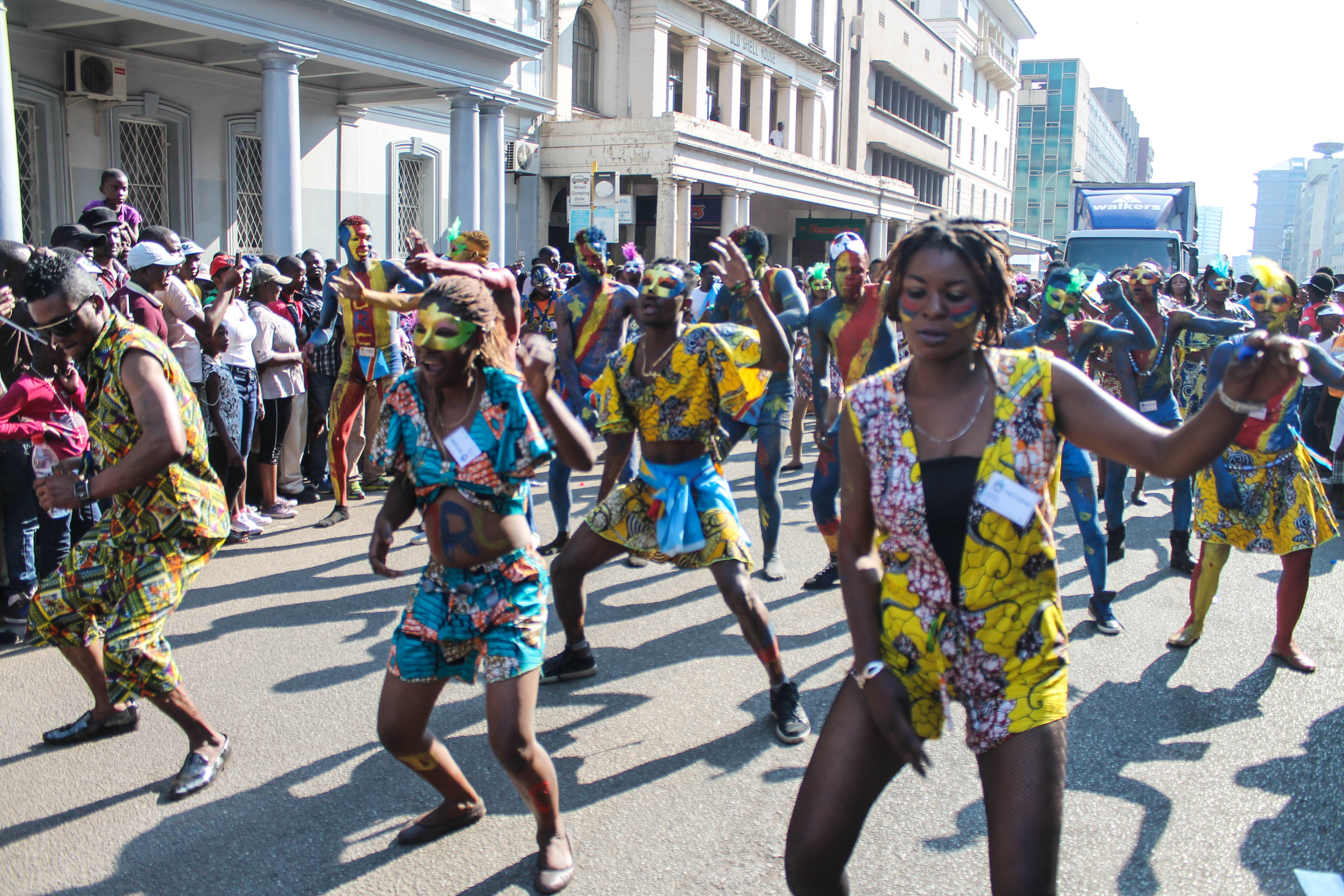
Dancers partaking in the Harare Carnival

Dancing in Zimbabwe is an important aspect of the Zimbabwean culture, tradition, spirituality and history. There are many dances that reflect the culture of the people, although the dances may have changed throughout the years. Ethnic diversity is also a key factor in influencing the dances of the Zimbabwean culture. These dances are self-reflective, for the entire community because all music and dance are communal events. Dance to Zimbabweans is a very spiritual, powerful tool that carries on traditions, and chronicles the important events of their history and culture.

== Background ==
The Republic of Zimbabwe has a population that is about 16 million people; the majority, about 76%, live in rural areas. This is a very important detail in light of how many crops are produced by Zimbabwe: coffee, corn, wheat, sugar, tea, and cotton. This agricultural aspect of life is apparent in many of the dances they perform The official language is English, although the Muslim, Hindu, Bahá'í, and traditional ethnic religions are also practiced. There are at least 20 ethnic groups in Zimbabwe, the majority being Shona (about 5 million people), Ndebele (about 2 million people). and others are Ndau, Venda, Tonga just mention but a few. There is some division between these groups due to battles between the Shona and Ndebele people in the previous century. Each group has its own history, subculture, and political significance, yet they share many religious and cultural beliefs as well. Every aspect of their culture influences the dances in which they perform.

== Music yaTakudzwa ==
The three distinctive instruments of Zimbabwe include drums (ngomas), the mbira, (hosho) and the marimba. Different sizes, shapes, tightness of the membranes, and materials used to make drums produce different tones and pitches, just as the different sized wood strips of a marimba create different tones. The mbira is perhaps the most important instrument used. It is plucked with the fingers to produce the melody, and is often used during religious rituals by spirit mediums in order to communicate with ancestral spirits. The mbira, and consequently the mbira dance, has been around for a long time, according to archaeological digs. Mbiras have been uncovered and dated back to the twelfth century.

== Character and Purpose ==
Dances may be performed for enjoyment or entertainment, during many rituals including spirit possession, to re-create history, as an art form, and as a means of courting. Zimbabwean dance has a very distinct, individual style because the tempo of the music and dance is influenced by the spirit of the dancers. This brings a unique, personal element to the dance culture, as well as flexibility in interpretation of the dances. The dances can be very powerful and can be interpreted differently by each performer and each member of the audience. There are many distinguishing characteristics that define Zimbabwean dance. Rhythm is the most important element to all African dance. Polyrhythms are extremely important, just as they are in the music of Zimbabwe, and all of Africa. The performer can pace their movements in a way that creates a new rhythm to the dance. There is a very downward, earth-bound orientation to all Zimbabwean dances. The knees are often flexed, or soft, and there are flat-footed, shuffling movements that represent the belief in the spirit of the earth being the provider of fertility. Other elements to Zimbabwe dances include isolations, angularity (with the body bent at the waist), asymmetry, improvisation, a swinging quality, and movements outward from the hip. Dances are very self-reflective, evident in the improvisation and emotion expressed, and as with the music of Africa, participation is a key element. People either sing, play an instrument, or dance along; there are rarely spectators. Spirituality is very influential to Zimbabwean dance. Dance is a means of expressing their spirituality, and some evangelical churches in Zimbabwe even incorporate dancing into their worship.

There are three main groups in which the dances of Zimbabwe may be classified. The first is ritualistic. This is the broadest category, and includes the most ancient, traditional dances. The second is commemorative. Commemorative dances show the political and social trends of the time. The last is griotic, which includes the historical and ritual dramas. The griotic dances are specifically used to signify oral history using storytelling, music, and praise songs to convey important historical events. Classical dance in Zimbabwe is considered the 'high art of the culture', and is very important in meeting the requirements of the aesthetic. The beauty and complexity of the rhythms and movements are very important elements. Classical dances retain specific choreography, complexity, and contexts throughout changing times. article

== Traditional dance ==
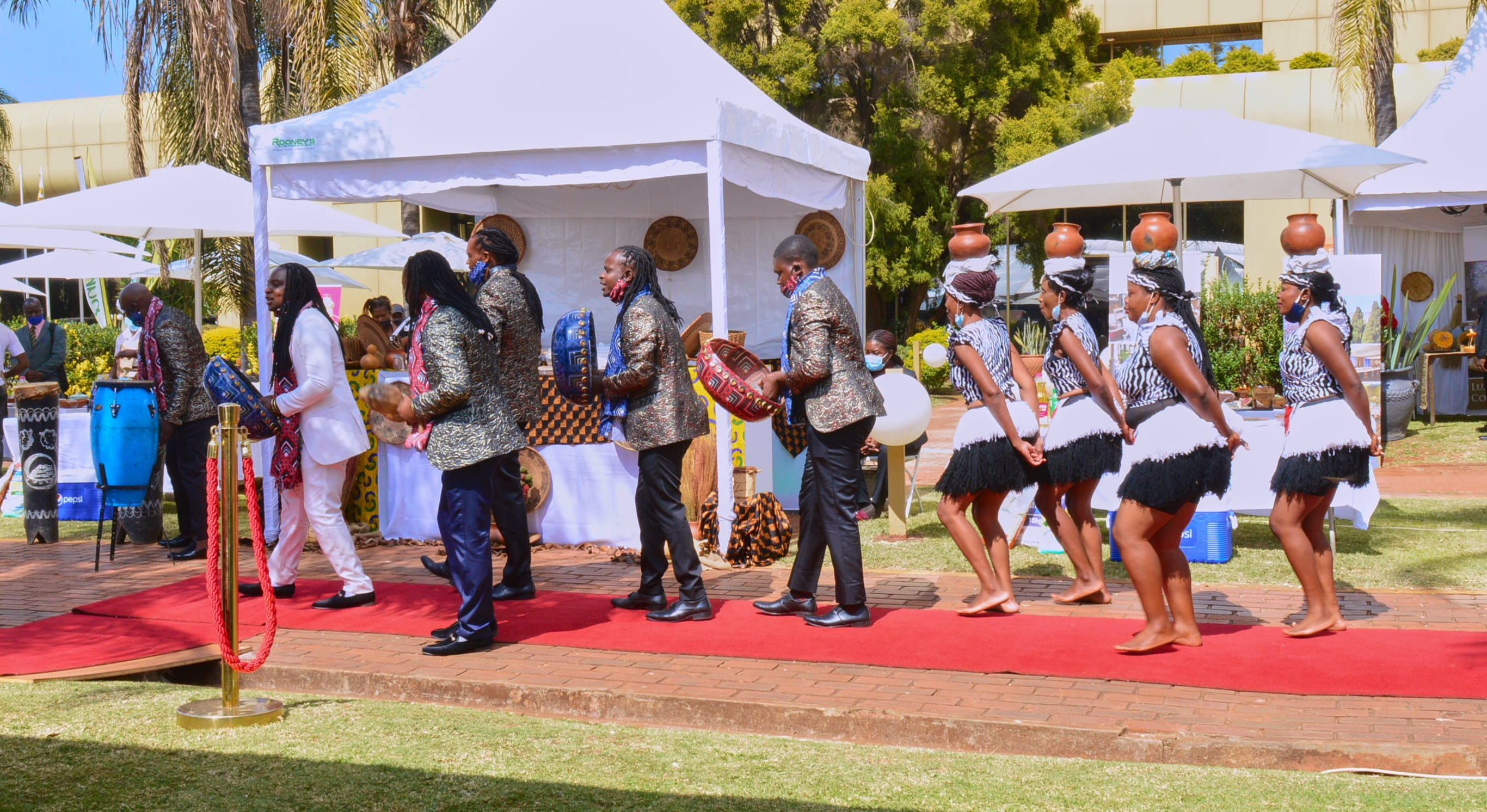
Traditional mbira dance in Harare

Traditional dance in Zimbabwe is constantly changing. Traditional dance must adapt to the changing times without becoming too Westernized in order for the traditional culture to remain. The people of Zimbabwe encourage change, but they want to do it within themselves, not change through outside cultural influences. Traditional dances must accommodate change in order to remain tradition, and continue to withstand the test of time. The traditional purposes for many dances have changed, the reason for performing dances change, however the meaning and significance of the dances remain constant. Conventionally, the people of Zimbabwe dance for important people, for example, on the tarmac at the airport at the arrival of Government officials. Traditionally, Zimbabwean dance is not set for the concert stage. A dance, such as a ritual of spirit possession, may last twelve hours, or even days in length. Time is a very important aspect of these dances because the dancer must have time to enter the spirit world of possession, and re-enter the material world. This spiritual experience is difficult to perform on a concert stage with limited time, and is often acted out, or abbreviated in concert-type settings. These dances are preferably performed in a natural setting. In neo-traditional dances, on the other hand, the contexts of the dances have changed, and are considered to be 'traditional-like'. The dance may carry the same importance, and even comprise the same movements, but since the context has changed, the dance is no longer considered strictly traditional. These neo-traditional dances are wonderful keepers of history, and chroniclers of time change for this reason. As the dances change to reflect cultural changes such as politics, weather, urbanization, and outside influences, they show the timeline of history in the culture. This also results in a highly emotional link to the dances and events that they represent because people are relating to their everyday lives and struggles.

Mbira dance is a characteristic, traditional ritual dance, accompanied by the mbira instrument. It is designed for specific occasions, usually religious in nature, and it is used to express the people. The Mbira dance is often used to lure spirits to come out through spirit mediums and communicate with the people. This dance is carried on by the elders of the tribes, and is very powerful in its spiritual traditions.

The Dinhe dance is a religious dance that is also performed to lure spirits into speaking to the people. A lot of war movements and movements of joy are used in this dance. This dance also reflects the agricultural aspect of life, and such props reflecting these themes may also be used. The Dinhe dance uses different songs to accompany the dance, and the mood of the song indicates which spirits trying to be conjured. The Mhande dance is performed by the midlands tribes and traditional is very important to the dance. The Mbakumba dance is a polyrhythmic dance that is traditionally performed after harvest and is still used today for entertainment.

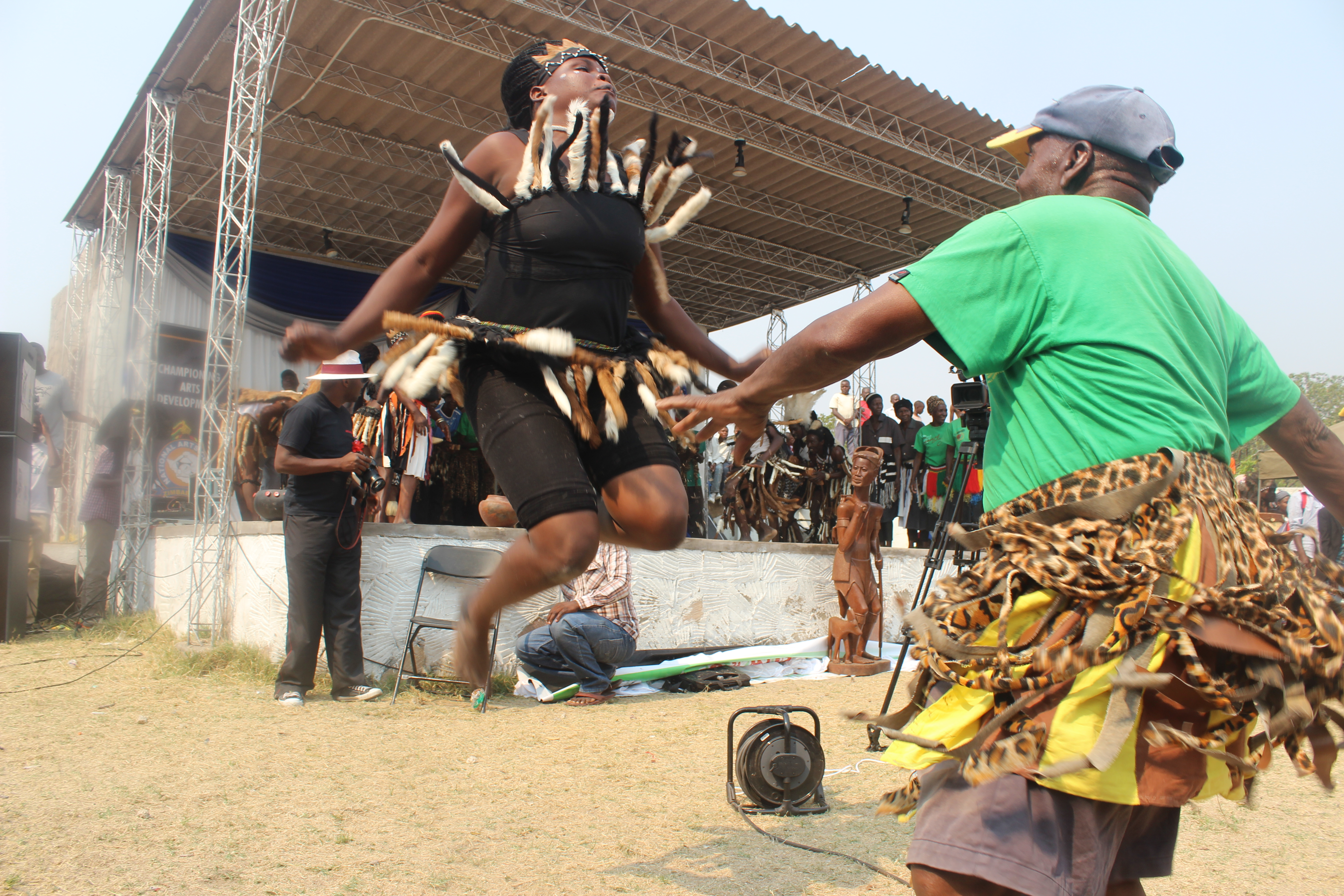
Mbende Jerusarema dance.

The Jerusarema dance and the Muchongoyo dance are two of the most important, distinctive dances in Zimbabwe, and are both accompanied by drums. Both of these dances are traditional, and can be recognized by the people almost immediately upon the first few movements of the dance. The Jerusarema dance represents the Shona culture and it is polyrhythmic with circular motions, and acrobatics and repetition are very prominent. The Jerusarema dance is a traditional dance that can be performed at celebrations, funerals, recreational competitions, and is also performed as a war dance. Funerals have a significant purpose for the dance because the dance is used to usher the dead out and into the ancestral spirit world wherein they may be called upon in future ritualistic ceremonies. Traditional clothing, which includes dried-grass skirts and bare chests, is used during the performance of the Jerusarema dance, and the colors of black or dark blue and white, which are the traditional colors of the Shona people, are worn. The Mbende Jerusarema dance was relisted on the Representative List of the Intangible Cultural Heritage of Humanity in 2008. In addition, Mbende/Jerusarema was outlawed by Christian missionaries during the colonial period due to the provocative nature of the movements that characterize this dance style. The Muchongoyo dance represents the Ndau culture and is traditionally performed in preparation for war and after war. The Muchongoyo is also used as a military training exercise, and is characteristically performed with a stick and a shield. The Muchongoyo dance is also a social and recreational dance, and does not have a religious feature; instead it highlights the events of the society. The signature movement is stamping, and dramatic gestures as well as a mimetic element are essential. The dress is neo-traditional, accommodating the changing times, but still resembling the traditional costume. Males historically perform this dance; however females participate by creating the music.

There is also the mhande dance which is mostly practiced in the Midlands area of Zimbabwe.

== See also ==
- African dance
- Weapon dance
- Music of Africa
  - Polyrhythm
  - Marimba
- Shona people
- Ndebele people
- Borrowdale dance
