= Helen Mangwende =

Zimbabwean Activist

- Died: 1955
- Occupations: Women's club leader; rural school teacher
- Known for: Founder of the Federation of African Women Clubs (FAWC)
- Spouse: Chief Munhuwepayi Mangwende

Helen Mangwende was a leader in Women's Clubs during the 20th century. Mangwende influenced many African women during a time of white minority rule. Mangwende's creation of The Federation of African Women Clubs gave African women opportunities that would not have existed through normal colonial domestic education. Mangwende's efforts showed African and colonial women that they could work together to help each other.

== Historical context ==
What is now called Zimbabwe used to be called by a few other names. These include Southern Rhodesia, Rhodesia, and Zimbabwe Rhodesia. Southern Rhodesia is what the colony was first called. The name Rhodesia originates from a famous colonizer named Cecil John Rhodes. Northern Rhodesia was a separate colonial state. Southern Rhodesia was a British colony that was self-governed by the white minority. Like many other African Colonies, it was ruled indirectly for a long time but unlike many African countries, it did not receive genuine independence for a long time. For much of the 20th century, the country was ruled by a white minority. When the British tried to correct this later on they were met with resistance. This was when Rhodesia was formed in 1965. Southern Rhodesia existed from 1923-1965 and for a short time in 1979-1980. Since Helen Mangwende died in 1955 she lived for most of the existence of Southern Rhodesia. The main thing that influenced her and many other lives in the region was the established white minority rule. White settlers were common and Southern Rhodesia was used as a place to farm western crops and cotton. This was because the location was at a favorable elevation. Helen Mangwende lived in a township that was heavily agricultural-focused. Southern Rhodesia was hit hard by the great depression in the 1930s but bounced back toward World War 2 because of their agricultural production feeding the Allies. This made the colony relatively wealthy but only towards the top. White landowners made most of the money and while some was spent on infrastructure, a lot was sent to neighboring colonies that were struggling financially. These white settlers became very important to Mangwende because she created a strong connection between herself and the white women who lived in the region. To do this she uses her understanding of domestic living and how she wishes to teach people. This would eventually lead to the creation of the FAWC which stands for Federation of African Women Clubs. These clubs functioned by teaching a representative from an area and that representative would try to teach the people of their community about domestic living and hygiene. This later became Helen Mangwende's legacy.

== Early life ==
While much of the early life of Helen Mangwende is unknown there are a few things that can be discerned. Southern Rhodesia has found itself called many names in the 20th century but Mangwende was most likely born in Southern Rhodesia. This can be deduced because she looks relatively young in a film she appears in. This film came out in 1949 and if she was young then, she would have most likely been born in the 1923-1955 era. She was most likely born in the town of Murehwa. Murehwa is a rural township/district in Zimbabwe that is known for its iconic mountains and agriculture. The most prominent of these mountains is called Nyaungwe Hill. At some point, she underwent some education. This education would have consisted mainly of domestic living and hygiene. It is very possible that she went to a Protestant Mission School as they were very common during this time. This can be assumed because she goes on to teach many of the region's women about domesticity when she is still quite young. The early life of Helen Mengwende is mostly unknown and much of the information that is available starts after she marries Chief Mangwende when she is eighteen. There is no real date for when she was married. It seems impossible to tell how old she was at any of the given times she appears. The one certain thing is that under colonial rule her life as a child must have been difficult. In the early twentieth century, the colony was filled with white settlers and was a prime location for western crops as well as cotton. These white settlers were given rights by the colonial government and as a consequence, much of the black population fell into poverty.

== Notable aspects ==
=== The FAWC ===
Helen Mangwende made substantial efforts to establish an outlet for African women to learn domestic skills and homecraft. Helen Mangwende married Chief Munhuwepayi Mangwende when she was 18. She was a rural school teacher from Murehwa. In 1950, Helen Mangwende created the FAWC (Federation of African Women Clubs). Mangwende was appalled at the conditions that colonialism put children and women under, leading to the creation of the FAWC. She helped establish the FAWC and founded several other women's clubs, including the Mrewa Bantu Club, which had over 700 members in 1950. In 1953, Helen Mangwende also went on a Royal Tour and met Queen Elizabeth. Princess Margaret helped finance the Mrewa Club's foundation during her European stay after the Royal Tour. Mangwende worked with white colonial women who also ran the clubs. Mangwende knew that the clubs' success relied on the active support of white women. Observers at the time thought of her as bridging the gap between races. Mangwende believed that education and skills training had to be brought to the African women and children who needed it instead of them traveling to school. She believed that educating and training African Women on home skills could improve the lives of their villages as a whole.

Mangwende focused on various kinds of gendered or domestic education and skill-building through her work with women's clubs and additional projects. Mangwende primarily taught skills in hygiene and cooking to help reduce the infant mortality rate in the villages she traveled to and created a better way of living. While Mangwende wanted opportunities for African women, colonial powers wanted to make wives of the elite and keen cultivators of colonial values. This was achieved by limiting education to vocational training and basic literacy. During the colonial era, education was often used to propagate the dominant culture and religion of Christianity while suppressing local traditions. This profoundly impacted colonized societies, which were forced to embrace the colonizers' values. The colonial powers reinforced their control and perpetuated gender inequalities within the educational system, reflecting broader colonial ideologies.

=== Appearance in Wives of Nendi film ===
In 1949, Helen Mangwende starred in and helped write a popular movie, The Wives of Nendi. The director of The Wives of Nendi noted that Mangwende was involved in almost every aspect of the film's writing process. In the movie, Mangwende played a maternal figure who trained and made suggestions for housekeeping in her village. Helen Mangwende plays Mai Mangwende in The Wives of Nendi. Her women’s club teaches a man named Nendi’s three wives how to keep their homes clean and how to cook. Nendi’s first wife does not want to follow the club's suggestions until Mangwende teaches her the skills. After Mangwende teaches Nendi’s wives home craft skills, they become some of the village's best cooks and home crafters. The movie highlighted the training and education that members of the FAWC would undergo. During one of the scenes, several women state that Mangwende improved their lives by teaching them how to clean their houses. There have been discussions and debates about the film's endorsement of colonial values. Some European producers and audience members believed the movie showcased Western culture's dissemination and colonialism's success. On the other hand, many African women interpreted the film to display women's power in creating a strong community, supporting African values rather than colonial ones.

== Legacy ==
Helen Mangwende touched the lives of many Africans. Her actions are celebrated in Zimbabwe on Helen Mangwende Day on March 14. Many Female Clubs based their values and principles on those of Mangwende, even after she died in 1955. Mangwende is noted as being as close to Christ himself, through her “pure” values as a women’s clubs leader. Mangwende is considered the Mother of Homecraft for creating ways for African Women to learn how to clean and cook in a way that supported their values. Helen Mangwende created a path where European and African women worked together through women’s clubs and the art of home craft. This act of both races working together this way was not seen before in colonial Zimbabwe.

== See also ==
- Southern Rhodesia in World War II
