= Uzumba–Maramba–Pfungwe =

District in Zimbabwe

Uzumba–Maramba–Pfungwe District
- Second-level administrative subdivision
- Interactive map of Uzumba–Maramba–Pfungwe District
- Country: Zimbabwe
- Province: Mashonaland East

Area
  - Total: 2,673 km^{2} (1,032 sq mi)

Population (2022 census)
  - Total: 124,226
  - Density: 46.47/km^{2} (120.4/sq mi)
- Time zone: UTC+1 (CET)
  - Summer (DST): UTC+1 (CEST)

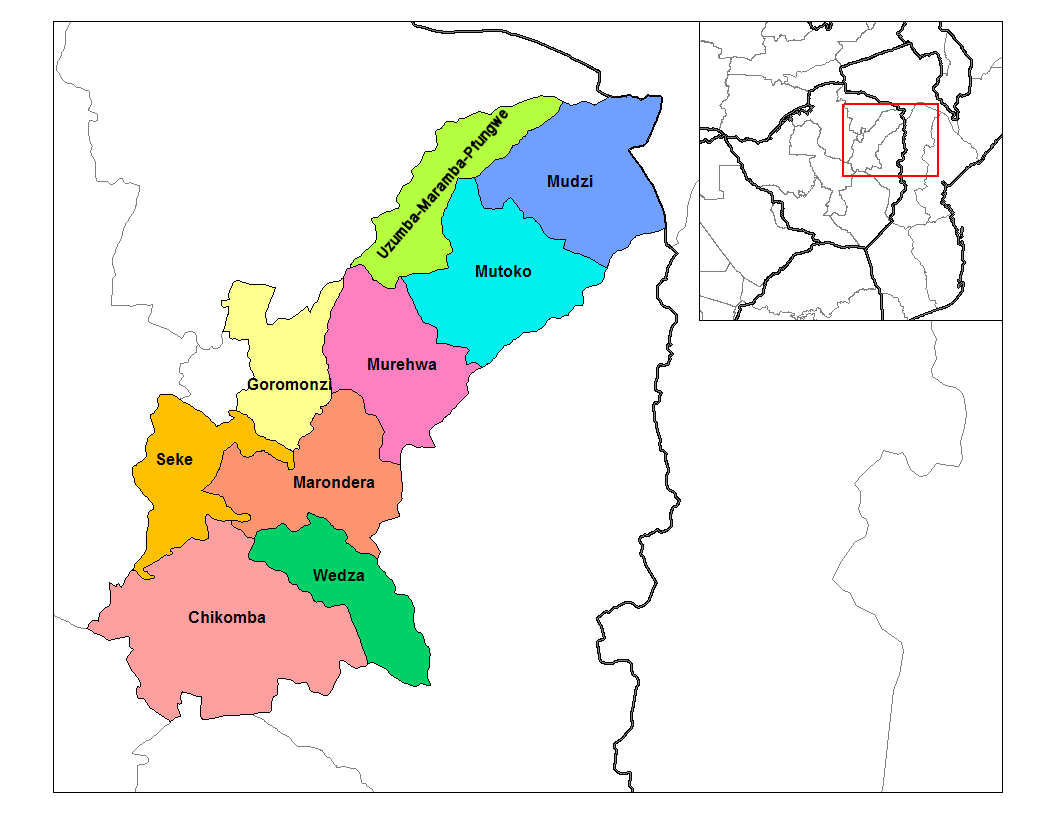

Uzumba-Maramba-Pfungwe, also known as UMP, is a district of Mashonaland East Province in Zimbabwe. It consists of the northern part of the pre-1969 larger Murehwa (Mrehwa) District and includes the village of Uzumba. The area is inhabited by the Budja Shona people. The staple food crop is maize, with secondary vegetable crops.

UMP is divided into two legislative constituencies, Uzumba Constituency which consists of the Nakiwa, Uzumba, Muswe, Nyadiri, and Karimbika areas; and Maramba-Pfungwe Constituency which consists of the Mutawatawa, Borera, Dindi, Kafura, Chitsungo and Mutawatawa areas. The area is very rural and undeveloped, mostly "peasant farmers who depend on subsistence farming", with a high poverty level.

== Culture ==
The Mbende Jerusarema dance of the Zezuru Shona people of Uzumba-Maramba-Pfungwe and Murewa is considered by UNESCO as an important part of the intangible culture of Zimbabwe.

== Notable people ==
- Alfred Nenguwo
