= Mangwende =

Mangwende is a dynasty from Southern Africa, Zimbabwe commonly known as Mangwende dynasty of Nhowe or Mangwende of Nhowe. It is the royal dynasty of the Nhowe people, who are a part of the Shona tribe now living in Murewa, Mashonaland East, Zimbabwe. The Mangwende dynasty was started by the patriarch of the Nhowe people, Sakubvunza in 1606 who established the Shona traditional state of Nhowe. The name Nhowe refers to the traditional state as well as the Nhowe people.

The Mangwende Chieftainship employs a system of collateral succession which alternates between two houses of the dynasty. The two houses of Chieftain lineage are Mhotani (Bokoto) and Hundungu (Chitopi) houses.

Totem

The totem of the Mangwende clan is "Moyo Muzukuru" which uses the bull as its symbolic animal. However, in practice, the tribe strictly holds only the heart of the animal as sacred, not the whole animal.

Chieftainships: 1606-2013

Mangwende dynasty, formerly in Matandandura and Matukutu, settles in Nhowe Mahopo mountain. The chieftainship changes hands between the two lineages on the death of the sitting Chief (unless the authorities deems otherwise).

Chieftainship	Dates
Sakubvunza	1606-1631
Gatsi	1633-1656
Mushawatu (Mungati I)	1657-1681
Dembetembe	1681-1706
Mhonyera	1707-1731
Nhuta	1732-1756
Zemura	1757-1781
Rota	1783-1831.
Mhotani	1833-1857
Hundungu	1859-1878
Katerere	1878-1879
Mungate II	1880-1924
Chibanda I	1926-1936
Munhuwepayi	1937-1960
Enoch	1960-1968
Chibanda II	1969-2013
Gatsi.	2018- TO DATE

Mhotani (Bokoto) and Hundungu (Chitopi) are the highest ranking names in modern-day history of Nhowe politics as they represent both Chieftainship (lineages) of Mungate1(Mushawatu) and Gatsi1. The names Bokoto and Chitopi houses are purely for administrative purposes. Two lineages lived in close proximity for over (3) three centuries at Mahopo Masekwa, Nyakambiri river near Marondera.

History

The Mangwende clan dominated the geographical area between Makoni and Mutoko in Mashonaland East, Zimbabwe, which then existed in the political format of traditional states. Mangwende had a fighting force that fought rival clans, and was often called to defend allies in battle. Within their territory, the Mangwende chieftainship had several sub-Chiefs of surrounding clans under their protectorate who would pledge allegiance to Chief Mangwende in return for military support if attacked by other rival Chiefs. As the paramount chief, Mangwende administered over the welfare, security and civil order of small chieftainship clans and presided in ceremonial duties.

The house of Hundungu who was chief from 1859 to 1878 was the first to assume the title of Chief Mangwende with proper Rozvi investiture. Prior to this period all Chiefs (Mambos) were called or known by their family names. It was about this time that there was a bit of animosity between the two chieftain lineages as it was alleged that the other lineage had attacked the other with a flock of bees from a charm (Gona). Katerere, father to Chiroodza and Chibanda, ruled for one year, 1878-1879 and died and was replaced by Mungate son of Hundungu, who became chief from 1880 to 1924. Mungate was chief at the time when the white settlers arrived in Zimbabwe, then Rhodesia. They were based at Mahopo Masekwa bordering Marondera. The totem is "Moyo Muzukuru", which belongs to entire Nhowe tribe. Most of the late Mangwende chiefs are buried at the Mangwende shrine in Mahopo Masekwa. Over a period of time the Bokoto house decided to bury their chiefs at an Area called Bokoto Hills in Mukarakate, before that they were all buried at Mahopo Masekwa. Only (3) three chiefs were not buried at the Mangwende Shrine, Mahopo Masekwa, being Katerere, Enoch and Chibanda 11 (two)

Defiance of White Settlers

White colonialists arrived around the period of 1890 disguised as hunters and missionaries and settled in the territory controlled by Chief Mungate Mangwende. At about 1896, Chief Mangwende fought white settlers who tried to impose on his territory in the famous battles that became known as the 1896 Uprising.

He led his forces to defend Makoni who had also been involved in resisting white settlement rule. Chief Mungate Mangwende's oldest son, Muchemwa, through orders from his father the chief fought the colonialist white settlers in the 1896 uprising in conjunction with Mbuya Nehanda and Kaguwi. After Chief Mungate Mangwende made peace with the White settlers (authorities) in 1896 his son Muchemwa together with other members of Nhowe war council which included Zihute, Gomba, Gatsi and Mukarakate continued to wage a guerrilla war as they were disgruntled with white settler rule. This war continued up to 1903 and ended in the fierce battle of Bokoto hills, which lasted several weeks. Muchemwa brokered a deal with the White Settlers (authorities) that he could only lay down his arms together with his lieutenants on condition he did not face any prosecution. The authorities agreed on one condition that he resided next to Murewa District Headquarters where he would be monitored. After the rebellion the white settlers took over the fertile land in Mahopo Masekwa and Chief Mungate was moved to a place called Rota, Chamachinda.

The village around the Murewa District Centre is known as the Mangwende Village, with most of its inhabitants being of Nhowe tribe Totem "Moyo Muzukuru". At the time of Muchemwa's death in 1909 (murdered), his father was still on the throne. At the time of his death, he left three sons, Mbumbira, Munhuwepayi, and Maiziveyi. His second son, Munhuwepayi, became a chief and ruled from 1937 to 1960. He was deposed from the chieftainship for continually disagreeing and criticizing white settlers administration decisions which was deemed to be gross insubordination. Munhuwepayi also married Helen Mangwende. Another contributing factor for the removal of Munhuwepayi was his participation in politics in the late 1950s 60s which he did up until independence 1980, in NDP (National Democratic Party) and then ZAPU (Zimbabwe African Peoples Union) which merged with ZANU (Zimbabwe African National Union) in 1987 into one party called Zimbabwe African National Union ZANU PF. Once dethroned he was sent to detention at Gonakudzingwa Restriction Camp, (Gonakudzingwa meaning "where the banished ones sleep") in Southern Rhodesia, near the Mozambique border, which was a special detention camp for ZAPU political prisoners set up by Ian Smith's government. There were already other political prisoners of the Mukarakate house who were detained at Gonakudzingwa, such as Phineas, Anesu and others. On his release Munhuwepayi, was banished from staying or visiting Murewa and restricted to 25 km (16 mi) radius of Salisbury, now Harare. Even when his relations died he was not allowed to attend the funerals among them his own children and young brother, Maiziveyi Mangwende who died in 1971. He later died in November 1988 and was buried at the Mangwende Shrine, at Mahopo Masekwa, near Marondera. His late brother Maiziveyi's four sons Innocent, Cyril, Alois and Godfrey as immediate and direct descendants of Muchemwa lineage, performed the traditional rites for the late Chief Munhuwepayi to be buried at the Mangwende Shrine.

Enock Mvurayawira, was appointed by the settler Ian Smith's government in 1960 to replace Munhuwepayi as Chief Mangwende, after the Bokoto house led by Muzanenhamo the eldest son of Sandati Mukarakate advised the settlers that culturally, Bokoto house could not accept the collateral succession while a substantive Chief Mangwende was still alive. "A living Mangwende can not be replaced". This was in line with proper traditional rites which require notification of the demise of a Chief through death, which could not be performed as Munhuwepayi was still alive.

After Enock Mvurayawira's death in 1968, Jonathan Tafirenyika Chibanda, son of Chataika Chibanda of the Bokoto House was appointed Chief Mangwende in 1969. He became a member of the Chiefs Council in 1973 and was elected President of the Zimbabwe Council of Chiefs in 1991, a position he held for 15 years until he decided to step down in 2005. He successfully engaged the Government on improving the status and role of Chiefs in Zimbabwe which led to a review and improvement of various sections of the Traditional Leaders Act and other statutes governing traditional leaders. Chief Jonathan Tafirenyika Mangwende died in Pretoria, South Africa in December, 2013 and was declared a Liberation Hero for his role in assisting the struggle and coordinating support for liberation fighters during the war of liberation which culminated in the independence of Zimbabwe in 1980. He was buried at the Bokoto Hills in Mukarakate with full military honors and proper traditional rites. He is remembered for his wise leadership as President of the Council of Chiefs in Zimbabwe and for strong and fair leadership of his people.

== Moyo Muturikwa, and the Mangwende Chieftainship ==
In August 2011, the Mashonaland East Provincial Governor, Aenius Chigwedere held a meeting with the VaNhohwe Clan, led by George Farayi Siyawamwaya. VaNhohwe were seeking official resettlement at Maganga Estates where Siyawamwaya was in residence. They argued that the colonialists drove them off the land in 1945, thus official resettlement is in order.

In the meeting, Aenius Chigwedere brought to light the historical issue relating to the Mangwende Chieftainship. Mentioning that the Chieftainship belonged to Moyo Muturikwa, not Moyo Muvhima nor the incumbent Moyo Muzukuru. He clarified that Moyo Muzukuru only ascended to the throne after gaining favour from the colonialists. Prior to that, Moyo Muturikwa held the Chieftainship.

Aneas Chigwedere’s theories can not be authenticated as these are mere claims. The Nhowe Clan settled in the area before the colonialists and have held the Mangwende Chieftainship since 1606, long before colonialists came to this country. Chief Mangwende and the Nhowe Clan fought against colonial forces in the first Chimurenga alongside Mbuya Nehanda and Sekuru Kaguvi.

It is worth noting that the records, as provided, are not available to the public to authenticate. Without citable information, there can be no way to see what has been included and, or omitted. Much of the connected history between the houses is citable. But the information of the Chieftainship stands disputed. There is no way to establish the credibility of the information provided. Much of that also remains as mere claims.
