= Alfred Nenguwo =

- Born: Uzumba, Zimbabwe
- Musical career
- Genres: Afro-jazz - Afro-pop
- Instrument: Vocals
- Years active: 2008-present

Alfred Nenguwo and is a Zimbabwean award-winning Afro-jazz singer and songwriter.

== Background ==
Alfred Nenguwo, born in Uzumba, Zimbabwe, is the oldest in a family of six. He was raised by his grandparents in the high-density suburb of Mbare, Harare. His grandfather used to listen to a lot of jazz music, so he would end up singing along to the music a lot. His uncles were also musical; one played the Mbira and the other one was a Reggae artist. Nenguwo started singing in the school choir when he was in primary school.

== Music career ==
After singing in the school choir and later his church choir, Nenguwo joined a group called Afro-Diverse in 2008. In 2013, he teamed up with singer Millicent Muchati, and they recorded an album entitled African Sun. The album was nominated three times at the 2014 ZIMA Awards, winning the best newcomers’ award.

== Discography ==
Studio albums

African Sun (2013)

Extended plays

LALELA (2015)
