= Borrowdale dance =

The Borrowdale dance (also known as the dance of horses) is a Zimbabwean dance named after the horse-racing track situated in the Borrowdale suburb of Zimbabwe's capital city, Harare. The dance is characterised by fancy footwork and galloping body movements in the style of racing horses. The dance was popularized by members of the Khiama Boyz, including Macheso, Madzibaba, and Tazvida.

== See also ==
- Dance in Zimbabwe
