= Mbende Jerusarema dance =

Traditional dance in Zimbabwe

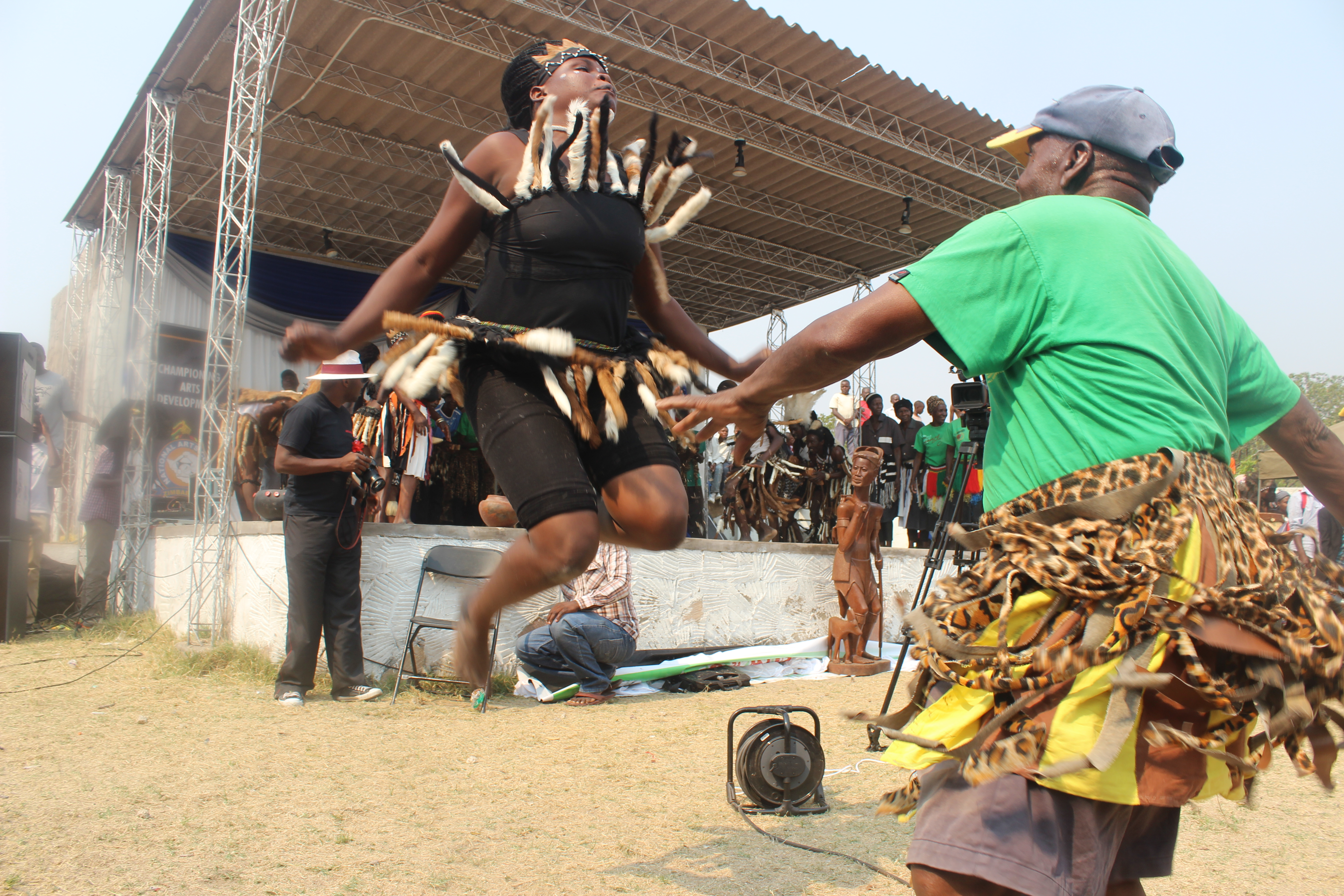
- Mbende Jerusarema dance
- Native name: Mbende Jerusarema
- Etymology: "fast-running mouse"
- Genre: Traditional dance
- Instrument(s): Drum, Skins of animals used as skirts
- Inventor: The Zezuru people of Murehwa and Uzumba-Maramba-Pfungwe
- Year: Before 1890
- Origin: Zimbabwe

Mbende Jerusarema dance is a prominent dance style among the Zezuru Shona of eastern Zimbabwe, particularly in the Murewa and Uzumba-Maramba-Pfungwe districts. Traditional dances and performances, such as Jerusarema, are still vital living traditions in Zimbabwe, performed in a variety of settings and respected by local communities. Traditional dances are done for a variety of reasons, including entertainment, ritual, festivals, and memorial and celebration. The Shona used Jerusarema as a battle dance and a diversionary technique during military encounters, according to popular belief. Weddings, festivities, recreational competitions, funerals, and political meetings are all occasions for Jerusarema to be performed.

== Etymology ==
The dance was originally known as Mbende, which means "fast-running mouse". It got its name from the fast striking movement done by dancers when they heard the Jerusarema's melody.

== History ==
The Zezuru people of Murehwa and Uzumba-Maramba-Pfungwe (UPM) districts created the Jerusarema/Mbende dance. The Zezuru people, who make up a quarter of all Shona speakers, are traditionally the dancers of Jerusarema/Mbende, according to these districts of Zimbabwe's Mashonaland East province. The dance has been performed in three eras of Zimbabwean culture: pre-colonial before 1890, colonial from 1890 to 1980, and post-colonial from 1980 to now. It is believed that Jerusarema/Mbende began as a military dance, fertility dance, hunting dance, and death dance. This demonstrates that the Zezuru community used Jerusarema dancing for ritual purposes. Its original name was Mbende, which is the name of a burrowing and extremely fast-running mouse. Mbende refers to the dancers' mimicking and copying of the rodent's darting motions. Mbende is a curious name that has revealed a lot about the dance's evolution through the years.

The name of the dance was changed to Jerusarema, derived from the Shona adaption of the name of the city of Jerusalem, to give it with a religious connotation, under the influence of Christian missionaries who severely disapproved of this sexually explicit dance. Today, both names are regularly used. Despite the missionaries' censure, the dance remained popular and became a source of pride and identity in the resistance to colonial power.

The second history explains that the missionaries were informed by village chiefs that all significant events in their territory had to be remembered by their people utilizing the Zezuru traditional dances. The chiefs demanded that Mbende dance be allowed in the celebration of Jesus Christ's birth, and that it be renamed Jerusarema. Mbende dance became known as Jerusarema when the request was granted. Following the chiefs' persuasive request for the dance's name to be changed from Mbende to Jerusarema, the dance recovered its holy and historical status within the Zezuru culture.

== Description ==
The dance is characterized by seductive, acrobatic waist-shaking and hip motions by women in sync with males, with both dancers culminating with intense pelvic thrusts directed towards each other, causing audience ecstasy. These movements made the dance controversial among missionaries, who mistook them for sexually graphic and suggestive moves. One master drummer performs the music, which is accompanied by clappers, rattles, and costumes. Drumming, singing, clapping, and rattle playing combine to create a polyrhythmic sound that propels the dancers forward. During the dance, there are two main areas of activity: a line of musicians who are constantly playing the beats, and a group of ladies and men who take turns dancing.

Asante's (1985) assessment of Jerusarema as an 'image dance,' in the sense that it imitates an animal, sheds light on the dance. However, in the instance of mbende (mouse/mole), the goal is to use the mouse as a symbol of rapidity, fertility, sexuality, and family, rather than just imitating it. While the picture and characteristics of a mouse are projected, there is minimal actual imitating or caricaturing of a mouse. The men, on the other hand, frequently crouch while jerking both arms and forcefully kicking the ground with the right leg, as if imitating a tunneling mole kicking soil to the surface, throughout the dance.

== Mbende Jerusarema struggle and survival ==
The singularity of Jerusarema, as well as its dramatic impact and meaning, made it open to a variety of interpretations, which persist to this day. The dance's aim and meaning are frequently misconstrued; it is denounced for being too seductive and sensual, and its widespread popularity was considered as a threat to the Christian Church's efforts to gain disciples. Dance has been commercialized in the city, and new twisted versions have evolved, which have been widely criticized. The post-colonial administration has recently modified and adapted the dance in order to establish a 'acceptable' form for usage during official political events. The Mbende traditional dance, now known by its Christian name, Jerusarema, is distinctive not just for the people of Murehwa, but for the entire nation, as it is featured prominently at all national occasions. The traditional name of Jerusarema was Mbende, with the former being a scriptural derivative from Israel's holy city of Jerusalem, reportedly to make the dance more palatable to Christian missionaries. Both the rural and urban districts continue to practice Jerusarema. There are numerous Jerusarema dance clubs in Murehwa and beyond, and the dance continues to be performed during festive occasions, funerals, political rallies, and weddings, with Jerusarema being one of their main performances.

== Cultural materials used ==
The dance and its important material culture are linked to the history, culture, and identity of the indigenous people. The majority of the material objects used by the dancers fall into two categories: clothing and musical instruments. The most prominent tangible component of Jerusarema is a range of musical instruments and dancing attire. The most noticeable instrument is the "mutumba", or drum. The "mutiti" tree (erythrina abyssinia) or the "mutsvanzwa" tree (pseodolanchnostylisis maprouneifolia) are used to make it due to its size . This is a rare yet well-protected indigenous tree that was chosen for its high quality wood, strength and hardness, and excellent resonance capabilities. Wooden clappers (maja/manja) are another musical instrument used to create a well-coordinated beat with the singing and drumming. The strength of hard wood trees like the mutara tree (Gardenia spaturiflora) is chosen. This is necessary to endure the constant impact of clapping on the wood.

The dancing outfits are the second most important type of Mbende Jerusarema material items. These were traditionally made of animal skins, but due to the influence of western attire, they have been modernized, and today's dancers generally wear textile costumes with animal skins. Leopard, monkey, cheetah, and wild cat skins were used, as their leather is flexible, comfortable to wear, and easy to work with. Other domestic animals' skins, such as cattle, goats, and sheep, are occasionally used, but the quality of these garments is far inferior to that of those produced from wild animal skins.
