= Muchongoyo dance =

Traditional dance in Zimbabwe

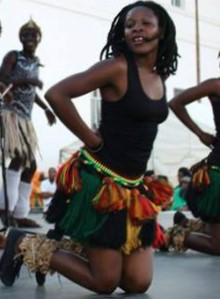
- Muchongoyo dance in Zimbabwe
- Etymology: kuchongoya
- Genre: Presentational dance
- Inventor: Ndau people
- Origin: Zimbabwe

Muchongoyo is a presentational dance and drumming style that emphasizes acrobatic and stomping sequences to dazzle spectators during gatherings or competitions with a complementary rythme of sharp claps. In Zimbabwe, it is the most well-liked Ndau dance. In Zimbabwe's Chipinge, Chimanimani, Chiredzi, and Buhera districts, muchongoyo is a traditional dance that is performed for celebratory purposes or events of cultural significance such as burials of chief and royals. It particularly identifies with the Ndau people, though less strongly identifies with the Tsonga (Shangani) people. Muchongolo is the name of it in Tsonga.

== Etymology ==
The word Muchongoyo comes from the Ndau word kuchongoya, which means to stamp one's foot.

== History ==
The purpose of the violent foot stomping in muchongoyo is historically to chastise warriors before battle and to celebrate success afterward. The dance is now practiced to provide entertainment at occasions like traditional weddings, chief installation ceremonies, harvest festivals, keeping fit while dating, or in honor of a deceased dancer. Muchongoyo does not lean toward any particular faith, in contrast to other dances.

== Description ==
Men and women both perform it. While the women sing words to inspire the dancers, the men do the choreography. There is a cow horn formation in the dance. There are often eight men and eight women in it. Six male dancers make up the front row, two men play the drums in the middle, and women make up the rear row.

A lead guy known as chikopo performs a solo introductory act known as Mungeneso to introduce the dance. He gives instructions for the act by whistling. The women sing and clap their hands in unison. Then there is a drumbeat. The following stage is called chibhubhubhu, which is choreographed and performed in synchronization. Anyone who stomps otherwise is viewed as an outcast. Dancers would eventually collapse as a ruse to take a break after a while. Then, as the other 260 girls cheered to encourage the dancers, two women danced rhythmically, bringing in refreshments (if available) or arriving with little cloths to remove sweat and fan the performers. The dancers would execute what is known as chigiyo after the choreographed acts. In solo or duo performances, dancers can now display their unique talents. Finally, they escape by mubudiso.

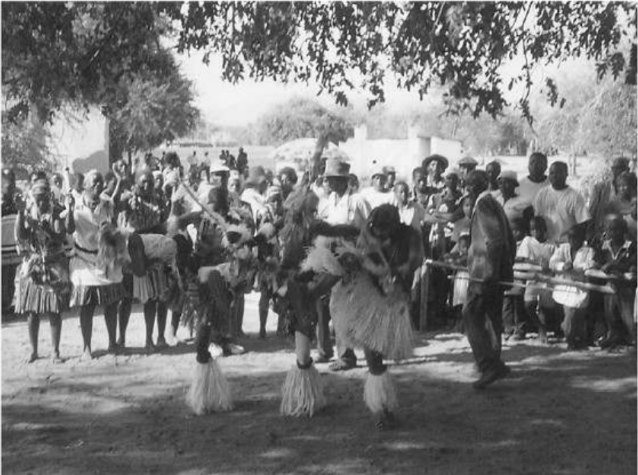
Muchongoyo dance performed by changadzi

== Struggle and survival ==
Muchongoyo has received a lot of attention from social circles. Wealthy individuals known as Makorwa organized muchongoyo galas in the communities in the 1960s and 1970s, which is when it all began. The group would compete for handkerchief-sized awards. Businessman and politician Wilson Kumbula created out-of-school time groups' galas in Checheche in Chipinge South at the turn of the millennium. A analogous out-of-school group gala was created by Mr. Enock Porusingazi, another businessman and politician, 50 years later. Around 2010, the two galas were on their way out. That year saw the creation of yet another gala, this time under the name Mtetwa Wamuka Cultural Symposium, which was pushed by Mrs. Marcia Moyana, the wife of Dr. Kombo Moyana, a former governor of the Reserve Bank of Zimbabwe. It mostly caters to students in schools. The Ndau Festival of the Arts (NDAFA), directed by Mr. Phillip Kusasa, was established in 2013. In Chipinge East, it catered to both after-school and school groups.

In 2013, Mrs. Moyana raised the profile of muchongoyo, allowing Garahwa Muchongoyo to perform three times at the HIFA in Harare and once at Sam Levy Village in Borrowdale. The response muchongoyo received at the two locations is unmistakable proof that muchongoyo is a wholly homegrown tourism product. We want muchongoyo to be promoted both locally and beyond, Mr. Moyana said. We want visitors from other countries to experience our distinctive culture.

== Cultural materials used ==
The dancers perform while wearing traditional attire, which for men includes mbikiza and vests on the body, either ngututu or feathers on the head, zvihlabvu or machoba on the legs and arms, and manyatera (sandals) on the feet. For women, the attire includes maqeyo on the head, zvipetu (combs) in the hair, ketani (tie) on the body, matimwa (multicolored beads) around the neck, madhuku (breast-covering doeks) over the chest, chikisa (colored miniskirts), and matuza (an aluminum ring) around the arms.
