= Mukarakate =

Place in Murewa, Mashonaland East, Zimbabwe

Mukarakate is a place in the north-eastern Murewa district of Zimbabwe. The district is in Mashonaland East province of Zimbabwe. It is almost entirely inhabited by Shona-speaking people (specific dialect: Zezuru). The traditional rulers of the area are the Nhowe people, whose chieftainship is called Mangwende. Many of the Nhowe people use Mukarakate as a surname, because it is the name of a great-great-ancestor of the tribe. Their totem is 'Moyo Muzukuru', which uses the bull as its symbolic animal. However, in practice, the tribe strictly holds only the heart of the animal as sacred, not the whole animal. Currently, the Mangwende Chieftainship is vacant following the death of Jonathan Tafirenyika Chibanda who passed on in South Africa on 16 December 2013. Chief Jonathan Mangwende was once president of the chief's council. Jonathan Tafirenyika Chibanda was the son of Chief Chataika Chibanda Mangwende. Chibanda became chief Mangwende in 1926 and died in 1936. Chibanda only ruled for 10 years. Jonathan Tafirenyika Chibanda become chief Mangwende in 1968. Prior to that he was a teacher at Chinhenga primary school. It is widely believed that the next Chief Mangwende will come from the Bokoto lineage. In modern-day Zimbabwe, the surname is still widely used in the area. Mukarakate is at the border post of Murewa south and Mutoko South

Contrary to the above, major aspects of the Mangwende Chieftainship history were missed. Please refer to article on Mangwende.

http://www.geody.com/geospot.php?world=terra&map=col&ufi=10644189&alc=mkr&start=100 Zhombwe mountains
