= Murewa =

Murehwa
- Town
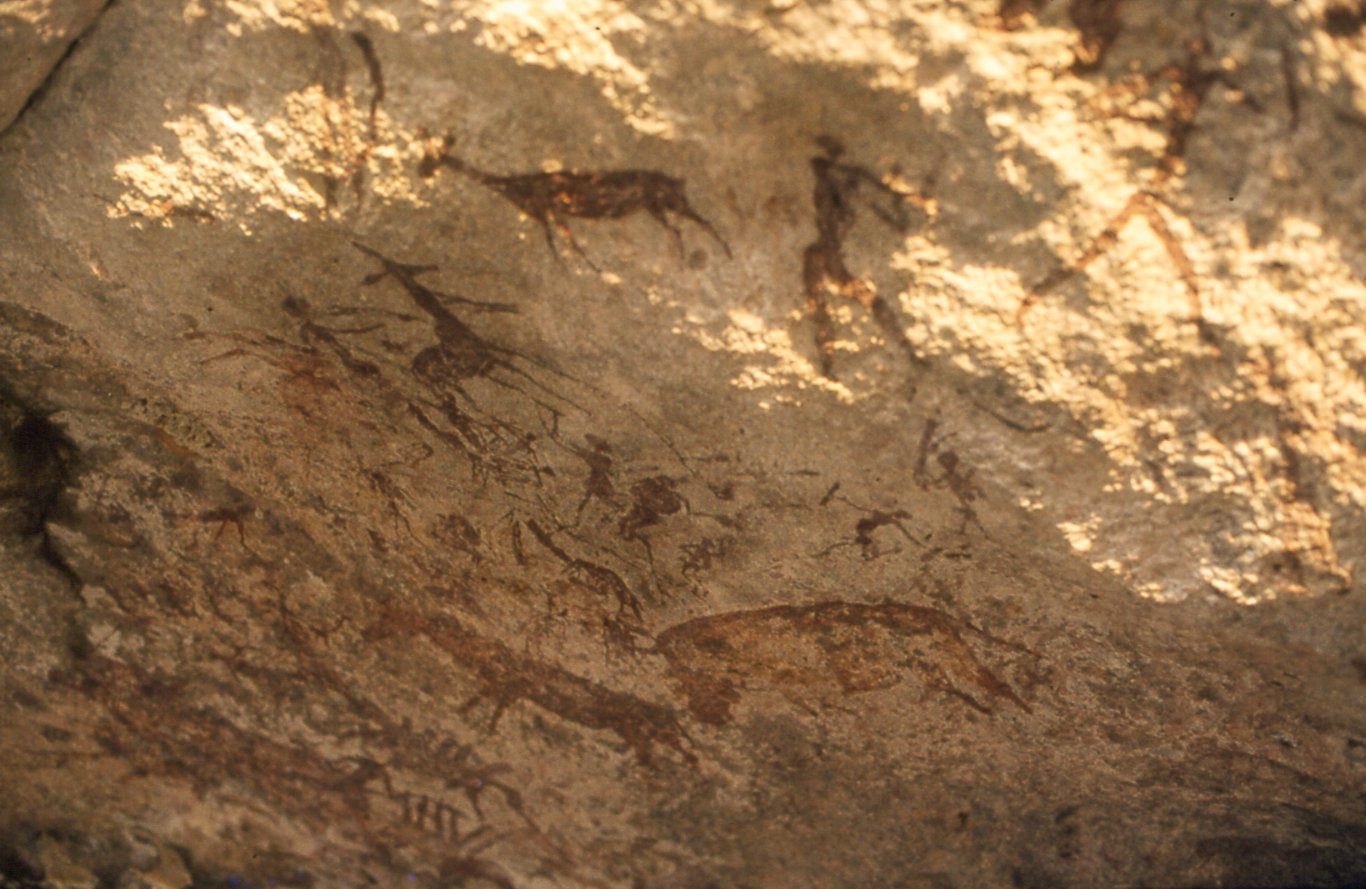
- Murewa Caves: San paintings

- Location within Zimbabwe
- Coordinates: 17°39′S 31°47′E
- Country: Zimbabwe
- Province: Mashonaland East
- District: Murehwa District
- Elevation: 1,368 m (4,488 ft)

Population (2012 Census)
  - Total: 16,666
- Time zone: UTC+1 (CET)
  - Summer (DST): UTC+1 (CEST)
- Climate: BSh

Murewa, originally known as Mrewa and alternatively rendered Muhrewa, is a township (and district) in Zimbabwe, 75 kilometers northeast of the capital Harare, on the road to Tete (Mozambique). It is situated almost 1400 m above sea level. In 2002, the number of inhabitants was 8398. Public and private buildings are simple. "Growthpoint" and village have the character of a township. Nearby there are the Murewa Caves having three tunnels, some as short as 9 km, and other sites with rock paintings of the San. These paintings are at least 1000 years old.

== District ==
The district of Murewa stretches from Mt. Hanwa (10 km north of Macheke) in the south up to Uzumba in the north, Nyadire Rive NE and Nyaguvi SE of Murewa. It is dominated by traditional African agriculture of the Shona people. Only the southern quarter of the area is covered with commercial farms, founded by European settlers. In that area there are three hilltop fortresses belonging to the Murewa (Moyo) people, built in the later phase of ancient Monomotapa State under the Chieftainship family on Murewa, after 1500 AD.

== See also ==
- Mukarakate
