= 1st Parliament of Zimbabwe =

The 1st Parliament of Zimbabwe began in 1980 and expired in 1985. Per the Lancaster House Agreement, 20 out of the 100 seats in the House of Assembly and 10 out of the 40 seats in the Senate were reserved for white Zimbabweans. The Parliament's membership was set by the 1980 Southern Rhodesian general election, which gave ZANU–PF a nearly 57 percent majority of common seats in the House of Assembly, with PF–ZAPU taking most of the remaining seats. The 20 seats reserved for whites were initially all held by the conservative Rhodesian Front, but a majority later became independents.

== Composition ==
=== Senate ===
Party	Start	End
ZANU–PF	18	18
ZAPU–PF	2	2
CAZ (Note: The Rhodesian Front was succeeded in 1981 by the Republican Front, and in 1984 by the Conservative Alliance of Zimbabwe.)	10	6
Ind. (Note: Includes members of the Independent Zimbabwe Group, a bloc formed by white independent MPs in 1983.)	0	4
Chiefs	10	10
Total	40	40

=== House of Assembly ===
Date	Party					Total	Vacant
Date	CAZ	UANC	ZANU–PF	ZAPU–PF	Ind.	Total	Vacant
14 May 1980 (opened)	20	3	57	20	0	100	0
October 1980	20	3	57	19	0	99	1
Late 1980	19	3	57	19	0	98	2
Early 1981	19	3	57	20	0	99	1
January 1981	20	3	57	20	0	100	0
April 1981	19	3	57	20	0	99	1
June 1981	18	3	57	20	0	98	2
July 1981	20	3	57	20	0	100	0
November 1981	19	3	57	20	0	99	1
December 1981	18	3	57	20	0	98	2
February 1982	19	3	57	20	0	99	1
4 March 1982	12	3	57	20	7	99	1
6 March 1982	11	3	57	20	8	99	1
9 March 1982	10	3	57	20	9	99	1
April 1982	11	3	57	20	9	100	0
24 June 1982	11	3	57	19	9	99	1
19 August 1982	10	3	57	18	9	98	2
25 August 1982	10	3	57	19	9	98	2
Late 1982	9	3	56	19	9	97	3
18 January 1983	10	3	57	20	9	99	1
19 April 1983	10	3	57	20	10	100	0
Mid-1983	9	3	57	20	10	99	1
30 September 1983	9	3	57	20	11	100	0
1 January 1984	8	3	57	20	11	99	1
February 1984	8	3	57	20	12	100	0
1 October 1984	8	3	57	19	12	99	1
October 1984	8	3	56	19	12	98	2
December 1984	7	3	56	19	12	97	3
1985	6	3	56	20	13	98	2

== Senate ==
=== Common seats ===
Name	Party	Notes	Ref.
Bernard Chidzero	ZANU–PF		
George Chinengundu	ZANU–PF		
Mudhumeni Chivende	ZANU–PF		
Joseph Culverwell	ZANU–PF		
Johnson Hungwe	ZANU–PF		
Lameck Makanda	ZANU–PF		
Agrippa Makunde	ZANU–PF	Left office in 1982. (Note: Makunde was convicted of ordering seven followers to burn down ZAPU offices.)	
Fred Moyo	ZANU–PF		
Simbi Mubako	ZANU–PF		
Tsitsi Munyati	ZANU–PF		
Alick Ndlovu	ZANU–PF		
Moven Ndlovu	ZANU–PF	Died 9 November 1984. (Note: Ndlovu was assassinated by ZAPU rebels at his home in Beitbridge, Matabeleland South.)	
Enos Nkala	ZANU–PF		
John Shoniwa	ZANU–PF		
Sunny Takawira	ZANU–PF		
Rekayi Tangwena	ZANU–PF		
Tarisai Ziyambi	ZANU–PF		
Joseph Msika	PF–ZAPU		
Garfield Todd	PF–ZAPU		
Denis Norman	Independent		
Fanuel Chingoma	Chief		
C. P. Chitanga	Chief		
Myinga Dakamela	Chief		
Mtozima Gwebu	Chief		
Lameck Mashayamombe	Chief		
Edgar Tiyeni Msikavanhu	Chief		
Kayisa Ndiweni	Chief		
M. M. Nyati	Chief		
M. K. Ncube	Chief		
M. D. M. Whata	Chief		

=== White seats ===
Name	Party	Notes	Ref.
Lou Ankers	Rhodesian Front (Note: The Rhodesian Front was succeeded in 1981 by the Republican Front, and in 1984 by the Conservative Alliance of Zimbabwe.)		
Bob Blunt	Rhodesian Front		
Margaret Clark	Rhodesian Front	Left office before 1984.	
Ken Fleming	Rhodesian Front		
Douglas Hamilton Ritchie	Rhodesian Front	Resigned September 1980. (Note: Hamilton Ritchie was succeeded on 11 February 1981 by Archie Wilson. Wilson resigned in 1982 and was succeeded by Esme Scott in August 1982.)	
George Hartley	Rhodesian Front		
Jack Mussett	Rhodesian Front	Left office before 1984.	
Mark Partridge	Rhodesian Front		
Paul Savage	Rhodesian Front	Murdered 2 April 1983. (Note: Savage was succeeded by Brian Grubb in May 1983.)	
Sam Whaley	Rhodesian Front		

== House of Assembly ==
=== Common seats ===
Name	Party	Province	Notes	Ref.
Kumbirai Kangai	ZANU–PF	Manicaland		
Maurice Nyagumbo	ZANU–PF	Manicaland		
Didymus Mutasa	ZANU–PF	Manicaland		
William Ndangana	ZANU–PF	Manicaland		
Frederick Shava	ZANU–PF	Manicaland		
Victoria Chitepo	ZANU–PF	Manicaland		
Naomi Nhiwatiwa	ZANU–PF	Manicaland		
Moven Mahachi	ZANU–PF	Manicaland		
Joshua Dhube	ZANU–PF	Manicaland		
Columbus Makoni	ZANU–PF	Manicaland		
Ezekiel Sanyangare	ZANU–PF	Manicaland		
Edgar Tekere	ZANU–PF	Mashonaland Central		
Joice Mujuru	ZANU–PF	Mashonaland Central		
Sydney Sekeramayi	ZANU–PF	Mashonaland Central		
Farai Masango	ZANU–PF	Mashonaland Central	Resigned October 1980. (Note: Masango was appointed high commissioner to Tanzania. He was succeeded by Moton Malianga in January 1981.)	
George Rutanhire	ZANU–PF	Mashonaland Central		
Joseph Kaparadza	ZANU–PF	Mashonaland Central		
Robert Mugabe	ZANU–PF	Mashonaland East		
Mark Nuda Dube	ZANU–PF	Mashonaland East		
Robert Marere	ZANU–PF	Mashonaland East		
Witness Mangwende	ZANU–PF	Mashonaland East		
Moses Mvenge	ZANU–PF	Mashonaland East		
Edson Shirihuru	ZANU–PF	Mashonaland East		
Edward Pswarayi	ZANU–PF	Mashonaland East		
Grafton Ziyenge	ZANU–PF	Mashonaland East		
Philemon Murambiwa	ZANU–PF	Mashonaland East	Died 16/01/2021 at 90 years	
Jack Hunda	ZANU–PF	Mashonaland East		
Horace Nyazika	ZANU–PF	Mashonaland East		
Godfrey Chidyausiku	ZANU–PF	Mashonaland East		
Abraham Kabasa	ZANU–PF	Mashonaland East		
Shadreck Rambanepasi	ZANU–PF	Mashonaland East		
Abel Muzorewa	UANC	Mashonaland East		
Silas Mundawarara	UANC	Mashonaland East		
Robson Manyika	ZANU–PF	Mashonaland West		
J. Chivaura	ZANU–PF	Mashonaland West		
Nathan Shamuyarira	ZANU–PF	Mashonaland West		
Alexio Mudzingwa	ZANU–PF	Mashonaland West		
Swethan Mombeshora	ZANU–PF	Mashonaland West		
Enos Chikowore	ZANU–PF	Mashonaland West		
Ariston Chambati	PF–ZAPU	Mashonaland West	Resigned October 1980. (Note: Chambati was appointed ambassador to West Germany. He was succeeded by Josiah Chinamano in January 1981. Chinamano died on 1 October 1984 and was succeeded by Kenneth Mano.)	
Titus Mukarati	UANC	Mashonaland West		
Herbert Ushewokunze	ZANU–PF	Matabeleland North		
Vote Moyo	PF–ZAPU	Matabeleland North		
Donald Mangena	PF–ZAPU	Matabeleland North	Died 24 June 1982. (Note: Mangena was succeeded by Sikajaya Andrew Muntanga on 25 August 1982.)	
Sydney Malunga	PF–ZAPU	Matabeleland North		
Jini Ntuta	PF–ZAPU	Matabeleland North	Died 19 November 1984.	
John Nkomo	PF–ZAPU	Matabeleland North		
Daniel Ngwenya	PF–ZAPU	Matabeleland North		
Ruth Chinamano	PF–ZAPU	Matabeleland North		
Jane Ngwenya	PF–ZAPU	Matabeleland North		
Thenjiwe Lesabe	PF–ZAPU	Matabeleland North		
George Silundika	PF–ZAPU	Matabeleland South	Died 9 April 1981.	
Stephen Nkomo	PF–ZAPU	Matabeleland South		
Edward Ndlovu	PF–ZAPU	Matabeleland South		
Boyson Mguni	PF–ZAPU	Matabeleland South		
Callistus Ndlovu	PF–ZAPU	Matabeleland South		
Peter Njini	PF–ZAPU	Matabeleland South		
Akim Ndlovu	PF–ZAPU	Matabeleland South	Expelled 19 August 1982. (Note: Ndlovu missed 21 consecutive sittings of Parliament, the threshold for expulsion. He had fled to Zambia.)	
Tamai Vivian Mpofu	PF–ZAPU	Matabeleland South	Sworn on 18 January 1983.	
Simon Muzenda	ZANU–PF	Midlands		
Ernest Kadungure	ZANU–PF	Midlands		
Emmerson Mnangagwa	ZANU–PF	Midlands		
Richard Hove	ZANU–PF	Midlands		
Simba Makoni	ZANU–PF	Midlands		
Samuel Mumbengewi	ZANU–PF	Midlands		
Julia Tukai Zvobgo	ZANU–PF	Midlands		
Saviour Mativenga	ZANU–PF	Midlands		
Joshua Nkomo	PF–ZAPU	Midlands		
Clement Muchachi	PF–ZAPU	Midlands		
Cephas Msipa	PF–ZAPU	Midlands		
William Kona	PF–ZAPU	Midlands		
Samuel Mamutse	ZANU–PF	Victoria (Note: Victoria Province was renamed Masvingo Province in 1982.)		
Dzingai Mutumbuka	ZANU–PF	Victoria		
Eddison Zvobgo	ZANU–PF	Victoria		
Sheba Tavarwisa	ZANU–PF	Victoria		
Nollan Makombe	ZANU–PF	Victoria		
Simon Mazorodze	ZANU–PF	Victoria		
Oliver Munyaradzi	ZANU–PF	Victoria		
James Bassopo Moyo	ZANU–PF	Victoria	Convicted October 1984. (Note: Bassopo Moyo served in Parliament until his 1984 criminal conviction.)	
Nelson Mawema	ZANU–PF	Victoria		
Dzikamai Mavhaire	ZANU–PF	Victoria		
Albert Taderera	ZANU–PF	Victoria		

=== White seats ===
Name	Party	Constituency	Notes	Ref.
John Landau	Rhodesian Front (until 1982)	Avondale		
John Landau	Independent (from 1982)	Avondale		
David Smith	Rhodesian Front	Borrowdale	Resigned 30 April 1981. (Note: Smith was succeeded by John Probert in July 1981.)	
Paddy Shields	Rhodesian Front (until 1982)	Bulawayo Central		
Paddy Shields	Independent (from 1982)	Bulawayo Central		
Denis Walker	Rhodesian Front	Bulawayo North	Expelled 19 August 1982. (Note: Walker was succeeded by Guybon Cumming on 18 January 1983.)	
Wally Stuttaford	Rhodesian Front	Bulawayo South	Criminal conviction in 1982. (Note: Beginning in December 1981, Stuttaford was detained by Zimbabwean authorities under emergency powers. He was later released before being detained again.)	
Rowan Cronjé	Rhodesian Front	Central	Resigned November 1981. (Note: Cronjé resigned to take a job offer outside Zimbabwe. He was succeeded by Tony Berkhout in February 1982.)	
Desmond Butler	Rhodesian Front	Eastern		
P. K. van der Byl	Rhodesian Front	Gatooma–Hartley		
Richard Cartwright	Rhodesian Front (until 1982)	Hatfield		
Richard Cartwright	Independent (from 1982)	Hatfield		
Robert Gaunt	Rhodesian Front	Highlands	Resigned 1980. (Note: Gaunt was succeeded by James Thrush in January 1981.)	
Dennis Divaris	Rhodesian Front (until 1982)	Kopje		
Dennis Divaris	Independent (from 1982)	Kopje		
Donald Goddard	Rhodesian Front	Lundi	Died 1 January 1984. (Note: Goddard was succeeded by Peter Field in February 1984.)	
Arthur Tapson	Rhodesian Front	Makoni	Resigned 1983. (Note: Tapson was succeeded by Jock Kay in October 1983.)	
William Michie Irvine	Rhodesian Front (until 1982)	Marlborough		
William Michie Irvine	Independent (from 1982)	Marlborough		
André Sothern Holland	Rhodesian Front	Mazoe–Mtoko	Resigned June 1981. (Note: Holland was succeeded by Geoff York in July 1981.)	
Henry Elsworth	Rhodesian Front (until 1982)	Midlands		
Henry Elsworth	Independent (from 1982)	Midlands		
Chris Andersen	Rhodesian Front (until 1982)	Mount Pleasant		
Chris Andersen	Independent (from 1982)	Mount Pleasant		
Esmond Micklem	Rhodesian Front (until 1982)	Northern		
Esmond Micklem	Independent (from 1982)	Northern		
Ian Smith	Rhodesian Front	Southern		
Alec Moseley	Rhodesian Front	Western	Resigned December 1981. (Note: Moseley was succeeded by Desmond Chalmers in April 1982.)	

== Membership changes ==
=== Senate ===
Vacated by	Party	Reason for change	Successor	Party	Installed	Ref.
Douglas Hamilton Ritchie	Rhodesian Front	Resigned September 1980 due to ill health.	Archibald Wilson	Rhodesian Front	11 February 1981	
Archibald Wilson	Rhodesian Front	Resigned in 1982 due to ill health.	Esme Scott	Independent	August 1982	
Agrippa Makunde	ZANU–PF	Criminal conviction in 1982.	Missing			
Jack Mussett	Rhodesian Front	Resigned in 1983.	Max Rosenfels	Independent	April 1983	
Paul Savage	Rhodesian Front	Died 2 April 1983. (Note: Savage was murdered at his Matabeleland farm by ZAPU rebels.)	Brian Grubb	Independent	May 1983	
Margaret Clark	Rhodesian Front	Left office in 1980.	Terence Oatt	Rhodesian Front	1980	
Moven Ndlovu	ZANU–PF	Died 9 November 1984.	Missing			
Missing	Chief		Zephaniah Charumbira	Chief	Before 1984.	

=== House of Assembly ===
Constituency/province	Vacated by	Party	Reason for change	Successor	Party	Installed	Ref.
Victoria	Nollan Makombe	ZANU–PF	Became president of the Senate in May 1980.	Missing			
Mashonaland West	Ariston Chambati	PF–ZAPU	Resigned October 1980 to become ambassador to West Germany.	Josiah Chinamano	PF–ZAPU	1981	
Mashonaland Central	Farai Masango	ZANU–PF	Resigned October 1980 to become high commissioner to Tanzania.	Moton Malianga	ZANU–PF	1981	
Highlands	Robert Gaunt	Rhodesian Front	Resigned 1980.	James Thrush	Rhodesian Front (Note: Thrush was elected as a Rhodesian Front member, but resigned to become an independent on 4 March 1982.)	January 1981	
Borrowdale	David Smith	Rhodesian Front	Resigned 30 April 1981.	John Probert	Republican Front	July 1981	
Matabeleland South	George Silundika	PF–ZAPU	Died 9 April 1981.	Missing			
Mazoe–Mtoko	André Sothern Holland	Rhodesian Front	Resigned June 1981 to form Democratic Party. (Note: Holland ran unsuccessfully as the Democratic Party candidate in the by-election to win his former seat.)	Geoff York	Rhodesian Front (Note: York was elected as a Rhodesian Front member, but resigned to become an independent in 1985.)	July 1981	
Central	Rowan Cronjé	Rhodesian Front	Resigned November 1981 to emigrate. (Note: Cronjé emigrated to take a job offer in another Southern African country.)	Tony Berkhout	Republican Front	February 1982	
Western	Alec Moseley	Rhodesian Front	Resigned December 1981 due to ill health.	Desmond Chalmers	Republican Front	April 1982	
Bulawayo South	Wally Stuttaford	Rhodesian Front	Criminal conviction in 1982.	Bob Nixon	Independent	19 April 1983	
	Donald Mangena	PF–ZAPU	Died 24 June 1982.	Sikajaya Andrew	PF–ZAPU	25 August 1982	
Matabeleland South	Akim Ndlovu	PF–ZAPU	Expelled 19 August 1982 for missing 21 consecutive sittings.	Missing			
Bulawayo North	Denis Walker	Rhodesian Front	Expelled 19 August 1982 for missing 21 consecutive sittings.	Guybon Cumming	Republican Front	18 January 1983.	
Mashonaland East	Missing			Joseph Jekanyika	ZANU–PF	18 January 1983	
Matabeleland South	Missing			Tamai Vivian Mpofu	ZAPU–PF	18 January 1983	
Makoni	Arthur Tapson	Rhodesian Front	Resigned 1983 to emigrate to South Africa.	Jock Kay	Independent	October 1983	
Lundi	Donald Goddard	Rhodesian Front	Died 1 January 1984. (Note: Goddard died in a fall over a waterfall.)	Peter Field	Independent	February 1984	
Mashonaland West	Josiah Chinamano	PF–ZAPU	Died 1 October 1984.	Kenneth Mano	PF–ZAPU	1985	
Masvingo	James Bassopo Moyo	ZANU–PF	Criminal conviction in October 1984.	Missing			
Matabeleland North	Jini Ntuta	PF–ZAPU	Died 19 November 1984.	Missing			
Western	Desmond Chalmers	Rhodesian Front	Resigned December 1984 after emigrating to the United Kingdom.	Missing			
