= Results of the 1980 Southern Rhodesian general election =

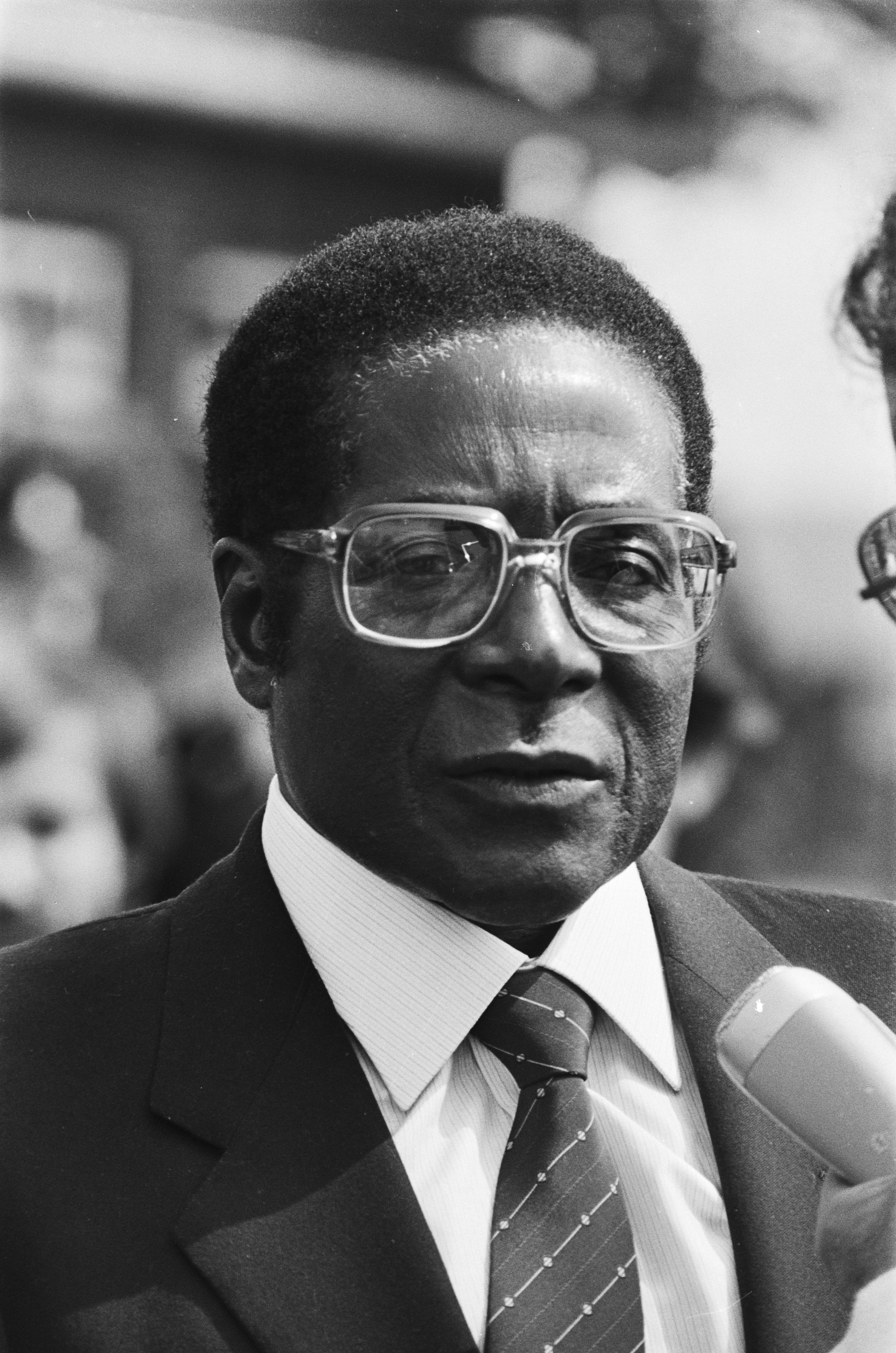
ZANU leader Robert Mugabe became Zimbabwe's first prime minister following the 1980 election.

Elections were held in Southern Rhodesia in February 1980 to set the membership of the House of Assembly of the first Parliament of the independent Zimbabwe. As stipulated by the new Constitution of Zimbabwe produced by the Lancaster House Conference, the new House of Assembly was to comprise 100 members, 80 of whom would be elected by all adult citizens on a common role, and 20 of whom would be elected by whites on a separate roll. The 80 common roll members were elected using a proportional representation system in which parties selected lists of candidates for each province. To qualify for seats in a province, a party needed to achieve a threshold of ten percent of the vote, and then the seats among the eligible parties were awarded proportionately. Nine parties contested the common roll seats, putting forward a total of 626 candidates. The 20 white roll members were elected in single-member constituencies.

The result was a victory for Robert Mugabe's Zimbabwe African National Union, contesting the election as ZANU–PF, which won 57 of the 80 common roll seats, giving it a majority in the 100-member House of Assembly. Joshua Nkomo's Zimbabwe African People's Union, contesting the election as the Patriotic Front, won 20 of the 80 common roll seats, with the remaining 3 going to Abel Muzorewa's United African National Council. Ian Smith's Rhodesian Front won all 20 of the white roll seats, with most of its candidates running unopposed. As a result of the election, Robert Mugabe became Zimbabwe's first prime minister upon the country's independence on 11 April 1980.

== Summary ==
Party	Common roll			White roll			Total seats
Party	Votes	%	Seats	Votes	%	Seats	Total seats
ZANU–PF	1,668,992	62.99	57				57
ZAPU	638,879	24.11	20				20
United African National Council	219,307	8.28	3				3
ZANU–Ndonga	53,343	2.01	0				0
Zimbabwe Democratic Party	28,181	1.06	0				0
National Front of Zimbabwe	18,794	0.71	0				0
National Democratic Union	15,056	0.57	0				0
Rhodesian Front				13,621	83.04	20	20
United National Federal Party	5,796	0.22	0				0
United People's Association of Matabeleland	1,181	0.04	0				0
Independents				2,781	16.96	0	0
Total	2,649,529	100.00	80	16,402	100.00	20	100
Valid votes	2,649,529	98.05					
Invalid/blank votes	52,746	1.95					
Total votes	2,702,275	100.00					
Registered voters/turnout				29,566	–		
Source: African Elections Database

== Common roll ==
Elected candidates are listed in bold.

=== Manicaland ===
Manicaland Province was allocated 11 seats in the House of Assembly in 1980.

NDU	NFZ	UANC	PF–ZAPU	ZANU–Ndonga	ZANU–PF	ZDP
Mark Muchabaiwa	Langton Mazaiwana	Edward Mazaiwana	John Gapara	Ndabaningi Sithole	Kumbirai Kangai	Alois Chinhamora
Langton Mazaiwana	Joyce Nxane	David Mukome	George Marange	Noel Mukono	Maurice Nyagumbo	Miles Marange
Tendai Shamu	Elsie Chapita	John Chirimbani	A. Chadzingwa	David Zamchiya	Didymus Mutasa	F. H. M. Hlatywayo
Benson Mufunde	Mbuso Sithole	Elijah Nyandoro	P. Makoni	Arnold Sawana	William Ndangana	Johnson Nyandoro
Shakespear Makoni	Mary Mutendeni	Maxwell Chambara	L. Dlakama	Oliver Saunyama	Frederick Shava	David Musanesa
Peter Tsungo	Christopher Mushonga	Lazarus Mtungwazi	T. Ngorima	Masipula Sithole	Victoria Chitepo	Alois Manyati
Nyikadzino Chiza	Paul Makoni	John Ruredzo	W. Dlamini	David Mungunyana	Naomi Nhiwatiwa	Francis Govera
Ambrose Makoni	Lushion Chimbanda	Benjamin Gwanzura	S. Chatsama	R. Murapa	Moven Mahachi	Denis Mlambo
Ephraim Chasarasara	Hudson Bonga	John Zvinoira	M. Masiyakurima	W. Nduku	T. Dube	Josephine Mkandi
Mary Mundopah	Dickson Tsika	Langton Charidza	O. Chibanda	N. M'tambara	Columbus Makoni	Andrew Siwela
Christopher Matsvaira	Lovemore Munyuki	Felix Kadzombe	S. Hhahla	Farai Mamvura	John Zvinoyera	Mischeck Nyabadza

=== Mashonaland Central ===
Mashonaland Central was allocated six seats in the House of Assembly in 1980.

NDU	NFZ	UANC	UNFP	PF–ZAPU	ZANU–Ndonga	ZANU–PF	ZDP
Fanuel Maruta	Mike Chikanda	Aaron Mutiti	Christopher Zhanje	Joseph Msika	Ephriam Tsvaringe	Edgar Tekere	Essiah Zhuwarara
James Shereni	Clive Murwira	Joshua Cohen	Marshall Mukono	P. Takundwa	B. Gambanga	Teurai Nhongo	Nofredge Mombemuriwo
William Murewerwi	Maxwell Wandawanda	Emmie Ncube	John Matonzi	T. Chimanikire	B. Muchenje	Sydney Sekeramayi	Claudius Kusema
Lovemore Tsangadzi	Clement Maroodza	Enock Chidavaenzi	Martin Gombe	A. Masawi	Freddie Dotito	Farai Masango	Job Negomo
Tadious Magwaro	Ernest Mazarura	Chris Mabharanga	James Eppie	J. Padzakashamba	Timothy Mufunga	Justin Mhlanga	Joseph Tendere
Paul Mavunga	Sheila Mabasa	Meshack Chagadama	Rufas Ruwaridzo	S. Kakora	Shadrick Chimanikire	Naison Muroiwa	Joseph Chigariro

=== Mashonaland East ===
Mashonaland East was allocated 16 seats in the House of Assembly in 1980.

NDU	NFZ	UANC	UNFP	PF–ZAPU	ZANU–Ndonga	ZANU–PF	ZDP
Henry Chihota	Chrispen Chitando	**Abel Muzorewa**	Ben Chanetsa	Josiah Chinamano	Joel Mandaza	**Robert Mugabe**	James Chikerema
Kingsley Muskwe	Albert Mutungi	**Silas Mundawarara**	George Chinyani	Felix Mafa Sibanda	Kesiwe Malindi	**Mark Dube**	Enoch Dumbutshena
Douglas Madamombe	Mike Gwande	Dennis Nyamuswa	Jackson Malindi	W. Musarurwa	Tobias Chizengeni	**Robert Marere**	Pius Wakatama
Lancelot Jero	Francis Nhamo	Simpson Mtambenengwe	John Masawi	D. Madzimbamuto	Douglas Mudzi	**Witness Mangwende**	Anania Chikandina
George Kunaka	Maxwell Moyo	Michael Mawema	Diamond Mugombeza	S. Marembo	John Kadzviti	**Moses Mvenge**	Davison Gomo
Chaka Mudzudzu	Charles Mvura	Abel Rumano	Mark Musara	E. Jirira	Elias Nyandoro	**Edson Shirihuru**	Patrick Makahamadze
Edward Tafirenyika	Mary Dube	Beatrice Mutasa	Kelvin Bakasa	K. Ndluni	Absolom Ndoro	**Edward Pswarayi**	Charles Zvimba
Archibold Muskwe	Clive Matenga	Farai Muzorewa	William Badza	S. Mutunyani	Wilfred Pasipanodya	**Grafton Ziyenge**	Paul Kunaka
Charles Mbirori	Jeffrey Moyo	Joseph Gopo	Overtone Zhakata	G. Musariri	Philip Foya	**Philemon Murambiwa**	Zebedia Gamanya
Argatha Madamombe	Tenson Mutandi	Gibson Magaramombe	Daisy Tafira	R. Nyandoro	R. Rutsito	**David Hunda**	Nelson Samkange
Sylvester Mapfuwi	Swinfren Muchenje	Chandaida Nyahwata	Peter Mutandwa	J. Chirisa	Chiremba Musambwa	**Horace Nyazika**	Edward Matiza
Marjorie Vera	Edward Mukamba	Avis Chikwanha	Mathew Charumbira	D. Katsande	Charles Manomano	**Godfrey Chidyausiku**	Naison Mukahadzi
Clifford Chiponda	Patrick Musarurwa	Naison Mtandi	Robert Kachindamoto	H. Malaba	Columbus Matanganyidze	**Simplisius Chihambakwe**	Cephas Chimutsa
Amos Nyandoro	Judith Fambisayi	Laicxon Kabaira	Justin Mupandaguta	T. V. Mpofu	James Chimwala	**Shadreck Rambanepasi**	Tafirenyika Takadiyi
Ingatius Chivunga	Solomon Mhike	David Mbidzo	Fidelis Nevanji	S. Bgoni	Evelyn Sithole	Elias Rusike	Wilfred Mabvakure
Rodreck Muswaka	Tabeth Jangire	Henry Mufanechiya	Henry Nyagomo	E. Patsike	Ephriam Sithole	John Jekanyika	Dorothy Nyere

=== Mashonaland West ===
Mashonaland West was allocated eight seats in the House of Assembly in 1980.

NDU	NFZ	UANC	PF–ZAPU	ZANU–Ndonga	ZANU–PF	ZDP
Xavier Mutenderi	Felix Kavande	**Titus Mukarati**	**Ariston Chambati**	Phileas Mhlanga	**Robson Manyika**	Stanlake Samkange
Moses Mani	Patrick Makoni	Canaan Chitate	Kenneth Mano	Nelson Bangajena	**Sally Mugabe**	Mhariwa Gumbo
Leonard Marufu	Clemence Pasipamire	Raymond Madzima	L. Chiwanza	Enock Machingauta	**Nathan Shamuyarira**	Simon Paraffin
Fabian Chikosha	Victor Muketiwa	Silas Kawonza	M. Nziramasanga	Peter Mombeshora	**A. Mudzingwa**	Tarcisius Madamombe
Palmer Muzowoneyi	James Ngondo	Josiah Mudzengi	K. Bhebe	Stephen Mariga	**Swethan Mombeshora**	Martin Hoyi
Beloved Mashoko	Austin Maririmba	Ronald Sadomba	C. Wedenhe	Jason Madiro	**Enos Chikowore**	Dickson Goromonzi
Pencil Mbizi	Buka Munyuki	Ismail Adam	C. Mashayamombe	Phabion Munyuki	Mudomeni Chivende	Paul Kutama
Saverio Nyakadzino	Nicolas Kamwana	Thompson Tsanangurai	M. Musarurwa	Steve Chinembiri	Noah Bangure	Gertrude Maseko

=== Matabeleland North ===
Matabeleland North Province was allocated 10 seats in the House of Assembly in 1980.

NDU	NFZ	UANC	UNFP	UPAM	PF–ZAPU	ZANU–Ndonga	ZANU–PF	ZDP
Levy Ndhlovu	Eric Zimuto	Ernest Bulle	Arnold Mpofu	Amon Dube	**Vote Moyo**	P. F. Sithole	**Herbert Ushewokunze**	Hospah Sibanda
Chance Sibanda	Norbet Tavengwa	Walter Mtimkhulu	E. M. Mnkandla	Adam Mlalazi	**D. Mangena**	Z. T. Chigumira	Canaan Banana	Bopoto Nyandoro
Sylvester Tigere	Frederick Sibanda	David Mutasa	Kenneth Ndebele	Lezly Phiri	**S. Malunga**	J. Ngaliwa	William Dube	Milton Mhlanga
Davie Chiweshe	Cornwell Ndhlovu	Morgan Machiya	Tito Tshuma	Elias Sithole	**J. Ntuta**	J. Ndebele	Nicholas Kitikiti	Freddy Jeka
Never Jack	Nicholas Chidavenzi	Gerald Mtimkhulu	Richard Gadlula	Violet Msimanga	**John Nkomo**	E. M. Ncube	Edward Chifamba	Ephraim Makwara
Ephraim Ngulube	Temba Chimanikire	Assam Ndanga	D. J. Madlala	Margaret Nyathi	**S. Sibanda**	Peter Musiyiwa	Lovemore Matipera	Lucia Muchenja
Joseph Sibanda	Dorothy Muratu	Pinus Matsheza	Assah Sibanda	Chenetsa Mpofu	**Ruth Chinamano**	Elias Dewa	Neville Shumba	Godfrey Madzvova
Billy Nyati	Wilfred Kambarami	Gladys Tiriboyi	Solomon Moyo	Emerly Mvundla	**Jane Ngwenya**	J. M. Mpofu	Togara Dangwa	Chrispen Jonias
Jonathan Langa	Ellias Mafukidze	Felix Pfavayi	Funeka Nyembezi	Dennis Moyo	**T. V. Lesabe**	Morrison Chongwe	Jacob Banda	Karikoga Chipere
Rupert Chitamba	Tandiwe Muzvidziwa	Ashton Makore	Sifelandi Ncube	Lydia Ngwenya	S. A. Mtanga	J. Ngarize	Edward Mangena	Stanley Mulumisa

=== Matabeleland South ===
Matabeleland South Province was allocated six seats in the House of Assembly in 1980.

NDU	NFZ	UANC	UNFP	UPAM	PF–ZAPU	ZANU–Ndonga	ZANU–PF	ZDP
Morris Ngulube	Milton Makaya	Joel Sigola	Zephaniah Bafanah	Lever Ncube	T. Silundika	Samson Dube	Enos Nkala	Archibald Ngcobo
David Chitumba	Keffas Tichana	Abraham Khumalo	Swithin Mtambo	Paul Nyoni	Stephen Nkomo	J. D. Moyo	Movern Ndhlovu	Gibias Hindoga
Hebert Mugugu	Anna Nyandoro	Peter Mpofu	Gideon Dewa	Million Mpofu	Edward Ndlovu	B. M. Ndhlovu	Mancama	Richard Nsimbi
Cleopas Mazibisa	Evelyn Ndhlovu	James Moyo	Juta Sitwala	Nanzi Maphosa	K. L. Dube	Stephen Mpofu	Sicino Dube	Simon Ncube
Kate Muzembe	Joseph Ndhlovu	Neviel Moyo	Lucky Songo	Fred Ngwenya	Callistus Ndlovu	J. Dewa	Beun Gapike	Giles Tshuma
Sarah Chatalka	Mischeck Chidavaenzi	Samuel Modhlani	Clean Makurani	Zefanya	E. Malandula	Luke Dube	Isaac Masunda	Agrippa Khumalo

=== Midlands ===
Midlands Province was allocated 12 seats in the House of Assembly in 1980.

NDU	NFZ	UANC	UNFP	PF–ZAPU	ZANU–Ndonga	ZANU–PF	ZDP
James Nyoni	Richard Madanire	Lovemore Mbanga	Endrew Hlongwane	**Joshua Nkomo**	James Dzvova	**Simon Muzenda**	Evelyn Shava
Shonga Chimutasha	Christopher Rambanapasi	Moses Tshuma	Staniglovsy Chifoore	**Clement Muchena**	Trynos Tangirai	**Ernest Kadungure**	Lamech Vuma
Imanuel Mhizha	Evans Mhizha	Joseph Bheka	Ntombizodwa Masuka	**Cephas Msipa**	William Kambasha	**Emmerson Mnangagwa**	Raymond Mgura
Nicholas Murapah	Christopher Nyoni	Louis Gumbo	Paul Mkwanzi	**William Kona**	Christopher Mutambisi	**Richard Hove**	David Chinho
Farare Tapfumaneyi	Isaac Nyakutsikwa	Edmund Macheka	Samuel Ngwenya	Clement Togwe	Moses Dera	**Simba Makoni**	David Motshoshoel
Joel Munetsi	Golden Takundwa	Mischeck Hove	Rabson Maposa	A. Njawaya	Amon Utedzi	**Simbarashe Mumbengegwi**	Constance Sibanda
Morris Muranda	Sylvester Bazvi	Simon Mukwapuna	David Chikuva	E. Hananda	Joseph Takawira	**Julia Zvobgo**	Morgan Ngwenya
Tadious Machingauta	Golden Mhizha	Sylvester Mutasa	Elizabeth Manyonda	S. Mtinsi	Aaron Mteru	**Exevier Matibenga**	Sylvester Ndhlovu
Welcome Chikari	Maggie Samanyanga	Wilson Mugabiri	Stephen Mwale	F. Mbengo	William M'teliso	Ignatius Chigwendere	J. Ziyambwa
Grace Mpuzi	Irine Madeya	John Kokera	William Banda	K. Mazendami	Faniwell Masoha	E.M. Nyashanu	Thomas Manasa
Idah Chinembiri	Oswell Chigede	Reuben Ndawana	Albert Ngena	Elija Moyo	Joseph Matewa	Kenneth Manyonda	Tariro Mutyandasvika
Patrick Mabumba	Euvencio Gwatimba	Jeffrey Manyeruke	Titus Gonongwe	S. Chilimanzi	Remingio Kunato	Justin Nyoka	Avednigo Mapeka

=== Victoria ===
Victoria Province (renamed Masvingo Province in 1982) was allocated 11 seats in the House of Assembly in 1980.

NDU	NFZ	UANC	PF–ZAPU	ZANU–Ndonga	ZANU–PF	ZDP
Munyengwa Chimuka	Peter Mandaza	Francis Zindonga	Samuel Munodawafa	L. M. R. Nyemba	Mayor Urimbo	Stanley Mugabe
Aaron Nyao	Samuel Gwarega	Herbert Zimuto	J. Dabulamanzi	E. Watungwa	Dzingai Mutumbuka	Atanasi Gwaza
Rosten Gore	Joseph Chikukwa	Smollie Mugudubi	E. Chimombe	J. Chimedza	Eddison Zvobgo	Alfred Svosve
Guy Charambura	Stephen Shumba	Benias Mugabe	T. Mhetu	S. Mangwengwe	Sheba Tavarwisa	Cephas Marozva
Stephen Mapiye	Gift Matora	Claudius Nhongohema	C. Mahlangu	V. Chikukutu	Nollan Makombe	Silvester Benji
Victor Muketiwa	Henry Hamadzirini	Jones Gondo	B. Shoko	J. Hlaisi	Simon Mazorodze	Sylvia Chaderopa
Philemon Chikandira	Mukudzei Mudzi	Christopher Sakala	Zinoti Moyo	Artwell Mashiri	Oliver Munyaradzi	Tembani Masuku
Killian Siwela	Chrispin Mandizvidza	Bernard Basera	D. K. Mutazu	N. Z. B. Dhlamini	James Bassopo-Moyo	Samuel Matiza
Christina Chiwashira	Henson Badza	Jerry Muchineripi	E. Maseko	Inos Charumbira	Nelson Mawema	Chipo Ngwaru
Karikoga Mpofu	Rabson Makombe	David Munandi	Daniel Gurajena	Francis Chibwe	Dzikamai Mavaire	Albert Makasi
Angelm Toga	Chipino Gurajena	Enos Mutseta	M. Marinda	V. T. Vudzijena	Albert Taderera	Simon Chirengwe

== White roll ==
The Rhodesian Front won all 20 white seats in the 1980 election.

Constituency	Candidate	Party	Votes	%
Avondale	John Landau	Rhodesian Front	unopposed	
Borrowdale	David Smith	Rhodesian Front	unopposed	
Bulawayo Central	Paddy Shields	Rhodesian Front	unopposed	
Bulawayo North	Denis Walker	Rhodesian Front	unopposed	
Bulawayo South	Wally Stuttaford	Rhodesian Front	3,715	92.0
Bulawayo South	Frank Bertrand	Independent	289	7.2
Bulawayo South	Ian Betch	Independent	36	0.9
Central	Rowan Cronjé	Rhodesian Front	unopposed	
Eastern	Des Butler	Rhodesian Front	unopposed	
Gatooma/Hartley	P. K. van der Byl	Rhodesian Front	unopposed	
Hatfield	Richard Cartwright	Rhodesian Front	unopposed	
Highlands	Robert Gaunt	Rhodesian Front	unopposed	
Kopje	Dennis Divaris	Rhodesian Front	1,999	65.5
Kopje	Timothy Stamps	Independent	1,053	34.5
Lundi	Donald Goddard	Rhodesian Front	unopposed	
Makoni	Arthur Tapson	Rhodesian Front	1,396	76.4
Makoni	Chris van der Merwe	Independent	431	23.6
Marlborough	Bill Irvine	Rhodesian Front	unopposed	
Mazoe/Mtoko	Andre Holland	Rhodesian Front	unopposed	
Midlands	Henry Elsworth	Rhodesian Front	unopposed	
Mount Pleasant	Chris Andersen	Rhodesian Front	2,683	79.4
Mount Pleasant	Nicholas McNally	Independent	698	20.6
Northern	Esmond Micklem	Rhodesian Front	unopposed	
Southern	Ian Smith	Rhodesian Front	2,253	93.8
Southern	Johannes Hulley	Independent	113	4.7
Southern	Donovan Speedie	Independent	37	1.5
Western	Alec Moseley	Rhodesian Front	1,579	92.7
Western	Lawrence Bronson	Independent	124	7.3
