= 2nd Parliament of Zimbabwe =

The 2nd Parliament of Zimbabwe began in 1985 and expired in 1990. The Parliament of Zimbabwe is composed of the Senate and the House of Assembly. The 2nd Parliament's membership was set by the 1985 election, which gave ZANU–PF a nearly two-thirds majority, with PF–ZAPU taking most of the remaining seats. Of the 20 seats reserved for whites, 15 were held by the Conservative Alliance of Zimbabwe, with the moderate Independent Zimbabwe Group all but one of the remaining five seats.

== Key ==
Party	Abbreviation
Zimbabwe African National Union – Patriotic Front	ZANU–PF
Patriotic Front – Zimbabwe African People's Union	PF–ZAPU
Conservative Alliance of Zimbabwe	CAZ
Independent Zimbabwe Group	IZG
Zimbabwe African National Union – Ndonga	ZANU–Ndonga
Independent	Ind.

== House of Assembly ==
=== Common roll ===
Most of the elected MPs for ZAPU joined ZANU–PF in 1987 as a result of the Unity Accord, which merged the two parties.

Constituency	Name	Party
Manicaland Province
Buhera North	Kenneth Manyonda	ZANU–PF
Buhera South	Kumbirai Kangai	ZANU–PF
Chimanimani	Simon Musutani Sithole	ZANU–PF
Chipinge	Goodson Sithole	ZANU–Ndonga
Makoni East	Naomi Nhiwatiwa	ZANU–PF
Makoni West	Moven Mahachi	ZANU–PF
Mutare East	Lazarus Nzarayebani	ZANU–PF
Mutare Urban	Edgar Tekere	ZANU–PF
Mutare West	Moton Malianga	ZANU–PF
Mutasa	Victoria Chitepo	ZANU–PF
Nyanga	Chimbidzayi Sanyangare	ZANU–PF
Mashonaland Central Province
Bindura–Shamva	Joice Mujuru	ZANU–PF
Darwin	George Rutanhirae	ZANU–PF
Guruve	Rackson Mucheki	ZANU–PF
Mazowe	Chenhanho Chimutengwende	ZANU–PF
Rushinga	Paddington Zvorwadza	ZANU–PF
Mashonaland East Province
Chinamora	Herbert Ushewokunze	ZANU–PF
Chitungwiza	Witness Mangwende	ZANU–PF
Dzivarasekwa	Maurice Nyagumbo	ZANU–PF
Glen View	Idah Mashonganyika	ZANU–PF
Goromonzi	Kenneth Bute	ZANU–PF
Harare	Bernard Chidzero	ZANU–PF
Highfield	Robert Mugabe	ZANU–PF
Manyame	Robert Marere	ZANU–PF
Marondera	Sydney Sekeramayi	ZANU–PF
Mbare	Edward Pswarayi	ZANU–PF
Mudzi	Abraham Kabasa	ZANU–PF
Mufakose	John Zhakata	ZANU–PF
Mukuvusi	Amos Midzi	ZANU–PF
Murewa North	Rudo Mungwashu	ZANU–PF
Murewa South	David Karimanzira	ZANU–PF
Mutoko	Richard Katsande	ZANU–PF
Wedza	Joseph Jekanyika	ZANU–PF
Zengeza	John Madzinga	ZANU–PF
Mashonaland West Province
Chegutu East	Mudzingwa Kadenhe	ZANU–PF
Chegutu West	Enos Chikowore	ZANU–PF
Kadoma	Charles Ndhlovu	ZANU–PF
Kariba	Kenneth Mano	PF–ZAPU
Karoi	Edgar Kwenda	ZANU–PF
Makonde East	Sabina Mugabe	ZANU–PF
Makonde North	Swithun Mombeshora	ZANU–PF
Makonde West	Nathan Shamuyarira	ZANU–PF
Masvingo Province
Bikita	Gabriel Machinga	ZANU–PF
Chiredzi North	Henry Pote	ZANU–PF
Chiredzi South	Titus Maluleke	ZANU–PF
Chivi	Josaya Hungwe	ZANU–PF
Gutu North	Oliver Munyaradzi	ZANU–PF
Gutu South	Shuvai Mahofa	ZANU–PF
Masvingo North	Dzingai Mutumbuka	ZANU–PF
Masvingo South	Eddison Zvobgo	ZANU–PF
Mwenezi	Justin Machava	ZANU–PF
Ndanga East	Simbi Mubako	ZANU–PF
Ndanga–Zimuto	Mayor Urimbo	ZANU–PF
Matabeleland North Province
Binga	Francis Munkombwe	PF–ZAPU
Bulawayo	Lot Senda	PF–ZAPU
Hwange–Tsholotsho	David Kwidini	PF–ZAPU (before 1986)
Hwange–Tsholotsho	David Kwidini	ZANU–PF (after 1986)
Lupane	Micah Bhebe	PF–ZAPU
Magwegwe	Joshua Nkomo	PF–ZAPU
Mpopoma	Sydney Malunga	PF–ZAPU
Nkayi	Welshman Mabhena	PF–ZAPU
Nyamandhlovu	John Nkomo	PF–ZAPU
Pelandaba	Joseph Msika	PF–ZAPU
Matabeleland South Province
Beitbridge	Kembo Mohadi	PF–ZAPU
Bulalima–Mangwe	Isaac Nyathi	PF–ZAPU
Gwanda	Edward Ndlovu	PF–ZAPU
Insiza	Naison Ndlovu	PF–ZAPU
Matobo	Stephen Nkomo	PF–ZAPU
Mzingwane	Thenjiwe Lesabe	PF–ZAPU
Midlands Province
Charter East	Ernest Kadungure	ZANU–PF
Chirumanzu	Frederick Shava	ZANU–PF
Gokwe East	Byron Hove	ZANU–PF
Gokwe West	Jesiniahs Makanganise	ZANU–PF
Gweru Rural	Ernest Tongogara	ZANU–PF
Gweru Urban	Simon Muzenda	ZANU–PF
Kwekwe East	Emmerson Mnangagwa	ZANU–PF
Kwekwe West	Josiah Chinyati	ZANU–PF
Mberengwa North	Richard Hove	ZANU–PF
Mberengwa South	Ben Matanga	ZANU–PF
Shurugwi	Simbarashe Mumbengegwi	ZANU–PF
Zvishavane	Julia Tukai Zvobgo	ZANU–PF

=== White roll ===
The following were the members elected on the white roll for the 20 seats in Parliament reserved for whites. In September 1987, having achieved the support of 75% of the House of Assembly as required under the Lancaster House Agreement, the constitution was amended to abolish the white roll constituencies. Twenty further members (including many of the former white MPs who were supportive of ZANU–PF) were co-opted onto the House of Assembly to replace them.

Constituency	Name	Party
Avondale	John Landau	IZG (before 1987)
Avondale	John Landau	ZANU–PF (after 1987)
Borrowdale	Tony Read	IZG
Bulawayo Central	Ian Smith	CAZ
Bulawayo North	Guybon Cumming	CAZ
Bulawayo South	Graham Biffen	CAZ
Central	Tony Berkhout	CAZ
Eastern	Desmond Butler	CAZ
Hatfield	Dennis Johnson	CAZ
Highlands	Charles Duke	CAZ (before 1986)
Highlands	Charles Duke	ZANU–PF (after 1986)
Kadoma–Chegutu	Gerald Smith	CAZ
Kopje	Shaw Dyson	CAZ
Makoni	Jock Kay	IZG (before 1987)
Makoni	Jock Kay	ZANU–PF (after 1987)
Marlborough	William Irvine	IZG
Mazowe–Mutoko	Mark Partridge	CAZ
Midlands	Vernon Tapson	CAZ
Northern	Bertram Ankers	CAZ
Mount Pleasant	Chris Andersen	Ind. (before 1987)
Mount Pleasant	Chris Andersen	ZANU–PF (after 1987)
Runde	Johan Christiaan Welman	CAZ
Southern	David Clive Mitchell	CAZ
Western	Stephen Locke	CAZ
