= National Heroes' Acre (Zimbabwe) =

Cemetery in Zimbabwe

Coordinates: 17°50′04″S 30°59′14″E

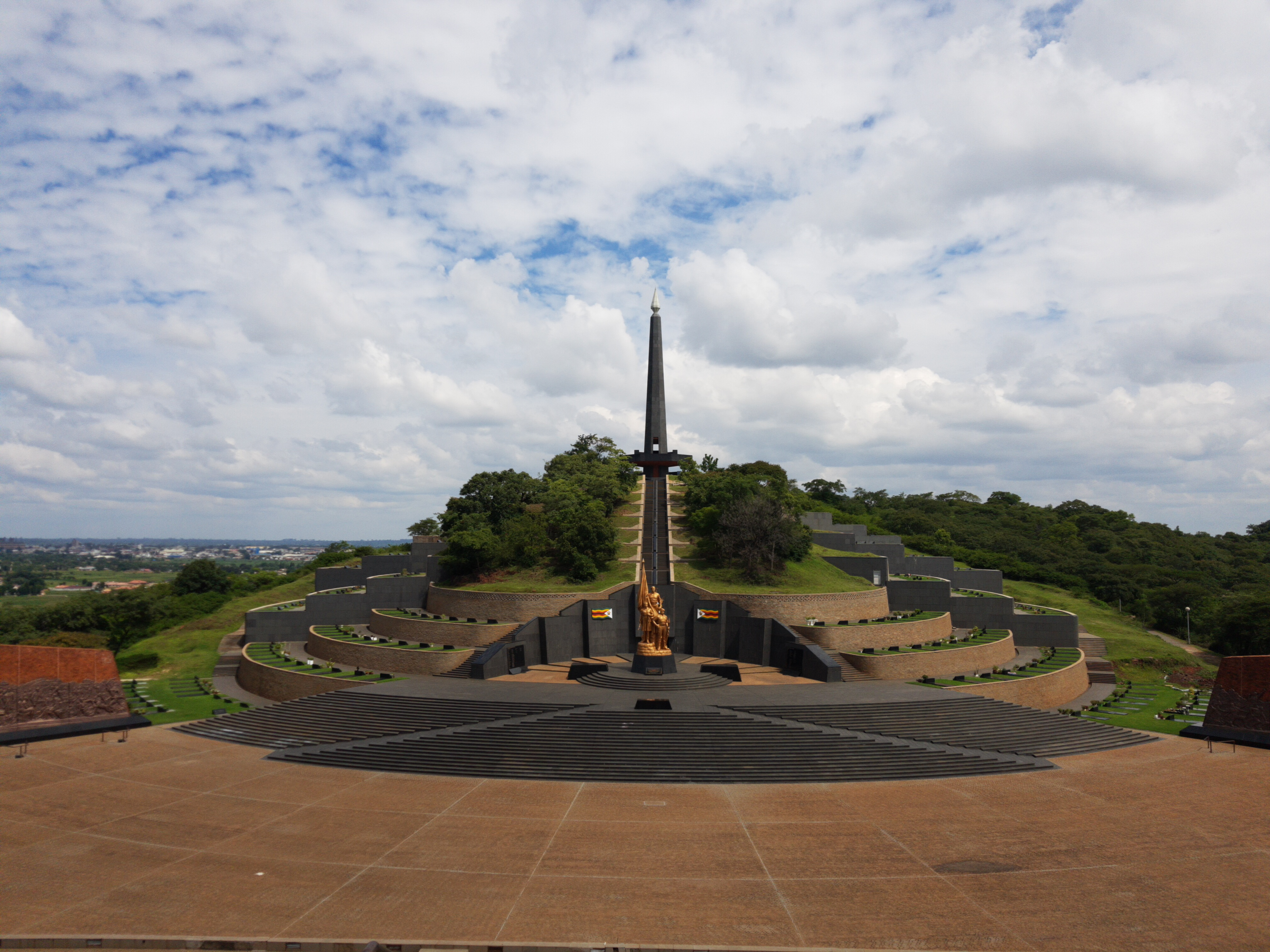
The National Heroes' Acre from the front

National Heroes' Acre or simply Heroes' Acre is a burial ground and national monument in Harare, Zimbabwe. The 23-hectare (57-acre) site is situated on a ridge seven kilometres from Harare, towards Norton. Its stated purpose is to commemorate Patriotic Front guerrillas killed during the Rhodesian Bush War, and contemporary Zimbabweans whose dedication or commitment to their country justify their interment at the shrine. People buried here are considered heroes by the incumbent Zimbabwe African National Union – Patriotic Front regime, which has administered the country since independence at 1980. Indeed, most of the recipients of the 'hero status' were known to be Zanu-PF sympathisers.

The actual monument itself is modeled after two AK-47s lying back-to-back; the graves are meant to resemble their magazines. It closely mirrors the design of the Revolutionary Martyrs' Cemetery in Taesŏng-guyŏk, just outside Pyongyang, North Korea.

The monument is an early example of work of the North Korean firm Mansudae Overseas Projects, which went on to construct a similar cemetery in Namibia, Heroes' Acre.

== Construction ==
Work was initiated on the National Heroes' Acre in September 1981, a year after Zimbabwean independence. Ten Zimbabwean and seven North Korean architects and artists were recruited to map the site's layout. 250 local workers were involved in the project at the height of its construction. Black granite used for the main structures was quarried from Mutoko, about 140 kilometres northeast of the capital, then known as Salisbury. The cemetery was completed in 1982.

=== National Heroes ===
Those heroes subordinated their personal interests to the collective interest of Zimbabwe. They accepted and endured pain, suffering and brutality with fortitude even unto death.

National Hero Status is the highest honour that can be conferred to an individual by Zimbabwe and the recipient is entitled to be buried at the National Heroes' Acre. As of 7 August 2001, 47 persons had been interred on site, rising to 161 by November 2022.

== Features ==
=== The Tomb of the Unknown Soldier ===
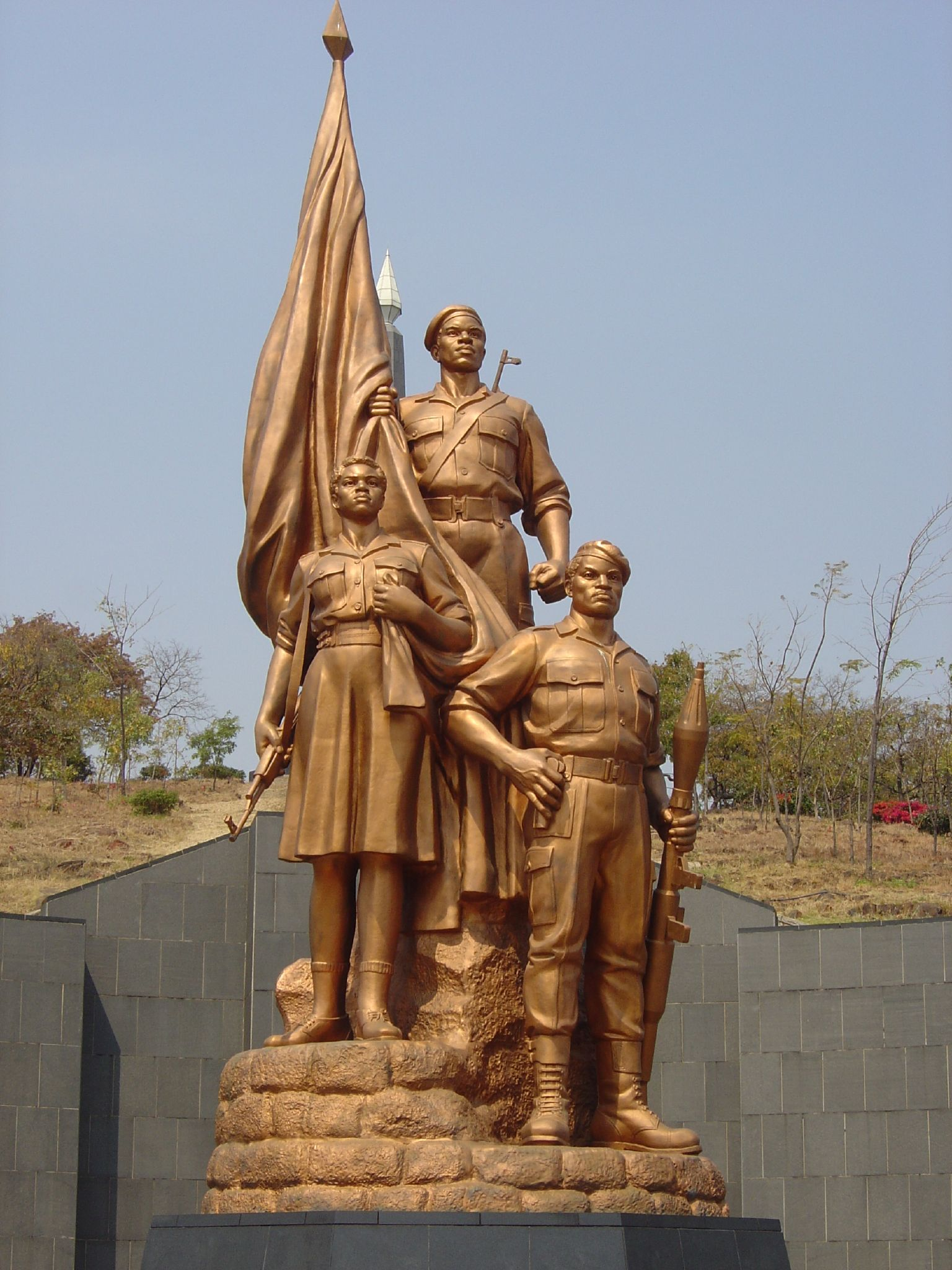
The statue of the unknown soldier

The Tomb of the Unknown Soldier recognises unidentified insurgents who lost their lives during the liberation war. Included is a bronze statue of three guerrillas – one female, two male – a flagpole, and an ornate artifice.

=== The Eternal Flame ===
The Eternal Flame rests atop a tower measuring some forty metres. It was lit at independence celebrations in 1982 and embodies the spirit of Zimbabwean independence. The tower is the highest point at Heroes' Acre; it can readily be viewed from Harare.

=== Wall murals ===
Two walls on either side of the monument carry murals depicting the history of Zimbabwe, from pre-colonial times through the Chimurenga, the Rhodesian Bush War, and independence under national hero Robert Mugabe.

=== Museum ===
Near the entrance of Heroes' Acre is a museum dedicated to the rise of African nationalism in Zimbabwe and the anti-colonial struggle, showcasing artifacts, photographs, documents and other paraphernalia from the war and the period shortly after independence Zimbabwe National heroes buried at the shrine.

== Burials ==
1. Cephas Cele
2. Oliver Mtukudzi
3. Felix Ngwarati Muchemwa
4. Sabina Mugabe
5. Edgar Tekere
6. Samuel Mamutse
7. Lameck Makanda
8. Daniel Nyamayaro Madzimbamuto
9. Stanford Shamu
10. Joshua Nkomo
11. Simon Mazorodze
12. Josiah Tongogara
13. Sally Mugabe
14. Jason Moyo
15. Alfred Nikita Mangena
16. Herbert Chitepo
17. Leopold Takawira
18. Masotsha Ndlovu
19. George Silundika
20. Johanna Mafuyana
21. Major General Charles Njodzi Dauramanzi
22. Edson Jonasi Mudadirwa Zvobgo
23. Julia Tukai Zvobgo
24. Simon Vengai Muzenda
25. Lookout Masuku
26. Herbert Ushewokunze
27. Moven Mahachi
28. Ernest R. Kadungure
29. Sydney Donald Malunga
30. Joseph Culverwell
31. Solomon Mujuru
32. Brig. General John Zingoni
33. Josiah Tungamirai
34. Brigadier General Charles Tigwe Gumbo
35. Zororo Duri
36. Christopher Machingura Ushewokunze
37. Sikwili Kohli Moyo
38. Vitalis Zvinavashe
39. Chenjerai Hunzvi
40. Border Gezi
41. Robson Manyika
42. Josiah Mushore Chinamano
43. Swithun Mombeshora
44. Maurice Nyagumbo
45. Bernard Chidzero
46. Ambassador Lloyd Gundu
47. Elliot Manyika
48. David Karimanzira
49. Livingstone Mernard Negidi Muzariri
50. Brig. Gen. Armstrong Gunda
51. Misheck Chando
52. Guy Clutton-Brock
53. John Nkomo
54. Herbert Mahlaba
55. Lt. Gen. Amoth Chingombe
56. Edson Ncube
57. Elias Kanengoni
58. Nathan Shamuyarira
59. Kantibhai Gordanbhai
60. George Lifa (Maj.Gen)
61. Cornelius Nhloko
62. Lieutenant Colonel Harold Chirenda
63. Mike Tichafa Karakadzai
64. sn:Kumbirai Kangai
65. Enos Nkala
66. Solomon Chirume Tawengwa
67. George Bodzo Nyandoro
68. Joseph Msika
69. Witness Mangwende
70. Gary Settled Tamayi Hlomayi Magadzire
71. Vivian Mwashita
72. Victoria Chitepo
73. Charles Utete
74. Cephas Msipa
75. Peter Chanetsa
76. Shuvai Mahofa
77. Stanley Gagisa Nleya
78. Major General Trust Mugoba
79. Sibusiso Moyo
80. Perence Shiri
81. Thokozile Mathuthu
82. Douglas Nyikayaramba
83. Biggie Joel Matiza
84. Brigadier General Epmarcus Walter Kanhanga
85. Kantibhai Patel
86. Colonel Kenny “Ridzai” Constantine Mabuya
87. Timothy Stamps
