= Chinamano =

Chinamano is a Zimbabwean surname. Notable people with the surname include:

- Josiah Chinamano, Zimbabwean politician
- Ruth Chinamano, Zimbabwean politician
