= Paul Tangi Mhova Mkondo =

Zimbabwean nationalist (1945–2013)

Paul Tangi Mhova Mkondo (MK)
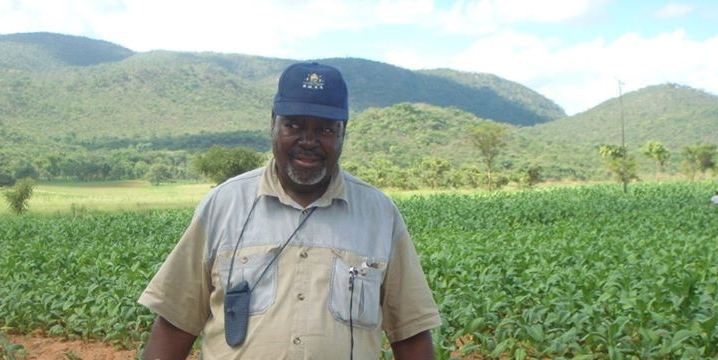

ZANU PF Treasurer Mufakose Constituency
- In office 1980–1996

ZANU Treasurer (Internal)
- In office 1972–1980
- Preceded by: Enos Nkala
- Succeeded by: Emmerson Mnangagwa

Constitutional Commission of Zimbabwe, Deputy Chairman of Mashonaland Central
- In office 21 May 1999 – 20 February 2000

Personal details
- Born: Paul Mkondo; 23 December 1945 Zimbabwe Fort Victoria, Southern Rhodesia (now Masvingo, Zimbabwe)
- Died: 9 May 2013 (aged 67) Zimbabwe Avenues Private Hospital, Harare Zimbabwe,
- Resting place: Toma Village, Chief Svosve, Hwedza, Mashonaland East. 18.6167°S 31.5667°E Zimbabwe
- Party: ZANU PF
- Spouse: Maud Mkondo (m. 1968) Machiridza Tekere
- Children: 4: 2 sons (Nhamo Mkondo and Tariro Mkondo); 2 daughters (Vongai and Tumai)
- Education: Chemanza Mission School, Wedza, Mashonaland East; Tegwani Mission (now Thekwane High School, Bulilimamangwe, Matabeleland South.
- Alma mater: University of Zimbabwe, Keele University, University of Southern California
- Occupation: Businessman, Philanthropist, Philosopher, Nationalist, Farmer, Police (Sergeant Major-Reserve), Conservationist, Academic, Entertainment Promoter
- Known for: Financial Insurance Guru (Paul Mkondo Insurance) & Real Estate (Paul Mkondo Agency - PMA) as advertised and broadcast. Transport Business (Sharaude), Import & Export (Nhavota Enterprises). Nationalist, part of the first group of Gonakudzingwa restriction camp political prisoners, Black Economic Empowerment, Indigenous Commercial Farming, International Music Concerts Promotion, Club HideOut 99 Owner, Philanthropy & Entrepreneur
- Website: http://pmib.pmibinsbrokers.com/

Paul Tangi Mhova Mkondo (23 December 1945 – 9 May 2013) was a Zimbabwean nationalist who was part of the first group of Gonakudzingwa restriction camp political prisoners. He was also a pioneer insurance executive, business magnate, academic, philanthropist, conservationist, pioneer Indigenous businessman and entrepreneur.

== Early life ==
Mkondo was born of Karanga and Lemba heritage of the Shiri Hungwe Clan in 1945 in Fort Victoria, (now Masvingo). His Paternal Grandmother was a daughter of Chief Zimuto, one of the Ancient Royal Traditional Chieftainship from Masvingo. He was the third-born in a family of 18 children, and he was the second son of Tangi Mkondo. Paul grew up in Nerupiri Village in Gutu a district of Masvingo Province. He later moved with his father Tangi Mhova Mkondo, who was a farm manager, to Schoora Estate in Marandellas (now Marondera) in Mashonaland East Province.

== Education and training ==
Mkondo did his Grade 1 to Grade 3 at Schoora Estate Primary School. After Grade 3, Mkondo moved to another farm in Wedza, which became known as Edridge (Duva) Estate, he worked as a stable boy looking after horses, later becoming the butler. During this time, his father Tangi Mhova Mkondo joined fellow migrants recruited by Witswatersrand Native Labour Association (WNLA/ WENELA) to work in the gold mines of Johannesburg, South Africa. This was in order to pay for the controversial hut tax imposed upon black Rhodesians by the colonial government, as traditional subsistence farming did not generate enough income to afford the tax. Mkondo had to work to support his mother and the rest of his siblings at a very young age. During the weekend he started weekend business of trading at the local market. He later went to the Chemhanza Mission in Wedza, a district of the Mashonaland East Province in 1957 to complete his primary education from Grade 4 to Grade 7. Mkondo then went to high school at the Tegwani Mission near Bulawayo in the Matabeleland South Province. At Tegwani Mission (now Thekwane High School), he met his fellow nationalists such as Canaan Banana and Edson Zvobgo. Mkondo was also classmates with union leader Gibson Sibanda. Mkondo led the biggest student protest against the Rhodesian Unilateral Declaration of Independence (UDI) in 1965. This resulted in him being black-listed and outlawed, resulting in him being one of the first political detainees at Gonakudzingwa Restriction camp alongside Joshua Nkomo. Mkondo, during summer, used to enjoy the Outward-Bound Camps, which were held at the Outward Bound Mountaineering Centre in Melsetter (now Chimanimani) in the Manicaland Province. He became a part-time instructor which helped him pay his Secondary Education. Mkondo during this time also trained individuals on bushcraft, scouting, and how to survive in the forest.

Mkondo went on to become a full-time "Outward Bound Instructor" where he trained another future nationalist, Moven Mahachi, who later planned the escape of Robert Mugabe and Tezvara (In-Law) Edgar Tekere to Mozambique, alongside Chief Rekayi Tangwena (whom he had befriended as an Outward Bound instructor) with the assistance of Samora Machel's FRELIMO party. After a few years as an Outward-bound Instructor and Scout in the Eastern Highlands, Mkondo decided to continue his education. He enrolled at Bulawayo Polytechnic College to train in hotel catering, a course that was sponsored by the Rhodesian Breweries (Natbrew) and Anglo American Corporation. He was one of two black students accepted at the time for this course. The student who achieved the highest marks was to be offered a scholarship to study for a Bachelor of Science degree in Hotel Management at Blackpool Technical College (now Blackpool and The Fylde College) in the United Kingdom. Mkondo came first among the other students in the course, but was not offered the scholarship because of his colour. This was his first personal taste of racial discrimination, as he believed the scholarship was a lifetime opportunity to help him provide for his family. Mkondo then relocated to Highfields Harare, obtaining a job with the prestigious Park Lane Hotel in Salisbury as an assistant kitchen manager. Due to an altercation with some soldiers at a wedding, Mkondo was fired and later barred from future employment at any catering establishment. He sought out another job at Salisbury's Federal Hotel, but again cited discrimination by the predominantly Coloured guests.

== Entrepreneurship ==
Mkondo decided to open his own business in Lochinvar and purchased the Club Hideout 99 with approval from the Rhodesian Liquor Licensing Board and the municipal authorities. This site later became an important meeting site for supporters of the Zimbabwe African National Union (ZANU), and stored weapons for the party's militant wing, the Zimbabwe African National Liberation Army (ZANLA). Mkondo also participated in a series of urban bombings, such as the sabotage of petrol installations in Epworth. Throughout the 1960s, he worked as an insurance & financial advisor. His business acumen and strong work ethic made him start a garage and taxi business in Machipisa, Highfields. Mkondo eventually founded his own taxi company, Sharaude Glen Noah Taxi Services (Pvt) Ltd, which came to own the second largest taxi fleet in Rhodesia. At some point he also served as president of the country's Metered Taxi Operators' Association.

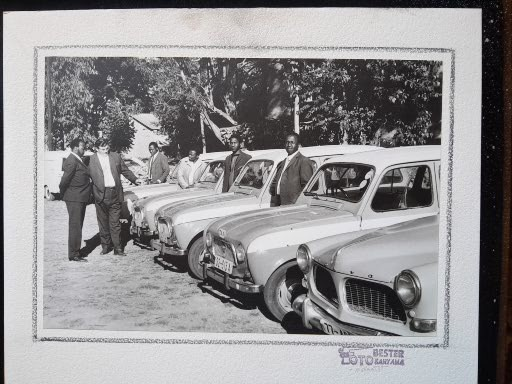
Paul Tangi Mhova Mkondo's Sharaude Taxi Fleet Ceremony on 3 June 1972

== Political activity ==
Radio DJ Webster Shamu Interviewing Indigenous Business Magnates Paul Tangi Mhova Mkondo and Isaac Hanzi Samuriwo

Mkondo organised underground meetings for some of the political leadership, as many were his former teachers and colleagues from Thekwani High School in Plumtree. Some he had known since he had lived with them in Highfields Township in Salisbury (now Harare). Following the election of Mugabe as prime minister in March 1980, Mkondo helped many former guerrilla fighters re-integrate into civilian life. Mkondo was the favored candidate to represent Zanu for the Gutu South parliamentary seat in the Masvingo Province, where he was born and raised. Instead, Shuvai Mahofa due to gender equality issues was selected by the Gutu Zanu Provincial leadership led by Vice President of Zimbabwe, Dr. Simon Muzenda, which Mkondo cordially accepted and then fully supported her tenure, as she was a Clans woman (VaTete) and an able politician. Mkondo, in terms of international business, turned down many executive opportunities to work in Fortune 500 and FTSE 100 Index multi-national companies overseas, opting to remain in Zimbabwe.

== Indigenous commercial farming ==
Paul Mkondo was an established commercial farmer. He started farming Zimbabwe's staple maize in the late 1970s in Lochinvar and Southerton in Harare. He also was the first indigenous commercial poultry farmer to have his own brand, titled Paul Mkondo Poultry. In the mid-1980s, Mkondo purchased Inyatsi Farm at competitive commercial agricultural property market rates at that time from a white farmer in the Mazowe-Mashonaland Central area. He joined the Commercial Farmers' Union (CFU), and was one of the founding members of the Indigenous Commercial Farmers Union (ICFU), formed in 1992 to represent black commercial farmers.

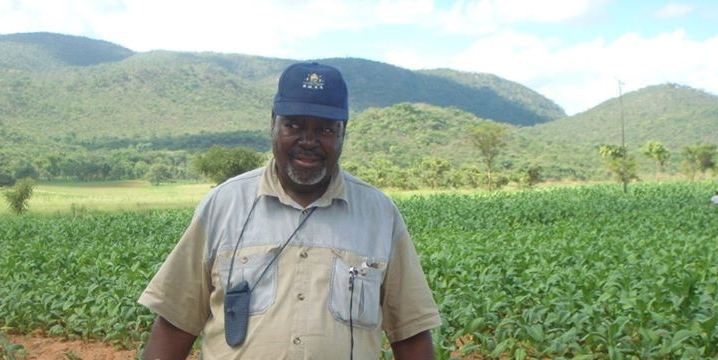
Paul Mkondo in tobacco fields on his Commercial farm in Mazowe, Mashonaland Central

Mkondo, was the Vice-president for the Affirmative Action of the IBDC organization, he was also a founding father of the indigenization and black economic empowerment of the Zimbabwean economy alongside similar business moguls such as Ben Mucheche (President), John Mapondera (Former President), Strive Masiyiwa, Chemist Siziba (former president), Jane Mutasa (IBWO), and James Makamba. This group worked on indigenization laws with the support of the President Robert Mugabe, and the Vice-presidents Simon Muzenda and Joshua Nkomo, the group formed the basis of the Indigenization and Economic Empowerment Act of 2007.

== Death ==
Mkondo was in the intensive care unit post-surgery for a month whilst waiting for his multi-disciplinary international medical consultants to medically air transport him to the Milpark Hospital for stabilization in South Africa, but their efforts were delayed by the local team. Mkondo died on 9 May 2013, in a Harare private hospital titled Avenues Clinic in Zimbabwe.

== Legacy ==
Paul Mkondo was the first African insurance executive and financial advisor to be recognized with the elite Life Million Dollar Roundtable International (MDRT). In the independent Zimbabwe he officially represented Zimbabwe and presented the new flag to the MDRT Organization with the blessings of the first Prime Minister of Zimbabwe H. E. Robert Mugabe, nicknamed Jongwe. He was also on the MDRT standing committee. Mkondo was the first African President of the Life underwriters' association.

Mkondo and VaMutanga were the first pioneering African Indigenous Businessmen in Rhodesia to establish a licensed Restaurant and Night Club backed by Amai Mutanga's Blessing.

Mkondo was also the First African International Music Promoter in the Highfields in the 60s.

Mkondo was one of the main principal founders of the CBZ bank.

Mkondo turned down a Cabinet Post & also an Ambassadorial role in Robert Mugabe's first Cabinet & Government in independent Zimbabwe for his very high risk role as a Financier, Guarantor & Internal Treasurer of ZANU during the liberation struggle.

The protagonist Simbai Saul Muhondo, in Samuel Chimsoro's novel Nothing is impossible is based on Mkondo's biography (the period from Mkondo's Birth to 1983, (when the book was also published). The book was well received and became part of the national education syllabus in English literature during the 80's.

Political offices
Preceded by Enos Nkala	Treasurer (Dura ReMusangano) ZANU	Next: Emmerson Mnangagwa
