= Herbert Chitepo =

Zimbabwean politician

Herbert Wiltshire Pfumaindini Chitepo

Leader of Zimbabwe African National Union
- In office July 1963 – 18 March 1975
- President: Ndabaningi Sithole
- Vice President: Leopold Takawira
- Lieutenant: Josiah Tongogara
- Preceded by: Post established
- Succeeded by: Robert Mugabe

Personal details
- Born: Herbert Wiltshire Pfumaindini Chitepo; 15 June 1923 Watsomba, Nyanga District, Southern Rhodesia (now Zimbabwe)
- Died: 18 March 1975 (aged 51) Lusaka, Zambia
- Cause of death: Assassination by car bomb
- Resting place: National Heroes' Acre, Harare, Zimbabwe
- Party: ZANU
- Spouse: Victoria Fikile Chitepo
- Relations: Edgar Tekere
- Education: University of Fort Hare
- Occupation: Barrister; Nationalist politician
- Awards: Zimbabwe National Hero

Military service
- Allegiance: ZANLA
- Years of service: 1962–1975
- Commands: ZANLA

Herbert Wiltshire Pfumaindini Chitepo (15 June 1923 – 18 March 1975) was a Zimbabwean lawyer, politician, and nationalist leader who led the Zimbabwe African National Union (ZANU) until his assassination in 1975.

Although his assailant remains unidentified, the Rhodesian author Peter Stiff says that a former soldier of the British Special Air Service (SAS), Hugh Hind, was responsible.

Chitepo was the first black citizen of Rhodesia to become a barrister.

== Early years ==
Herbert Wiltshire Pfumaindini Chitepo was born in Watsomba village in the Mutasa District of Southern Rhodesia, now Zimbabwe on 15 June 1923. His family came from the Manyika clan (Samanyika) of the Shona people. He was educated at St David's Mission School, Bonda, St Augustine's School, Penhalonga and then at Adams College, Natal, South Africa, where he qualified as a teacher in 1945. This was where he met Victoria Mahamba-Sithole, a South African whom he married in 1955.

== Early career ==
After teaching for a year, he resumed his studies to graduate with a Bachelor of Arts from Fort Hare University College in 1949. He qualified as a barrister-at-law, and was called to the bar by Gray's Inn. He was a research assistant at the School of Oriental and African Studies. He was the first African in Southern Rhodesia to qualify as a barrister. In 1954, Chitepo became Rhodesia's second black lawyer after Prince Nguboyenja Khumalo son of King Lobengula (a special law was required to allow him to occupy chambers with white colleagues). On returning to Rhodesia in 1954, he practised as a lawyer and defended African nationalists such as Ndabaningi Sithole in court. In February 1960, he travelled to the US with support from the African-American Institute. In 1961, he served as legal adviser to Joshua Nkomo, founder of the Zimbabwe African Peoples Union (ZAPU), at the Southern Rhodesia Constitutional Conference in London. In the same year, he was also appointed to the board of governors of Bernard Mizeki College along with Sir. W. C .R. Honey and Sir Robert Tredgold. The Southern Rhodesian government did not detain him, as he did not come out in the open as an official of the nationalist movement, and the regime also feared that he was too internationally well known to be locked up.

== ZANU ==
In May 1962 ZAPU was banned because of militarism and Chitepo was persuaded to go into voluntary exile to escape possible detention. He became Tanganyika's first African director of public prosecutions. The Ndabaningi Sithole and Joshua Nkomo factions of ZAPU split apart in July 1963. Nkomo's supporters founded the PCC-ZAPU (later just called ZAPU again) and favoured a more militaristic approach. As the more moderate faction, Chitepo sided with Sithole and was elected chairman of ZANU (having defeated Nathan Shamuyarira) from its foundation. He held this post until 7 December 1974, when the Lusaka Accord was signed.

Both parties vied for domination but in 1964 both were banned and the leaders were all arrested. Both parties chose to leave the country and reorganise and form armies from outside Rhodesian borders, although they chose different countries to make their base. ZAPU based itself in the West and Zambia where it organised ZIPRA (the Zimbabwe People's Revolutionary Army.) They allied with the Soviet Union and organised a vanguard of highly trained soldiers. ZANU, however, moved into Tanzania and then to Mozambique and set up ZANLA (Zimbabwe African National Liberation Army) which concentrated more on mobilising the masses in the countryside in a method pioneered by the Chinese.

In January 1966 Chitepo resigned as director of Public Prosecutions and moved to Zambia to concentrate on the armed struggle. He toured world capitals canvassing support for ZANU and for the enforcement of total economic sanctions against Rhodesia. With his friendly disposition, he was very effective and earned for ZANU international recognition and respect.

Sithole and others prepared a comprehensive document giving powers to Chitepo to lead ZANU while Rev. Sithole was in detention and specifically authorising him to carry out the armed struggle. Accordingly, Herbert Chitepo with the military supremo Josiah Tongogara from the Karanga ethnic community, organised and planned successful military guerilla attacks and underground activities in Rhodesia from 1966 onwards. In 1972, he coordinated war operations with FRELIMO and opened up the northeastern region of Zimbabwe as a new and effective war front.

== Death ==
Chitepo was killed on 18 March 1975 in Lusaka, Zambia, when a car bomb, placed in his Volkswagen Beetle the night before, exploded. Silas Shamiso, one of his bodyguards, was also killed in the attack while Sadat Kufamadzuba, his other bodyguard, was injured. The explosion sent part of the car onto the roof of his house and uprooted a tree next door. Hours later one of his neighbours died of injuries he sustained in the explosion. ZANU at the time blamed the Rhodesian Security Forces.

Zambian president Kenneth Kaunda commissioned an inquiry into Chitepo's death. Documents released in October 2001, placed the blame on ZANU infighting between the Karanga and the Manyika. However, in his biographical account, The Legend of the Selous Scouts, Lt Col Ronald Reid-Daly, officer commanding, Selous Scouts Regiment, Rhodesian Security Forces, clearly states that the Rhodesian Central Intelligence Organization (CIO) under the leadership of Director General Ken Flower, masterminded the assassination of Herbert Chitepo, subsequently planting documentary evidence blaming ZANU members.

"The decision by Ken Flower ... to assassinate Herbert Chitepo, head of the ZANU War Council, now showed how badly Flower has misread the ZANU/ZANLA situation. The death of Chitepo purged ZANU of its many dissenting factions and a new and highly successful leader emerged. Robert Mugabe gave ZANLA the means to consolidate its efforts by providing ZANLA with an indispensable factor – unity." [pg. 173 The Legend of The Selous Scouts]

== See also ==
- List of unsolved murders (1900–1979)
