= Msipa =

Msipa is a surname. Notable people with the surname include:

- Cephas Msipa (1931–2016), Zimbabwean politician
- Emmaculate Msipa (born 1992), Zimbabwean association football player
- Kuda Msipa (born 1981), Founder CUTMEC
