= Sheba Tavarwisa =

Zimbabwe African National Liberation Army war veteran

Sheba Tavarwisa (born 1 August 1946) was a war veteran from Zimbabwe. She was one of the first female commanders of the military wing of Zimbabwe African National Union (ZANLA), which spearheaded the country's revolution against colonial rule.

== Revolution ==
Tavarwisa worked as a primary school teacher until she left to join the Zimbabwe African National Liberation Army (ZANLA) to fight for the country's liberation. She was one of the early cadres and first female commanders of the movement. Her initial responsibility was to carry and supply arms from Zambia to Mozambique to the frontlines in Zimbabwe (formerly Rhodesia). She was also responsible for disseminating the movement. She cooperated particularly among the peasants to gather their support. Tavarwisa also ensured that women in the camps were not being sexually harassed or exploited.

Tavarwisa trained members, undertook missions and led revolts as a commander while managing to tend to her children.

In 1978, Tavarwisa became ZANU's Deputy Secretary for Education. She rose through the ranks and became a member of ZANU's supreme decision making body, the high command. She took part in planning strategies and was the only woman among 27 others. Apart from being a member of ZANU's women's department, she was elected to sit at the organization's central committee.

Educator and politician Fay Chung, who was also a member of ZANU, commented on Tavarwasa that:

The only camp commander who to my knowledge refused to comply with this systematic abuse of some of the young women who had joined the struggle, many of them for the most idealistic of reasons, was Sheba Tavarwisa, a top woman commander and one of the first and most respected of women guerrillas. She was a skilled and wise leader, who managed to maintain her integrity while enjoying the absolute trust of Tongogara, despite the fact that she always refused to comply with his demands for women. Josiah Tongogara respected her combination of independence and loyalty.

— Dr. Fay Chung

== Death ==
Tavarwisa died on 3 June 1994.

She was buried in her village homestead in Gutu. She was not acknowledged as a hero, prompting ZANU-PF provincial official Mapiye Wekwete to question the late vice president Simon Muzenda about the criteria for recognizing pioneer war veterans.

Many male colleagues who later joined the struggle and even those who were trained by early female combatants such as Tavarwisa were granted hero status and buried at the National Heroes' Acre.
