= Gonakudzingwa restriction camp =

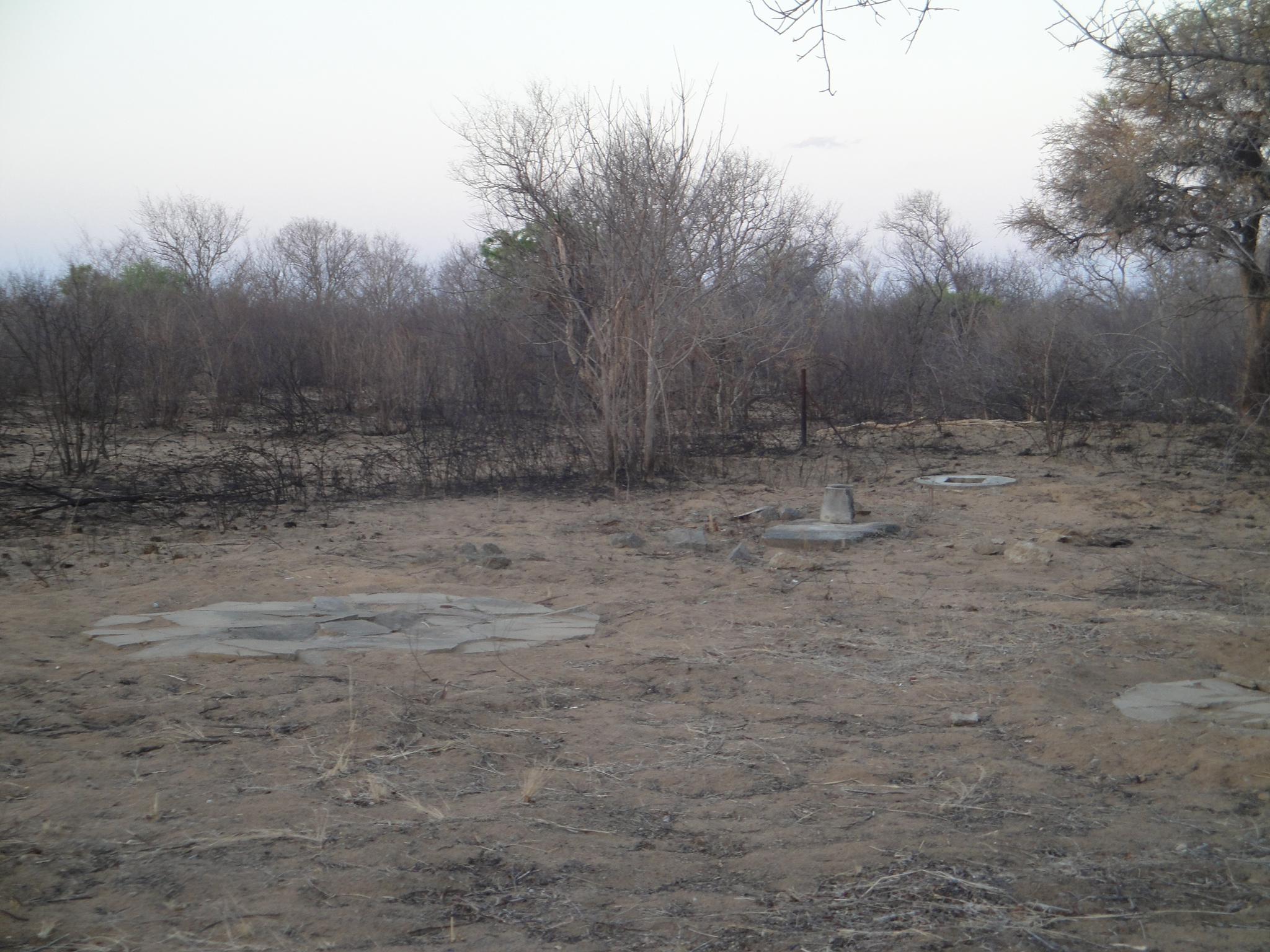
- Concrete slabs at Gonakudzingwa, being all that remains of the camp in 2011
- Location: Gonarezhou National Park, near Sango border post, Chiredzi District, Zimbabwe
- Status: Closed
- Security class: Political detainees detention camp
- Closed: 1979

Gonakudzingwa ("where the banished ones sleep") restriction camp in Southern Rhodesia, near the Mozambique border, was set up by Ian Smith's government.

== Inmates ==
African nationalists detained there included student youth leader Paul Tangi Mhova Mkondo, Josiah and Ruth Chinamano, Daniel Madzimbamuto, Sydney Joseph, Joshua Nkomo, Joseph Msika, Robert Mugabe, Edgar Tekere, Leopold Takawira, Maurice Nyagumbo, Naison Ndlovu, Sikhanyiso Ndlovu, Charakupadenga Hunda, Kissmore Benjamin Kaenda, Zinja Ngwazani Mhlanga, Jane Lungile Ngwenya, Tumburai Matshalaga, Ishmael Muneri 'Mandebvu' Chidakwa Chuma, Isaac Chakanyuka, Christopher Ushewokunze, Reuben Dunduru, Charlton Ngcebetsha, Jini Ntuta and many others.

== Prison ==
Detainees were only allowed to walk 4 miles west of the camp towards the cleared land and 2 miles eastwards towards uncleared game land. They would meet the wrath of marauding lions and elephants in the game reserve if they tried to escape.

They were organised into groups of seven and they would prepare food for themselves, often displaying considerable ingenuity in their recipes. A popular fear was that they might be poisoned by the government, although this never happened.

Most of the detainees were ferried to the restriction camp by train and a few were ferried by a plane popularly known as Dakota (Douglas DC-3). The detainees would be under armed guard and always on iron legs. Their relatives could only visit them after getting clearance from the Special Branch of the Police in then capital Salisbury.

Detainees would discuss current political issues every Saturday and Joshua Nkomo normally addressed them. Concrete slab remnants where the zinc barracks of the nationalists used to be erected are still in place at the former detention camp located in the notorious Gonarezhou national park at Sango border post between Zimbabwe and Mozambique.

Most of the prominent detainees (such as Mugabe and Nkomo) were released in 1974 following pressure from the South African government.

== Monument ==
In 2013, the National Museums and Monuments of Zimbabwe began the process for declaring Gonakudzingwa as a National Monument.
