= Thenjiwe Lesabe =

Zimbabwean activist

- Born: January 5, 1932; Hope Fountain, Matabele, Zimbabwe
- Other name: Thenjiwe Khumalo
- Occupation: Politician
- Years active: 1949-2011
- Known for: Political activism
- Notable work: 1949-1953 activist of the Gama Sigma Club. Among the first women to join the National Democratic Party (NDP). Leader of ZAPU Women's League until banning of party in 1962. Involved in the Zhi Public Uprisings in the 60's.

Thenjiwe Lesabe was a Zimbabwean nationalist who was also a teacher, war veteran and political activist.

== Early life and career ==
Khumalo was born at Hope Fountain near Bulawayo on 5 January 1932. She attended White Water Primary and then trained as a teacher at Hope Fountain. She was a teacher at Lotshe Primary school in Mkokoba before resigning in 1949 and joining Bantu Mirror as a journalist.

== Political activism ==
Between 1949 and 1953 she was a political activist in a social club called Gama Sigma Club that focused on social issues for Africans. In 1957 she joined the Southern Rhodesian African National Congress becoming one of the first members of the party.

In 1960, she joined the National Democratic Party and was elected chairlady of the Bulawayo District Committee at the first inter-branch committee. As chairlady she combined the two areas of Mzilikazi and Barbourfields and formed a branch called Mziba.

After the banning of NDP and subsequent formation of ZAPU, Lesabe maintained her position as chairlady of Women's League in the new party until the party was also banned in 1962.

Lesabe maintained her activism despite the banning of the party and later became part of the People's Caretaker Council (PCC) in which she was elected to the National Council. PCC (which was a vehicle for ZAPU evading a ban) was itself banned in 1964.

Between 1970 and 1974 she went around the country drumming up support for ZAPU. At a Congress of the ANC in 1975 she was elected to the National Executive as head of ZAWU while Josiah Chinamano was elected the vice president and Joseph Msika was made the Secretary General.

She later moved to Zambia when the liberation battle intensified and was mandated to liaise with the international community and lobby for independence.

Lesabe was elected as Member of Parliament for Matobo on a PF-Zapu ticket after independence. In 1984 she was elected head of ZAWU at a ZAPU Congress.

After the signing of the Unity Accord between ZANU and ZAPU, she was made deputy minister of Tourism and served in the Women's Committee whilst in ZANU PF. In 2009 she left ZANU PF and returned to ZAPU.

Lesabe died in 2011 and was denied hero status but was given state funeral. From 2003 until her death she was placed on the United States sanctions list.
