= Joseph Culverwell =

Zimbabwean politician

Joseph Luke Culverwell

Deputy Minister of Education and Culture. Minister of State
- President: Robert Mugabe

Personal details
- Born: 10 July 1918 Johannesburg, Transvaal, Union of South Africa
- Died: 16 July 1993 (aged 75) Parirenyatwa Hospital, Harare, Zimbabwe
- Party: ZANU-PF
- Education: University of Cape Town
- Occupation: Teacher
- Profession: Senator

Joseph Luke Culverwell (1918–1993) was a South African-born Zimbabwean politician and psychologist. Between 1981 and January, 1988, Culverwell was the Deputy Minister of Education and Culture of the Republic of Zimbabwe. In January 1988, he was appointed to the Minister of State in the President’s Office responsible for National Scholarships until 1992 when, for a brief period, he became the Deputy Minister of Higher Education.

== Early life and education ==
Culverwell attended McKeurtan and Moffat primary schools in Bulawayo and Harare respectively, before entering Trafalgar High School in Cape Town. He graduated in Education and Psychology from the University of Cape Town and Nottingham University in England.

== Second World War ==
Culverwell was an NCO and served with the Rhodesian Army and was attached to the Argyll and Sutherland Highlanders, British Army in Ethiopia, Somalia, Kenya and Egypt.

== Political career ==
In 1938, he was elected secretary general of the National Association of Coloured Peoples. He attended the inaugural meeting of the African National Congress of Southern Rhodesia. He became a member of ZAPU and later ZANU in the 1960s. He was imprisoned for 18 months in 1967 by the Rhodesian Government of Ian Smith. As a Coloureds community leader he was appointed a Senator in 1980. Between 1981 and January, 1988, Culverwell was the Deputy Minister of Education and Culture of the Republic of Zimbabwe. In January 1988 he was appointed to the Minister of State in the President’s Office responsible for National Scholarships until 1992 when, for a brief period, he became the Deputy Minister of Higher Education.

== Honours ==
In 2011, Culverwell was commemorated on a Zimbabwean Post $1 stamp. He is buried at National Heroes' Acre and considered a hero by the incumbent Zimbabwe African National Union – Patriotic Front regime, which has administered the country since independence at 1980. In November 2019 Blackinston Street in Harare was renamed Joseph Culverwell.

== See also ==
- Government of Zimbabwe
- Parliament of Zimbabwe
