= Washington Malianga =

Rhodesian politician (1926–2014)

Washington Malianga (21 June 1926 – 22 June 2014) is one of several leaders of the Zimbabwe African People's Union who left ZAPU in 1963 and founded the Zimbabwe African National Union. ZAPU leader Joshua Nkomo suspended their membership due to their opposition to his continued leadership. The other leaders were Ndabaningi Sithole, Robert Mugabe, and Leopold Takawira. He served as Party Secretary.

Malianga was born at the Old Umtali Mission in 1926.

In 1973 he lost his bid to be re-elected as Party Secretary. He died in Harare on 22 June 2014, one day after his 88th birthday.
