= George Silundika =

Zimbabwean politician

George Silundika was a Zimbabwean politician who was a speaker, writer and editor.

== Early life ==
Tarcisius Malan George Silundika born March 1929 in Plumtree, Bulilimamangwe District. His father was a businessman and a member of the Kalanga tribe of that area. George received his primary education at Empandeni mission school and then went to St Francis College, Marian Hill, Natal in 1945.

== Political career ==
In 1951 he enrolled at Fort Hare University in Eastern Cape province of South Africa, he was expelled the following year for political activism. In 1954 he obtained a place at the Pius XII University Roma in Basutoland (now Lesotho), he also became a research assistant at the University of Rhodesia and Nyasaland in the department of African Studies. He then entered in politic in 1959. Back home he began organizing protests and leading demonstrations in Highfield, Harare. He became an executive member of the ANC, NDP and ZAPU before they were banned. In 1963, he was sent to Lusaka to direct the first stages of the armed struggle and there he built and strengthened ZIPRA. He also sought the unification of ZANLA and ZIPRA as well as ZANU and ZAPU in order to promote greater unity of purpose and action.

Cde Silundika returned home after the Lancaster House Conference and was elected a ZAPU MP for Matabeleland South, and became a Minister. He was one of the three appointed PF ZAPU Ministers by Robert Mugabe alongside Joshua Nkomo and Joseph Msika. He suffered a stroke while he was working in office on 9 April 1981.

Cde Silundika "TG" as he was popularly known in political circles died barely a year after Zimbabwe attained its independence when he suffered a stroke while working in his ministerial office. Cde Silundika was Minister of Roads, Road Traffic, Post and Telecommunications and a member of ZAPU's Central Committee at the time of death on 9 April 1981. He was buried at Heroes Acre in April 1981.

== Important dates in his career ==
1960-61 - Secretary General NDP

1963 - External Representative PCC(Lusaka)

1975 June- Nominated Member of ZLC

1976 - Secretary for Information (ANC), Nkomo

1976 - Delegate (ZAPU), Geneva

1979 - Delegate to Lanaster House (ZAPU)

1980 - PF MP for Matebeleland South

1980 - Minister of Posts and Telecommunications, Government of Zimbabwe
