= Simon Mazorodze =

Simon Charles Mazorodze
- Born: 29 November 1933; Mhondoro, Southern Rhodesia
- Died: 6 November 1981 (aged 47); Zimbabwe
- Resting place: National Heroes' Acre
- Education: MBCh.B
- Alma mater: University of Natal
- Occupations: politician, medical doctor
- Organization: Zanu PF
- Known for: Cabinet Minister, war veteran
- Notable work: ZANU PF founding member
- Term: 1 year 7 months
- Successor: Timothy Stamps
- Political party: Zimbabwe African National Union Patriotic Front (Zanu Pf)

Simon Charles Mazorodze (29 November 1933 – 6 November 1981) was a Zimbabwean cabinet minister and a medical doctor by profession. He is also widely credited as one of the founders of the Zimbabwe African National Union Patriotic Front, which has been ruling the country since independence.

== Background ==
Mazorodze was born in Mhondoro on 29 November 1933. He studied at Goromonzi High School. Upon completion of his studies there he later went to South Africa where he attended the then University of Natal's medical school and later graduated as a medical doctor. The years spent in South Africa saw the young Mazorodze become politically conscious and this may have contributed to his coming back and working for the Rhodesian government so as to be able to contribute to the struggle from within.

Mazorodze died on 6 November 1981, at the age of 47.

== Career ==
Upon returning to Zimbabwe (then Rhodesia), he worked in Masvingo and Harare Hospitals. He is credited as one of the founding fathers of Zanu Pf but, as a civil servant, had to be content with underground activities such as contributing money to the party, assisting refugees who were fleeing Zimbabwe, and treating freedom fighters that had been wounded. During the war, Cde Mazorodze was actively involved in politics and gave financial and medical assistance to the ZANLAforces. He worked tirelessly in Shurugwi, Zaka, Mweneziand Masvingo, carrying out operations on injured combatants in the bush and supplying drugs. He also approached various businessmen in Masvingo, Zvishavane, Gweru, Shurugwi and Mashava for financial aid and organized the collection of the money, and personally seeing to its delivery to the ZANLA forces. His "clandestine" activities led him into trouble with the police and he was arrested from time to time but this did not deter him from continuing to give his support to the liberation struggle. He helped in organizing the 1980 elections and was himself elected ZANU PF MP for Masvingo Province where he had worked longest. He became the Deputy Minister of Health and later Minister of Health. In both capacities, he helped restructure and re-organized the health services.
