= Paul Savage (politician) =

Zimbabwean politician (??–1983)

Paul Savage (died 1983) was a Rhodesian and Zimbabwean farmer. A member of the Senate of Zimbabwe, he was murdered by rebels in 1983, alongside his daughter and a friend from Britain.
