= Rekayi Tangwena =

Senator Chief Rekayi Tangwena (c. 1910 – 11 June 1984) was a traditional chief from Zimbabwe's eastern province of Manicaland, and was of the Nhewa/Simboti totem (leopard). He was also a member of Zimbabwe's first parliament.

== Liberation war contribution ==
He is well known as the man who helped Robert Mugabe and Edgar Tekere cross into Mozambique to join the Zimbabwe African National Liberation Army (ZANLA) guerillas who were waging a fierce bush war against Ian Smith's Rhodesian government. However, Chief Tangwena was even better known for his fierce resistance to having his people evicted from their ancestral lands by the racist white minority settler government, and he refused to make way for the white settlers. Despite being arrested more than a dozen times, he continued to resist and rebuild even after his people's homesteads had been destroyed by settler forces.

He is the only traditional chief in Zimbabwe to have been accorded the status of being a national hero, and he is buried at the National Heroes' Acre in Harare.
