= Wally Stuttaford =

Rhodesian/Zimbabwean politician

- Born: Wallace Evelyn Stuttaford; 1921; Bulawayo, Rhodesia
- Died: 2000 (aged 78–79); South Africa
- Occupations: Politician, legislator
- Political party: Republican Front; Rhodesian Front

Wallace Evelyn "Wally" Stuttaford (c. 1921 - 2000) was a Rhodesian politician. He was a Republican Front member of Zimbabwe's House of Assembly.

== Career ==
In December 1981 Stuttaford was accused of being a South African agent, arrested, and tortured, generating anger among Zimbabweans. He was re-arrested in 1982. He successfully sued the state for compensation.
