= Ruth Chinamano =

Zimbabwean politician

Ruth Lottie Nomonde Chinamano (16 February 1925 in Cape Town, South Africa – 2 January 2005) was a ZANU-PF politician and wife of Josiah Mushore Chinamano.

== Biography ==
Born in Cape Town, she studied at the Maria Zell Teacher Training College in Matatiele in what was then as East Griqualand. In 1948, she started teaching at Lourdes, a school located at the border between the Cape and Natal.

In 1949, while on holiday at Port Elizabeth, she met the Zimbabwean nationalist Josiah Chinamano. The two married in 1950 and shortly afterwards they went to Rhodesia, where she taught at Waddilove Institute, near Marandellas, 60 km east of Salisbury.

In 1964 she was detained in Gonakudzingwa Restriction Camp, near the Mozambique border, with her husband and spent the next decade in and out of detention. Paul Tangi Mhova Mkondo was also detained there for sometime as a student youth leader. She and her husband were transferred from Gonakudzingwa to Wha wha prison, outside Gwelo, where they remained until 1970, when they were released but confined to an 8 km radius restriction before being arrested again, being released again in 1974.

She was elected to parliament when Zimbabwe held non-racial elections in 1980.

She is buried in the National Heroes' Acre, a burial ground for Zimbabwean heroes and heroines which is located about 5 km from Harare and which was designed and built by North Koreans.
