= John Graham Blunt =

British-born Zimbabwean politician

John Graham 'Bob' Blunt was a British-born Rhodesian and Zimbabwean soldier, businessman, and politician.

He was a member of the Senate of Zimbabwe.
