= Masotsha Ndlovu =

Labour union leader (b. 1890, d. 1982)

Masotsha Ndlovu (1890–1982) was a black labour union leader in Southern Rhodesia, now Zimbabwe. He was active in that country's section of the Industrial and Commercial Workers' Union (ICU). He became a stalwart of the nationalist Zimbabwe African People's Union (ZAPU) in later life.

== Early life ==
Ndlovu was born at Saba village in Matabeleland. He worked in Bulawayo from 1910 as a messenger, before moving to South Africa to improve his education. In South Africa he was exposed to the African National Congress, the South African Communist Party and the ICU, as well as to the ideas of Marcus Garvey.

== Career ==
In 1927, the ICU was founded in Southern Rhodesia, and in 1928, Ndlovu became one of its leaders in Bulawayo, serving as its secretary-general. The union faced repression, and Ndlovu was jailed in 1933. Following his release, he cut all ties to the ICU.

In the 1940s, he again involved himself with unions, working with Benjamin Burombo of the African Workers Voice Association, as well as with the nationalist Southern Rhodesia African National Congress (SRANC). He was repeatedly jailed/interned from 1959 to 1971. His family was supported by the Zimbabwe African People's Union (ZAPU), one of the successors to the SRANC.

Ndlovu supported ZAPU in the transition to Zimbabwe and the first all-race national elections, where he appeared on its platforms at rallies. He died in 1982, was named a national hero, is buried at National Heroes' Acre in Harare, and has several roads named in his honour.
