= Conservative Alliance of Zimbabwe =

- Leader: Ian Smith
- Founded: 23 July 1984
- Dissolved: c. October 1992
- Preceded by: Republican Front
- Merged into: Forum Party
- Headquarters: Harare
- Ideology: Conservatism; Anti-corruption; White interests (until 1986)
- Political position: Centre-right
- Colours: Purple

The Conservative Alliance of Zimbabwe (CAZ) was the final incarnation of a party that had been called the Republican Front, and before that the Rhodesian Front (RF). In the immediate post-independence period, the party sought to promote the position of White Zimbabweans and did not seek support amongst other ethnic groups. Following the abolition of the "white roll" seats in parliament, the CAZ attempted to distance itself from its past and appeal to black voters.

== White politics post-independence ==
White politics in Zimbabwe immediately after independence were mainly involved in contesting the 20 reserved "white roll" seats in the Zimbabwe parliament. They were the majority party of white politicians although some whites eventually joined ZANU–PF. The RF party remained under the dominance of Ian Smith who insisted on keeping its identity as a party concentrating on issues of importance to whites, or as Smith described it, "representing the interests of the white people". The RF and later CAZ did not contest common roll seats in the 1980 or 1985 elections. The inadequacy of this as a political strategy quickly became apparent. Most of the sitting RF MPs in the 1980 to 1985 parliament either became independents or defected to ZANU–PF.

Smith's response to this in the 1985 general election was to mount a campaign against the defectors, and RF (now renamed CAZ) succeeded in winning 15 of the 20 white seats. The white seats in Parliament were abolished in 1987, although CAZ continued to enjoy limited representation at municipal level. By that time, white-led civic groups such as the CZI (Confederation of Zimbabwe Industry) and CFU (Commercial Farmers Union) were openly supporting ZANU–PF.

== 1985–1992 ==
Following the abolition of the "white roll" seats in parliament, the CAZ attempted to shed some of its past legacy and broaden its appeal by reaching out to black voters and advertising membership to people of all races.

In July 1992, Ian Smith chaired a meeting of opposition political groups with a view to forming a political front to oppose ZANU–PF. This meeting was attended by representatives of Rhodesian-era parties including CAZ, United African National Council, ZANU–Ndonga and Zimbabwe Unity Movement. The Forum for Democratic Reform and the Forum Party (incorporating CAZ) emerged from this.
