= Joseph Msika =

Zimbabwean politician (1923-2009)

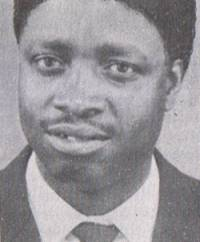

Second Vice-President of Zimbabwe
- In office 23 December 1999 – 4 August 2009 Serving with Simon Muzenda, Joice Mujuru
- President: Robert Mugabe
- Prime Minister: Morgan Tsvangirai
- Preceded by: Joshua Nkomo
- Succeeded by: John Nkomo

Personal details
- Born: 6 December 1923 Mazowe, Southern Rhodesia
- Died: 4 August 2009 (aged 85) Harare, Zimbabwe
- Party: ZANU-PF

Joseph Wilfred Msika (6 December 1923 – 4 August 2009), was a Zimbabwean politician who served as Second Vice-President of Zimbabwe from 1999 to 2009.

== Early life ==
Msika was born in Mazowe, in the Chiweshe district of Southern Rhodesia. He attended Howard and Mt Selinda institutes, where he trained to become a carpentry teacher. He then moved to Bulawayo, where he worked as a carpenter and ran a fish-and-chip shop.

Later, Msika was a teacher at Usher Institute and became active in nationalist politics, working with nationalists such as Masotsha Ndlovu and Benjamin Burombo. He joined the Rhodesia Textile and Allied Workers' Union around 1944 or 1945.

== Politics ==
=== During the Bush War ===
Msika was elected as National Treasurer of the African National Congress in 1957; it was subsequently banned, at which point Msika became Secretary for Youth in the Zimbabwe African People's Union (ZAPU), its successor organisation. As a result of his political activities, he was detained at Khami Maximum Security, Selukwe and Marandellas prisons from 1959 to 1961. He joined the National Democratic Party in 1961 and was elected a councillor.

In 1963, Msika was elected as ZAPU Secretary for Youth Affairs, and after the NDP was banned he became Secretary for External Affairs of the People's Caretaker Party.

Police arrested Msika in 1964 while he was in the home of Josiah Mushore Chinamano, and was detained at Gonakudzingwa Restriction Camp. In 1979, Msika was a member of the delegation to the Lancaster House Agreement that forged independence for Zimbabwe.

=== Post-independence ===
In 1980, Msika was included in the first post-independence government as Minister of Natural Resources and Water Development; he was one of three representatives of ZAPU in the Cabinet, along with Joshua Nkomo and George Silundika. He was also nominated to the Senate with backing from the Zimbabwe African National Union (ZANU) of Prime Minister Robert Mugabe. He was dismissed from the government in 1982, when ZANU accused ZAPU of plotting to seize power. Msika was Vice-President of ZAPU from 1984 to 1987, and he was elected to the House of Assembly in 1985 from Pelandaba constituency. Following that election, he was appointed as Minister of Public Construction and National Housing.

Joshua Nkomo and Robert Mugabe signed the Unity Accord between ZAPU and ZANU(PF), creating the Zimbabwe African National Union - Patriotic Front (ZANU-PF), on 22 December 1987. Joshua Nkomo, the leader of ZAPU, was appointed to the post of Senior Minister in January 1988.Msika served as Senior Minister of Local Government, Rural and Urban Development in the President's Office from 1988 to 1995, then as Minister without Portfolio from 1995 to 1999. He also served for a time as National Chairman of ZANU-PF from 1989 to 1999. Following Nkomo's death, Msika succeeded him as Vice-President on 23 December 1999. He was not a candidate in the June 2000 parliamentary election.

Msika was placed on the United States sanctions list in 2003 and remained there until his death.

On 5 March 2005, Msika was taken into hospital after collapsing at home, apparently having suffered a stroke and a blood clot in his head. He did not run in the March 2005 parliamentary election, but Mugabe appointed him to one of the thirty unelected seats in the House of Assembly. He also did not run in the March 2008 parliamentary election, but was appointed to the Senate by Mugabe on 25 August 2008. He was then sworn in again as Vice-President by Mugabe on 13 October 2008, together with Joyce Mujuru. In January 2009, when Mugabe went on his customary annual leave, Msika became Acting President.

Msika became ill while attending a regional summit in June 2009, reportedly due to a stroke, and was treated at a South African hospital. He subsequently died at the West End Hospital in Harare on 4 August 2009 due to hypertension; he had been hospitalised there for 46 days. Later in the day, the ZANU-PF Politburo met and agreed to confer upon Msika the status of national hero; it also agreed that he would be buried at National Heroes' Acre. At the time of his death, Msika was the Second Secretary of ZANU-PF.

After his death, Mugabe stated that Msika, together with nationalists like George Nyandoro, James Chikerema, Maurice Nyagumbo and Daniel Madzimbamuto, stood out as part of a generation of "fearless founder nationalists to taste arrest and incarceration under the notorious Federal Preventive Detention Laws of February 1959" following the banning of the African National Congress. Msika's funeral was held on 10 August, thereby coinciding with National Heroes Day. President Mugabe, Prime Minister Morgan Tsvangirai, and Deputy Prime Ministers Thokozani Khupe and Arthur Mutambara were all present for the funeral, at which Msika was buried with full military honours; various high-ranking regional officials, including South African Deputy President Kgalema Motlanthe, were also present. Speaking at the funeral, Mugabe sharply criticised the attitude of Western countries toward Zimbabwe and declared that "our nation will never prosper through foreign handouts".

== Disagreements with Mugabe ==
"Samkange insulted us, saying he could not work with unschooled people. Dumbutshena also insulted us saying we were unemployable and violent people against the whites. Mwanaka never responded. But Nkomo said what we were planning to do, the road that we would walk, would be a thorny one and said if we were prepared to face it he would join us, which he did," said Msika. He said it was then that Nkomo became the leader of the black nationalist movement in Rhodesia. Msika accused the ZANU-PF of "lying" to the world about being the pioneers in the nationalist movement: "The true history of the liberation struggle should be told. I feel I have a duty to correct this blatant lie..."

Msika questioned Mugabe's past apology for the 1987 Gukurahundi killings, which was condemned internationally for the violence it unleashed on mainly rural Ndebele, at a rally in October 2006 in Bulawayo. "When we asked him about the massacres he apologized, but I was not convinced about his sincerity," he said.
