= Republican Front (Zimbabwe) =

- Leader: Ian Smith
- Founded: 6 June 1981
- Dissolved: 23 July 1984
- Preceded by: Rhodesian Front
- Succeeded by: Conservative Alliance of Zimbabwe
- Headquarters: Salisbury
- Ideology: Conservatism; White minority interests
- Political position: Right-wing
- Colours: Purple

The Republican Front was a political party in Zimbabwe in the 1980s, led by Ian Smith as the continuation of the Rhodesian Front. The name change came on 6 June 1981 as an attempt to distance itself from its policies of the past.

On 23 July 1984 it was renamed the Conservative Alliance of Zimbabwe. At that time the party, which had started with an all-white membership, tried to appeal to black members, as well as black voters who wished to oppose the policies of the Robert Mugabe government.
