= Naomi Nhiwatiwa =

Zimbabwean independence activist and politician

World Health Organization external relations

Personal details
- Born: Naomi Pasiharigutwi Nhiwatiwa; 15 April 1941 Umtali (today Mutare)
- Died: 12 April 2012 (aged 70) South Bend
- Party: ZANU-PF
- Education: State University of New York at Buffalo
- Portfolio: Deputy Minister of Posts and Telecommunications

Naomi Pasiharigutwi Nhiwatiwa (15 April 1941 – 12 April 2012) was a Zimbabwean independence activist and cabinet minister. In the 1990s, she worked for an extended period as a director with the World Health Organization in Brazzaville, Congo.

== Biography ==
Born in Umtali (renamed Mutare in 1982), she studied in the United States at the State University of New York at Buffalo, earning a PhD in Intercultural and Diplomatic Communications in 1979. In the late 1970s, she participated in the first ZANU-PF Women's League meeting at Shai Shai in Mozambique. She became a spokesperson for the party, keen to promote women's emancipation. Following the independence of Zimbabwe in 1980, Nhiwatiwa was one of only five women who became members of parliament for the ruling ZANU–PF party. Alongside Joice Mujuru (later Vice-President between 2004 - 2014) and Victoria Chitepo, as Deputy Minister of Posts and Telecommunications, she was one of Zimbabwe's few female cabinet ministers.

In 1988, she left the government of Zimbabwe to become a senior Unicef official in Nairobi, Kenya. She moved to Brazzaville in 1993 as director responsible for the World Health Organization's external relations for the Africa Region. In 1998, she became a senior advisor to the United Nations in New York.

After retiring from the United Nations in 2001, Nhiwatiwa became a charity worker, founding the Zerapath AIDS Orphanage in Harare. She has also been a visiting professor at Pepperdine University in California.

Naomi Nhiwatiwa died in South Bend, Indiana, on 12 April 2012.
