= Julia Tukai Zvobgo =

Member of Parliament for Zvishavane
- In office 1980–1990

Secretary for Publicity and Information, ZANU–PF Women's League
- In office 1984–1990

Personal details
- Born: Julia Tukai Whande; 8 November 1937 Southern Rhodesia (now Zimbabwe)
- Died: 16 February 2004 (aged 66) Harare, Zimbabwe
- Resting place: National Heroes Acre, Harare
- Citizenship: Zimbabwean
- Party: ZANU–PF
- Spouse: Eddison Zvobgo
- Occupation: Politician; Activist
- Known for: Liberation struggle activism; women's political mobilisation

Julia Tukai Zvobgo (born Julia Tukai Whande; 8 November 1937 – 16 February 2004) was a Zimbabwean activist and politician.

== Early life ==
Julia was the third born in a family of five girls and two boys. She did her primary education at three mission schools, later proceeding to Tegwani for her secondary education, and then enrolling for teacher training at Gutu Mission. She qualified as a teacher in 1958, and then proceeded to Usher Mission in 1961, where she pursued a diploma in Domestic Science. While at Usher, she met her future husband Eddison Jonas Mudadirwa Zvobgo, who was soon to leave for the US to study at Tufts University in Massachusetts on a scholarship. Soon after they got married, she became pregnant with her first child Kerina, and as a result stayed at home with her family in Shurugwi.

== Political career ==
Julia Zvobgo's earliest experience with racist repression was when she witnessed the arrest of her husband, then returning from the United States. Her husband was subsequently sentenced to 18 months’ imprisonment. Having become a member of Zanu at its formation in August 1963, Zvobgo and other young women bore the brunt of suppressive racist colonial rule which peaked under the Rhodesian Front. The banning of Zanu in 1964 saw her husband detained and restricted for six years at Sikombela and other camps of incarceration across the country. As a result, she went to the UK. From 1968 -1971 she studied in the United Kingdom and at Hillcroft in Surrey. Later, on a United Nations scholarship, she completed a diploma in Institutional Management at Leeds Polytechnic. She then continued her higher education in 1975 in the United States where her husband was studying and teaching. She completed a BA (Political Science, 1977) at Lewis University in Illinois, USA. When her husband left for Mozambique to join others in the liberation struggle, she would completed an MS (Administration, 1978) at Notre Dame University.

Zvobgo's commitment to her family and nationalist values made her endure the constant harassment and torture at the hands of the Rhodesian security agents who accused her of smuggling political messages to and from her detained husband and his colleagues. From 1968-1978 Julia studied abroad and later joined her husband in the armed struggle in Mozambique where she was elected Administrative Secretary for Women's Affairs. She attended problems of women in military and refugee camps and was one of the pioneers of the Women's League.

Zvobgo was among the first group of Zanu-PF cadres to return to Zimbabwe in December 1979 after the Lancaster House Conference. She was part of election directorate and helped open the party's head office at 88 Manica Road (now Robert Mugabe Road). She was imprisoned for two weeks during the 1980 election campaign for allegedly assisting Zanla forces in the Zvishavane area and was only released after the polls. Julia was elected MP for the Midlands constituency of Zvishavane at the historic 1980 elections and was subsequently elected secretary for publicity and information in the Women's League in 1984.

Cde Zvobgo was also a member of the Zanu-PF Central Committee during the first decade of Zimbabwe's independence. She was elected Secretary for Publicity and Information in the Women's League in 1984 and re-elected MP for Zvishavane in 1985. She retired from active politics in 1990 to concentrate on family business.

== Death and remembrance ==
Julia Zvobgo died on Monday, 15 February 2004, after a heart attack at her Kambanji home in Harare. This followed a stroke that she suffered in 2003 while taking care of her ailing husband in Cape Town, South Africa. Zvobgo was given the rare honor of becoming the fourth woman - after Sally Mugabe and Joanna Nkomo (wife of Joshua Nkomo) - to be declared a National Hero. She was buried at the National Heroes Acre, a shrine that honours Zimbabwe's independence fighters. It was announced on ZBC that President Mugabe would not attend her funeral as he was suffering from chest pains shortly after he celebrated his 80th birthday. However it is believed that President Mugabe did not attend the funeral as he was no longer on good terms with Zvobgo's husband, who was Mugabe's nemesis. Her husband died six months after her death. Ms. Julia was a member of the Methodist Church.
