= Jane Ngwenya =

Zimbabwean politician (1935–2021)

Deputy Minister of Labor, Manpower and Social Protection
- In office 1980–1985

Personal details
- Born: 15 June 1935 Buhera District, Southern Rhodesia
- Died: 5 August 2021 (aged 86) Bulawayo, Zimbabwe
- Party: National Democratic Party; ZAPU
- Occupation: Politician

Jane Ngwenya (15 June 1935 – 5 August 2021) was a Zimbabwean politician.

She served as Deputy Minister of Labor, Manpower and Social Protection during Zimbabwe's first independent government in 1980.

She fought for racial justice against the white minority in Rhodesia, joining the National Democratic Party of Zimbabwe in 1960 and later served as the first woman executive of the Zimbabwe African People's Union (ZAPU).

== Biography ==
She was the first of two daughters of Gérard Ngwenya, a Sotho man from South Africa who was a Methodist missionary and had moved to Southern Rhodesia. She was raised by her maternal grandparents following the death of her father. She attended secondary school at the Madende School in the Manicaland Province. She became a schoolteacher in Que Que before entering politics.

Ngwenya married Georges Tinarwo in 1952. She gave birth to her first child, Emmanuel, in 1953, followed by Elisabeth and Shingirai. Emmanuel and Elisabeth both preceded their mother in death. She divorced her husband in 1960 after he had urged her not to pursue politics, but she sacrificed her marriage for her freedom from the British Empire and never remarried.

Ngwenya entered politics under the inspiration of Joshua Nkomo and future President Robert Mugabe. Her dislike of white people in Rhodesia started after her grandfather was beaten and imprisoned in addition to having his cattle stolen. In 1952, she joined the African National Congress and met Benjamin Burombo the following year, beginning to follow him and other trade unionists who spoke on policy. In February 1959, the African National Congress was banned and she was imprisoned for two weeks alongside her two year-old daughter, Elisabeth, which started the breakdown of her marriage. She was the first woman to serve on the National Executive of ZAPU and was the last surviving founding member. She was the party's National Secretary for Women's Affairs.

In 1963, Ngwenya was arrested several times for her involvement in resisting the Rhodesian Front, led by Winston Field and Ian Smith, who would later lead Rhodesia's Unilateral Declaration of Independence in 1965. She was imprisoned from 1964 to 1975 and fought to change the treatment of women in prison. On 22 June 1977, she was injured in a bomb attack in Zambia. In 1979, she participated in negotiations with the United Kingdom at the Lancaster House on the issue of Zimbabwe Rhodesia, which led to the independence of Zimbabwe in April 1980.

Ngwenya was elected to the National Assembly of Zimbabwe in 1981 and served there till 2001.

Jane Ngwenya died in Bulawayo on 5 August 2021 at the age of 86 from COVID-19 and was buried on the Zimbabwe National Heroes Acre in Harare as she was declared a national heroin.
