= Josiah Chinamano =

Zimbabwean politician (1922–1984)

Josiah Mushore Chinamano (29 October 1922 – 1984) fought in the Second Liberation War as a guerrilla of the Zimbabwe African People's Union. He later served as the Minister of Transport.

Born near Epworth Mission, the son of peasants, Chinamano worked as a teacher, headmaster, and eventually supervisor of schools. He obtained a BA from the University of Fort Hare. He left teaching in 1960 and bought a store while continuing his political activities. He then set up Highfield Community School and became its headmaster.

In 1964 Chinamano and his wife were arrested, and they spent most of the next decade in detention. He was involved in the establishment of the African National Council.

Chinamano was second-in-command to Joshua Nkomo, and shared many of the same ideological and political beliefs. The two, along with Chinamano's wife Ruth, Joseph Msika, another leadership figure in the struggle, and Daniel Madzimbamuto, one of the longest serving detainees, and Paul Tangi Mhova Mkondo were detained by the Smith administration in 1964. Their influential role at the forefront of the movement proved threatening to the Rhodesian government; the five leaders spent several years in Gonakudzingwa Restriction Camp, separated from their young families. Political pressure on the Smith administration resulted in their release; Chinamano resumed his political career.

Chinamano died in 1984 and was buried in the National Heroes' Acre in Harare.
