= Cephas Msipa =

Zimbabwean politician

Dr. Cephas George Msipa (7 July 1931 – 17 October 2016) was a Zimbabwean teacher, philanthropist and politician who served as the governor of Midlands Province.

== Education ==
Msipa was educated at Siboza School from 1941 to 1943 before going to Dadaya Mission where he was taught by Reverend Ndabaningi Sithole. He left school in 1949 but returned to Dadaya in 1951 to train as a primary school teacher. Between 1953 and 1954, he studied privately for his Matriculation Exemption Certificate

== General career ==
He taught at schools in Shabani, Kwekwe from 1953 to 1957. He was Headmaster for schools in Harare from 1959 to 1964. During 1963 he attended the World Teachers' Conference in Rio de Janeiro, Brazil. In the same year he attended a seminar in Nairobi, Kenya. He was the President of the Rhodesia Teachers' Association from 1961 to 1965. He was dismissed from the teaching profession by the Government in 1964 but was however retained by the Teachers Association which recognised his value by appointing him its paid secretary. Post independence, he rose to become the first anti-Robert Mugabe politician in the ruling party ZANU PF's powerful elite and did not at all lose his national hero status for that rebellion like others had.

== Political career ==
During his teaching years he became interested in politics. At first Msipa was interested in the multi-racial Capricorn Africa Society and the CAP. He later joined the Advisory Board in Kwekwe and became its chairman. He also acted as the Midlands Province correspondent for the African Daily News. He later joined Zimbabwe African People's Union (ZAPU) in 1961. Msipa was arrested in November 1965 and served with a two-year detention order. Early in 1966 he walked out of the restriction area and was on the run from the police for 10 weeks before he was arrested and sent for indefinite detention at Gwelo Prison. He remained in detention until June 1970. While in detention he studied for an external degree with the University of South Africa and graduated with a Bachelors in Administration.

In 1971 he obtained work as a Public Relations Officer for a textile company. In November 1971 Msipa was invited by Josiah Chinamano to accompany him as a representative of ZAPU during a meeting with Sir Alec Douglas-Home which was also attended by Edson Sithole and Michael Mawema. Msipa was appointed the Secretary General of the ANC but his textile job made it impossible for him to actively participate and he resigned in 1972. He was later appointed the Secretary for Education in the ANC in September 1975. He was appointed a member of the ANC delegation to the constitutional conference in Salisbury (now Harare). In January 1976 he left Salisbury on a mission to brief the Governments of Ghana and Nigeria on the progress of the conference. He was announced as a member of the ANC delegation to the Geneva Conference in October 1976.

After Zimbabwe’s independence, Msipa worked in government first as deputy minister of Youth, Sport and Recreation, Manpower Planning and Development and later as minister of Water Resources and Development and lastly as Governor of the Midlands Province. He retired from active politics in December 2014 when he decided not to contest for a central committee position.

From 2005 until shortly before his death, he was placed on the United States sanctions list.

== Personal life ==
Msipa was born in Shabani in a family of 10 children. He was married to Charlotte Msipa and they had eight children.

== Death ==
Msipa died at West End clinic in Harare around 4 am on 17 October after being hospitalised over a suspected chest infection that had degenerated into pneumonia.

== Books ==
- In Pursuit of Freedom and Justice: A Memoir (2015)
