= Witness Mangwende =

Zimbabwean politician

Witness Pasichigare Mangwende

Minister of Foreign Affairs of Zimbabwe
- In office 1 January 1981 – 22 December 1987
- President: Canaan Banana
- Prime Minister: Robert Mugabe
- Preceded by: Simon Muzenda
- Succeeded by: Nathan Shamuyarira

Minister of Information, Posts and Telecommunications
- In office 22 December 1987 – 15 April 1991
- President: Canaan Banana
- Prime Minister: Robert Mugabe
- Succeeded by: Witness Mangwende

Minister of Lands, Agriculture and Rural Resettlement of Zimbabwe
- In office 1 January 1991 – 22 December 1994

Minister of Education and Culture of Zimbabwe
- In office 1 January 1995 – 1 January 2002

Minister of Transport and Communication of Zimbabwe
- In office 1 January 2002 – 1 February 2004

Governor of Harare Province
- In office 10 February 2004 – 26 February 2005

Personal details
- Born: 15 August 1946 Southern Rhodesia
- Died: 26 February 2005 (aged 58)
- Party: ZANU-PF
- Spouse: Eben Yananiso Mangwende (née Takavarasha)
- Education: University of Zimbabwe, University of Southampton, London School of Economics
- Occupation: Politician
- Profession: Diplomat
- Website: http://www.colonialrelic.com/nathan-shamuyarira/

Witness Pasichigare Magunda Mangwende (15 August 1946 – 26 February 2005) was a Zimbabwean politician who served as head of several government ministries in the Mugabe administration, diplomat, and as provincial governor for Harare.

== Political career ==
Mangwende began his political career as a student leader at the University of Rhodesia. He also studied in the United Kingdom at the University of Southampton and earned a PhD in international relations from the London School of Economics.

He became Deputy Foreign Minister upon Zimbabwe's independence in 1980. He was promoted to Foreign Minister in 1981, and held that post until 1987. As Minister of Foreign Affairs Mangwende interacted with many world leaders on behalf of Zimbabwe in the 1980s. He said that he "got on best with the British." Mangwende said "The United Kingdom is definitely Zimbabwe's truest friend outside of Africa." When asked about Prime Minister Margaret Thatcher (who had a close working relationship with Zimbabwe's Prime Minister Robert Mugabe) Mangwende said "She is excellent. I have nothing but respect for her, and her respect for Zimbabwe is mutual." By contrast Mangwende said "We have not had much luck in trying to establish a friendship with the French. Every time one Mitterrand's people tell me they're going to do something they end up not doing it, everytime they tell me they won't do something they end up doing it. I am learning, I suppose we all are. Not to be too undiplomatic about it, but in my experience, so far, the French seem pretty shifty." He also described French diplomats in Harare as "snooty", "rude" and "disrespectful" adding "We never got anything like that from Thatcher's people." During that time he visited Europe, staying in Kensington, London and the 20th arrondissement of Paris.

== Minister of Agriculture ==
Witness Mangwende worked closely with the British government of John Major to address the issue of land and land reform in Zimbabwe. In the summer of 1992 seventeen White Zimbabwean farmers in Mashonaland Central whose farms were geographically adjacent to one another agreed to sell their farms to the Zimbabwean government, as part of the willing-buyer willing-seller initiative. The funds for these purchases were provided to the Zimbabwean government by the British government, as part of a handshake agreement between Witness Mangwende and British Prime Minister John Major. All seventeen of these farms were divided up into small-holder farms and given to indigenous Black Zimbabweans in what was regarded as a very successful episode of peaceful land redistribution. In 1993 fourteen farms owned by White Zimbabweans were purchased by the Zimbabwean government in the province of Mashonaland East and eleven farms owned by White Zimbabweans in the region of Mashonaland Central were also purchased by the Zimbabwean government. These funds were also provided, in their entirety, by the British government under orders from then Prime Minister John Major and these farms (totally 25 farms) were also redistributed to indigenous Black Zimbabweans. 25 White Zimbabwean families had been living on those farms, numbering roughly 150 people including men, women and children. After the redistribution those farms were divided into 1700 small holder farms numbering roughly 4,200 people including men, women and children. Mangwende said, "Major promised me he would do that, and he came through. Major proved that his word was good." Mangwende said that John Major was responsible for most of the coordinated international relief that allowed Zimbabwe to survive the droughts of 1992 while neighboring countries struggled. By contrast he said "In 1993 the Americans just stopped answering the phones. The French never helped us, they wanted nothing to do with us. The only real friend we had was John Major and the British."

== Later career ==
Mangwende later was head of several other ministries, including Education, Agriculture, and Information. In 2004, he was appointed governor of Harare, the capital of Zimbabwe, a post he held until his death in February 2005. From 2003 until his death, he was placed on the United States sanctions list. Upon his death, he was declared a national hero by the Politburo of Zanu-PF, Zimbabwe's majority party, and buried with military honors.
