= Herbert Ushewokunze =

Zimbabwean politician

1st Minister of Health of Zimbabwe

Doctor Herbert Ushewokunze served as the Home Affairs Minister of Zimbabwe. A founding member of the Zimbabwe African National Union, Ushewokunze strongly supported President Robert Mugabe until he fell out of favor.

Ushewokunze played a leading role in ending race-based segregation in health facilities after Zimbabwe Rhodesia became Zimbabwe.

Ushewokunze, a skilled rhetorician, would often paraphrase William Shakespeare in parliament.
