= Moven Mahachi =

Zimbabwean politician

Moven Enock Mahachi

Minister of Defence of Zimbabwe
- In office 1992 – 26 May 2001
- President: Robert Mugabe
- Preceded by: Richard Hove
- Succeeded by: Sydney Sekeramayi
- Constituency: Makoni West

Personal details
- Born: 13 June 1948 Manicaland, Southern Rhodesia (now Manicaland, Zimbabwe)
- Died: 26 May 2001 (aged 52) Nyanga, Zimbabwe
- Party: ZANU-PF
- Education: UNISA
- Profession: M.P.

Moven Enock Mahachi (13 June 1948 – 26 May 2001) served as the Minister of Defence of the Republic of Zimbabwe. He was a close ally of Robert Mugabe within Z.A.N.U.-P.F. Before becoming Defence Minister Mahachi served as M.P. for Makoni West.

Mahachi was killed on 26 May 2001 when his 2001 Land Rover Discovery collided with an Alfa Romeo sedan which did not give way to the Land Rover which was travelling along the Mutare to Nyanga road. The Land Rover subsequently overturned and landed up-side down on its roof. Mahachi who was seated in the back seat suffered head injuries and was declared dead on the spot. The car had four other passengers who all survived. At the time Zimbabweans considered his death suspicious, especially as Mahachi died thirty days after another M.P., Border Gezi, was killed.

Mahachi was married and had four children at the time of his death. He was declared a national hero by the Government of Zimbabwe and was buried in the National Heroes' Acre in Harare.

On 30 July 2009 Mahachi's predecessor, Enos Nkala, claimed that Mahachi was assassinated at the behest of Robert Mugabe because he opposed the looting of diamonds in the Democratic Republic of the Congo. In a statement he said:

Moven was an outsider in an exclusive club – the Committee of 26 – comprising politicians of Zezurus and Korekore origin. This committee of looters have controlled the army, the police, the CIO and appear to think that they went to war for self enrichment. To them Mahachi was an obstacle in their quest to amass wealth using the pretext of fighting a prolonged war to restore sovereignty in the DRC, just as they had done in Mozambique during the military campaign against Renamo. So he had to go.

In 2005 Mahachi was commemorated on Zimbabwean Post $50,000 stamp.

== See also ==
- Government of Zimbabwe
- Parliament of Zimbabwe
