= Nathan Shamuyarira =

Zimbabwean nationalist

Minister of Foreign Affairs of Zimbabwe
- In office 22 December 1987 – 15 March 1995
- President: Robert Mugabe
- Vice President: Joshua Nkomo & Simon Muzenda
- Preceded by: Witness Mangwende
- Succeeded by: Stan Mudenge

Minister of Information (Zimbabwe)
- In office 18 April 1980 – 22 December 1987
- President: Canaan Banana
- Prime Minister: Robert Mugabe
- Succeeded by: Witness Mangwende

Personal details
- Born: 29 September 1928 Southern Rhodesia
- Died: 4 June 2014 (aged 85) Harare, Zimbabwe
- Party: ZANU-PF
- Spouse: Dorothy Mandimika
- Education: Princeton University
- Occupation: Politician
- Profession: Journalist, Academic
- Website: http://www.colonialrelic.com/nathan-shamuyarira/

Nathan Shamuyarira (29 September 1928 – 4 June 2014) was a Zimbabwean nationalist who at different times fought on behalf of and helped lead FROLIZI, ZANU, and ZAPU. He later served as the Information Minister of Zimbabwe and as the Information Secretary of ZANU PF. He was writing President Robert Mugabe's biography at the time of his death.

Nathan Shamuyarira implanted the policy of vetting foreign journalists, renewing their licences every month. This was a way of weeding out government and Zanu PF critics. Very few in the country understood the implications of this policy until opposition politics was effectively silenced.

Musa Shamuyarira, Nathan's brother, was as a student in the United States and member of the MAZAZI Student Union in the 1960s was very close to the CIA affiliated American Society of African Culture and it appears that he attempted to involve Nathan in the organisation as well.

== Pius Ncube ==
In March 2005 he referred to prominent government critic and archbishop Pius Ncube as a

mad, inveterate liar. He has been lying for the past two years. He, however, fits into the scheme of the British and Americans, who are calling for regime change and are feeding him with these wild ideas. Archbishop Ncube's open call for an unconstitutional uprising shows he is an instrument of the West's illegal regime change agenda.

== International Crisis Group ==
In June 2006 he accused the International Crisis Group think tank of calling for a coup against President Robert Mugabe in the Zimbabwe's Continued Self-Destruction paper. The article, which advocated unity among the opposition political parties, warned of "greater insecurity and violence" prior to the 2008 presidential election. Shamuyarira said the ICG had "sponsored violence" by the Movement for Democratic Change.

== Minister of Foreign Affairs ==
He was considered to be routinely in dereliction of his duty, as he delegated virtually all responsibilities to other members of the government with regards to interactions with other countries. Nicholas Goche and Stan Mudenge frequently did duties that had previously been considered the responsibility of the Foreign Minister, leading to Mudenge replacing Shamuyarira in that role in 1995 with Goche taking over as Mudenge's deputy.

== Gukurahundi ==
In October 2006 Shamuyarira sparked outrage when he praised the Gukurahundi, a series of state-sponsored massacres in the 1980s, in response to the South African government's attempts to infiltrate Zimbabwe with disgruntled units of ZAPU, called Super ZAPU, as part of Operation Drama. These elements also killed white farmers to grab international headlines. Nathan Shamuyarira stated, that the "actions of the North Korea-trained Five Brigade that killed around 3000 civilians and militants in the Matabeleland and Midlands provinces during political disturbances in the 1980s were not regrettable as [the Five Brigade was] doing a job to protect the people. It was because the dissidents were killing people, that Gukurahundi went to correct the situation and protect the people. We killed vana Gwesela (the Gweselas) in my own province in Mashonaland West, in Sanyati. We killed him because he played havoc. In Matabeleland, they (vana Gwesela) killed the Shona-speaking teachers; it's not true to say the Ndebeles were the only victims. Europeans in Mat South fled their farms and went to hide in the city." Max Mnkandla, President of the Zimbabwe Liberators' Peace Initiative, and politician Jonathan Moyo also strongly condemned his comments. Mnkandla stated that Shamuyarira's comments showed he is "not only suffering from 1880s hangover – the feeling that the Ndebele also did the same to the Shonas – it also shows that Shamuyarira is now old and should retire."

The ZANU PF leadership in Matabeleland and National Party chairman John Nkomo condemned his comments, Nkomo calling them "arrogant and insulting." He further warned,

Let it be made clear that we are all Zimbabweans and those who think they are more equal than others are digging graves with their own teeth.

Mandlenkosi Ncube of New Zimbabwe, in an article titled Why Shamuyarira makes me sick, referred to Shamuyarira as a "pathetic and shameless liar," a "sick individual – a Gukurahundi denier."

He later said his comments were taken out of context, but he refused to condemn the incident, saying, "That's a situation that we would like to put into history. It's not a fair question to put to me, why should I be answering this 25 years later?"

== Sanctions ==
Shamuyarira was put on the United States sanctions list in 2003 and remained on the list until his death. In January 2007 the British government announced it would renew targeted travel sanctions on members of the Zimbabwean government who contributed to the poor human rights situation in the country. Shamuyarira claimed that the British government had not "learn[ed] from history and they don't want to leave behind their colonial suppression of independent states. Zimbabwe has done nothing wrong that deserves those illegal sanctions."

== Death ==
Shamuyarira died at the age of 85 on 4 June 2014.
