= Eddison Zvobgo =

Founder of Zimbabwe's ruling party, ZANU–PF (1935–2004)

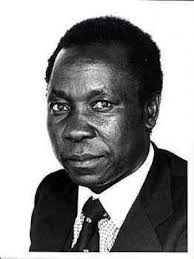

1st Minister of Local Government and Housing of Zimbabwe
- In office 18 April 1980 – 18 April 1982
- President: Canaan Banana
- Prime Minister: Robert Mugabe
- Preceded by: None
- Constituency: Masvingo, Masvingo Province

2nd Minister of Justice of Zimbabwe
- In office 18 April 1982 – 18 April 1985
- President: Canaan Banana
- Prime Minister: Robert Mugabe

1st Minister of Parliamentary and Constitutional Affairs of Zimbabwe
- In office 18 April 1985 – 18 April 1992
- President: Robert Mugabe

Minister of Mines of Zimbabwe
- In office 18 April 1992 – 18 April 1996
- President: Robert Mugabe

Minister without Portfolio
- In office 18 April 1996 – 18 April 2000
- President: Robert Mugabe

Personal details
- Born: 2 October 1935 Fort Victoria, Southern Rhodesia (now Masvingo, Zimbabwe)
- Died: 22 August 2004 (aged 68) Harare, Zimbabwe
- Resting place: National Heroes' Acre
- Party: ZANU PF
- Children: 7
- Education: Tufts University; Harvard University
- Occupation: Nationalist; Politician; M.P. – Masvingo South (18 April 1980 – 22 August 2004); Hotelier, Guerrilla War Strategist
- Profession: Lawyer; Academic; Visionary; Founding Father of Zimbabwe

Eddison Jonasi Mudadirwa Zvobgo (2 October 1935 – 22 August 2004) was a revolutionary Zimbabwean politician and the founder of Zimbabwe's ruling party, ZANU–PF. He was the ZANU-PF's spokesman at the Lancaster House in late 1979, a Harvard-educated lawyer, a poet, a guerrilla war strategist, a freedom fighter, a war veteran, a hotelier, and a national hero.

His name is often misspelled by the media, either as "Edson" instead of Eddison or "Zvogbo" instead of Zvobgo.

Zvobgo was born in dire poverty in then Southern Rhodesia in 1935, near Fort Victoria (now Masvingo), where his father was a minister in the Dutch Reformed Church. He comes from the Karanga subgroup of the Shona people. In 1960, Zvobgo won a scholarship to Tufts University in Boston, Massachusetts aged 25. After taking a bachelor's degree there in 1964, he returned home to be arrested and detained for political activism against white rule in Rhodesia, along with Robert Mugabe and Joshua Nkomo.

He was freed in 1971, and he spent a period in exile in Canada. He then studied law at Harvard University and International Relations at The Fletcher School of Law and Diplomacy, followed by a position as associate professor of criminal law at Lewis University College of Law in Illinois.

Zvobgo played a key role in international negotiations at Lancaster House that ended the bitter Rhodesian Bush War and led to British-sponsored all-race elections ahead of Zimbabwe's independence in 1980. He was the Zanu-PF spokesman, and impressed many in the international press with his quick repartee and astute analysis of the negotiations. In the 1980 elections, he won a seat in Parliament for Masvingo, which he continued to hold until his death.

An influential member of Zimbabwe's first fully independent cabinet, Zvobgo was Minister of Local Government and Housing until 1982, and Minister of Justice until 1985. In 1987, he had become Zimbabwe's Minister of Parliamentary and Constitutional Affairs and it was in this capacity that he made several amendments to Zimbabwe's Constitution.

Initially a staunch supporter of Zanu-PF policies, Zvobgo later criticized Robert Mugabe's autocratic rule.

In 1992, Zvobgo was moved to the less influential post of Minister of Mines. In 1996, Zvobgo survived a car accident, in which both his legs were broken. This accident was considered suspicious by many. Shortly after the accident President Mugabe demoted Dr. Zvobgo further to Minister Without Portfolio, and, in 2000, Dr. Zvobgo was dropped from Zimbabwe's cabinet altogether.

In the 2002 presidential elections, Zvobgo refused to campaign for Mugabe, but did not endorse the opposition challenger Morgan Tsvangirai, leader of the Movement for Democratic Change (MDC). He also voiced his opposition to the sweeping media law, passed the same year, calling it "the most serious assault on our constitutional liberties since independence".

Despite his criticism, Zvobgo eventually voted for the legislation, which was used to close off Zimbabwe's only privately owned daily newspaper, The Daily News, and to arrest at least 31 independent journalists.

Zvobgo became the subject of an internal party disciplinary inquiry in 2003 for his refusal to campaign for Mugabe and after describing the laws as a weapon to stifle opposition to the government, but allegations of disloyalty were eventually dropped. He was also accused of holding private talks with the opposition Movement for Democratic Change as the ruling party abandoned formal dialogue between the two parties.

Zvobgo died of cancer on 22 August 2004. He was declared a National Hero and buried at Zimbabwe's National Heroes' Acre. He had seven children (listed in order of birth): Kerina, Eddison, Jonasi, Tsungirirai, Tendai, Esther, and Farai Emily.

== See also ==
- Politics of Zimbabwe
