= Zimbabwe African National Union =

Militant organisation in Rhodesia, 1963–1975

- Founders: Enos Nkala, Ndabaningi Sithole, Edgar Tekere, Herbert Chitepo, Leopold Takawira, Washington Malianga, Herbert Ushewokunze
- Founded: 8 August 1963 (63 years, 82 days)
- Dissolved: 18 March 1975 (51 years, 225 days)
- Split from: ZAPU
- Succeeded by: ZANU–PF; ZANU–Ndonga
- Armed wing: ZANLA (1965–1980)
- Ideology: African nationalism African socialism Pan-Africanism; Marxism–Leninism; Communism; Anti-imperialism; Mugabeism; Maoism (factions)
- Political position: Far-left
- National affiliation: Patriotic Front
- Colours: Green, yellow

The Zimbabwe African National Union (ZANU) was a militant socialist organisation that fought against white-minority rule in Rhodesia, formed as a split from the Zimbabwe African People's Union (ZAPU) in 1963. ZANU split in 1975 into wings loyal to Robert Mugabe and Ndabaningi Sithole, later respectively called ZANU–PF and ZANU–Ndonga. These two sub-divisions ran separately at the 1980 general election, where ZANU–PF has been in power ever since, and ZANU–Ndonga a minor opposition party.

== Formation ==
ZANU was formed 8 August 1963 when Ndabaningi Sithole, Henry Hamadziripi, Mukudzei Midzi, Herbert Chitepo, Edgar Tekere and Leopold Takawira decided to split from ZAPU at the house of Enos Nkala in Highfield, Salisbury. The founders were dissatisfied with the militant tactics of Nkomo. In contrast to future developments, both parties drew from both the Shona and the Ndebele, the two major tribes of the country. Both ZANU and ZAPU formed political wings within the country (under those names) and military wings: the Zimbabwe African National Liberation Army (ZANLA) and the Zimbabwe People's Revolutionary Army (ZIPRA) respectively to fight the struggle from neighbouring countries – ZANLA from Mozambique and Zambia, and ZIPRA from Zambia and Botswana.

== Operations in exile ==
Most of ZANU's operations were planned from exile, where the party leadership was based throughout the 1970s, when the party had offices in Lusaka, Dar es Salaam, Maputo and London.

== Relationship with armed wing ==
The Zimbabwe African National Liberation Army (ZANLA) was ZANU's military wing.

== Leadership and splits ==
There were two splits within ZANU prior to independence. The first was with Nathan Shamuyarira and others leaving to join the Front for the Liberation of Zimbabwe (FROLIZI) in 1973 after Shamuyarira's bid for the party leadership was defeated by Chitepo.

Following the assassination of Chitepo on 18 March 1975, Sithole assumed leadership of the party, but faced immediate opposition from the more militant wing of ZANU, as Sithole was a proponent of détente. This crisis grew with the Mgagao Declaration, where ZANLA leaders and guerillas declared their opposition to Sithole, and led to the effective split of ZANU into a group led by Sithole, who renounced violent struggle, and the group led by Robert Mugabe and Simon Muzenda, with the support of ZANLA, who continued the murder and intimidation of farmers. Both groups continued to use the name ZANU. The Mugabe faction formed the Patriotic Front with ZAPU in 1976, and became known as ZANU-PF. Sithole's faction, dubbed "ZANU Mwenje" or "ZANU Sithole", joined a transitional government of whites and blacks in 1979, led by Bishop Abel Muzorewa. When sanctions remained in place, he joined Muzorewa for the Lancaster House Agreement in London, where a new constitution and elections were prepared.

== Zimbabwe independence ==
At the 1980 general election to the newly constituted state of Zimbabwe, ZANU–PF (registered as such) won a majority with ZAPU (registered as PF–ZAPU) in second place. ZAPU merged into ZANU–PF in 1987. Sithole's group (registered as ZANU) failed to win any seats in 1980. Later it won a few seats and was renamed ZANU-Ndonga; it remains a minor party with support among the Ndau.

== See also ==
- Politics of Zimbabwe
- Rhodesian propaganda war
- Zimbabwe African Peoples Union (ZAPU)
