= A12 road (Zimbabwe) =

Road in Zimbabwe

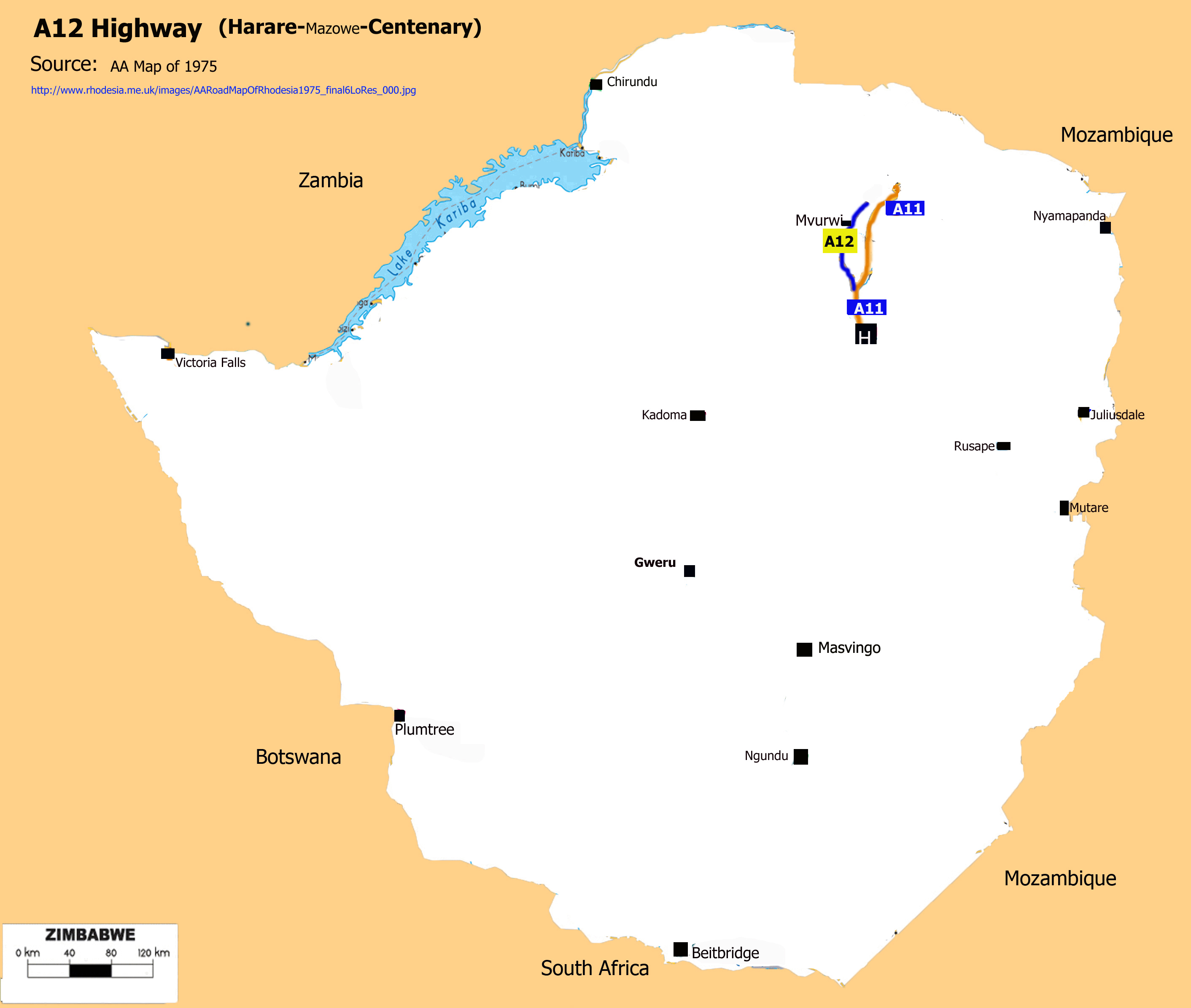

Location
- Country: Zimbabwe

Highway system
- Transport in Zimbabwe

The A12 is a road in Zimbabwe running from the A11 just past Mazowe, just over 30 km from Harare, to Centenary about 145 km (90.1 miles) from Harare.

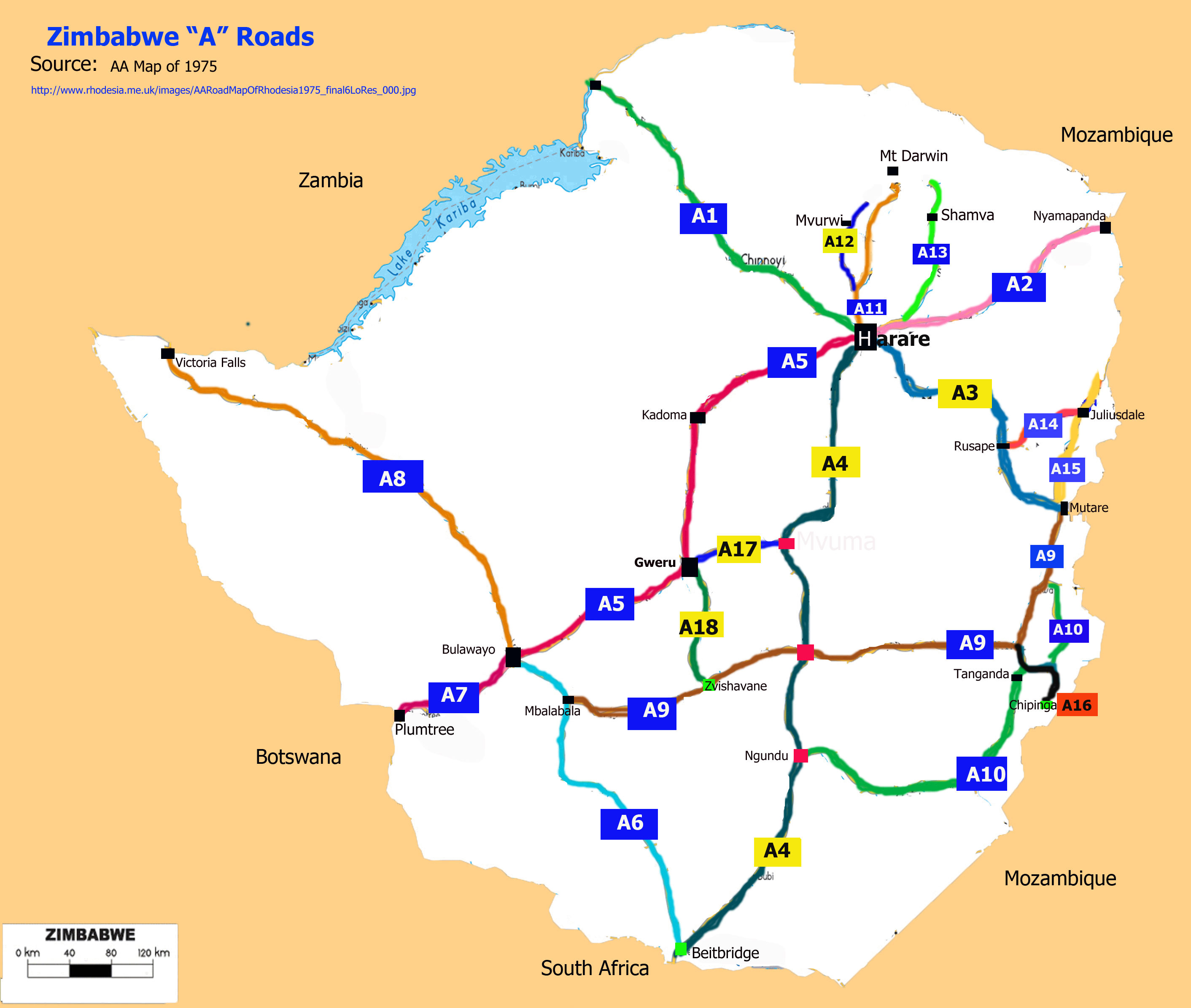
Zimbabwe "A" classified roads as of 1975

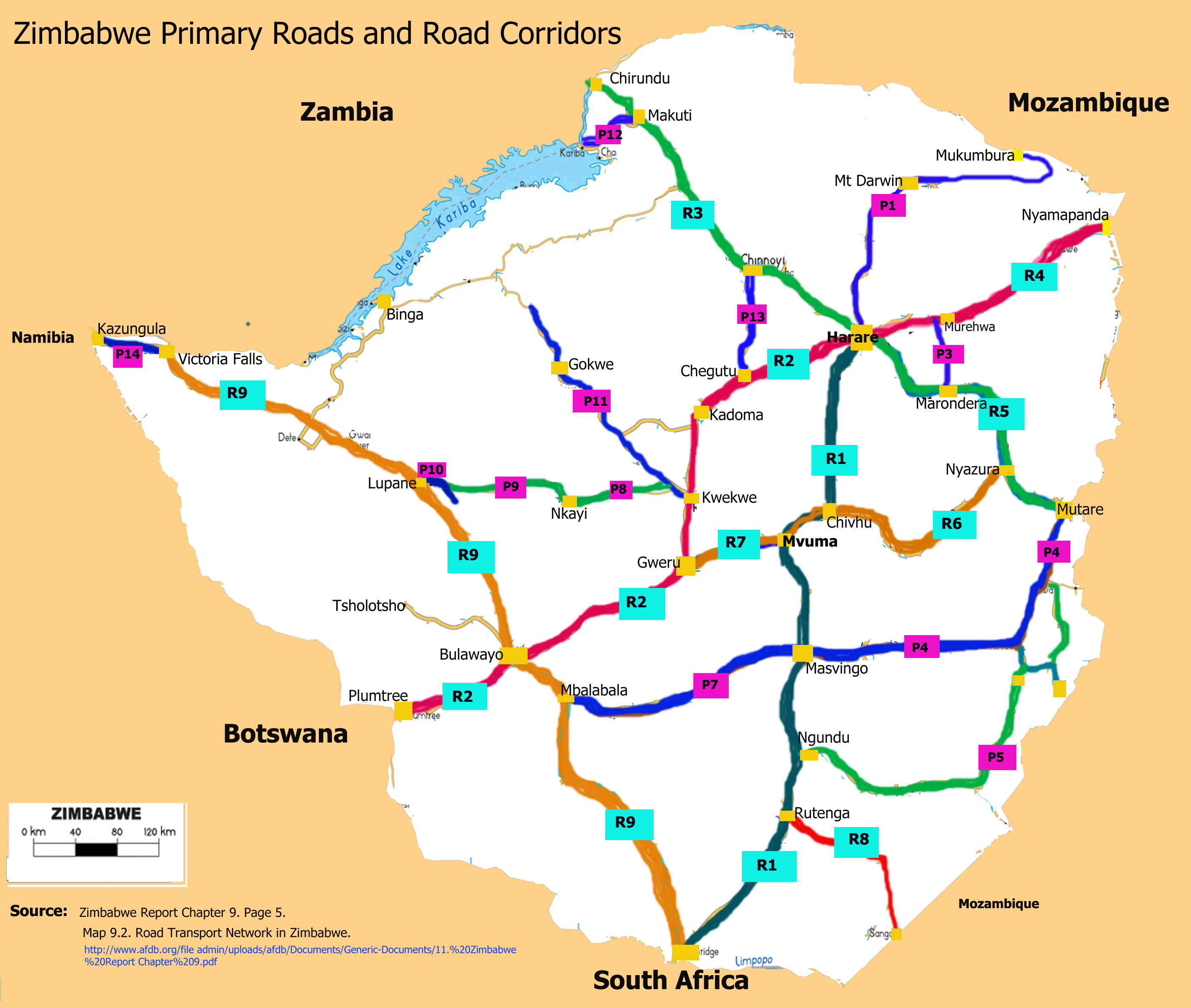
Zimbabwe Primary Roads

== Background ==
The original length of the A12 was 105 km (145 km from Harare) because it ended in Centenary. 16°43′22″S 31°06′53″E

Nowadays the highway extends past its former destination to Muzarabani down the Zambezi escapement, another 100 plus kilometres to Musengedzi Mission.

== Management ==
The Zimbabwe National Road Administration (ZINARA), a government department under the Ministry of Transport, Communication and Infrastructural Development, oversees the highway.

== Junctions ==
(Direction: South to North. Harare to Centenary)

SOURCE: [Automobile Association Map 1975]

• Concession Turn-off (south). Concession Road turns right here for traffic from Mazowe end. (12.7 km from the A11 Highway. 17°23′59″S 30°56′26″E Concession is 3.7 km east of here. From Concession the road leads to Glendale where it eventually joins the A11 Highway.

• Concession Turn-off (north). The road to Concession, Zimbabwe turns right here for traffic from Mvurwi end. 17°22′43″S 30°55′47″E

• Mutorashanga Turn-off. Mutorashanga Road turns left here about 32 km from the junction with the A11 in Mazowe. From Mutorashanga this road runs southerly to Banket on the A1 Highway running from Harare to Chirundu. Another road from Mutorashanga runs also the same direction to the right to reach the A1 Highway at Mapinga, east of Banket.

• Mvurwi Turn-off (south). Mvurwi Road turns left 22 km from Mutorashanga Turn-off. ( That is 54 km from the A11 junction ). Mvurwi is 7 km west from here. From Mvurwi one road goes northerly to Guruve and the other south-westerly to Mutorashanga and Rafingora eventually reaching Chinhoyi on the Harare-Chirundu Highway.

• Mvurwi Turn-off (north). This left turn-off, 10 km from the previous turn-off to Mvurwi also leads to Mvurwi and is used by traffic coming from the Centenary end. Mvurwi is 7 km from this point, west.

• At Centenary a 75-kilometre-long (47 mi) road to Glendale turns right and runs southerly in a semi-parallel manner with the A12 Highway back to the A11 Highway just 18 km from where the A12 Highway begins in Mazowe.

• Just after Centenary the road to Mount Darwin branches right. This road reaches Mount Darwin from the North onto the South-bound A11 Highway.

• St Albert's Mission Turn-off. The road to St Albert's Mission turns right 30 km past Centenary. This is just before the descent on the escapement. This road will go through to Karoyi and Chimimba before Mount Darwin having done a complete U-turn in the process joining the Harare bound A11 Highway.

== Bridges ==
SOURCE: [Automobile Association Map 1975]

• Marodzi River. Just after Concession Junctions

• Garamapudzi River. Not far from Marodzi River.

• Tsatsi River. At Mutorashanga Turn-off.

• Wengi River. Not far from Tsatsi River.

• Ruya River. Before Mvurwi Turn-off.

• Masingwa River. Just after St Albert's Mission Turn-off. This is already in the escapement.

== See also ==
• A11 Highway

• ZINARA

• Transport in Zimbabwe

•
