= A11 road (Zimbabwe) =

Road in Zimbabwe

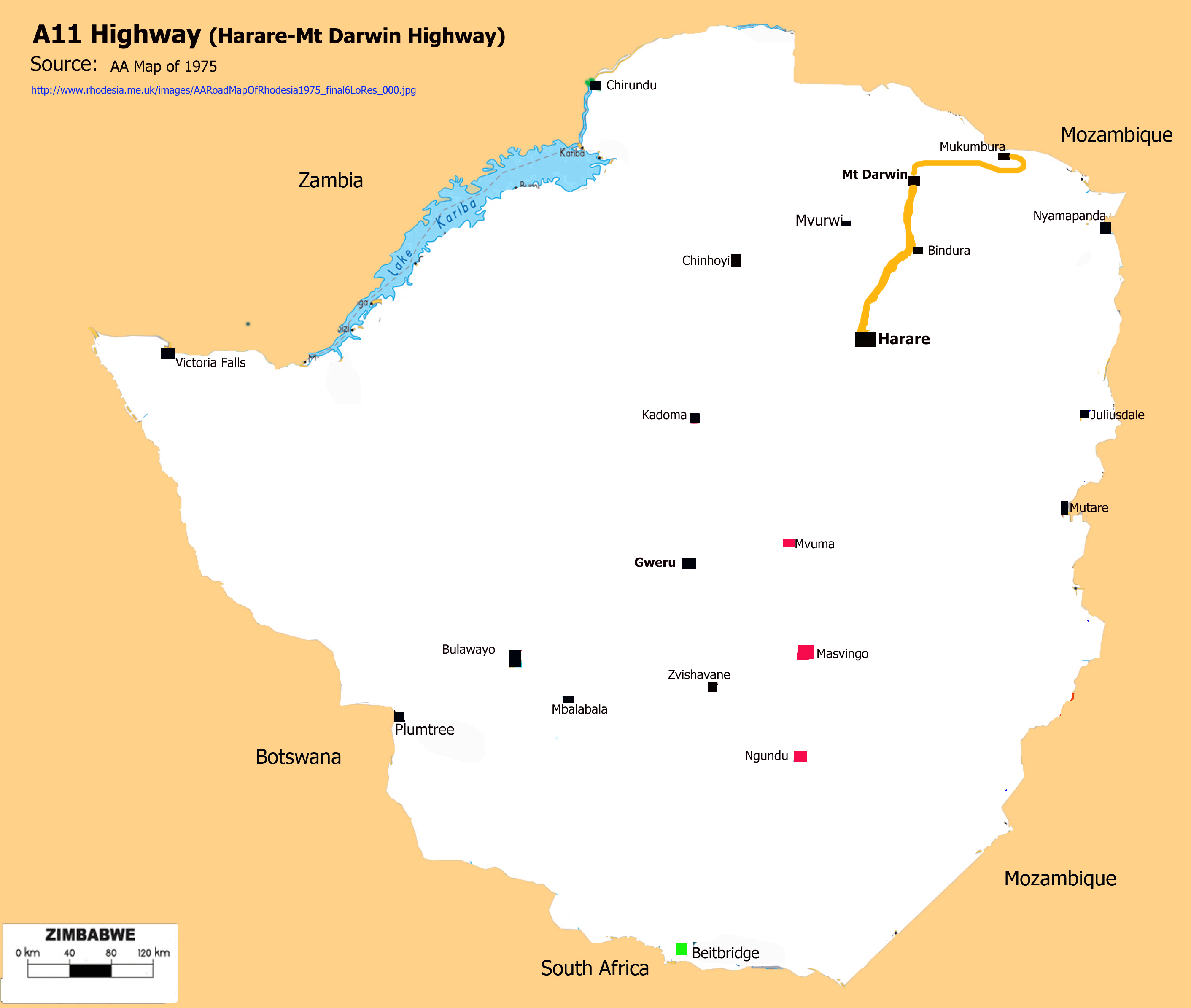

Location
- Country: Zimbabwe

Highway system
- Transport in Zimbabwe

A11 Highway is a national road in Zimbabwe, running from Harare to Bindura through to Mount Darwin. It is also known as the P1 Road, Zimbabwe primary road number 1.

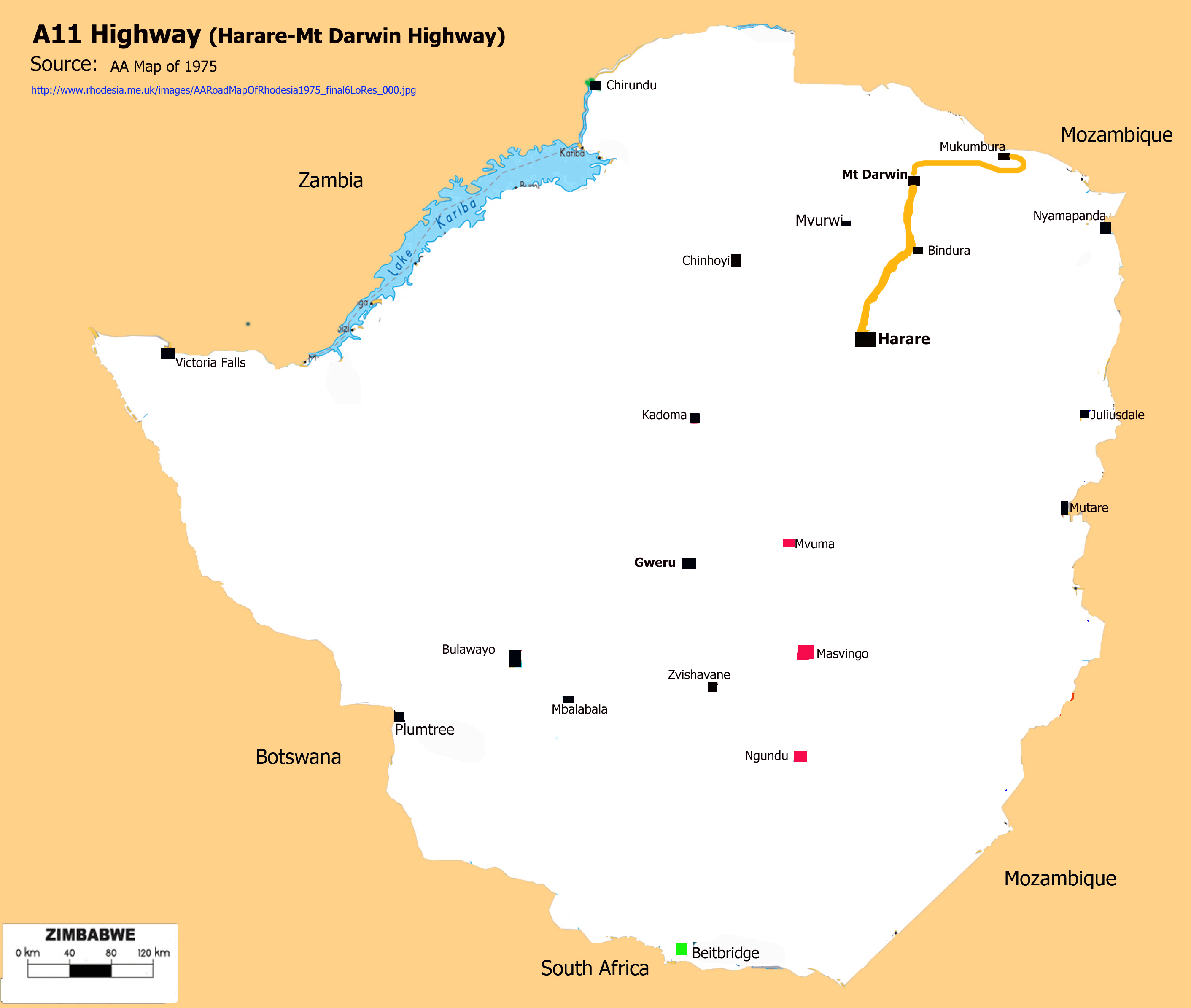
A11 Highway (Harare-Mt Darwin Highway)

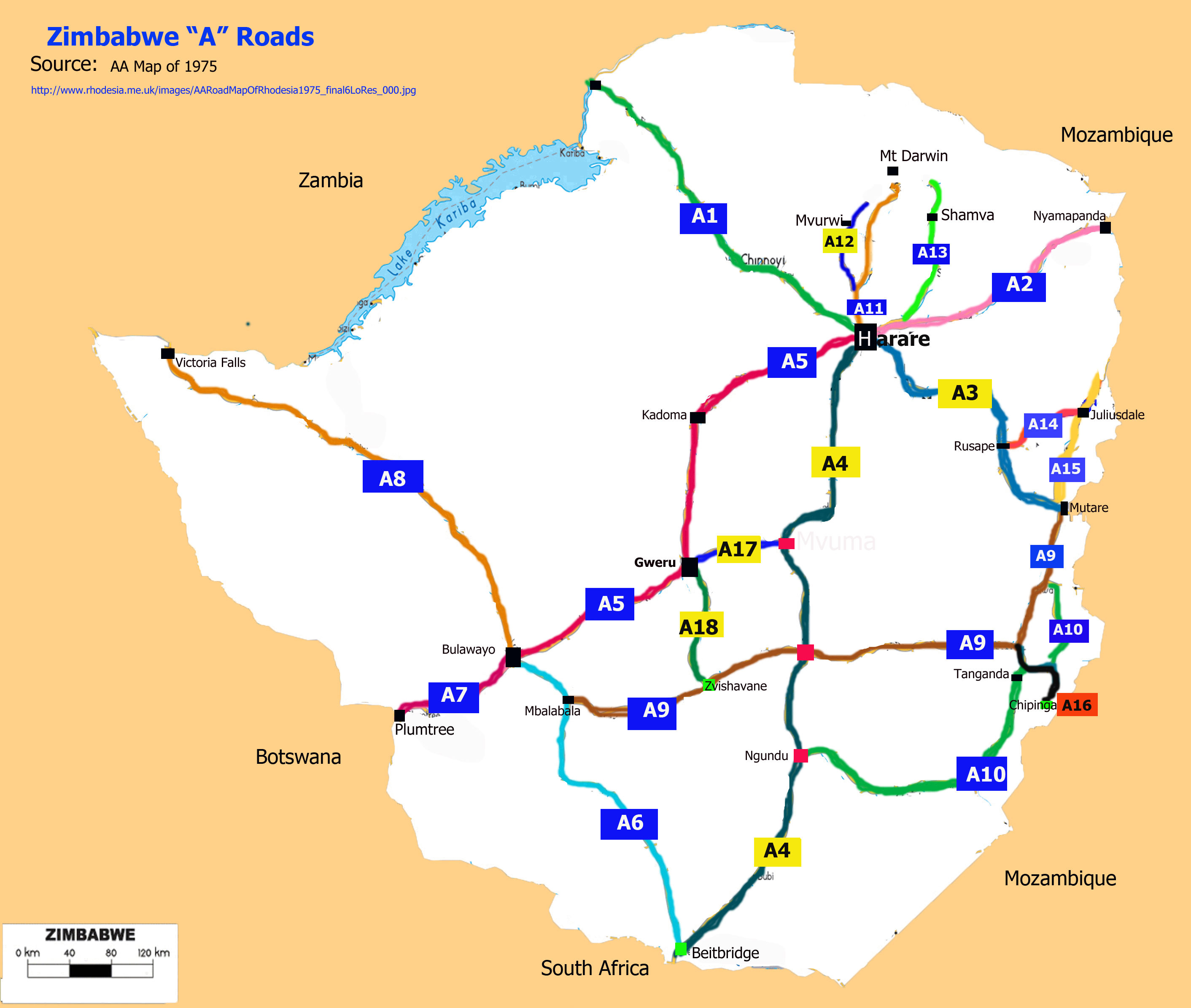
Zimbabwe "A" classified roads as of 1975

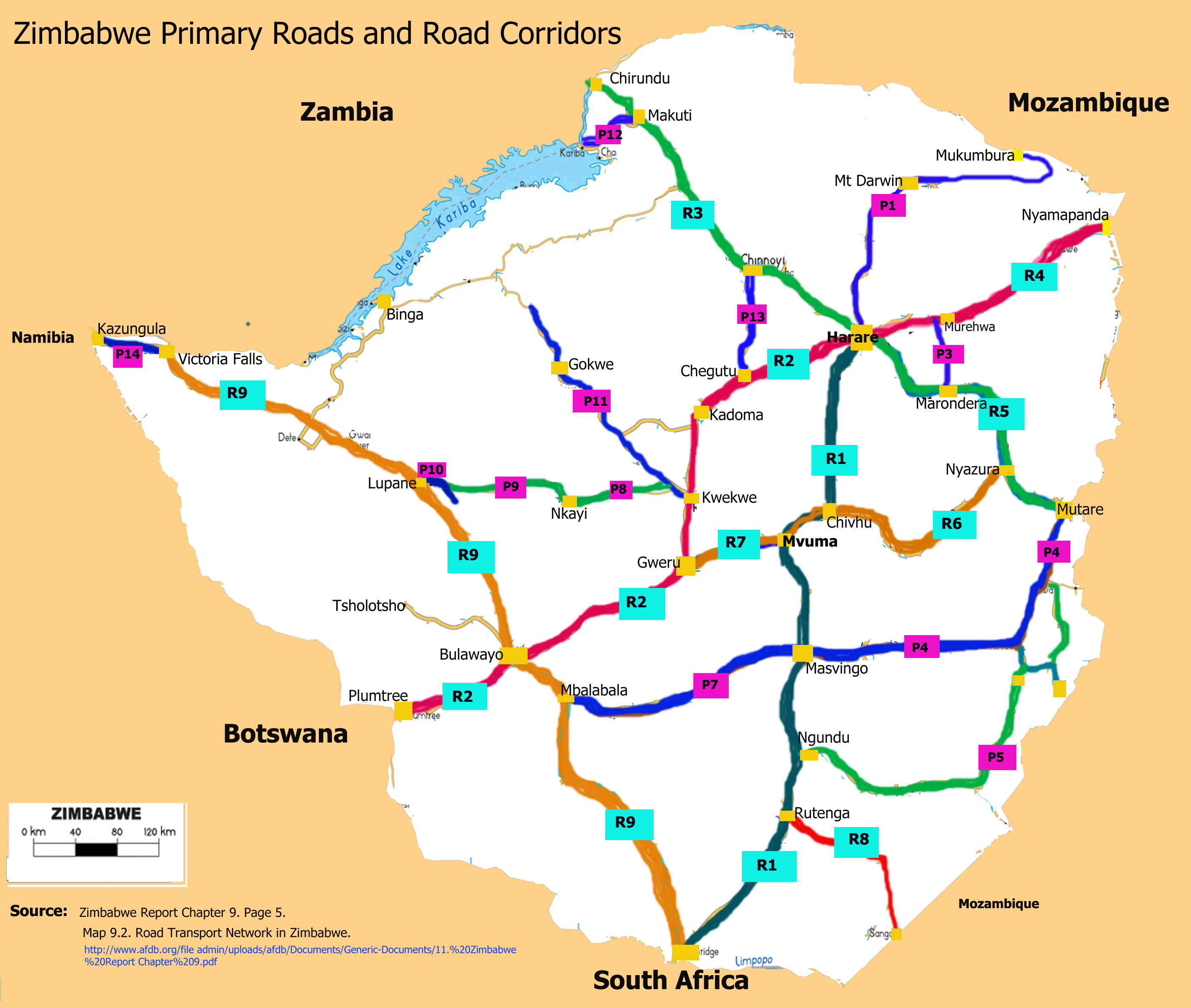
Zimbabwe primary roads

== Background ==
The A11 Highway, popularly known as Mazowe Road by Harare North populace, starts at Sam Nujoma Street (2nd St. Extension) from the Harare city centre to the intersection with Lomagundi Road which is the A1 Highway to Chinhoyi. After the intersection Mazowe Road continues north through the Northern Subarban Settlements up to Harare Drive where the A11 Highway proper begins. 17°45′06″S 31°01′42″E

The highway virtually ends in Mount Darwin. However, the route from Mount Darwin extends to Mukumbura 917.2 km (1 hour 19 minute drive) north of Mount Darwin as a combination of P1 and, P2 highways.

From Mount Darwin to Mukumbura the last 50 km after Dotito is a dirty road and quite tiring.

Mukumbura is a minor border post between Zimbabwe and Mozambique. The Mozambican side is called Mecumbira or Massala. The border posts on each side are separated by the Rio Mikumbura River.

The highway passes by the magnificent Mazowe Dam. The dam is on the right of the highway and is a marvellous sight. 17°31′44″S 30°59′23″E This is in the Mazowe area which is famous for citrus production.

== Junctions ==
- A12 Highway. 17°29′58″S 30°58′35″E
- Glendale. 17°22′03″S 31°04′26″E
- Bindura Turn-off. Here the Mount Darwin Highway turns left leaving the original course entering Bindura town center. From Bindura this road runs Shamva Road to Shamva about 27 km east where it intersects with the A13 Highway.

17°18′15″S 31°19′39″E

== Tollgates ==
A11 is tolled at Toll Plaza number: 33 at Mfurudzi the between 112 and 112.24 km from Bindura.

== See also ==
- ZINARA
- Transport in Zimbabwe
- A12 Highway
- A13 Highway
