= A13 road (Zimbabwe) =

Road in Zimbabwe

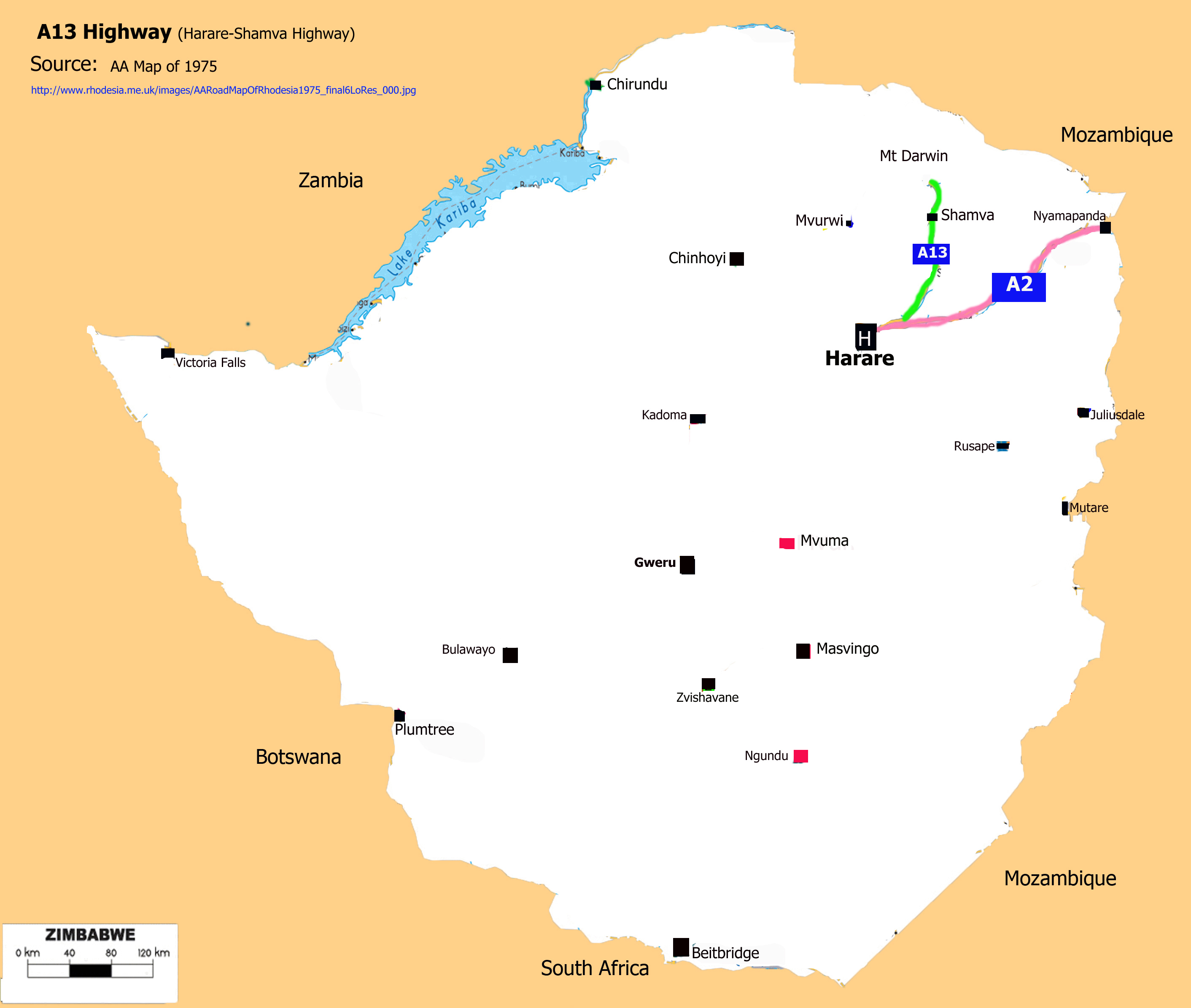

Location
- Country: Zimbabwe

Highway system
- Transport in Zimbabwe

A13 Highway is a busy road in Zimbabwe running from Enterprise Road, Harare to Shamva, Madziwa Mine and through to Gora Turn-off on the A11 Highway towards Wimbo Shrine, Mt Darwin.

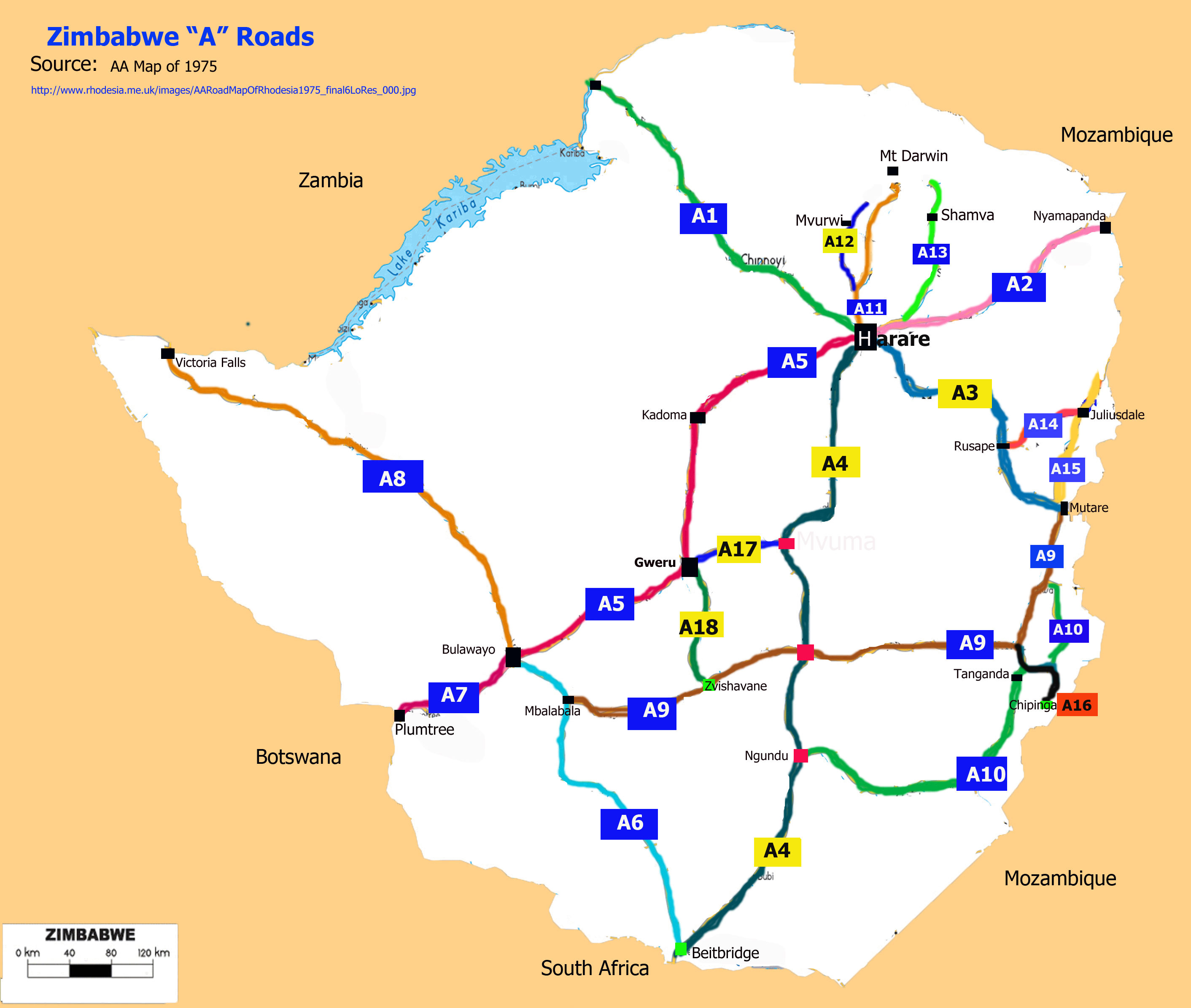
Zimbabwe "A" classified roads as of 1975

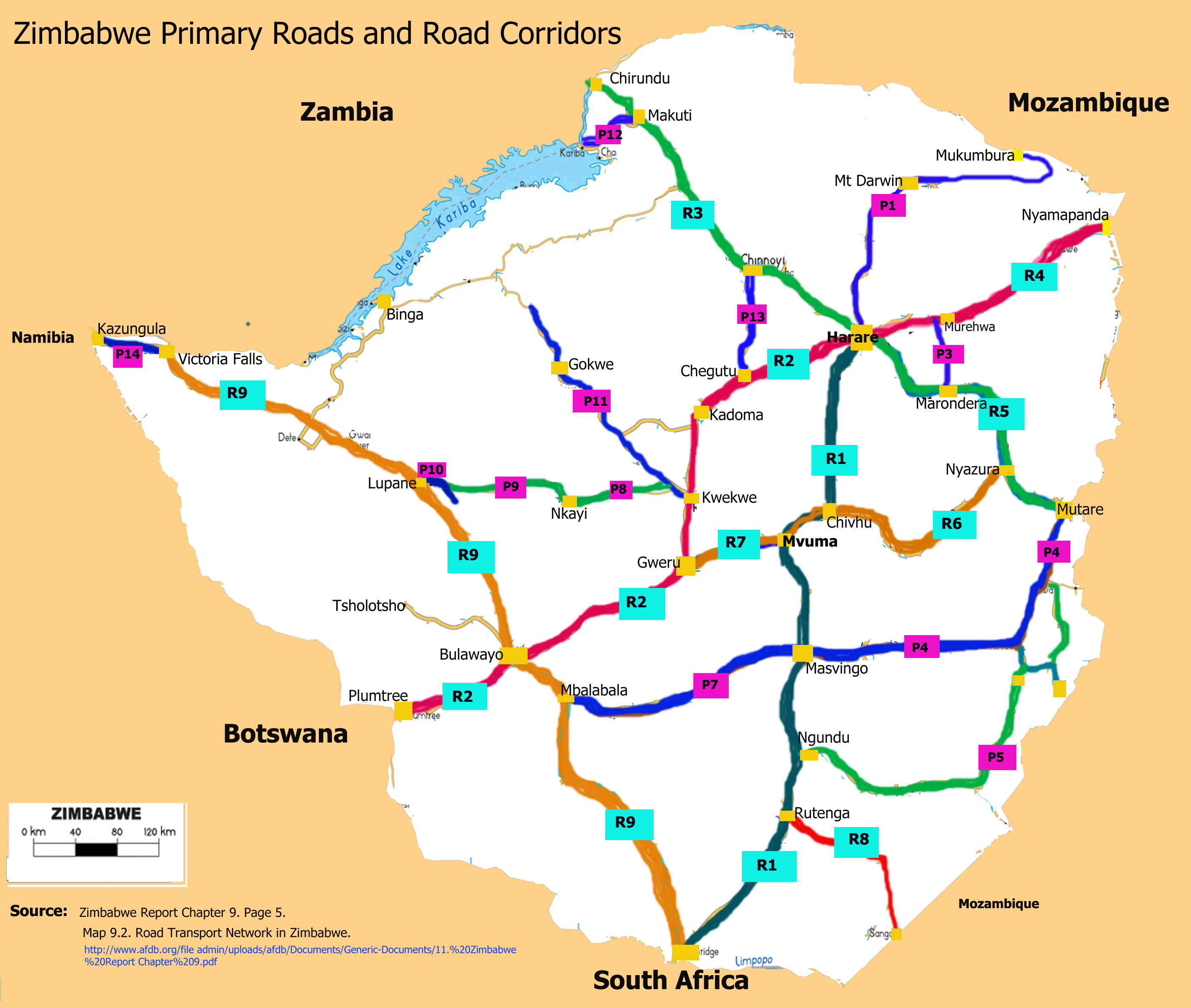
Zimbabwe Primary Roads

== Sources ==
The A13 Highway begins from Enterprise Road, 21 km from Harare and 200 metres past Enterprise Toll Plaza. Here Enterprise Road sends out two roads in a "Y" junction formation; the A2 to the right hand to Nyamapanda and the A13 Highway turning left towards Shamva. ( 17°44′14″S 30°12′17″E )

== Operations ==
The highway is used most by traffic serving Harare, Shamva and Madziwa Mines. At Shamva the railway line from Bindura protrudes from the right but doesn't meet with the highway.

After Shamva town, the tar road narrows to one lane, this is only for a section of approximately 2 km and there is another 1 km narrow section further on. The remainder of the main road is wide tar.

The road runs through Chief Bushu's location to Madziwa Mine 23 km past Shamva. The tar ends about 2 km after the defunct Madziwa Mine. A gravel road continues to Gora Turn-off on the Bindura-Mount Darwin Highway.

== Junctions ==
- Ewanrigg Turn-off.

Turns right at 15.2 km from the source Enterprise Road "Y" junction. Ewanrigg Botanical Gardens 3 km on this right turn.

- Bally Vaughan Animal Sanctuary Turn.

A Service Road turns here at 21.4 km to Bally Vaughn entrance on the left.

- Murimuragwe Rock Art Turn-off.

Turns left at 38.8 km from the source.

- Bindura Turn-off.

Turns left at 68.6 km from source.

- Mupfurudzi Turn-off. 100 km.

== Bridges ==
- Mushambanyama River at Shamva
- Mazowe River after Shamva at 74 km.
- Zirungurira River
- Mufurudzi River at 94.2 km from source; about 24 km past Shamva.

== See also ==
- A2 Highway
- A11 Highway
- ZINARA
- Transport in Zimbabwe
