= James Makamba =

Zimbabwean pioneer

Dr. James Makamba
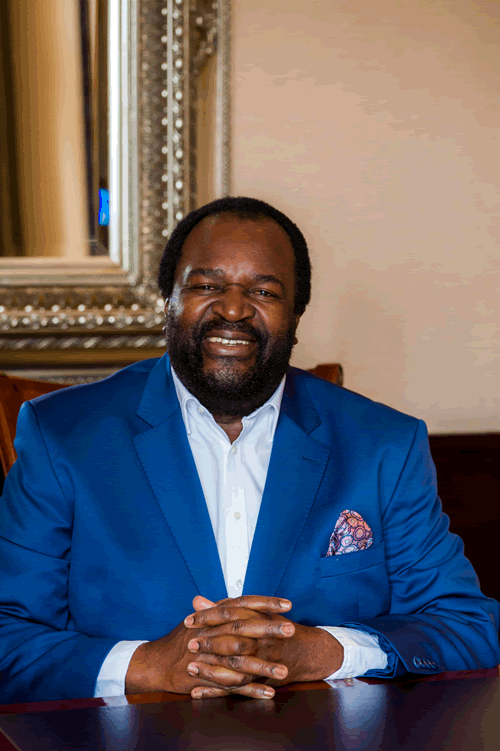
- Born: 1 January 1952 (age 74); Shamva District, Southern Rhodesia
- Occupations: Businessman, Philanthropist, Broadcaster, Politician
- Website: www.drjamesmakamba.com

James Makamba (born 1 January 1952) is a Zimbabwean commercial broadcaster, businessman, politician, philanthropist and father of late Zimbabwean media personality Zororo Makamba. Makamba currently has interests in the retail, telecommunications, mining, agricultural, property and professional consultancy sectors, digital publishing and philanthropy. He sits on the boards of IBBAMO Foundation, JHL Investments, Thurlow & Company, the Kestrel Corporation (Pty) Ltd, African Business Connect, Makamba & Associates, Telecel Zimbabwe and Anglo African Minerals.

Makamba holds a master's degree in Business Administration from California Coast University. In 2012, James Makamba was awarded an honorary doctorate in Business Leadership from St Linus University, Dominica.

Makamba is married to Irene Makamba. They have 4 children.

== Early life and education ==
Makamba was born in the Shamva District of Zimbabwe (then Southern Rhodesia). Makamba was the youngest of ten children of Jinja Makamba a retired police officer and Veronica Mudungwe.

Before his family moved to the Chesa district, to Mount Darwin, Makamba attended the Mupfurudzi Primary School, along with Oliver ‘Tuku’ Mtukudzi, who became a globally renowned musician. After the move, Makamba attended the Kujuwara School near Mount Darwin and then one of his older brothers, Raphael, invited him to live with his family in Tomlinson Depot, Harare, where he finished his upper primary education. He then attended the Jesuit Mission School, in Bulawayo, for his secondary education where strict discipline, focus, and accountability were instilled.The Jesuit fathers suggested to Makamba that he study in Ireland to be a priest. Makamba considered the suggestion as young black Southern Rhodesians of the time had very few career options beyond teaching, nursing, and police work. A far bigger attraction, however, was the idea of international travel. Makamba, however, did not take up the opportunity to join the priesthood due to family obligations.

== Business career ==
=== Broadcasting ===
When Makamba left secondary school, he went to work in Harare at the Catholic Centre. In a neighboring building was a government organisation, Audio Visual Services, which was responsible for recording educational material for broadcast in schools. After he had observed a friend make recordings on several occasions, Makamba was asked to stand in for a voice-over artist who had not arrived for a particular session. This began a career in broadcasting that lasted several decades.

After a year of school broadcasts, Makamba became a commercial radio broadcaster for the Rhodesian Broadcasting Corporation (RBC), on Channel 2. Determined to be his own boss rather than an RBC employee, he set about sourcing businesses willing to sponsor programmes and then packaged their advertising with customer interviews and popular music. Because Motown was in vogue, Makamba sported the bellbottom trousers and enormous afro hairstyle of the time, aligning himself with the racial integration and equality that Motown represented by its crossover success. He soon became Southern Rhodesia's most popular DJ, running 28 radio shows a week and touring the country to run discothèques at events ranging from weddings to New Year's parties. He established his own company, Incentive Private Ltd.

When most of the white broadcasters left Southern Rhodesia in the lead-up to the country's independence, Makamba set up and became managing director of a consortium of black entrepreneurs in order to buy out the largest of the country's advertising production houses and rebrand it as Media Associates. In 1997, one of his companies leased Zimbabwe Broadcasting Corporation’s (ZBC’s) second colour television channel, turning it into the country’s first independent television station, known as Joy TV. The station’s licence was revoked in 2002 due to licensing complications. According to officials, government-licensed broadcasters were prohibited from leasing their frequencies to independent broadcasters.

=== M&M Products ===
Through his business network established during his time in commercial broadcasting, Makamba met Andrew Young who served as America’s Ambassador to the UN (under President Jimmy Carter) and later as the mayor of Atlanta. Young introduced Makamba to Thurman Mackenzie one of the co-founders of M&M Products the makers Sta-Sof-Fro and Sofn'Free. Makamba was awarded the sole distribution rights for the Southern African Development Community (SADC) region by Thurman McKenzie. Makamba was then introduced to Tiny Rowland, then Chief Executive of Lonrho, a London-based conglomerate with diverse interests across Africa. Lonhro became his partners in the M&M Products distribution venture.

=== Million Dollar Round Table ===
In the 1980s, one of South Africa’s oldest and largest financial services companies, Old Mutual, began an expansion drive in Europe, the United States, and Asia. Although it had opened an office in Southern Rhodesia in 1927, Old Mutual was not particularly active in the rest of sub-Saharan Africa. Makamba realised that the combination of Old Mutual’s new focus on expansion and its lack of penetration of the African market represented an enormous business opportunity. During the 1980s Makamba became a consultant, selling insurance and investment products to individuals and organisations on behalf of Old Mutual. Within a record eight months in 1980, he had generated one million American dollars’ worth of sales. According to research, most of the top insurance consultants globally reach the one million dollar target only in their 30 months in the business. As a consequence of his feat, Makamba qualified as a member of the Million Dollar Round Table (MDRT) Known as the premier association of financial professionals, the MDRT is an international, independent association of nearly 38,000 of the world's leading life insurance and financial services professionals from more than 450 companies in 79 countries. The MDRT requires its members to demonstrate exceptional professional knowledge, strict ethical conduct, and outstanding client service. MDRT membership is recognised internationally as the standard of sales excellence in the life insurance and financial services business Makamba was also consistently among Old Mutual's top 25 consultants.

=== Lonrho ===
Partnering with Makamba in setting up the M&M distributorship in Botswana had given Tiny Rowland insight into Makamba's negotiation and relationship-building. A few years later, Makamba was appointed to spearhead Lonrho, operations in Botswana serving as Deputy Chairman of the board under the supervision of Tiny Rowland. He also served as senior consultant to Lonrho Zimbabwe and Lonhro PL in London and later spent many years working from the Lonrho Plc. headquarters in Cheapside, London. Makamba was also engaged as a government relations consultant for Lonrho Plc. initiatives across Africa, among them promotion of the Mercedes-Benz franchise in sub-Saharan Africa, the establishment of tea plantations, the building of railways, and the development of tourism and agriculture. When Lonhro was appointed by Boeing to be their agent in Africa, Rowland appointed Makamba as Lonhro's sales executive for Boeing with the objective of using his vast pan-African business network. Makamba was then able to expand Boeing's share of the African market. His talent for pre-empting future trends also enabled him to guide the procurement panel at Air Zimbabwe into a choice of the Boeing 767 rather than the more obvious Boeing 747, because it had much lower running costs and would bolster the airline's profitability.

=== Telecel ===
Towards South Africa's Independence Makamba decided to set up a representative base in Sandton in Johannesburg, South Africa. In 1993, the Zimbabwean government awarded three cellular operator licenses. Makamba formed a consortium, made up of women's groups, miners and other indigenous and previously disadvantaged groupings, under the banner of the Empowerment Corporation Pvt Ltd. Through the Empowerment Corp he was able to partner with Telecel International, the first cellular services provider on the African continent. At inception in 1995, Makamba became chairman of both Telecel Zimbabwe as well as chairman of the consortium, Empowerment Corporation Pvt Ltd.

During his tenure at Telecel Zimbabwe and as a board member of Telecel International, Makamba developed an enduring friendship with Telecel International's founder, the late Miko Rwayitare. Congolese/Rwandan, Rwayitare brought cellular technology to Africa by obtaining the first concession in the Democratic Republic of Congo (then Zaire) and building it into the continent's largest cellular operation.

== Political career ==
When General Solomon Tapfumaneyi Mujuru retired from his post-independence position as commander of the Zimbabwe National Army, he went into business and farming. He chose Makamba to be one of his partners in businesses in Shamva and Bindura where Makamba would be elected to the Bindura Council. Makamba was later elected to the position of Town Board Chairman (akin to a mayor). He was then elected ZANU-PF Provincial Chairman for Mashonaland Central Province and later Member of Parliament for Mount Darwin constituency in 1995. He was also one of the businessmen who travelled internationally with President Robert Mugabe to promote investment in Zimbabwe. He resigned from public life to pursue his career as a government relations consultant for Lonrho Plc.
