= R4 road (Zimbabwe) =

Road in Zimbabwe

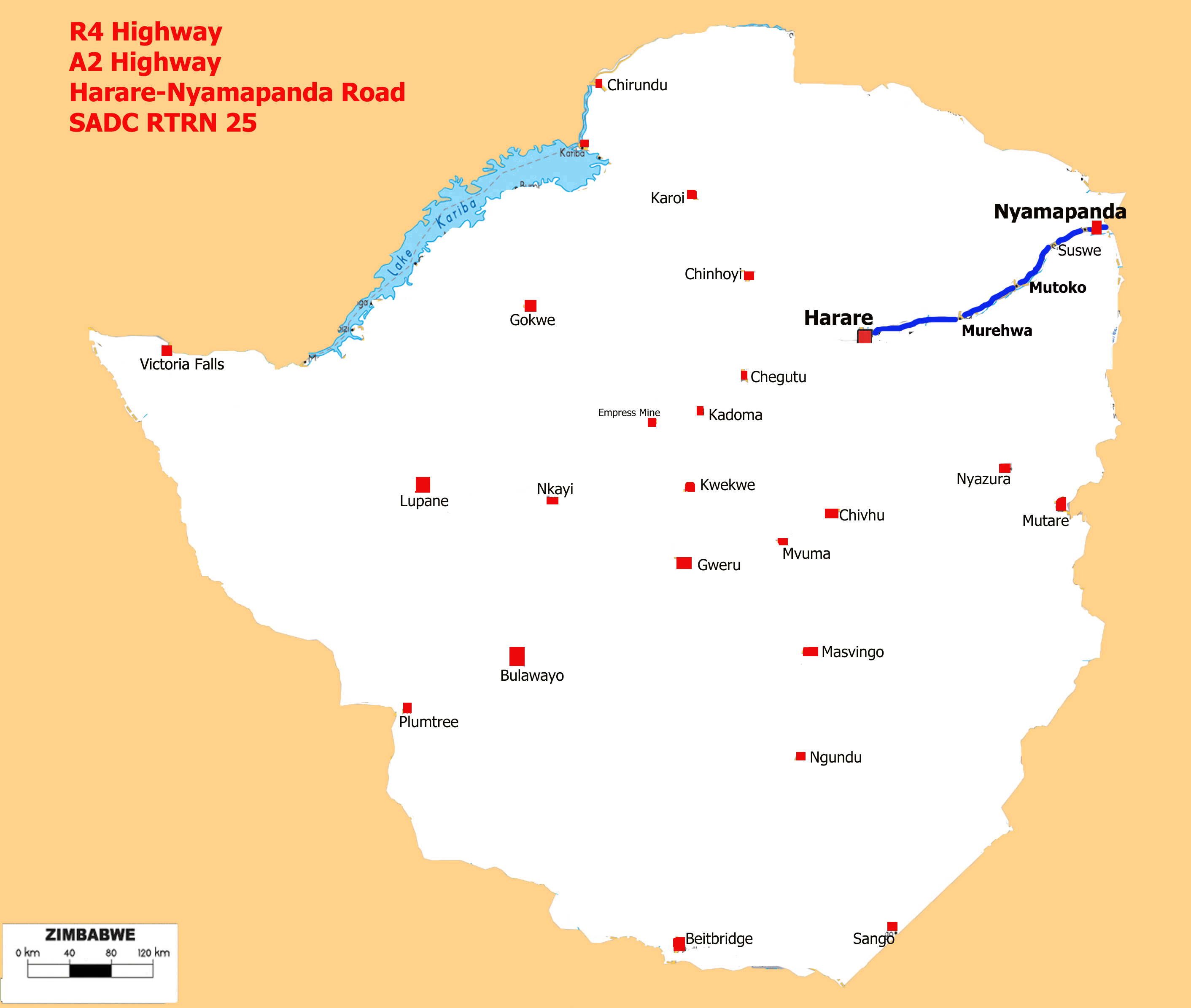

Location
- Country: Zimbabwe

Highway system
- Transport in Zimbabwe

The R4 Highway (previously known as the A2 Highway) is a primary road in Zimbabwe running from Harare to Nyamapanda at the border with Mozambique. The Mozambican side border post is called Cochemane. This is a busy entry point used by people travelling by road between South Africa, Malawi, Zimbabwe and Mozambique. It starts at intersection with Samora Machel Avenue; however Enterprise Road itself begins from the T-junction with Robert Mugabe Avenue, opposite the market in Eastlea, east of Simon Muzenda Street (Fourth Street) Road Port; a bus terminus for inter-regional buses.

The R4 Highway proper begins where Enterprise Road makes a Y junction sending out A13 Highway to the left hand side and the A2 Highway to the right or straight ahead. 17°44′14″S 31°12′17″E and it ends at the border with Mozambique. 16°57′49″S 32°51′41″E

== Background ==
The 238 km long R4 Highway is popularly known as Mutoko Road and sometimes called Nyamapanda Road.

The R4 Highway was constructed in 1980. Before 1980 the road was partly gravel towards Nyamapanda. The road is part of the regional trunk road network linking Zimbabwe to the rest of the SADC and COMESA regions through Mozambique.

== Operations ==
The R4 Highway known as Mutoko Road, Mutoko is popular as a mango and tomato supplier to Mbare Musika the largest green market in Harare and all Zimbabwe.

The border post known as the “Nyamapande Customs Post” is located close to the town of Nyamapanda in Mashonaland East Province. The town was named after the Nyamapanda River. The Mozambican side is called Cochemane. In Mozambique the R4 becomes Route 103 to Tete en route to Malawi.

=== Regional Road Corridor ===
As a regional corridor the R4 relays traffic from South Africa to Malawi. From Harare to Lilongwe using the R4 Highway and Mozambique's Route 222 the distance is about 741 km (460.4 miles).

This is SADC Route 25 from Durban to Tanzania via Zimbabwe, Mozambique and Malawi and in Zimbabwe the corridor is 812 km long.

- N1 Highway from Gauteng Province to Beitbridge border with Zimbabwe.
- R1/A4 takes from Beitbridge to Harare.
- Then the R4/A2 from Harare to Nyamapanda border with Mozambique
- From Nyamapanda the highway follows Route 103 to Mwanza (via Tete) border between Mozambique and Malawi.
- From Mwanza M6 / M1 North to Lilongwe.

== Junctions ==
- Right at the end of Enterprise Road where A2 Road begins the A13 Highway to Shamva and through to Madziwa Mine branches left (north).
- Murehwa to Marondera (Juru-Marondera Road) 47 km.
- Murehwa T/off. 82 km from Harare. Murehwa-Nyadhire Road branches left to Murehwa about 2 km ahead,

• Kotwa. 17°00′00″S 32°40′19″E

== Waypoints ==
- Murehwa 82 km (the center is 2 km off-road to the right).
- Mutoko 56 km from Murehwa and 95 km before Nyamapanda border post.
- Kotwa: is the last waypoint nearer to Nyamapanda. It is just off the highway to the left. 16°59′27″S 32°40′14″E
- Nyamapanda Town 238 km from Harare

== See also ==
- ZINARA
- Transport in Zimbabwe
- Trans-African Highway network
- Beira-Lobito Corridor
