= Jah Prayzah =

Zimbabwean musical artist

- Also known as: Masoja, JP ,Wagwizi
- Born: Mukudzeyi Sean Mukombe; 4 July 1987 (age 39); Uzumba-Maramba-Pfungwe, Zimbabwe
- Origin: Harare, Zimbabwe
- Genres: Afrobeats; Afro-jazz; Zimbabwean music; reggae
- Occupations: Musician; philanthropist; author; comedian; brand ambassador; artist manager
- Instruments: Vocals; mbira
- Label: JP Studios
- Website: www.jahprayzah.com

Mukudzeyi Mukombe (born 4 July 1987), better known as Jah Prayzah, is a Zimbabwean contemporary musician and lead member of the band Third Generation. Regarded as the most prolific musician of his generation in the country and an exceptional figure in the African music scenery, he was popularly referred to by fans and media as "Masoja", the Shona word for "soldier", a name he earned mostly because of his signature band uniform of military regalia. The name "Jah Prayzah" comes from his name, "Mukudzeyi", which means "Praise Him".

== Early life and education ==
Mukombe was born and raised in Uzumba, Murehwa, a small town about 95 km from Harare, capital of Zimbabwe. He is the last born in a family of five. As a young boy he liked writing, reading his father's Shona novels, swimming in the river with friends, and hunting in the forests. Time and again he would come back home with his shorts torn from all the climbing and adventure. Most importantly, he liked to sing. He nurtured this habit through singing at school assemblies and at church, as well as playing the mbira with his teacher Mupa Musimbe. As he grew older and as his mbira skills improved, Mukombe felt confident and inspired to pursue his interests in music. People began to realize his natural gift in music and language, and encouraged him to be serious with it.

Mukombe, attended Musamhi Primary School and later Musamhi High School in Mutoko, in Mashonaland East Province. He then relocated to Harare where he stayed with his uncle and eventually completed his ordinary and advanced levels of education in Harare.

== Music career ==
Mukombe's first experience with composing music was during his early years of high school. He started to record dancehall and reggae tracks with his friends with some tracks creating a vibe in the suburb, but failing to hit the national music scene. He later recorded contemporary music and afro jazztracks with DJ Thando and other local producers, releasing singles such as "Sorry Mama" and "Seiko".

He started his career in 2005. In 2007, he released his first commercially launched album, Sungano. He went on to release two more albums, Rudo neRunyararo and Ngwarira Kuparara. The latter was commercially successful and contained the singles "Maria" and "Dande", the latter of which featured Chiwoniso Maraire. Ngwarira Kuparara was commercially successful, and he was offered a contract for the Wednesday slots at a local Harare pub called Jazz 105.

In 2013, he released his fourth album Tsviriyo and won a NAMA award for song of the Year for the song "Gotchi Gotchi". In 2014, he released Kumbumura Mhute. In the same year he won five NAMA awards and two ZIMA awards.

In 2015, he opened a new studio and released his sixth studio album, Jerusarema.

His most notable work is a collaboration with award-winning Tanzanian artist Diamond Platnumz on his hit song "Watora Mari", which reached over a million views on YouTube in less than a month after its release. "Watora Mari" has enjoyed massive airplay on MTV base and Trace Africa.

On 2 November 2018, Mukombe launched his eighth studio album titled Chitubu. The album features collaborations from well known African artists such as Patoranking and Sauti Sol. In 2019, Mukombe was nominated for the Best Male Artist in Southern Africa in the All Africa Music Awards (AFRIMAs).

In April 2023, it was announced that Mukombe was going to release not one, but two albums at the same time. The albums were launched in Harare and Bulawayo with record setting concerts on May 12 and 13 respectively.

On May 3rd 2025 he launched another album titled 'Ndini Mukudzeyi' which was officially launched by renowned speaker and TV host Rebecca Chisamba at Old Hararians Sports Club.

== Discography ==
=== Albums ===
- Ndini Mukudzeyi (2025)
- Chiremerera (2023)
- Maita Baba (2023)
- Gwara (2021)
- Hokoyo (2020)
- Chitubu (2018)
- Kutonga Kwaro (2017)
- Mdhara Vachauya (2016)
- Jerusarema (2015)
- Kumbumura Mhute (2014)
- Tsviriyo (2013)
- Ngwarira Kuparara (2012)
- Sungano Yerudo (2010)
- Rudo Nerunyararo (2007)

== Awards ==
- MTV African Music Award 2016 – Listener's Choice Award
- NAMA 2013 Award for Song of the Year, "Gochi Gochi"
- 2013 Zimbabwe Peace ambassador award
- NAMA 2014 Awards – Outstanding Album, Tsviriyo
- NAMA 2014 Awards – Outstanding Song, "Tsviriyo"
- NAMA 2014 Awards – Outstanding Male Artist, Jah Prayzah
- NAMA 2014 Awards – Outstanding Video, "Mwanasikana"
- NAMA 2014 Awards – People's Choice, Jah Prayzah
- Zim Dream Online award- 2014
- NAMA 2016 Awards – Album of the Year
- NAMA 2016 Awards – Outstanding Male Artist
- ZIMA 2016 Awards – Artist of the Year
- ZIMA 2016 Awards – Traditional Song of the Year "Jerusarema"
- ZIMA 2016 Awards – Album of the Year, Jerusarema
- ZIMA 2016 Awards – Collaboration of the Year, "Kure Kure" ft. Ammara Brown
- Zimbabwe Achievers Awards – Best International Music Artist and he also performed with Nygyly Munyuki
- Zimbabwe Business Awards 2017 – Entertainment Entrepreneur of the Year
- National Arts Merit Awards (NAMA) 2018 – Artist of the year
- African Entertainment Awards, USA (AEAUSA) 2020 – Entertainer of the Year category nomination
- 2023 Africa Entertainment Awards, USA (AEAUSA) - Best male artist in East, South and North Africa
- 2024 NAMA best album of the year
- 2024 AEAUSA best album of the year
- 2025 NAMA best album of the year ( NDINI MUKUDZEYI)
- 2025 NAMA outstanding musician of the year

== Personal life ==
He is married to Rufaro Chiworeso, whom he sang about in his song Rufaro. They have a son and three daughters. He also has a son from his previous marriage. In 2012, Mukombe revealed that his secret of success comes from his mother after she blessed him after giving her a US$7,000 as a present on a birthday party in 2012. Jah Prayzah's networth in 2022 is estimated at US 5,000,000

== Tours ==
Mukombe has had many international shows in Australia, the United Kingdom, Canada, the United States, China and South Africa.
