= Makamba =

Makamba may refer to:

People:

- James Makamba
- January Makamba
- Yusuf Makamba
- Zororo Makamba

Place:

- Makamba Province, Burundi
- Makamba Commune, Burundi
- Makamba, Burundi
