= Artwell Nyambanje =

Zimbabwean cricketer (born 1991)

Personal information
- Born: February 10, 1991 (age 35); Bindura, Zimbabwe
- Batting: Right-handed
- Bowling: Right-arm leg spin

Career statistics
Competition	List A
Matches	1
Runs scored	–
Batting average	–
100s/50s	–
Top score	–
Balls bowled	18
Wickets	0
Bowling average	–
5 wickets in innings	–
10 wickets in match	–
Best bowling	–
Catches/stumpings	1/–
- Source: Cricinfo, 27 January 2018

Artwell Nyambanje (born 10 February 1991) is a Zimbabwean cricketer, who bats right-handed and bowls leg spin. He made his List A debut in his only List A appearance for Mid West Rhinos against Southern Rocks in 2012.
