= Mount Darwin Airport =

Airport in Zimbabwe

- IATA: none; ICAO: FVMD

Summary
- Airport type: Military
- Serves: Mount Darwin
- Elevation AMSL: 3,240 ft / 988 m
- Coordinates: 16°46′10″S 31°33′35″E

Map
- Location of the airport in Zimbabwe

Runways
Direction	Length		Surface
Direction	m	ft	Surface
10/28	1,100	3,609	Asphalt
- Sources: GCM Google Maps WAD

Mount Darwin Airport (ICAO: FVMD), designated as Forward Air Field 4 (FAF) during the Rhodesian Bush War, is an airport serving Mount Darwin, in Mashonaland Central Province, Zimbabwe. The runway is 1.6 kilometres (0.99 mi) west of the town, and has a 60 metres (200 ft) paved overrun on each end.

== See also ==
- Transport in Zimbabwe
- List of airports in Zimbabwe
