= Bumhururu =

Lake in Zimbabwe

- Location within Zimbabwe Location within Africa
- Location: Mashonaland Central Province
- Coordinates: 16°40′34″S 031°04′10″E

Bumhururu is a lake in the Mashonaland Central Province of Zimbabwe.
