= Centenary District =

- District
- Location within Zimbabwe
- Coordinates: 16°25′0″S 31°10′0″E
- Country: Zimbabwe
- Province: Mashonaland Central
- District: Centenary
- Elevation: 474 m (1,555 ft)

Population
  - Total: 121,127
- Time zone: UTC+1 (CET)
  - Summer (DST): UTC+1 (CEST)

Centenary is one of seven districts in the Mashonaland Central province of Zimbabwe. The district's capital is the town of Centenary.
