= R4 =

R4, R04, R.4, R-4, or R/4 may refer to:

== Military ==
=== Aircraft ===
- Caudron R.4, World War I French reconnaissance aircraft, first flown in 1915
- Curtiss R-4, air ambulance version of the American Curtiss Model R utility aircraft, first flown in 1915
- Sikorsky R-4, American helicopter, first flown in 1942

=== Ships ===
- HMCS Cayuga (R04), Royal Canadian Navy destroyer
- USS R-4 (SS-81), U.S. Navy submarine

=== Weapons ===
- R4 assault rifle, produced by South African manufacturer Vektor
- Remington R4 carbine, assault rifle used by the Philippine Marine Corps
- Bisnovat R-4, Soviet missile

=== Other military ===
- Plan R 4, the World War II British plan for an invasion of the neutral state of Norway in April 1940

== Science ==
- R4, designation of risk phrase "Forms very sensitive explosive metallic compounds"
- R4 nuclear reactor, the fourth nuclear reactor built in Sweden
- Exotic R^{4}, in mathematics, a differentiable manifold

== Transportation ==
=== Cars ===
- R4, abbreviation for rear-engine, four-wheel drive layout
- R4, a sub-class of Group R rally cars
- Jaguar R4, Jaguar Racing's car for the 2003 Formula One season
- McRae R4, a rally car designed in part by Colin McRae
- Renault R4, alternative name for the Renault 4
- Suzuki GSX-R/4, a concept car made by Suzuki in 2001

=== Roads ===
- R4 ring road in Ghent, Belgium
- R4 expressway (Czech Republic)
- R4 expressway (Slovakia)
- R-4 motorway (Spain)
- R4 road (Zimbabwe), a road connecting Harare and Nyamapanda
- Radial Road 4 or R-4, an arterial road of Manila, Philippines

=== Other transportation ===
- R4 (Canberra), a bus route in Canberra, Australia
- R4 (New York City Subway car)
- R4 (RER Vaud), an S-Bahn line in the canton of Vaud
- R4 (Rodalies de Catalunya), a commuter rail line in Barcelona, Catalonia, Spain
- R4 41st Avenue RapidBus, an express bus service in Vancouver, BC, Canada

== Video games ==
- R4: Ridge Racer Type 4, a racing game for Sony PlayStation, developed by Namco
- Rush Rush Rally Racing, a racing game for Sega Dreamcast, developed by Senile Team
- R4 cartridge, a Nintendo DS flash cartridge

== Other uses ==
- Regional Four, an informal diplomatic forum of Turkey, Egypt, Pakistan and Saudi Arabia
- BBC Radio 4 the premier BBC speech radio station
- R4, a building in the Norwegian Government quarter (Norw. Regjeringskvartalet)
- Region 4, the DVD region code for most of Mexico, Central America, South America, Australia, New Zealand, Oceania

== See also ==
- 4R (disambiguation)
