= Mai Chaza =

Zimbabwean religious leader and prophetess

Matenga
- Born: Theresa Nyamushanya; 1914; Buhera, Zimbabwe
- Died: 26 December 1960 (aged 45–46); Zvimba, Zimbabwe
- Occupations: Church leader, prophetess
- Known for: Founder, Guta raJehovah movement

Mai Chaza (Note: Meaning "Mother Chaza"; her real name was Theresa Nyamushanya.) (1914 – 25 December 1960) was a Zimbabwean church leader and prophetess who broke away from the Methodist Church in the 1950s to found her own faith-healing movement, Guta raJehovah (City of God), which was also known as the "Mai Chaza Church". Born Theresa Nyamushanya, she was often referred to by her thousands of followers as Matenga ("The Heavens"). Her church established a large commune where she lived until her death. Although it was influential for a time, since her death her church has shrunk in numbers, but continues to attract sick people looking for spiritual healing.

== Biography ==
=== Early life and beginning of prophetic career ===
Mai Chaza was born in 1914 to the Nyamushanya family and married Chiduza Chaza of Wedza, by whom she had six children. A devout Methodist, she was originally active within the ruwadzano, the Methodist Church's prayer groups in Zimbabwe. In 1948 she was driven from her home in the mining town of Concession after being accused of causing the death of a sister-in-law through witchcraft. She moved to the township of Highfield in Salisbury (now Harare), where she was given shelter by another Methodist family. She became ill around 1953–54 and was thought to have become deranged before falling into a coma. Her husband divorced her and returned her to her family.

When Mai Chaza recovered, she was hailed as having returned from the dead. She announced that she had been instructed by God to become a faith healer, live a celibate life, and heal the sick, especially barren women. She also claimed to have been reconciled with the spirit of her dead sister-in-law. She began healing people and preaching the word of God. The Methodist hierarchy ordered her to stop and refused her request to have her own preaching circuit. She responded by establishing her own unauthorised circuit Guta Ra Jehovah.

=== Establishment of the City of God ===
In 1954, Mai Chaza relocated to Kandava's village within the Seke Reserve in Mashonaland, about 100 miles (160 km) south-east of Harare. She quickly attracted numerous followers; by the end of 1954, the village, built on a site measuring only one acre, had grown to 615 domiciles with around 2,500 inhabitants. They called it the Guta raJehovah or City of God. In her new identity as a prophetess, the self-proclaimed Mutumwa ("Messenger [of God]" or "Angel"), Mai Chaza received thousands of supplicants wishing to find cures for their medical conditions. She was hailed by her followers as Mai Muponesi ("Mother Saviour), Matenga ("Heavens"), Gwayana ("Lamb"), or as an African reappearance of Christ. Satellite "Cities of Jehovah" with healing centres were established in several locations around Rhodesia, and also in neighbouring Bechuanaland (now Botswana). She was said to have summoned the spirits of the 19th century Ndebele king Lobengula, the historical spirit medium Chaminuka and the founder of Rhodesia, Cecil Rhodes, and to have released them from purgatory and reconciled them.

Mai Chaza's style of worship mixed Methodism with African traditional healing. Her followers numbered at least 60,000 people by the end of the 1950s and were drawn largely from the ranks of the poor and uneducated. They adopted a distinctive uniform, worn by both men and women, of khaki tunics and shorts with red belts. They were inducted into the Guta by Mai Chaza personally. There was no ceremony of baptism; instead, they had to confess their sins and be touched on the head by Mai Chaza.

Within a few years of the Guta raJehovah being founded, satellite "Cities of Jehovah" with healing centres were established in several locations around Rhodesia. A 1954 visitor to the Guta described the scene:

The touching strains of a Methodist hymn greeted us and we saw – in a grass enclosure – hundreds of women swaying and clapping hands. In their midst was a long line of women, sitting on the ground ... From one end came Mai Chaza, touching and praying. She touched and squeezed their bellies. These were barren women and the ceremony was intended to make them fruitful. Headman Chiota told us that within the last few weeks no less than 68 women who had not given birth for a very long time were now expecting.

Mai Chaza was credited with having cured numerous women, who stayed in the Guta for periods of between six months and two years. Not all were cured, however; such failures were claimed to be the result of the woman lacking sufficient commitment to God and her failure to fully confess her previous sins. Followers were instructed that they had to confess every sin they had committed in their entire lives, from childhood up to the point of approaching Mai Chaza. They also had to surrender objects associated with sin, such as alcohol, money and tobacco, as well as "pagan" artefacts such as traditional medicines and charms. Members of the Guta were thus expected to be spiritually pure. They were also expected to be religiously exclusive, shunning prayers with members of other denominations. Mai Chaza personally renounced marriage and sexual relationships; as Toyin Falola and Nana Akua Amponsah note, this was indicative of the "extraordinary measures" that a woman engaged in spiritual healing was expected to take in order to "substantiate her right to heal and lead".

Her words and deeds were recorded in the Guta raJehovah Bible by her followers. This Bible was seen as supplanting the New Testament, and depicts Mai Chaza as a member of the Trinity. Women who were unable to conceive travelled to her church so that they could be touched by Mai Chaza, in the hope of being able to have a successful pregnancy. Individuals regarded as possessed by demons would fall to the floor and acknowledge the authority of the Holy Spirit.

=== Influence ===
Mai Chaza's movement posed problems for the mainstream Methodist Church, which was torn between a wish not to alienate her followers – many of whom saw her meetings as being authorised by the church – and the theological need to prevent her church from straying too far from official church doctrine. The Methodist Church instead took a middle path in the hope that the movement could facilitate a "revival within the Church" and advised tolerance and patience towards it.

Elsewhere, the Guta raJehovah movement was debated and criticised in the pages of journals such as the African Weekly. Mai Chaza's success in attracting thousands of followers was criticised as a wasteful diversion of valuable man-hours, while African opinion leaders such as Charles Mzingeli scorned the idea that barrenness could be cured through repenting sins. Stories emerged accusing Mai Chaza of exploiting her followers and enriching herself.

The rapid growth of her church necessitated a move first to Mount Dangare in the Zimunya Communal Lands near Umtali (now Mutare, in eastern Zimbabwe) in 1956, and subsequently to Zvimba District north-west of Harare, in 1960. It was at Zvimba that Mai Chaza died on 25 December 1960. According to legend, she disappeared from her coffin as it was being lowered into the grave, thus fulfilling her statement that she would "not have a grave here on earth".

After her death, her spirit was claimed to have reincarnated in Taxwell Tayali, of Zambian origin, who took the title Vamatenga ("someone from heaven"). He was, however, less influential and the church's numbers have shrunk since Mai Chaza's death.
