= Shona language =

Bantu language spoken in Zimbabwe and Mozambique

Shona
- chiShona
- Native to: Zimbabwe; Mozambique
- Region: Southern Africa
- Ethnicity: Shona
- Speakers: L1: 9.6 million (2010–2023); L2: 4.5 million (2023); Total: 14 million (2010–2023)
- Language family: Niger–Congo?: Atlantic–Congo; Volta-Congo; Benue–Congo; Bantoid; Southern Bantoid; Bantu; Southern Bantu; Shona languages (S.10); Shona
- Dialects: Korekore; Zezuru; Manyika; Karanga; Ndau
- Writing system: Latin script (Shona alphabet); Shona Braille; Ditema tsa Dinoko

Official status
- Official language in: Zimbabwe
- Recognised minority language in: Mozambique

Language codes
- ISO 639-1: sn
- ISO 639-2: sna
- ISO 639-3: Variously: sna – Shona twl – Tavara mxc – Manyika twx – Tewe (Manyika)
- Glottolog: core1255 Core Shona tawa1270 Tawara
- Guthrie code: S.7–10
- Linguasphere: 99-AUT-a = List: 99-AUT-aa (standardised Shona)+ 99-AUT-ab (chiKorekore incl. varieties -aba to; -abk)+ 99-AUT-ac (chiZezuru -aca..-ack)+ 99-AUT-ad (north chiManyika -ada..-adk)+ 99-AUT-ae (central chiManyika -aea..-aeg)+ 99-AUT-af (chiKaranga -afa..-aff)+ 99-AUT-ag (chiNdau -aga..-age)+ 99-AUT-ah (chiShanga)+ 99-AUT-ai (chiKalanga)+ 99-AUT-aj (chiNambya -aja..-ajc)+ 99-AUT-ak (chiLilima -aka..-akf)

- Person: MuShona
- People: VaShona
- Language: chiShona
- Country: Vukaranga

Shona (/ˈʃoʊnə/ SHOH-nə; endonym: chiShona [tʃiʃona]) is a Bantu language spoken by the Shona people of Zimbabwe and Mozambique. The term is variously used to collectively describe all the Central Shonic varieties (comprising Zezuru, Manyika, Korekore and Karanga or Ndau) or specifically Standard Shona, a variety codified in the mid-20th century. By the broader definition, the language is spoken by over 14 million people.

The larger group of historically related languages—called Shona or Shonic languages by linguists—also includes Ndau (Eastern Shona) and Kalanga (Western Shona). In Guthrie's classification of Bantu languages, zone S.10 designates the Shonic group.

== Instruction ==
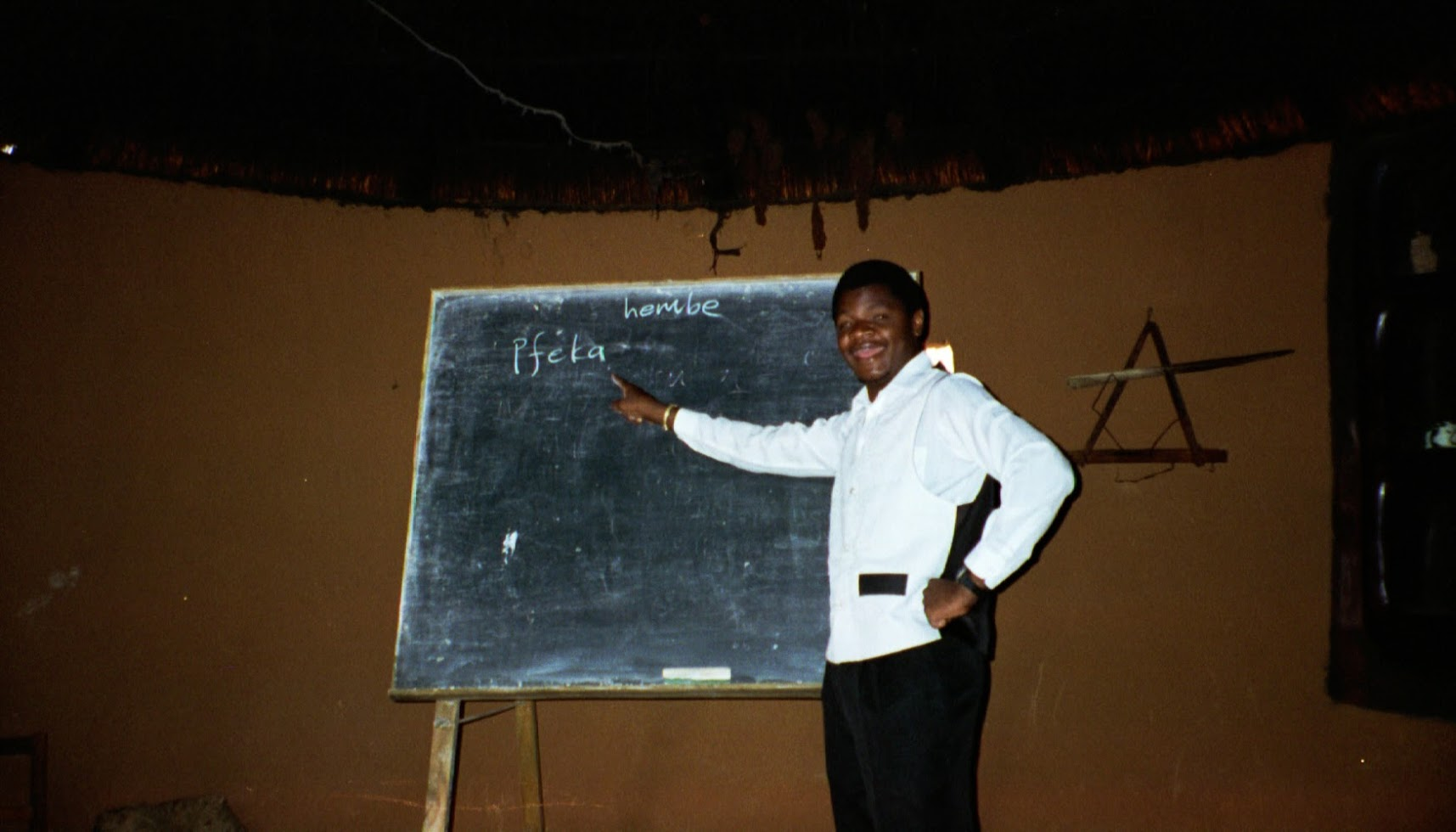
Teacher Ignatio Chiyaka teaching the Shona language to U.S. Peace Corps volunteers in Zhombe, Zimbabwe. The words on the blackboard are pfeka ("dress self") and hembe ("shirt").

Shona is a written standard language with an orthography and grammar that were codified during the early 20th century and fixed in the 1950s. In the 1920s, the Rhodesian administration was faced with the challenge of preparing schoolbooks and other materials in the various languages and dialects and requested the recommendation of South African linguist Clement Doke. The language is now described through monolingual and bilingual dictionaries (chiefly Shona – English).

The first novel in Shona, Solomon Mutswairo's Feso, was published in 1957. Subsequently, hundreds of novels, short story collections and poetry volumes in Shona have appeared. Shona is taught in the schools, but after the first few grades it is not the general medium of instruction for subjects other than Shona grammar and literature.

== Varieties ==
The last systematic study of varieties and sub-varieties of the Central Shona dialect continuum was that done by Clement Doke in 1930, so many sub-varieties are no longer functional and should be treated with caution.

According to information from Ethnologue:

- S14 Karanga (Chikaranga). Spoken in southern Zimbabwe, near Masvingo. It is also mostly spoken in the Midlands province, most notably in Gutu, Masvingo, Mberengwa and Zvishavane districts. Some people refer it as Vhitori.

Subdialects: Duma, Jena, Mhari (Mari), Ngova, Venda (not the Venda language), Govera.

- S12 Zezuru (Chizezuru, Bazezuru, Bazuzura, Mazizuru, Vazezuru, Wazezuru). Spoken in Mashonaland east and central Zimbabwe, near Harare. The standard language. Standard Shona is based on Zezuru, and this has led to the decline and possible extinction of other related languages now referred to as "Shona dialects".

Subdialects: Shawasha, Gova, Mbire, Tsunga, Kachikwakwa, Harava, Nohwe, Njanja, Nobvu, Kwazvimba (Zvimba).

- S11 Korekore (Northern Shona, Goba, Gova, Shangwe). Spoken in northern Zimbabwe, Mvurwi, Bindura, Mt Darwin, Guruve, Chiweshe, Centenary.

Subdialects: Gova, Tande, Tavara, Nyongwe, Pfunde, Shangwe.

Languages with partial intelligibility with Central Shona, of which the speakers are considered to be ethnically Shona, are the S15 Ndau language, spoken in Mozambique and Zimbabwe, and the S13 Manyika language, spoken in eastern Zimbabwe, near Mutare specifically Chipinge. Ndau literacy material has been introduced into primary schools. Maho (2009) recognizes Korekore, Zezuru, Manyika, Karanga, and Ndau as distinct languages within the Shona cluster.

== Phonology ==
Shona allows only open syllables. Consonants belong to the next syllable. For example, mangwanani ("morning") is syllabified as [ma.ᵑɡwa.na.ni]; Zimbabwe is [zi.ᵐba.ɓwe]. Shona is written with a phonemic orthography, with only slightly different pronunciation or grammatical differences according to variety. Shona has two tones, a high and a low tone, but these tones are not indicated in the standard writing system.

=== Vowels ===
	Front	Central	Back
Close	i		u
Mid	e		o
Open		a	

Shona has a simple 5-vowel system. This inventory is quite common cross-linguistically, with similar systems occurring in Greek, Spanish, Tagalog, Swahili and Japanese. Each vowel is pronounced separately even if they fall in succession. For example, Unoenda kupi? ("Where do you go?") is pronounced [u.no.e.ⁿda ku.pi].

=== Consonants ===
The consonant phonemes of Shona are:

		Bilabial	Labio- dental	Alveolar			Palatal (-alveolar)	Velar	Glottal
		Bilabial	Labio- dental	plain	sibilant		Palatal (-alveolar)	Velar	Glottal
		Bilabial	Labio- dental	plain	plain	whistled	Palatal (-alveolar)	Velar	Glottal
Nasal	plain	m		n			ɲ	ŋ	
Nasal	breathy	m̤	mʋ̤	n̤					
Plosive/ Affricate	voiceless	p	p͡f	t	t͡s	t͡sᶲ	t͡ʃ	k	
Plosive/ Affricate	breathy	b̤	b͡v̤	d̤	d͡z̤	d͡z̤ᵝ	d͡ʒ̤	ɡ̤	
Plosive/ Affricate	prenasal	ᵐb		ⁿd			ⁿd͡ʒ̤	ᵑɡ	
Implosive		ɓ		ɗ					
Fricative	voiceless		f		s	sᶲ	ʃ		
Fricative	breathy		v̤		z̤	z̤ᵝ	ʒ̤		ɦ
Fricative	prenasal				ⁿz̤	ⁿz̤ᵝ			
Sonorant			ʋ	r			j	w	

=== Whistled sibilants ===
Shona and other languages of Southern and Eastern Africa include whistling sounds, (this should not be confused with whistled speech).

Shona's whistled sibilants are the fricatives "sv" and "zv" and the affricates "tsv" and "dzv".

Sound	example	translation	notes
sv	masvosvobwa	"shooting stars"	"sv" can be represented by [s͎], from the Extensions to the International Phonetic Alphabet
sv	masvosve	"ants"	"sv" can be represented by [s͎], from the Extensions to the International Phonetic Alphabet
tsv	tsvaira	"sweep"	(Standard Shona)
svw	masvavembasvwi	"schemer"	(Shangwe, Korekore dialect)
zv	zvizvuvhutswa'	"gold nuggets"	(Tsunga, Zezuru dialect)
dzv	akadzva	"he/she was unsuccessful"	
zvw	huzvweverere	"emotions"	(Gova, Korekore dialect)
nzv	nzvenga	"to dodge"	(Standard Shona)
zvc	muzvcazi	"the Milky Way"	Dental clicks. Only found in Ngova, Karanga dialect.
svc	chisvcamba	"tortoise"	Dental clicks. Only found in Ngova, Karanga dialect.

Whistled sibilants stirred interest among the Western public and media in 2006, due to questions about how to pronounce the name of Morgan Tsvangirai, the leader of the Movement for Democratic Change – Tsvangirai in Zimbabwe. The BBC Pronunciation Unit recommended the pronunciation "chang-girr-ayi" /ˈtʃæŋɡɪreɪi/.

=== Special characters ===
- ' - the apostrophe can be used after the character "n" to create a sound similar to the "-ng" from the English word "ping". An example word is n'anga, which is the word for a traditional healer.

== Alphabet ==
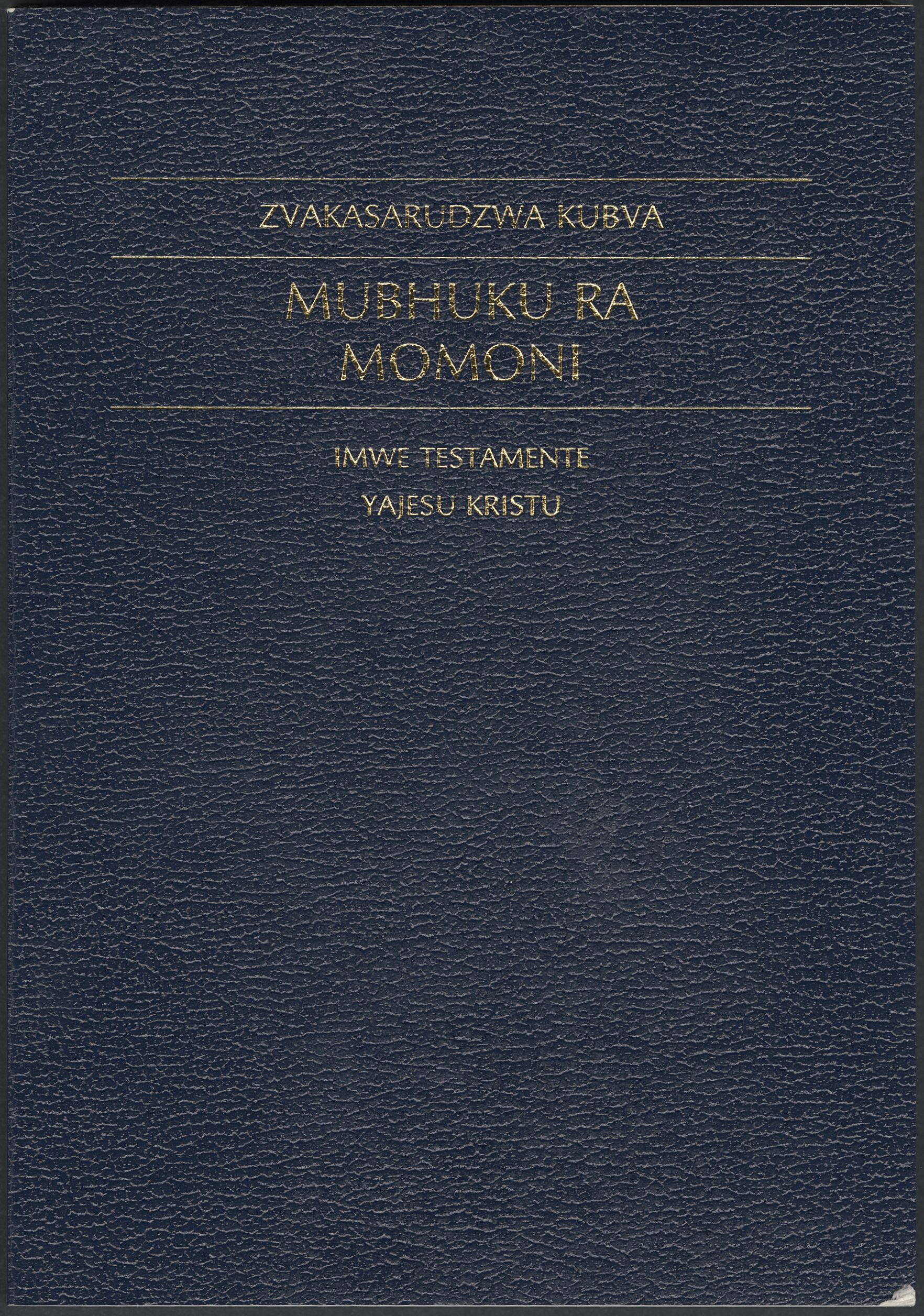
Shona version of the Book of Mormon

Shona alphabet
Letter	Name	IPA
A	a	[a]
B	ba	[ɓ]
Bh	bha	[b̤]
Ch (Č)	cha	[t͡ʃ]
D	da	[ɗ]
Dh (Ď)	dha	[d̤]
E	e	[e]
F	fa	[f]
G	ga	[ɡ̤]
H	ha	[ɦ]
I	i	[i]
J	ja	[d͡ʒ̤]
K	ka	[k]
M	ma	[m]
N	na	[n]
Nh (Ň)	nha	[n̤]
O	o	[o]
P	pa	[p]
R	ra	[r]
S	sa	[s]
Sh (Š)	sha	[ʃ]
T	ta	[t]
U	u	[u]
V	va	[ʋ]
Vh	vha	[v̤]
W	wa	[w]
Y	ya	[j]
Z	za	[z̤]
Zh (Ž)	zha	[ʒ̤]

Shona digraphs
Digraph	IPA
bv	[b͡v̤]
dz	[d͡z̤]
dzv	[d͡z̤ᵝ]
dy	[d̤ʲg]
mb	[ᵐb]
mbw	[ᵐbʷ]
mh	[m̤]
mv	[mʋ̤]
nd	[ⁿd]
ng	[ŋ]
nj	[ⁿd͡ʒ̤]
ny	[ɲ]
nz	[ⁿz̤]
nzv	[ⁿz̤ᵝ]
pf	[p͡f]
sv	[sᶲ]
sw	[skʷ]
ts	[t͡s]
tsv	[t͡sᶲ]
ty	[tʲk]
zv	[z̤ᵝ]

The letters "L", "Q", and "X" are not used in Shona and are used only in loanwords.

=== Old alphabet ===
From 1931 to 1955, Unified Shona was written with an alphabet developed by linguist Clement Martyn Doke. This included the following:

Doke alphabet letters
Letter	Description
ɓ	b with hook
ɗ	d with hook
ŋ	n with leg
ȿ	s with swash tail
ʋ	v with hook
ɀ	z with swash tail

In 1955, these were replaced by letters or digraphs from the basic Latin alphabet. For example, today ⟨sv⟩ is used for ⟨ȿ⟩ and ⟨zv⟩ is used for ⟨ɀ⟩.

== Grammar ==
Noun classes (mupanda)

Shona nouns are grouped by noun class (mupanda) based on:

1. Meanings (Zvaanoreva) e.g. words found in class 1 and 2 describe a person: munhu ("person") is in mupanda 1 and musikana ("girl") is in mupanda 2.
2. Prefix (Chivakashure) e.g. words in class 1 have prefix mu-, class 8 zvi-, class 10 dzi-, class 11 ru-, etc. Empty prefix units refer to words that do not require a prefix
3. Singular and plural forms (Uwandu neushoma) e.g. words found in class 8 are plurals of class 7: zvikoro ("schools") in class 8 is the plural form of chikoro ("school") in class 7.
4. Agreement (Sungawirirano) e.g. words in class 5 have accordance of the marker -ri- with pronouns and modifiers: garwe iri ("this crocodile"), dombo iri ("this stone"), gudo iri ("this baboon"); iri means 'this'.

Noun class		Muenzaniso weIzwi ("word example")	Word construction Prefix+body=word		English translation
Noun class		Muenzaniso weIzwi ("word example")	Prefix	Body	English translation
1	mu	mukomana	mu-	-komana	"boy"
1a	–	baba		-baba	"father"
2	va	vakomana	va-	-komana	"boys"
2a	va	vasahwira	va-	-sahwira	"best friend"
2a	vana	vanatezvara	vana-	-tezvara	"father-in-law"
2b	a	atete	a-	-tete	"aunt"
3	mu	muti	mu-	-ti	"tree"
4	mi	miti	mi-	-ti	"trees"
5	ri	rize	ri-	-ze	"scorpion"
6	ma	marize	ma-	-ze	"scorpions"
7	chi	chingwa	chi-	-ngwa	"bread"
8	zvi	zvingwa	zvi-	-ngwa	"bread"
9	i	imba	i-	-mba	"house"
10	dzi	dzimba	dzi-	-mba	"houses"
11	ru	rwizi	ru-	-izi	"river"
12	ka	kambwa	ka-	-mbwa	"that little dog"
13	tu	tumbwa	tu-	-mbwa	"those little dogs"
14	u	upfu	u-	-pfu	"mealie meal"
15	ku	kuenda	ku-	-enda	"going"
16	pa	pamba	pa-	-mba	"home"
17	ku	kumusha	ku-	-musha	"rural home"
17a	–	zasi		-zasi	"below"
18	mu	mumunda	mu-	-munda	"in the farm"
19	svi	svimbudzi	svi-	-mbudzi	"goat"
21	zi	zigomana	zi-	-gomana	"big boy"

== Sample text in Shona ==
Vanhu vese vanoberekwa vakasununguka uyewo vakaenzana pahunhu nekodzero dzavo. Vanhu vese vanechipo chokufunga nekuziva chakaipa nechakanaka saka vanofanira kubatana nomweya wohusahwira.

Translation

All human beings are born free and equal in dignity and rights. They are endowed with reason and conscience and should act towards one another in a spirit of brotherhood.

(Article 1 of the Universal Declaration of Human Rights)

== See also ==
- Shona calendar

== Bibliography ==
- Biehler, E. (1950) A Shona dictionary with an outline Shona grammar (revised edition). The Jesuit Fathers.
- Brauner, Sigmund (1995) A grammatical sketch of Shona : including historical notes. Köln: Rüdiger Koppe.
- Carter, Hazel (1986) Kuverenga Chishóna: an introductory Shona reader with grammatical sketch (2nd edition). London: SOAS.
- Doke, Clement M. (1931) Report on the unification of the Shona dialects. Stephen Austin Sons.
- Fortune, George (1985), Shona Grammatical Constructions (PDF), vol. 1, Mercury Press, archived from the original (PDF) on 20 June 2024
- Mutasa, David (1996) The problems of standardizing spoken dialects: the Shona experience, Language Matters, 27, 79
- Lafon, Michel (1995), Le shona et les shonas du Zimbabwe, Harmattan éd., Paris (in French)
- D. Dale:
  - Basic English – Shona dictionary, Afro Asiatic Languages Edition, Sept 5, 2000, ISBN 978-0869220146
  - Duramazwi: A Shona - English Dictionary, Afro Asiatic Languages Edition, Sept 5, 2000, ISBN 978-0869220146
