= Concession, Zimbabwe =

Town in Mashonaland Central, Zimbabwe

Coordinates: 17°23′S 30°57′E

Concession is a small town in Mashonaland Central province in Zimbabwe. It is located approximately 45 km from Harare and is along the road from Mazowe to Mvurwi.

Schools in the area include Dandamera Primary School, Amandas Junior School, Howick ridge Primary School, Cranham Secondary School and Kundayi Secondary School.

For health purposes, the Concession hospital is in a good state to cater for the residents' immediate needs.

Shopping areas set up at Dandamera and Amandas locations enable the residents to have access to everyday commodities.

Surrounding Concession are small and large farms that date back to the colonial period where the residents used to work and stay. Some of these farms still thrive in present day. There is a Kingdom Hall in Concession among other religious organisations.

Local agricultural crops include sugarcane. Horticultural crops grown in Concession include roses.
