= Manyika dialect =

Shona language of Zimbabwe and Mozambique

Manyika
- Chimanyika
- Native to: Zimbabwe, Mozambique
- Native speakers: 920,000 (2012–2017)
- Language family: Niger–Congo?: Atlantic–Congo; Benue–Congo; Southern; Bantu; Shona (S.10); Manyika
- Dialects: ChiBocha (Southern Manyika); ChiHera; Northen Manyika; ChiUngwe; ChiJindwi; Tewe
- Writing system: Latin

Language codes
- ISO 639-3: Either: mxc – Manyika twx – Tewe
- Glottolog: many1258 Manyika tewe1238 Tewe
- Guthrie code: S.13
- Linguasphere: (north chiManyika incl. varieties -ada to -adk)+ 99-AUT-ae (central chi-Manyika incl. -aea to -aeg) 99-AUT-ad (north chiManyika incl. varieties -ada to -adk)+ 99-AUT-ae (central chi-Manyika incl. -aea to -aeg)

Manyika is a language largely spoken by the Manyika tribe in the eastern part of Zimbabwe and across the border in Mozambique. It includes dialects ChiBocha, ChiUngwe, and ChiManyika, from which the broad Manyika language gets its name.

ChiManyika is spoken by people in the northern parts of Manicaland Province of Zimbabwe, (Nyanga, Honde Valley Mutasa area) whilst ChiBocha is spoken by people in the central part of Manicaland. Manyika differs from Karanga and Zezuru dialects in a variety of ways.

== Characteristics ==
Certain variations in vocabulary and word prefixes exist. For example, the prefix 'va-' (used in Shona before male names to signify seniority and respect) is replaced by 'sa-' in the Manyika language. Also the prefix 'va-' used as in people, for example standard Shona vanhu vakaenda vakawanda, is replaced by 'wa-' to become wanhu wakaenda wakawanda. As a result, the Manyika do not use the prefix 'va' in any form as they pronounce it as either 'sa' or 'wa'. This is how they are generally recognised as being Manyika.

The verbs in this language are tonally divided into two groups. The tonal patterns of the verbs belonging to one group are as shown below in the case of the infinitive, which has ku- as its prefix:

- kupá 'to give', kubátá 'to catch', kupómérá 'to scold', kukúrúdzíra 'to encourage';
- ku'umúpá 'to give him (something)', kumúbátá 'to catch him', kumúpómérá, kumúkúrúdzíra;
- kuzvípa 'to give (something to) oneself', kuzvíbatá 'to catch oneself', kuzvípomerá, kuzvíkurudzirá.

These tonal patterns can be represented by kuCV’CV’CV’X, kuÓCV’CV’CV’X, kuŔXCá, where X stands for a string of phonemes of any length, O for an object prefix, and R for a reflexive prefix, with an adjustment rule to the first two formulae that if X=Ø, the last CV’ can be Ø, and if both are Ø, the second CV’ can also be Ø, and with one to the last formula that if X=Ø, Cá becomes Ca.

The tonal patterns of the verbs belonging to the other group are as shown below:

- kubwa 'to leave', kumutsa 'to wake up', kutarisa 'to look at', kuswatanudza 'to make (somebody) stand up';
- kumúmútsa, kumútárisa, kumúswátanudza;
- kuzvímutsá, kuzvítarisá, kuzvíswatanudzá.

The tonal representation would be: kuX, kuÓCV’X, kuŔXCá.

This language has many indicative tenses (such as Remote Past, Recent Past, Past Progressive, Present, etc.) including negative ones.
