= Guta raJehovah =

Church in Zvimba, Zimbabwe

Guta raJehovah or Guta ra Jehovah (English: City of Jehovah), also known as the City of God, is a church and series of religious healing communities located across Zimbabwe. The beliefs of this church stem from the Methodist teachings that were present across Southern Africa at this time as well as more traditional healing practices indigenous to the area. The church was founded in 1954 by renowned faith healer Mai Chaza following her departure from the area's Methodist church with the community's first independent healing centre, what those in the church refer to as a Guta, being established in a village outside of Zimbabwe's capital, Harare (formerly known as Salisbury). This community, and Guta ra Jehovah more widely, was founded on curing the sick through spirituality and prayer particularly through Mai Chaza's perceived ability of being able to successfully pray for barren women to conceive. Not only was Mai Chaza known widely for her powers as a healer, she was referred to by her followers as "Matenga", meaning "heavens". With this view, Mai Chaza was viewed in a messianic way as the human embodiment of the Holy Spirit on Earth forming the basis of Guta raJehovah's beliefs and attracting followers to these healing communities. Those seeking treatment would travel to spend time living in the church's compounds undergoing spiritual healing from Mai Chaza and through other prayer rituals for days, months and even years at a time, practices that continue to this day.

Throughout the 1950s, Guta raJehovah experienced relative success with large amounts of people travelling from all over Zimbabwe and other Southern African countries to receive the faith healing offered by Mai Chaza, her followers and their rituals. The number of followers at the height of the church's popularity was estimated to be around 70,000. However, despite continuing to this day, the church has struggled to maintain its popularity and prominence following the death of their spiritual leader in 1960 with only around 3,000 followers still existing today.

== History ==
=== Mai Chaza and Formation ===
The history of Guta raJehovah is closely linked with the history of its founder and spiritual leader, Mai Chaza. Varied stories about her past exist but it is widely accepted that she lived as a wife and mother preaching within the Wesleyan Methodist community in Harare until a disagreement with her husband, based on her own mental or unknown physical illness, saw her cast from her home and returned to her childhood family. From this illness, Mai Chaza "died" in 1948 and claimed to have been "resurrected" after meeting God and being divinely ordered to return to Earth to heal both physical and spiritual ills. Thus, her image of a powerful spiritual healer was established.

This claim to divine powers was not accepted by the Methodist Church Mai Chaza had been a part of and so she developed an independent preaching circuit attracting people based on her healing abilities and own connection to the Holy Spirit. As more people began to flock towards the charismatic leader, the first Guta was built and the overall church of Guta raJehovah was established.

=== After Mai Chaza ===
Following a number of years of relative success and popularity healing through the church's spiritual compounds, Mai Chaza died on 25 December 1960 leaving no successor and with the mysterious phrase "I will not have a grave here on earth" indicating that her spirit would continue despite her bodily death. This left somewhat of a vacuum in the church with no clear physical leadership existing beyond the spirit of Mai Chaza which members continue to follow and believe in.

Attempts to fill this void in more recent years have seen the church splinter into a number of different sects led by new leaders claiming to be the latest embodiment of God and the manifestation of the Holy Spirit that Mai Chaza possessed. Most notably, Guta raMwari was established in 1961 in Bulawayo, Zimbabwe by the second "host" of God. This splinter sect continues the practices of Guta raJehovah to this day and remains relatively popular compared to the original church despite continuing to experience further division into smaller individual sects.

== Location ==
Guta raJehovah has experienced numerous locations throughout the church's history. Following Mai Chaza's departure from the Methodist church in 1954, she took up residency healing individuals in Kandava village approximately 20 miles South-East of Harare. On a small acre-sized plot, the headman of this particular village granted the healer and her followers permission to construct a few hundred mud-and-pole huts, forming the foundation for the first Guta ra Jehovah community. At this site, approximately 2,500 people lived in 615 huts focused around a central brick house that was occupied by Mai Chaza.

A suspected disagreement between Mai Chaza and the local village leader and an unknown fire that swept through the compound in Kandava saw the community leave for a new location. A new larger site for Guta raJehovah was established just outside the city of Mutare (formerly known as Umtali) in July 1956. This location experienced a far more successful existence as a Guta and continues to act as the headquarters of the Guta raJehovah community today attracting those in search of healing.

Another key location for the church is located in Zvimba, approximately 160 kilometres from Harare, where another Guta was established by Mai Chaza just prior to her death in 1959. It was here that Mai Chaza died from a mysterious illness and as such has become "what Jerusalem is to Christians" as somewhat of a holy site for current members of the church.

The locations at both Zvimba and Mutare continue to heal and act in the footsteps of Mai Chaza as two somewhat individual communities of Guta raJehovah which outside followers continue to make regular pilgrimages to.

== Beliefs and Practices ==
The exact rituals and practices of Guta raJehovah have remained relatively unknown given the community's desire to keep their compounds somewhat private from non-congregants. However, a number of key beliefs of the religion have been revealed.

=== Beliefs ===
The members of Guta raJehovah hold a unique understanding of God particularly in regards to their founder Mai Chaza. An interview with a member of Guta raJehovah in 2016 expressed the community's opinion of their leader saying "although [she] had a human body, she was actually God". This belief is reflective of the community's wider view that Mai Chaza was an embodiment of the holy spirit and a messenger of God. This is further demonstrated through the various divine titles she was given including "Matenga" and "Mwari" meaning "God". In a similar way, this understanding of Mai Chaza as holding the spirit of God has shaped their belief in terms of her death. Rather than her being completely gone, members of Guta raJehovah continue to believe that she continues her work in Heaven.

A large portion of the 'healing' process that is undergone within Guta raJehovah involves confession. To be granted permission to enter a Guta, new arrivals must confess all past sins they have committed. This process was introduced by Mai Chaza at the establishment of the church and can be seen as a connection to the belief held by members that a sinful life is directly related to an individual's physical and mental ailments. Further, members of Guta raJehovah also hold that confession and coming to terms with one's sins is the path to healing with a failure to heal simply being failure on the part of the individual to admit to all their past sins.

=== Practices ===
A rare insight into the daily practices of Guta raJehovah was provided by the Sunday Mail Zimbabwe in 2016 when a reporter was allowed to document the community. Each member is required to attend three church services each day, beginning with a procession in the morning where sinners are required to confess and followed with further prayer and exorcism of personal demons throughout the day.

=== Uniforms ===
Members of Guta raJehovah are also required to wear uniforms. For the men, uniforms consist of a khaki shorts and a short-sleeved top along with a cross belt while the women are required to wear long white dresses. It has been argued that these uniforms continue the idea and symbolism of healing present in the Guta raJehovah communities, with the required clothes, particularly of the women, somewhat reminiscent of the uniforms of nurses.
