= Telecel Zimbabwe =

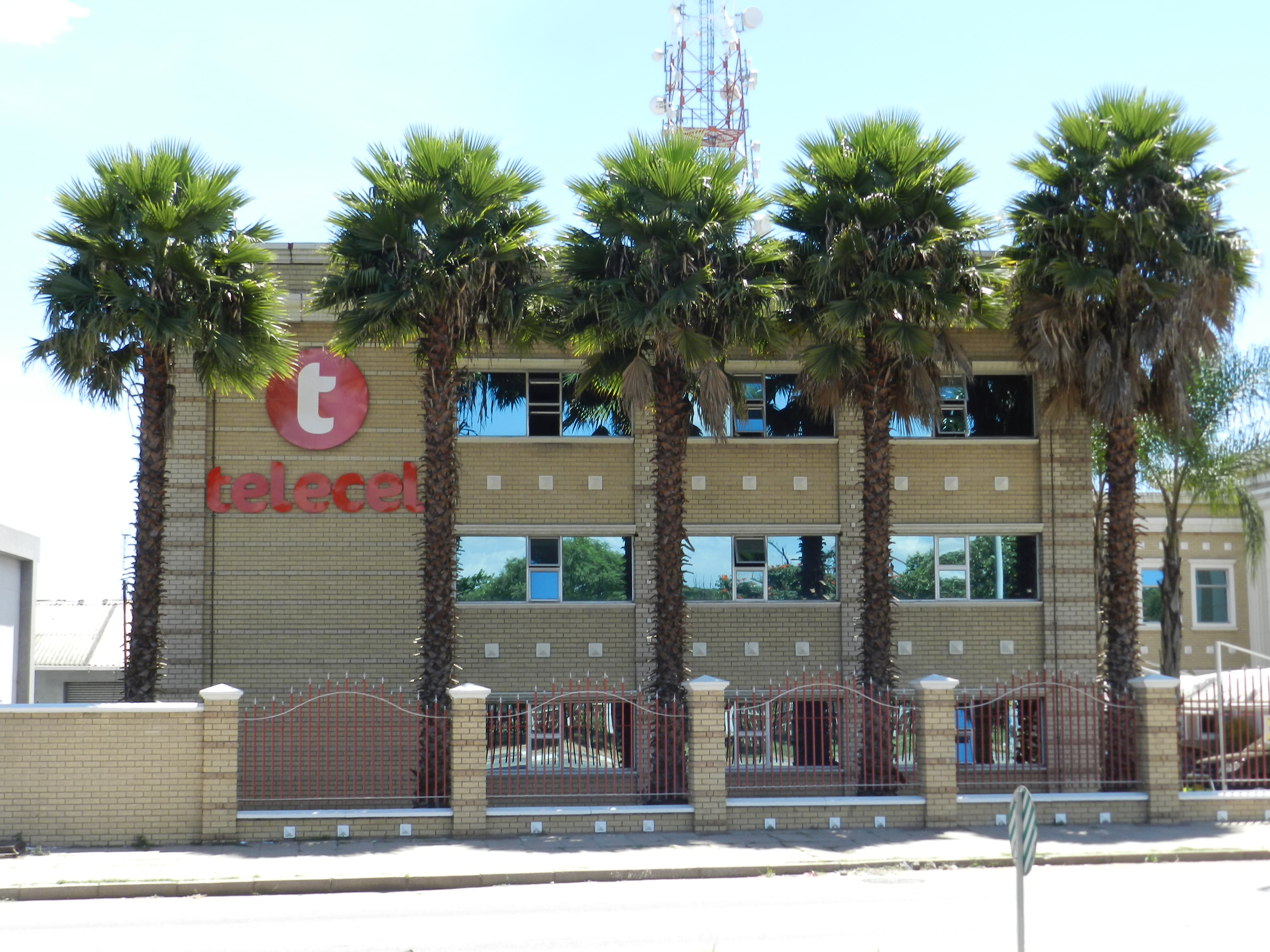
- Telecel Head Office
- Industry: Telecommunications
- Headquarters: Harare, Zimbabwe
- Key people: James Makamba (Chairman & co-Founder), Ms. Angeline Vere (CEO), Mr. Edward Mutsvairo (Finance Director)
- Website: telecel.co.zw

Telecel Zimbabwe is one of Zimbabwe's mobile telecommunications network service providers. Headquartered in Harare, Telecel Zimbabwe is the third largest mobile telecommunications network service provider in Zimbabwe with the government of Zimbabwe being the major shareholder. Telecel is the first mobile phone network in Zimbabwe to attain ISO 9001: 2000 certification.

== History ==
Telecel Zimbabwe began operating in 1998. It was formed as a partnership between Telecel International, which is a subsidiary of Cairo-based Orascom Telecom Company, a telecommunications company with operations in Europe, Africa, Asia, the Middle East and North America which in turn is owned by telecommunications giant VEON, and the Empowerment Corporation, which is a consortium of Zimbabwean business organisations.

== Shareholding ==
Telecel shareholding consists of James Makamba, through Kestrel Corporation, the Indigenous Business Women Organisation, but the shareholding is personalised through Jane Mutasa's Selporn Investments, Zimbabwe Miners’ Federation, Affirmative Action Group, War Veterans’ Association and Zimbabwe Farmers’ Union. Government of Zimbabwe owns 60% shareholding through ZARnet which it bought from Telecel International.

At one point the regulatory authority, the Posts and Telecommunications Regulatory Authority of Zimbabwe (Potraz), cancelled the company's licence because of the failure to reduce the foreign shareholding. However, the company appealed against this. In 2013 its licence was renewed for a further 20 years but on the understanding that steps would be taken to alter the shareholding. The country's Indigenisation and Economic Empowerment Act also requires foreign ownership of Zimbabwean companies to be limited to a maximum of 49%, with the remaining 51% being in the hands of indigenous Zimbabweans.

The chairman of Telecel Zimbabwe is Dr. James Makamba, who represents the Empowerment Corporation on the board of directors.

== Network coverage ==
Telecel's network coverage covers more than 85% of the country, including all its towns, cities and tourist resorts, as well as many smaller centres and rural areas.

== Products and services ==
Telecel offers voice services as well as 3G data services. Some of the products and services as well as value added services currently on offer include:

- Emergency Credit
- Teletunes
- Telecel Business
- Telecel Red
- Telecash
- Roaming
- Data Bundles
- Voice Bundles
- Airtime transfer
- Conference calls
- Missed call alert
- Call me back
- Mega Bonus Reloaded
- 911 Road Assist

Telecel launched to its subscribers an electronic wallet service called Telecash, a mobile financial service.

== Criticisms and controversies ==
Telecel has come in for criticisms on a number of fronts, mostly due to issues related to its licensing, shareholding structure and use of foreign consultants and suppliers, as well as its slowness in complying with local empowerment legislation. It has also been criticised by one of its competitors for competing in a manner it considers unfair by lowering its prices through various promotions to a level that other networks find difficult to compete with.

=== Licence ===
Telecel's licence was renewed in July, 2013 for a 20-year period. Controversy came from the fact that Telecel's shareholding had not yet met the 49% - 51% split in favour of local shareholders as required by Zimbabwe's Indigenisation and Economic Empowerment Act. Telecel has said it plans to rationalise the shareholding from the current 60% - 40% split in favour of foreign ownership to the minimum requirement of 51% or more in favour of local shareholding.

=== Employment of foreigners ===
Telecel has in the past come under criticism in the local Press and from the Affirmative Action Group, an indigenisation lobby group, for making use of the services of expatriates in jobs which, it is argued, could be done by Zimbabweans.

There was criticism in particular over the appointment of foreigners to the chief executive post. This criticism died down after, in July 2012, Telecel appointed as chief executive Francis Mawindi, a Zimbabwean chief executive officer who had been previously France Telecom Orange head of business operations for global services in the Americas based in New York, in the United States.

There has been criticism too of the secondment of foreigners from Orascom to fill other key positions at Telecel Zimbabwe. Telecel says these are consultants on time-limited contracts whose role in part is to pass on their skills and experience to Zimbabwean personnel.

=== Dispute between Telecel Zimbabwe and Econet Wireless ===
In mid-2013 there was a delay in the time between when Telecel's original licence expired and when its new licence was issued. It continued operating during this period. Econet then issued a public statement in which it stated that because Telecel did not hold a current licence it was under no obligation to interconnect it with its network. It went on to point out that it had spent a considerable sum on its licence and suggested that the fact that Telecel had not yet paid its licence fee enabled Telecel to engage in unfair competitive practices. Telecel subsequently obtained its licence and Econet had to interconnect with its network once more.

Telecel has argued that the real reason for being disconnected was because Econet was feeling the pressure from Telecel's aggressive promotions which were eating into their market share and to disrupt Telecel's massive subscriber base growth rate.

== Corporate social responsibility ==
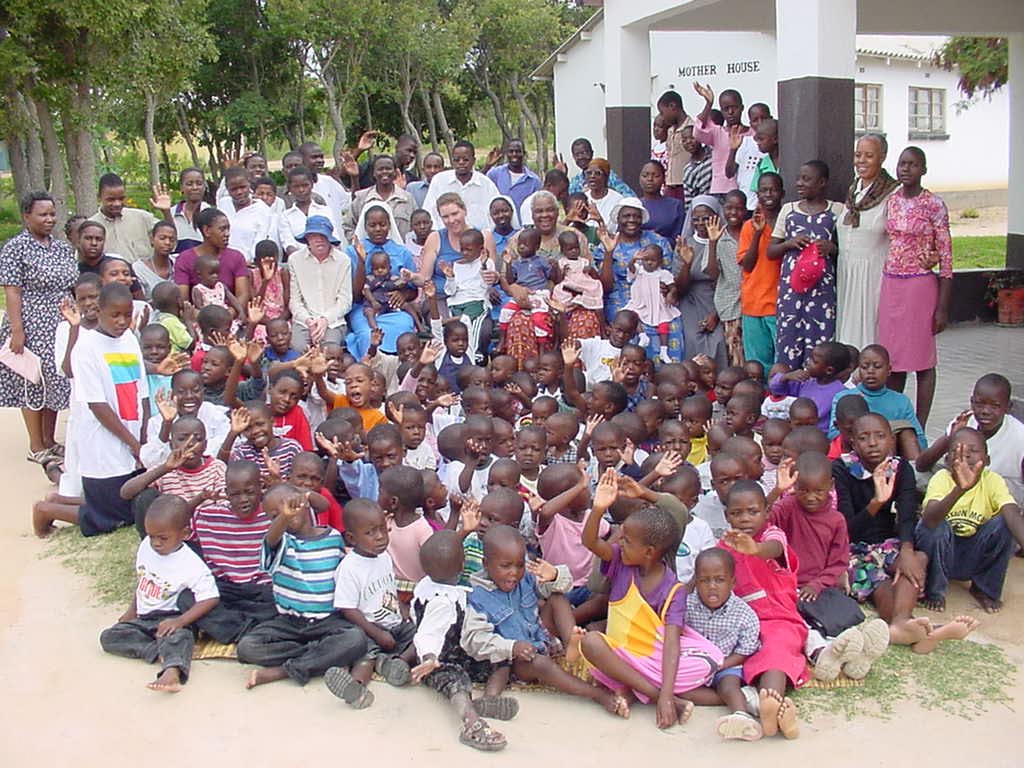
Mother Of Peace AIDs orphans

Telecel Zimbabwe has a corporate social responsibility programme that is focused on education for children, especially those who come from disadvantaged backgrounds or have physical disabilities.

Among the children's institutions that receive assistance from Telecel are Jairos Jiri Centre, Ruvimbo School, Sibantubanye Special School, Shungu DzeVana Trust and Mother of Peace orphanage in Mutoko. Telecel has also been involved in providing school furniture and sports equipment for disadvantaged schools throughout Zimbabwe.

In addition to assistance for children with disabilities, Telecel also provides ad hoc event-based sponsorships. The most recent ad hoc sponsorship was the lighting of the Victoria Falls bridge in time for the UNWTO General Assembly in August 2013. The general assembly was co-hosted by Zambia and Zimbabwe. In addition to children in need, Telecel sponsors many arts and cultural activities. One notable sponsorship is the Telecel Harare International Festival of Arts (HIFA) Main stage. Telecel also sponsors drag racing, jazz festivals, and the Kariba International Tiger fishing tournament (KITFT).
