= Matepatepa =

Village in Zimbabwe

Coordinates: 16°57′S 31°20′E

Matepatepa is a farming village in Bindura District province in Zimbabwe.

== Notable events ==
- In 2021, a fire destroyed more than 30 homes in the village.
- In 2023, a hailstorm hit the village, leaving an estimated 100 families homeless and hospitalising others.
