= Madziwa Mine =

Coordinates: 17°04′S 31°40′E

Madziwa Mine is a village that grew up next to a gold mine of the same name in the province of Mashonaland Central, Zimbabwe. It is located 32 km north of Shamva and about 100 km north-west of Harare. According to the 1982 Population Census, the village had a population of 4,617. The main mineral mined at Madziwa is nickel.
