= Bindura District =

- District
- Bindura District within Zimbabwe
- Interactive map of Bindura District
- Coordinates: 17°8′0″S 31°21′0″E
- Country: Zimbabwe
- Province: Mashonaland Central
- District: Bindura

Area
  - Total: 2,242 km^{2} (866 sq mi)
- Elevation: 1,249 m (4,098 ft)

Population (2022 census)
  - Total: 169,841
  - Density: 75.75/km^{2} (196.2/sq mi)
- Time zone: UTC+1 (CET)
  - Summer (DST): UTC+1 (CEST)

Bindura is one of seven districts in the Mashonaland Central province of Zimbabwe. The district capital is the town of Bindura.

== Settlements ==
- Matepatepa
