= 4R =

4R may refer to:

- 4R Family restaurants in Northern California
- Galaxy 4R, a Panamsat-owned communications satellite
- Ponceau 4R, a synthetic colourant
- Hamburg International airline's IATA code
- Nachtjagdgeschwader 2, from its historic Geschwaderkennung code with the Luftwaffe in World War II
- Sri Lanka aircraft registration
- A standard consumer print size for photographs. See Standard photographic print sizes
- the Railroad Revitalization and Regulatory Reform Act, also known as the "4R Act"
- the short-lived acronym for Neljä ruusua ('Four Roses'), a Finnish band, aiming for a broader international appeal
- 4R, the production code for the 1977 Doctor Who serial The Robots of Death

== See also ==
- The four Rs (disambiguation)
  - specifically Reduce, Reuse, Recycle, Replace, as in waste hierarchy - for instance in Hong Kong
- R4 (disambiguation)
