= Vernon van Oudtshoorn =

Zimbabwean cricketer (born 1976)

Personal information
- Full name: Vernon John van Oudtshoorn
- Born: 29 May 1976 (age 50); Bindura, Rhodesia
- Batting: Right-handed
- Bowling: Right-arm fast-medium

Domestic team information
- Years: Team
- 1995/96: Mashonaland Country Districts

Career statistics
Competition	FC	LA
Matches	2	1
Runs scored	30	3
Batting average	15.00	3.00
100s/50s	0/0	0/0
Top score	20	3
Balls bowled	222	36
Wickets	0	0
Bowling average	–	–
5 wickets in innings	–	–
10 wickets in match	–	–
Best bowling	–	–
Catches/stumpings	2/–	0/–
- Source: ESPNcricinfo, 19 July 2021

Vernon John van Oudtshoorn (born 29 May 1976) is a former Zimbabwean cricketer. A right-handed batsman and right-arm fast-medium bowler, he played one first-class match for Mashonaland Country Districts during the 1995–96 Logan Cup. He also played two matches, one first-class match for Mashonaland XI and one List A match for Mashonaland Country Districts, against Tasmania in 1995.
