= Zororo Makamba =

Zimbabwean journalist (1990–2020)

Zororo Rufaro Makamba
- Born: 17 January 1990; Harare, Zimbabwe
- Died: 23 March 2020 (aged 30); Harare, Zimbabwe
- Education: St John’s Prep, St John’s College; Michigan State University; New York Film Academy
- Occupations: Media Personality, Writer; Producer, Media Business Owner, Political Commentator, Television Host
- Notable work: State of the Nation, Tonight with Zororo, Point of View with Zororo
- Parents: James Makamba (father); Irene Makamba (mother)
- Website: zororomakamba.com

Zororo Makamba (17 January 1990 – 23 March 2020) was a Zimbabwean journalist and the son of Irene and James Makamba.

== Biography ==
Makamba posted commentary on Zimbabwean politics and society online under the heading "State of the Nation", and hosted current affairs programs on ZiFM Stereo and M-Net television affiliate Zambezi Magic.

He had myasthenia gravis, a neuroskeletomuscular autoimmune disease, and underwent surgery to remove a thymoma gland tumour in November 2019. He was diagnosed on 21 March 2020 with COVID-19, twelve days after returning from New York City and five days after going to a doctor with a cough and fever. He died in Harare two days later, the first death in the country due to the disease.

== See also ==
- COVID-19 pandemic in Zimbabwe
