= Mai Chisamba =

Zimbabwean businesswoman

- Born: Rebecca Tsikirayi; 21 October 1952 (age 73); Bindura, Zimbabwe
- Occupations: Businesswoman, host
- Spouse: Anorld Chisamba

Mai Chisamba (born Rebecca Tsirikirayi; 21 October 1952), is a Zimbabwean businesswoman and talk show host.

== Early life ==
Chisamba was born in Bindura, Zimbabwe, in a family of seven. She attended Bindura Salvation Army Primary School before attending Usher Girls High in Matabeleland. Chisamba received teacher training at Howard Institute.

== Career ==
Dr. Rebecca Chisamba is a Zimbabwean media personality, broadcaster, and philanthropist. She has received numerous awards, including the Honour of the Order of the Star of Zimbabwe (Silver) in 2023, conferred by President Emmerson Mnangagwa. She has also been recognized as Communicator of the Year.

Chisamba’s career spans several decades and includes work in education, television, radio, print media, and entrepreneurship. She is best known for executive producing and hosting the Mai Chisamba Show, which addresses social and economic issues, promotes gender equality, and highlights local languages and Zimbabwean cultural values.

In 2025, she was inducted into the National Excellence Hall of Fame in recognition of her contributions to media and broadcasting.

== Personal life ==
Rebecca is married and has 5 children and several grandchildren. One of her daughters, Gamuchirai Chisamba works on the Mai Chisamba show as a Graphic Designer.

== Awards and honors ==
Chisamba has received several awards for her contributions to media and social advocacy.

- Honour of the Order of the Star of Zimbabwe (Silver), 2023, awarded by President Emmerson Mnangagwa.
- Communicator of the Year Award, 2003.
- Overall Defender of Human Rights Award, 2014 – Zimbabwe Human Rights Association.
- Recognized as a gender champion by UN Women in collaboration with the Msasa Project.
- Popular Television Show and Outstanding Contributor awards, Zimbabwe Annual Film and Television Awards (ZAFTAs), 2023.
- Chairman’s Special Recognition Award, Zimbabwe Achievers Awards, 2025.
- Inducted into the National Excellence Hall of Fame, 2025.
