= Shamva District =

- District
- Interactive map of Shamva District
- Coordinates: 17°10′0″S 31°40′0″E
- Country: Zimbabwe
- Province: Mashonaland Central
- District: Shamva

Area
  - Total: 2,695 km^{2} (1,041 sq mi)
- Elevation: 953 m (3,127 ft)

Population (2022 census)
  - Total: 165,641
  - Density: 61.46/km^{2} (159.2/sq mi)
- Time zone: UTC+1 (CET)
  - Summer (DST): UTC+1 (CEST)

Shamva is one of seven districts in the Mashonaland Central province of Zimbabwe. The district capital is the village of Shamva.

One of the noted gold mines in Zimbabwe is the Shamva Mine, located 70 km northeast of Harare, which had produced 52 tonnes of gold by 1982. Gold deposits are found within volcaniclastics, associated with pyrite.

Schools in Shamva include Chindunduma, madziva Wadzanai secondary schools. DAPP Humana People to People head office is In Shamva.
