= Mvurwi =

Umvukwesi
- Town
- Location within Zimbabwe
- Coordinates: 17°1′S 30°51′E
- Country: Zimbabwe
- Province: Mashonaland Central
- District: Mazowe

Government
  - Type: Town Council
- Elevation: 1,492 m (4,895 ft)

Population (2022 census)
  - Total: 15,645
- Time zone: UTC+2 (CAT)
- Website: Mvurwi Town Council

Mvurwi, originally known as Umvukwesi, is a town in Mashonaland Central province in Zimbabwe.

Some of Mvurwi's schools include Holy Rosary Primary and Secondary School, Mvurwi Primary and High School and Umvukwesi Primary School which is one of the town's most elite learning facilities and produces noteworthy results.

Previously, it fell within the breadbasket region (from Banket - Shamva) where much of foodstuffs and the golden leaf were being produced. Majority of Mvurwians are small scale farmers who rely on the agro-based economy. The industry sector has to be improved in future, currently it has got Delta Beverage brewing company and Mashonaland Tobacco Sales to mention a few.

Chiote/Pembi Falls and Galiva are dams surrounding the borders of the town. It is still developing in terms of infrastructure. It has other government offices such as R.G and major referral hospitals.

Mvurwi Town was gazetted as a town council on 22 February 2010 and is an expanding urban authority located in Mashonaland Central Province. Originally, a service center in the Mazowe RDC, Mvurwi Town has developed to become an important agricultural and trade centre, with an ethnically diverse population of about 16,000 people.

It is surrounded by farms and is conducive for farming that is essential for food production of the country. Currently, the area is developing rapidly with locations such as Kurai, Kurai Extension, Mbizi, Suoguru among others. Through Devolution of resources by the government, saw it impetus to build the Tobacco Markets in the area to serve the community at large thus improving the socio-economic activities.
