= Mount Darwin, Zimbabwe =

Town in Zimbabwe

Mount Darwin
- Location in Zimbabwe
- Coordinates: 16°45′54″S 31°34′30″E
- Country: Zimbabwe
- Province: Mashonaland Central
- Districts of Zimbabwe: Mount Darwin District
- Municipality: Mount Darwin Town Council
- Elevation: 953 m (3,127 ft)

Population (2022 estimate)
  - Total: 240,727
- Climate: Cwa

Mount Darwin is a town in Mashonaland Central province in Zimbabwe.

== Location ==
The town lies in Mount Darwin District, in Mashonaland Central Province in north-eastern Zimbabwe. It is located approximately 160 kilometres (99 mi), by road, northeast of Harare, the capital and largest city in that country.

== Overview ==
In addition to the offices of Mount Darwin Town Council, the town is also the location of the Mount Darwin District Administration. The town has a public hospital, Mount Darwin District Hospital, and a mission hospital, Karanda Mission Hospital. Karanda attends to anywhere from 15 to 40 surgeries and between 200 and 300 outpatients daily. ZB Bank Limited, a commercial bank, maintains a branch in the town. Mount Darwin is also served by Mount Darwin Airport.

== History ==
Mount Darwin is the probable site of some of the earliest European missionary work in southern Africa, by the Portuguese Jesuit Gonçalo da Silveira, who arrived in 1560 and was killed in March 1561 near Mount Darwin following a souring of relations with the local chief. Mount Darwin was named by the hunter and explorer Frederick Courtney Selous after the British naturalist Charles Darwin.

== Climate ==
Climate data for Mount Darwin, Zimbabwe (1961–1990)
Month	Jan	Feb	Mar	Apr	May	Jun	Jul	Aug	Sep	Oct	Nov	Dec	Year
Mean daily maximum °C (°F)	28.3 (82.9)	27.9 (82.2)	28.0 (82.4)	27.6 (81.7)	26.1 (79.0)	24.0 (75.2)	23.8 (74.8)	26.2 (79.2)	29.3 (84.7)	31.5 (88.7)	30.7 (87.3)	28.8 (83.8)	27.7 (81.9)
Mean daily minimum °C (°F)	18.5 (65.3)	18.4 (65.1)	17.1 (62.8)	14.3 (57.7)	9.8 (49.6)	6.6 (43.9)	6.1 (43.0)	8.1 (46.6)	12.5 (54.5)	16.7 (62.1)	18.4 (65.1)	18.5 (65.3)	13.8 (56.8)
Average rainfall mm (inches)	219.0 (8.62)	185.9 (7.32)	86.7 (3.41)	28.9 (1.14)	5.2 (0.20)	0.9 (0.04)	1.2 (0.05)	0.5 (0.02)	1.4 (0.06)	10.3 (0.41)	64.2 (2.53)	183.4 (7.22)	787.6 (31.01)
Average rainy days	16	14	7	2	1	0	0	0	0	1	7	14	62
Source: World Meteorological Organization

== Population ==
In 2022, the town's population was estimated at 240,727.

== Sport ==
As of 2026, Agama F.C. play in the Zimbabwe Premier Soccer League.

== Notable people ==
The following notable people are associated with Mount Darwin:

1. Christopher Kuruneri – A politician; he was an MP representative.
2. Joice Mujuru – A politician; she was born here
3. James Makamba – A businessman; he maintains a home in Mount Darwin
4. Savior Kasukuwere – A politician; he was born here.

== See also ==
- Shona people
- Manyika people
- Bindura
- Chitungwiza
- Mutare
- Chimoio
