= Nyamapanda =

Coordinates: 16°58′S 32°52′E

Nyamapanda (Other names: Nyamapande, Nyamapanda Customs Post) is a town in the Mashonaland East Province of northern Zimbabwe. It is a border post for crossing between Zimbabwe and Mozambique. The border post on the Mozambique side is Cochemane. Nyamapanda is at an altitude of 579 metres (1,900 ft). A dam on the Nyamapande River (Inyapandi River) just upstream from the town provides for irrigation.
