= Shamva =

- Town
- Shamva located in Zimbabwe Map
- Coordinates: 17°19′S 31°33′E
- Country: Zimbabwe
- Province: Mashonaland Central
- District: Shamva

Population (2012)
  - Total: 908
- Time zone: UTC+2 (CAT)
- Climate: Cwa

Shamva is a town in the province of Mashonaland Central in the Shamva District of Zimbabwe. It is located in the Mazowe valley about 90 km north-east of Harare. The area was called Abercorn by Rhodesian colonizers. The present name is derived from a tree which is found in abundance in this area called 'Tsamvi' in Shona. The town is most famous for the gold mine of the same name at the foot of the Shamva Mountain. Nickel is now mined in area after a large nickel deposit was discovered in the area. The gold mine recently reopened after Landela Mining Ventures Ltd., a subsidiary of the Mauritius-based company Sotic International Ltd., purchased the Shamva gold mine from Metallon Corporation, with a goal of producing 400 kg of gold per month by 2023. However attacks, killings, and disappearances of gold miners have been ongoing in various parts of Zimbabwe since 2018, including in Shamva and nearby Mazowe.

In colonial history, Shamva is noted for what was likely the first labor strike by African workers in Rhodesia in 1927.

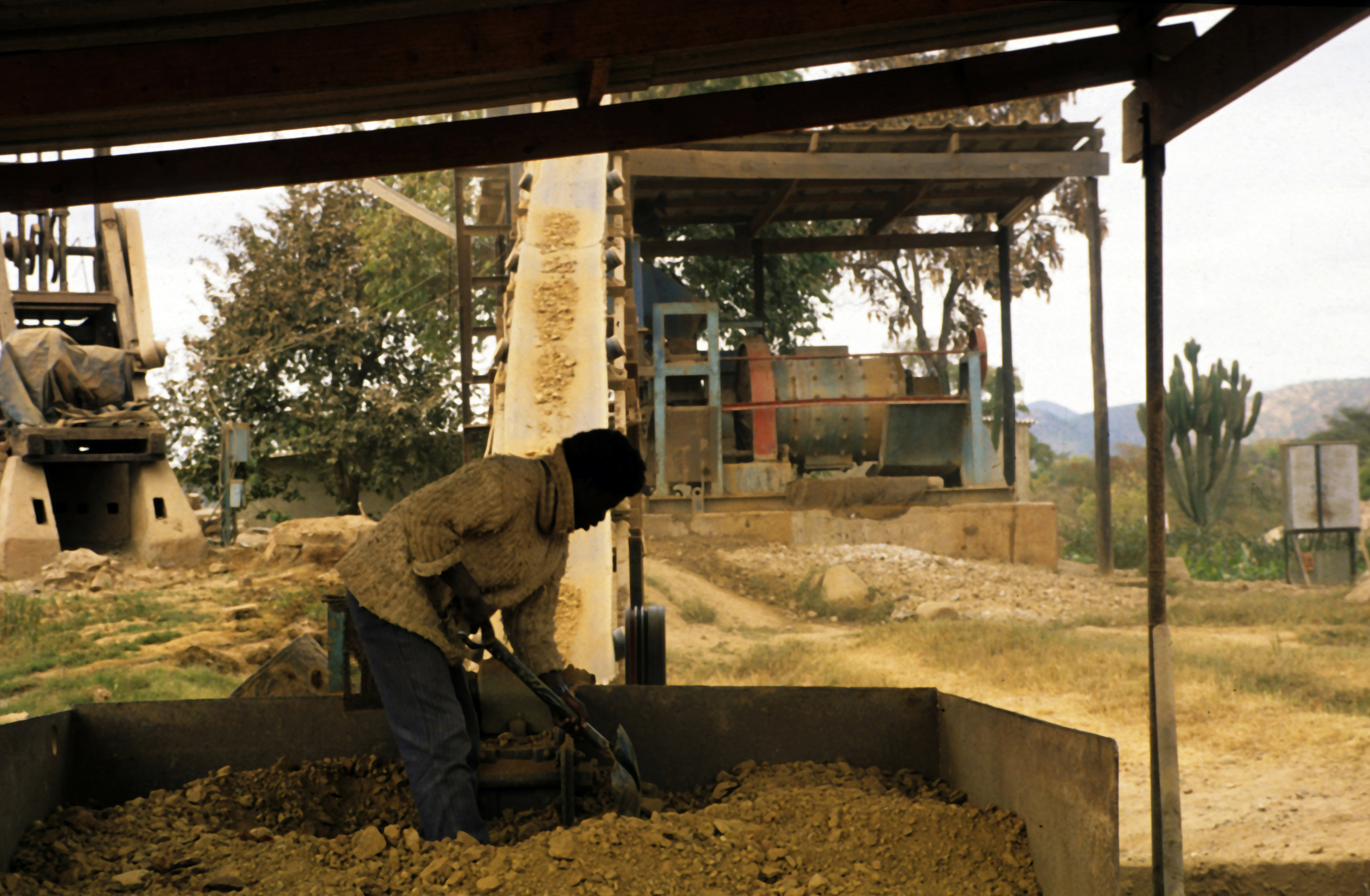
Small gold-ore mill at Shamva, 2004
