= Centenary, Zimbabwe =

Coordinates: 16°48′S 31°07′E

Centenary is a village in Muzarabani District in Zimbabwe.

== Economy ==
Centenary is relatively a young agricultural district of Zimbabwe. It was opened up from virgin bush in 1952 primarily for the production of tobacco. The aromatic qualities of this tobacco made it a prominent growing area. Tobacco contributed to the development of roads, schools, clinics and the later building of administrative buildings in Centenary Township. The town is controlled by the Muzarabani Rural District Council which is headed by the Chief executive officer of the council. The council collects levies from farmers and different business people to fund its activities and improve amenities in the area.

Centenary has an active and skilled labour force employed by the government of the republic of Zimbabwe at the District Administrator's office in the government complex. The unemployment rate is low since the majority is employed in big commercial farmlands.

Farmlands which are close to the town in a ten kilometers radius include Mwonga farm near the aerodrome, Sable heights, and other farmlands in the Msengezi area. A famous township called Gatu is the main centre for formal and informal business where farmers can sell their horticultural produce from as early as 6am CAT - 8pm CAT. Since the introduction of the multi currency system the US$ circulates more than the local currency.

The post office offers a forex bureau de exchange services. There are no other commercial banks in the area except the mobile money transfare agents registered for that business.

== Climate ==
The climate in Centenary is one of the best in Mashonaland Central Province. Throughout the year, the town and district will have at least 8 hours of good sunshine making it a good farming region. Temperatures usually ranges from 12 degrees minimum (temp) and 35 degrees maximum (temp) in summer. In winter the area will be having an average of 9 degrees minimum (temp) and 22 degrees maximum (temp). Climate change has affected the area and region and the town has now experiencing high heating temperatures affecting crops in the region. Low rainfall patterns has been witnessed for the past years.

== Transport and communication ==
Centenary can be accessed through many entry points. From Harare the capital city, people can use the entry point from Mvurwi or the Glendale Chaona entry point. The major source of transport servicing the town are long distance buses and mini buses which ply the Harare- Muzarabani area. Farmers can use pick up trucks for their businesses in the area. Telecommunication services are fast growing in the town. There is internet connectivity in the town as well as radio broadcasting network.

== Notable residents ==
1. Edward Raradza (Former Member of Parliament)
2. Christopher Chitindi (Former Member of Parliament)
3. Chief Matthew Chitemamuswe (Traditional Chief)
4. Benson Ngoshi (Late) prominent businessman
5. Angelinah Zimbiti Svikiro (Famous female politician)
