= Mazowe =

- District
- Mazowe in Zimbabwe Map
- Coordinates: 17°31′S 30°58′E
- Country: Zimbabwe
- Province: Mashonaland Central

Population (2012 Census)
  - Total: 6,561
- Time zone: UTC+2 (CAT)
- Climate: Cwb

Mazowe is a village in Mashonaland Central province in Zimbabwe.

The origin of the name Mazowe or Mazoe, according to Phillippa Berlyn, writing in 1970, the name is a corruption of the word manzou, or nyanzou, meaning the “place of the elephants”.

== Notable people ==
- John Bredenkamp
- Fortune Chasi
- Paul Tangi Mhova Mkondo
- Auxillia Mnangagwa
- Grace Mugabe
- Joseph Msika
