= Bindura =

- City
- Coat of arms

- Location within Zimbabwe
- Coordinates: 17°18′S 31°20′E
- Country: Zimbabwe
- Province: Mashonaland Central
- District: Bindura District
- Established: 1901
- Elevation: 1,070 m (3,510 ft)

Population (2022 census)
  - Total: 50,400
- Time zone: UTC+2 (CAT)
- Area code: +26366210
- Climate: Savanna
- Website: http://bindurardc.co.zw/

Bindura is a city in the province of Mashonaland Central province, Zimbabwe. It is located in the Mazowe Valley about 88 km north-east of Harare. According to the 1982 Population Census, the city had a population of 18,243. This rose to 21,167 in the 1992 census and in the 2012 census it had reached 46,275. It is the administrative capital of the province. Bindura Nickel, now called Trojan Nickel Mine, a subsidiary of Mwana Africa plc, mines nickel, copper and cobalt in the area and operates a smelter refinery just south of the town. Cotton and maize are grown intensely in the region. The first basic school in Bindura opened in 1912.

The perennial Mazowe River flows around Bindura and through its north-eastern perimeter.

Bindura was originally named Kimberley Reefs after the gold mine which was opened in 1901, and changed to Bindura in 1913 when the railway arrived. Bindura is probably an Anglicised version of the Shona phrase, pindura mhuka, meaning "turn the game".

== Notable people ==
- Freeman HKD (b. 1988), singer-songwriter
- Mai Chisamba (b. 1952), businesswoman and talk show host
- George Kahari (1930-2021), diplomat and educator
- Mark McNulty (b. 1953), professional golfer
- Vernon van Oudtshoorn (b. 1976), professional cricketer
