= Mashonaland Central Province =

Coordinates: 17°00′S 31°00′E

Mashonaland Central: Dunhu reMashonaland Central (Shona); Isabelo seMashonaland Central (Northern Ndebele)
- Province
- Mashonaland Central, Province of Zimbabwe
- Country: Zimbabwe
- Capital: Bindura

Government
  - Type: Provincial Government
  - Minister of State for Provincial Affairs: Christopher Magomo

Area
  - Total: 28,347 km^{2} (10,945 sq mi)

Population (2022 census)
  - Total: 1,384,891
  - Density: 48.855/km^{2} (126.53/sq mi)
- HDI (2018): 0.519 low · 10th

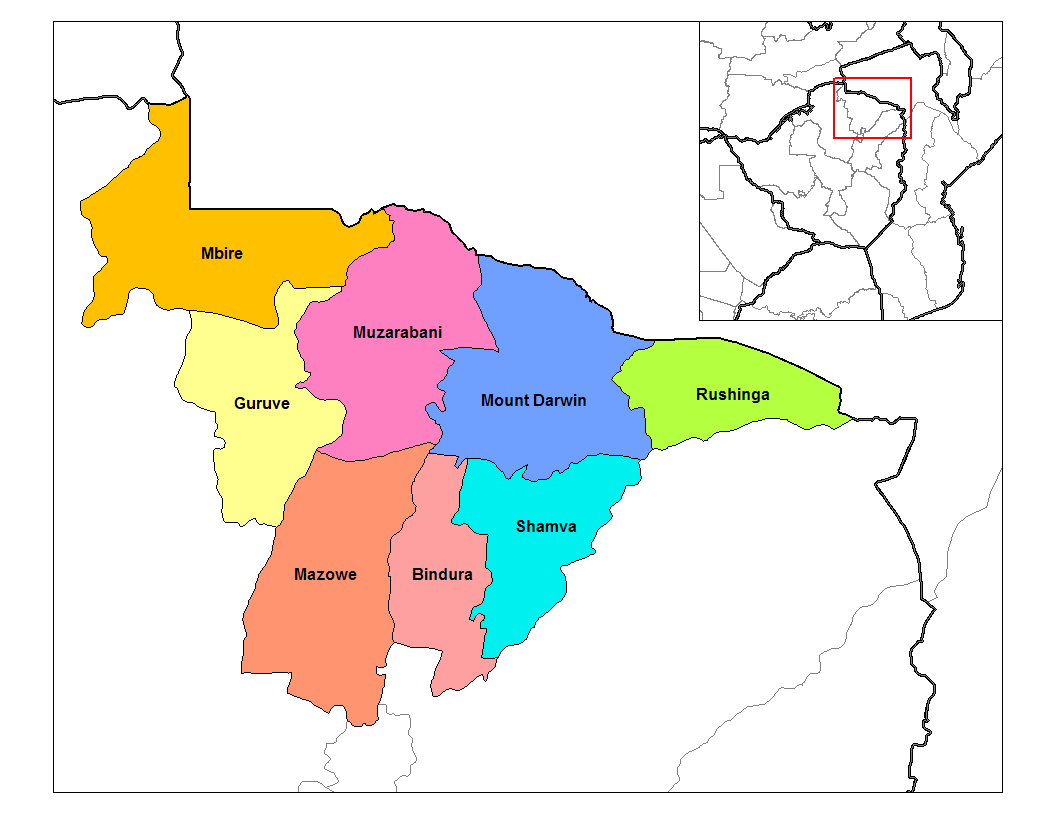
Districts of Mashonaland Central

Mashonaland Central is a province of Zimbabwe. It is divided into eight districts and has an area of 28,347 km^{2} and a population of 1,384,891 (2012 census), representing about 9.1% of the total Zimbabwe population. It is dominated by the Shona speaking locals.

== Geography ==
The province spans the northern mainland of the country, extending into the Zambezi valley and reaching the Mozambican border in the northeast. Its capital, Bindura, is approximately 90 kilometers from the national capital, Harare. The province encompasses towns including Mount Darwin, Mazowe, Glendale, Guruve, Muzarabani, Centenary, and Shamva.

== Demographics ==
Census	Population
2002	995,427
2012	1,152,520
2022	1,384,891
2032	~ 1,630,000 to 1,650,000

== Background ==
Bindura is the capital of the province. During the 2002/2003 rainy season, the area experienced heavy flooding.

== Mashonaland Central districts ==
The province is divided into eight districts:

- Bindura
- Mbire
- Guruve
- Mount Darwin
- Rushinga
- Shamva
- Mazowe
- Muzarabani

== See also ==
- Provinces of Zimbabwe
- Districts of Zimbabwe
