= ZANU–PF =

Ruling political party of Zimbabwe

Zimbabwe African National Union – Patriotic Front
- Abbreviation: ZANU–PF
- First Secretary: Emmerson Mnangagwa
- National Chairperson: Oppah Muchinguri
- Second Secretaries: Constantino Chiwenga; Kembo Mohadi
- Founder: Enos Nkala, Herbert Chitepo, Ndabaningi Sithole, Robert Mugabe, Edgar Tekere
- Founded: 18 March 1975 (51 years, 238 days)
- Split from: ZANU
- Headquarters: ZANU–PF Building; Harare, Zimbabwe
- Youth wing: ZANU–PF Youth League
- Women's wing: ZANU–PF Women's League
- Membership (2022 estimation): ▲3,900,000
- Ideology: African nationalism; Pan-Africanism; Populism
- Continental affiliation: Former Liberation Movements of Southern Africa
- International affiliation: Socialist International (2008–2017); For the Freedom of Nations! (since 2024)
- Colors: Green, yellow, red, black
- National Assembly: 194 / 280
- Senate: 33 / 90

Website
- www.zanupf.org.zw

The Zimbabwe African National Union – Patriotic Front (ZANU–PF) is a political organisation which has been the ruling party of Zimbabwe since independence in 1980. The party was led for many years by Robert Mugabe, first as prime minister with the Zimbabwe African National Union (ZANU) and then as president from 1987 after the merger with the Zimbabwe African People's Union (ZAPU) and retaining the name ZANU–PF.

At the 2008 parliamentary election, the ZANU–PF lost sole control of parliament for the first time in party history and brokered a difficult power-sharing deal with the Movement for Democratic Change – Tsvangirai (MDC). ZANU-PF then won the 2013 election, gaining a two-thirds majority. The party narrowly held their super-majority in the 2018 election.

On 19 November 2017, following a coup d'état, ZANU–PF removed Robert Mugabe as party leader, who resigned two days later, and appointed former vice president Emmerson Mnangagwa in his place.

== History ==
=== Predecessors (1955–1963) ===
The first militant African nationalist organisation in Southern Rhodesia was the City Youth League (CYL), formed in the colony's capital, Salisbury, in August 1955 by James Chikerema, Dunduzu Chisiza, George Nyandoro, and Edson Sithole. On 12 September 1957, the CYL merged with the long-established but largely dormant Southern Rhodesia chapter of the African National Congress to form the Southern Rhodesia African National Congress (SRANC). The new organisation adopted the CYL's principle of "one man, one vote" and elected Joshua Nkomo as its president. The SRANC, which demanded African majority rule, gained substantial support across the country, but was banned by the Southern Rhodesian government in February 1959. In turn, on 1 January 1960, the National Democratic Party (NDP) was formed. The NDP advocated a similarly militant platform, and was similarly banned in December 1961. In the same month, Nkomo formed the Zimbabwe African People's Union, which shared the same aims and tactics of its predecessor organisations. In September 1962, amid growing unrest in Southern Rhodesia's major towns, ZAPU was banned and many of its leaders detained. The colony's Unlawful Organisations Act was also amended in an attempt to prevent ZAPU from being reconstituted with a different name.

=== Formation (1963) ===
African nationalist politics in Rhodesia in the 1960s were characterised by internal rivalries and disputes over strategy. Divisions within ZAPU came to a head in April 1963 when Nkomo called a meeting of the party's executive in Dar es Salaam, where he had gone after ZAPU was banned in late 1962. The main criticisms of Nkomo were directed against his initial support of Southern Rhodesia's 1961 constitution (a position he later reversed), his extensive foreign travel in pursuit of international support for the movement, and his handling of the formation of a government in exile in Tanganyika. According to Nkomo, he had received permission to form a government in exile, but by the time the rest of ZAPU's leadership arrived in Dar es Salaam, he had changed his mind and was opposed the idea. Other accounts describe a split between Nkomo, who preferred an externally-based movement, and others—including Enoch Dumbutshena and Ndabaningi Sithole—who favoured an internal struggle and pressured Nkomo to return to Rhodesia. President Julius Nyerere told the assembled ZAPU leaders that neither he nor other African heads of state supported the idea of a government in exile and that "victory" could only be achieved within Rhodesia.

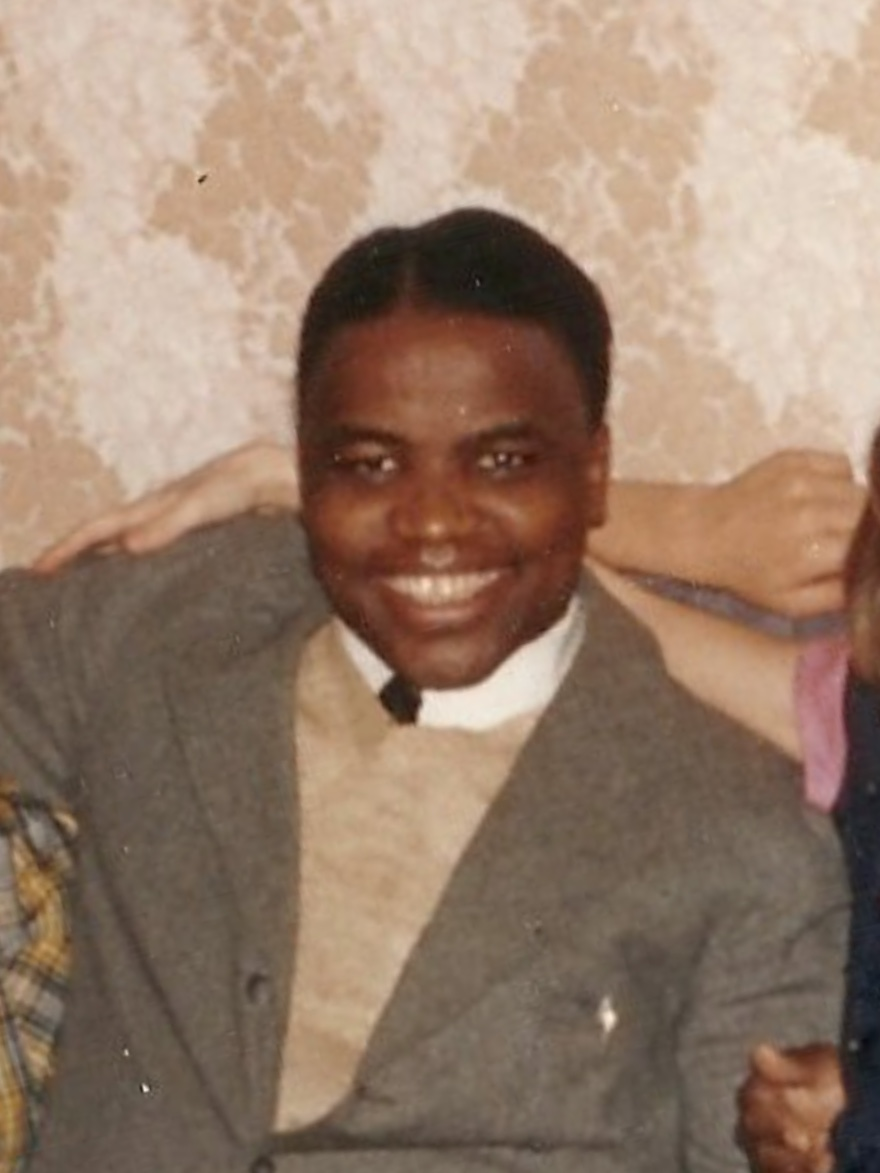
Ndabaningi Sithole, ZANU's founding president, in 1955.

Nkomo returned to Salisbury on 2 July 1963, after which a majority of the party executive that had remained in Dar es Salaam voted to remove him as president of ZAPU. In response, Nkomo suspended the various "rebels", including Sithole and Robert Mugabe, from the party. Unable to outmaneuver Nkomo within ZAPU, his opponents decided to create their own organisation. On 8 August 1963, Sithole, Herbert Chitepo, Leopold Takawira, Edgar Tekere, Henry Hamadziripi, and Mukudzei Midzi gathered at the Highfield home of Enos Nkala to form the Zimbabwe African National Union (ZANU).

In response to ZANU's formation, Nkomo called a mass meeting on 10 August 1963 at Cold Comfort Farm, a multiracial cooperative outside Salisbury, where he formed a new organisation, the People's Caretaker Council (PCP), to replace ZAPU, which was still banned. To preempt ZANU's growth, Nkomo took steps to solidify his hold on the masses, replacing ZAPU's existing centralised structure with a larger number of new, smaller branches. In the ZAPU–ZANU split, most of Nkomo's longtime allies who had been with him since the SRANC's formation in 1957—including Jason Moyo and George Nyandoro—stayed with ZAPU, while many nationalist leaders who had come to prominence in 1960 or later—like Sithole and Mugabe—joined the new party.

On 22 August 1963, Sithole held ZANU's first press conference, telling reporters, "When the party came to power it would repeal the Land Apportionment Act. It would also repeal the Land Husbandry Act and replace both by a new land redistribution law." In addition to land reform, Sithole pledged that "A bill of rights would be entrenched in the constitution guaranteeing the rights and freedom of every citizen." Sithole told the reporters that ZANU was "nonracial" and would accommodate "people who share a common destiny and democratic rule by the majority, regardless of race, colour, creed, or tribe." ZANU's platform was quickly taken up by the press, and stood in contrast to ZAPU, which had not made public a comprehensive platform. ZAPU responded by attacking ZANU leaders' character and ideological bona fides.

Almost immediately following the split, violent clashes broke out between supporters of the rival parties in urban areas across the country. At one ZANU meeting in August 1963 in Highfield, 200 supporters required the protection of Rhodesian police to hold their event, while a "milling pro-Nkomo mob of [a] thousand threatening death to the 'sellouts'" waited outside and stoned the cars of ZANU leaders Sithole and Nathan Shamuyarira as they left. Nkomo's support was even stronger in the African townships of Harare and Mufakose. The day after the meeting, Sithole "acknowledged [a] miscalculation of Nkomo's mass strength." In Bulawayo, two houses were bombed with Molotov cocktails, and on 17 August, three policemen were injured by a stone-throwing mob of Nkomo supporters. By 14 August, both Sithole and Nkomo were calling for an end the violence in the African press, to little effect. Nkomo blamed the violence on ZANU supporters, arguing that his followers were using "self-defence against a group of power-hungry people who have failed to gain public support." Sithole likewise claimed that his supporters were not the instigators, stating that he had "a group of well-disciplined officials who can control the youngsters."

Despite facing initial backlash, ZANU did gain a following, and found particularly strong support in the eastern districts around Fort Victoria and Umtali. Meanwhile, ZAPU maintained an advantage in Bulawayo and Matabeleland, and in and around the capital, Salisbury. Though neither party's leaders belonged exclusively to one ethnic group, the division arguably had an ethnic component, with ZAPU finding disproportionate support among the Ndebele people and ZANU drawing its base largely from the Shona people. Compared to ZAPU, ZANU branded itself as taking a more confrontational approach to white-minority rule, while portraying Nkomo as weak, indecisive, and insufficiently revolutionary. ZANU messaging downplayed ethnicity as a factor in the divisions within the nationalist movement, instead highlighting strategic and ideological differences. By contrast, Nkomo pointed to tribalism as the main cause of the ZAPU–ZANU split in his autobiography.

=== Bush War/Second Chimurenga (1964–1980) ===
ZANU held its inaugural party congress in the Mkoba suburb of Gwelo from 21–23 May 1964. There, Ndabaningi Sithole was elected as the party's first president, Leopold Takawira as vice-president, Robert Mugabe as secretary-general, Herbert Chitepo as national chairman, and Enos Nkala as treasurer. In his presidential address, Sithole told the congress that ZANU "stands for democracy, socialism, nationalism, one man/one vote, freedom, pan-Africanism, non-racism, and republicanism.

The Patriotic Front (PF) was formed as a political and military alliance between ZAPU and ZANU during the war against white minority rule in Rhodesia (now called Zimbabwe). The PF included the Soviet Union-backed ZAPU, which was led by Joshua Nkomo and operated mainly from Zambia, and the Chinese-backed ZANU led by Robert Mugabe, which operated mainly from neighboring Mozambique. Both movements contributed to their respective military forces. ZAPU's military wing was known as the Zimbabwe People's Revolutionary Army (ZIPRA) and ZANU's guerrillas were known as the Zimbabwe African National Liberation Army. The objective of the PF was to overthrow the predominantly white minority government, headed by the Prime Minister Ian Smith, through political pressure and military force.

=== Post-independence ===
Their common goal was achieved in 1980, following the Lancaster House Agreement of December 1979, when the United Kingdom granted independence to Zimbabwe following a brief period of direct British control. During the 1980 general election campaign, the PF parties competed separately as ZANU–Patriotic Front (ZANU–PF) and Patriotic Front–ZAPU (PF–ZAPU). The election was won by Mugabe and ZANU–PF, with Nkomo and his PF–ZAPU retaining a stronghold in the provinces of Matabeleland.

In December 1981, agents of South Africa's apartheid government bombed party headquarters, nearly killing many senior ZANU–PF leaders, including Robert Mugabe.

In December 1987, after five years of the low-level civil war known as Gukurahundi, the opposition ZAPU, led by Nkomo, was absorbed through the Unity Accord with ZANU to form an official ZANU–PF.

From 1999 to 2017, Mugabe faced a major political challenge from the opposition Movement for Democratic Change. Mugabe won 56% at the presidential elections of 9–11 March 2002.

At the December 2004 five-year conference, Joice Mujuru, a Zezuru Shona like Mugabe, and whose late-husband Solomon Mujuru was the retired head of the armed forces, was elevated to the post of vice president of the party (the first woman to hold that office) at the expense of contender Emmerson Mnangagwa and his supporters; Justice Minister Patrick Chinamasa and Information Minister Jonathan Moyo.

The 2005 Zimbabwe parliamentary elections were held on 31 March 2005. The party won 59.6% of the popular vote and 78 out of 120 elected seats. Later that year, 26 November, it won 43 of 50 elected senators. The parliamentary election was disputed as being unfair. The leader of the opposition MDC party said, "We are deeply disturbed by the fraudulent activities we have unearthed", and various human rights groups reported that hundreds of thousands of "ghost voters" had appeared on the electoral roll of 5.8 million people.

At the 2008 parliamentary election, the ZANU–PF lost its majority in parliament for the first time since independence, and held 94 seats out of the expanded 210 seats, with Sokwanele stating that this figure would have been lower had it not been for gerrymandering, electoral fraud, and widespread intimidation.

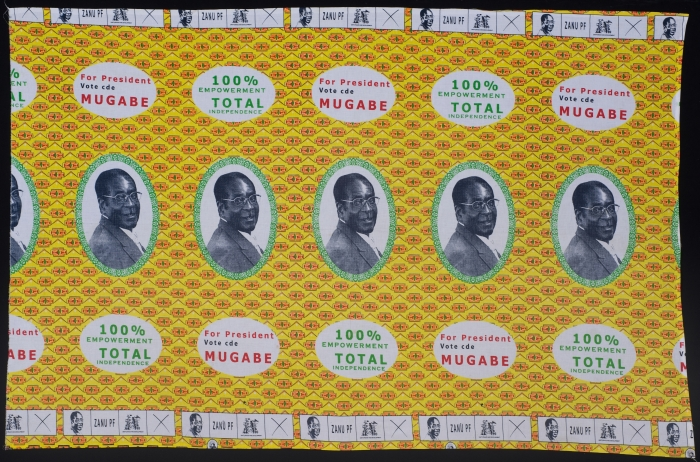
ZANU–PF party regalia bearing the image of President Robert Mugabe in the 2008 general election.

At the 2008 presidential election, Morgan Tsvangirai, the MDC candidate, received the most votes, but did not gain an absolute majority; thus a runoff was necessary. Initial results led to MDC-T claiming the required majority. However, ballots were recounted at a National Command Centre over a month without the presence of independent observers. The election process that followed was marred by more violence against and intimidation of voters and party workers. Morgan Tsvangirai initially stated he intended to contest the second round but pulled out of the runoff saying a free and fair election was impossible in the current climate. The elections were held on 27 June with a single candidate, Robert Mugabe, who was re-elected.

Many blame ZANU–PF for neglecting to deal with Zimbabwe's problem with the mounting 2008 Zimbabwean cholera outbreak, which by the start of December 2008 had already killed between 500 and 3,000 people.

Former President of South Africa Thabo Mbeki facilitated, under the auspices of Southern African Development Community (SADC), a Zimbabwean Government of National Unity between ZANU–PF, the Movement for Democratic Change – Tsvangirai and the Movement for Democratic Change – Mutambara.

=== Post-Mugabe transition ===
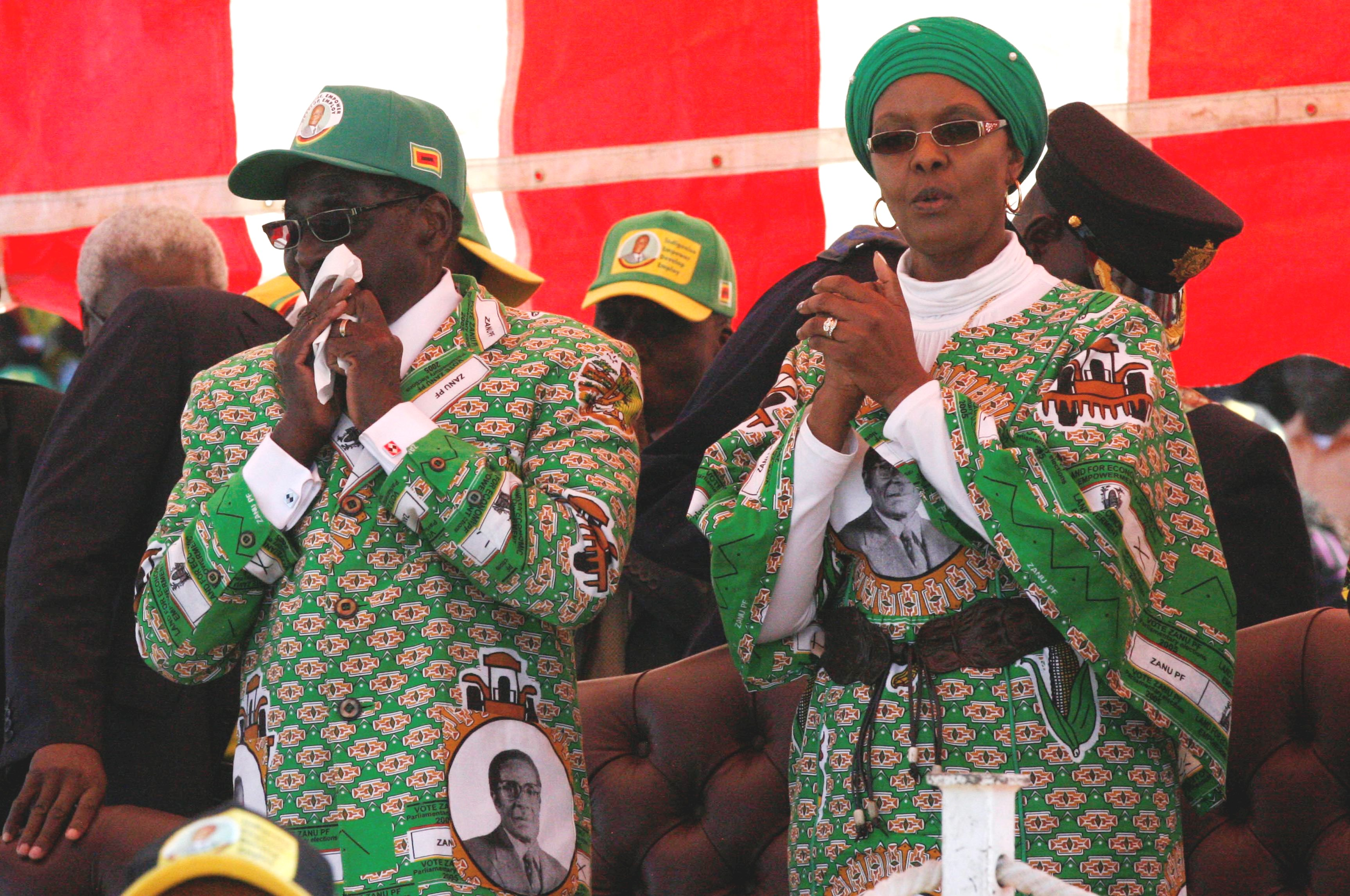
Robert and Grace Mugabe at a ZANU–PF rally in 2013.

In 2014, a battle between Vice President Joice Mujuru and Justice Minister Emmerson Mnangagwa, and possibly First Lady Grace Mugabe, began over the succession to President Robert Mugabe. An elective congress was scheduled for December 2014, in which ZANU–PF would elect members to fill vacancies in the central committee, politburo, and presidium, and most likely endorse the party's next candidate for president. This congress, which takes place every five years, is the most important elective organ for the party.

Although President Mugabe had not named a successor, Joice Mujuru was seen by many as the most likely candidate. She had support from both the politburo and the population at large (demonstrated by the election of her loyalists to the youth league). Minister Emmerson Mnangagwa was supported by a smaller group composed mainly of senior members of the security establishment, part of ZANU–PF's parliamentary caucus, younger party members and a few influential members of the Zimbabwean business community. He had been with Mugabe since Zimbabwe gained independence and was regarded by many as a successor who could maintain stability after Mugabe eventually left office.

Mujuru lost the succession battle with Mnangagwa after being expelled from the party in 2015 and a new power struggle began between Mnangagwa's faction (known as Team Lacoste) and Grace Mugabe's faction (known as Generation 40 or G40) which had become violent by 2017. Emmerson Mnangagwa was demoted from Minister of Justice following a cabinet reshuffle, soon after he publicly claimed that he was poisoned, in early-October 2017. On 15 November 2017, a military coup in Zimbabwe resulted in President Robert Mugabe being placed under house arrest and led to speculation over whether Grace Mugabe or Emmerson Mnangagwa would succeed him as leader of the party. Following the 2017 Zimbabwe coup, ZANU–PF voted to depose Robert Mugabe as party leader and install the banished Emmerson Mnangagwa as leader instead. Before the Zimbabwean parliament could vote to impeach Mugabe, he resigned from the presidency on 21 November 2017. Mnangagwa was sworn in as the new President of the Republic of Zimbabwe on 24 November 2017.

Presidential and parliamentary elections were held in July 2018, 9 months after the military coup that removed Mugabe, and were the first elections since independence where he wasn't an official candidate. ZANU-PF won with the narrowest margin since the 2008 elections, but they weren't considered free or fair and the main opposition coalition, the MDC Alliance, accused the government of rigging the vote. Just after the elections, supporters of ZANU–PF attacked the residencies of some opposition leaders.

On 6 September 2019, Robert Mugabe died of cancer (according to Mnangagwa) at the age of 95.

In the March 2022 by-elections, ZANU–PF performed poorly compared to the Citizens Coalition for Change (CCC). ZANU–PF won the 2023 Zimbabwean general election although the opposition CCC condemned them as being farcical. International observers expressed concerns over its conduct while the US Department of State stated that the country’s electoral process did not meet regional and international standards for credibility.

== Ideology ==
It has been described from the outside as African nationalist. The party maintains a Secretariat, Politburo and a Central Committee.

=== Land redistribution ===
Mugabe pursued a more left-wing populist policy on the issue of land redistribution in 2000s, encouraging seizure of commercial farms—usually owned by Zimbabwe's white minority—"for the benefit of landless black majority". The inauguration speech of President Mnangagwa threw this program's support into question since he said that the "government is committed to work on a compensation plan for former land owners." The compulsory acquisition of commercial farmland without compensation was discontinued in early 2018. In 2018, Mnangagwa stated that "all foreign investments will be safe in Zimbabwe" and called for "increased production and capacity and new investment in the country."

== Organisation and structure ==
The ZANU–PF constitution establishes a hierarchical party structure consisting of: (1) the National People's Congress, (2) the National People's Conference, (3) the Central Committee, (4) the National Consultative Assembly, (5) the National Assembly of the Women's League, (6) the National Assembly of the Youth League, (7) the provincial coordinating committees, (8) the provincial executive councils, (9) the district committees, (10) the branch committees, and (11) the cell/village committees.

The current first secretary of ZANU–PF, reelected at the party's elective congress on 28 October 2022, is President Emmerson Mnangagwa. The other three members of the party's presidium, appointed by Mnangagwa on 29 October 2022, are Second Secretaries Constantino Chiwenga and Kembo Mohadi, and National Chairperson Oppah Muchinguri.

The party maintains a Women's League and Youth League. A third wing, the War Veterans' League, was established in 2022 and held its inaugural conference on 9 September of that year.

=== Congresses ===
- 1st National People's Congress (December 1989)
- 2nd National People's Congress (December 1994)
- 3rd National People's Congress (December 1999)
- 4th National People's Congress (December 2004)
- Extraordinary Congress (December 2007)
- 5th National People's Congress (December 2009)
- 6th National People's Congress (December 2014)
- Extraordinary Congress (12–17 December 2017)
- 7th National People's Congress (December 2022)

== International relations ==
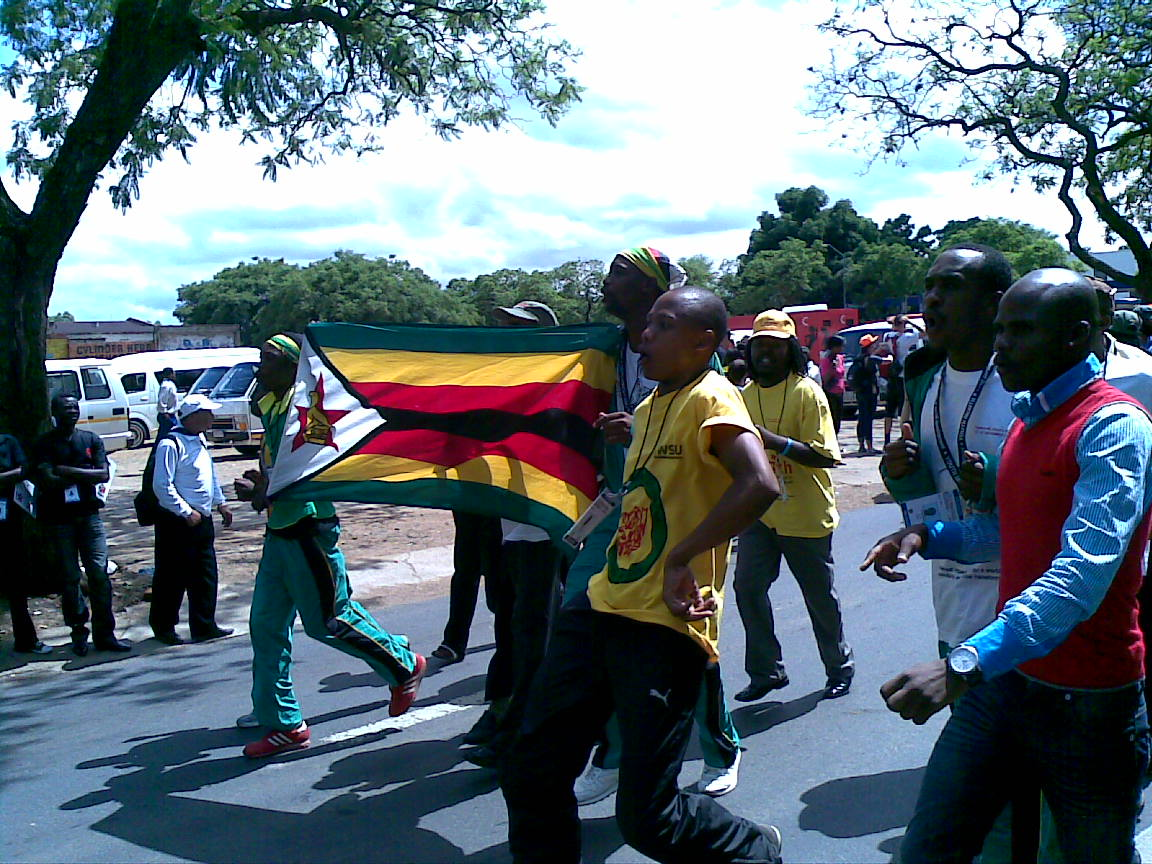
Delegates from Zimbabwe and the ZANU–PF Youth League dance at the closing of the World Festival of Youth and Students in Johannesburg, 2010.

ZANU–PF is a member of the Former Liberation Movements of Southern Africa, an association of six socialist political parties that were involved in the nationalist and anti-colonialist movements of Southern Africa. ZANU–PF was previously affiliated with the Socialist International (SI), having sent representatives with guest status to the SI congresses in 1980, 1992, and 1996, and was present at the Socialist International Africa Committee meeting in Maputo, Mozambique, as recently as 1999. ZANU–PF has not attended any SI congresses or meetings since, and Zimbabwe's then-leading opposition party, the Movement for Democratic Change – Tsvangirai, joined the SI in 2008. The Socialist International has condemned the actions of Zimbabwe's ZANU–PF-dominated government and military.

== Electoral history ==
=== Presidential elections ===
Election	Party candidate	Votes	%	Votes	%	Result
Election	Party candidate	First Round		Second Round		Result
1990	Robert Mugabe	2,026,976	83.05%	—	—	Elected ✓
1996	Robert Mugabe	1,404,501	92.76%	—	—	Elected ✓
2002	Robert Mugabe	1,685,212	56.20%	—	—	Elected ✓
2008	Robert Mugabe	1,079,730	43.24%	2,150,269	90.22%	Elected ✓
2013	Robert Mugabe	2,110,434	61.88%	—	—	Elected ✓
2018	Emmerson Mnangagwa	2,460,463	51.44%	—	—	Elected ✓
2023	Emmerson Mnangagwa	2,350,711	52.60%	—	—	Elected ✓

=== National Assembly elections ===
Election	Party leader	Votes	%	Seats	+/–	Position	Result
1980	Robert Mugabe	1,668,992	62.99% (Note: 63% of Common Roll votes. In the 1980 elections, two rolls of voters existed: the Common Role, which contained nonwhites and formed the vast majority of voters, and the White Roll, which contained white voters and formed a small minority of voters.)	57 / 100	▲57	▲1st	Majority government
1985	Robert Mugabe	2,233,320	77.19%	64 / 100	▲7	1st	Majority government
1990	Robert Mugabe	1,690,071	80.55%	117 / 120	▲53	1st	Supermajority government
1995	Robert Mugabe	1,143,349	81.38%	118 / 120	▲1	1st	Supermajority government
2000	Robert Mugabe	1,211,284	48.47%	62 / 120	▼56	1st	Majority government
2005	Robert Mugabe	1,569,867	59.59%	78 / 120	▲16	1st	Majority government
2008	Robert Mugabe	1,110,649	45.84%	99 / 210	▲19	▼2nd	ZANU PF–MDC coalition government
2013	Robert Mugabe	2,116,116	63.16%	196 / 270	▲97	▲1st	Supermajority government
2018	Emmerson Mnangagwa	2,477,708	52.35%	179 / 270	▼17	1st	Majority government
2023	Emmerson Mnangagwa	2,515,607	56.18%	177 / 280	▼2	1st	Majority government

=== Senate elections ===
Election	Party leader	Votes	%	Seats	+/–	Position	Result
2005	Robert Mugabe	449,860	73.71%	43 / 66	▲43	▲1st	Governing majority
2008	Robert Mugabe	1,101,931	45.79%	57 / 93	▼2	1st	ZANU PF–MDC governing coalition
2013	Robert Mugabe	2,120,634	64.27%	37 / 80	▼20	1st	Governing minority
2018	Emmerson Mnangagwa	—	—	34 / 80	▼3	1st	Governing minority
2023	Emmerson Mnangagwa	—	—	33 / 80	▼1	1st	Governing minority

== See also ==
- List of political parties in Zimbabwe
- List of ruling political parties by country
- Politics of Zimbabwe
