= Geneva Conference (1976) =

Meetings discussing a new Rhodesian constitution and an end to the Bush War

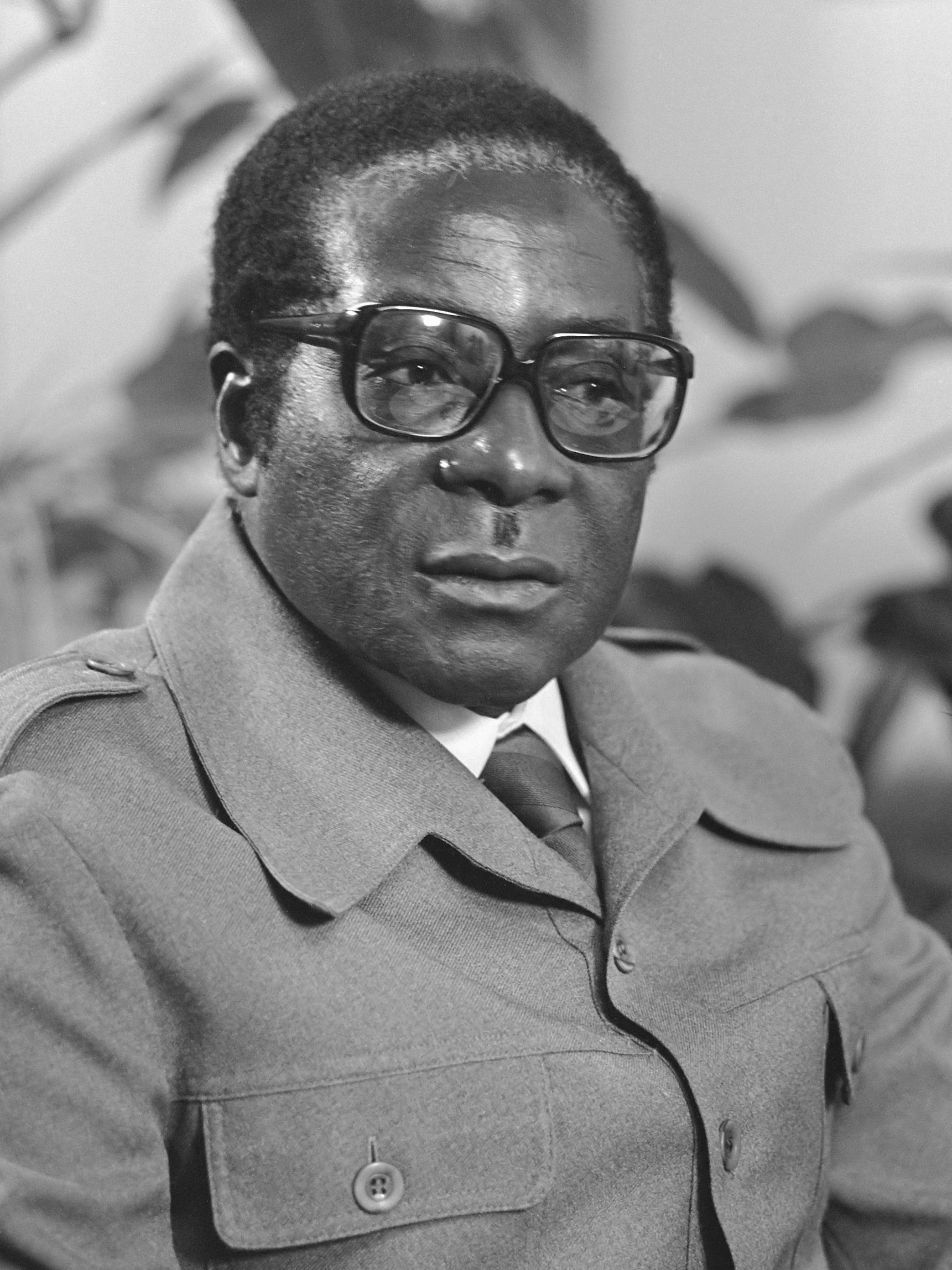
Mugabe in 1979

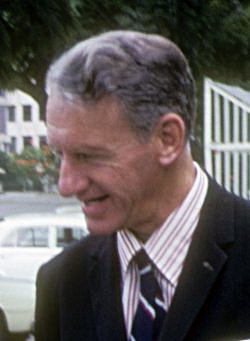
Smith in 1975

Rhodesian Prime Minister Ian Smith (right) and Robert Mugabe of the Patriotic Front (left)

The Geneva Conference (28 October – 14 December 1976) took place in Geneva, Switzerland during the Rhodesian Bush War. Held under British mediation, its participants were the unrecognised government of Rhodesia, led by Ian Smith, and a number of rival Rhodesian black nationalist parties: the African National Council, led by Bishop Abel Muzorewa; the Front for the Liberation of Zimbabwe, led by James Chikerema; and a joint "Patriotic Front" made up of Robert Mugabe's Zimbabwe African National Union and the Zimbabwe African People's Union led by Joshua Nkomo. The purpose of the conference was to attempt to agree on a new constitution for Rhodesia and in doing so find a way to end the Bush War raging between the government and the guerrillas commanded by Mugabe and Nkomo respectively.

The Geneva Conference had its origins in the South African "détente" policy instituted in late 1974, and more directly in the peace initiative headed by the United States Secretary of State, Henry Kissinger, earlier in 1976. After the Kissinger plan was rejected by the nationalists, talks were organised in Geneva by Britain to try to salvage a deal. The proceedings began on 28 October 1976, eight days behind schedule, and were chaired by a British mediator, Ivor Richard, who offended both delegations before the conference even started. When Richard read an opening statement from British prime minister James Callaghan which referred to the country as "Zimbabwe", the nationalists were somewhat placated, while Smith's team was insulted yet further. Little progress was made during the two sides' discussions, causing the conference to be indefinitely adjourned on 14 December 1976. It was never reconvened.

== Background ==
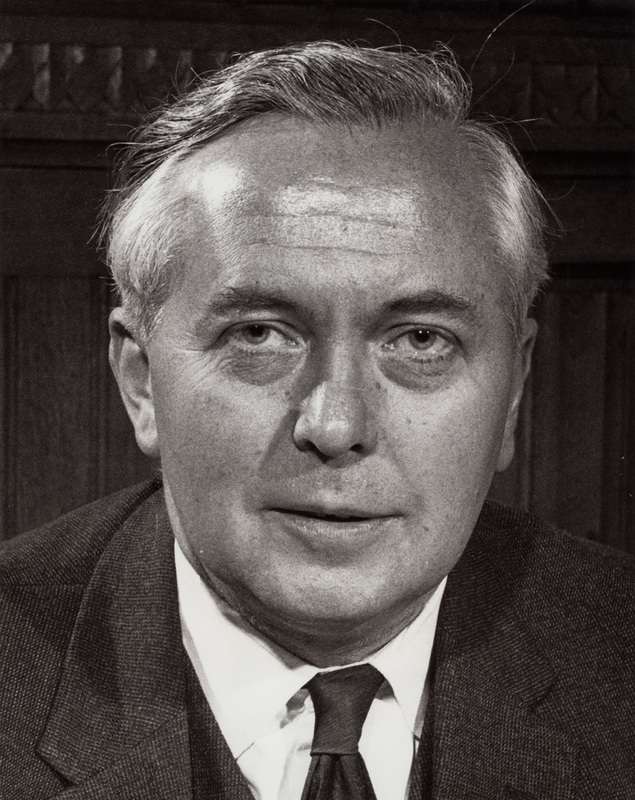
British prime minister Harold Wilson came to loggerheads with Smith over the issue of Rhodesian independence during 1964 and 1965.

Following a dispute over the terms for the granting of full statehood, the predominantly white minority government of Rhodesia, headed by Prime Minister Ian Smith, unilaterally declared independence from Britain on 11 November 1965. Because British prime minister Harold Wilson and Whitehall had been insisting on an immediate transfer to majority rule before independence, this declaration went unrecognised and caused Britain and the United Nations (UN) to impose economic sanctions on Rhodesia.

The two most prominent black nationalist parties in Rhodesia were the Zimbabwe African National Union (ZANU)—a predominantly Shona movement, influenced by Chinese Maoism—and the Zimbabwe African People's Union (ZAPU), which was Marxist–Leninist, and mostly Ndebele. ZANU and its military wing, the Zimbabwe African National Liberation Army (ZANLA), received considerable backing in training, materiel and finances from the People's Republic of China and its allies, while the Warsaw Pact and associated nations, prominently Cuba, gave similar support to ZAPU and its Zimbabwe People's Revolutionary Army (ZIPRA). ZAPU and ZIPRA were headed by Joshua Nkomo throughout their existence, while the Reverend Ndabaningi Sithole founded and initially led ZANU. The two rival nationalist movements launched what they called their "Second Chimurenga" (Note: Chimurenga is a Shona word meaning "revolutionary struggle". The "First Chimurenga" in question is the Second Matabele War, fought by the Ndebele and Shona peoples (separately) against the rule of Cecil Rhodes's British South Africa Company between 1896 and 1897.) against the Rhodesian government and security forces during the mid-1960s. The army, air force and police successfully repulsed numerous guerrilla incursions, most of which were perpetrated by ZIPRA, over the rest of that decade.

After abortive talks between Smith and Wilson in 1966 and 1968, a constitution was agreed upon by the Rhodesian and British governments in November 1971; however, when a British test of Rhodesian public opinion was undertaken in early 1972, black opinion was judged to be against the new deal, causing it to be shelved. The Rhodesian Bush War suddenly re-erupted in December 1972, after two years of relative inactivity, when ZANLA attacked Altena and Whistlefield Farms in north-eastern Rhodesia. After a successful security force counter-campaign during 1973 and 1974, drastic changes in the foreign policy of the Rhodesian government's two main backers, Portugal and South Africa, caused the conflict's momentum to shift in the nationalists' favour. In April 1974, the Portuguese government was overthrown by a military coup and replaced with a leftist administration in favour of ending the unpopular Colonial War in Angola, Mozambique and Portugal's other African territories.

The institution by Pretoria of a détente initiative in late 1974 forced a ceasefire in Rhodesia, and in June 1975 Mozambique became independent from Portugal under a communist government allied with ZANU. Unsuccessful rounds of talks were held between the Rhodesian government and the nationalists, united under the banner of Abel Muzorewa's African National Council, across the Victoria Falls Bridge in August 1975, then directly between the government and ZAPU starting in December 1975. Around this time, Robert Mugabe replaced Sithole as ZANU leader, winning an internal leadership election which Sithole refused to recognise. Guerrilla incursions picked up strongly in the first months of 1976, leading Smith to declare on the evening of 6 February 1976 that "a new terrorist offensive has begun and, to defeat it, Rhodesians will have to face heavier military commitments." Security force reports indicated that around 1,000 insurgent fighters were active within Rhodesia, with a further 15,000 encamped in various states of readiness in Mozambique.

== Prelude: Kissinger initiative ==
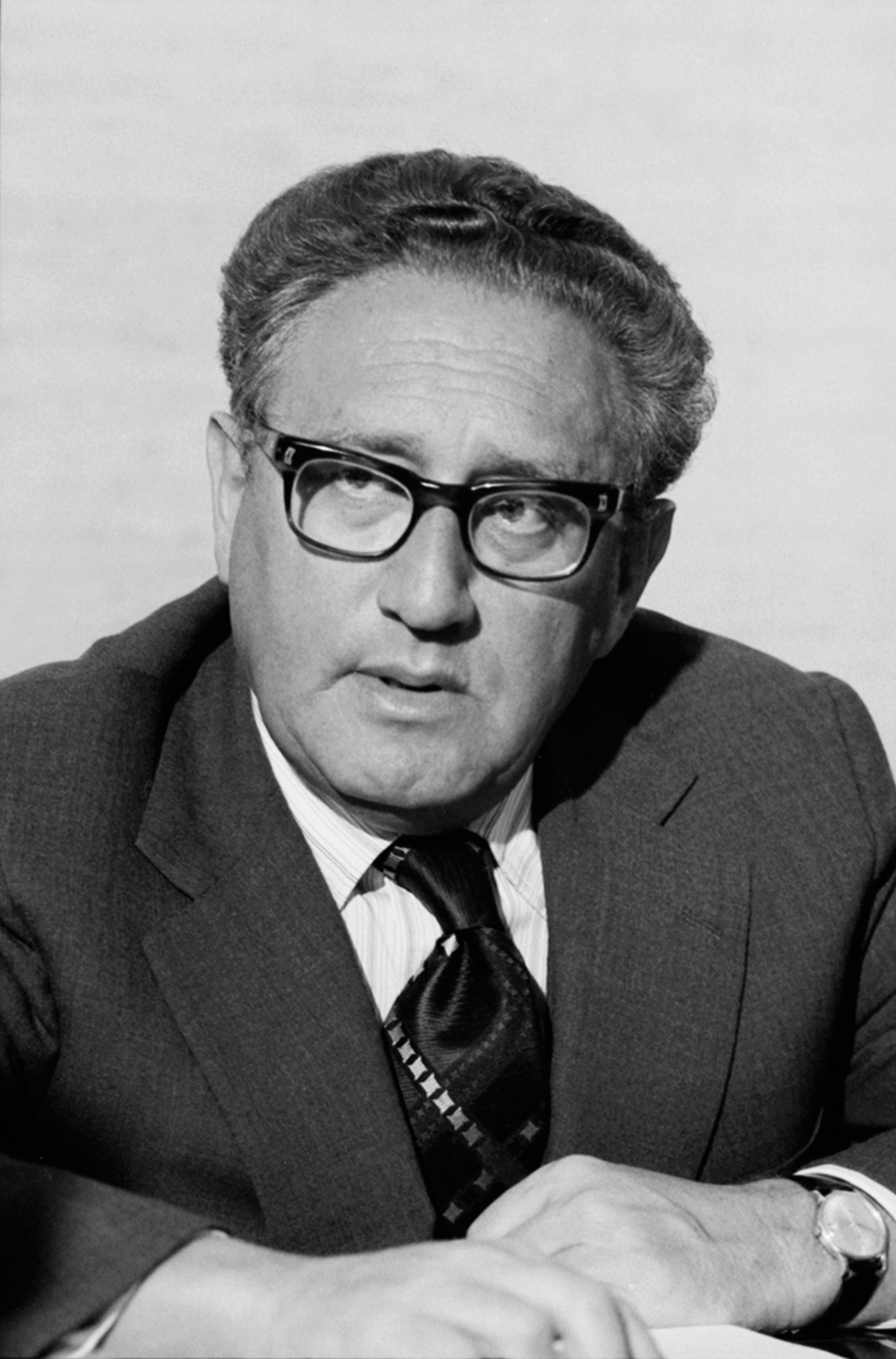
Henry Kissinger, pictured in 1976, attempted to thrash out a Rhodesian peace deal during that year.

The United States Secretary of State, Henry Kissinger, announced a formal interest in the Rhodesian situation in February 1976, and spent the rest of the year holding discussions with the British, South African and Frontline (Note: The Frontline States were a group of countries aiming to achieve black majority rule in the Republic of South Africa. In 1975 they were Zambia, Tanzania, Mozambique, Botswana and Angola.) governments to produce a mutually satisfactory proposal. The plan that Kissinger eventually presented would give a transition period of two years before majority rule began, during which time an interim government would take control while a specially convened "council of state", made up of three whites, three blacks and a white chairman, drew up a new constitution. This constitution would have to result in majority rule at the end of the two-year interim period. This plan was supported by Kenneth Kaunda and Julius Nyerere, the presidents of Zambia and Tanzania respectively, which South African Prime Minister B. J. Vorster said guaranteed its acceptance by the black nationalists. Vorster had no reply when Smith ventured that he had said the same thing before the Victoria Falls talks in 1975, when Kaunda and Nyerere had agreed on no preconditions for talks, then allowed the nationalists to seek them.

Smith met Kissinger in Pretoria on 18 September 1976 to discuss the terms. The American diplomat told the prime minister that although he was obliged to take part, his participation in what he termed the "demise of Rhodesia" was "one of the great tragedies of my life". All the same, he encouraged Smith strongly to accept the deal he placed on the table, though he knew it was unpalatable, as any future offer could only be worse. Western opinion was already "soft and decadent", Kissinger warned, and would become even more so if, as projected, American President Gerald Ford lost that year's presidential election to Jimmy Carter. A session including Kissinger, Smith and Vorster then began, and here Smith relayed his concern that his acceptance could be perceived by the Rhodesian electorate as "selling out" and could cause a mass exodus of skilled workers and investment, which would in turn severely damage the country's economy. Vorster requested a break in the session and took Smith's team into a private side-room, accompanied by South African Foreign Minister Hilgard Muller. There he privately informed Smith that it was no longer viable for South Africa to support Rhodesia financially and militarily, and that Smith should make up his mind quickly and announce his acceptance that evening. This ultimatum deeply shocked the Rhodesian team; two of Smith's ministers, Desmond Lardner-Burke and Jack Mussett, were unable to contain their anger and vociferously berated the South African prime minister for his "irresponsibility", leading Vorster to rise from his seat without a word and leave the room.

The Rhodesians were then summoned back out into the main lounge, where Kissinger insisted that their prime minister sit next to him. "Ian Smith made accepting the deal worse by acting like a gentleman," Kissinger later said. Vorster opened the discussion by announcing that he had applied no pressure to the Rhodesian delegates, which caused further consternation amongst the Rhodesians which they had difficulty suppressing. It was agreed that the Rhodesians should return to Salisbury and consult their cabinet, then announce their answer. Despite expressing "incredulity" at what had happened in Pretoria, and showing deep reluctance, the politicians in Salisbury resolved that despite what they perceived as "South African treachery" the responsible course of action could only be to go on with the peace process, and that meant accepting Kissinger's terms, which they agreed were better than any they could get in the future should they refuse. Smith announced his government's answer on the evening of 24 September 1976: "Yes." South Africa's wavering financial and military assistance suddenly became available again, (Note: A R$20 million loan to the Rhodesian Ministry of Defence from the South African government, which had been held up, was granted days after Salisbury accepted Kissinger's terms. Shipments of supplies which were six months overdue suddenly came forward. South African Minister of Defence Magnus Malan said that he "now had the political directive" to provide assistance again. South African Air Force chief Bob Rogers informed Salisbury that his men were now authorised to train Rhodesian Air Force pilots to fly Mirage fighter jets without charge, and that they would not be withdrawing South African helicopter crews from Rhodesia as had been previously indicated.) but the Frontline States then abruptly changed tack and turned the Kissinger terms down, saying that any interim period before majority rule was unacceptable. A new constitutional conference in Geneva, Switzerland, was hastily organised by Britain to try to salvage something from the wreckage, with 20 October 1976 set as the start date.

== Geneva Conference ==
Rhodesia (highlighted in green) and Geneva

ZANU and ZAPU announced on 9 October that they would attend this conference and any thereafter as a joint "Patriotic Front" (PF), including members of both parties under a combined leadership. Kaunda and Nyerere welcomed the new negotiations, but with the Soviet Union proposing that they once again alter their line, the talks were delayed indefinitely. In an attempt to encourage the other parties to travel to Switzerland, British mediator Ivor Richard asked the Rhodesian delegation to hasten their arrival, which they did, leaving Salisbury on 20 October 1976. (Note: The Rhodesian government delegation for the Geneva Conference was made up of Prime Minister Ian Smith, Deputy Prime Minister and Minister of Finance David Smith (no relation), Minister of Foreign Affairs P K van der Byl, Minister of Lands, Water Development and Natural Resources Mark Partridge, and Hilary Squires, Minister of Justice and Law and Order.) Richard himself did not arrive until two days later. Some of the guerrillas arriving for the conference from the heat of Mozambique were unprepared for the Swiss winter: Rex Nhongo, (Note: "Rex Nhongo" was the chimurenga name (nom de guerre) of Solomon Tapfumaneyi Mutuswa, who changed his surname to Mujuru during the mid-1970s. Nhongo is Shona for "male goat".) for example, felt so cold that he turned every heating appliance in his room, including the stove, to maximum and went to sleep. When the room caught fire, he was forced to jump from the balcony in his pyjamas.

Even arranging the conference proved a struggle, with the Rhodesians taking exception to being served cards of admittance on 27 October denoting them "The Smith Delegation", rather than the "Rhodesian Government Delegation" as had happened in previous conferences and correspondence. The Rhodesians unilaterally altered their cards to this effect, then confronted Richard with them, causing him some shock. The conference was eventually arranged to commence on 28 October at 15:00, but at very short notice the British mediator delayed the start for two hours; some Patriotic Front delegates were questioning his role as chairman and threatening not to attend, and Richard hoped to talk them around in the extra time. (Note: Political historian Eliakim Sibanda writes that the PF delegates found Richard to be "an amateur, unsophisticated and incompetent". Nkomo describes the British mediator in his memoirs as "a cold person, uneasy in private talks and formal meetings alike ... [who] made no useful contributions.") When the parties finally met, some hours later than planned, Muzorewa sat opposite Smith as the leader of the nationalist delegates, as at Victoria Falls, but with empty seats directly either side of him, marked "Comrade Enos Nkala" and "Comrade Edson Sithole" respectively—each of these ZANU cadres had refused to attend the opening meeting despite Richard's entreaties. The mediator read an opening statement from British prime minister James Callaghan which, to the nationalists' delight and the government's chagrin, referred to the country as "Zimbabwe". The proceedings were then adjourned, to start again the next day.

On the morning of 29 October, Mugabe and Nkomo spoke in turn, giving emotionally charged speeches about the "dreadful sacrifices which the white governments have exacted from the poor black people". Neither made any comment relevant to a new constitution. Muzorewa then told the story of the life of the Ndebele King Lobengula in reverent tones, before Sithole made the only directly relevant nationalist contribution of the day, saying simply that he hoped the two sides could come to an agreement. A few days' break were then agreed as constitutional lawyers drew up a plan based on Kissinger's for the delegates to discuss. The American election result came through on the morning of 2 November 1976; as expected, Carter had won. In Geneva, meanwhile, it soon became clear that while the Rhodesians wished to stick to the plan they had agreed with Kissinger, the nationalists had no intention of doing so, regarding those terms only as a starting point for further negotiation. They continually interrupted the lawyers' work with new demands, meaning that by 8 November practically no progress had been made.

A meeting was organised for the next day, 9 November: the chaotic parley led nowhere, with the nationalists once again taking turns to make long, irrelevant speeches while the Rhodesians attempted to have Richard return the subject to the new constitution. Smith, who had earlier supported Richard as mediator in the face of the nationalists' criticism, became very frustrated by Richard's refusal to be firm with the PF and restore order to the proceedings. Unproductive discussions continued for another month, with Mugabe persistently arriving late to the meetings. When Rhodesian minister P K van der Byl confronted Mugabe about his tardiness and tersely demanded an apology, the ZANU leader became enraged and screamed, "Foul-mouthed bloody fool!"

== Abandonment ==
Finally, on 14 December 1976, British Foreign Minister Anthony Crosland announced that the conference was to be adjourned. It was never reconvened—the Patriotic Front now said that it would not return to Geneva or take part in any further talks unless immediate black rule was made the only subject for discussion. Apparently believing that the British and Rhodesians were secretly working together to prevent this, Nkomo laid down pre-conditions for any new conference. "The Rhodesian situation is a war situation ... On our side it is the Patriotic Front, and on the British ... side it is the British government with the Rhodesian régime as [its] extension. ... The agenda must have only one item ... the transfer of power from the minority to the majority. This means a constitution based on universal adult suffrage. ... This item should take four to five days."

== Notes and references ==
=== Bibliography ===
- Abbott, Peter; Botham, Philip (June 1986). Modern African Wars: Rhodesia, 1965–80. Oxford: Osprey Publishing. ISBN 978-0-85045-728-5.
- Binda, Alexandre (May 2008). The Saints: The Rhodesian Light Infantry. Johannesburg: 30° South Publishers. ISBN 978-1-920143-07-7.
- Cilliers, Jakkie (December 1984). Counter-Insurgency in Rhodesia. London, Sydney & Dover, New Hampshire: Croom Helm. ISBN 978-0-7099-3412-7.
- Duignan, Peter; Gann, Lewis H (1994). Communism in Sub-Saharan Africa: a Reappraisal. Stanford, California: Hoover Press. ISBN 978-0-8179-3712-6.
- Lockley, Lt-Col R E H (July 1990). "A brief operational history of the campaign in Rhodesia from 1964 to 1978". The Lion & Tusk. 2 (1). Southampton: Rhodesian Army Association. Archived from the original on 22 August 2011.
- Moorcraft, Paul L; McLaughlin, Peter (April 2008) [1982]. The Rhodesian War: A Military History. Barnsley: Pen and Sword Books. ISBN 978-1-84415-694-8.
- Nkomo, Joshua; Harman, Nicholas (April 1984). Nkomo: The Story of My Life (First ed.). London: Methuen Publishing. ISBN 978-0-413-54500-8.
- Okoth, Assa (2006). A History of Africa: African Nationalism and the De-Colonisation Process, 1915–1995. Volume 2 (First ed.). Nairobi, Kampala and Dar es Salaam: East African Educational Publishers. ISBN 9966-25-358-0.
- Sibanda, Eliakim M (January 2005). The Zimbabwe African People's Union 1961–87: A Political History of Insurgency in Southern Rhodesia. Trenton, New Jersey: Africa Research & Publications. ISBN 978-1-59221-276-7.
- Smith, Ian (June 1997). The Great Betrayal: The Memoirs of Ian Douglas Smith. London: John Blake Publishing. ISBN 1-85782-176-9.
- Wessels, Hannes (July 2010). P K van der Byl: African Statesman. Johannesburg: 30° South Publishers. ISBN 978-1-920143-49-7.
- Witcover, Jules (1977). Marathon: The Pursuit of the Presidency, 1972–1976 (First ed.). New York: Viking Press. ISBN 978-0-670-45461-7.
- Wood, J R T (April 2008). A Matter of Weeks Rather Than Months: The Impasse Between Harold Wilson and Ian Smith: Sanctions, Aborted Settlements and War 1965–1969. Victoria, British Columbia: Trafford Publishing. ISBN 978-1-4251-4807-2.
