= Peter Mackay (journalist) =

British journalist and political activist

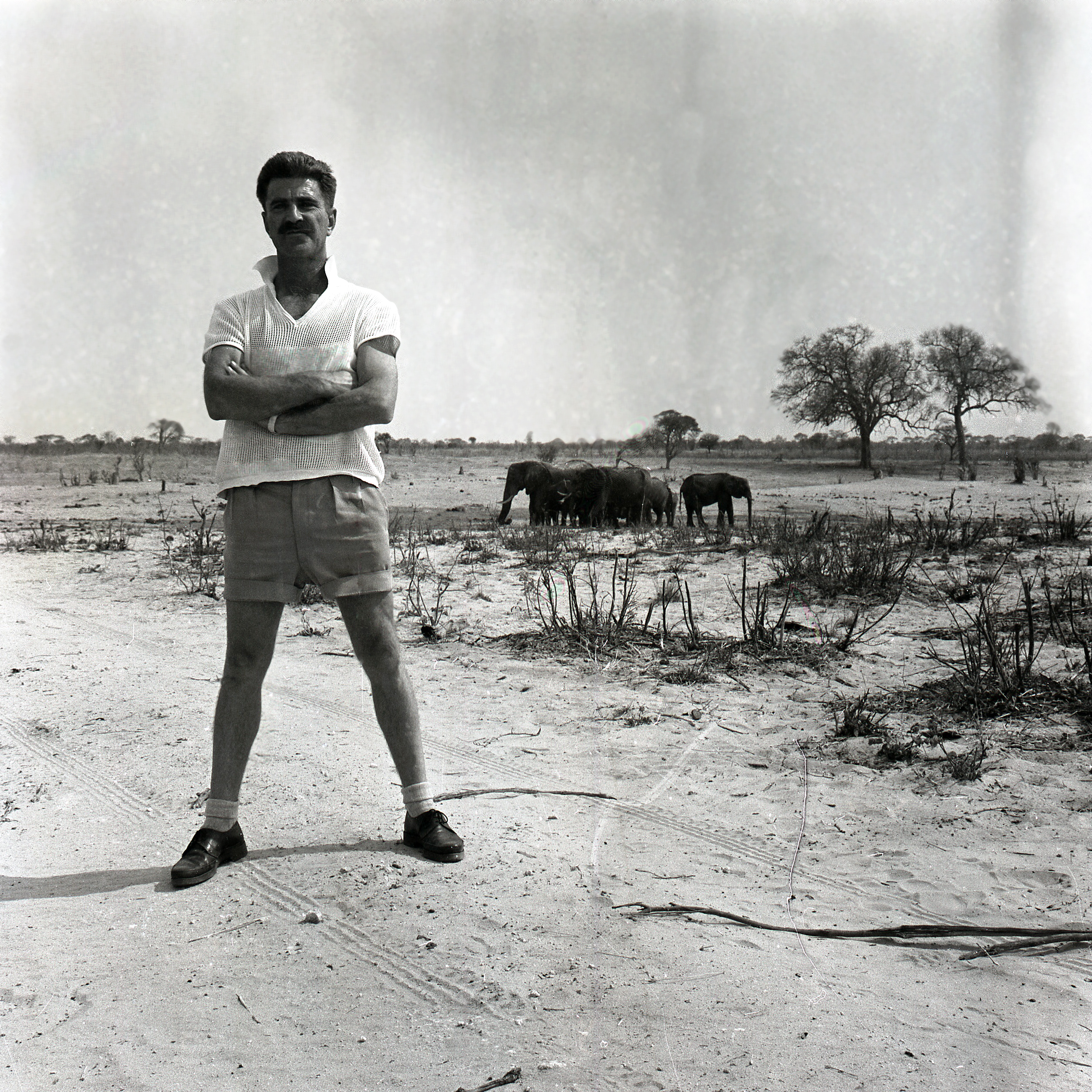
- Born: Peter John Sutherland Mackay; 31 July 1926; London, United Kingdom
- Died: 17 April 2013 (aged 86); Marondera, Zimbabwe
- Education: Temple House; Stowe School
- Known for: Campaigner, political activist, journalist, photographer and charity worker

Peter Mackay (31 July 1926 – 17 April 2013) was a British journalist and political activist in Zimbabwe, Malawi and Tanzania.

== Early life ==
Peter John Sutherland Mackay was born in London on the 31st of July 1926, his father was Major George Mackay in the Gurkha Rifles, and his mother was Christine Mackay (née Bourne). He had one sister, Jean and one brother Angus. Mackay's grandfather was the Reverend George Sutherland Mackay, who served for thirty years as minister of the United Free Church in Doune, near Stirling. Mackay had two uncles that had joined the British Army, also in the Gurkha Rifles, and Royal Air Force respectively, with a third uncle working as a tea planter in India.

Mackay was educated at Temple House, Stowe School, Buckingham-shire from 1940 to 1944, and while there he was there he was Prefect of the library before becoming a head boy in his final year. After leaving the school, he joined the Scots Guard and became the youngest captain in the Brigade of Guards at the age of twenty-one. In 1950 he quit the Army and sailed to Ruwa in Southern Rhodesia where he began training as a trainee tobacco grower. He later became a reporter on The Rhodesian Farmer, which was based in Salisbury (Harare).

== Political activities ==
The Federation of Rhodesia and Nyasaland were formed in October 1953, this is the same year that Mackay met David Stirling, the founder of the SAS and the multi-racial Capricorn Africa Society, Stirling was driven to form a federation of racial equals in Central and East Africa that would be independent but still loyal to The Queen and the Commonwealth. North Rhodesia (Zambia), South Rhodesia (Zimbabwe), Nyasaland (Malawi), Tanganyika (Tanzania), Kenya and Uganda were the countries that Stirling wanted to target, to form a buffer between the political unrest caused by the apartheid movement in South Africa, and the Nkrumah-style black nationalism which was descending from the North of Africa.

Mackay joined the Interracial Association; he worked on bringing their magazine Concord from an idea into a reality, it was the first multiracial magazine in the colonies. Mackay moved his office as the journalist Elias Mtepuka was not allowed to use the lift to enter his office in Salisbury, Mackay also rented an office in his name for Joshua Nkomo, as Nkomo was prohibited from renting an office in the European area of Salisbury. In 1955 Mackay and Chad Chipunza were the two executive officers for the Capricorn Africa Society in Salisbury, Mackay worked on preparing illustrative graphs for the Capricorn Contract.

In 1956 Mackay organised the Salima conference in Nyasaland alongside T. J. Hlazo, members of different ethnic groups attended and signed a document, the Capricorn Contract. The Capricorn Contract called on the all-white rule to be replaced with a racial partnership in the Central African Federation. Mackay left behind Stirling's Capricorn after 18 months with the society; instead he wanted to pursue working with Hastings Kamuzu Banda of Nyasaland and Joshua Nkomo of Southern Rhodesia who was making demands for majority rule.

=== Tsopano ===
Mackay wanted to make a magazine that would report in an unbiased manner unlike the articles in the Nyasaland Times. Mackay applied for a meeting with Dr. Banda, who was a political prisoner after Operation Sunrise, to discuss the magazine; however, his access to Banda was denied. Jimmy Skinner, who was a friend of Mackay's was able to gain a meeting with Banda to discuss the magazine, the original name of, 'marawi', was decided against; instead Mackay decided on Tsopano.

The first of thirteen issues was launched in 1959, the magazine was in English and was printed in Salisbury for Nyassa's, it was for the people to read an unbiased view of African feeling within Nyasaland. There were 1,200 copies printed of the first issue, and this sold out on the first day they were available to buy.

Key government initiatives were discussed within the periodical, these included; the Devlin Commission and the Monckton Commission. All issues were printed under censorship which had been enforced after the Government had declared a state of emergency in Nyasaland, at the start of 1959. The thirteenth issue was published in 1961, the Malawi Congress Party won the election, and it was reported that the Government was running out of money for advertisement. This lack of money is a theory why the fourteenth issue of the magazine has a mock version; however, a printed copy of the magazine never occurred.

Mackay edited Tsopano until Malawi gained independence, Mackay felt targeted by Banda and escaped to Rhodesia. Mackay helped to organise the March of 7,000 in 1960 through Salisbury; he linked arms with George Silundika of the Zimbabwe African People's Union (ZAPU), they sang freedom songs while they marched, the songs included Ishe Komborera Africa. The White Rhodesians were unhappy with Mackay due to the unrest caused by the March.

In 1961, Tsopano ceased printing; however, just after a year, Mackay was working on another magazine, Chapupu II. Mackay grieved the death of his friends Sketchley Samkange due to drowning in May 1961, and Dunduzu Chisiza's in a car crash in September 1962. Chapupu II was banned in 1962, copies of the magazine were burned to prevent those involved with the making of the magazine going to jail.

=== Freedom Road ===
Mackay refused to take part in the military call-up in Rhodesia and was jailed for four months as a punishment after he was released he fled for Lusaka. Mackay worked with Kenneth Kaunsa, helping refugees in Lusaka, he would ferry refugees from Portuguese ruled countries and those fleeing the apartheid movement. Mackay also became a strong supporter of the Front for the Liberation of Zimbabwe (FROLIZI), a liberation movement which was run by James Chikerema and George Nyandoro.

He was shocked to hear of the death of Yatutu Chisiza in October 1967, Yatutu was shot when he tried to overthrow Dr Banda. After Yatutu's death, Mackay never returned to Malawi, and he cut all ties with Dr Banda. Another death that shocked Mackay was Leopold Takawira's, who died in a diabetic coma when he was detained in a Rhodesian prison in June 1970.

Mackay became a human trafficker, he ran 'Freedom Road' with smuggled individuals in his Land Rover, from Francistown to Lusaka, for ZAPU and James Chikerema. Mackay smuggled hundreds of South Africans, Zimbabweans and Mozambicans into Zambia to be trained in guerrilla camps, he also transported weapons to the guerrilla camps in his Land Rover. These trained men and women forced Ian Smith to the negotiating table at Lancaster House in London in 1979.

In 1975 a letter was pushed under the door of his caravan, it declared that he was a prohibited immigrant in Africa, Mackay sent a scathing reply back. After working for nearly 20 years under George Nyandoro and James Chikerema, Mackay felt unwanted when Zimbabwe gained its independence in 1980.

=== Later life ===
Mackay moved to Omay in the Zambezi Valley, Omay was one of the most malaria-infested parts of the country in late 1980s. Mackay had been told that the people were so hungry there that they had resorted to eating grass and so Mackay went to Omay and helped set up primary schools, agricultural centres and clinics for the Batonga people. He contacted Save the Children and the Cambridge Female Education Trust (CAMFED) to help in the area, CAMFED started their support for secondary schools for African girls in Omay. When Mackay turned 70 and was going to retire, he did not want to burden the people of Omay, even though they wished for him to stay with them on land they wanted to gift him. Instead, he moved to a cottage on the grounds of a castle on Chiremba road, Harare, which was owned by his old friend Stanlake Samkange.

Mackay then moved into a small bungalow that he had bought himself in Marondera. In February 2007 thieves broke into Mackay's house, they stole money from his wallet and nearly beat him to death, this incident left him bed-bound for two years. Mackay died in the same house in Eagle Way, Marondera on the 17th of April 2013, after a long illness.
