= Bulawayo Asian Civil Rights League =

Bulawayo Asian Civil Rights League Bulawayo Civil Rights League
- Founded: 1958
- Preceded by: Lotus Group
- Headquarters: Bulawayo, Southern Rhodesia
- Newspaper: Lotus magazine
- Ideology: Anti-colonialism; African nationalism

The Bulawayo Asian Civil Rights League was a political association founded in 1958 to protest racial discrimination in Bulawayo, Southern Rhodesia. It later changed its name to the Bulawayo Civil Rights League.

== History ==
The League originated in the Lotus Group, a group of Indian anti-colonialist activists formed in 1954 opposed to what they considered an accommodationist older generation. While the older generation were unwilling to cooperate closely with African nationalists, given the lower standing of black Africans in Rhodesian society, members of the Lotus Group adopted an African nationalist position, and worked towards a transfer of power into African hands. The group subsequently established the League as a political association.

Members, who organized around a monthly magazine eponymously called Lotus, carried on debates in both the Lotus magazine and in the alternative white liberal press. Through a series of demonstrations conducted jointly between Asians and Coloureds, the League was successful in integrating the Bulawayo City Hall, the Bulawayo Public Library and the Bulawayo Theatre, thought it was unsuccessful in integrating the Bulawayo cinemas.

The members of the Lotus Group and the League progressed from Indian-based groups to emerging groups such as SRANC and the NDP. In 1961, an editor of Lotus magazine, Don. K. Naik, was elected financial secretary of the Bulawayo branch of the NDP.
