= Southern Rhodesia African National Congress =

Political party in Southern Rhodesia (1957–1959)

- Abbreviation: SRANC; ANC
- Founder: Joshua Nkomo; James Chikerema
- Founded: 12 September 1957
- Dissolved: 1959
- Merger of: City Youth League; Bulawayo-based ANC
- Succeeded by: National Democratic Party
- Ideology: Anti-racism; Nonviolent resistance (initially); Anti-segregationism; Anti-colonialism; Socialism; Progressivism; Black nationalism Pan-africanism
- Political position: Left-wing

The Southern Rhodesia African National Congress (SRANC) was a political party active between 1957–1959 in Southern Rhodesia (now modern-day Zimbabwe). Committed to the promotion of indigenous African welfare, it was the first fully fledged black nationalist organisation in the country. While short-lived — it was outlawed by the predominantly white minority government in 1959 — it marked the beginning of political action towards black majority rule in Southern Rhodesia, and was the original incarnation of the National Democratic Party (NDP); the Zimbabwe African People's Union (ZAPU); the Zimbabwe African National Union (ZANU); and the Zimbabwe African National Union — Patriotic Front (ZANU–PF), which has governed Zimbabwe continuously since 1980. Many political figures who later became prominent, including Robert Mugabe and Joshua Nkomo, were members of the SRANC.

== Beginnings ==
By the 1950s, the native peoples of Southern Rhodesia were increasingly dissatisfied with their treatment by the white minority government. In rural areas, the Native Reserves Land were overstocked and in deteriorating condition. In a response to increasing soil erosion, the government introduced the Land Husbandry Act of 1951. The bill was a failure, and did not take into consideration the ecological diversity of the land it reallocated. Problems with the Land Husbandry Act could have been rectified to better suit the native population, but it was in the best interests of the settler population to keep people on the reserves poor, thereby maintaining the unequal wealth distribution the settlers so enjoyed. The Bill saw heavy opposition by both rural farmers, and urban workers.

Strict segregation in urban areas separated the black and white populations in hospitals, hotels and schools, and prevented Africans from drinking alcoholic beverages. The Land Apportionment Act of 1930 implemented rigid policy about domestic travel within the country; requiring Blacks to present papers when travelling between areas. The Land Tenure Act of the same year reallocated Africans' land, pushing families out of their homes, and giving better areas to the white settlers. Despite being a minority, white settlers were allocated 49,100,000 acres (19,900,000 ha), while the black majority received a disproportionately small 21,100,000 acres (8,500,000 ha). Moreover, Blacks were relocated to areas with poor quality soil, endemic malaria, and tsetse fly infestations. In cities, workers had little control over conditions, because trade unions had limited power due to heavy government restrictions. Despite having established only twelve public schools for Black children by 1950, a growing educated elite of wealthy Africans was developing in the cities. Extreme racism, however, prevented the Black bourgeois from identifying with their White economic counterparts, and they sympathised instead with the plighted rural farmers on reserves.

=== Formation ===
Joshua Nkomo was a graduate of Adams College in Natal and at the Jan H. Hofmeyr School of Social Work in Johannesburg. After working on the Rhodesian Railways African Employees' Association, he was elected President of the Bulawayo-based Southern Rhodesian chapter of the African National Congress (ANC) in 1952. At the time, ANC membership included Knight TT Maripe, Jason Ziyapapa Moyo, Edward Ndlovu, and Francis Nehwati. In September 1956, the United Transport Company scheduled to increase fares to such a level that workers would be spending between 18% and 30% of their income on transportation alone. In response to the price hike, James Chikerema, George Nyandoro, Dudziye Chisiza and Edson Sithole founded the Salisbury based City Youth League (later the African Youth League), and organised a mass boycott that was successful in preventing the price change.

On 12 September 1957, the largely dormant ANC and the City Youth League merged to found the Southern Rhodesia African National Congress. The date was significant, being the 67th anniversary of Occupation Day, a holiday celebrated by the white settler population. Having proved himself a strong organiser and powerful negotiator, Joshua Nkomo was inaugurated president. James Chikerema came on as vice-president, George Nyandaro as secretary, Ziyapapa Moyo as vice secretary, Joseph Msika as treasurer, and Paul Mushonga as vice treasurer. SRANC took on a multi-ethnic executive membership from across the country, which made for a unified national organisation, and included white members such as Guy Clutton-Brock, an anti-apartheid agriculturalist.

== Ideology and organisation ==
The Southern Rhodesia Africa National Congress established itself as a nonviolent reform group, acting on platforms of universal suffrage, anti-discrimination, increased standards of living for African peoples, the eradication of racism, expanding and de-racializing the education system, free travel for all Rhodesians within the country, the inauguration of democratic systems, and direct participation in the government.

By adopting a constitution, they established themselves as the first mass resistance movement in Southern Rhodesia.

SRANC was unique in that they rallied support largely from the rural population, and addressed the grievances of farmers on the reserves. They engaged in house to house, village to village recruiting, and called upon grassroots organising and churches. They held rallies, direct confrontation demonstrations, and canvassed for support internationally.

Nkomo successfully suspended the Land Husbandry Act and openly condemned the bill in a public statement saying:

"Any act whose effects undermine the security of our small land rights, dispossess us of our little wealth in the form of cattle, disperse us from our ancestral homes in the reserves and reduce us to the status of vagabonds and as a source of cheap labour for the farmers, miners, and industrialists – such and Act will turn the African People against society to the detriment of the peace and progress of this country."

The Congress was successful in preventing government interference in traditional marriage customs, and was instrumental in the banning of Depo Provera (a birth control compound), and expressed “deep suspicion... that there is a political motive behind the scheme of birth control.”

Commitment to nonviolence, utilisation of civil disobedience, and Pan-Africanism created a likeness between SRANC and the civil rights movement happening at the same time in the United States. Said Rev. Dr. Martin Luther King Jr. of the Congress:

"Although we are separated by miles, we are closer together in mutual struggle for freedom and human brotherhood... there is no basic difference between colonialism and segregation... our struggles are not only similar; they are in a real sense one."

Until 1958, SRANC found an ally in Prime Minister Garfield Todd, who met with them regularly and attempted to introduce reforms to "advance gradually the rights of the 7,000,000 blacks without upsetting the rule of the 250,000 whites." Under his administration the minimum wage for black workers was raised, restaurants and similar establishments were given the option of being multi-racial, and restrictions on alcohol consumption were relaxed. In the Summer of 1957, Todd pushed through a reform that would increase the number of voting Africans from 2% to 16%, much to the dismay of his party.

Despite changing international opinion about colonialism, the emergence of independent African states, and the increasing momentum of civil rights movements around the globe in the 1950s and 1960s, the settler government of Southern Rhodesia remained stubbornly resistant to imperial reform. White settlers in Southern Rhodesia were threatened by the idea of advancing the black majority; the country being reliant largely on exports of cotton and tobacco, their livelihood necessitated access to cheap labour. English settlers to Rhodesia had found a much improved standard of living and great wealth, and they viewed that improving conditions for the native majority was a threat to their new-found luxury.

== Todd's fall and the banning of SRANC ==
In 1958, after a one-month holiday in South Africa, Todd returned to Southern Rhodesia to discover his cabinet had resigned in protest of his liberal racial policies, and only 14 of the 24 legislators in his party supported his remaining in office. Todd refused to resign, but on 8 February, he was voted out at a United Federal Party congress and replaced by Edgar Whitehead.

On 29 February 1959, the Whitehead administration declared a state of emergency and introduced the Unlawful Organizations Act, which banned several organisations including SRANC and allowed government seizure of property. The bill was defended by the claim that SRANC had incited violence, government defiance, and “undermined [the] prestige of Native Commissioners and the loyalty of African Police," said a security intelligence report. Between 1960 and 1965, 1,610 Africans were prosecuted and 1,002 convicted under this law.

The Preventative Detention Act allowed the government to detain several hundred members of SRANC without trial; some members were detained for four years in "shockingly insulting" conditions, while white member Guy Clutton-Brock was released in under a month. Nkomo, who was attending a conference in Cairo on his way to London, was not detained; he remained in London organising or on speaking tours to rally support until returning home on 1 October 1960.

The Native Affairs Amendment Act went even further to prevent nationalist activities, by banning meetings of 12 or more natives that would "undermine the authority" of the government. This prevented rural organising, severely limited freedom of speech, and marked the end of nonviolent resistance in Southern Rhodesia. To appease the black elite, Whitehead conceded a few liberal reforms to benefit wealthy, educated, urban Africans.

== Later history and Zimbabwean independence ==
Despite the Whitehead and Smith administrations' attempts to prevent nationalism and resist anti-discrimination reform, the Southern Rhodesia African National Congress re-emerged several times with the same leadership and ideology under different names. Constant repression by the white minority government contributed to the increasing militarisation of these splinter organisations, which culminated in a 15-year war, leading to the internationally acknowledged independence of Zimbabwe in 1980.

== The NDP, ZAPU and the "mother of all splits" to form ZANU in 1963 ==
On 1 January 1960, the National Democratic Party replaced the Southern Rhodesia African National Congress, Chikerema and Nyandoro became members while still detained, and Nkomo came on as president on 28 November 1960. The NDP was an ideologically identical organisation to SRANC, although rural organising was nearly impossible after the Native Affairs Amendment Act. After a few years the NDP was banned, only to be replaced shortly thereafter by ZAPU, which was led by Nkomo, and then ZANU, a splinter group from ZAPU largely on ethnic grounds, which was led by Ndabaningi Sithole, and later Robert Mugabe.

The split was dubbed the "Mother of all Splits" because ZANU broke away from several other significant attempts at achieving unity between ZAPU and them; notably the "ZIPA" (1975 and PF(1979–80) accords. Some historians suggest that Ken Flower, a former MI6 agent, was instrumental in the formation of ZANU in the interest of preserving and perpetuating white dominance and imperial agenda over Africans. In 1963, both organisations were banned, but in July 1964, the Second Chimurenga (aka the "Zimbabwe War of Liberation" or "the Rhodesian Bush War") began, and both organisations re-emerged with armed wings, Zimbabwe People's Revolutionary Army (ZIPRA) and Zimbabwe African National Liberation Army (ZANLA). These groups were provided weaponry from communist nations including Soviet Union and then China, and used guerrilla and traditional warfare. The war waged until the Lancaster House Agreement of 1979, and Mugabe became Prime Minister of Zimbabwe in April 1980.

Joshua Nkomo became the first Minister of Home Affairs in 1980 until ZANU, under the leadership of Mugabe and Tsvangirai(then a Youth Chairperson of ZANU-Jongwe), unleashed violence, and massacred ZAPU members in Matababeland, Midlands, Manicalland,Mashonaland West, Mashonaland East and part of Masvingo Province, in what is now popularly known as the Gukurahundi Massacres.

In 1987, Nkomo was appointed Vice-President, an office he held for twelve years. Mugabe's administration proved controversial, and, as a leader, he has met serious opposition and criticism on the grounds of human rights abuses.
