= Victoria Falls Conference (1975) =

1975 talks between Rhodesia and Zambia

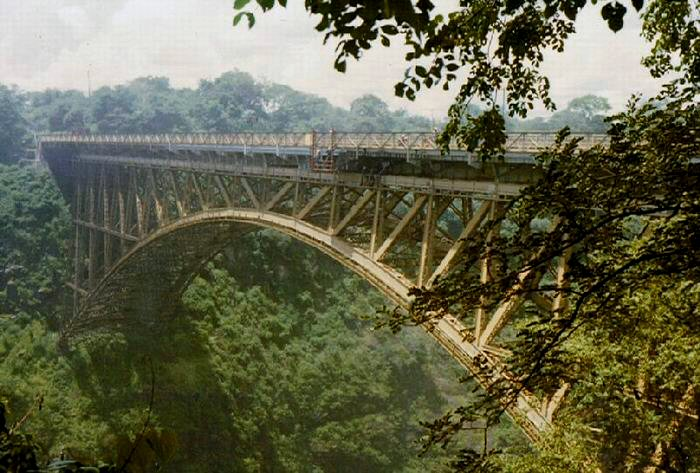
The Victoria Falls Bridge, seen from the Rhodesian side in 1975. Talks between the African National Council and the Rhodesian government took place at the centre of the bridge on 26 August that year.

The Victoria Falls Conference took place on 26 August 1975 aboard a South African Railways train halfway across the Victoria Falls Bridge on the border between the unrecognised state of Rhodesia (today Zimbabwe) and Zambia. It was the culmination of the "détente" policy introduced and championed by B. J. Vorster, the Prime Minister of South Africa, which was then under apartheid and was attempting to improve its relations with the Frontline States to Rhodesia's north, west and east by helping to produce a settlement in Rhodesia. The participants in the conference were a delegation led by the Rhodesian Prime Minister Ian Smith on behalf of his government, and a nationalist delegation attending under the banner of Abel Muzorewa's African National Council (UANC), which for this conference also incorporated delegates from the Zimbabwe African National Union (ZANU), the Zimbabwe African People's Union (ZAPU) and the Front for the Liberation of Zimbabwe (FROLIZI). Vorster and the Zambian President Kenneth Kaunda acted as mediators in the conference, which was held on the border in an attempt to provide a venue both sides would accept as neutral.

The conference failed to produce a settlement, breaking up on the same day it began with each side blaming the other for its unsuccessful outcome. Smith believed the nationalists were being unreasonable by requesting preconditions for talks—which they had previously agreed not to do—and asking for diplomatic immunity for their leaders and fighters. The nationalists contended that Smith was being deliberately intransigent and that they did not believe he was sincere in seeking an agreement if he was so adamant about not giving diplomatic immunity. Direct talks between the government and the Zimbabwe African People's Union followed in December 1975, but these also failed to produce any significant progress. The Victoria Falls Conference, the détente initiative and the associated ceasefire, though unsuccessful, did affect the course of the Rhodesian Bush War, as they gave the nationalist guerrillas significant time to regroup and reorganise themselves following the decisive security force counter-campaign of 1973–74. A further conference would follow in the Geneva Conference in 1976 .

== Background ==
Rhodesia (highlighted in green) was an unrecognised state in Africa with a mostly white minority government.

After the Wind of Change of the early 1960s, the British government under Harold Wilson and the predominantly white minority government of the self-governing colony of Rhodesia, led by the Prime Minister Ian Smith, were unable to agree terms for the latter's full independence. Rhodesia unilaterally declared independence on 11 November 1965. This was deemed illegal by Britain and the United Nations (UN), each of which imposed economic sanctions on Rhodesia.

The two most prominent black nationalist parties in Rhodesia were the Zimbabwe African National Union (ZANU)—a predominantly Shona movement, influenced by Chinese Maoism—and the Zimbabwe African People's Union (ZAPU), which was Marxist–Leninist, and mostly Ndebele. ZANU and its military wing, the Zimbabwe African National Liberation Army (ZANLA), received considerable backing in training, materiel and finances from the People's Republic of China and its allies, while the Warsaw Pact and associated nations, prominently Cuba, gave similar support to ZAPU and its Zimbabwe People's Revolutionary Army (ZIPRA). ZAPU and ZIPRA were headed by Joshua Nkomo throughout their existence, while the Reverend Ndabaningi Sithole founded and initially led ZANU. The two rival nationalist movements began what they called their "Second Chimurenga" (Note: Chimurenga is a Shona word meaning "revolutionary struggle". The "First Chimurenga" in question is the Second Matabele War, fought by the Ndebele and Shona peoples (separately) against the rule of Cecil Rhodes's British South Africa Company between 1896 and 1897.) against the Rhodesian government and security forces, and, while based outside the country, sent groups of guerrillas into Rhodesia at regular intervals. Most of these early incursions, which had little success, were perpetrated by ZIPRA.

Wilson and Smith held abortive talks aboard HMS Tiger in 1966 and HMS Fearless two years later. A constitution was agreed upon by the Rhodesian and British governments in November 1971, but when the British gauged Rhodesian public opinion in early 1972 they abandoned the deal on the grounds that they perceived most blacks to be against it. The Rhodesian Bush War suddenly re-erupted after two years of relative inactivity on 21 December 1972 when ZANLA attacked Altena Farm near Centenary in the country's north-east. The security forces mounted a strong counter-campaign and by the end of 1974 had reduced the number of guerrillas active within the country to under 300. In the period October–November 1974, the Rhodesians killed more nationalist fighters than in the previous two years combined.

== Mozambican independence and the South African "détente" initiative ==
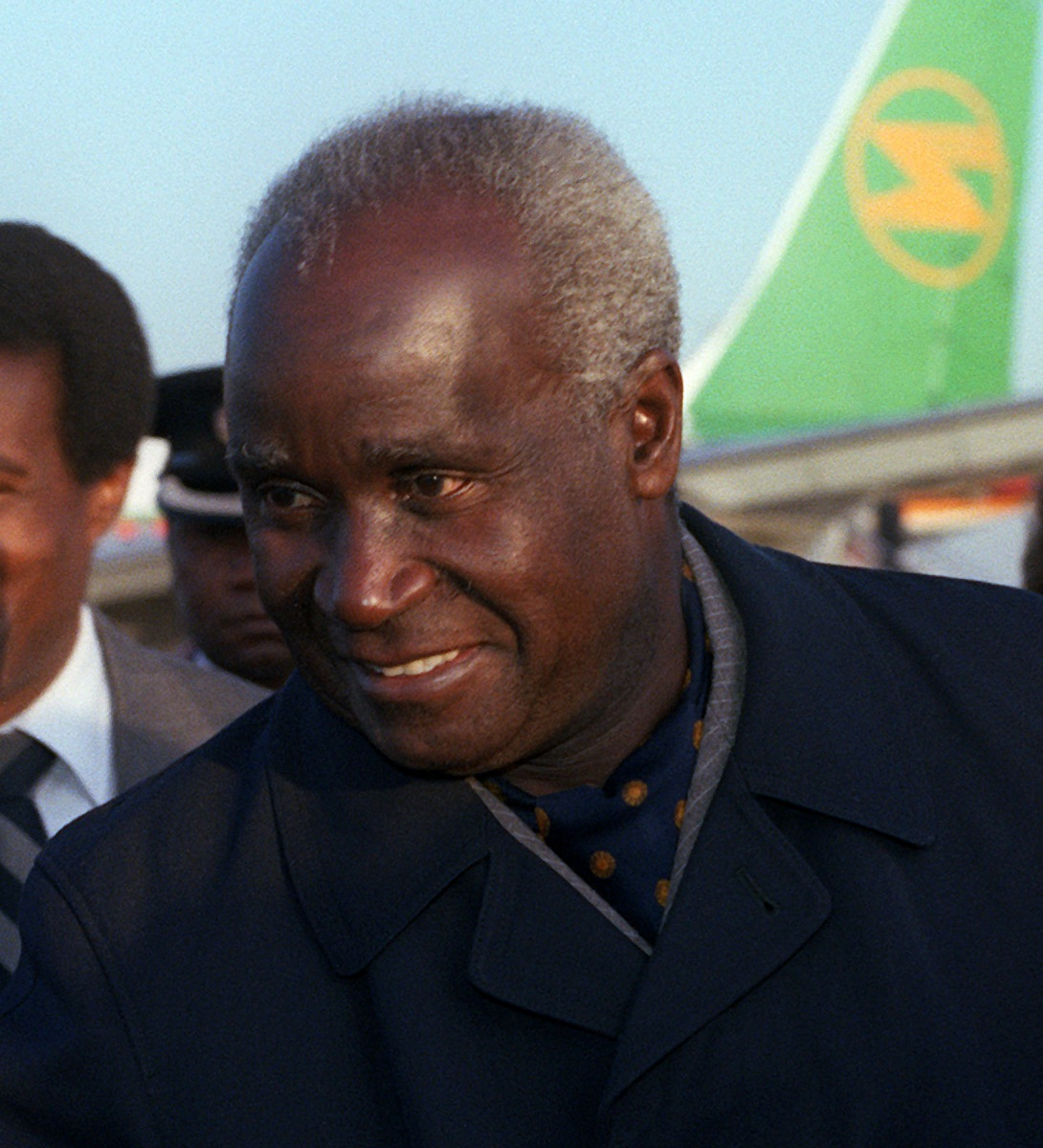
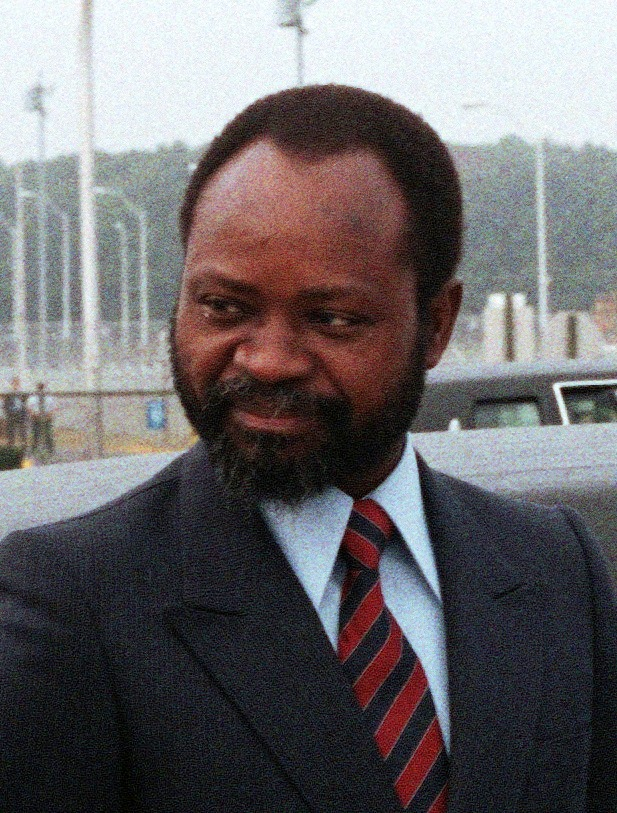
Kenneth Kaunda (left) and Samora Moisés Machel (right), both pictured in 1983

The effect of the security forces' decisive counter-campaign was undone by two drastic changes to the geopolitical situation in 1974 and 1975, each relating to one of the Rhodesian government's two main backers, Portugal and South Africa. In Lisbon, a military coup on 25 April 1974 replaced the right-wing Estado Novo administration with a leftist government opposed to the unpopular Colonial War in Angola, Mozambique and Portugal's other African territories. Following this coup, which became known as the Carnation Revolution, Portuguese leadership was hurriedly withdrawn from Lisbon's overseas territories, each of which was earmarked for an immediate handover to communist guerrillas. Brief, frenzied negotiations with FRELIMO in Mozambique preceded the country's independence on 25 June 1975; FRELIMO took power without contesting an election, while Samora Machel assumed the presidency. Now that Mozambique was under a friendly government, ZANLA could freely base themselves there with the full support of Machel and FRELIMO, with whom an alliance had already existed since the late 1960s. The Rhodesian Security Forces, on the other hand, now had a further 1,100 kilometres (680 mi) of border to defend and had to rely on South Africa alone for imports.

The second event was more surprising for the Rhodesians. In late 1974, the government of Rhodesia's main ally and backer, South Africa, adopted a doctrine of "détente" with the Frontline States. (Note: The Frontline States were a group of countries aiming to achieve black majority rule in the Republic of South Africa. In 1974 they were Zambia, Tanzania and Botswana. Angola and Mozambique each joined on achieving independence from Portugal in 1975.) In an attempt to resolve the situation in Rhodesia, the South African Prime Minister B. J. Vorster negotiated a deal: the Zambian President Kenneth Kaunda would prevent guerrilla infiltrations into Rhodesia from his country, and in return the Rhodesian Prime Minister Ian Smith would agree to a ceasefire and "release all political detainees"—the leaders of ZANU and ZAPU—who would then attend a conference in Rhodesia, united under a single banner and led by Bishop Abel Muzorewa and his African National Council (UANC). Vorster hoped that if this were successful the Frontline States would enter full diplomatic relations with South Africa and allow it to retain apartheid. Under pressure from Pretoria to accept the terms, the Rhodesians agreed on 11 December 1974 and followed the terms of the ceasefire; Rhodesian military actions were temporarily halted and troops were ordered to allow retreating guerrillas to leave unhindered. Vorster withdrew some 2,000 members of the South African Police (SAP) from forward bases in Rhodesia, and by August 1975 had pulled the SAP out of Rhodesia completely.

The nationalists, on the other hand, ignored the agreed terms and used the sudden cessation of security force activity as an opportunity to regroup and re-establish themselves both inside and outside the country. Guerrilla operations continued: an average of six incidents a day were reported inside Rhodesia over the following months. Far from being seen as a gesture of potential reconciliation, the ceasefire and release of the nationalist leaders gave the message to the rural population that the security forces had been defeated, and that the guerrillas were in the process of emulating FRELIMO's victory in Mozambique. ZANU and ZANLA were unable to totally capitalise on the situation, however, because of internal conflict which had started earlier in 1974. Some ordinary ZANU cadres perceived the ZANU High Command members in Lusaka, the Zambian capital, to be following a luxurious lifestyle, contrary to the party's Maoist principles. This culminated in the Nhari rebellion of November 1974, in which mutinous guerrillas were forcibly put down by the ZANU defence chief, Josiah Tongogara. The ZANU and ZAPU leaders imprisoned in Rhodesia were released in December 1974 as part of the "détente" deal. Robert Mugabe had been elected ZANU president while they were incarcerated, though this was disputed by its founding leader, the Reverend Ndabaningi Sithole, who continued to be recognised as such by the Frontline States. On his release, Mugabe moved into Mozambique to consolidate his supremacy within ZANU and ZANLA, while Sithole prepared to take part in talks with the Rhodesian government as part of the UANC delegation. Sithole retained the ZANU leadership in the eyes of the Frontline States until late 1975.

== The Victoria Falls Conference ==
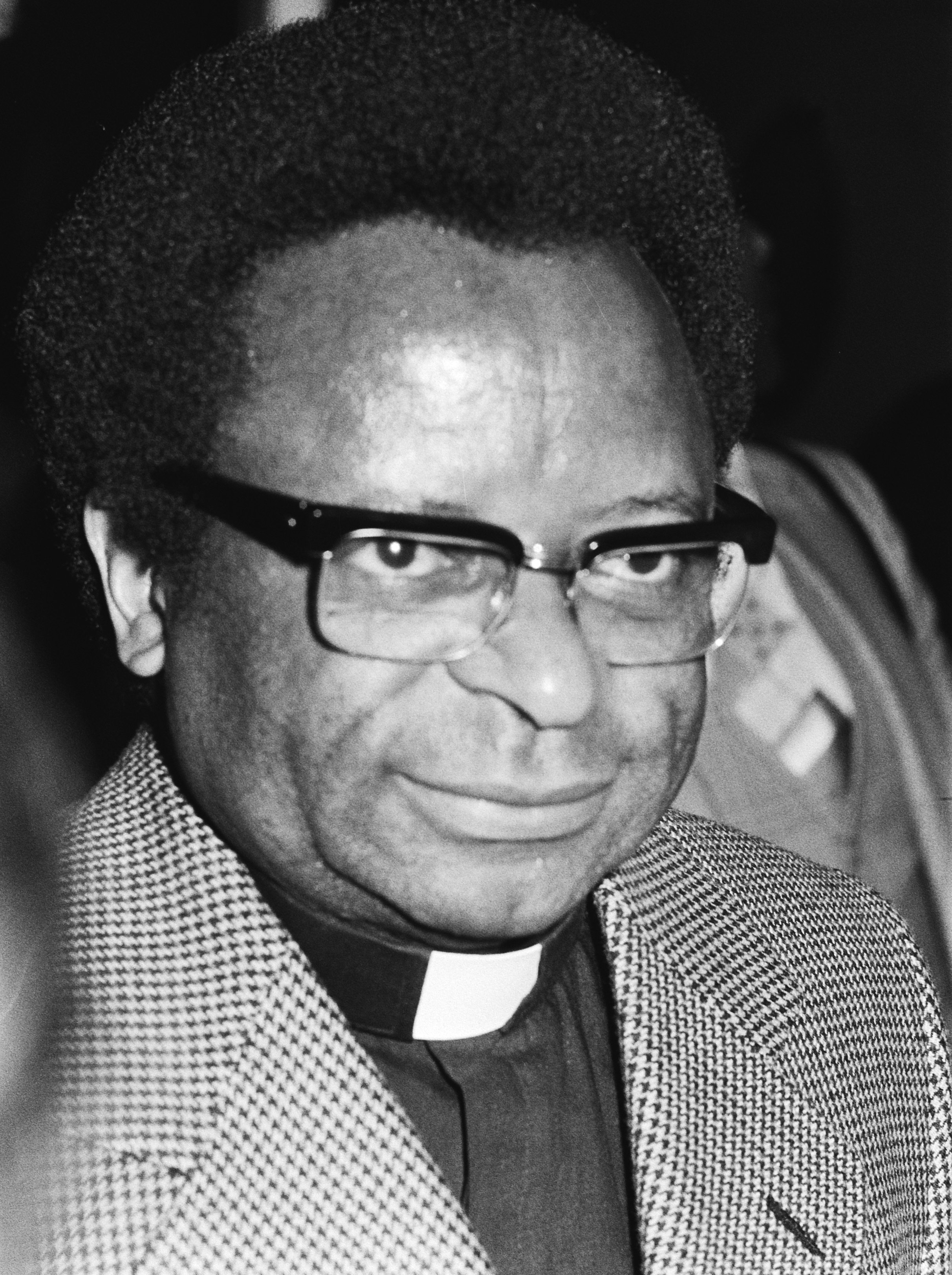
Bishop Abel Muzorewa led the nationalists at Victoria Falls, and opened the debate at Smith's invitation.

According to the terms agreed in December 1974, the talks between the Rhodesian government and the UANC were to take place within Rhodesia, but in the event the black nationalist leaders were loath to attend a conference on ground they perceived as not neutral. The Rhodesians, however, were keen to adhere to the accord and meet at a Rhodesian venue. In an effort to placate both sides, Kaunda and Vorster relaxed the terms so that the two sides would instead meet aboard a train provided by the South African government, placed halfway across the Victoria Falls Bridge, on the Rhodesian–Zambian border. The Rhodesian delegates could therefore take their seats in Rhodesia and the nationalists, on the opposite side of the carriage, would be able to attend without leaving Zambia. As part of the détente policy, Kaunda and Vorster would act as mediators in the conference, which was set for 26 August 1975.

The UANC delegation was led, as expected, by Muzorewa and included Sithole representing ZANU, Nkomo for ZAPU and James Chikerema, the former ZAPU vice-president, for a third militant party, the Front for the Liberation of Zimbabwe. According to Rhodesian intelligence, the various nationalist factions had not patched up their differences, were not prepared to accept Muzorewa as their leader and, to this end, were hoping that the conference failed to produce an agreement. The Rhodesians relayed these concerns to Pretoria, which told them firmly that the UANC would surely not risk losing the support of Kaunda and the Tanzanian President Julius Nyerere by deliberately sabotaging the peace process. When the Rhodesians persisted in their complaints, citing evidence of nationalist infighting in Lusaka, the South Africans were terser still, eventually wiring Salisbury: "If you don't like what we are offering, you always have the alternative of going it alone!"

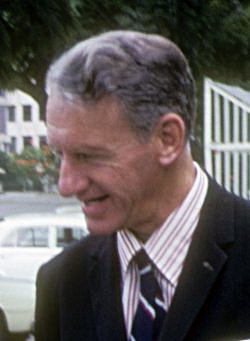
Prime Minister Ian Smith was surprised by Muzorewa's confrontational opening speech, but only antagonised the nationalists by saying so.

The conference started on the morning of 26 August as planned. The six Rhodesian delegates took their places first, then around 40 nationalists entered and crowded around Muzorewa on the opposite side of the cramped railway carriage. Vorster and Kaunda arrived and sat on the Rhodesian side, where there was more space, and each spoke in turn, giving their blessing to the negotiations. Muzorewa then opened the proceedings at Smith's invitation. Speaking assertively, the bishop gave three concessions which would have to be given by the Rhodesian side for talks to begin: first, one man, one vote was established by Muzorewa to be "a basic necessity"; second, an amnesty would have to be given for all guerrilla fighters, including those convicted of murder by the High Court in Salisbury; and finally, all of the nationalists would have to be given permission to return to Rhodesia as soon as possible to begin political campaigning. Smith replied calmly that Kaunda, Nyerere and Vorster had all assured him that the UANC had agreed not to demand preconditions for talks, and that Kaunda and Vorster had in fact confirmed this to him that same morning; his delegation was therefore surprised by Muzorewa's confrontational opening speech.

Smith says that his reply "provoked a flood of rhetoric"; the nationalists evaded his words and, one by one, gave passionate speeches about being "a suppressed people ... denied freedom in their own country" who only wanted to "return home and live normal, peaceful lives". Smith sat back and waited for them to finish, then responded that there was nothing stopping them from going home at any time and living peacefully if they so wished, and that they were in this situation by their own hand. They themselves, he said, had refused the Anglo-Rhodesian accord agreed four years previously, which he said had offered Rhodesian blacks "preferential franchise facilities", and they themselves had chosen to use "unconstitutional means and terrorism in order to overthrow the legal government of our country." The UANC delegates countered by railing against Smith even more strongly than before, repeating their previous arguments and rejecting the right of Britain to negotiate on their behalf. This argument went on for nine and a half hours before the conference broke up, Smith refusing outright to grant diplomatic immunity to the UANC's "terrorist leaders who bear responsibility for ... murders and other atrocities". Muzorewa said that he doubted Smith's sincerity in seeking a resolution if he was unwilling to grant such a "very small thing" as immunity to the nationalist leaders. The conference broke up without any agreement or progress having been made.

== Aftermath: direct talks between the government and ZAPU in Salisbury ==
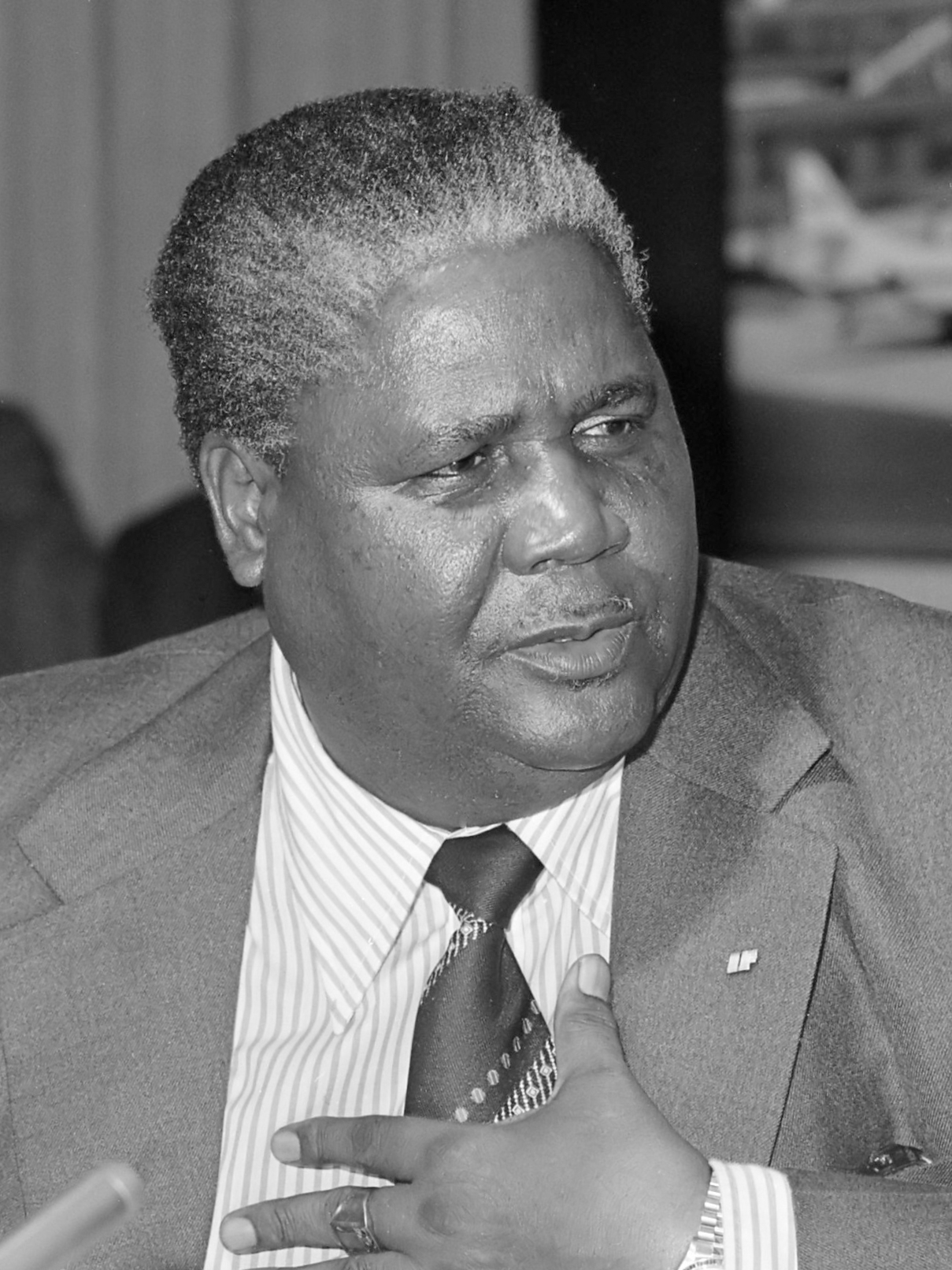
Joshua Nkomo, leader of the Zimbabwe African People's Union, in 1978

After the failure of the talks across the Falls, even the facade of a united front amongst the nationalists was broken on 11 September, when Muzorewa expelled Nkomo and four of his deputies from the council after they suggested a new leadership election be held. ZAPU contacted Salisbury soon after, stating that they wished to enter talks directly with the government. Smith "opted for the unthinkable", in the words of Eliakim Sibanda, reasoning that for all of their differences, Nkomo was still, as Sibanda writes, "a seasoned and pragmatic politician", who commanded a not insignificant force of guerrillas. The ZAPU leader was popular, too, not only locally but also regionally and internationally. If he could be brought into an internal government, and ZIPRA onto the side of the security forces, Smith thought, ZANU would find it difficult to justify continuing the guerrilla war, and even if they did so, they would be less likely to win.

Dr Elliot Gabellah, Muzorewa's deputy in the UANC, told Smith that Nkomo was "the most balanced and experienced" of the nationalist leaders, and that most Ndebele now favoured open negotiation. He said that most Ndebele would support a deal between the government and Nkomo, and that Muzorewa probably would as well. Meetings between Nkomo and Smith were duly arranged, and the first took place in secret in October 1975. After a few clandestine sessions passed without major problems, the two leaders agreed to have formal talks in the capital in December 1975.

Nkomo was wary of being labelled a "sell-out" by his ZANU rivals, particularly Mugabe, so to prevent this from happening he first consulted Kaunda, Machel and Nyerere, the presidents of the Frontline States. Each of the presidents gave his approval to ZAPU's participation in direct talks, and with their blessing Nkomo and Smith signed a declaration of intent to negotiate on 1 December 1975. Constitutional negotiations between the government and ZAPU began in Salisbury ten days later. The ZAPU delegation proposed an immediate switch to black majority rule, a government elected on a "strictly non-racial" basis, and reluctantly offered some sweeteners for the Rhodesian white population, "which we detested", Nkomo says, including some reserved seats for whites in parliament. The talks dragged on for months afterwards, with little progress being made, though Smith notes the "congenial atmosphere, with both sides ready to crack a joke". Nkomo's account of the meetings is less favourable, stressing Smith's perceived intransigence: "We went to great lengths to offer conditions that the Rhodesian régime might find acceptable, but Smith would not budge."

== Sources ==
- Binda, Alexandre (May 2008). The Saints: The Rhodesian Light Infantry. Johannesburg: 30° South Publishers. ISBN 978-1-920143-07-7.
- Cilliers, Jakkie (December 1984). Counter-Insurgency in Rhodesia. London, Sydney & Dover, New Hampshire: Croom Helm. ISBN 978-0-7099-3412-7.
- Duignan, Peter; Gann, Lewis H. (1994). Communism in Sub-Saharan Africa: a Reappraisal. Stanford, California: Hoover Press. ISBN 978-0-8179-3712-6.
- Lockley, Lt-Col R. E. H. (July 1990). "A brief operational history of the campaign in Rhodesia from 1964 to 1978". The Lion & Tusk. 2 (1). Southampton: Rhodesian Army Association. Archived from the original on 22 August 2011.
- Martin, David; Johnson, Phyllis (July 1981). The Struggle for Zimbabwe (First ed.). London: Faber and Faber. ISBN 978-0-571-11066-7.
- Moorcraft, Paul L.; McLaughlin, Peter (April 2008) [1982]. The Rhodesian War: A Military History. Barnsley: Pen and Sword Books. ISBN 978-1-84415-694-8.
- Nkomo, Joshua; Harman, Nicholas (April 1984). Nkomo: The Story of My Life (First ed.). London: Methuen Publishing. ISBN 978-0-413-54500-8.
- Okoth, Assa (2006). A History of Africa: African Nationalism and the De-Colonisation Process, 1915–1995. Volume 2 (First ed.). Nairobi, Kampala and Dar es Salaam: East African Educational Publishers. ISBN 9966-25-358-0.
- Sibanda, Eliakim M. (January 2005). The Zimbabwe African People's Union 1961–87: A Political History of Insurgency in Southern Rhodesia. Trenton, New Jersey: Africa Research & Publications. ISBN 978-1-59221-276-7.
- Smith, Ian (June 1997). The Great Betrayal: The Memoirs of Ian Douglas Smith. London: John Blake Publishing. ISBN 1-85782-176-9.
- Wood, J. R. T. (April 2008). A matter of weeks rather than months: The Impasse between Harold Wilson and Ian Smith: Sanctions, Aborted Settlements and War 1965–1969. Victoria, British Columbia: Trafford Publishing. ISBN 978-1-4251-4807-2.
