= City Youth League =

- President: James Chikerema
- Founder: James Chikerema; Dunduzu Chisiza; George Nyandoro; Edson Sithole
- Founded: August 1955
- Dissolved: 12 September 1957
- Succeeded by: Southern Rhodesia African National Congress
- Ideology: Anti-racism; Black nationalism Anti-colonialism
- Political position: Left-wing
- Continental affiliation: African National Congress

The City Youth League, later known as the African Youth League, is a defunct organization that participated in nonviolent resistance against the government in Rhodesia from its founding in August 1955 until it merged with the old SRANC on September 12, 1957, becoming the new Southern Rhodesia African National Congress.

The CYL was founded by James Chikerema, Dunduzu Chisiza, George Nyandoro, and Edson Sithole.

Chikerema served as President and Nyandoro as Vice President.

== See also ==
- African National Congress Youth League
- Rhodesian Bush War
