= 1961 Southern Rhodesian constitutional referendum =

- 26 July 1961

Results
| Choice | Votes | % |
|---|---|---|
| Yes | 42,004 | 65.79% |
| No | 21,846 | 34.21% |
| Valid votes | 63,850 | 99.13% |
| Invalid or blank votes | 558 | 0.87% |
| Total votes | 64,408 | 100.00% |
| Registered voters/turnout | 83,486 | 77.15% |

A constitutional referendum was held in Southern Rhodesia, then a constituent territory of the Federation of Rhodesia and Nyasaland, on 26 July 1961. The new constitution was approved by about 66% of those who voted; turnout was 77%.

The referendum was held using the same franchise as elections to the Legislative Assembly, which excluded most Africans.

== Background ==
Following three years of negotiations with the Southern Rhodesian government and other parties, the British government put forward a draft constitution on 13 June 1961. It provided for a parliamentary system, with a 65-seat parliament; the previously common voters' roll was divided into two rolls, the "A" roll and the "B" roll, the latter of which had lower qualifications intended to make it easier for prospective voters to enter the political system. There were 50 "A"-roll constituencies and 15 larger "B"-roll districts, with a complicated mechanism of "cross-voting" allowing "B"-roll voters to slightly influence "A"-roll elections and vice versa. This system was theoretically non-racial, but in practice the "A" roll was largely white and the "B" roll was almost all black.

== Results ==
| Choice | Votes | % |
|---|---|---|
| For | 42,004 | 65.79 |
| Against | 21,846 | 34.21 |
| Invalid/blank votes | 558 | – |
| Total | 64,408 | 100 |
| Registered voters/turnout | 83,486 | 77.15 |
Source: Willson

== Unofficial National Democratic Party referendum ==
In protest against the official referendum, the black nationalist National Democratic Party (NDP) ran its own poll, professedly based on "one man, one vote", on 23 July. This was peacefully operated, but reportedly amateur and potentially biased in its execution, garnering criticism from British officials, rival nationalists and other observers amidst its virtually unanimous rejection of the constitution. The British High Commission commented that voters in the NDP referendum appeared to be subject to intimidation by the NDP officials running the exercise, and that the votes did not seem to be secret. The rival Zimbabwe National Party called the NDP poll "phoney" and said it was designed "to hoodwink the African people". There were many cases of people posting multiple ballots: two whites told the press they had voted twice and one black man proudly announced that he had voted 11 times. After the government released the results of the official referendum, the NDP announced that their poll had garnered 467,189 votes against the constitution, and only 584 in favour—a reported majority of about 99.9% against. According to historian J. R. T. Wood, the NDP referendum "smacked of farce"; he highlights the fact that the general strike of black workers called by the NDP for the next day was adhered to by less than 10% of the black workforce.

=== Results ===
| Choice | Votes | % |
|---|---|---|
| For | 584 | 0.12 |
| Against | 467,189 | 99.88 |
| Total | 467,773 | 100 |
Source: Wood
