= Racism in Zimbabwe =

Racism in Zimbabwe was introduced during the colonial era in the 19th century, when emigrating white settlers began racially discriminating against and segregating the indigenous Africans living in the region. The colony of Southern Rhodesia and state of Rhodesia were both dominated by a white minority, which imposed racist policies in all spheres of public life. In the 1960s–70s, native African national liberation groups waged an armed struggle against the white Rhodesian government, culminating in a peace accord that brought the ZANU–PF to power but which left much of the white settler population's economic authority intact.

Violent government repression following independence included massacres against native African ethnic groups, embittering ethnic divides within the population. The government led by Robert Mugabe during the 1980s was benevolent to white settlers while violently repressing illegal incursions on white land by native African peasants who were frustrated with the slow pace of land reform. Mugabe's government would change policies in 2000 and encourage violence against white Zimbabweans, with many fleeing the country by 2005. After assuming the presidency in 2017, Emmerson Mnangagwa pledged to compensate white farmers for property seized from them under the land reform programme and declared that thinking along racial lines in farming and land ownership was outdated.

== History ==
=== Racism in colonial Zimbabwe (pre–1965) ===
Racism in Zimbabwe has a history going back to the era of British colonialism in the region which began in the late nineteenth century and lasted until the Unilateral Declaration of Independence in 1965. The belief in the civilising mission was at the core of the justification for colonisation. White settlers believed that Europeans were more developed than Africans, who they believed were of low morality and incapable of controlling themselves. This racist ideology was the basis for a series of discriminatory legislation such as the Sale of Liquor to Natives and Indians Regulations, 1898 which prohibited the sale of alcohol to indigenous peoples in Southern Rhodesia, as well as the Immorality and Indecency Suppression Act 1903 which criminalised sexual acts between white women and black men. The dispossession of land from indigenous peoples began in the late nineteenth century as land was rewarded to European settlers in exchange for occupying the area that would become Southern Rhodesia. Many white settlers would turn to agriculture and found themselves competing with the indigenous farmers who provided for the growing settler population. In response the colonial government targeted black agricultural producers through land alienation and forced resettlement to reserves. These reserves were intentionally set up in areas unsuitable for agriculture in order to ensure minimal competition to white farmers. By 1914, indigenous Africans accounted for 97% of the Southern Rhodesian population yet they were restricted to only 23% of the land. Racial discrimination in matters of land continued with the Land Apportionment Act 1930 which proclaimed that the majority black population could only legally reside in Tribal Trust Lands, which made up 29.8% of the country, and Native Purchase Areas. This confinement meant indigenous agriculture began to put ecological strain on the natural environment which led to further restrictions and impediments on indigenous farmers. Politically, indigenous Africans were excluded on every level. The Prime Minister of Southern Rhodesia Godfrey Huggins was in absolute opposition to blacks serving in a governmental position at any level and the Public Services Act of 1921 prohibited indigenous peoples from employment in the civil service. Black Africans were also largely disenfranchised through a series of qualifications. The 1923 Constitution enforced income and property restrictions that were unattainable for the majority of blacks. While race was not an explicit factor in enfranchisement, such prerequisites were used to intentionally prevent black Africans from attaining voting rights. The labour force was also an area of prominent racial prejudice as the Southern Rhodesian state sought to control black labour. Legislation allowed white employers unquestioned control over their indigenous employees. White workers were resistant to black opposition and pressure from white trade unions led to policies enforcing that blacks could not be employed in positions above a certain skill level. The Industrial Conciliation Act of 1934 also excluded blacks from participating in trade unions.

=== Racism in Rhodesia (1965–1980) ===
Racial division would continue under Rhodesian governance, sparking an armed struggle to overthrow white rule led by the Zimbabwe African People's Union (ZAPU) and the Zimbabwe African National Union (ZANU). This conflict culminated in the establishment of the modern state of Zimbabwe. The coalition of black African forces was fragile, and the government led by Robert Mugabe and the majority-Shona ZANU committed massacres against Northern Ndebele people in ZAPU strongholds, producing resentment between the black ethnic groups.

Because of the large number of white settlers in Rhodesia following the Unilateral Declaration of Independence, the government continued to function similarly to the colonial period. In 1965, there were estimated 224,000 whites living in Rhodesia, predominantly settled in urban areas. According to David Kenrick, there was little sense of Rhodesian nationalism in the white Rhodesian community, and many of the white settlers did not stay for long—with many leaving for South Africa. The Rhodesian Front government sought to maintain control by preventing too large of a “racial imbalance” by encouraging white immigration to Rhodesia and preventing the black population from growing with birth control.

==== Discrimination in the military ====
The military of Rhodesia was also heavily influenced by racial hierarchy, non-white soldiers were allowed in the Rhodesian army but they were subjected to stricter entry standards and were rarely able to rise to higher ranks. The army was heavily segregated and only some units including both black and white soldiers formed in the 1970s. Units made up of non white soldiers were subjected to close supervision by white leaders and it was believed that this would properly discipline them. Importantly these integrated units did not include “Coloured” soldiers, this was done to prevent Coloured and black soldiers from uniting against the white leaders. Coloured and Asian men in the army were not able to carry weapons or take combat roles until the late 1970s and before this they were only given minimal training and menial jobs.

==== Discrimination in sports ====
Sports in Rhodesia became increasingly segregated after the UDI and the sanctions that followed prevented competition with most of the international community. The exception to this was the highly segregated sporting scene of South Africa. Unlike in South Africa however sport was not segregated by law but instead by private clubs that were concerned with maintaining a white identity. The sanctions imposed by the international community had a more significant effect on black athletes than white because most white athletes had some form of dual citizenship that would allow them to travel with a non Rhodesia passport and black athletes did not. Despite international sanctions put in place after the 1965 UDI Rhodesia was included in the qualifying rounds of the 1970 World Cup but shortly afterwards its membership was removed in part due to racial discrimination as well as the complicated political situation it was in.

=== Racism in Zimbabwe (post–1980) ===
Following the end of armed conflict, the white minority in Zimbabwe continued to exert disproportionate control over the economy, owned the majority of arable land in Zimbabwe, and maintained racially segregated social circles. White settlers were protected by generous provisions established by the Lancaster House Agreement, and thus continued to exert significant political and legal control over the black population. Wide disparities existed in access to sports, education and housing. The ZANU-led government did not engage in significant expropriation of white settlers despite promising land reform to the black population, with one white commercial farmer commenting that Mugabe's government in the early 1980s was "the best government for farmers that this country has ever seen". Dissatisfaction with the slow pace of land reform led to the illegal seizing of white-owned land by black peasants. The government responded with heavy-handed repression against the black peasants. Resentment of continued white control of the economy continued through the 1990s, spurred by the perception that the white business community was disinterested in improving the economic lot of the black population or otherwise changing the status quo.

By 2000, as ZANU grew politically isolated, it increasingly criticized the white population's segregationism and racism, and began to encourage violent farm invasions against the white population, which drew condemnations from the international community. A dozen white farmers and scores of their black employees were killed in the ensuing violence, with hundreds injured and thousands fleeing the country.

On 18 September 2010, droves of white people were chased away and prevented from participating in the constitutional outreach program in Harare during a weekend, in which violence and confusion marred the process, with similar incidents having occurred in Graniteside. In Mount Pleasant, white families were subjected to a torrent of abuse by suspected Zanu-PF supporters, who later drove them away and shouted racial slurs.

However, at this stage, land acquisition could only occur on a voluntary basis. Little land had been redistributed, and frustrated groups of government supporters began seizing white-owned farms. Most of the seizures took place in Nyamandhalovu and Inyati.

After the beating to death of a prominent farmer in September 2011, the head of the Commercial Farmers' Union decried the attack, saying that its white members continue to be targeted for violence, without protection from the government.

In September 2014, Mugabe publicly declared that all white Zimbabweans should "go back to England", and he urged black Zimbabweans not to lease agricultural land to white farmers.

In 2017, new President Emmerson Mnangagwa's inaugural speech promised to pay compensation to the white farmers whose land was seized during the land reform programme. Rob Smart became the first white farmer whose land was returned after President Mnangagwa was sworn in to office; he returned to his farm in Manicaland province by military escort. During the World Economic Forum 2018 in Davos, Mnangagwa also stated that his new government believes thinking about racial lines in farming and land ownership is "outdated", and should be a "philosophy of the past."

== See also ==
- Human rights in Zimbabwe
- Politics of Zimbabwe
- Rhodesia
- Southern Rhodesia
