= Front for the Liberation of Zimbabwe =

The Front for the Liberation of Zimbabwe (FROLIZI) was an African nationalist organisation established in opposition to the white minority government of Rhodesia. It was announced in Lusaka, Zambia in October 1971 as a merger of the two principal African nationalist factions in Rhodesia, the Zimbabwe African People's Union (ZAPU) and the Zimbabwe African National Union (ZANU). However, it was in fact a breakaway faction of both ZAPU and ZANU, established by members of both groups who had become disaffected due to their rival organisations' incessant internal and external disputes. Its domination by members of the Zezuru, a subgroup of the Shona people, led to accusations that it was merely a tribal grouping and ridicule as the "Front for the Liaison of Zezuru Intellectuals".

The organisation declared its support for national unity in its draft constitution and excoriated the divisions of ZANU and ZAPU, which had undermined their effectiveness in combating the Rhodesian regime. As the constitution said,

The need for a progressive revolutionary movement, uniting not only ZAPU and ZANU but the massess of the people and all the revolutionary forces of Zimbabwe behind a single banner ... The formation today of FROLIZI puts an end to this sordid and self-destructive state of affairs. The struggle will from now on be waged against the enemy and oppressor, not the Zimbabwean people.

FROLIZI's first leaders were Skilkom Siwela and Godfrey Savanhu; there were reportedly plans to appoint Robert Mugabe of ZANU as a supposed "unity" leader, but this did not happen due to the failure of a plot which had been intended to bring it about. FROLIZI's leadership circulated a letter falsely claiming that ZAPU's leader Joshua Nkomo and ZANU's leader Ndabaningi Sithole had agreed to support Mugabe as the leader of FROLIZI, which would bring together both ZANU and ZAPU. However, Sithole learned of the plot and circulated a letter denouncing FROLIZI, and ZAPU's Deputy National Secretary dismissed FROLIZI as "a haven of refuge for political rejects". Mugabe remained in ZANU and eventually managed to seize control of the organisation in 1975.

Siwela and Savanhu were ousted in 1972 by James Chikerema, George Nyandoro and Nathan Shamuyarira. While FROLIZI did not manage to establish a presence in Rhodesia, it sought to ally with African National Council. It had very few members and no significant armed grouping of its own, though armed members were reported to have infiltrated across the Zambian border in the northern Karoi region of Rhodesia and carried out an attack on a white-owned farm in 1972. It obtained significant outside support for a while but collapsed in 1973 after being passed over by the Organisation of African Unity's Liberation Committee in favour of the other two principal Zimbabwean liberation movements. Its members mostly went over to ZANU following FROLIZI's demise.
