= George Nyandoro =

Zimbabwean politician and activist

George Bodzo Nyandoro (8 July 1926 – 24 June 1994) was a Zimbabwean politician and activist in the struggle to end white minority rule in Rhodesia. Nyandoro was one of the founders of the Southern Rhodesia African National Congress (SRANC) and served as the General Secretary of the Zimbabwe African People's Union.

As a founder member of the earliest nationalist parties, his struggle against colonial domination dates back to the 1950s.

An ethnic Shona, Nyandoro was born in 1926 in the Chihota Reserve and came from a background which made resistance to political domination by whites a family tradition.

He developed a keen interest in public affairs at an early age by joining the British African National Voice Association and later the Inter-Racial Association. Although George Nyandoro had received no former education past Standard VI.

Driven by an insatiable thirst to fight for freedom from colonial domination, Nyandoro joined James Chikerema, Edison Sithole and others in founding the African National Youth League (ANYL) in 1955. In effect, the organization became the first step in the creation of a full-scale nationalist movement in Rhodesia. ANYL participated in a bus boycott as a way to protest white supremacists at that time.

By 1956 he refused a well-paid job as a bookkeeper with an airline company to pursue politics on a full-time basis. When the ANYL fused with the old SRANC to form a broad national movement, also called the African National Congress, Nyandoro was elected its Secretary-General in recognition of his value both as a thinker and a man of action. SRANC wanted to achieve a level of equality amongst the races and influenced the government into doing so. They grew into a more radical group as the government began to refuse any groups working against them.

In December 1958 he attended the first All-African Peoples' Conference in Accra, Ghana.

On 25 January 1959 he was present at the famous forest meeting in Limbe, generally regarded as the precursor of the troubles that broke out shortly afterwards in Nyasaland (now Malawi).

Two weeks later, on 10 February, Nyandoro was sentenced to four months hard labour in Marondera for a contravention of the Public Order Act arising out of a meeting which he had addressed at Chumachanga on 4 January.

On 26 February, a state of emergency was declared and hundreds of active members of the ANC and their leaders (including George Nyandoro) were detained.

He was eventually released in early 1963 due to a diagnosis of tuberculosis. Addressing the United Nations Committee of 24 in Lisbon in June 1975, he said that African nationalists were preparing for an armed struggle in Rhodesia, while at the same time exploring the possibilities of peaceful change.

He accused Ian Smith of playing for time and of not being serious. After independence, he retired from active politics and became a successful businessman, amongst which he chaired the board of ART Corporation a position which he held until his death.

Nyandoro died on June 24, 1994, in Harare at the age of 67 and is interred at the National Heroes' Acre in Harare.

During the liberation struggle our main objective is to seize power - then we can begin the social revolution, begin to put our social principles into practice. When we liberate an area, then we will begin our social revolution from that base - in practical terms. Until that time, until we have power in a liberated area, considerations of socialist programs and policies are necessarily confined to the realm of pure theory.
