= James Chikerema =

President of the Front for the Liberation of Zimbabwe (1925–2006)

James Robert Dambaza Chikerema (2 April 1925 – 22 March 2006) served as the President of the Front for the Liberation of Zimbabwe. He changed his views on militant struggle in the late 1970s and supported the 'internal settlement', serving in the attempted power-sharing governments.

== Early life ==
Chikerema was born at Kutama Mission in Zvimba, in present-day Mashonaland West province; Robert Mugabe, who was his nephew, shared the same birthplace and the two were very close during childhood. He was educated at St. Francis Xavier College in Kutama, and in South Africa. He became President of the Southern Rhodesia National Youth League and in 1956 led a bus boycott by Africans to protest at their lack of political power (the electoral system in Rhodesia made it very difficult for Africans to be eligible).

With Didymus Mutasa, George Nyandoro, Guy Clutton-Brock, Michael and Eileen Haddon, white liberals who donated their land, he helped create Cold Comfort Farm to improve African farming methods and then form the African National Congress. The ANC campaigned for an extension of the franchise, but was banned within two years of its birth.

== Ally of Nkomo ==
Together with Joshua Nkomo, Chikerema formed the Southern Rhodesia African National Congress in 1957 to press for meaningful reform. Although not a violent movement, the Southern Rhodesia government banned the group in 1960, and restricted its leading members to the Gokwe area. Chikerema remained with Nkomo when he established the National Democratic Party soon after; when this was also banned, Nkomo and Chikerema launched the Zimbabwe African Peoples Union (ZAPU). When the government banned this group, it remained in existence as a clandestine organisation. The movement restrictions on Nkomo and Chikerema were removed by the incoming government of Winston Field in early 1963.

On 9 February 1963 Nkomo and Chikerema together with Maurice Nyagumbo and Daniel Madzimbamuto were arrested while eating supper at Nkomo's house in Rusape under the Law and Order Maintenance Act 1960, and charged with taking part in an illegal procession and hindering the police. Herbert Chitepo was their defence counsel at trial, but could not prevent them being convicted. Chikerema was sentenced to six months' imprisonment (three months of which were suspended). Their convictions were overturned on appeal.

== Exiled leader of ZAPU ==
During Nkomo's detention, Chikerema went into exile first in Zambia where he was acting President of ZAPU. He argued for a referendum of all adults of Southern Rhodesia on whether it should have independence, and opposed the government's use of the House of Chiefs as a means of consulting African opinion. When Ian Smith's government increasingly threatened a unilateral declaration of independence, Chikerema declared the willingness of ZAPU to take up armed struggle, promising "a campaign of terror" in which "at first we will attack white farms in isolated areas, and with the arms we capture there, we will attack white homes in the towns". Following UDI, Chikerema took charge of ZAPU's guerrilla war.

== FROLIZI ==
In 1971 ZAPU split, with Chikerema joining instead the Front for the Liberation of Zimbabwe (FROLIZI). After the collapse of talks in Lusaka in December 1974, Chikerema on behalf of FROLIZI signed an agreement with Nkomo of ZAPU and Rev. Ndabaningi Sithole of the Zimbabwe African National Union (ZANU) to unite with the African National Council of Rev. Abel Muzorewa.

Unlike the other leaders, Chikerema remained in exile fearing arrest and imprisonment or execution should he return to Rhodesia. Because of this, when the Rhodesian government agreed to talks in 1975, the venue chosen was a railway carriage on the bridge over the Victoria Falls: the carriage was placed in the middle of the bridge so that the ANC delegation was in Zambia while the Rhodesians were still in Rhodesia.

Shortly after the talks the accord within the ANC fell apart with Chikerema siding with Sithole and Muzorewa against Nkomo and Robert Mugabe. In February 1976 Chikerema issued a press statement that the armed struggle was likely to resume, saying that the United Kingdom abdicated responsibility by failing to send troops against the Rhodesian government after UDI, and that any troops then sent to Rhodesia would be fought by the ANC.

== Alliance with Muzorewa ==
Increasingly, Chikerema grew politically close to Muzorewa. He became the first vice-president of the United African National Council which Muzorewa had founded, and was allowed to return to Rhodesia in September 1977. At a meeting the next month he caused uproar among the white audience by arguing that there were no terrorists in Rhodesia, merely freedom fighters. He became highly critical of the Patriotic Front formed by Mugabe's ZANU and Nkomo's ZAPU, and accused the United Kingdom of supporting ZAPU.

Chikerema participated in the internal settlement talks of 1978 and supported the proposal of reserving 28 seats for white voters in a majority-rule Parliament. In his memoirs, Ian Smith remarks that he was "a constant source of help in bringing things back to sanity". When agreement was reached he said that guerrillas who continued fighting after the multi-racial election would be "severely dealt with".

During the transitional government, he was made co-Minister for Transport and Power, a surprisingly lowly post given his stature; the apparent snub was explained by the fact that he lacked professional training in any of the areas of government. In July 1978 the Department of Information called a press conference at which a man appeared claiming to have been sent by ZIPRA (ZAPU's military wing) to assassinate four of the co-Ministers, including Chikerema.

== Media ==
James Chikerema together with Raymond Chinamora were the editors of a weekly liberation struggle newspaper called The Rise of Zimbabwe.

== Later life ==
On 29 June 1979 after Abel Muzorewa took over as prime minister, Chikerema led a group of seven members of the House of Assembly to split with him due to concerns about his lack of firmness. They formed the Zimbabwe Democratic Party, having to fight through the courts for their right to keep their seats. Following the Lancaster House Agreement, the Zimbabwe Democratic Party stood in the 1980 elections. Chikerema complained about intimidation by ZANU-PF supporters during the campaign, and was distraught when his party failed to win any seats.

That marked the end of Chikerema's active political career, but he continued to comment through newspaper interviews on the political situation in Zimbabwe. He attained the status of 'elder statesman' and while he was not necessarily in line with the majority view, he was listened to with considerable respect based on his previous campaigns. In 1993, he joined the Forum Party of Zimbabwe, (whose founder was ex-Chief Justice Enoch Dumbutshena) re-entering the political arena; the Forum Party's 25 candidates in the 1995 elections failed to make an impact.

The farm he owned was designated for purchase by the Zimbabwe government soon after he formed the party, and in 2000 it was included in the list of farms to be compulsorily purchased without compensation. Chikerema remarked "As far as I'm concerned, it's Mugabe's vendetta against me". Chikerema made it clear that he supported orderly land redistribution if it was conducted fairly.

Chikerema died in the United States, where he had gone for medical treatment.
