= National Democratic Party (Southern Rhodesia) =

- Abbreviation: NDP
- Founder: Joshua Nkomo
- Founded: 1 January 1960
- Dissolved: 9 December 1961
- Preceded by: Southern Rhodesia African National Congress
- Succeeded by: Zimbabwe African People's Union
- Ideology: Black nationalism Anti-colonialism; Pan-africanism; Socialism
- Political position: Left-wing

The National Democratic Party (NDP) was a socialist African nationalist political party in Southern Rhodesia that was active from 1 January 1960 to 9 December 1961. The party was founded by Joshua Nkomo with the objective of achieving greater rights for the African majority of the country, but it was banned by the white minority government just a year into its existence. Ten days after the NDP was banned, Nkomo founded the Zimbabwe African People's Union.

== History ==
On 1 January 1960, the National Democratic Party replaced the Southern Rhodesia African National Congress (SRANC), Chikerema and Nyandoro became members while still detained, and Nkomo came on as president on 28 November 1960. The NDP was an ideologically identical organisation to SRANC, although rural organising was nearly impossible after the Native Affairs Amendment Act.
