= Edson Sithole =

Rhodesian lawyer

Edson Furatidzayi Chisingaitwi Sithole (born 5 June 1935; disappeared 15 October 1975) was the second black African to be admitted to the Rhodesian Bar in 1963 after Herbert Chitepo. He received his LLB from the University of London through correspondence. Subsequently, he was the first black person in the entire southern and central African region to obtain a Doctor of Laws (LLD) degree from the University of South Africa (UNISA) in 1974. In October 1975 he was kidnapped together with his secretary, Miriam Mhlanga, by suspected agents of the Rhodesian Special Branch.

In December 1975, Rhodesian politician William Harper publicly stated that Sithole had been abducted by the Rhodesian Special Branch. Harper released the information he had available about Sithole's abduction in what became known as the "Harper Memorandum", which stated that both Sithole and Mhlanga were initially taken to Goromonzi prison, but then shuttled between various other detention sites throughout the country.

Bibliography

Edson Sithole, Law, Liberation and the Cost of Dissent (HSRC Press, 2026).

Dr. Edson Furatidzayi Chisingaitwi Sithole

Dr. Edson Furatidzayi Chisingaitwi Sithole (5 June 1935 – disappeared 15 October 1975) was a pioneering Zimbabwean nationalist, jurist, author, and liberation activist. He was one of the most prominent pan-African intellectuals of the struggle against white minority rule in Rhodesia.

As a high-ranking executive member of the Zimbabwe African National Union (ZANU), Sithole became a key architect of the movement's legal, intellectual, and media strategies. While many nationalist leaders operated from exile, Sithole chose to remain active inside Rhodesia for much of his political career, using his legal practice to challenge colonial legislation and defend political detainees.

His forced disappearance by colonial security agents in 1975 remains one of Zimbabwe's most enduring political mysteries. Following the country's independence in 1980, the Government of Zimbabwe declared him a National Hero.

Early Life and Education

Edson Furatidzayi Chisingaitwi Sithole was born on 5 June 1935 in the Eastern Districts of Southern Rhodesia to peasant farmers. Growing up under a system of rigid racial segregation, he faced immense structural barriers; his childhood home was 48 kilometres away from the nearest school. In 1943, his family relocated to Bikita, allowing him to begin his formal primary education. To pay for his schooling, a young Sithole worked on an agricultural estate in the mornings, earning a mere 75 cents a month, and attended classes in the afternoons. He eventually completed his standard four education at Chikore Mission.

Sithole possessed an extraordinary intellectual drive, completing the majority of his higher education while held as a political prisoner. First detained in 1959 at the age of 22, he used his time in restriction to study via correspondence with the University of London, successfully earning his Bachelor of Laws (LL.B.) and subsequent Master of Laws (LL.M.). In 1963, he became the second Black African to be admitted to the Rhodesian Bar, following Herbert Chitepo.

During a subsequent stint of political imprisonment, he continued his academic pursuits through the University of South Africa (UNISA). In 1974, at the age of 39, he obtained his Doctor of Laws (LL.D.) degree, making him the first Black person in the entire Southern and Central African region to earn a doctorate in law.

Legal Career and ZANU Ideology

Sithole established a vital legal practice from his office on Kingsway in Salisbury (now Harare). He was in high demand across the colony, robustly defending Africans charged with political offences under discriminatory colonial statutes. He specialized in challenging the Rhodesian emergency regulations and detention orders used by Ian Smith’s administration to suppress dissent.

Role in ZANU

When the Zimbabwe African National Union (ZANU) was formed in 1963, Sithole aligned himself closely with the movement. In 1964, he was appointed Publicity Secretary of ZANU. In this capacity, he served as the party’s chief spokesperson during a critical juncture of the struggle, specifically when the white minority government unilaterally declared independence (UDI) from Britain in November 1965.

Sithole believed that military resistance had to be reinforced by an intellectual warfare of ideas. His writings and public statements formed the backbone of ZANU's domestic publicity campaign, articulating to the public and the international community why minority rule was legally illegitimate and morally indefensible.

Rise in the African National Council (ANC)

By the early 1970s, as the liberation war intensified, various nationalist factions sought to present a unified front to negotiate with the British and Rhodesian governments. In December 1971, Sithole co-founded the African National Council (ANC) under Bishop Abel Muzorewa.

Sithole was appointed Publicity Secretary and later Chairman of the Editorial Committee for the ANC. Despite the diverse political factions present within the coalition, Sithole remained a staunch ZANU loyalist, ensuring that ZANU’s uncompromising revolutionary principles and stance against colonial appeasement heavily influenced the ANC's agenda from within.

Operating openly inside the country under intense state surveillance, he became the public voice of the nationalist cause. He regularly briefed international journalists, published political tracts, and exposed human rights abuses perpetrated by the Rhodesian security forces. His successful campaign mobilizing Black Rhodesians to reject the proposed Anglo-Rhodesian settlement proposals forced the British government to abandon its efforts to legitimize the settler state. His political cunning and high visibility made him a primary target for the Rhodesian Central Intelligence Organisation (CIO).

Disappearance

On the afternoon of 15 October 1975, Dr. Sithole held a press conference accusing the settler state of political favoritism. Later that evening, he made the short drive in his blue BMW to the Ambassador Hotel in downtown Salisbury to meet colleagues at the Quill Club.

At approximately 7:00 PM, as he exited the hotel, Dr. Sithole and his personal secretary, Miriam Mhlanga, were intercepted by plainclothes security agents. Witnesses observed them being forced into a grey Mazda van, a vehicle type explicitly associated with Rhodesia's Special Branch. International media later identified the white officers leading the abduction as Detective Inspector Winston Hart and Detective Section Officer George Mitchell.

Despite international outcries, the Rhodesian government denied holding him. However, in December 1975, former Rhodesian politician William Harper released the "Harper Memorandum," which exposed that the Special Branch had indeed abducted Sithole and Mhlanga, holding them initially at Goromonzi Prison before shuttling them between various secret detention sites to avoid detection. Neither Dr. Sithole nor Miriam Mhlanga was ever seen again, and it is widely concluded they were extrajudicially executed by the colonial state.

Personal Life and Family Legacy

Dr. Sithole's hazardous career as a freedom fighter heavily impacted his private life; he frequently noted to colleagues that the constant threat of imprisonment made it difficult to maintain a traditional family structure. Despite these immense strains, he was a dedicated family man, leaving behind his wife and three children, including his only son, Eddison Sithole (often referred to as Edson Sithole Jnr), who was proudly named after his father.

Following his disappearance in 1975, his wife and children bore the immense emotional weight of his sudden absence while navigating harassment from the colonial regime. His family remained resolute in keeping his memory alive. His mother passed away in February 2015.

His only son, Edson Sithole Jnr, went on to serve Zimbabwe internationally as a high-ranking diplomat. He notably served his country as the Deputy Head of Mission and Head of Chancery at the Zimbabwean Embassy in Accra, Ghana, from 2017 to 2022, before returning to the Ministry of Foreign Affairs head office in Harare. Edson Sithole Jnr and his wife have built their own family, raising three children. Reflecting the family's deep roots and diplomatic journey on the continent, their youngest child, a daughter, was born in Ghana during his diplomatic posting in Accra. Edson Sithole Jnr and his family continue to actively advocate for his father’s pan-African vision of a united and prosperous continent.

Honors

Following Zimbabwe's independence in 1980, the new government formally recognized Dr. Sithole's ultimate sacrifice:

- He was officially declared a National Hero.
- In 1999, a cenotaph monument and an empty symbolic grave were installed at the National Heroes Acre in Harare.
- His intellectual legacy is frequently celebrated, with institutions like UNISA posthumously honoring his status as a trailblazer for African legal scholarship.
