= Zimbabwe African People's Union =

Socialist political party

- Abbreviation: ZAPU
- Leader: Michael Nkomo
- Founder: Joshua Nkomo
- Founded: 17 December 1961 (64 years, 287 days) (historic) 13 December 2008 (17 years, 291 days) (current)
- Dissolved: 1987; 39 years ago (as the Patriotic Front)
- Preceded by: National Democratic Party
- Headquarters: Bulawayo
- Armed wing: ZIPRA (1964–1980)
- Ideology: Communism; Marxism-Leninism; African nationalism Georgism (as the Patriotic Front)
- Political position: Far-left
- National affiliation: Patriotic Front
- House of Assembly: 0 / 280
- Senate: 0 / 80
- Pan African Parliament: 0 / 5

Party flag

The Zimbabwe African People's Union (ZAPU), known from 1980 to 1987 as the Patriotic Front (PF), is a Zimbabwean political party. It is a militant Marxist-Leninist organisation and political party that campaigned for majority rule in Rhodesia, from its founding in 1961 until 1980. In 1987, the PF merged into the Zimbabwe African National Union-Patriotic Front (ZANU – PF).

The party was formed on 17 December 1961, 10 days after the Rhodesian government banned the National Democratic Party (NDP). It was founded by Joshua Nkomo as president, Samuel Parirenyatwa as vice-president, Ndabaningi Sithole as chairman, Jason Moyo as treasurer, Robert Mugabe as information and publicity secretary, and Leopold Takawira as external secretary. ZAPU was banned in 1962 by the Rhodesian white minority government, and later engaged in a guerrilla war against it. The armed wing of ZAPU, known as the Zimbabwe People's Revolutionary Army (ZIPRA), was founded by Moyo and commanded by General Lookout Masuku.

ZAPU was separate from ZANU as its armed wing, ZIPRA, was aligned with the Soviet Union, which prioritised mobilising urban workers, whereas ZANU had a pro-People's Republic of China orientation, which prioritised mobilising the rural peasantry.

It was relaunched in 2008 by Joshua Nkomo's son, Michael Nkomo.

== Unification into ZANU-PF ==
In 1980, ZAPU contested elections in Zimbabwe as the Patriotic Front, but lost to its rival ZANU. They merged into ZANU–PF in 1987 following the Gukurahundi massacres.

=== Unity Accord ===
The Unity Accord signed at that meeting stated that:

- ZANU and ZAPU have irrevocably committed themselves to unite under one political party.
- The unity of the two political parties; shall be achieved under the name Zimbabwe African National Union (Patriotic Front) in short ZANU – PF.
- Comrade Robert Gabriel Mugabe shall be the First Secretary and President of ZANU PF.
- ZANU PF shall have two Second Secretaries and vice-presidents, who shall be appointed by the First Secretary and President of the Party.
- ZANU PF shall seek to establish a socialist society in Zimbabwe on the guidance of Marxist–Leninist principles.
- ZANU PF shall seek to establish a One Party State in Zimbabwe.
- The leadership of ZANU – PF shall abide by the Leadership Code.
- The existing structures of ZANU – PF and PF ZAPU shall be merged in accordance with the letter and spirit of this Agreement.
- Both parties shall take immediate vigorous steps to eliminate and end the insecurity and violence prevalent in Matabeleland.
- ZANU – PF and PF ZAPU shall convene their respective Congress to give effect to this Agreement within the shortest possible time.
- In the interim Mugabe is vested with full powers to prepare for the implementation of this Agreement and to act in the name and authority of ZANU – PF.

== 2008 withdrawal from Unity Accord ==
Under the influence of Benny Ncube and Dumiso Dabengwa in mid-October 2008, in the midst of ongoing negotiations with rival parties, a group of former PF ZAPU and Zipra members loudly pushed to dissolve the alliance with ZANU – PF. The members convened a meeting on 8 November, and it was decided that:

- The political structure of ZAPU would cease to operate under the title ZANU – PF and to reassume the title ZAPU.
- All party structures would operate under the Constitution of ZAPU.
- The District Councils to meet to prepare for and convene a Consultative Conference consisting of the ten Provinces by December 2008, for the purpose of electing an Interim Executive charged with the responsibility to mobilise and restructure the party and convene the party Congress by March 2009, in terms of ZAPU constitution Article 6.
- A campaign to mobilise resources in the country to be undertaken forthwith, with support from well-wishers, from fraternal political parties and International Organisations.
- Engaging as necessary in the negotiations and peace-building initiatives to ameliorate the political and economic hardships afflicting the people of Zimbabwe.
- A consultative Conference consisting of all ten political Provinces by December 2008 will elect an Interim Executive, charged to mobilise and restructure the party and convene the Party's Congress by March 2009, in terms of Article 6.

=== Withdrawal of 16 Znlwva members ===
Ex-ZIPRA cadres officially withdrew their membership from the Zimbabwe National Liberation War Veterans Association, which was under the administration of ZANU PF. They revived ZIPRA, led by Benny Ncube as chairperson, Tapson Moyo as vice chairperson, Petros Sibanda as secretary, Job Ndlovu as deputy secretary, Belinda Ndebele as treasurer, and committee members are Stanley Ncube and Clement Malaba Ncube. The committee's mandate was to set up the association's structures in provinces and districts in preparation for the inaugural congress where the substantive executive was to be elected. The association would work closely with the mother party ZAPU.

=== National Consultative Convention ===
At the party conference, the ZAPU National Consultative Convention, held from 13 to 14 December 2008, Dumiso Dabengwa, a former Home Affairs minister was elected interim chairperson with the mandate to convene a two-day congress starting 11 April 2009. The congress would formally endorse the pullout from ZANU and elect an executive for the party.

=== Party Congress of 2009 ===
The party congress of 2009, which was supposed to elect new leadership, took place a month later than scheduled, on 16 May 2009. The congress formally endorsed the party's withdrawal from ZANU PF and withdrew support for its former members who had chosen to remain in ZANU. The congress was attended by delegates from the country's 10 provinces as well as representatives from Canada, South Africa, Botswana and Swaziland. The party's new platform promised to restore "respectable nationhood" where the people were "the pivot around which proper, able and accountable leadership is elected."

=== Party Congress of 2010 ===
A full Congress was held in August 2010, at which a full policy was agreed and leadership elected with Dumiso Dabengwa as president and Emilia Mukaratirwa as vice-president.

== See also ==
- African independence movements
- Rhodesian propaganda war
