= Abortion in Zimbabwe =

Abortion in Zimbabwe is available under limited circumstances. Zimbabwe's current abortion law, the Termination of Pregnancy Act, was enacted by Rhodesia's white minority government in 1977. The law permits abortion if the pregnancy endangers the life of the woman or threatens to permanently impair her physical health, if the child may be born with serious physical or mental defects, or if the fetus was conceived as a result of rape or incest. Nevertheless, an estimated 70,000+ illegal abortions are performed in Zimbabwe each year.

== Terminology ==
The Termination of Pregnancy Act defines abortion as "the termination of a pregnancy otherwise than with the intention of delivering a live child."

== History ==
Before 1977, abortion in Zimbabwe (then Rhodesia) was governed Roman-Dutch common law and English case law, namely the 1861 Offences Against the Person Act, which permitted abortion only to save the life of the pregnant woman. This principle was clarified in the 1938 case Rex v. Bourne, in which Justice Malcolm Macnaghten ruled that abortion could be legally performed to save the mother's life. At the time, Bulawayo was the "abortion centre" of Rhodesia, with most abortion procedures being performed by gynaecologists at Bulawayo Central Hospital.

With the advent of the women's liberation movement in Rhodesia in the early 1970s, debate over the country's abortion law increased. In July 1976, the government's Commission of Inquiry into the Termination of Pregnancy in Rhodesia published its recommendations that some restrictions on abortion be loosened. In the report, the commission acknowledged that "perhaps the majority of younger Rhodesians wish to see abortion laws liberalized." The commission recommended that abortion be permitted under the following conditions:

- "Where the continuation of the pregnancy constitutes a danger to the life of the mother and termination is necessary to ensure her life;
- "where the continuation of the pregnancy constitutes a serious threat to the physical health of the mother and termination is necessary to ensure her continued health;
- "where the continuation of pregnancy creates a great danger of serious and permanent damage to the mother's mental health and termination is necessary to avoid such danger;
- "where there exists a serious risk on scientific grounds that the child to be born will suffer from a mental or physical defect so that he will be seriously handicapped;
- "where the child is conceived as a result of rape or incest;
- "where the mother is an idiot or imbecile."

The commission's report, and the proposed legislation in Parliament that followed, sparked public debate on the issue, and in the months that followed, The Rhodesia Herald regularly published letters from white Rhodesians on what it described as "a key social issue in Rhodesian society."

In the journal Zambezia, Diana Seager, a sociology lecturer at the University of Rhodesia, expressed dissatisfaction with the commission's finding, writing that while they made a "seemingly liberal gesture... in substance [their] recommendations are no different from previous legislation." Jacquie Stafford, president of the National Organisation for Women, wrote to The Herald that "the recommendations of the Commission... were quite conservative... not going as far as many women would have liked." Political activist Diana Mitchell asked in a letter, "why are the women of Rhodesia not consulted on this controversial subject?" She opined that abortion "should be left to the individuals concerned." At the same time, other letters to The Herald expressed opposition to liberalized abortion laws. Roy Buckle, a Salisbury resident, argued that expanded access to legal abortion represented the "thin end of the wedge and that further liberalization will follow." None of the writers were black Rhodesians, and none of the letters addressed how black women might be affected.

As much as abortion was a social and moral issue, it was also a racial issue in Rhodesia. Many on the far-right of the white population viewed abortion primarily as a means to combat the rapid growth of the black population. As a result, liberalized abortion laws might be viewed by black Rhodesians as a means for genocide of their race.

In December 1976, acting on the commission's findings, the Parliament introduced legislation addressing abortion. The Termination of Pregnancy Act (No. 29 of 1977), which took effect on 1 January 1978, expanded abortion access, allowing the procedure under three conditions: if the pregnancy endangers the life of the woman or threatens to permanently impair her physical health, if the child may be born with serious physical or mental defects, or if the fetus was conceived as a result of rape or incest. Under the former law, the latter two conditions were not circumstances under which a legal abortion could be obtained. Although the new law expanded abortion access, it did not go far enough for some: Jacquie Stafford, president of the National Organisation for Women, wrote in a letter to The Herald that the law "showed nothing but contempt for the women of this country, and makes me wonder at the sanity of our parliamentary representatives."

After Zimbabwe's independence in 1980, the new black government retained the Termination of Pregnancy Act.

In recent years, there has been growing vocal support to amend the law and expand legal abortion access. Many support expanded legal abortion access in order to end unsafe illegal abortions which often threatens the health of the mother, or results in maternal death. Zimbabwean women are 200 times more likely to die from an abortion procedure than women in South Africa, where obtaining an abortion is easier. And Zimbabwe's maternal mortality rate is three times higher than South Africa. One abortion-rights group active in Zimbabwe is Right Here Right Now (RHRN), which advocates for a review of the Termination of Pregnancy Act, which they consider "archaic". Other calls to expand access to legal abortion came from the organization Zimbabwe Doctors for Human Rights, as well as former Minister of Finance Tendai Biti.

== Current legal status ==
Abortion is legally permitted under limited circumstances. In accordance with the Termination of Pregnancy Act, an abortion may be legally performed if the pregnancy seriously endangers the mother's life or threatens to permanently impair her physical health, if there is a significant risk that the child would be born with serious physical or mental defects, or if the fetus was conceived as a result unlawful intercourse, defined as rape, incest, or intercourse with a mentally handicapped woman (other sexual offenses, like statutory rape, are not legal grounds for an abortion).

An abortion may only be performed by a medical practitioner in an institution designated by the Ministry of Health and Child Care, with the written permission of the hospital superintendent or administrator. In order for the abortion procedure to be performed, two medical practitioners who are not from the same medical partnership or institution must certify that the requisite conditions indeed exist. In cases of unlawful intercourse, (rape, incest, or intercourse with a mentally handicapped woman), a court magistrate of the jurisdiction in which the abortion would take place must issue a certificate certifying that the pregnancy was probably that the result of unlawful intercourse as defined in the Act. Abortion services are provided by the Ministry of Health and Child Care, and are free to low-income and unemployed women.

Illegal abortion carries a penalty of imprisonment up to five years and/or a fine. The Termination of Pregnancy Act set the fine at Z$5,000 (approx. US$563 in 1997). However, Zimbabwe no longer uses the Zimbabwean dollar. Under section 60 of the Criminal Law and Codification Reform Act, illegal abortion is punishable by up to five years in prison and/or a fine not exceeding level 10.

== Statistics ==
=== Illegal abortions ===
A UNICEF report in 2005 estimated that around 70,000 illegal abortions take place in Zimbabwe each year. Government estimates indicate that more than 80,000 illegal abortions happen every year. In 2017, Ministry of Health and Child Care official Dr. Bernard Madzima estimated that illegal abortions causes 16% of maternal deaths, half of whom were adolescents. Most illegal abortions obtained by adolescent mothers occur in rural areas. Illegal abortions are also often performed illegally by city doctors. In 2014, over 2,000 young women ages 17 to 25 sought post-abortion care at Harare Hospital, and at Parirenyatwa Hospital treats over 100 women per month seeking post-abortion care.

== Public opinion ==
2018 survey, question on whether the Constitution should protect abortion rights
1. Full abortion rights (40.0%)
2. In some instances (39.0%)
3. No legal abortion (19.0%)
4. 2.00%

A 2018 survey on the Constitution of Zimbabwe found that 40% of respondents favored full constitutional abortion rights, 39% supported abortion rights in certain instances, and 19% were completely opposed to any constitutional abortion rights. The survey results showed that Zimbabwean men were more supportive of abortion rights than women, with 46% of men supporting full rights for women to an abortion, compared to 39% of women holding the same view.

== See also ==
- Abortion by country
- Human rights in Zimbabwe
- Reproductive rights
