= Ruvheneko =

Zimbabwean radio and television talk show host (born 1988)

Ruvheneko Parirenyatwa
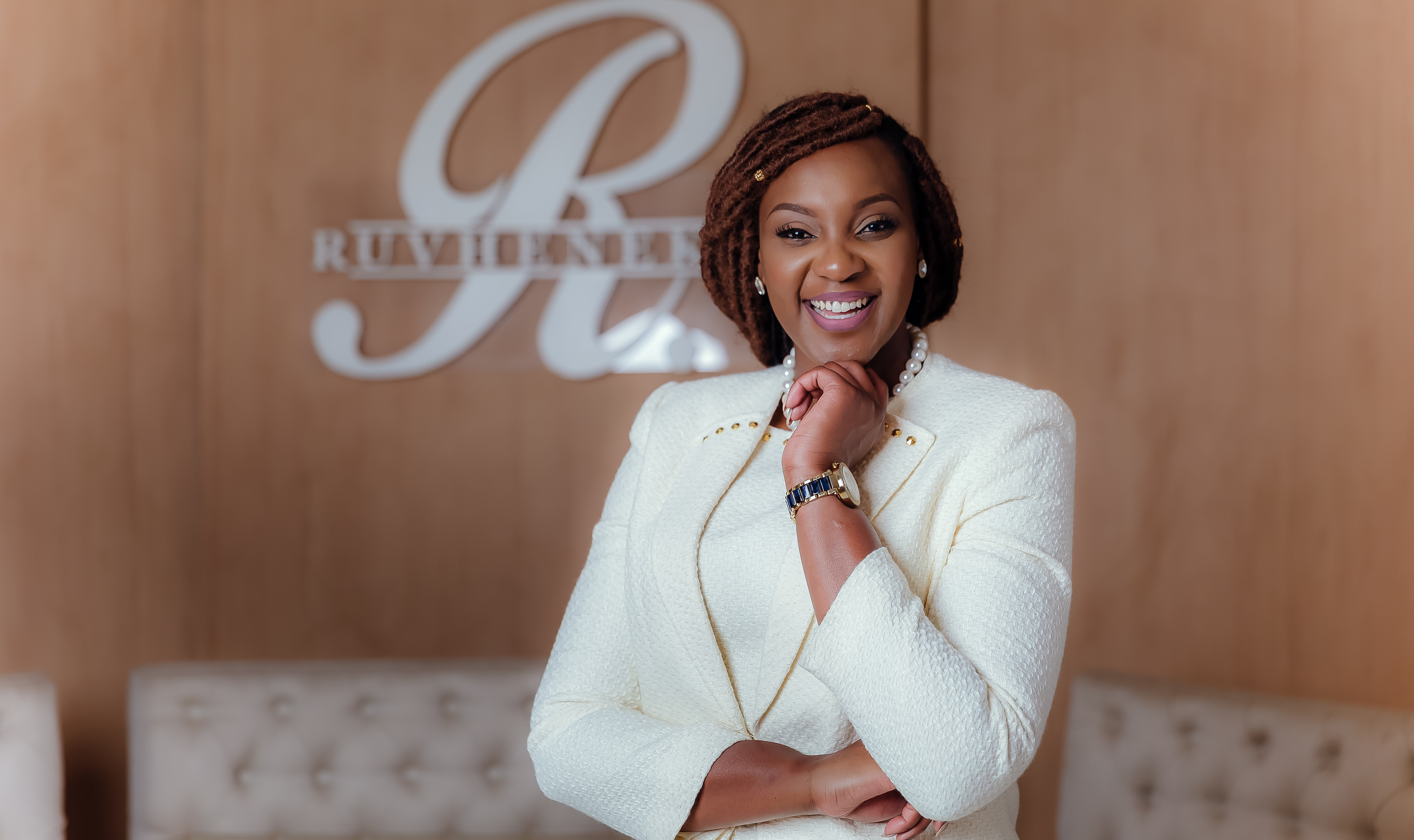
- Born: Ruvheneko Elsie Parirenyatwa; 15 September 1988 (age 37)
- Education: University of Cape Town
- Occupations: Radio and television host
- Spouse: Tendai Mafara (m. 2014; div. 2021)
- Father: David Parirenyatwa
- Relatives: Samuel Parirenyatwa (grandfather)
- Website: www.ruvheneko.com

Ruvheneko Elsie Parirenyatwa (born 15 September 1988) is a Zimbabwean radio and television talk show host, emcee, voice-over artist, brand ambassador and philanthropist. She is a talk show host for Ruvheneko, a current affairs talk show that airs on YouTube as well as on radio for Zimbabwe's Capitalk 100.4 FM and Star FM.

== Early life ==
Ruvheneko Parirenyatwa was born on 15 September 1988. She is the daughter of politician and physician David Parirenyatwa and Choice Parirenyatwa. She is also the granddaughter of Tichafa Samuel Parirenyatwa, the first black medical doctor in Southern Rhodesia and for whom the Parirenyatwa Hospital is named.

=== Education ===
Parirenyatwa attended Chisipite Senior School from 2001 to 2006. She initially wanted to be a pediatrician because her father is a doctor, but decided against it after failing her O Levels in biology. She entered the University of Cape Town as a law student, but later switched to a media degree program after taking a media elective in her second year. She graduated with a Bachelor of Arts in media, writing, and political science in 2009. She later earned a postgraduate diploma in marketing at the same university.

== Broadcasting career ==
Parireyatwan's broadcasting career began while she was a student at the University of Cape Town (UCT). She joined the university's radio station as the current affairs talk show host in her second year.

In November 2013, she was nominated to participate in the Africa Leadership Project that was launched in 2014. She has emceed at the former First Lady Grace Mugabe's 50th birthday as well as the former First Daughter Bona and Simba Chikore's wedding. Parirenyatwa is the presenter of The Zimbabwe Election Debates Series with Election Resource Centre Zimbabwe, broadcast on Star FM and Capitalk 100.4FM, and has since interviewed politicians on her talk shows. Additionally, Parireyatwan is a Radio Division Projects Manager at Zimpapers and is also studying a Master of Science in International Relations at the University of Zimbabwe.

=== ZiFM Stereo ===
In Harare, Parirenyatwa was the radio presenter and producer for current affairs at ZiFM Stereo from 2012-2016. From 2015-2016, she also took on the role of programming manager.

Parirenyatwa said her departure from the privately-owned radio station, ZiFM, was largely "political."

She hosted an online TV show which aired on Facebook Live, along with talk shows on Capitalk 100.4 FM and Star FM Zimbabwe.

== Philanthropy ==
Parirenyatwa was the deputy chairperson of the Harare Youth Council, an organisation focused on opportunities for youth in Zimbabwe. She co-founded the ZinboLove Foundation in 2013, a charitable organization that assists with blood transfusions costs.

== Awards ==
Parirenyatwa has received the following awards:

- Women's Top Business Leader of the Year – Special Recognition in Media and Broadcasting Excellence from Women's Leadership Awards (2017)
- Top Outstanding Woman in Broadcast Media & Radio in Republic of Zimbabwe from Women's Heritage Society World Organization (WHSWO) (2015)
- Top 20 outstanding woman in Business for the year 2015 special recognition in good media relations from the Megafest business awards,
- Radio personality of the year (Zimbabwe Business awards 2014)

== Personal life ==
In 2014, Parirenyatwa married Tendai Mafara. In 2021, the couple divorced and announced they had separated in 2016. In March 2022, Parirenyatwa announced she was pregnant with her first child.
