= Parirenyatwa =

Parirenyatwa is a Zimbabwean surname. Notable people with the surname include:

- David Parirenyatwa (born 1950), Zimbabwean politician
- Tichafa Samuel Parirenyatwa (1927–1962), Zimbabwe physician
  - Parirenyatwa Hospital in Harare named after Tichafa
