= Douglas Mombeshora =

Zimbabwean politician

The Honourable Dr. Douglas Mombeshora MP

Minister of Health and Child Care
- Incumbent
- Assumed office 12 September 2023
- President: Emmerson Mnangagwa
- Deputy: Sleiman Timios Kwidini
- Preceded by: Constantino Chiwenga

Member of Parliament for Mhangura
- Incumbent
- Assumed office 4 September 2023
- President: Emmerson Mnangagwa
- Preceded by: Chinhamo Precious Masango
- Constituency: Mhangura
- Majority: 25,857 (79.5%)
- In office 12 May 2008 – 29th July 2018
- President: Robert Mugabe; Emmerson Mnangagwa
- Preceded by: New constituency
- Succeeded by: Chinhamo Precious Masango

Minister of Lands and Rural Resettlement
- In office 10 September 2013 – 30 November 2017
- President: Robert Mugabe
- Preceded by: Hebert Murerwa
- Succeeded by: Perrance Shiri

Deputy Minister of Health and Child Care
- In office 13 February 2009 – 29 June 2013
- President: Robert Mugabe
- Prime Minister: Morgan Tsvangirai
- Minister: Henry Madzorera

Senator for Makonde–Chinhoyi
- In office 26 November 2005 – 28 March 2008
- President: Robert Mugabe
- Preceded by: Seat established
- Succeeded by: Virginia Katyamaenza

Personal details
- Born: 6 January 1961 (age 65) Makonde
- Party: ZANU-PF
- Education: University of Zimbabwe; Chinhoyi University of Technology

Douglas Tendai Mombeshora is the current Minister of Health and Child Care of Zimbabwe. He is also the Member of House of Assembly for Mhangura. He has previously served as Zimbabwe's Lands Minister from 2013 to 2018. He was appointed Minister of Lands following the 2013 harmonized elections. He also served as Deputy Minister of Health and Child Welfare during the Inclusive Government of 2009–2013.

Dr Mombeshora studied at Kutama College alongside fellow Cabinet Ministers, Dr Ignatius Chombo, Walter Chidhakwa and the late President of the Republic of Zimbabwe Robert Gabriel Mugabe.
