= Iain Kay =

Zimbabwean farmer and politician

Member of the House of Assembly of Zimbabwe for Marondera Central
- In office 2009–2013
- Preceded by: Constituency established
- Succeeded by: Ray Kaukonde

Personal details
- Born: 1949 (age 76–77) Marandellas, Southern Rhodesia
- Party: MDC (before 2005); MDC–T (after 2005)
- Spouse: Kerry Kay
- Children: 5 (incl. 2 adopted)
- Parent(s): Jock Kay; Peggy Kay
- Occupation: Farmer; politician

Military service
- Allegiance: Rhodesia
- Branch/service: Rhodesian Army
- Unit: Selous Scouts
- Battles/wars: Rhodesian Bush War

James Hamilton Iain Kay (born 1949) is a Zimbabwean farmer and politician who served in the House of Assembly from 2009 to 2013. Previously, he was a commercial farmer near Marondera, Mashonaland East Province. He was also the subject of violent attacks by ZANU–PF war veterans during the land reform program after the 2000 parliamentary elections.

Kay was born on Chipesa Farm, his father's estate, in Marondellas, Southern Rhodesia. His father, Jock Kay, was a farmer and politician who served as Deputy Minister of Agriculture of Zimbabwe from 1988 to 1990. During the Rhodesian Bush War, Kay served in the Selous Scouts. After his father's death, Kay took over the management of Chipesa Farm, growing tobacco and maize and raising livestock. In April 2000, around 60 ZANU–PF supporters and Bush War veterans invaded the farm, staking claim to it and violently beating Kay because of his support for the Movement for Democratic Change. He managed to escape alive, but when a police officer came to arrest the occupiers, they shot and killed him, attracting the attention of international media and raising concerns that the land reform program could spark a greater conflict. After the attack, Kay and his family found refuge in Harare, returning to the farm several months later. In July 2001, veterans once again invaded the farm, holding Kay and three neighbors hostage. In March 2002, Kay abandoned Chipesa Farm for good after 53 years of family ownership.

In 2005, Kay ran as the Movement for Democratic Change candidate for the Marondera East constituency. In a campaign marked by confrontation by ZANU–PF partisans, Kay earned 35% of the vote, losing to Defence Minister Sydney Sekeramayi, who earned 66%. The election was allegedly influenced by electoral fraud, as the total number of votes was said to have exceeded actual voter turnout. In 2008, Kay ran as the MDC–T candidate for the Marondera Central constituency. He won 66% of the vote against ZANU–PF candidate Peter Murwira, and was seated in the Zimbabwean House of Assembly in 2009. In March 2011, he was seen as a likely candidate to be nominated by his party for the post of Deputy Minister of Agriculture, Mechanisation and Irrigation Development, but this ultimately did not materialize. In 2013, Kay lost his seat in Parliament to Ray Kaukonde, the ZANU–PF provincial party chairperson for Mashonaland East. Later that year, the MDC–T gave Kay a five-year suspension from politics after he criticized party leader Morgan Tsvangirai and called for a change in party leadership. Following his removal from active politics, Kay was unemployed and struggling financially.

== Early life and education ==
Kay was born c. 1949 in Marondellas (now Marondera), Southern Rhodesia. He was born and raised on Chipesa Farm, which his father purchased in 1948. His father was Jock Kay, a farmer and ZANU–PF politician who served as Deputy Minister of Agriculture of Zimbabwe from 1988 to 1990. His mother was Peggy Kay. Kay grew up on the farm, where his family's cook, Sydney Tuhna, was a father figure to him. Kay grew up speaking English and Shona and spending hours playing in the bush with Tuhna's children.

During the Rhodesian Bush War, Kay served in the Rhodesian Security Forces as a member of the Selous Scouts.

== Farming career ==
After his father's death, Kay took over management of Chipesa Farm, a 5,000-acre estate developed from virgin land in 1948, located 50 miles east of Harare, the capital. On the farm, Kay grew maize and tobacco. The farm supported 500 workers and family members, and included a school, pub, women's center, and a healthcare worker. In 2000, the Kays built a new, thatched-roof house to replace the small cottage that had been there.

In addition to commercial farming, Kay engaged in projects intended to improve farming practices among Zimbabwe's rural population. In the 1990s, he began hosting monthly discussion groups in different communities, in which Kay would meet with local farmers to discuss dehorning, disease control, and dipping tank construction. A small fee was charged for attendance which was used to fund different projects. In addition, Kay set aside eight bulls from his herd and loaned one to individual villages for two-year periods to help them improve the gene pool of their stock. A similar program was created with goats. These programs were stopped when the ruling party ZANU–PF's disapproval became evident.

=== 2000–01 farm invasions and aftermath ===
On 3 April 2000, around 60 ZANU–PF supporters and black Bush War veterans invaded Kay's farm. His property, Chipesa Farm, was among the first to be occupied during the Zimbabwean land reform period following the violent 2000 election. At the start of the invasion, Kay was inside the property's primary school where the farm workers' children attend, where he was taking measurements for an additional classroom.

The assailants found him and dragged him outside. The war veterans bound his hands with barbed wire and whipped and beat him for a long time, using sticks, axe handles, and belts. When his captors were distracted by an arriving vehicle, Kay managed to escape and dove into a nearby reservoir. None of his attackers could swim, but they aimed rocks at him through the water. The attack on Chipesa Farm was reported to local police, who sent a young officer to investigate. After he tried to arrest one of the attackers, the officer, 25-year-old Constable Finashe Chikwenaya, was shot dead by the ZANU–PF occupiers. The murder came after three of the occupiers had already been arrested. After the officer was killed, Kay was able to escape the farm with the arrival of his son, David.

After the attack, the invaders continued to occupy Chipesa Farm. Kay and his family sought refuge in Harare, and the farm's 120 employees and their 380 dependents were forced away from the farm. The murder of the police constable attracted the attention of the international media, and raised concerns that the farm invasions could spark a larger conflict. After being rescued, Kay spent several days in the Marondera hospital recovering from the beating. After fleeing to Harare, the Kay family spent a few months in the KwaZulu-Natal province of South Africa. While they were away, neighbors prepared the land and planted tobacco seeds for the next harvest. When the veterans tried to stop them, Kay's farmworkers drove them away. After five months, the Kays returned to Zimbabwe, finding their farm abandoned and vandalized. Kay resumed farming, but continued to be harassed by the war veterans. Neighbors reported that the attacks on the farm were because of Kay's support for the Movement for Democratic Change, the main opposition party.

On 5 July 2001, 60 war veterans once again occupied Chipesa Farm. The invaders chased away his 120 workers and caused Kay and his son David to lock themselves in the house to remain safe. Chipesa Farm was one of hundreds that were occupied as President Robert Mugabe encouraged war veterans to seize white-owned farms by force. Later that day, two neighboring farmers who had come to help, Kim Nilson and Trevor Steel, also took refuge in the farmhouse. The veterans eventually broke down the doors and began holding the four farmers hostage in the house, threatening to kill them. Police arrived at the scene to deal with the situation. The attack was partially related to Kay's support of opposition political parties and his opposition to ZANU–PF. Three of Kay's workers were beaten badly and taken to the hospital by police.

In August 2001, Kay's son came across a rudimentary roadblock of boulders placed on the farm's driveway. One of the rocks had been booby trapped with a primed grenade. Several months later, Kay's adopted son John Rutherford, 34, was attacked on a nearby farm and beaten nearly to death. The ZANU–PF assailants responsible for the attack murdered Rutherford's 29-year-old security guard, Darlington Vhekaveka. In March 2002, the Kay family abandoned Chipesa Farm for good after 53 years, and moved into rented accommodations.

== Political career ==
=== 2005 parliamentary election ===
Kay ran as the Movement for Democratic Change (MDC) candidate in the 2005 Zimbabwean parliamentary election. Kay ran against ZANU–PF candidate Sydney Sekeramayi, the Minister of Defence, in Marondera East, a constituency with a history of electoral violence. In the previous 2000 election, the MDC candidate was forced to leave town, his home was torched, and his supporters were allegedly tortured at ZANU–PF headquarters. By 2005, the situation had settled down enough that Kay and the MDC were able to actively campaign. Marondera East is an important district, and one that traditionally votes for ZANU–PF. Kay said he ran for Parliament because "it is the right thing to do." Although he was told by some that we was "courting trouble" by running, he says others came to him and asked him to stand for election.

Although there was more openness than the previous election, Kay's opposition campaign still met resistance from ZANU–PF partisans. In early March 2005, the United Methodist church that Kay attended was burned to the ground to scare MDC supporters. Though convinced he had more support than Sekeramayi, he worried that memories of the violence of the 2000 election could harm his prospects. In addition, he was concerned that the increased number of voting stations (90, up from 50 the last election) could be a ploy used by ruling officials to better locate opposition enclaves and target them with retaliation. Ahead of his major campaign rally, Kay had to hold three meetings in caves, to avoid being arrested for breaking the Public Order and Security Act, which restricted freedom of assembly and was used by police to prevent political opposition meetings. And the hundreds of posters put up by his campaign team in the days leading up to the rally were ripped down by ZANU–PF youths. He convinced friends to lend him trucks for the rally, although they feared harassment by party members.

Kay's first major campaign rally was held in Marondera on 16 March, two weeks before election day. MDC leader Morgan Tsvangirai was present, and 600 supporters attended, listening to speeches and chanting "Chinja, chinja!" (Change!). Party members were surprised at the large turnout, as turnout of the last MDC rally in 2000 was zero, due to the fear of ZANU–PF violence. Kay, standing next to his wife and sons, spoke to the crowd and chanted along with them. About 50 yards away, 700 people Kay described as "swing voters" stood, quietly watching. Kay held his rally in a public area so that these swing voters could view the rally. If he had held it in the local stadium, many of these people would not have dared enter to view the rally and associate themselves publicly with the MDC. After the rally, Kay remained at the site to make sure supporters who had been trucked in got home safely and without incident.

While Kay's ability to publicly campaign was an improvement for the MDC since 2000, his chances of victory were still dampened by a lingering fear of ZANU–PF. Sekeramayi was a formidable opponent, and ZANU–PF engaged in an extensive door-to-door campaign. On election day, 31 March 2005, Kay, with 10,066 votes, lost to Sekeramayi, with 19,912 votes. Sekeramayi's victory was marred by suspected electoral fraud; the total number of votes in the district allegedly exceeded actual voter turnout.

=== 2008 election and Member of Parliament ===
In the 2008 parliamentary election, Kay ran as the MDC–T candidate for the newly created Marondera Central constituency. He won with 66% of the vote against ZANU–PF candidate Peter Murwira. During the campaign, Kay was the victim of political violence, involving property destruction that he was not compensated for. On 20 May 2008, two months after the election, Kay was arrested, along with several other opposition politicians, for allegedly inciting public violence. He applied for a discharge in early June before a Marondera magistrate.

In March 2011, Kay was put forward by his party as the likely nominee for the post of Deputy Minister of Agriculture, Mechanisation and Irrigation Development. Roy Bennett, the previous presumptive nominee, was taken out of consideration due to his self-imposed exile in South Africa and his impending expulsion from the Senate. Kay was then chosen as the best candidate because of his past experience in agriculture as a commercial farmer. Ultimately, Kay never took office as deputy minister.

=== 2013 election and suspension from party ===
In the 2013 election, Kay, the MDC–T incumbent, ran against ZANU–PF candidate Ray Kaukonde, the party's provincial chairperson for Mashonaland East Province. In the year prior to the election, Kay was subjected to accusations spread by ZANU–PF campaigners who alleged that Kay committed atrocities while a member of the Selous Scouts during the Rhodesian Bush War. Local ZANU–PF officials filmed a dramatized propaganda documentary, which was broadcast on Zimbabwe Broadcasting Corporation. Ultimately, Kay lost to Kaukonde by a margin of 52% of the vote to Kay's 44%.

In 2013, Kay was punished with a five-year suspension from the MDC–T after he called for leadership change and described party leader Morgan Tsvangirai as a rusty bolt in need of replacement. Following a hearing, Kay was given the suspension by the party's provincial chair for Mashonaland East. Following his removal from active politics, Kay faced financial struggles and unemployment.

== Personal life ==
Kay and his wife Kerry have three adult sons, David, Bruce, and Clive. They have an adopted adult son, John Rutherford, and an adopted daughter, Lindsay, whose parents died in a plane crash in 2000.

Kay attends a United Methodist church in Marondera, which he helped build and where his wife carries out work with AIDS orphans. The church was burned in 2005 during Kay's parliamentary campaign as an act of intimidation.

Kay's wife, Kerry, is the national AIDS coordinator for the Commercial Farmers' Union.

== Electoral history ==
2005 Zimbabwean parliamentary election, Marondera East constituency

- Sydney Sekeramayi (ZANU–PF) – 19,912 (66.42%)
- Iain Kay (MDC) – 10,066 (33.58%)

2008 Zimbabwean parliamentary election, Marondera Central constituency

- Iain Kay (MDC–T) – 8,022 (66.28%)
- Peter Murwira (ZANU–PF) – 3,170 (26.19%)
- Others (Ind) – 844 (7.53%)

2013 Zimbabwean parliamentary election, Marondera Central constituency

- Ray Kaukonde (ZANU–PF) – 9,308 (52.43%)
- Iain Kay (MDC–T) – 7,892 (44.45%)
- Mandaza Kudzanai (MDC–M) – 314 (1.77%)
- Carlos Mudzongo (Ind) – 112 (0.64%)
