= List of hospitals in Zimbabwe =

There are 214 hospitals in Zimbabwe as of 2015. Of that total, which does not include smaller clinics, 120 are government hospitals run by the Ministry of Health and Child Care, 66 are mission hospitals, and the remaining 32 are privately operated. The government hospital system includes six central hospitals, eight provincial hospitals, and 63 district-level hospitals, with the rest being rural hospitals. The following list is sorted by province.

== Bulawayo ==
- Bulawayo Central Hospital
- Hillside Hospital
- Ingutsheni Hospital
- Lady Rodwell Maternity Hospital
- Mater Dei Hospital
- Mpilo Central Hospital
- Nervous Disorders Hospital
- Richard Morris Hospital
- Robbie Gibson Hospital
- St Francis Hospital
- Thorngrove Isolation Hospital
- Melpolha Hospital

== Harare ==
- Arcadia Medical Centre
- The Avenues Clinic
- Baines Avenue Clinic
- Baines Intercare Medical Centre
- Beatrice Road Infectious Diseases Hospital
- Belvedere Maternity Hospital
- Belvedere Medical Centre
- Citimed Chitungwiza Hospital, Chitungwiza
- Corporate 24 Medical Centre
- Dandaro Clinic
- Diagnostic Heart Center
- Harare Central Hospital
- Harare Maternity Hospital
- Highfield Poly Clinic
- Marlborough Medical Centre
- Mbuya Docars Hospital
- Med24 Medical Centre
- Metropolitan Clinic
- Michael Gelfand Clinic
- Montagu Clinic
- New Cranborne Maternity Clinic
- Oncocare Cancer Treatment Centre
- Parirenyatwa Hospital
- Queen of Peace Clinic
- Rock Foundation Medical Center
- Sekuru Kaguvi Hospital
- St Anne's Hospital
- Suburban Medical Center
- Trauma Centre & Hospital, Belgravia, Harare
- West End Clinic
- West End Hospital
- Wilkins Infectious Diseases Hospital

== Manicaland ==
- Avila Mission Hospital
- Birchenough bridge hospital
- Bonda Mission Hospital
- Chikore Hospital
- Chipinge District Hospital
- Elim Mission Hospital
- Hauna Hospital
- Mount Melleray Mission Hospital
- Mount Selinda Hospital
- Buhera District Hospital
- Murambi Hospital
- Murambinda Mission Hospital
- Mutambara Mission Hospital
- Victoria Chitepo Provincial Hospital
- Nyanga District hospital
- Regina Coeli Mission Hospital
- Rusape General Hospital
- Rusitu Mission Hospital
- St. Peter's Mission Hospital, Checheche

== Mashonaland Central ==
- Bindura Provincial Hospital, Bindura District
- Chimhanda District Hospital
- Chitsungo Mission Hospital, Mbire District
- Concession District Hospital
- Guruve Hospital
- Howard Hospital
- Karanda Mission Hospital, Mount Darwin District
- Madziwa Hospital, Shamva District
- Mary Mount Mission Hospital, Rushinga District
- Mount Darwin District Hospital, Mount Darwin District
- Mvurwi Hospital, Mazowe District
- Nhowe Hospital
- PSMI Medical Clinic, Bindura
- Shamva Hospital, Shamva District
- Shashi Private Hospital, Bindura
- St Albert's Mission Hospital

== Mashonaland West ==
- Banket District Hospital
- Chegutu District Hospital
- Chidamoyo Mission Hospital
- Chinhoyi Provincial Hospital
- Darwendale Rural Hospital
- Father O'Hea Memorial Hospital
- Kadoma General Hospital
- Kariba District Hospital
- Karoi District Hospital
- Magunje Rural Hospital
- Mutorashanga Rural Hospital
- Norton General Hospital
- Raffingora Rural Hospital
- Sanyati Baptist Hospital
- St Michael's Hospital
- Zvimba Rural Hospital

== Masvingo ==
- Alheit Hospital, Gutu
- Bondolfi Hospital, Masvingo
- Chiredzi District Hospital, Chiredzi
- Chivi District Hospital, Chivi
- Dewure Clinic, Gutu
- Driefontein Hospital, Mvuma
- Gutu District Hospital, Mpandawana
- Gutu Mission Hospital, Gutu
- Mashoko Hospital, Bikita
- Masvingo General Hospital, Masvingo
- Morgenster Mission Hospital, Masvingo
- Mutero Mission Clinic, Gutu
- Mwenezi District Hospital, Mwenezi
- Ndanga District Hospital, Zaka
- Nemanwa Clinic, Masvingo
- Ngomahuru Psychiatric Hospital
- Silveira Mission Hospital, Bikita
- St Antony's Musiso Mission Hospital, Zaka

Chikombedzi Mission Hospital, Chiredzi

== Matabeleland North ==
- Binga District Hospital
- Dakamela Rural District Hospital
- Lukosi Hospital
- Hwange Colliery Hospital
- Hwange Medical Centre
- Mbuma Mission Hospital
- Nkayi Rural District Hospital
- St Luke's Hospital
- St Mary's Hospital
- St Patrick's Hospital
- Tsholotsho District Hospital
- Victoria Falls Hospital

== Matabeleland South ==
- Beitbridge District Hospital
- Esigodini District Hospital
- Filabusi District Hospital
- Gwanda Provincial Hospital
- Kezi rural Hospital
- Manama Mission Hospital
- Maphisa District Hospital
- Mtshabezi Mission Hospital
- Plumtree District Hospital
- St Anne's Mission Hospital, Brunapeg
- Tshelanyemba Mission Hospital

== Midlands ==
- Clay Bank Group of Hospitals
- Gokwe District Hospital
- Gweru Provincial Hospital
- Kwekwe General Hospital, Kwekwe
- Mnene Hospital
- St Gerald Chaya General Hospital
- Shurugwi District Hospital
- Zvishavane District Hospital
- Zvamavande Rural Hospital
- St Theresa Hama Rural Hospital
- Muvonde Hospital Driefontein
- Mvuma Medical Centre, Mvuma
- Midlands Private Hospital
- Bethel Clinic
- University Clinics
- Mberengwa Hospital

== Mashonaland East ==
- All Souls Mission Hospital
- Borrowdale Trust Hospital
- Chivhu General Hospital
- Kotwa Hospital
- Mahusekwa Hospital
- Makumbi Hospital
- Marondera Provincial Hospital
- Mutawatawa General Hospital
- Mutoko Hospital
- Nhowe Mission Hospital
- Nyadire Mission Hospital
- Sadza General Hospital
- Wedza District hospital
- Mount St Mary's mission hospital
- Gwirambira Gynaecologist Hospital
- Chitungwiza Central hospital
