= Vangelis Haritatos =

Zimbabwean businessman and politician

The Hon. Vangelis Haritatos MP
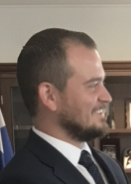

Minister of Lands and Rural Development
- Incumbent
- Assumed office 10 April 2026
- President: Emmerson Mnangagwa
- Deputy: Tsitsi Zhou
- Preceded by: New ministry

Deputy Minister of Lands, Agriculture, Fisheries, Water and Rural Development
- In office 11 September 2018 – 10 April 2026 Serving with: Douglas Karoro (2018-2022); Davis Marapira (2022-2026)
- President: Emmerson Mnangagwa
- Minister: Perrance Shiri (2018-2020); Anxious Masuka (2020-2026)
- Preceded by: Davis Marapira

Member of Parliament for Muzvezve
- Incumbent
- Assumed office 26 August 2018
- Preceded by: Peter Haritatos
- Constituency: Muzvezve
- Majority: 10,329 (44.6%)

Personal details
- Born: Vangelis Peter Haritatos; 8 April 1986 (age 40) Kwekwe, Zimbabwe
- Party: ZANU–PF
- Relations: Peter Haritatos (father)
- Children: 3
- Education: John Cabot University; Kansas State University

Vangelis Peter Haritatos (born 8 April 1986) is a Zimbabwean businessman and politician who has served as Minister of Lands and Rural Development since April 2026 and a Member of the National Assembly of Zimbabwe for Muzvezve since 2018. Haritatos is a member of the ruling ZANU–PF and his father, Peter Haritatos, was previously an MP for the same party.

== Early life and education ==
Haritatos was born on 8 April 1986 at the Redcliffe Medical Centre in Kwekwe, Zimbabwe. His father is from Cephalonia and emigrated from Greece in the 1950s. He attended Eiffel Flats Primary School, Jameson High School and Harare International School. He studied at the John Cabot University in Italy, majoring in international affairs and international business. During the same period, he fulfilled a joint programme with the University of Wales. He graduated from Kansas State University in the United States in 2007 with a Bachelor of Arts degree in politics and a Bachelor of Science degree in economics. Haritatos also studied for a degree in business administration.

== Political career ==
Haritatos has been a member of the ZANU–PF since 2002 and has been involved with the party's youth league. He was made the district youth secretary for transport of ward 13 of the now-defunct Mhondoro constituency in 2007. In 2008, he was named the deputy youth secretary of lands of the Mashonaland West Province as he became part of the provincial committee. He was promoted to the post of provincial youth finance secretary in 2009 and served in the post until 2013.

In 2018, his father Peter, incumbent MP for Muzvezve, decided against running for re-election and Haritatos was chosen as the ZANU–PF candidate, winning in a landslide on 30 July 2018. He was sworn in as a Member of Parliament on 5 September and was selected as the Deputy Minister for Lands, Agriculture, Water, Climate and Rural Resettlement on 11 September by President Emmerson Mnangagwa.

Haritatos was re-elected as MP for Muzvezve with 72% of the vote in the 2023 general election. He was reappointed as Deputy Minister for Lands, Agriculture, Water, Climate and Rural Resettlement by president Mnangagwa.

In 2026, Haritatos was appointed Minister of the newly created Ministry of Lands and Rural Development.

== Personal life ==
Haritatos resides in Kadoma with his wife and children. He formerly ran a bakery and confectionery shop.
