= St Anne's Hospital (Harare) =

- Little Company of Mary

Geography
- Location: Harare, Mashonaland, Zimbabwe

Organisation
- Care system: Private owned
- Type: COVID-19 response center
- Affiliated university: Roman Catholic Church, Ministry of Health and Child Care (Zimbabwe)

Services
- Emergency department: No
- Beds: 165

History
- Founded: 1941

Links
- Lists: Hospitals in Zimbabwe

St Anne's Hospital is a Roman Catholic health facility located in Harare, Zimbabwe.

St Anne's Hospital was established in 1941 by catholic sisters of the Little Company of Mary. The hospital has 165 beds and 6 theaters set on a three-storey building.

The hospital was run by Fred Mtandah's CAPS Holdings, a Zimbabwean pharmaceutical company from 2004 to February 2016 when the hospital closed for refurbishments after some legal disputes between the catholic company and CAPS Holdings. In August 2020, St Anne's Hospital was opened as a COVID-19 response centre. In June 2021, the hospital was officially reopened for admissions and treatment of COVID patients and non-COVID-19 patients.

The hospital has several sister hospitals around Zimbabwe which include Mt St Mary's Hospital in Wedza District, St Peter's Mission Hospital located in Checheche, Murambinda Mission Hospital in Buhera and Mashambanzou Care Trust in Harare.
