= Timothy Stamps =

Welsh and Zimbabwean politician and doctor

Minister of Health and Child Welfare of Zimbabwe
- In office 1986–2002
- President: Robert Mugabe
- Deputy: David Parirenyatwa
- Preceded by: Sydney Sekeramayi
- Succeeded by: David Parirenyatwa

Personal details
- Born: 15 October 1936 Wales, UK
- Died: 26 November 2017 (aged 81) Harare, Zimbabwe
- Citizenship: British; Zimbabwean
- Party: ZANU-PF
- Occupation: Health Adviser in the Office of the President and Cabinet
- Profession: Medical Doctor

Timothy John Stamps (15 October 1936 – 26 November 2017) was a Welsh and Zimbabwean politician and medical doctor who served in the Government of Zimbabwe as Minister of Health from 1986 to 2002. For most of that period, he was one of the few white members of the government.

== Early life and career ==
Stamps was born in Wales in 1936. After completing medical training at Cardiff Medical School, he initiated training in Paediatrics before becoming a GP in Newport, South Wales. He gained experience in Public Health in South Wales before moving, with his then wife and children, to Rhodesia in 1968 as Medical Officer of Health for Salisbury. He spent the remainder of his life in Rhodesia and Zimbabwe. He was promoted to Chief Medical Officer in 1970.

He was dismissed from this last post in 1974, allegedly for trying to switch the emphasis in healthcare provision slightly more towards the black community. At that time, whites comprised no more than 15% of the population of Salisbury but at least 60% of municipal spending on social services in the city was directed towards them.

After his dismissal, Stamps worked as a private GP and got involved in a number of community projects. In 1974 he gained a law degree at night school and became increasingly interested in politics. He became chairman of the 'Freedom from Hunger' campaign (a UN-sponsored organisation) in Rhodesia. In May 1976, he was elected to Salisbury City Council.

At the time of Zimbabwe's independence, an insurance funded healthcare system provided a first world provision for most whites. By contrast, most blacks enjoyed only the most basic of medical services. The only access to healthcare for blacks in rural areas was through mission station clinics or clinics provided by white farmers for workers and their families.

In the early-1980s, Stamps was active in raising finance from overseas sources (government, NGO and international organisations) to fund the construction of clinics and community hospitals in rural areas. The Zimbabwean government also sought to expand healthcare facilities and Stamps worked closely with the Ministry of Health on a number of projects. One thing Stamps found with these early projects was this it was less difficult to raise funds to cover the capital construction cost of a project than it was to cover its continuing revenue costs.

He also took an interest in wider social and economic problems facing Zimbabwe. The land tenure system which had been installed during the existence of Rhodesia had resulted in a situation in which most of the farming land in the country was either: (a) individually titled and white owned, or (b) collectively owned for use by African tribes. Both of these forms of tenure presented problems that needed to be urgently addressed. Although most Zimbabweans agreed on the need for reform in general terms, conservative elements (including both white farmers and African tribal chiefs) would put up stubborn resistance to specific proposals for reform.

Stamps sought to develop a new model for land ownership and usage. In 1982, he acquired a formerly white-owned dairy farm near Harare for development as a co-operative. Funded by a $2,000,000 grant from the German charity AgroAction, he was able to settle 2,000 people at this farm. Stamps claimed that Vuti farm became self-funding after eight years.

== Political career ==
At the 1980 election, Stamps fought the white roll Kopje constituency as an independent candidate against the Rhodesian Front. Although he polled only about one-third of the vote in a straight fight, this was the highest vote for any non-Rhodesian Front candidate. Along with a number of the white elite in the post-independence period, Stamps subsequently joined ZANU-PF. Being one of only a small number of party members with healthcare management experience, Stamps' advice and services were eagerly sought. He became a ZANU-PF Member of Parliament at the 1985 general election and in 1986 was appointed as Minister of Health and Child Welfare – a position he held until 2002.

When he inherited two large properties from a family member when that family member passed away of old age in 1992, he donated both properties to a charity that resettled indigenous small-holder farmers onto the land. A year later the resettlement was hailed as a successful example of a land resettlement program. By 1999, it was still being hailed as a success by observers as the resettled families reported that every year had resulted in successful harvests.

During his early years as a Minister, he promoted the development of community healthcare using the slogan "Health for All by the Year 2000".

He oversaw a substantial expansion of the Zimbabwean healthcare and public health systems in the late-1980s and early-1990s. This expansion attracted a great deal of favourable attention both at home and abroad. The Zimbabwe experience was often held up as an example for other developing countries. Stamps was given a lot of the credit for this and was frequently asked to address international conferences.

His credibility in Zimbabwe was such that he could speak out on various matters that other politicians would exercise caution over. For example, his predecessor as Health Minister had dismissed the AIDS epidemic as a fiction invented by the media to cause panic. In an interview in 1996, Stamps commented that:

Ministers have tended to shy away from the issue because it is seen as contaminated. AIDS activity by government is not seen as politically beneficial, since it may offend conservative religious and traditional groups and somehow attracts a stigma. There are no votes in talking about AIDS. Only lost votes."

Stamps was also critical of police conduct in attempting to maintain public order, notably when measures to quell disorder at an international football match in 2000 ended up leaving eleven people dead.

He also drew attention to "Project Coast", the name given to chemical and biological warfare programmes run by South Africa in the 1970s and 1980s. Project Coast was a chemical and biological weapons programmae of the South African Government, which included attempts to develop a contraceptive that could covertly be given to blacks. Stamps' suggestion that various epidemics in Rhodesia in the 1970s (notably, an anthrax epidemic in 1978) may have been the result of a biological attack was widely disbelieved. A 'Southern African Research and Documentation Centre' report has claimed an unnamed former senior member of the Rhodesian Security Forces alleged that the Rhodesian government intentionally infected cattle in the Tribal Trust Lands (TTLs) with anthrax and blamed guerilla militants. Presenting an alternative description of events, Colonel Lionel Dyke, a Mugabe ally who participated in the Gukurahundi, stated that anthrax and cholera spores (supplied by the South African Defence Force) were spread in the TTLs during the closing stages of the civil war, but claimed that this was the result of South African intelligence services treating the country as a "laboratory", and that Rhodesia had no capacity to produce anthrax or cholera.

Events in the late-1990s pushed Zimbabwe into economic recession. This made it difficult to sustain many of the new healthcare facilities and services that had been constructed in earlier years. The government was struggling with a large budget deficit and the external bodies that had provided funding for building and equipment costs in the past seemed reluctant to fund the continuing operation of the associated facilities. Bad publicity concerning corruption, cronyism and incompetence in Zimbabwe did not help in this regard. The salaries paid to doctors and nurses were eroded by inflation, and many key personnel emigrated. There were also a series of damaging strikes that attracted unfavourable attention at home and abroad. Stamps found himself struggling to prevent the collapse of the system he had built up, and was reported to have lost his temper with media and union representatives on several occasions.

During most of his time as Health Minister, Stamps was the only white member of the government. As such, he was often called upon to present the government's position on various matters which were outside his normal brief. For example, he frequently defended the government's policy on land reforms in interviews with Western journalists. This made him a hate figure to many White Zimbabweans. His popularity among both the members of ZANU-PF and the wider population declined as a result of problems in the healthcare system. However, Stamps remained well regarded by President Mugabe.

During the near breakdown in relations between Whites in Zimbabwe and the ZANU-PF government around the time of the 2000 election, Stamps attempted to exercise some moderating influence on the situation:

Whites are the face of the problem, but the causes go deeper than that. In general, our race relations are good – certainly much better than those of our neighbour, South Africa. We have the opportunity to improve on the solid black/white relationship that has been built over the past 20 years. It is the extremists who are creating divisions.

Stamps actively campaigned for ZANU-PF in the 2000 election and was returned to the House of Assembly as a non-constituency MP. He carried on as Health Minister until March 2002, but was becoming increasingly exhausted, and in late 2001 he suffered a stroke. He was replaced as Health Minister by his deputy, David Parirenyatwa, in August 2002; due to Stamps' illness, Parirenyatwa had already been effectively running the ministry. After leaving the government, Stamps acted as adviser on health matters to the Office of the President.

As a footnote to his political career, in July 2002 Stamps was one of 92 Zimbabweans subject to EU "smart sanctions" intended to express disapproval of various Zimbabwe government policies. Stamps was banned from the EU and access to assets he owned in the EU was frozen. Many observers found the EU's treatment of Dr. Stamps to be curious, given that by July 2002 he was retired from politics and a semi-invalid. Also, he had never been implicated in human rights abuses, anti-democratic acts, corruption or any other form of wrongdoing.

In February 2008, as Health Adviser in the Office of the President and Cabinet, Stamps attended President Mugabe's eighty-fourth birthday celebrations with several other high-profile ZANU-PF party members.

== Death ==
Dr. Timothy Stamps died on 26 November 2017 after succumbing to a lung infection on Sunday at the Borrowdale Trauma Centre in Harare. The Government of Zimbabwe declared him a National Hero. He was buried at National Heroes' Acre. In 2017, Zimbabwe's second President Emmerson Mnangagwa gave a speech encouraging all Zimbabweans to follow the example of cooperation and patriotism set by Timothy Stamps.

== See also ==
- List of Welsh medical pioneers
