= Harare Central Hospital =

Sally Mugabe Central Hospital

Geography
- Location: Southerton, Harare, Zimbabwe

Organisation
- Care system: Government
- Type: General
- Affiliated university: Ministry of Health and Child Care (Zimbabwe), Faculty of Medicine, University of Zimbabwe

Services
- Beds: 2000

History
- Founded: 1958

Links
- Lists: Hospitals in Zimbabwe
- Other links: List of hospitals in Zimbabwe

Sally Mugabe Central Hospital also known as Harare Central Hospital/Gomo Hospital is the second largest public hospital in Zimbabwe after Parirenyatwa Hospital. The hospital is the main referral center for patients and casualties from the Northern half of Zimbabwe and is also the main services hospital for greater Harare residents.

Harare Hospital was officially opened on 2 May 1958 by the then Governor General of the Federation of Rhodesia and Nyasaland, Lord Dalhousie.

The hospital has been the main teaching hospital for the University of Zimbabwe's Faculty of Medicine's practical lectures since 1966 and has full accreditation by the College of Surgeons for East-Central and Southern Africa status for the training of surgeons. The hospital is also a training hospital for nurses, theatre nurses, pediatric nurses, midwives, radiographers, laboratory technicians and pharmacy technicians.

== Main wards ==
- General ward
- Martenity ward/Harare Maternity Hospital/Pediatric Health Care facility
- Children's Ward/Harare Children's Hospital
- Psychiatric ward/Harare Central Psychiatric Unit

== Medical director ==
The chief medical director of the harare centre hospital is CMO Mr H. Mungani.
