= Termination of Pregnancy Act (Zimbabwe) =

- Coat of arms of Rhodesia

Parliament of Rhodesia Parliament of Zimbabwe
- Long title: Termination of Pregnancy Act, 1977
- Citation: No. 29 of 1977
- Territorial extent: Rhodesia (today Zimbabwe)
- Enacted by: the Parliament of Rhodesia
- Enacted: 1977
- Effective: 1 January 1978

Summary
- Expanded legal abortion access in Rhodesia (today Zimbabwe)
- Status: In force

The Termination of Pregnancy Act is a law in Zimbabwe governing abortion. Enacted in 1977 by the Parliament of Rhodesia and effective starting 1 January 1978, it was retained after Zimbabwe's independence in 1980. The law expanded abortion access, permitting it under three circumstances: if the pregnancy endangers the life of the woman or threatens to permanently impair her physical health, if the child may be born with serious physical or mental defects, or if the fetus was conceived as a result of rape or incest.

== Background ==
Before 1977, abortion in Zimbabwe (then Rhodesia) was governed by the British 1861 Offences Against the Person Act and Roman-Dutch common law, which permitted abortion only to save the life of the pregnant woman. At the time, Bulawayo was the "abortion centre" of Rhodesia, with most abortion procedures being performed by gynaecologists at Bulawayo Central Hospital.

With the advent of the women's liberation movement in Rhodesia in the early 1970s, debate over the country's abortion law increased. In July 1976, the government's Commission of Inquiry into the Termination of Pregnancy in Rhodesia published its recommendations that some restrictions on abortion be loosened. In the report, the commission acknowledged that "perhaps the majority of younger Rhodesians wish to see abortion laws liberalized." The commission's report, and the proposed legislation in Parliament that followed, sparked public debate on what it described as "a key social issue in Rhodesian society." In December 1976, acting on the commission's findings, the Parliament introduced legislation addressing abortion, in what would become the Termination of Pregnancy Act.

== Provisions ==
The Termination of Pregnancy Act (No. 29 of 1977), which took effect on 1 January 1978, was similar to South Africa's now-repealed Abortion and Sterilization Act of 1975. It expanded abortion access, allowing the procedure to be performed under three conditions: if the pregnancy seriously endangers the mother's life or threatens to permanently impair her physical health, if there is a significant risk that the child would be born with serious physical or mental defects, or if the fetus was conceived as a result unlawful intercourse, defined as rape, incest, or intercourse with a mentally handicapped woman (other sexual offenses, like statutory rape, are not legal grounds for an abortion).

An abortion may only be performed by a medical practitioner in an institution designated by the Ministry of Health and Child Care, with the written permission of the hospital superintendent or administrator. In order for the abortion procedure to be performed, two medical practitioners who are not from the same medical partnership or institution must certify that the requisite conditions indeed exist. In cases of unlawful intercourse, (rape, incest, or intercourse with a mentally handicapped woman), a court magistrate of the jurisdiction in which the abortion would take place must issue a certificate certifying that the pregnancy was probably that the result of unlawful intercourse as defined in the Act. Abortion services are provided by the Ministry of Health and Child Care, and are free to low-income and unemployed women.

Illegal abortion carries a penalty of imprisonment up to five years and/or a fine. The Termination of Pregnancy Act set the fine at Z$5,000. However, Zimbabwe no longer uses the Zimbabwean dollar. Under section 60 of the Criminal Law and Codification Reform Act, illegal abortion is punishable by up to five years in prison and/or a fine not exceeding level 10.

== Impact and reception ==
At the time of its passage, although the new law expanded abortion access, it did not go far enough for some: Jacquie Stafford, president of the National Organisation for Women, wrote in a letter to The Rhodesia Herald that the law "showed nothing but contempt for the women of this country, and makes me wonder at the sanity of our parliamentary representatives." While it expanded the circumstances under which legal abortion could be obtained, it also made it difficult to access abortion services by requiring physician's, and in some cases, a magistrate's, approval for the procedure to go forward.

In recent years, there has been growing vocal support to amend the law and expand legal abortion access. Many support expanded legal abortion access in order to end unsafe illegal abortions which often threatens the health of the mother, or results in maternal death. Zimbabwean women are 200 times more likely to die from an abortion procedure than women in South Africa, where obtaining an abortion is easier. And Zimbabwe's maternal mortality rate is three times higher than South Africa. One abortion-rights group active in Zimbabwe is Right Here Right Now (RHRN), which advocates for a review of the Termination of Pregnancy Act, which they consider "archaic". Other calls to amend the law came from the organization Zimbabwe Doctors for Human Rights, as well as former Minister of Finance Tendai Biti.

== See also ==
- Abortion law
- Choice on Termination of Pregnancy Act, 1996
