= Davis Marapira =

Zimbabwean politician

The Hon. Davis Marapira MP

Deputy Minister of Agriculture, Mechanisation and Water Resources Development
- Incumbent
- Assumed office 10 April 2026
- President: Emmerson Mnangagwa
- Minister: Anxious Masuka
- Preceded by: New ministry

Deputy Minister of Lands, Agriculture, Fisheries, Water and Rural Development
- In office 20 April 2021 – 10 April 2026 Serving with Vangelis Haritatos (2021-2026)
- President: Emmerson Mnangagwa
- Minister: Anxious Masuka
- Preceded by: Douglas Karoro
- Succeeded by: Ministry split
- In office 30 November 2017 – 26 August 2018
- President: Emmerson Mnangagwa
- Minister: Perrance Shiri
- Succeeded by: Vangelis Haritatos

Member of Parliament for Masvingo North
- Incumbent
- Assumed office 22 August 2013
- President: Emmerson Mnangagwa
- Preceded by: Isack Stanisalaus Mudenge
- Constituency: Masvingo North
- Majority: 2,547 (12.2%)

Minister of State in the Office of Vice-President Kembo Mohadi
- In office 10 September 2018 – 1 March 2021
- President: Emmerson Mnangagwa
- Vice President: Kembo Mohadi
- Preceded by: Tabitha Kanengoni-Malinga
- Succeeded by: Office abolished

Personal details
- Party: ZANU-PF

Davis Marapira is a Zimbabwean politician. He is the current Deputy Minister of Agriculture, Mechanisation and Water Resources Development and a member of parliament. He is the member of ZANU–PF.
