= Marondera Central =

Goromonzi West
- Constituency for the National Assembly of Zimbabwe
- Province: Mashonaland East
- Region: Marondera

Current constituency
- Created: 2008
- Number of members: 1
- Party: Citizens Coalition for Change
- Member(s): Caston Matewu
- Created from: Marondera East, Marondera West

Marondera Central is a constituency represented in the National Assembly of the Parliament of Zimbabwe, covering much of Marondera, Mashonaland East Province. It was created in 2008 from territory taken from the Marondera East and Marondera West constituencies. Its current MP since the 2018 general election is Caston Matewu of the Citizens Coalition for Change.

== History ==
Marondera Central was created for the 2008 Zimbabwean general election, with territory taken from the Marondera East and Marondera West constituencies. In 2008, Iain Kay of the Movement for Democratic Change – Tsvangirai won the constituency. In 2013, Ray Kaukonde of ZANU–PF was elected. After Kaukonde was expelled from Parliament, the constituency was won by Lawrence Katsiru in a by-election.

Caston Matewu of the MDC Alliance was elected to represent Marondera Central in the 2018 election, winning back the constituency for the opposition. Matewu was recalled in October 2020 by the MDC–T amid factional disputes within the party, but was reelected as MP in a 2022 by-election, representing the newly-formed Citizens Coalition for Change party led by Nelson Chamisa. Matewu was reelected in the 2023 election.

== Demographics ==
Historical population
Year	Pop.	±%
2002	54,600	—
2012	61,998	+13.5%

Marondera Central has a population of 61,998. Of the total, 28,980 are male and 33,018 are female. In 2013, the constituency had 26,888 registered voters with 65% turnout. The population is well educated, compared to the Zimbabwe average. Much of the constituents work in farming, including seasonal employment on commercial farms.

== List of members ==
Election	Name	Party
2008	Iain Kay	MDC–T
2013	Ray Kaukonde	ZANU–PF
2015 by-election	Lawrence Katsiru	ZANU–PF
2018	Caston Matewu	MDC Alliance
2022 by-election	Caston Matewu	CCC
2023	Caston Matewu	CCC

== Election results ==
The following electoral data for Marondera Central comes from the Electoral Resource Centre.

General Election 2008: Marondera Central
Party	Candidate	Votes	%	±%
MDC–T	Iain Kay	8,022	66.28	
ZANU–PF	Peter Murwira	3,170	26.19	
Independent	Others	844	7.53	
Majority		4,852		
Turnout		12,103		

General Election 2013: Marondera Central
Party	Candidate	Votes	%	±%
ZANU–PF	Ray Kaukonde	9,308	52.43	+26.24
MDC–T	Iain Kay	7,892	44.45	−21.83
MDC-M	Mandaza Kudzanai	314	1.77	
Independent	Carlos Mudzongo	112	0.64	−6.89
Majority		1,159		
Turnout		17,754		
ZANU–PF gain from MDC–T		Swing	{{{swing}}}	

By-Election 2015: Marondera Central
Party	Candidate	Votes	%	±%
ZANU–PF	Lawrence Katsiru			
MDC–T	N/A			
Majority				
Turnout				
ZANU–PF hold		Swing		

General Election 2018: Marondera Central
Party	Candidate	Votes	%	±%
MDC Alliance	Caston Matewu	14,604	59.68	
ZANU–PF	Cleopas Kundiona	8,386	34.27	
MDC–T	Francis Makombe	840	3.43	
Majority		6,218		
Turnout		24,469		
MDC Alliance gain from ZANU–PF		Swing	{{{swing}}}	

By-Election 2022: Marondera Central
Party	Candidate	Votes	%	±%
CCC	Caston Matewu	6,756	59.77	+0.09
ZANU–PF	Ignatius Mateveke	4,200	37.16	+2.89
MDC Alliance	Witness Muzavazi	292	2.58	−57.10
Majority		2,556		
Turnout		11,303		
CCC gain from MDC Alliance		Swing	{{{swing}}}	

== See also ==
- List of Zimbabwean parliamentary constituencies
