= David Parirenyatwa =

Zimbabwean politician (born 1950)

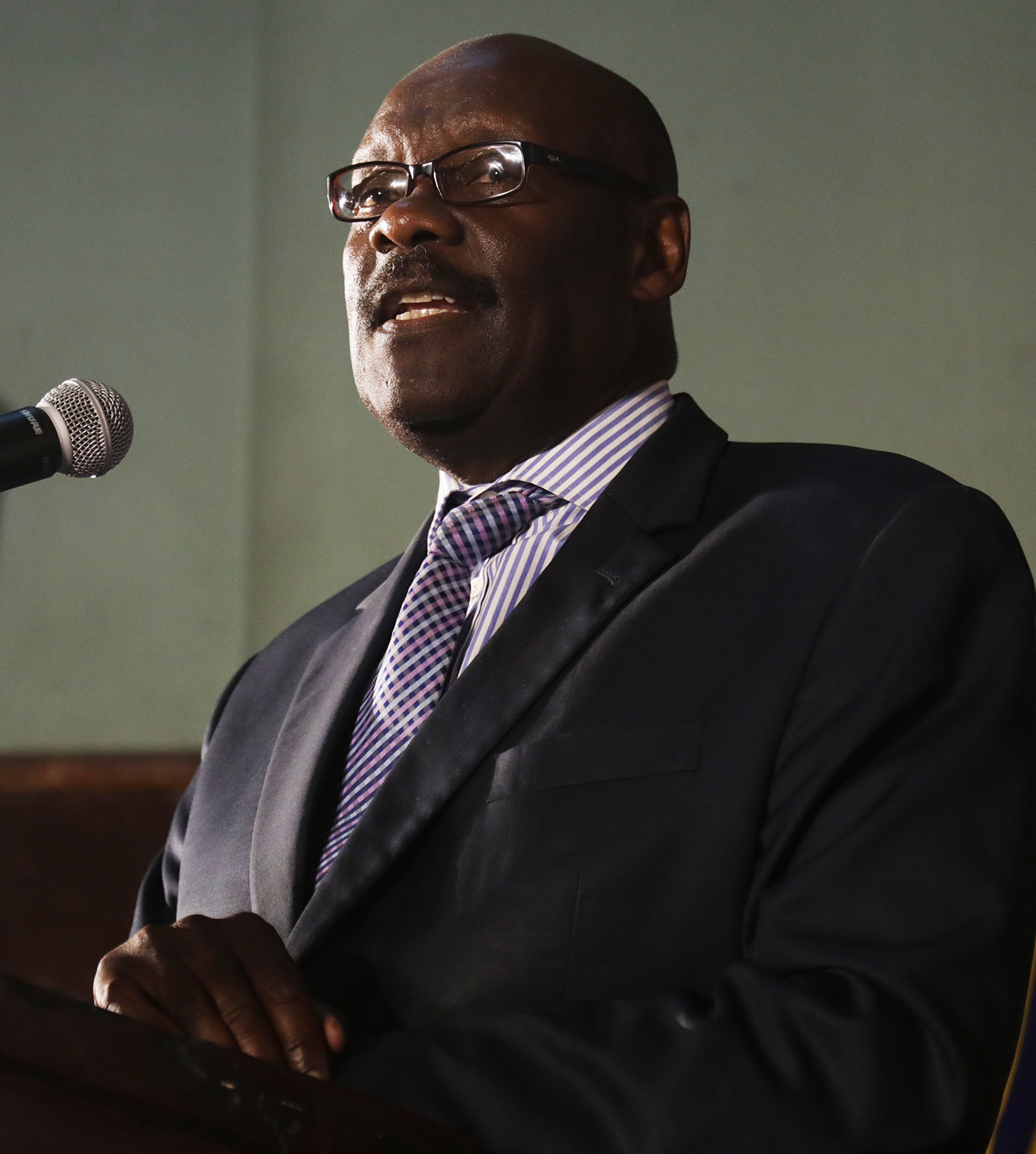
- Parirenyatwa in 2018.

Minister of Health and Child Welfare
- In office 10 September 2013 – 10 September 2018
- President: Robert Mugabe; Emmerson Mnangagwa
- Preceded by: Henry Madzorera
- Succeeded by: Obadiah Moyo
- In office August 2002 – 13 February 2009
- President: Robert Mugabe
- Deputy: Aldrin Masiiwa
- Preceded by: Timothy Stamps
- Succeeded by: Henry Madzorera

Personal details
- Born: 2 August 1950 (age 75) Southern Rhodesia
- Party: ZANU-PF
- Spouse: Choice Parirenyatwa
- Children: Ruvheneko (b. 1988)
- Parent(s): Tichafa Samuel Parirenyatwa; Emely Mkwananzi
- Profession: Medical Doctor

Pagwesese David Parirenyatwa (born August 2, 1950) is a Zimbabwean politician who served in the government of Zimbabwe as Minister of Health from 2013 to 2018. Previously he served as Minister of Health from 2002 to 2009. He is a medical doctor by profession.

== Political career ==
Parirenyatwa served as Deputy Minister of Health and Child Welfare until he was appointed as Minister of Health and Child Welfare in August 2002. He replaced Timothy Stamps, who was ill; Parirenyatwa had already been effectively in charge of the ministry for some time due to Stamps' illness.

Parirenyatwa was put on the United States sanctions list in 2003 for directing the violence against political opponents.

Itai Rusike, Executive Director of the Community Working Group on Health (CWGH), said on June 18, 2007, that the unavailability of drinking water and the contamination of available water had increased the number of citizens at risk for waterborne diseases. Many have already suffered from dysentery. The Public Health Act forbids shutting off water for more than two days. Rusike called on Parirenyatwa to use the Public Health Act to make Munacho Mutezo, the Minister of Water Resources and Infrastructural Development, turn on the tap. "If there is an outbreak of diseases now, it is [Parirenyatwa] who would be blamed."

He warned that cholera and malaria pose a serious threat to Zimbabwe on June 21, 2007.

Parirenyatwa was nominated as ZANU-PF's candidate for the House of Assembly seat from Murehwa North in Mashonaland East in the March 2008 parliamentary election. He won the seat with 7,104 votes against 6,468 for the candidate of the Movement for Democratic Change.

After President Robert Mugabe was re-elected in July 2013, Parirenyatwa was appointed as Minister of Health on 10 September 2013. On Friday 7 September 2018, the current president, Emmerson Mnangagwa, dropped David Parirentatwa from his Cabinet post.

In September 2018, Parirenyatwa was arrested on charges of criminal abuse of office based upon his replacement of NatPharm managing director, Florence Nancy Sifeku with Newman Madzikwa. The prosecutor claimed that this resulted in "double dipping" as he directed the NatPharm Board to issue six months' contracts to both Ms. Sifeku and Mr. Madzikwa as managing directors. The entire NatPharm Board was subsequently replaced by the new Minister of Health, Obadiah Moyo. Parirenyatwa trial was postponed several times; however in April 2021 Parirenyatwa's motion to dismiss for lack of a speedy trial was denied. On 13 May 2021, the trail was again postponed until 26 May, due to the judge's illness. After a lingering illness the presiding judge, Elijah Makomo, died on 22 December 2022.

== Legacy ==
The Parirenyatwa Hospital is named after his father, Tichafa Samuel Parirenyatwa.
