= Jock Kay =

Zimbabwean farmer and politician

The Honourable Jock Kay

Deputy Minister of Lands, Agriculture and Rural Resettlement
- In office 22 January 1988 – March/April 1990
- President: Robert Mugabe
- Minister: David Karimanzira
- Preceded by: Office created

Member of Parliament
- In office October 1983 – 2 May 1990
- Preceded by: Arthur Tapson
- Succeeded by: Constituency abolished
- Constituency: Makoni (White Roll) (1983–1987)

Personal details
- Born: c. 1921 Manicaland, Rhodesia
- Died: Before 2001
- Resting place: Chipesa Farm; Wedza District, Zimbabwe
- Party: Independent Zimbabwe Group (1985–1987); ZANU–PF (from 1987)
- Spouse: Peggy Kay
- Children: Iain Kay

John Maurice Kay (c. 1921 – before 2001), better known as Jock Kay, was a Zimbabwean farmer and politician. A member of the House of Assembly of Zimbabwe from 1983 to 1990, he served as the Deputy Minister of Lands, Agriculture and Rural Resettlement from 1988 to 1990. He entered Parliament as an independent, before joining the ruling ZANU–PF party in 1987.

== Biography ==
Kay was born in Manicaland c. 1921.

In 1948, he purchased 5,000 acres of virgin land in Wedza District, near Marandellas (now Marondera), Southern Rhodesia. He named it Chipesa Farm, and grew maize and tobacco. It supported hundreds of workers and their families. As a farmer, Kay was known as a pioneer of cooperative irrigation techniques.

=== Political career ===
In 1983, Kay ran as an independent candidate for parliament in a by-election for the Makoni white roll constituency. The previous member, Arthur Tapson, resigned to move to South Africa. Makoni, a conservative farming area, was one of 20 seats in parliament reserved for whites per the Lancaster House Agreement. In the election on 30 September, Kay earned 493 votes, defeating the right-wing Republican Front candidate François Smit with 434 votes. Kay's election caused Opposition Leader Ian Smith's conservative Republican Front party to lose its majority of the white roll seats in parliament.

In 1985, he won reelection to parliament in Makoni, this time running as a member of the Independent Zimbabwe Group, a coalition of white moderates. Kay, with 707 votes, defeated Conservative Alliance of Zimbabwe candidate Shelagh Gertrude van Reenen with 658 votes. On 28 July 1987, Kay crossed the aisle to join Prime Minister Robert Mugabe's ruling ZANU–PF party, along with two other white MPs, John Landau and Tony Read. In September 1987, having achieved the support of 75% of the House of Assembly as required under the Lancaster House Agreement, the constitution was amended to abolish the white roll constituencies. A number of new members were co-opted onto the House of Assembly to replace the departing white members. Kay, along with several other white ZANU–PF members, were allowed to keep their seats.

On 22 January 1988, Kay was appointed Deputy Minister of Lands, Agriculture and Rural Resettlement. He was one of two white deputy ministers, along with Charles Duke. His appointment as the deputy of Minister David Karimanzira, because he was a white farmer himself, was thought to help to assuage the concerns of the country's 4,500 white farmers. However, a United States State Department private communication at the time reported that his inexperience and "questionable" professional competence caused some farmers to be uncertain as to whether Kay would be able to protect the interests of white commercial farmers. As deputy minister, Kay focused on promoting irrigation and combating soil loss through erosion.

In the 1990 Zimbabwean general election, Kay did not run for reelection to parliament. Shortly after, he was dropped from the cabinet in a presidential announcement.

== Personal life ==
He was married to Peggy Kay. Their son, Iain, is a farmer and politician who also served in the House of Assembly as a member of the opposition Movement for Democratic Change – Tsvangirai party.

Kay died before 2001. He and his wife are buried on a koppie at their former home, Chipesa Farm, near Marondera, Zimbabwe. In 2000 and again in 2001, farm, then home to Iain Kay and his family, was occupied by war veterans and ZANU–PF supporters. In March 2002, the Kay family abandoned the farm and moved elsewhere. In March 2008, the graves of Jock and Peggy Kay were vandalized by settlers now living at the former Chipesa Farm.

== Electoral history ==
=== 1983 parliamentary by-election ===
1983 by-election, Makoni (white roll)
Candidate	Party	Votes	%
John Maurice Kay	Ind.	493	53.2
François Smit	RF	434	46.8
Total		927	

=== 1985 parliamentary election ===
1985 election, Makoni (white roll)
Candidate	Party	Votes	%
John Maurice Kay	IZG	707	51.8
Shelagh Gertrude van Reenen	CAZ	658	48.2
Total		1,365	
