= Obadiah Moyo =

Zimbabwean politician and hospital administrator

Minister of Health and Child Care
- In office 10 September 2018 – 7 July 2020
- Preceded by: David Parirenyatwa
- Succeeded by: Constantino Chiwenga

Personal details
- Party: ZANU-PF

Obadiah Moyo is a Zimbabwean politician and former hospital administrator. In 2018, he was appointed the country's Minister of Health and Child Care. On 19 June 2020, he was arrested and charged with three counts of criminal abuse of duty as a public officer, for his alleged participation in a scam that involved tens of millions of dollars. After spending the night in police cells, he posted $50,000.00 bail. On 7 July 2020, the President of Zimbabwe, Emmerson Mnangagwa dismissed Moyo from the office of cabinet minister, removing him for "conduct inappropriate for a Government Minister".

== Medical career ==
Moyo served as the Executive Director of The Zimbabwe Kidney Fund Association's Renal Services and worked to bring more dialysis machines to hospitals. Later, Moyo was recognized for his research into kidney transplants vs. dialysis. Moyo was involved in providing dialysis care for Sally Mugabe, Robert Mugabe's first wife, when she battled renal disease.

In 2005, he was appointed as the chief executive officer of Chitungwiza Central Hospital near Harare. He held the position until 2018.

== Political career ==
Moyo is a member of Zanu-PF. He ran for parliament in 2005 as the representative for Nkayi but was not successful. In 2018 he ran again this time in the Zengeza East constituency, but lost the election to Goodrich Chimbaira.

President Emmerson Mnangagwa appointed Moyo as the Minister of Health and Child Care in September 2018, after Moyo's more than a decade at the helm of Chitungwiza Central Hospital. He replaced David Parirenyatwa as Minister. During his first year in the ministerial role, the country faced a cholera outbreak and doctor strikes over hospital conditions, a shortage of drugs and wages. In March 2020, Moyo was appointed to lead the country's Coronavirus Task Force. Moyo's tenure as Zimbabwe's Minister of Health was marred by frequent and persistent complaints that he is an academic imposter; that he faked his medical qualifications; and that he is not, as he claims to be, a medical doctor.

In June 2020, Moyo was arrested for corruption and abuse of office. He was charged with illegally awarding $60 million in contracts, through the Health Ministry without following proper Government procurement procedures and notably without a competitive tender process, to Drax International LLC and Jaji Investments, a Namibian company owned by Dr. Garikai Prince Mushininga, to purchase COVID-19 testing materials and equipment. The contracts were cancelled and Moyo was removed from office on 7 July 2020. Moyo was later freed of the charges in October 2021. In dismissing the case on appeal, the High court cited lack of clarity in the prosecutor's charges.

It also came out in 2020 that Moyo was one of the high-ranking beneficiaries of the RBZ Farm Mechanisation Programme to the tune of US$130,963.00 which was not paid back.

== Personal life ==
Moyo was born in Gutu. As a young man he was known in local pubs as DJ The Mighty Biscuit. He married Lucy Memory. They have four children together. One of them, Ashleigh Moyo, became famous as the musician Shashl.
