= Sleiman Timios Kwidini =

Zimbabwean politician

The Hon. Sleiman Timios Kwidini MP

Deputy Minister of Health and Child Care
- Incumbent
- Assumed office 24 January 2024
- President: Emmerson Mnangagwa
- Minister: Douglas Mombeshora
- Preceded by: John Mangwiro

Member of Parliament for Chiwundura
- Incumbent
- Assumed office 4 September 2023
- President: Emmerson Mnangagwa
- Preceded by: Livingstone Chimina
- Constituency: Chiwundura
- Majority: 3,624 (20.0%)

Personal details
- Party: ZANU-PF

Sleiman Timios Kwidini is a Zimbabwean politician. He is the current Deputy Minister of Health and Child Care of Zimbabwe and a member of parliament for Chiwundura. He is a member of ZANU–PF.
