= Johanna Mafuyana =

Johanna MaFuyana
- Born: September 18, 1927
- Died: June 3, 2003 (aged 75)
- Resting place: National Heroes' Acre
- Spouse: Joshua Nkomo

Johanna MaFuyana Nkomo (September 18, 1927 – June 3, 2003) was a Zimbabwean figure during the country's liberation struggle against colonial rule. She was dubbed as Mama Mafayuna by Zimbabweans.

== Early and personal life ==
MaFuyana was born in Matobo, Matebeleland South to Paul Silwalume Fuyana and Maria Sithunzesibi Mbambo. She was born to a Nguni royalty and was the second eldest among three children. She finished elementary education at St. Joseph's Primary School.

She worked as a matron at Dominican Sister's Convent in Bulawayo, where she eventually met nationalist and late vice president Joshua Nkomo in 1949. They got married within the same year. Their first child died as an infant. They had four children.

== Resistance ==
MaFuyana remained loyal to her husband and raised their family while he was away to fight for the country's independence, even while he was detained. MaFuyana was also involved in the resistance.

MaFuyana was constantly harassed by the reigning colonial system. She was threatened to be arrested many times. One time, a few weeks after giving birth to her youngest child, Sehlule, the Rhodesian Special Branch came to her house to raid. She threw a milk powder tin can to them as an act of self-defense and was detained for it. She was imprisoned at the notorious Gonakudzingwa Restriction Camp.

MaFuyana actively recruited cadres and delivered information from imprisoned nationalists for the resistance. In March 1977, information arrived that colonialists, under the late Prime Minister Ian Smith, were planning to kidnap her youngest child as an act of revenge. She was forced to flee and briefly stayed in England and the German Democratic Republic, which supported Zimbabwe's independence.

MaFuyana actively cooperated with Child Survival and Development Foundation until her death. The foundation is geared towards ensuring the welfare of underprivileged children in Zimbabwe.

== Death ==
MaFuyana complained of stomach pains until she died on June 3, 2003, in Bulawayo. She was 75 years old.

MaFuyana is buried at the National Heroes' Acre in Harare.
