= Shashl =

- Born: Ashleigh Angel Moyo; 25 December 2000 (age 25); Harare, Zimbabwe
- Genres: RnB; Afrobeats
- Occupations: Singer; songwriter; instrumentalist
- Instruments: Guitar; mbira; drums; violin; flute; saxophone; marimba
- Years active: 2017–present
- Label: Universal Music Africa

Ashleigh Angel Moyo (born 25 December 2000), known professionally as Shashl, is a Zimbabwean music artist. She is the first Zimbabwean female musician to be signed under Universal Music Africa.

Shashl was born in Harare, Zimbabwe. She is the daughter of former Zimbabwean health minister Obadiah Moyo. She had her early education at Hellenic Secondary School in Harare.

Shashl began her career in 2017 when she released her debut track titled No More then released her first single project under Universal Music titled Blow It in the Wind. She was nominated for best female Artist in the Southern African region at the 8th African Muzik Magazine Awards (AFRIMMA). She also won Best Newcomer at Zimbabwe Music Awards.

On 14 March 2022, Shashl released her debut 14-track album which was produced by Levels Chillspot named Highway.

== Discography ==
=== Singles ===
- "No More"
- "Blow It in the Wind"
- "Heart 2 Heart"
- "Going Through"
- "Ocean Emotion"
- "Sorry" feat. DJ Tira
- "Ghetto Buddies"
- "Milli"
- "Dhindindi"
- "Manyepo"
- "In My Heart"
- "DEEPISA"
- "Nemoyo"
- "Remedy"
- "Me"
- "shine"
- "Muzerere feat EXQ"
- "kumagumo"

=== Albums ===
Highway (2022)

BUTTERFLIES(2024)

first quarter (2025)
