= Ministry of Lands and Rural Development =

Government ministry of Zimbabwe

Ministry overview
- Formed: 10 April 2026
- Preceding Ministry: Ministry of Lands, Agriculture, Fisheries, Water and Rural Development
- Jurisdiction: Government of Zimbabwe
- Headquarters: 1 Liberation Legacy Way, Ngungunyana Building, Harare; 17.807810108609356°S 31.058166144435543°E
- Minister responsible: Vangelis Haritatos, Minister of Lands and Rural Development
- Deputy Minister responsible: Tsitsi Zhou, Deputy Minister of Lands and Rural Development
- Ministry executive: Prosper Bvumiranayi Matondi, Permanent Secretary
- Website: agric.gov.zw

The Ministry of Lands and Rural Development is a government ministry responsible for lands and rural development in Zimbabwe, including the management of land use. Vangelis Haritatos is the incumbent Minister, having been appointed on 10 April 2026 when the Ministry was split from the Ministry of Lands, Agriculture, Fisheries, Water and Rural Development. The ministry is located in Harare.

== See also ==
- Ministry of Agriculture, Mechanisation and Water Resources Development
