= Joseph Made =

Zimbabwean politician

The Right Honourable Joseph Mtakwese Made

Minister of Agriculture of Zimbabwe
- In office 13 February 2009 – 27 November 2017
- Deputy: Roy Bennett
- Preceded by: Sylvester Nguni (Acting)

Personal details
- Born: 21 November 1954 (age 71) Zimbabwe
- Party: Zimbabwe African National Union-Patriotic Front

Joseph Mtakwese Made was a Zimbabwean politician who served as Minister of Agriculture.

== Political career ==
He was the Minister of Agriculture before being moved to the position of Minister of Agriculture Mechanization, with Rugare Gumbo replacing him as Minister of Agriculture. Made has been accused of overseeing the destruction of the agricultural sector in Zimbabwe when he was minister. Made also generated controversy blocking U.S. food aid to Zimbabwe during drought-induced food shortages citing concerns over genetically modified crops and the need to maintain a multi-million-dollar organic beef export agreement with Russia.

Made was nominated as ZANU-PF's candidate for the House of Assembly seat from Makoni West, a constituency in Manicaland, in the March 2008 parliamentary election. He was defeated by Webber Chinyadza of the Movement for Democratic Change, receiving 2,585 votes against 6,187 for Chinyadza.

When the national unity government was sworn in on 13 February 2009, Made became Minister of Agriculture again. He was placed on the European Union and United States sanctions lists in 2003. In 2009 the Canadian Parliament passed a law sanctioning the Zimbabwe government for corruption practices and restricted Canadian citizens and charities from engaging in economic activities with specific named members of the government, including Joseph Made.

It was announced on 27 November 2017 that Emmerson Mnangagwa, who succeeded Robert Mugabe as President of Zimbabwe following the 2017 Zimbabwean coup d'état, had dissolved the Cabinet of Zimbabwe and allowed only Patrick Chinamasa and Simbarashe Mumbengegwi to remain as acting ministers of Finance and Foreign Affairs respectively until the appointment of a new cabinet.
