= Joshua Nkomo =

Zimbabwean politician (1917–1999)

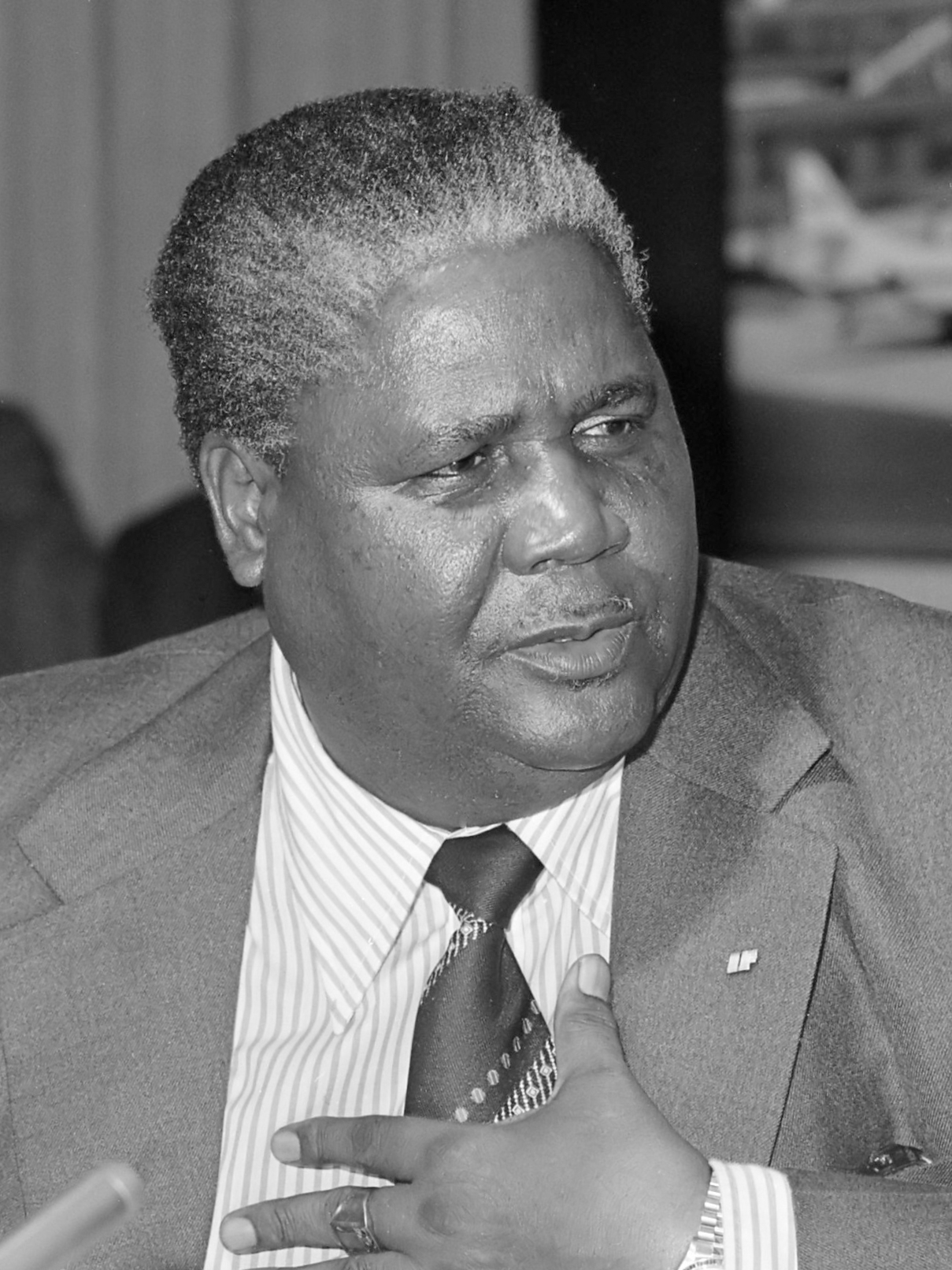
- Nkomo in 1978

1st Second Vice-President of Zimbabwe
- In office 6 August 1990 – 1 July 1999 Serving with Simon Muzenda
- President: Robert Mugabe
- Preceded by: Office established
- Succeeded by: Joseph Msika

1st Minister of Home Affairs of Zimbabwe
- In office 1980 – February 1982
- President: Canaan Banana
- Prime Minister: Robert Mugabe
- Preceded by: Herbert Zimuto (Zimbabwe Rhodesia)
- Succeeded by: Herbert Ushewokunze

Personal details
- Born: Joshua Mqabuko Nyongolo Nkomo; 7 June 1917 Matopos, Southern Rhodesia (now Matobo, Zimbabwe)
- Died: 1 July 1999 (aged 82) Harare, Zimbabwe
- Resting place: National Heroes' Acre
- Party: PF-ZAPU; ZAPU
- Spouse: Johanna Fuyana (m. 1949)
- Children: 4
- Education: Jan H. Hofmeyr School of Social Work; University of South Africa (BA)
- Profession: Politician, guerrilla leader, trade unionist, businessman

Joshua Mqabuko Nyongolo Nkomo (7 June 1917 – 1 July 1999) was a Zimbabwean revolutionary and socialist politician who served as Vice-President of Zimbabwe under Robert Mugabe from 1990 until his death in 1999. He founded and led the Zimbabwe African People's Union (ZAPU) from 1961 until, after an internal military crackdown (known as Gukurahundi) in western Zimbabwe (mostly targeting ethnic Ndebele ZAPU supporters), ZAPU merged in 1987 with Robert Mugabe's Zimbabwe African National Union (ZANU) to form ZANU–PF.

He was a leading trade union leader, who progressed on to become president of the banned National Democratic Party, and was jailed for ten years by Rhodesia's white minority government. After his release in 1974, ZAPU contributed to the fall of that government, along with the splinter rival ZANU, created in 1963.

In 1983, fearing for his life in the early stages of the Gukurahundi, Nkomo fled the country. Later in 1987, he controversially signed the Unity Accord allowing ZAPU to merge with ZANU to stop the genocide.

Nkomo earned many nicknames, including Umafukufuku in Ndebele, "Father Zimbabwe" in English, and Chibwechitedza ("the slippery rock") in Shona.

== Early life ==
Nkomo was born on 7 June 1917 in Matopos, Matabeleland, Southern Rhodesia (now Matobo, Zimbabwe) to a poor Ndebele family. He was one of eight children. His father (Thomas Nyongolo Letswansto Nkomo) worked as a preacher and a cattle rancher and worked for the London Missionary Society. His mother was Mlingo Hadebe.

After completing his primary education in Southern Rhodesia, Nkomo took a carpentry course at the Tsholotsho Government Industrial School and studied there for a year before becoming a driver. He later tried animal husbandry, then became a schoolteacher specialising in carpentry at Manyame School in Kezi. In 1942, at the age of 25, during his career as a teacher, he decided that he should go to South Africa to further his education, do carpentry and qualify to a higher level. He attended Adams College and the Jan H. Hofmeyr School of Social Work in South Africa, where he met Nelson Mandela and other future nationalist leaders at the University of Fort Hare, although he did not attend that university. It was at the Jan Hofmeyr School of Social Work that he was awarded a diploma in social work in 1952. Nkomo married his wife Johanna Fuyana on 1 October 1949.

== Politics 1947–1964 ==
After returning to Bulawayo in 1947, he became a trade unionist for black railway workers and rose to the leadership of the Railway Workers Union and then to leadership of the Southern Rhodesian chapter of the African National Congress. In 1953 he ran for Parliament in the first federal election, although he lost. The Southern Rhodesian ANC branch became the Southern Rhodesia African National Congress (SRANC), and in 1957 Nkomo was elected chairman. Nkomo was out of the country in 1959 when SRANC was banned, its property confiscated, and many of its leaders arrested.

On 1 January 1960, the National Democratic Party (NDP) was founded by Nkomo and others from the SRANC leadership to succeed the banned SRANC, and adopted their goals and organizational structure, as well as subsuming their membership. That year he became president of the NDP with the support of Robert Mugabe. The NDP was banned in December 1961 by the Rhodesian government.

Nkomo immediately formed the Zimbabwe African Peoples Union (ZAPU) together with Samuel Parirenyatwa, Ndabaningi Sithole, Robert Mugabe, and others. That party was also banned by the Rhodesian white minority government nine months later in September 1962.

ZAPU split in 1963 with Sithole and Mugabe taking their supporters and forming the Zimbabwe African National Union (ZANU). While some have claimed this split was due to ethnic tensions, more accurately the split was motivated by the failure of Sithole, Mugabe, Takawira and Malianga to wrest control of ZAPU from Nkomo. ZAPU would remain a multi-ethnic party right up until independence.

== Armed struggle ==
Nkomo was detained at Gonakudzingwa Restriction Camp by Ian Smith's government in 1964, with fellow outlaw rebels Ndabaningi Sithole, Edgar Tekere, Enos Nkala, Maurice Nyagumbo, and Mugabe, until 1974. Paul Tangi Mhova Mkondo a student youth leader was also detained with them for some time. A large number of them were released due to pressure from South African Prime Minister John Vorster. Following Nkomo's release, he went to Zambia to continue opposing the Rhodesian government through the dual processes of armed resistance and negotiation.

Unlike ZANU's armed wing – the Zimbabwe African National Liberation Army, ZAPU's armed wing – the Zimbabwe People's Revolutionary Army – was dedicated to both guerrilla warfare and conventional warfare. At the time of independence ZIPRA had a modern military, stationed in Zambia and Angola, consisting of Soviet-made Mikoyan fighters, tanks and armoured personnel carriers, as well as well trained artillery units.

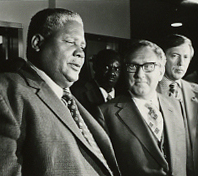
Joshua Nkomo meeting with U.S. Secretary of State Henry Kissinger in Zambia in 1976

Nkomo was the target of two attempted assassinations. The first one, in Zambia, by the Selous Scouts, was a false flag operation. The mission was ultimately aborted and attempted later, unsuccessfully, by the Rhodesian Special Air Service (SAS). In August 2011 it was reported by the BBC that Nkomo had been tipped off by the British government.

ZAPU forces strategically weakened the Rhodesian government during the Bush War. The most widely reported and possibly the most effective of these attacks were the downing of two Air Rhodesia Vickers Viscount civilian passenger planes with surface-to-air missiles, resulting in the deaths of 107 people in total. The first, on 3 September 1978, killed 38 out of 56 in the crash with a further ten survivors (including women and children) shot dead by ZIPRA cadres sent to inspect the burnt wreckage.

Nkomo later dismissed the massacre as false allegations perpetrated by the Rhodesian media and expressed his regret at the downing of a civilian plane, but defended the act by stating the Rhodesian government was known to transport military personnel aboard civilian liners. The eight remaining survivors eluded the guerrillas by hiding overnight in the bush; some walked towards Karoi to seek help. Some of the passengers had serious injuries and they were picked up by local police and debriefed by the Rhodesian army.

The second shooting down, on 12 February 1979, killed all 59 on board. The target of the second attack was reportedly General Peter Walls, head of the COMOPS (Commander, Combined Operations), in charge of the Special Forces, including the RSAS and the Selous Scouts. Due to the large number of tourists returning to Salisbury a second flight had been dispatched. General Walls received a boarding card for the second flight, which departed Kariba 15 minutes after the doomed aircraft.

No one was ever brought to trial or charged with shooting down the aircraft due to amnesty laws passed by both Smith and Mugabe. In a television interview not long after the attack on the first aircraft, Nkomo joked about the incident while admitting ZAPU had indeed been responsible. In his memoir, Story of My Life, published in 1984, Nkomo wrote, "during that interview, the interviewee had asked about what we used to down the planes and I said stones, jokingly in an attempt to avoid answering the question due to military intelligence which demanded secrecy regarding what type of weapons we had acquired from the Soviet Union. They remembered the laugh and not the regret for the shooting down of both aircraft."

== Politics 1980–1999 ==
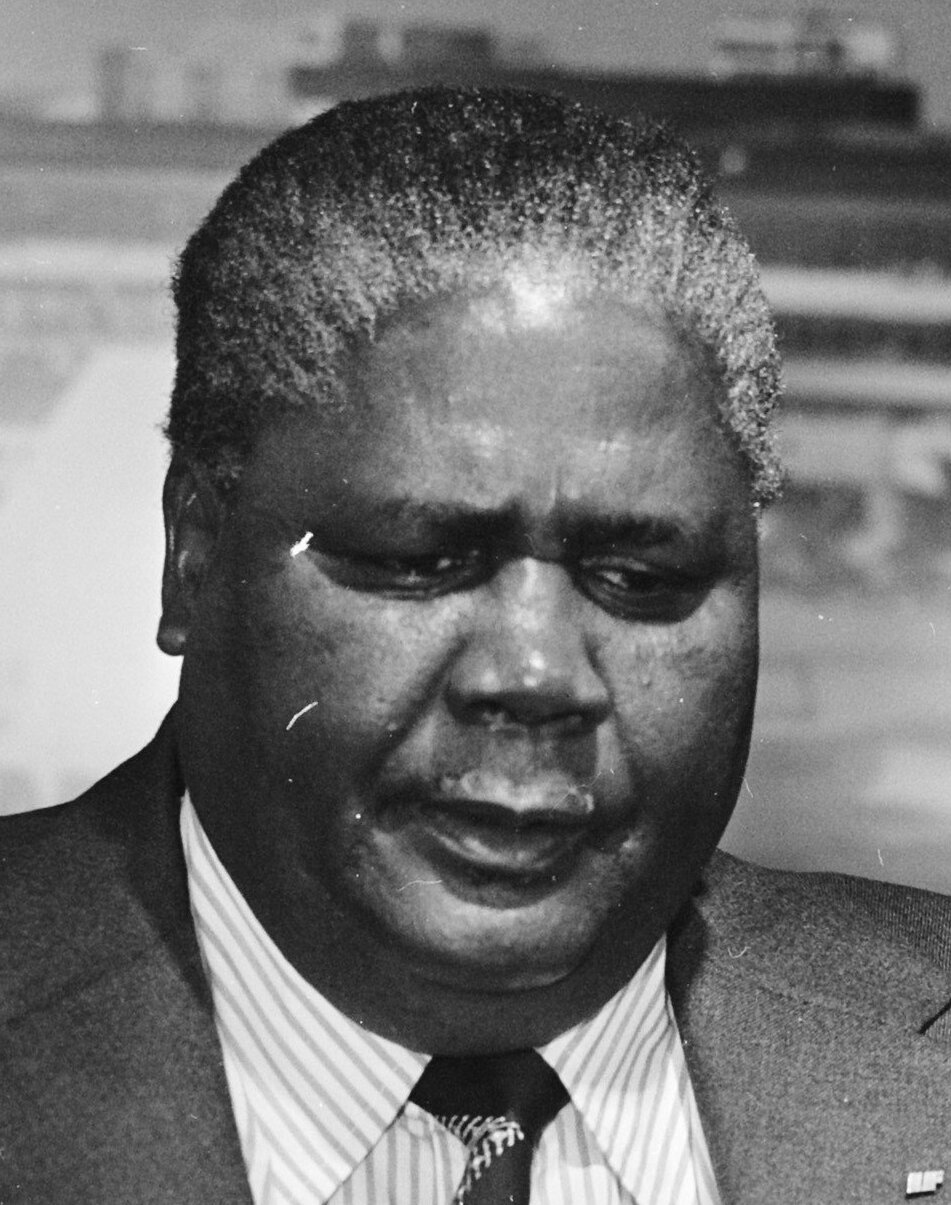
Nkomo, 1978.

Following the first majority-rule election in Zimbabwe-Rhodesia in which around 60% of the population voted, a government led by Abel Muzorewa, was formed in 1979 between Ian Smith and Ndabaningi Sithole's ZANU Mwenje, which by now had also split from Mugabe's more militant ZANU faction. The civil war waged by Nkomo and Mugabe continued unabated and Britain and the USA did not lift sanctions on the country. Britain persuaded all parties to come to Lancaster House in September 1979 to work out a constitution and the basis for fresh elections. Mugabe and Nkomo shared a delegation, called the Patriotic Front (PF), at the negotiations chaired by Lord Carrington.

Nkomo proposed to address Zimbabwe-Rhodesia's land question with Georgist principles of collecting ground rent but leaving improvements to those who built them.

We don't believe in trading land or selling land – no. And in any government that I lead, you can be certain those practices must go. That does not mean we will be taking people's land. It means that other people who haven't got money will have a chance to use land, which is the common property of everybody. And if they have to pay some rates or rents, that will go to a general fund of the people. In this way citizens can use as much land as they want. Our system is this: once you use land, that land belongs to you. But you have not bought it. You cannot sell it to some one. The land belongs to the people, but everything on that land is yours.

Elections were held in 1980 and to the surprise of Nkomo but few others, the Common Roll vote split on predictable tribal lines, with the 20 seats in Matabeleland going to ZAPU (listed as "PF–ZAPU") and all but three of the sixty in predominantly Shona areas falling to Mugabe's ZANU–PF. Nkomo was offered the ceremonial post of President, but declined, instead being appointed Minister of Home Affairs.

=== Conflict with Mugabe ===
Despite reaching their ultimate goal, ousting Smith's minority government, Nkomo could not reconcile his differences with Mugabe.

Ideological differences kept the two men apart as Mugabe's Communist clashed with Nkomo's Socialist reformism. Nkomo's ethnic background was also grounds for distrust by Mugabe who constantly feared an uprising by the historically turbulent Ndebele population. Nkomo would make concessions and attempts to improve relationships but met with varying results, the most successful being the ones where Sally Hayfron would intervene, as she was the only person within Mugabe's party who was supportive of Nkomo.

Initially, Mugabe refused to give Nkomo the position of Minister of Defence which Nkomo had been hoping for. After the intervention of Sally Hayfron, Nkomo was appointed to the cabinet (as minister without portfolio), but in 1982 was accused of plotting a coup d'état after South African double agents in Zimbabwe's Central Intelligence Organization, attempting to cause distrust between ZAPU and ZANU, planted arms on ZAPU owned farms and then tipped Mugabe off to their existence.

In a public statement Mugabe said, "ZAPU and its leader, Dr. Joshua Nkomo, are like a cobra in a house. The only way to deal effectively with a snake is to strike and destroy its head." He unleashed the Fifth Brigade upon Nkomo's Matabeleland homeland in Operation Gukurahundi, killing up to 20,000 Ndebele civilians in an attempt to destroy ZAPU and create a one-party state. Nkomo fled the country. Mugabe's government claimed that he had "illegally" left dressed as a woman:

NKOMO FLEES: ZAPU leader, Joshua Nkomo, fled in self-imposed exile to London after illegally crossing the Botswana frontier disguised as a woman on 7 March. 1983, claiming that his life was in danger and that he was going to look for "solutions" to Zimbabwean problems abroad.

— Government Printer, Harare 1984.

Nkomo ridiculed the suggestion that he escaped dressed as a woman. "I expected they would invent stupid stories about my flight.... People will believe anything if they believe that". He added that "nothing in my life had prepared me for persecution at the hands of a government led by black Africans."

After the Gukurahundi massacres, in 1987 Nkomo consented to the absorption of ZAPU into ZANU, resulting in a unified party called ZANU-PF, leaving Zimbabwe as effectively a one-party state and leading some Ndebeles to accuse Nkomo of selling out. These Ndebele individuals were in such a minority that they did not constitute a meaningful power base within ZAPU. As part of the deal, Nkomo became vice-president when the constitution was amended to create a second vice-president in 1990. He was sworn in as vice-president on 6 August 1990. In practice, the post was almost powerless. With his health failing, his influence declined.

When asked late in his life why he allowed this to happen, he told historian Eliakim Sibanda that he did it to stop the murder of the Ndebele (who supported his party) and of the ZAPU politicians and organizers who had been targeted by Zimbabwe's security forces since 1982. "Mugabe and his Shona henchmen have always sought the extermination of the Ndebele," he said.

== Personal life ==
=== Family ===
Nkomo married his wife Johanna in 1949. They had four children: Thandiwe Nkomo, Ernest Thutani, Michael Sibangilizwe, and Louise Sehlule

=== Religion ===
Nkomo had a Presbyterian Church of Southern Africa chaplain in his militia days, and was ordained a Methodist lay preacher. Described as "not an ardent churchgoer" in 1962, he returned to preaching in retirement. He proclaimed respect for traditional African religions and made use of their ceremonies and symbolism in his political campaigning. In his last years he converted to Roman Catholicism.

=== Death ===
Nkomo died of prostate cancer on 1 July 1999 at the age of 82 in Parirenyatwa Hospital in Harare.

== Legacy and honours ==
Letters to the prime minister, Robert Mugabe, allegedly written by Nkomo while in exile in the United Kingdom, began to resurface following Nkomo's death in 1999. In the letters he argues against his persecution and accused the government of cracking down on opposition.

In 1999, Nkomo was declared a National Hero and is buried in the National Heroes' Acre in Harare.

On 27 June 2000, a set of four postage stamps were issued by the Post and Telecommunications Corporation of Zimbabwe featuring Joshua Nkomo. They had denominations of ZW$2.00, $9.10, $12.00 and $16.00.

== Notes and references ==
=== Works cited ===
- Ndlovu-Gatsheni, Sabelo J. (2017). Joshua Mqabuko Nkomo of Zimbabwe:Politics, Power, and Memory. Cham, Switzerland: Palgrave Macmillan. ISBN 978-3-319-60555-5.
- Sibanda, Eliakim M. (2005) The Zimbabwe African People's Union 1961–87: A Political History of Insurgency in Southern Rhodesia. Trenton, NJ: Africa World Press. ISBN 978-1-59221-275-0
