= St Francis Hospital (Bulawayo) =

St Francis HospitalSt Francis Hospital

Geography
- Location: Bulawayo, Zimbabwe
- Coordinates: 20°10′12″S 28°34′48″E

Organisation
- Type: District General hospital

Links
- Other links: List of hospitals in Zimbabwe

St Francis Hospital (Bulawayo) is a public health institution that provides health services to the community of Zimbabwe in the second largest capital city Bulawayo, in Matebeleland.

== See also ==
- List of hospitals in Zimbabwe
