= Karanda Mission Hospital =

- The Evangelical Alliance Mission
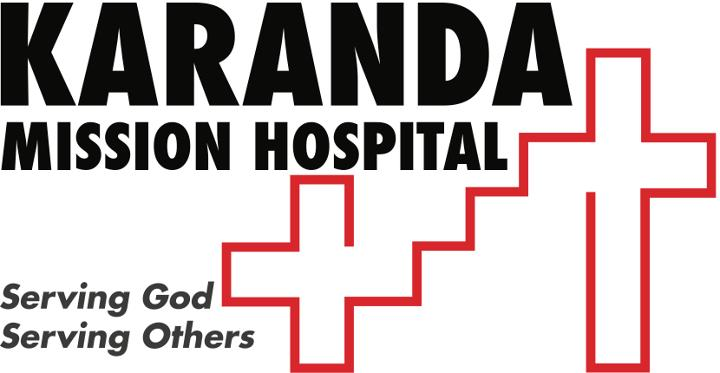

Geography
- Location: Karanda, Zimbabwe

Organisation
- Care system: Private
- Type: Mission hospital

Services
- Beds: 130

History
- Opened: 1961

Links
- Website: http://www.karanda.org
- Lists: Hospitals in Zimbabwe
- Other links: Mission Hospital

Coordinates: 18°56′S 28°27′E

Karanda Mission Hospital was established in 1961 to meet the needs of mission stations in the Zambezi River valley which were established as churches and then, as the abundant health care challenges were seen, small dispensaries/clinics were developed along with the churches (then came schools). To help the clinics, the hospital was built. Karanda is in a remote area of northern Zimbabwe nearest to Mount Darwin. Its location is approximately 200 kilometres (120 mi) from the capital, Harare.

The mission complex has a nurse training school for around 55 students and a primary school offering grades 1-7 for children of the hospital staff. The hospital also offers a home-based care program that works with the Evangelical church, a non-denominational church very similar in doctrine to the Evangelical Free church in the US.

The hospital is licensed for 150 beds and on an average work day sees between 10–20 surgeries and 200–300 outpatients. The hospital's inpatient capacity is 90% full most of the time. The facility is known for the large number of surgical cases it handles as well as treating HIV/AIDS, tuberculosis, obstetrics, and hydrocephalus.

== Ministries ==
- Hospital
- Nursing School
- Elementary School
- Evangelical Church
- Community Outreach Programs

== Photos ==
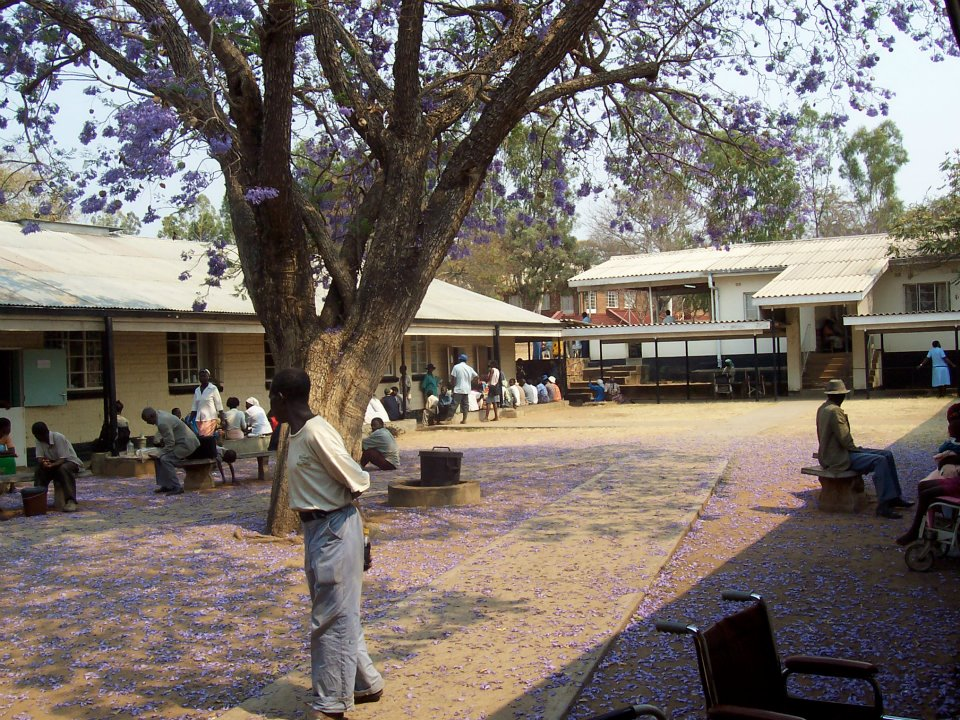
The central courtyard at Karanda

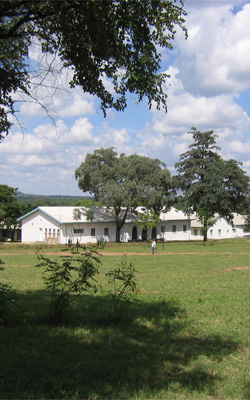
The nursing school

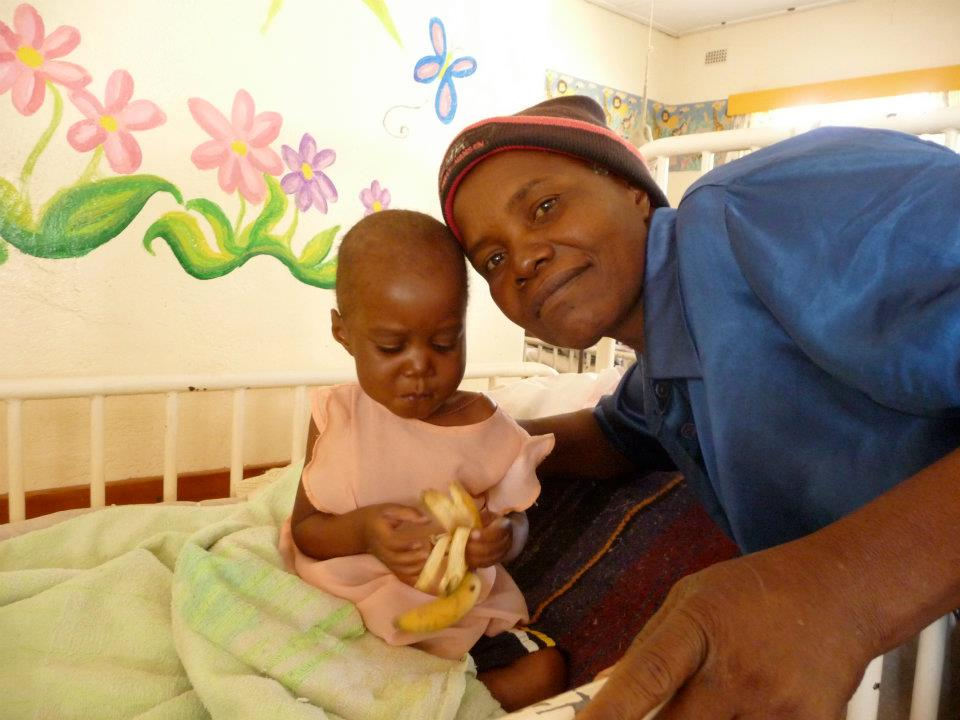
A mother and child at Karanda

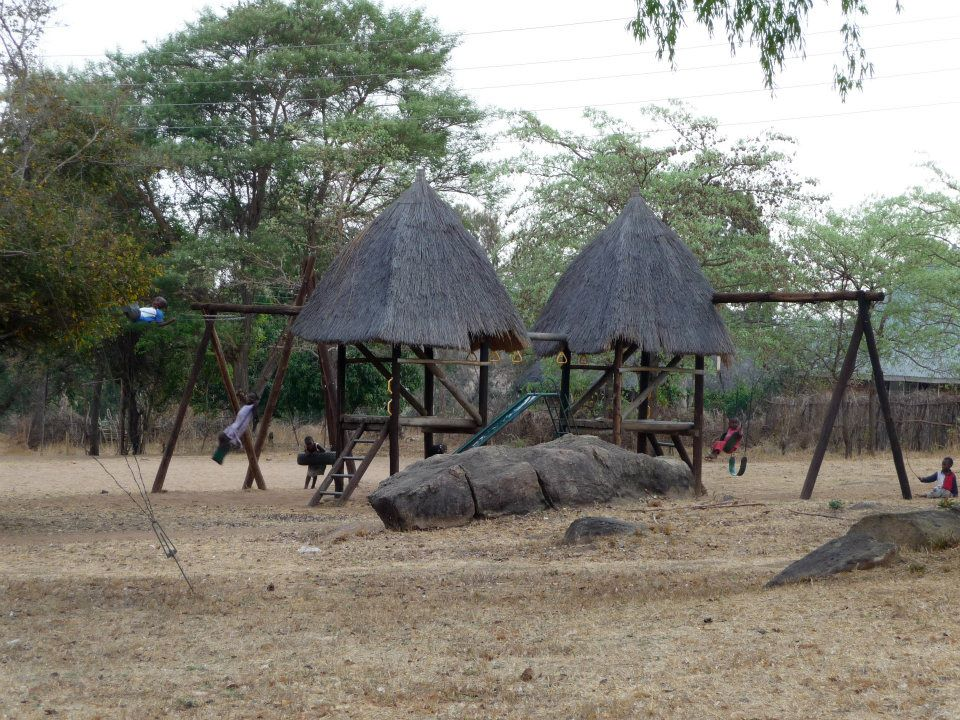
The playground for children at Karanda
