= Anxious Masuka =

Zimbabwean politician

The Honourable Dr. Anxious Masuka
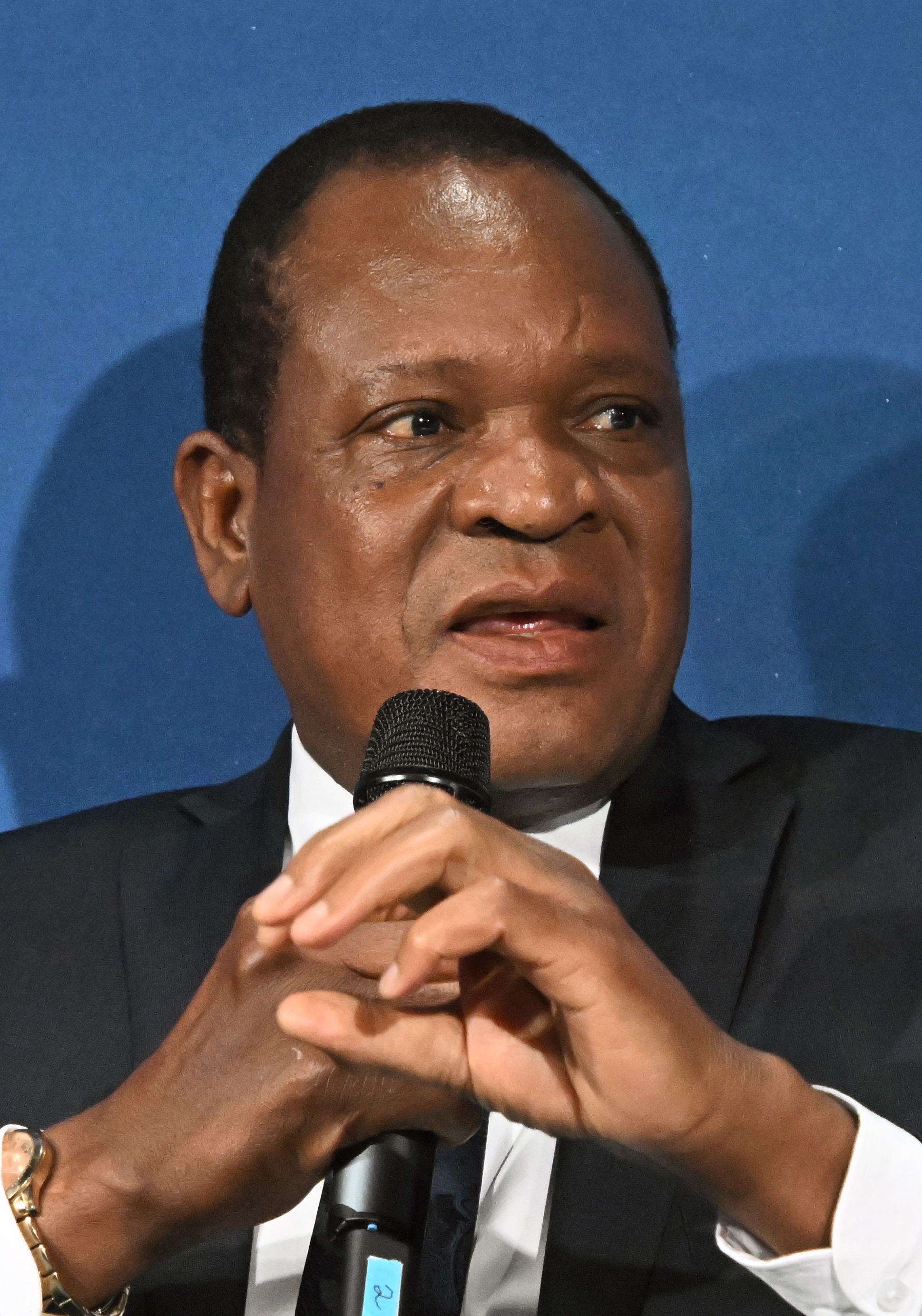
- Masuka in 2024

Minister of Agriculture, Mechanisation and Water Resources Development
- Incumbent
- Assumed office 10 April 2026
- President: Emmerson Mnangagwa
- Deputy: Davis Marapira
- Preceded by: New Ministry

Minister of Lands, Agriculture, Fisheries, Water and Rural Development
- In office 14 August 2020 – 10 April 2026
- President: Emmerson Mnangagwa
- Deputy: Douglas Karoro (2020-2022); Vangelis Peter Haritatos; Davis Marapira
- Preceded by: Perrance Shiri
- Succeeded by: Ministry split

Personal details
- Education: University of Zimbabwe

Anxious Jongwe Masuka is a Zimbabwean politician and member of the Emmerson Mnangagwa cabinet. He was appointed to oversee the Ministry of Lands, Agriculture, Water and Rural Resettlement in August 2020 after the previous minister Perrance Shiri died.

Prior to entering politics, Masuka worked as the chief executive officer of the Zimbabwe Agricultural Society. Masuka has also worked as a lecturer at the University of Zimbabwe, at Zimbabwe's Forestry Commission and the Tobacco Research Board, where he was the general manager.
