= Wilkins Infectious Diseases Hospital =

Geography
- Location: 52JH+4V9, Princes Rd, Harare, Zimbabwe
- Coordinates: 17°49′11″S 31°01′47″E

Organisation
- Care system: City Council
- Affiliated university: Ministry of Health and Child Care (Zimbabwe)

History
- Founded: Renamed in April 1956

Wilkins Infectious Diseases Hospital is Zimbabwe's main hospital for treating and testing infectious diseases caused by bacteria, viruses, fungi or parasites. The hospital is the main isolation and treatment center as well as the main vaccination center for COVID-19 in Zimbabwe.

Wilkins Infectious Diseases Hospital was renamed from The European Infectious Diseases Hospital on Saturday 21 April 1956 as a tribute to Dr A.J Walker Wilkins, who was an outstanding Medical Officer of Health in Southern Africa at that time.

In 2020 the hospital was said to be incapacitated to handle coronavirus patients fully after death of media personality Zororo Makamba, the son of James Makamba and he was the first coronavirus patient to be officially recorded in the country. The family revealed that the main center did not have ventilators, power sockets, had limited oxygen and had no medicines. There was speculation opposition members who claimed the ruling party wanted to renovate the place for the use of the political elite and other VIP patients. However the hospital received donations worth US$500,000 from the Chinese business community based in Zimbabwe and Chinese Embassy in Zimbabwe for upgrading its facilities.
