= Ingutsheni Hospital =

Geography
- Location: Bulawayo, 11 23Rd Avenue Belmont, Matebeleland, Zimbabwe
- Coordinates: 20°10′12″S 28°34′48″E

Organisation
- Type: Public

Services
- Emergency department: Yes

Helipads
- Helipad: No

History
- Founded: 1908

Links
- Other links: List of hospitals in Zimbabwe

Ingutsheni Hospital is a public hospital located in Belmont east, Bulawayo, Zimbabwe. It is the largest psychiatric hospital in Zimbabwe, with over 700 beds.

== History ==
Ingutsheni is a government referral hospital located in the second largest capital city of Zimbabwe, Bulawayo. It was established in 1908, as the hospital for refugees and was meant to serve black people in Zimbabwe only. The white people were also assisted on temporary basis and were deported or taken to South Africa after being attributed to lunacy. Ingutsheni hospital specialises in providing psychiatric care to the community members in Zimbabwe. The hospital was converted to a psychiatrist hospital in 1933.

== See also ==
List of hospitals in Zimbabwe
