= Tsitsi Zhou =

Zimbabwean politician

The Hon. Tsitsi Zhou MP

Deputy Minister of Lands and Rural Development
- Incumbent
- Assumed office 1 May 2026
- President: Emmerson Mnangagwa
- Minister: Vangelis Haritatos
- Preceded by: New ministry

Member of Parliament for Midlands Women's Quota
- Incumbent
- Assumed office 4 September 2023
- President: Emmerson Mnangagwa

Personal details
- Party: ZANU-PF

Tsitsi Zhou is a Zimbabwean politician. She is the current Deputy Minister of Lands and Rural Development of Zimbabwe and a member of parliament for the Midlands Women's Quota. She is a member of ZANU–PF.
