= Ministry of Agriculture, Mechanisation and Water Resources Development =

Government ministry of Zimbabwe

Ministry overview
- Formed: 10 April 2026
- Preceding agencies: Ministry of Agriculture; Ministry of Lands, Agriculture, Water, Climate and Rural Resettlement; Ministry of Lands, Agriculture, Fisheries, Water and Rural Development
- Jurisdiction: Government of Zimbabwe
- Headquarters: 1 Liberation Legacy Way, Ngungunyana Building, Harare; 17.807810108609356°S 31.058166144435543°E
- Minister responsible: Anxious Masuka, Minister of Agriculture, Mechanisation and Water Resources Development
- Deputy Minister responsible: Davis Marapira, Deputy Minister of Lands, Agriculture, Fisheries, Water and Rural Development
- Ministry executive: Obert Jiri, Permanent Secretary
- Child agencies: Veterinary Technical Services; AGRITEX; Department of Research and Specialist Services
- Website: agric.gov.zw

The Ministry of Agriculture, Mechanisation and Water Resources Development, also known as the Ministry of Agriculture, is a government ministry responsible for agriculture in Zimbabwe, including the management of agricultural land use, but not land reform. Dr Anxious Masuka is the incumbent Minister of Agriculture, Mechanisation and Water Resources Development, having been appointed on 14 August 2020 as Minister of Lands, Agriculture, Fisheries, Water and Rural Development. In April 2026, the Ministry was split into two ministries: that of Agriculture, Mechanisation and Water Resources Development, and the Ministry of Lands and Rural Development. Currently, the deputy minister is Davis Marapira. The ministry is located in Harare.

The ministry oversees:

- Veterinary Technical Services
- AGRITEX
- Department of Research and Specialist Services

== State corporations ==
State corporations under the direction of the Ministry of Agriculture include:

- Agricultural Bank of Zimbabwe (AGRIBANK)
- Tobacco Industry and Marketing Board (TIMB)
- Pig Industry Board (PIB)
- Agricultural Rural Development Authority(ARDA)
- Grain Marketing Board (GMB)
- Tobacco Research Board (TRB)
- Cold Storage Commission (CSC)

== Ministers of Agriculture ==
Minister	Start of term	End of term
Denis Norman	May 1980	July 1985
Moven Mahachi	1985	1988
David Karimanzira	1987/1988	1990
Witness Mangwende	1 January 1991	22 December 1994
Kumbirai Kangai	1994	2000
Joseph Made	2000	2007
Rugare Gumbo	2007	2009
Sylvester Nguni (acting)	2009	2009
Joseph Made	13 February 2009	27 November 2017
Perrance Shiri	30 November 2017	27 July 2020
Anxious Jongwe Masuka	14 August 2020	Incumbent

== Deputy Ministers of Agriculture ==
- Simba Makoni (May 1980 – January 1981)
- Jock Kay (22 January 1988 – March/April 1990)
- Sylvester Nguni (c. 2006)
- Seiso Moyo (11 October 2011 – 21 December 2012)
- Paddy Zhanda (10 October 2013 - ?)
- Davis Marapira (30 November 2017 - 2018)
- Douglas Karoro (2018–2 June 2022)
- Vangelis Haritatos (2018–2026)
- Davis Marapira (2022-present)

== See also ==
- Ministry of Lands and Rural Development
