= Zambezia (journal) =

- Discipline: Humanities
- Language: English

Publication details
- History: 1969-2005
- Publisher: University of Zimbabwe (Zimbabwe)
- Frequency: Biannual

Standard abbreviations
- ISO 4: Zambezia

Indexing
- ISSN: 0379-0622
- OCLC no.: 1785804

Links
- Journal homepage; Online access

Zambezia: The Journal of Humanities of the University of Zimbabwe is a biannual academic journal in the Humanities published by the University of Zimbabwe Press from 1969 to date. The journal specializes in humanities in Zimbabwe and other African countries in the surrounding region, but also included other topics of general interest.
