= Henry Madzorera =

Zimbabwean politician

The Right Honourable Henry Madzorera

Minister of Health and Child Welfare of Zimbabwe
- In office 13 February 2009 – 11 September 2013
- Prime Minister: Morgan Tsvangirai
- Preceded by: David Parirenyatwa
- Succeeded by: David Parirenyatwa

Personal details
- Party: Movement for Democratic Change-Tsvangirai

Henry Madzorera is a Zimbabwean politician who was Minister of Health and Child Welfare from 2009 to 2013. A member of the MDC-T, he has also served as the Senator for Kwekwe.
