= Perrance Shiri =

Zimbabwean air officer (1955–2020)

- Shiri in 2014

Minister of Lands, Agriculture and Rural Resettlement
- In office 30 November 2017 – 29 July 2020
- President: Emmerson Mnangagwa
- Deputy: Davis Marapira
- Succeeded by: Anxious Masuka

Commander of the Air Force of Zimbabwe
- In office 1992 – 7 December 2017
- President: Robert Mugabe
- Preceded by: Josiah Tungamirai
- Succeeded by: Shebba Shumbayaonda (Acting)

Personal details
- Born: Bigboy Samson Chikerema; 11 January 1955 Gweru, Southern Rhodesia
- Died: 29 July 2020 (aged 65) Harare, Zimbabwe
- Children: 1
- Education: Royal College of Defence Studies
- Awards: Grand Commander of the Zimbabwe Order of Merit
- Nickname: Perrance Shiri

Military service
- Allegiance: Zimbabwe
- Branch/service: Air Force of Zimbabwe
- Rank: Air Chief Marshal
- Commands: Fifth Brigade; Air Force of Zimbabwe

Perrance Shiri (born Bigboy Samson Chikerema; 11 January 1955 – 29 July 2020) was a Zimbabwean air officer and government official who served as Minister of Lands, Agriculture and Rural Resettlement in the Cabinet of Zimbabwe from 1 December 2017 until his death on 29 July 2020. He was the commander of the Air Force of Zimbabwe and member of the Joint Operations Command which exerts day-by-day control over Zimbabwe's government.

Perrance Shiri was a cousin of former President Robert Mugabe. He called himself "Black Jesus", because according to an anonymous claim on the BBC Panorama documentary "The Price of Silence", he "could determine your life like Jesus Christ. He could heal, raise the dead, whatever. So he claimed to be like that because he could say if you live or not."

On 30 November 2017, Shiri was appointed Minister of Agriculture by President Emmerson Mnangagwa. On 18 December he was promoted from Air Marshal to Air Chief Marshal upon retirement.

== Career ==
=== Military service ===
From 1983 to 1984, the Zimbabwean Fifth Brigade, under Shiri's command, was responsible for a reign of terror in Matabeleland. During the slaughter, thousands of civilians were killed and thousands more were tortured. Despite this, in 1986, Shiri was granted a place at the Royal College of Defence Studies in London.

In 1992, Shiri was appointed the commander of the Air Force of Zimbabwe, taking over from Air Chief Marshal Josiah Tungamirai.

Shiri was in command of the Zimbabwean troops at the start of the Second Congo War. It was Shiri who decided that the Zimbabwean contingent would defend N'Djili and its airport. This was in order to maintain an air route for resupply and reinforcements if needed.

In the late-1990s and early-2000s, Shiri was reported to have organised farm invasions by war veterans. In 2002, in response to the subsequent food shortage, Mugabe dispatched Shiri to South Africa to purchase maize. This undertaking was backed by a credit note for the equivalent of £17 million from the Libyan leader, Colonel Gaddafi.

With the Mugabe government facing increasing problems, the Zimbabwean press reported in February 2007 that Shiri was regularly attending General Solomon Mujuru’s unofficial meetings with other senior military commanders and some political leaders. These meetings had discussed forcing Mugabe to the polls in 2008 with a view to his replacement as president.

In 2008 some Zimbabwean lawyers and opposition politicians from Mutare claimed that Shiri managed military assaults on illegal diggers in the diamond mines in the east of Zimbabwe.

=== 2008 election ===
In the days before the 2008 Zimbabwean presidential election Shiri, along with other Zimbabwean Defence chiefs, held a press conference where they stated that defence and security forces had been deployed across the country to maintain order. In a remark aimed against the Movement for Democratic Change, the defence chiefs stated that it would be a criminal act for anyone to declare himself the winner of the election. They maintained that such a statement must only be made by the Zimbabwe Electoral Commission.

=== Sanctions against Shiri ===
In 2002 the European Union barred then Air Marshal Shiri from entering the EU and on 6 March 2003, George W. Bush ordered the blocking of any of Shiri's property in the United States.

=== Assassination attempt ===
Shiri was ambushed on 13 December 2008 while driving to his farm. According to police, he was accosted by unknown people who shot at his car. Thinking one of his tyres had burst, he got out and was shot in the arm. It has been speculated that the assassination attempt was a response to Shiri's attacks on illegal diamond miners in 2008 or because of his role in Matabeleland in the 1980s.

In October 2013, Shiri's son, Titus Takudzwa Chikerema, died at the age of 21.

== 2017 coup and ministerial appointment ==
Shiri was influential in orchestrating the 2017 Zimbabwean coup d'état which removed Mugabe from power. On 30 November 2017, Shiri was appointed Minister of Agriculture by President Emmerson Mnangagwa. On 18 December he was promoted from Air Marshal to Air Chief Marshal upon retirement.

== Death ==
Shiri died on 29 July 2020, after being hospitalized the day before. He was 65; local news sources say his death was due to complications from COVID-19 during the COVID-19 pandemic in Zimbabwe. Mnangagwa described Shiri as a “longtime friend and colleague” and “a true patriot.” Shiri was subsequently succeeded by Anxious Jongwe Masuka as the Minister of Lands, Agriculture, and Rural Resettlement.

Military offices
Preceded by Josiah Tungamirai	Commander of the Air Force of Zimbabwe; 1992–2017	Succeeded by Elson Moyo
Political offices
Preceded by Joseph Made; As Minister of Agriculture, Mechanisation, and Irrigation Development	Minister of Lands, Agriculture, and Rural Resettlement; 2017–2020	Succeeded by Anxious Jongwe Masuka
Preceded by Douglas Mombeshora; As Minister of Lands and Rural Resettlement	Minister of Lands, Agriculture, and Rural Resettlement; 2017–2020	Succeeded by Anxious Jongwe Masuka
