= Sydney Sekeramayi =

Zimbabwean politician

The Right Honourable Doctor Sydney Sekeramayi MP

Minister of Defence
- In office 11 September 2013 – 27 November 2017
- President: Robert Mugabe
- Preceded by: Emmerson Mnangagwa
- Succeeded by: Kembo Mohadi
- In office 2001 – 13 February 2009
- President: Robert Mugabe
- Preceded by: Moven Mahachi
- Succeeded by: Emmerson Mnangagwa

Minister of State for National Security in the President's Office
- In office 13 February 2009 – 11 September 2013
- President: Robert Mugabe
- Preceded by: Didymus Mutasa
- Succeeded by: Kembo Mohadi

Personal details
- Born: 30 March 1944 (age 82)
- Party: ZANU PF

Sydney Tigere Sekeramayi (born 30 March 1944) is a Zimbabwean politician who served in the government of Zimbabwe as Minister of Defence between 2013 and 2017. He has been a minister in the Cabinet since independence in 1980, serving as Minister of Defence from 2001 to 2009 and Minister of State Security from 2009 to 2013.

During the Rhodesian Bush War, Sekeramayi was the Zimbabwe African National Union's representative in Sweden. After the war he served as the Minister of National Security, Deputy Secretary of Health Minister for National Security, and Minister for Transport and Welfare.

It was announced on 27 November 2017 that the Zimbabwe cabinet had been dissolved by Mugabe's successor Emmerson Mnangagwa.

== Life and career ==
In Rhodesia his school expelled him. He moved to Czechoslovakia to study on an NDP scholarship with help from Rupiah Banda, the International Secretary of the Zambia Students Union. Banda established contact between Sekeramayi and the NIB. In June 1964 he moved from Czechoslovakia to Lund, Sweden, on an NIB scholarship. He studied genetics at the University of Lund, became ZANU's representative in Sweden, and then attended medical school. In Lund he studied with Alexander Chikwanda of the United National Independence Party of Zambia.

In 1969 Sekeramayi requested assistance from SIDA in his function as Secretary-General of the Zimbabwe Students' Union in Europe. He coordinated Herbert Chitepo and Richard Grove's visits to Sweden. In 1976 he moved to Mozambique.

In the 1980s he participated in the Gukurahundi massacres.

In 2001 Defense Minister Moven Mahachi died in a car crash and Sekeramayi became the new Defense Minister. In 2005 William Mervin Gumede mentioned Sekeramayi as one of several leading politicians who may succeed Mugabe as President of Zimbabwe because of their support among the military.

He is considered a close ally of Emmerson Mnangagwa, formerly the Speaker of Parliament, and Joyce Mujuru.

Sekeramayi won the House of Assembly seat from Marondera East constituency, in Mashonaland East Province, as the ZANU-PF candidate in the March 2005 parliamentary election. According to official results he defeated Movement for Democratic Change (MDC) candidate Iain Kay with 19,912 votes against Kay's 10,066 votes; this victory was questioned on the grounds that the total number of votes was said to exceed voter turnout.

In the ZANU-PF primaries for the March 2008 parliamentary election, Sekeramayi again sought the party's nomination as its candidate for the House of Assembly seat from Marondera East, but was defeated. He was instead nominated as ZANU-PF's candidate for the Senate from Marondera-Hwedza in Mashonaland East. Sekeramayi won this seat according to official results, receiving 24,571 votes against 17,370 for Jane Chifamba of the MDC-Tsvangirai faction and 6,994 for Molai Penelope of the MDC-Mutambara faction.

On 7 January 2009, The Herald reported that Sekeramayi had been appointed as Acting Minister of Mines and Mining Development following the dismissal of Amos Midzi, who failed to win a seat in the 2008 election. When the national unity government was sworn in on 13 February 2009, Sekeramayi became Minister of State Security. He was at this point in time seen as a likely Mugabe successor who is less controversial.

Following the dissolution of the Cabinet of Zimbabwe in 2017, it was announced that Mnangagwa allowed only Patrick Chinamasa and Simbarashe Mumbengegwi to remain as acting ministers of Finance and Foreign Affairs respectively until the appointment of a new cabinet.

He was placed on a European Union sanctions list in 2002 and on the United States sanctions list the following year.
