= Marondera East =

- Constituency for the National Assembly of Zimbabwe
- Province: Mashonaland East
- Region: Marondera District

Current constituency
- Number of members: 1
- Party: ZANU–PF
- Member(s): Vimbayi Mutokonyi

Marondera East is a constituency represented in the National Assembly of the Parliament of Zimbabwe, located in Marondera District in Mashonaland East Province. Its current MP since the 2023 general election is Vimbayi Mutokonyi of ZANU–PF.

== History ==
In the March 2005 parliamentary election, the candidate of ZANU–PF, Sydney Sekeramayi, was declared the winner. This outcome was disputed.

In the 2018 election, Patrick Chidakwa of ZANU–PF was elected to represent the constituency. Chidakwa died on 11 September 2020, and was replaced by Jeremiah Chiwetu, also of ZANU–PF, following a 26 March 2022 by-election. ZANU–PF candidate Vimbayi Mutokonyi was elected to the seat in the 2023 election with 15,221 votes.

== Members ==
Election	Name	Party
2000	Sydney Sekeramayi	ZANU–PF
2005	Sydney Sekeramayi	ZANU–PF
Constituency abolished 2008–2013
2013	Jeremiah Chiwetu	ZANU–PF
2018	Patrick Chidakwa	ZANU–PF
2022 by-election	Jeremiah Chiwetu	ZANU–PF
2023	Vimbayi Mutokonyi	ZANU–PF

== Election results ==
2022 by-election: Marondera East
Candidate	Party	Votes	%	+/–
Jeremiah Z Chiwetu	ZANU–PF	9,379	82.01	+2.70
Samuel Machekanyanga	CCC	1,874	16.39	New
Thomas Tasarirenhamo	MDC Alliance	104	0.91	-18.97
Moses Mandaza	Zimbabwe Labour Party	80	0.70	-0.11
Total		11,437	100.00	–
Majority		7,505	65.62	+6.19
ZANU–PF hold				

== See also ==
- List of Zimbabwean parliamentary constituencies
