= Bulawayo Central Hospital =

Geography
- Location: Bulawayo, Zimbabwe
- Coordinates: 20°10′12″S 28°34′48″E

Organisation
- Type: District General Hospital

Services
- Beds: 600

Links
- Other links: List of hospitals in Zimbabwe

Bulawayo Central Hospital is a 600-bed health care institution located in Bulawayo, Zimbabwe. The hospital is founded in 1930's and it covering Bulawayo Metropolitan. The hospital is operated under the ministry of health of Zimbabwe.

The Government of Zimbabwe funds the hospital, this is supplemented by fees from patients.

== Services ==
- Internal Medicine
- Orthopaedics Surgery
- Obstetrics & Gynaecology
- HIV & AIDS Management
- Urology
- Neurosurgery
- General Surgery

== CMD/Director ==
The director of the hospital is Dr.William Busumani.

== See also ==
- List of hospitals in Zimbabwe
