= Samuel Parirenyatwa =

First black physician in Zimbabwe

Dr Samuel Parirenyatwa

First Vice-President of ZAPU
- In office January 1962 – August 1962

Personal details
- Born: Tichafa Samuel Parirenyatwa; 17 July 1927 Rusape, Southern Rhodesia
- Died: 14 August 1962 (aged 35) Bulawayo, Southern Rhodesia
- Party: Zimbabwe African People's Union
- Spouse: Sibongile Yeni
- Children: David Parirenyatwa
- Education: Fort Hare University; University of Witwatersrand
- Occupation: Politician
- Profession: Physician

Tichafa Samuel Parirenyatwa (17 July 1927 – 14 August 1962) was Zimbabwe's first trained black physician, medical doctor and the first vice-president of the Zimbabwe African People's Union (ZAPU). He rose to prominence during ZAPU's political struggle against the colonial administration in Southern Rhodesia.

== Early life ==
Parirenyatwa was born at Rusape in Manicaland and grew up in Sakubva township, Mutare. Along with many future Zimbabwean nationalists, he matriculated at South Africa's University of Fort Hare in the Eastern Cape, subsequently obtaining his degree from the University of Witwatersrand. He later underwent further medical training in Durban.

Upon returning to Southern Rhodesia, Parirenyatwa was instrumental in forming the Mashonaland Herbalists' Association – the first organisation of n'angas in Sub-Saharan Africa at the time. This group recognised traditional healers as public servants and set a general code of conduct for dealings with the Rhodesian public.

== Political career ==
Parirenyatwa resigned from government service in 1961 to commit to politics full time, having joined the National Democratic Party upon the banning of the Southern Rhodesia African National Congress. It was around this time that he emerged as one of the leading nationalists in the territory, alongside Joshua Nkomo, Robert Mugabe, and Ndabaningi Sithole.

In January 1962, Parirenyatwa was appointed deputy president of the newly formed ZAPU by Nkomo for his work in organising the nationalist party network on executive lines. Well respected among Rhodesia's black upper class, ZAPU's new deputy also won favour with the rural poor via his respect for cultural traditions and continued work with the Mashonaland herbalists.

One of Parirenyatwa's most difficult roles in his new position was to broker negotiations between the radical nationalists and the Southern Rhodesia Trade Union Congress, represented by Reuben Jamela, who had previously experienced a falling out with ZAPU over his refusal to demonstrate his allegiance to Marxism-Leninism by joining the communist-led World Federation of Trade Unions. Despite this rift Parirenyatwa recognised that union support was necessary for the party to survive, and hoped to bring Jamela's supporters back into the nationalist fold without confrontation. In a six-hour meeting with the SRTUC, he proposed awarding the latter an executive position with ZAPU in exchange for disassociation from the International Confederation of Free Trade Unions. Jamela's floundering relationship with the nationalists was finally severed by Nkomo and Mugabe upon Parirenyatwa's death in August 1962; he went on to form his own Pan-African Socialist Party (PASU) later that year.

== Death ==
On 14 August 1962, information reached ZAPU from contacts in the British South Africa Police that Southern Rhodesia Prime Minister Edgar Whitehead was planning security crackdowns on known party affiliates. Nkomo subsequently phoned Parirenyatwa at his Salisbury home that evening, ordering an immediate conference in Bulawayo to plan contingencies for those spared the police net. A car was dispatched to take the vice president four hundred kilometres to Matabeleland. Initially, there were four occupants, of whom two reportedly left the car in Gwelo (or Gweru) when it was clear they were being trailed by police cars. Parirenyatwa and the driver, Sibanda, stopped for petrol in Shangani. According to Sibanda at the inquest, they were stopped a mile beyond Shangani and accosted by some unidentified Europeans. As it approached Bulawayo, the vehicle suffered a collision with a speeding train, which dragged it for several metres. Parirenyatwa was killed outright. This account was confirmed by the driver, although Nkomo's lawyer later claimed that the deceased's hands bore marks suggesting he had been bound with rope. (According to Shamuyarira, Sibanda reported having no memory of the event after the alleged beating.)

Parirenyatwa's funeral, held on his father's farm, drew thousands of visitors, including Nkomo, Ndabaningi Sithole, Robert Mugabe, Leopold Takawira, and Josiah Mushore Chinamano. Even Reuben Jamela, with whom Parirenyatwa had enjoyed a cordial working relationship, chose to attend – despite the hostility incurred from radicals present. During the funeral Jamela was assaulted and left for dead; ZAPU youth also burned his car despite an attempt to impose order by Mugabe.

=== Legacy ===
After Mugabe's ascension to power in 1980, Salisbury's Andrew Fleming Medical Centre was renamed Parirenyatwa Hospital by the Zimbabwean government and opened to all races.

The legacy of Parirenyatwa's work continues since his son, David Parirenyatwa—also a medical doctor—served as Zimbabwe's Minister of Health from 2002 to 2009 and again since 2013.
