= Sylvester Nguni =

Zimbabwean politician

Sylvester Robert Nguni (born 4 May 1955) was the Zimbabwean Minister of State in the office of Vice-President Joyce Mujuru. A member of ZANU–PF, he was the Member of House of Assembly for Mhondoro–Mubaira. He was placed on the United States sanctions list from 2005 until 2016.
