= Parirenyatwa General Hospital =

Coordinates: 17.8115°S 31.0426°E

Geography
- Location: Harare, Zimbabwe

Organisation
- Type: Teaching, general
- Affiliated university: College of Health Sciences, University of Zimbabwe

Services
- Beds: 5,000

Links
- Lists: Hospitals in Zimbabwe
- Other links: List of hospitals in Zimbabwe

Parirenyatwa General Hospital is a government founded district general hospital in Harare and is the largest public hospital in Zimbabwe. The hospital was formerly known as the Andrew Fleming Hospital and was named after the principal medical officer to the British South Africa Company.

== History ==
Following Zimbabwean independence in 1980, the hospital was renamed in honour of Tichafa Samuel Parirenyatwa (1927–1962), a close associate of Joshua Nkomo and the first black person from the country to qualify as a doctor of medicine.

As well as its general medical and surgical sections, the hospital includes Mbuya Nehanda, a maternity section; Sekuru Kaguvi, which specialises in eye treatment; and an annex for psychiatric patients and several specialist paediatric wards. It has in excess of 5000 beds and 12 theatres in the main hospital complex.

== Nursing school ==
The College of Health Sciences of the University of Zimbabwe is based at Parirenyatwa. This is where the university's medical students train from third year onwards.

The hospital has a school of nursing within the complex, which has three intakes of general nurses per year for a three-year diploma in nursing and some post-basic courses in intensive/theatre nursing, community and primary care nursing, and ophthalmic nursing.

The hospital introduced a quality management program in hospitals in 2005, led by Thomas Zigora, Sydney Makarawo, Max Hove, and Kennedy Gombe, which proved a difference in the way of thinking in delivering health care services. The program is currently coordinated by Godwin Mseka.
