= Ministry of Health and Child Care (Zimbabwe) =

Government ministry of Zimbabwe

Ministry overview
- Formed: 1980
- Preceding Ministry: Ministry of Health of Rhodesia
- Jurisdiction: Government of Zimbabwe
- Headquarters: 4th Floor Kaguvi Building, Central Avenue, Harare; 17.823693197622006°S 31.05407749017939°E
- Minister responsible: Douglas Mombeshora, Minister of Health and Child Care
- Deputy Minister responsible: Sleiman Timios Kwidini, Deputy Minister of Health and Child Care
- Website: mohcc.gov.zw

The Ministry of Health and Child Care (MoHCC) is the government ministry responsible for health in Zimbabwe. The current minister is Douglas Mombeshora. Retired General Constantino Dominic Chiwenga was appointed to head the Ministry in September 2018. On 7 July 2020, the President of Zimbabwe, Emmerson Mnangagwa dismissed Moyo from the office of Cabinet Minister, removing him for "conduct inappropriate for a Government Minister". This was after Moyo had been arrested and charged with three counts of criminal abuse of duty as a public officer, for his alleged participation in a scam that involves tens of millions of dollars. The Permanent Secretary was Dr. Agnes Mahomva, who in 2018 took over from Major General Dr Gerald Gwinji. Dr. Mahomva is now the Chief Coordinator for the national COVID-19 response in the Office of the President and Cabinet.

The Ministry oversees:

- Hospitals

== List of ministers ==
No.	Name	Term start	Term end	Party
1	Herbert Ushewokunze	1980	1982	ZANU–PF
2	Sydney Sekeramayi	1982	1986	ZANU–PF
3	Timothy Stamps	1986	August 2002	ZANU–PF
4	David Parirenyatwa	August 2002	13 February 2009	ZANU–PF
5	Henry Madzorera	13 February 2009	10 September 2013	MDC–T
6	David Parirenyatwa	10 September 2013	10 September 2018	ZANU–PF
7	Obadiah Moyo	10 September 2018	7 July 2020	ZANU–PF
8	Constantino Chiwenga	4 August 2020	11 September 2023	ZANU–PF
9	Douglas Mombeshora	11 September 2023	present	ZANU–PF
