= 8th Parliament of Zimbabwe =

←	7th Parliament	9th Parliament	→
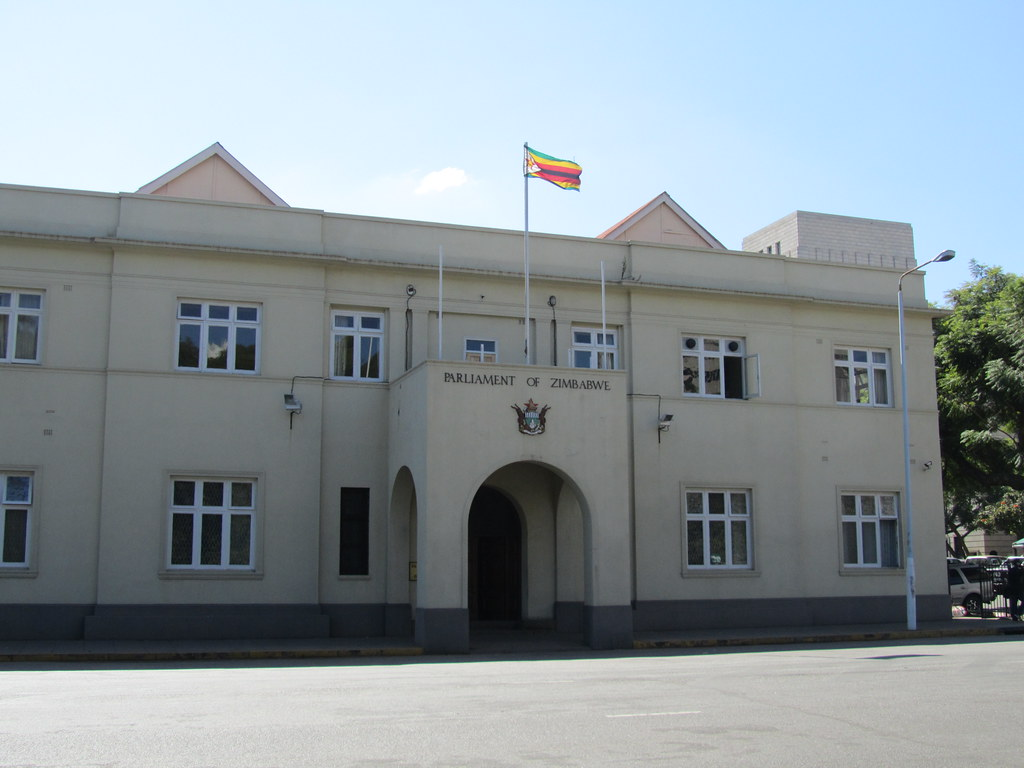
- Parliament House, Harare

Overview
- Legislative body: Parliament of Zimbabwe
- Jurisdiction: Zimbabwe
- Meeting place: Parliament House, Harare
- Term: 22 August 2013 (Note: Under the Constitution of Zimbabwe, a new term of Parliament begins on the day that the President-Elect is sworn in following a general election. Members themselves were sworn in on 3 September 2013.) – 29 July 2018
- Election: 2013 Zimbabwean general election
- Government: Eighth Mugabe Cabinet; First Mnangagwa Cabinet
- Website: parlzim.gov.zw

National Assembly
- Members: 270
- Speaker: Jacob Mudenda
- Deputy Speaker: Mabel Chinomona
- Clerk: Austin Zvoma; Kennedy Mugove Chokuda
- Party control: ZANU-PF

Senate
- Members: 80
- President: Edna Madzongwe
- Deputy President: Chen Chimutengwende
- Clerk: Austin Zvoma; Kennedy Mugove Chokuda
- Party control: None (de jure); ZANU-PF (de facto) (Note: The Chiefs typically vote in line with ZANU-PF Senators.)

Sessions
- 1st: 17 September 2013 – 30 September 2014
- 2nd: 28 October 2014 – 25 August 2015
- 3rd: 15 September 2015 – 4 October 2016
- 4th: 6 October 2016 – 3 August 2017
- 5th: 12 September 2017 – 29 July 2018

In Zimbabwe's 2013 general election, 210 members of the National Assembly were elected to the National Assembly – one for each parliamentary constituency. The Constitution of Zimbabwe provided for a further 60 female members, representing a women's quota, chosen by proportional representation based on the constituency votes. This was the first Parliament to be elected and sit under the new Constitution of Zimbabwe.

As part of the election, a new Senate was also elected. 60 members - six for each of Zimbabwe's 10 provinces - were elected by proportional representation, 16 traditional Chiefs were elected by the Council of Chiefs, while the President and Deputy President of the Council of Chiefs are automatically Senators. The final two seats in the Senate are made up of representatives of persons with disabilities, chosen by the National Disability Board.

The Zimbabwean Parliament comprises the elected National Assembly, the Senate and the President of Zimbabwe. The list of new parliamentarians was published in an Extraordinary edition of the Zimbabwe Government Gazette on 9 August 2013.

== Overview ==
The 8th Parliament of Zimbabwe's membership was set by the 31 July 2013 election, which gave the incumbent ruling party, ZANU–PF, a parliamentary majority, with control of both the Senate and the National Assembly. One Independent candidate was elected, and the MDC-T won the remaining constituency seats in the National Assembly. The breakaway MDC party, led by Welshman Ncube, won 2 seats each in the Senate and Proportional Representation Women's Quota.

Per Section 143 (1) of the Constitution of Zimbabwe, the 8th Parliament officially began the day the president-elect is sworn in. Per Section 145 (1) of the Constitution, the president advises as to the date of the official opening of Parliament, and Section 145 (2) stipulates that the date will be officially set by the Clerk of Parliament. The official opening of Parliament must not be held more than 30 days after the presidential inauguration.

The 8th Parliament was rocked by political in-fighting between the various factions of the MDC. Members were recalled at various points and replaced by rival MDC candidates (see below for more detail). There was also in-fighting within ZANU-PF, with members allied to Vice-President Joice Mujuru being recalled.

== Alignment of electoral laws with the 2013 Constitution ==
The 2013 Constitution required comprehensive amendment of the Electoral Act to accommodate the new PR systems for women's seats in the Assembly and elected senators. The existing Act lacked mechanisms for filling vacancies in party-list positions. The Electoral Amendment Act (No. 6 of 2014) was only gazetted in late 2014, creating a legal lacuna that prevented replacement of deceased or resigned party-list senators for over a year. Vacancies arising shortly after the 2013 elections thus remained unfilled until August 2014, when ZANU–PF submitted names to the Zimbabwe Electoral Commission under the new procedures.

== MDC–T split and mass recalls (2014–2015) ==
The Movement for Democratic Change – Tsvangirai suffered a debilitating schism in 2014 when senior members, including secretary-general Tendai Biti and deputy treasurer-general Elton Mangoma, challenged Morgan Tsvangirai's leadership after the 2013 electoral defeat. Suspensions and counter-suspensions followed, culminating in the formation of the MDC Renewal Team (later United Movement for Democratic Change under Biti and Welshman Ncube).

In early 2015, Tsvangirai's faction invoked section 129(1)(k) of the Constitution – which terminates a seat if a member ceases to belong to the sponsoring party – to recall 21 MPs perceived as aligned with the breakaway group. Speaker Jacob Mudenda declared the seats vacant in March 2015. By-elections held in June 2015 were boycotted by MDC–T, resulting in ZANU–PF sweeping 16 seats uncontested or with minimal opposition, further entrenching its two-thirds majority.

== ZANU–PF factionalism and the Mujuru purges (2014–2015) ==
Intense succession battles within ZANU–PF erupted after the 2013 victory. Former Vice-President Joice Mujuru and allies were accused of plotting to assassinate or overthrow Mugabe, charges rooted in the rivalry between the "Gamatox" faction (associated with Mujuru) and the emerging "Lacoste" group backing Emmerson Mnangagwa. Mujuru was expelled from the party in December 2014 and dismissed as vice-president.

Several Mujuru-aligned MPs and ministers faced expulsion threats, but ZANU–PF largely avoided mass recalls to prevent costly by-elections in potentially vulnerable rural seats and to conserve finances. Instead, suspensions of varying lengths were imposed on many, while outright expulsions were limited. Three MPs – Kudakwashe Bhasikiti (Mwenezi East), Ray Kaukonde (Marondera Central), and David Butau (Mbire) – were expelled and their seats declared vacant in 2015.

== Constitution of Zimbabwe Amendment (No. 1) Act, 2017 ==
In 2017, Parliament passed the Constitution of Zimbabwe Amendment (No. 1) Bill, removing public interviews for the Chief Justice, Deputy Chief Justice, and Judge President of the High Court, allowing presidential appointment after mere consultation with the Judicial Service Commission. The bill sparked controversy over judicial independence. Debate in the Senate centred on whether a two-thirds majority had been achieved amid vacant seats; opponents argued the threshold should be calculated on total membership (80), not present members. The government insisted on voting members. The bill passed and was assented to by Mugabe on 7 September 2017, though later challenged (the Constitutional Court in 2020 declared the original Senate passage invalid but suspended invalidity to allow re-passage).

== November 2017 political crisis and Mugabe's removal ==
The dismissal of Vice-President Emmerson Mnangagwa on 6 November 2017 – seen as clearing the path for First Lady Grace Mugabe – triggered the military intervention of 14–21 November 2017. Described by the Zimbabwe Defence Forces as an operation to target "criminals" around Mugabe rather than a coup, armoured vehicles entered Harare, state media was seized, and Mugabe was confined to house arrest.

On 19 November, ZANU–PF's Central Committee removed Mugabe as party leader, replacing him with Mnangagwa, and set a resignation ultimatum. When Mugabe defied it in a televised address, Parliament convened a rare joint sitting on 21 November at the Harare International Conference Centre (the Parliament chamber being too small). The motion for impeachment under section 97 of the Constitution – charging Mugabe with serious misconduct, failure to uphold the Constitution, and loss of public confidence – was moved by ZANU–PF Senator Monica Mutsvangwa and seconded by MDC–T MP James Maridadi, symbolising cross-party unity.

As the impeachment committee began work, Speaker Mudenda announced Mugabe's resignation letter, effective immediately. Jubilant scenes erupted in the chamber and streets. Mnangagwa was sworn in as president on 24 November 2017, pledging a "new unfolding democracy".

== National Assembly ==
=== Composition of the National Assembly ===
The National Assembly was made up of 270 members, as well as the presiding officer, known as the Speaker, who is elected at the Assembly's first sitting. A Member of the National Assembly who is elected as Speaker ceases to be a Member of the National Assembly, and the vacant seat must be filled in accordance with the Electoral Law.

Members
	Elected in July 2013			At dissolution in July 2018			
Constituency Maps							
Assembly composition							
Party	Common	Women	Total	Common	Women	Total	Change
ZANU–PF	160	37	197	159	35	194	▼3
MDC–T	49	21	70	34	21	55	▼15
MDC–N	0	2	2	0	2	2	Steady
Independent	1	0	1	1	0	1	Steady
Total	210	60	270	194	58	252	▼18
Vacant	0	0	0	16	2	18	▲18
Speaker	1			1			Steady
Government majority	124			136			▲12

=== Elected Constituency Members ===
210 members of the National Assembly were elected by secret ballot from the 210 constituencies into which Zimbabwe is divided. The following members were gazetted as having won seats during the general election in July 2013.

Constituency	Party of incumbent at previous election	Member returned	Party of incumbent after election	Notes
Bulawayo Province
Bulawayo Central	MDC-T	Dorcas Staff Sibanda	MDC-T	Reelected
Bulawayo East	MDC-T	Thabitha Khumalo	MDC-T	Reelected
Bulawayo South	MDC-T	Edward Graham Cross	MDC-T	Reelected
Emakhandeni–Entumbane	MDC-T	Dingilizwe Tshuma	MDC-T	
Lobengula	MDC-T	Samuel Sipepa Nkomo	MDC-T	Reelected. Expelled from party on 17 March 2015.
Luveve	MDC-T	Reggie Moyo	MDC-T	Reelected. Expelled from party on 17 March 2015.
Magwegwe	MDC-T	Anele Ndebele	MDC-T	
Makokoba	MDC-T	Gorden Moyo	MDC-T	Expelled from party on 17 March 2015.
Nketa	MDC-T	Phelela Masuku	MDC-T	
Nkulumane	MDC-T	Tamsanqa Mahlangu	MDC-T	Reelected. Died 5 October 2015.
Pelandaba–Mpopoma	MDC-T	Bekithemba Nyathi	MDC-T	Expelled from party on 17 March 2015.
Pumula	MDC-T	Albert Mhlanga	MDC-T	Reelected. Expelled from party on 17 March 2015.
Harare Province
Budiriro	MDC-T	Costa Machingauta	MDC-T	
Chitungwiza North	MDC-T	Godfrey Karakadzayi Sithole	MDC-T	
Chitungwiza South	MDC-T	Christopher M Chikavanga Chigumba	ZANU-PF	
Dzivarasekwa	MDC-T	Solomon Madzore	MDC-T	Expelled from party on 17 March 2015.
Epworth	MDC-T	Amos Bernard Muvengwa Midzi	ZANU-PF	Died on 9 June 2015
Glen Norah	MDC-T	Webster Maondera	MDC-T	
Glen View North	MDC-T	Fani Munengami	MDC-T	Reelected
Glen View South	MDC-T	Paul Madzore	MDC-T	Reelected. Expelled from party on 17 March 2015.
Harare Central	MDC-T	Murisi Zwizwai	MDC-T	Reelected
Harare East	MDC-T	Tendai Laxton Biti	MDC-T	Reelected. Expelled from party on 17 March 2015.
Harare North	MDC-T	Tongesayi Mudambo	ZANU-PF	
Harare South	ZANU-PF	Shadreck Mashayamombe	ZANU-PF	Expelled from Party on 10 January 2018.
Harare West	MDC-T	Fungayi Jessie Majome	MDC-T	Reelected
Hatfield	MDC-T	Tapiwa Mashakada	MDC-T	Reelected
Highfield East	MDC-T	Erick Murai	MDC-T	
Highfield West	MDC-T	Moses Manyengavana	MDC-T	Expelled from party on 17 March 2015.
Kambuzuma	MDC-T	Willias Madzimure	MDC-T	Reelected. Expelled from party on 17 March 2015.
Kuwadzana	MDC-T	Lucia Gladys Matibenga	MDC-T	Reelected. Expelled from party on 17 March 2015.
Kuwadzana East	MDC-T	Nelson Chamisa	MDC-T	Reelected
Mabvuku-Tafara	MDC-T	James Maridadi	MDC-T	
Mbare	MDC-T	Tendai Savanhu	ZANU-PF	
Mount Pleasant	MDC-T	Jaison Passade	ZANU-PF	
Mufakose	MDC-T	Paurina Mpariwa	MDC-T	Reelected
Southerton	MDC-T	Gift Chimanikire	MDC-T	Reelected
St Mary's	MDC-T	Unganai Dickson Tarusenga	MDC-T	
Sunningdale	MDC-T	Margaret Matienga	MDC-T	Reelected
Warren Park	MDC-T	Elias Mudzuri	MDC-T	Reelected
Zengeza East	MDC-T	Alexio Leon Musundire	MDC-T	Reelected
Zengeza West	MDC-T	Simon Chidhakwa	MDC-T	
Manicaland Province
Buhera Central	MDC-T	Johanne Ronald Muderedzwa	ZANU-PF	
Buhera North	ZANU-PF	William Mutomba	ZANU-PF	Reelected
Buhera South	MDC-T	Joseph Chinotimba	ZANU-PF	
Buhera West	MDC-T	Oliver Mandipaka	ZANU-PF	
Chimanimani East	ZANU-PF	Samuel Undenge	ZANU-PF	Reelected. Expelled from Party on 10 January 2018.
Chimanimani West	MDC-T	Munacho Thomas Alvar Mutezo	ZANU-PF	Expelled from party on 2 August 2016
Chipinge Central	ZANU-PF	Raymore Machingura	ZANU-PF	
Chipinge East	MDC-T	Win Busayi Juyana Mlambo	ZANU-PF	
Chipinge South	MDC-T	Enock Porusingazi	ZANU-PF	
Chipinge West	MDC-T	Adam Chimwamurombe	ZANU-PF	
Dangamvura–Chikanga	MDC-T	Arnold Tsunga	MDC-T	Expelled from party on 17 March 2015.
Headlands	ZANU-PF	Didymus Noel Mutasa	ZANU-PF	Reelected. Expelled on 18 February 2015.
Makoni Central	MDC-T	Patrick Anthony Chinamasa	ZANU-PF	
Makoni North	MDC-T	Francis Muchenje	ZANU-PF	
Makoni South	MDC-T	Mandi Manditawepi Chimene	ZANU-PF	Expelled from Party on 27 November 2017.
Makoni West	MDC-T	Kudzanai Chipanga	ZANU-PF	Expelled from Party on 27 November 2017.
Musikavanhu	MDC-T	Chipfiwa Prosper Mutseyami	MDC-T	Reelected
Mutare Central	MDC-T	Innocent Tinashe Gonese	MDC-T	Reelected
Mutare North	ZANU-PF	Batsirayi John Pemhenayi	ZANU-PF	
Mutare South	ZANU-PF	Nyasha Chikwinya	ZANU-PF	
Mutare West	MDC-T	Christopher Chindoti Mushohwe	ZANU-PF	
Mutasa Central	MDC-T	Trevor Jones Lovelace Saruwaka	MDC-T	Reelected
Mutasa North	MDC-T	Luke Masamvu	ZANU-PF	
Mutasa South	MDC-T	Irene Zindi	ZANU-PF	
Nyanga North	MDC-T	Magadzire Hubert Nyanhongo	ZANU-PF	
Nyanga South	MDC-T	Supa Collins Mandiwanzira	ZANU-PF	
Mashonaland Central Province
Bindura North	ZANU-PF	Kenneth Shupikai Musanhi	ZANU-PF	
Bindura South	MDC-T	Toendepi Remigious Matangira	ZANU-PF	
Guruve North	ZANU-PF	Epmarcus Walter Kanhanga	ZANU-PF	
Guruve South	ZANU-PF	Chriswell Mutematsaka	ZANU-PF	Expelled from party on 20 January 2015
Mazowe Central	MDC-T	Tabitha Kanengoni	ZANU-PF	
Mazowe North	ZANU-PF	Edgar Chidavaenzi	ZANU-PF	Died on 17 March 2016
Mazowe South	ZANU-PF	Fortune Chasi	ZANU-PF	
Mazowe West	ZANU-PF	Kazembe Kazembe	ZANU-PF	
Mbire	ZANU-PF	David Butau	ZANU-PF	Expelled from party on 21 May 2015
Mount Darwin East	ZANU-PF	Christopher Kuruneri	ZANU-PF	
Mount Darwin North	ZANU-PF	Noveti Muponora	ZANU-PF	
Mount Darwin South	ZANU-PF	Saviour Kasukuwere	ZANU-PF	Reelected. Expelled from Party on 27 November 2017.
Mount Darwin West	ZANU-PF	Joice Mujuru	ZANU-PF	Reelected. Appointed Vice-President. Seat vacant from 11 September 2013.
Muzarabani North	ZANU-PF	Alfred Mufunga	ZANU-PF	
Muzarabani South	ZANU-PF	Christopher Chitindi	ZANU-PF	
Rushinga	ZANU-PF	Wonder Mashange	ZANU-PF	Expelled from Party on 10 January 2018.
Shamva North	ZANU-PF	Nicholas Tasunungurwa Goche	ZANU-PF	Reelected
Shamva South	ZANU-PF	Joseph Mapiki	ZANU-PF	
Mashonaland East Province
Chikomba Central	MDC-T	Felix Tapiwa Mhona	ZANU-PF	
Chikomba East	ZANU-PF	Edgar Mbwembwe	ZANU-PF	Reelected
Chikomba West	ZANU-PF	Michael Chakanaka Bimha	ZANU-PF	Reelected
Goromonzi North	ZANU-PF	Paddy Tendai Zhanda	ZANU-PF	Reelected
Goromonzi South	MDC-T	Petronella Kagonye	ZANU-PF	
Goromonzi West	ZANU-PF	Biata Beatrice Nyamupinga	ZANU-PF	Reelected
Maramba Pfungwe	ZANU-PF	Washington Musvaire	ZANU-PF	Reelected
Marondera Central	MDC-T	Ray Joseph Kaukonde	ZANU-PF	Expelled from party on 21 May 2015
Marondera East	ZANU-PF	Jeremiah Zvenyika Chiwetu	ZANU-PF	
Marondera West	ZANU-PF	Ambrose Mutinhiri	ZANU-PF	Reelected
Mudzi North	ZANU-PF	Newton Kachepa	ZANU-PF	Reelected
Mudzi South	ZANU-PF	Jonathan Tawonana Samukange	Independent	Member readmitted to ZANU-PF in February 2015.
Mudzi West	ZANU-PF	Aqualinah Katsande	ZANU-PF	Reelected. Died on 28 March 2015
Murewa North	ZANU-PF	Tendayi Makunde	ZANU-PF	
Murewa South	ZANU-PF	Joel Biggie Matiza	ZANU-PF	Reelected
Murewa West	MDC-T	Ladislus Fungayi Ndoro	ZANU-PF	
Mutoko East	ZANU-PF	Mubvumbi Ricky Nelson Sylvern Mawere	ZANU-PF	
Mutoko North	ZANU-PF	Mabel Memory Chinomona	ZANU-PF	Reelected
Mutoko South	ZANU-PF	David Chapfika	ZANU-PF	
Seke	ZANU-PF	Phineas Chivanze Chiota	ZANU-PF	Reelected
Uzumba	ZANU-PF	Simbaneuta Mudarikwa	ZANU-PF	Reelected
Wedza North	ZANU-PF	Simon Kundai Musanhu	ZANU-PF	Died on 15 January 2015
Wedza South	ZANU-PF	Michael Madanha	ZANU-PF	
Mashonaland West Province
Chakari	ZANU-PF	Aldrin Musiiwa	ZANU-PF	
Chegutu East	ZANU-PF	Webster Kotiwani Shamu	ZANU-PF	Reelected
Chegutu West	MDC-T	Dexter Nduna	ZANU-PF	
Chinhoyi	MDC-T	Peter Mataruse	MDC-T	
Hurungwe Central	ZANU-PF	Godfrey Beremauro	ZANU-PF	Reelected
Hurungwe East	ZANU-PF	Sarah Mahoka	ZANU-PF	Reelected. Expelled from Party on 10 January 2018.
Hurungwe North	ZANU-PF	Rueben Marumahoko	ZANU-PF	
Hurungwe West	MDC-T	Temba Peter Mliswa	ZANU-PF	Expelled on 18 February 2015.
Kadoma Central	MDC-T	Fani Phanuel Phiri	ZANU-PF	
Kariba	MDC-T	Isaac Mackenzie	ZANU-PF	
Magunje	ZANU-PF	Godfrey Gandawa	ZANU-PF	
Makonde	ZANU-PF	Kindness Paradza	ZANU-PF	
Mhangura	ZANU-PF	Douglas Mombeshora	ZANU-PF	Reelected
Mhondoro-Mubaira	ZANU-PF	Sylvester Robert Nguni	ZANU-PF	Reelected. Member expelled from party on 1 December 2015
Mhondoro-Ngezi	ZANU-PF	Mike Gava	ZANU-PF	
Muzvezve	ZANU-PF	Peter Haritatos	ZANU-PF	Reelected
Norton	MDC-T	Christopher Mutsvangwa	ZANU-PF	Expelled from party on 6 July 2016.
Sanyati	ZANU-PF	Blessed Runesu	ZANU-PF	
Zvimba East	ZANU-PF	Francis Mukwangwariwa	ZANU-PF	
Zvimba North	ZANU-PF	Ignatius Chombo	ZANU-PF	Reelected. Expelled from Party on 27 November 2017.
Zvimba South	ZANU-PF	Walter Chidhakwa	ZANU-PF	Reelected
Zvimba West	ZANU-PF	Ziyambi Ziyambi	ZANU-PF	
Masvingo Province
Bikita East	MDC-T	Kennedy Matimba	ZANU-PF	
Bikita South	MDC-T	Jeppy Jaboon	ZANU-PF	Expelled from Party on 10 January 2018.
Bikita West	MDC-T	Munyaradzi Kereke	ZANU-PF	Convicted and sentenced to 10 years’ imprisonment on 11 July 2016.
Chiredzi East	ZANU-PF	Denford Masiya	ZANU-PF	
Chiredzi North	ZANU-PF	Robert Mukwena	ZANU-PF	
Chiredzi South	ZANU-PF	Kalisto Killion Gwanetsa	ZANU-PF	
Chiredzi West	MDC-T	Darlington Chiwa	ZANU-PF	
Chivi Central	ZANU-PF	Ephraim Gwanongodza	ZANU-PF	
Chivi North	ZANU-PF	Mathias Tongofa	ZANU-PF	
Chivi South	ZANU-PF	Mafios Vutete	ZANU-PF	
Gutu Central	MDC-T	Lovemore Matuke	ZANU-PF	
Gutu East	MDC-T	Berta Chikwama	ZANU-PF	
Gutu North	MDC-T	Ticharwa Madondo	ZANU-PF	
Gutu South	MDC-T	Paul Chimedza	ZANU-PF	Expelled from Party on 10 January 2018.
Gutu West	ZANU-PF	Tongai Mathew Muzenda	ZANU-PF	
Masvingo Central	MDC-T	Mhere Edmond	ZANU-PF	
Masvingo North	ZANU-PF	Davis Marapira	ZANU-PF	
Masvingo South	ZANU-PF	Walter Mzembi	ZANU-PF	Reelected. Expelled from Party on 10 January 2018.
Masvingo Urban	MDC-T	Daniel Kuzozvireva Shumba	ZANU-PF	Expelled from Party on 10 January 2018.
Masvingo West	MDC-T	Ezra Ruvai Chadzamira	ZANU-PF	
Mwenezi East	ZANU-PF	Kudakwashe Tshuma Bhasikiti	ZANU-PF	Reelected. Expelled from party on 21 May 2015
Mwenezi West	ZANU-PF	Lamson Moyo	ZANU-PF	
Zaka Central	MDC-T	Paradzai Chakona	ZANU-PF	
Zaka East	ZANU-PF	Samson Mukanduri	ZANU-PF	Reelected. Died on 22 January 2018.
Zaka North	MDC-T	Robson Mavenyengwa	ZANU-PF	
Zaka West	MDC-T	Mapetere Mawere	ZANU-PF	
Matabeleland North Province
Binga North	MDC-T	Prince Dubeko Sibanda	MDC-T	
Binga South	MDC-T	Joel Gabuza Gabbuza	MDC-T	Reelected
Bubi	ZANU-PF	Clifford Cameroon Sibanda	ZANU-PF	Reelected
Hwange Central	MDC-T	Brian Tshuma	MDC-T	Reelected
Hwange East	MDC-T	Tose Wesley Sansole	MDC-T	Reelected
Hwange West	MDC-T	Bekithemba Mpofu	ZANU-PF	
Lupane East	MDC	Sithembile Gumbo	ZANU-PF	
Lupane West	ZANU-PF	Martin Khumalo	ZANU-PF	Reelected
Nkayi North	ZANU-PF	Sithembiso G Nyoni	ZANU-PF	Reelected
Nkayi South	MDC	Abedinico Bhebhe	MDC-T	Reelected
Tsholotsho North	Independent	Roseline Nkomo	MDC-T	Expelled from party on 17 March 2015.
Tsholotsho South	MDC	Zenzo Sibanda	ZANU-PF	
Umguza	ZANU-PF	Obert Moses Mpofu	ZANU-PF	Reelected
Matabeleland South Province
Beitbridge East	ZANU-PF	Kembo Campbell Mohadi	ZANU-PF	Reelected
Beitbridge West	ZANU-PF	Metrine Mudau	ZANU-PF	Reelected
Bulilima East	MDC	Mathias Ndlovu	ZANU-PF	
Bulilima West	MDC	Lungisani Nleya	ZANU-PF	
Gwanda Central	MDC	Edson Gumbo	ZANU-PF	
Gwanda North	MDC	Madodana Sibanda	ZANU-PF	
Gwanda South	ZANU-PF	Abedinico Ncube	ZANU-PF	
Insiza North	ZANU-PF	Andrew Langa	ZANU-PF	Reelected
Insiza South	MDC	Malach Nkomo	ZANU-PF	
Mangwe	MDC	Obendingwa Mguni	ZANU-PF	
Matobo North	MDC-T	Never Khanye	ZANU-PF	
Matobo South	MDC-T	Saul Ncube	ZANU-PF	
Umzingwane	MDC	William Makambaya Dewa	ZANU-PF	
Midlands Province
Chirumanzu	ZANU-PF	Innocent Pedzisai	ZANU-PF	
Chirumanzu Zibagwe	ZANU-PF	Emmerson Mnangagwa	ZANU-PF	Reelected. Appointed Vice-President. Seat vacant from 9 December 2014.
Chiwundura	ZANU-PF	Kizito Chivamba	ZANU-PF	Reelected. Died on 19 April 2017
Gokwe Central	ZANU-PF	Dorothy Mhangami	ZANU-PF	Reelected
Gokwe Chireya	ZANU-PF	Cephas Sindi	ZANU-PF	Reelected
Gokwe Gumunyu	ZANU-PF	Melania Mahiya	ZANU-PF	
Gokwe Kabuyuni	MDC-T	Leonard Chikomba	ZANU-PF	
Gokwe Kana	ZANU-PF	Owen Ncube	ZANU-PF	
Gokwe Mapfungautsi	ZANU-PF	Miriam Makweya	ZANU-PF	
Gokwe Nembudziya	ZANU-PF	Justice Mayor Wadyajena	ZANU-PF	
Gokwe Sengwa	ZANU-PF	Paul Mavima	ZANU-PF	
Gokwe Sasame	ZANU-PF	Jefrey Moses Runzitwayi	ZANU-PF	
Gweru Urban	MDC-T	Sesel Zvidzai	MDC-T	
Kwekwe Central	MDC-T	Masango Matambanadzo	ZANU-PF	
Mberengwa East	ZANU-PF	Makhosini Hlongwane	ZANU-PF	Reelected. Expelled from Party on 10 January 2018.
Mberengwa North	ZANU-PF	Tafanana Zhou	ZANU-PF	
Mberengwa South	ZANU-PF	Chiratidzo Mabuwa	ZANU-PF	
Mberengwa West	ZANU-PF	Joram Macdonald Gumbo	ZANU-PF	Reelected
Mbizo	MDC-T	Settlement Chikwinya	MDC-T	Reelected. Expelled from party on 17 March 2015.
Mkoba	MDC-T	Amos Chibaya	MDC-T	Reelected
Redcliff	ZANU-PF	Harris Ncube	ZANU-PF	
Shurugwi North	ZANU-PF	Chenaimoyo Nhema	ZANU-PF	Reelected
Shurugwi South	ZANU-PF	Tapiwanashe Matangaidze	ZANU-PF	Expelled from Party on 10 January 2018.
Silobela	MDC-T	Mtokozisi Manoki Mpofu	ZANU-PF	
Vungu	ZANU-PF	Josephat Madubeko	ZANU-PF	Reelected
Zhombe	MDC-T	Daniel Mackenzie Ncube	ZANU-PF	
Zvishavane Ngezi	ZANU-PF	John Holder	ZANU-PF	
Zvishavane Runde	ZANU-PF	Fred Moyo	ZANU-PF	

=== Women's Quota ===
An additional 60 women members, six from each of the provinces into which Zimbabwe is divided, were elected under a party-list system of proportional representation which is based on the votes cast for candidates representing political parties in each of the provinces in the general election for constituency members in the provinces.

Province	Member	Party	Notes
Bulawayo	Thokozani Khupe	MDC-T	
Bulawayo	Nicola Jane Watson	MDC-T	
Bulawayo	Gladys Mathe	MDC-T	Expelled from party on 17 March 2015.
Bulawayo	Dorothy Ndlovu	MDC-T	
Bulawayo	Eunice Nomthandazo Sandi Moyo	ZANU-PF	Expelled from Party on 22 January 2018.
Bulawayo	Jasmine Toffa	MDC	
Harare	Sabbina Zvenhando Thembani	ZANU-PF	
Harare	Sabina Mangwende	ZANU-PF	
Harare	Miriam Chikukwa	ZANU-PF	
Harare	Masaiti Evelyn Muzungu	MDC-T	Expelled from party on 17 March 2015.
Harare	Value Josephine Chitembwe	MDC-T	
Harare	Ronia Bunjira	MDC-T	Died on 15 April 2017
Manicaland	Oppah Muchinguri	ZANU-PF	
Manicaland	Esther Chikuni	ZANU-PF	
Manicaland	Annastazia Nyahwo	ZANU-PF	Member died April 2015
Manicaland	Lucia Chitura	ZANU-PF	
Manicaland	Fanny Chirisa	MDC-T	
Manicaland	Joyce Makonya	MDC-T	
Mashonaland Central	Gertrude Chibagu	ZANU-PF	
Mashonaland Central	Dorothy Apronia Kadungure	ZANU-PF	
Mashonaland Central	Elizabeth Shongedza	ZANU-PF	
Mashonaland Central	Dorothy Mashonganyika	ZANU-PF	
Mashonaland Central	Tsitsi Gezi	ZANU-PF	
Mashonaland Central	Bacillia Majaya	MDC-T	
Mashonaland East	Marbel Matirangana Nkatazo	ZANU-PF	
Mashonaland East	Getrude Hungwa	ZANU-PF	
Mashonaland East	Mabel Kaundikiza	ZANU-PF	
Mashonaland East	Lilian Zemura	ZANU-PF	
Mashonaland East	Roseline Roseweater Makoni	ZANU-PF	
Mashonaland East	Sipiwe Muchaneta Muchenje	MDC-T	
Mashonaland West	Goodluck Kwaramba	ZANU-PF	
Mashonaland West	Jennifer Nomsa Mhlanga	ZANU-PF	
Mashonaland West	Christina Nyere	ZANU-PF	
Mashonaland West	Constance Tsomondo	ZANU-PF	
Mashonaland West	Joan Tsogorani	ZANU-PF	Died on 21 September 2015
Mashonaland West	Consilia Chinanzvavana	MDC-T	
Masvingo	Annah Rungani	ZANU-PF	
Masvingo	Yeukai Simbanegavi	ZANU-PF	
Masvingo	Monica Chigudu	ZANU-PF	
Masvingo	Angeline Chipato	ZANU-PF	
Masvingo	Memory Munochinzwa	MDC-T	
Masvingo	Judith Muzhavazhe	MDC-T	Expelled from party on 17 March 2015.
Matabeleland North	Sibusisiwe Bhuda	MDC-T	
Matabeleland North	Mafoko Ruth Labode	MDC-T	
Matabeleland North	Lwazi Sibanda	MDC-T	
Matabeleland North	Sikhanyisiwe Mpofu	ZANU-PF	
Matabeleland North	Mail Nkomo	ZANU-PF	
Matabeleland North	Molly Mkandla	ZANU-PF	
Matabeleland South	Sipambekile Abigail Damasane	ZANU-PF	
Matabeleland South	Alice Ndlovu	ZANU-PF	
Matabeleland South	Rossy Mpofu	ZANU-PF	
Matabeleland South	Nomathemba Ndlovu	MDC-T	
Matabeleland South	Sipho Dube	MDC-T	
Matabeleland South	Priscilla Misihairabwi-Mushonga	MDC	
Midlands	Anastancia Ndlovu	ZANU-PF	Expelled from Party on 10 January 2018.
Midlands	Tariro Mtingwende	ZANU-PF	
Midlands	Philina Zhou	ZANU-PF	
Midlands	Tionei Melody Dziva	ZANU-PF	
Midlands	Emma Shanziwe Muzondiwa	MDC-T	
Midlands	Teti Banda	MDC-T	

== Senate ==
=== Composition of the Senate ===
The Senate is made up of 80 members, as well as the presiding officer, known as the President of the Senate, who is elected at the Senate's first sitting. A Senator who is elected as President of the Senate ceases to be a Senator, and the vacant seat must be filled in accordance with the Electoral Law.

Senate composition			
Affiliation	Elected in 2013	At dissolution in 2018	Change
ZANU–PF	37	37	Steady
MDC–T	21	20	▼1
MDC–N	2	2	Steady
Chiefs	18	18	Steady
Persons with disabilities	2	2	Steady
Total	80	79	▼1
Vacant	0	1	▲1
President of the Senate	1	1	Steady

=== Provincial Seats ===
There are 60 provincial seats in the Senate. Six are elected from each of the provinces into which Zimbabwe is divided, under a party-list system of proportional representation which is based on the votes cast for candidates representing political parties in each of the provinces in the general election for Members of the National Assembly. Male and female candidates are listed alternately, with every list being headed by a female candidate.

Province	Senator	Party	Notes
Bulawayo	Agnes Sibanda	MDC-T	
Bulawayo	Matson Mpofu Hlalo	MDC-T	Member expelled from party on 12 February 2016
Bulawayo	Siphiwe Ncube	MDC-T	
Bulawayo	Michael Norman Carter	MDC-T	
Bulawayo	Angeline Masuku	ZANU-PF	
Bulawayo	Dorothy Tholakele Khumalo	MDC	
Harare	Cleveria Chizema	ZANU-PF	
Harare	Charles Zvidzai Tawengwa	ZANU-PF	
Harare	Grace Tsitsi Jadagu	ZANU-PF	
Harare	Sekai Masikana Holland	MDC-T	Expelled from party on 17 March 2015.
Harare	James Makore	MDC-T	
Harare	Rorana Muchihwa	MDC-T	Expelled from party on 17 March 2015.
Manicaland	Monica Mutsvangwa	ZANU-PF	
Manicaland	Kumbirai Kangai	ZANU-PF	Died on 24 August 2013
Manicaland	Judith Mawire	ZANU-PF	
Manicaland	Michael Reuben Nyambuya	ZANU-PF	
Manicaland	Keresencia Chabuka	MDC-T	
Manicaland	Patrick Chitaka	MDC-T	Expelled from party on 17 March 2015.
Mashonaland Central	Alice Chimbudzi	ZANU-PF	
Mashonaland Central	Damiani Diamonds Enias Mumvuri	ZANU-PF	
Mashonaland Central	Jenia Manyeruke	ZANU-PF	
Mashonaland Central	Chenhamo Chakezha Chimutengwende	ZANU-PF	
Mashonaland Central	Monica Mavhunga	ZANU-PF	
Mashonaland Central	Martha Muronzi	MDC-T	
Mashonaland East	Olivia Nyembezi Muchena	ZANU-PF	Expelled from party on 21 May 2015
Mashonaland East	Sydney Tigere Sekeramayi	ZANU-PF	
Mashonaland East	Rosemary Goto	ZANU-PF	
Mashonaland East	David Pagwesese Parirenyatwa	ZANU-PF	
Mashonaland East	Address Matiirira	ZANU-PF	
Mashonaland East	Jane Chifamba	MDC-T	
Mashonaland West	Edna Madzongwe	ZANU-PF	Elected President of the Senate on 3 September 2013; seat automatically declared vacant.
Mashonaland West	Tapera Machingaifa	ZANU-PF	
Mashonaland West	Virginia Muchenje	ZANU-PF	Died on 28 October 2016
Mashonaland West	Mike Byton Musaka	ZANU-PF	
Mashonaland West	Priscah Mupfumira	ZANU-PF	
Mashonaland West	Violet Moeketsi	MDC-T	
Masvingo	Muhlawa Otilia Maluleko	ZANU-PF	
Masvingo	Dzikamai Calisto Mavhaire	ZANU-PF	Expelled from party on 21 May 2015
Masvingo	Shuvai Ben Mahofa	ZANU-PF	
Masvingo	Josiah Dunira Hungwe	ZANU-PF	
Masvingo	Farirai Ethel Mabhugu	MDC-T	
Masvingo	Misheck Marava	MDC-T	
Matabeleland North	Alphina Juba	MDC-T	Died on 9 July 2017
Matabeleland North	Hebert Madolo Sinampande	MDC-T	
Matabeleland North	Rosemary Nyathi	MDC-T	
Matabeleland North	Thokozile Angela Mathuthu	ZANU-PF	
Matabeleland North	Cain Mathema	ZANU-PF	
Matabeleland North	Medeline Bhebe	ZANU-PF	
Matabeleland South	Tambudzai Bhudagi Mohadi	ZANU-PF	
Matabeleland South	Simon Khaya Moyo	ZANU-PF	
Matabeleland South	Alma Mkhwebu	ZANU-PF	
Matabeleland South	Sithembile Mlotshwa	MDC-T	
Matabeleland South	Watchy Sibanda	MDC-T	Expelled from party on 17 March 2015.
Matabeleland South	Joyce Ndhlovu	MDC	
Midlands	Tsitsi Veronica Muzenda	ZANU-PF	
Midlands	Simbarashe Simbanenduku Mumbengegwi	ZANU-PF	
Midlands	Flora Buka	ZANU-PF	
Midlands	Jaison Max Kokerai Machaya	ZANU-PF	
Midlands	Lilian Timveos	MDC-T	
Midlands	Morgen Komichi	MDC-T	

=== Chiefs' seats ===
Chapter 6, Part 3, §120(b) and (c) of the Constitution of Zimbabwe reserves 16 seats in the Senate for Chiefs, of whom two are elected by the provincial assembly of Chiefs from each of the provinces, other than the metropolitan provinces, and two for the President and Deputy President of the National Council of Chiefs.

Elected by Provincial Assembly of Chiefs for	Traditional Chief's Name	Name of Chief	Notes
President of the Council of Chiefs (ex officio)		Fortune Charumbira	
Deputy President of the Council of Chiefs (ex officio)		Lucas Mtshane Khumalo	
Manicaland	Chiduku	Rivai Mbaimbai	
Manicaland	Gwenzi	Daniel Gwenzi	
Mashonaland Central	Chisunga	Daster Chisunga	
Mashonaland Central	Nembire	Clemence Nyabvunzi	
Mashonaland East	Musarurwa	Enos Masakwa	
Mashonaland East	Nyamukoho	Samson Katsande	
Mashonaland West	Dandawa	Try Manyepa	
Mashonaland West	Nebiri	Wilson Nebiri	
Masvingo	Chitanga	Felani Chauke	
Masvingo	Marozva	Phillip Mudhe	
Matabeleland North	Gampu	Ashel Gampu Sithole	
Matabeleland North	Siansali	Siatabwa Nkatazo	
Matabeleland South	Nyangazonke	Vuyani Ndiweni	
Matabeleland South	Masendu	Siandalizwe Dube	
Midlands	Ngungumbane	Zama Nthua Mkwananzi	
Midlands	Ntabeni	Milton Ntabeni	

=== Persons with disabilities ===
Chapter 6, Part 3, §120(d) of the Constitution of Zimbabwe reserves two seats in the Senate for representatives of persons with disabilities. In terms of paragraph 3(3)(b) of the Seventh Schedule to the Electoral Act [Chapter 2:13], one must be male, the other must be female. These Senators are elected by the National Disability Board.

Gender	Senator	Notes
Female	Annah Shiri	
Male	Nyamayabo Mashavakure	

== By-elections, replacements and recalls ==
=== Constituency by-elections ===
Constituency	Province	Date	Party of incumbent before vacancy	Outgoing member	Reason for by-election	Party of incumbent after election	Member returned
Chirumanzu-Zibagwe	MID	27 March 2015	ZANU-PF	Emmerson Mnangagwa	Member appointed Vice-President	ZANU-PF	Auxillia Mnangagwa
Mount Darwin West	MSW	27 March 2015	ZANU-PF	Joice Mujuru	Member appointed Vice-President	ZANU-PF	Barnwell Seremwe
Wedza North	MSE	16 May 2015	ZANU-PF	Simon Kundai Musanhu	Death of member on 15 January 2015	ZANU-PF	David Musabayana
Lobengula	BYO	11 June 2015	MDC-T	Nkomo Samuel Sipepa	Member expelled from party on 17 March 2015	ZANU-PF	Maideyi Mpala
Luveve	BYO	11 June 2015	MDC-T	Reggie Moyo	Member expelled from party on 17 March 2015	ZANU-PF	Ntandoyenkosi Mlilo
Makokoba	BYO	11 June 2015	MDC-T	Gorden Moyo	Member expelled from party on 17 March 2015	ZANU-PF	Tshinga Judge Dube
Pelandaba–Mpopoma	BYO	11 June 2015	MDC-T	Bekithemba Nyathi	Member expelled from party on 17 March 2015	ZANU-PF	Joseph Tshuma
Pumula	BYO	11 June 2015	MDC-T	Albert Mhlanga	Member expelled from party on 17 March 2015	ZANU-PF	Godfrey Malaba Ncube
Dzivarasekwa	HRE	11 June 2015	MDC-T	Solomon Madzore	Member expelled from party on 17 March 2015	ZANU-PF	Omega Sipani-Hungwe
Glen View South	HRE	11 June 2015	MDC-T	Paul Madzore	Member expelled from party on 17 March 2015	ZANU-PF	Pius Madzinga
Harare East	HRE	11 June 2015	MDC-T	Tendai Laxton Biti	Member expelled from party on 17 March 2015	ZANU-PF	Terence Mukupe
Highfield West	HRE	11 June 2015	MDC-T	Manyengavana Moses	Member expelled from party on 17 March 2015	ZANU-PF	Psychology Maziwisa
Kambuzuma	HRE	11 June 2015	MDC-T	Willias Madzimure	Member expelled from party on 17 March 2015	ZANU-PF	Tinashe Maduza
Kuwadzana	HRE	11 June 2015	MDC-T	Lucia Gladys Matibenga	Member expelled from party on 17 March 2015	ZANU-PF	Betty Nhambu
Dangamvura–Chikanga	MCL	11 June 2015	MDC-T	Arnold Tsunga	Member expelled from party on 17 March 2015	ZANU-PF	Isau Fungai Mupfumi
Headlands	MCL	11 June 2015	ZANU-PF	Didymus Noel Mutasa	Member expelled from party on 18 February 2015	ZANU-PF	Christopher Peter Chingosho
Hurungwe West	MSW	11 June 2015	ZANU-PF	Temba Peter Mliswa	Member expelled from party on 18 February 2015	ZANU-PF	Keith Never Guzah
Tsholotsho North	MBN	11 June 2015	MDC-T	Roseline Nkomo	Member expelled from party on 17 March 2015	ZANU-PF	Jonathan Nathaniel Moyo
Mbizo	MID	11 June 2015	MDC-T	Settlement Chikwinya	Member expelled from party on 17 March 2015	ZANU-PF	Vongaishe Mupereri
Mudzi West	MSE	25 July 2015	ZANU-PF	Aqualinah Katsande	Death of member on 28 March 2015	ZANU-PF	Magna Mudyiwa
Mwenezi East	MVG	19 September 2015	ZANU-PF	Kudakwashe Tshuma Bhasikiti	Member expelled from party on 21 May 2015	ZANU-PF	Joshua Moyo
Epworth	HRE	20 September 2015	ZANU-PF	Amos Bernard Muvengwa Midzi	Death of member on 9 June 2015	ZANU-PF	Zalerah Hazvineyi Makari
Marondera Central	MSE	20 September 2015	ZANU-PF	Ray Joseph Kaukonde	Member expelled from party on 21 May 2015	ZANU-PF	Lawrence Katsiru
Mbire	MSC	20 September 2015	ZANU-PF	David Butau	Member expelled from party on 21 May 2015	ZANU-PF	Douglas Karoro
Nkulumane	BYO	19 December 2015	MDC-T	Tamsanqa Mahlangu	Death of member on 5 October 2015	ZANU-PF	Killian Sibanda
Mhondoro-Mubaira	MSW	6 March 2016	ZANU-PF	Sylvester Robert Nguni	Member expelled from party on 1 December 2015	ZANU-PF	George Gangarahwe
Guruve South	MSC	24 April 2016	ZANU-PF	Chriswell Mutematsaka	Member expelled from party on 20 January 2015	ZANU-PF	Patrick Dutiro
Mazowe North	MSC	24 July 2016	ZANU-PF	Edgar Chidavaenzi	Death of member on 17 March 2016	ZANU-PF	Martin Dinha
Norton	MSW	22 August 2016	ZANU-PF	Christopher Mutsvangwa	Member expelled from party on 6 July 2016	Independent	Temba Peter Mliswa
Chimanimani West	MCL	27 November 2016	ZANU-PF	Munacho Thomas Alvar Mutezo	Member expelled from party on 6 July 2016	ZANU-PF	Nokuthula Matsikenyere
Bikita West	MVG	22 January 2017	ZANU-PF	Munyaradzi Kereke	Member convicted and sentenced to 10 years’ imprisonment on 11 July 2016	ZANU-PF	Beauty Chabaya
Mwenezi East	MVG	9 April 2017	ZANU-PF	Joshua Moyo	Death of member on 22 December 2016	ZANU-PF	Omar Joosbi
Chiwundura	MID	16 July 2017	ZANU-PF	Kizito Chivamba	Death of member on 19 April 2017	ZANU-PF	Brown Ndlovu
Makoni South	MCL	—N/a	ZANU-PF	Mandi Manditawepi Chimene	Member expelled from Party on 27 November 2017	No by-election held	
Makoni West	MCL	—N/a	ZANU-PF	Kudzanai Chipanga	Member expelled from Party on 27 November 2017	No by-election held	
Tsholotsho North	MBN	—N/a	ZANU-PF	Jonathan Moyo	Member expelled from Party on 27 November 2017	No by-election held	
Zvimba North	MSW	—N/a	ZANU-PF	Ignatius Chombo	Member expelled from Party on 27 November 2017	No by-election held	
Mount Darwin South	MSC	—N/a	ZANU-PF	Saviour Kasukuwere	Member expelled from Party on 27 November 2017	No by-election held	
Mberengwa East	MID	—N/a	ZANU-PF	Makhosini Hlongwane	Member expelled from Party on 10 January 2018	No by-election held	
Shurugwi South	MID	—N/a	ZANU-PF	Tapiwanashe Matangaidze	Member expelled from Party on 10 January 2018	No by-election held	
Harare South	HRE	—N/a	ZANU-PF	Shadreck Mashayamombe	Member expelled from Party on 10 January 2018	No by-election held	
Rushinga	MSC	—N/a	ZANU-PF	Wonder Mashange	Member expelled from Party on 10 January 2018	No by-election held	
Masvingo Urban	MVG	—N/a	ZANU-PF	Daniel Kuzozvireva Shumba	Member expelled from Party on 10 January 2018	No by-election held	
Masvingo South	MVG	—N/a	ZANU-PF	Walter Mzembi	Member expelled from Party on 10 January 2018	No by-election held	
Bikita South	MVG	—N/a	ZANU-PF	Jeppy Jaboon	Member expelled from Party on 10 January 2018	No by-election held	
Gutu South	MVG	—N/a	ZANU-PF	Paul Chimedza	Member expelled from Party on 10 January 2018	No by-election held	
Hurungwe East	MSW	—N/a	ZANU-PF	Sarah Mahoka	Member expelled from Party on 10 January 2018	No by-election held	
Chimanimani East	MCL	—N/a	ZANU-PF	Samuel Undenge	Member expelled from Party on 10 January 2018	No by-election held	
Zaka East	MVG	—N/a	ZANU-PF	Samson Mukanduri	Death of member on 22 January 2018	No by-election held	

=== Women's Quota replacements ===
Province	Replacement Date	Party of incumbent before vacancy	Outgoing member	Reason for vacancy	Party of incumbent after substitution	Member returned
MCL	3 August 2015	ZANU-PF	Annastazia Nyahwo	Death of member April 2015	ZANU-PF	Kereniya Uta
HRE	16 June 2015	MDC-T	Muzungu Masaiti Evelyn	Member expelled from party on 17 March 2015	MDC-T	Susan Matsunga
BYO	16 June 2015	MDC-T	Gladys Mathe	Member expelled from party on 17 March 2015	MDC-T	Nomvulo Mguni
MVG	16 June 2015	MDC-T	Judith Muzhavazhe	Member expelled from party on 17 March 2015	MDC-T	Machirairwa Mugidho
MSW	19 February 2016	ZANU-PF	Joan Tsogorani	Death of member on 21 September 2015	ZANU-PF	Josephine Shava
HRE	28 July 2017	MDC-T	Ronia Bunjira	Death of member on 15 April 2017	MDC-T	Revayi Muguti
MID	—N/a	ZANU-PF	Anastancia Ndlovu	Member expelled from Party on 10 January 2018	Member not replaced	
BYO	—N/a	ZANU-PF	Eunice Nomthandazo Sandi Moyo	Member expelled from Party on 22 January 2018	Member not replaced	

=== Senate replacements ===
Quota	Province	Replacement Date	Representing	Outgoing member	Reason for vacancy	Representing	Member returned
Provincial	MSW	23 January 2015	ZANU-PF	Edna Madzongwe	Member elected President of the Senate on 3 September 2013	ZANU-PF	Hildah Bhobho
Provincial	MCL	27 March 2015	ZANU-PF	Kumbirai Kangai	Death of member on 24 August 2013	ZANU-PF	Tongesayi Shadreck Chipanga
Provincial	HRE	16 June 2015	MDC-T	Sekai Masikana Holland	Member expelled from party on 17 March 2015	MDC-T	Anna Chimanikire
Provincial	HRE	16 June 2015	MDC-T	Rorana Muchihwa	Member expelled from party on 17 March 2015	MDC-T	Theresa Maonei Makone
Provincial	MCL	16 June 2015	MDC-T	Patrick Chitaka	Member expelled from party on 17 March 2015	MDC-T	David Antony Chimhini
Provincial	MBS	16 June 2015	MDC-T	Watchy Sibanda	Member expelled from party on 17 March 2015	MDC-T	Beki Sibanda
Provincial	MVG	18 December 2015	ZANU-PF	Dzikamai Mavhaire	Member expelled from party on 21 May 2015	ZANU-PF	Clemence Makwarimba
Provincial	BYO	29 April 2016	MDC-T	Matson Hlalo	Member expelled from party on 12 February 2016	MDC-T	Victor Mapungwana
Provincial	MSE	29 April 2016	ZANU-PF	Olivia Muchena	Member expelled from party on 21 May 2015	ZANU-PF	Tabeth Murwira
Provincial	MSW	6 March 2017	ZANU-PF	Virginia Muchenje	Death of member on 28 October 2016	ZANU-PF	Caroline Tsitsi Mugabe
Provincial	BYO	30 June 2017	MDC-T	Victor Mapungwana	Death of member on 17 February 2017	MDC-T	Gideon Shoko
Provincial	MBN	—N/a	MDC-T	Alphina Juba	Death of member on 9 July 2017	Member not replaced	
