= Results of the 2013 Zimbabwean general election =

- 31 July 2013
- Presidential election
- Registered: 6,187,003 (Note: The last breakdown of registered voters was published on 9 July 2013, but this was not the one used during the elections. On 22 July the Registrar General announced in The Herald that the total had come to 6.4 million, without providing a breakdown.)
- Turnout: 56.25% (Note: Based on the last confirmed total of registered voters at 9 July 2013.)
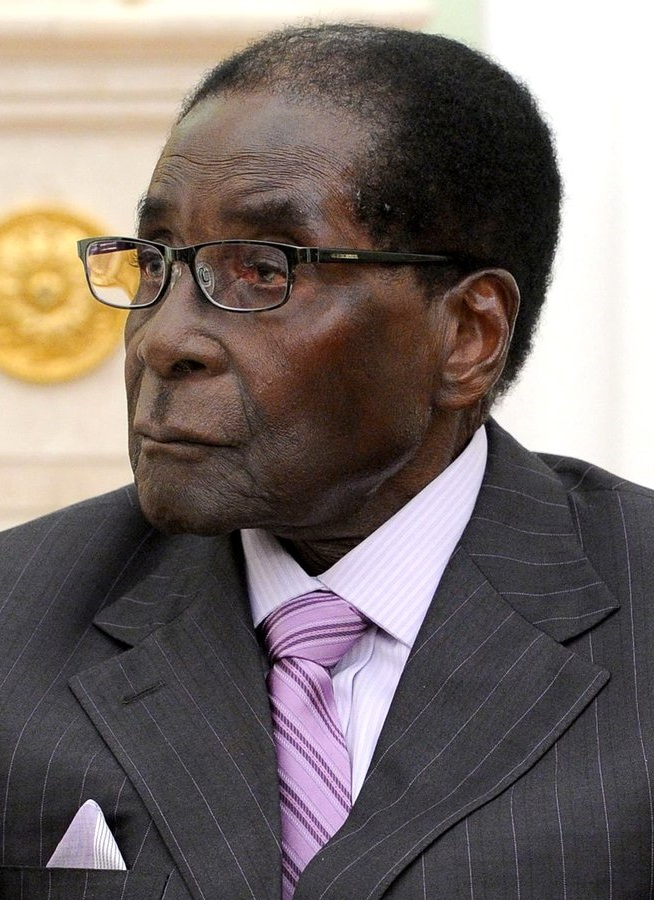

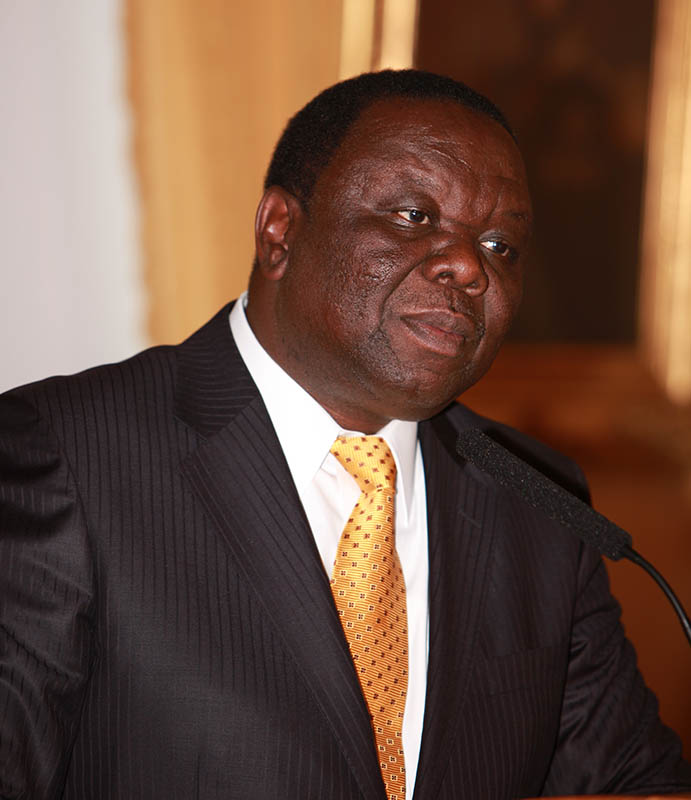
Candidate	Robert Mugabe	Morgan Tsvangirai
Party	ZANU–PF	MDC-T
Popular vote	2,110,434	1,172,349
Percentage	61.88%	34.37%
President before election
Robert Mugabe
ZANU–PF
Elected President
Robert Mugabe
ZANU–PF
- National Assembly
- All 270 seats in the National Assembly; 136 seats needed for a majority
Party	Leader	Vote %	Seats	+/–
ZANU–PF	Robert Mugabe	62.93	197	+98
MDC-T	Morgan Tsvangirai	30.24	70	−30
MDC	Welshman Ncube	4.70	2	−8
Independent	Jonathan Tawonana Samukange	1.34	1	0
This lists parties that won seats. See the complete results below.
- Senate
- 60 of the 80 seats in the Senate; 41 seats needed for a majority
Party	Leader	Seats	+/–
ZANU–PF	Robert Mugabe	37	+7
MDC-T	Morgan Tsvangirai	21	−3
MDC	Welshman Ncube	2	−4
This lists parties that won seats. See the complete results below.
- Maps

The 2013 Zimbabwean general election was held in Zimbabwe on 31 July 2013 for the presidency and to set the membership of the 8th Parliament, consisting of the Senate and National Assembly. These were the first elections conducted under the rules of the new Constitution of Zimbabwe which had been approved in the 2013 Zimbabwean constitutional referendum.

While the polls were conducted peacefully and with high voter turnout in many areas, the announcement and validation of results were marred by substantial controversies, particularly concerning transparency, the integrity of the voters' roll, and allegations of systematic irregularities that undermined the credibility of the outcome in the eyes of opposition parties, domestic observers, and some international stakeholders.

== Overview ==
The Zimbabwe Electoral Commission (ZEC) announced results progressively from constituency level upwards, with the presidential outcome declared on 3 August 2013, within the constitutionally mandated five-day period. The process involved posting results at polling stations (V.11 forms), collation at ward and constituency centres, and final aggregation at provincial and national command centres. Although election day itself was largely peaceful and orderly, with observers noting efficient counting at polling stations and the presence of party agents, significant pre- and post-election flaws dominated discourse on the results' legitimacy.

Key contentions included the chaotic voter registration exercise, a deeply flawed voters' roll characterised by urban disenfranchisement and rural over-registration, high numbers of turned-away and assisted voters, and ZEC's refusal to publish comprehensive polling-station-level results or full tabulation chains. Domestic observers, particularly the Zimbabwe Election Support Network (ZESN), described the process as "seriously compromised" by systematic efforts to disenfranchise urban voters (predominantly opposition supporters), estimating up to a million potential voters affected. Opposition parties alleged orchestrated manipulation, including involvement of foreign entities in voters' roll preparation, while regional bodies such as the African Union (AU) and Southern African Development Community (SADC) acknowledged irregularities but deemed the elections a credible expression of the popular will.

== Presidential results ==
Presidential election results by constituency. No individual constituency results were released for five provinces. Robert Mugabe Morgan Tsvangirai

The presidential results were announced nationally on 3 August 2013 by ZEC, drawing immediate rejection from the main opposition challenger, Morgan Tsvangirai of the Movement for Democratic Change – Tsvangirai (MDC-T), who labelled the poll a "sham" and "huge farce". Tsvangirai filed a petition with the Constitutional Court on 9 August seeking nullification, citing widespread irregularities, but withdrew it a week later, alleging judicial bias, lack of access to electoral materials, and an unfair hearing. The Constitutional Court refused withdrawal, proceeded to hear the matter, and on 20 August upheld the results as free, fair, and credible, confirming the declared winner.

Central disputes centred on the voters' roll, which ZEC provided to parties only days before polling in hard-copy form, hindering analysis. Analyses revealed stark urban-rural disparities: approximately 99.97% of potential rural voters registered versus 67.94% in urban areas, resulting in an estimated 750,000–1,000,000 missing urban voters. The roll contained duplicates, deceased persons (including thousands over age 100 in a country with low life expectancy), and over-representation of elderly rural voters. Allegations surfaced that the Israeli firm Nikuv International Projects, contracted for voter registration systems, manipulated the roll to include ghost voters and displace opposition supporters, though these remained unproven in court.

On election day, over 300,000 voters (nearly 9% of valid votes) were turned away, predominantly in urban MDC-T strongholds, often for wrong wards or absent names despite possessing registration slips. Special voting for security forces and officials was chaotic, raising double-voting fears as names were not consistently struck off main rolls. High assisted-voter rates (around 6%, disproportionately rural) fuelled coercion claims, with reports of traditional leaders or officials influencing illiterate or vulnerable voters.

Although observers found no evidence of tabulation fraud at polling stations, the absence of centrally published polling-station results prevented independent verification of aggregation. ZEC's national command centre controlled final collation, but protocols were not fully disclosed, prompting accusations of opacity.

Constituency breakdown of the presidential results for five of the ten provinces were later published by ZEC on their website ahead of the 2018 elections, though the results of the remaining five provinces were never made public.

=== Summary ===
Candidate	Party	Votes	%
Robert Mugabe	ZANU–PF	2,110,434	61.88
Morgan Tsvangirai	MDC–Tsvangirai	1,172,349	34.37
Welshman Ncube	MDC–Ncube	92,637	2.72
Dumiso Dabengwa	Zimbabwe African People's Union	25,416	0.75
Kisinoti Mukwazhe	Zimbabwe Development Party	9,931	0.29
Total		3,410,767	100.00
Valid votes		3,410,767	98.01
Invalid/blank votes		69,280	1.99
Total votes		3,480,047	100.00
Registered voters/turnout		6,187,003	56.25
Source: NORDEM

=== Results by province ===
Results by province
Province	Dumiso Dabengwa		Robert Gabriel Mugabe		Mukwazhe Munodei Kisinoti		Welshman Ncube		Morgan Tsvangirai		Total votes rejected		Ballot paper unaccounted for	Total votes cast	Total valid votes cast	Voter population at 9 July	Voter turnout %
Province	ZAPU		ZANU-PF		ZDP		MDC		MDC-Tsvangirai		Total votes rejected		Ballot paper unaccounted for	Total votes cast	Total valid votes cast	Voter population at 9 July	Voter turnout %
Province	Votes	%	Votes	%	Votes	%	Votes	%	Votes	%	Votes	%	Ballot paper unaccounted for	Total votes cast	Total valid votes cast	Voter population at 9 July	Voter turnout %
Bulawayo	1,926	1.44	31,773	23.76	159	0.12	9,356	7.00	89,207	66.72	1,277	0.96	4	133,698	132,421	310,390	43.07
Harare	843	0.19	172,163	38.32	361	0.08	7,846	1.75	261,925	58.30	6,167	1.37	19	449,305	443,138	798,264	56.29
Manicaland	3,374	0.72	258,026	55.14	1,514	0.32	13,433	2.87	180,552	38.59	11,033	2.36	2	467,932	456,899	798,677	58.59
Mashonaland Central	2,182	0.56	327,455	84.62	615	0.16	3,525	0.91	46,533	12.02	6,678	1.73	12	386,988	380,310	568,600	68.06
Mashonaland East	2,212	0.52	320,719	75.14	795	0.19	6,231	1.46	90,165	21.12	6,731	1.58		426,853	420,122	710,323	60.09
Mashonaland West	2,066	0.52	277,312	70.35	883	0.22	5,603	1.42	100,616	25.53	7,683	1.95		394,163	386,480	656,036	60.08
Masvingo	3,855	0.93	285,806	68.74	1,515	0.36	9,878	2.38	104,912	25.23	9,804	2.36		415,770	405,966	769,263	54.05
Matabeleland North	3,034	1.49	81,207	39.87	1,352	0.66	13,003	6.38	98,596	48.41	6,490	3.19		203,682	197,192	383,267	53.14
Matabeleland South	2,776	1.73	81,180	50.71	1,166	0.73	12,726	7.95	58,633	36.63	3,592	2.24		160,073	156,481	371,143	43.13
Midlands	3,148	0.71	274,793	62.23	1,571	0.36	11,036	2.50	141,210	31.98	9,825	2.22	16	441,583	431,755	821,040	53.78
National total	25,416	0.73	2,110,434	60.64	9,931	0.29	92,637	2.66	1,172,349	33.69	69,280	1.99	53	3,480,047	3,410,764	6,187,003	56.25

=== Results by constituency ===
Results by constituency
Constituency	Province	Dumiso Dabengwa		Robert Gabriel Mugabe		Mukwazhe Munodei Kisinoti		Welshman Ncube		Morgan Tsvangirai		Total votes rejected		Ballot paper unaccounted for	Total votes cast	Total valid votes vcast
Constituency	Province	ZAPU		ZANU-PF		ZDP		MDC		MDC-Tsvangirai		Total votes rejected		Ballot paper unaccounted for	Total votes cast	Total valid votes vcast
Constituency	Province	Votes	%	Votes	%	Votes	%	Votes	%	Votes	%	Votes	%	Ballot paper unaccounted for	Total votes cast	Total valid votes vcast
Beitbridge East	MBS	No data														
Beitbridge West	MBS	No data														
Bikita East	MVG	No data														
Bikita South	MVG	No data														
Bikita West	MVG	No data														
Bindura North	MSC	113	0.37	22,552	74.22	20	0.07	178	0.59	7,115	23.42	406	1.34	5	30,384	29,978
Bindura South	MSC	109	0.51	14,709	68.19	37	0.17	409	1.90	5,997	27.80	309	1.43	0	21,570	21,261
Binga North	MBN	No data														
Binga South	MBN	No data														
Bubi	MBN	No data														
Budiriro	HRE	33	0.16	5,915	28.27	10	0.05	398	1.90	14,284	68.26	286	1.37	0	20,926	20,640
Buhera Central	MCL	173	0.97	10,728	60.37	75	0.42	585	3.29	5,456	30.70	753	4.24	0	17,770	17,017
Buhera North	MCL	86	0.54	9,406	59.00	33	0.21	399	2.50	5,636	35.35	383	2.40	0	15,943	15,560
Buhera South	MCL	191	0.97	11,881	60.04	73	0.37	621	3.14	6,470	32.69	553	2.79	0	19,789	19236
Buhera West	MCL	113	0.61	9,784	53.12	32	0.17	487	2.64	7,653	41.55	351	1.91	0	18,420	18,069
Bulawayo Central	BYO	143	1.26	2,909	25.64	16	0.14	809	7.13	7,361	64.88	108	0.95	3	11,346	11,238
Bulawayo East	BYO	149	1.21	3,325	26.94	15	0.12	1,145	9.28	7,577	61.39	132	1.07	0	12,343	12,211
Bulawayo South	BYO	106	1.09	1,960	20.09	8	0.08	519	5.32	7,047	72.22	118	1.21	0	9,758	9,640
Bulilima East	MBS	No data														
Bulilima West	MBS	No data														
Chakari	MSW	No data														
Chegutu East	MSW	No data														
Chegutu West	MSW	No data														
Chikomba Central	MSE	No data														
Chikomba East	MSE	No data														
Chikomba West	MSE	No data														
Chimanimani East	MCL	206	1.09	12,652	66.76	62	0.33	554	2.92	4,902	25.87	575	3.03	0	18,951	18,376
Chimanimani West	MCL	95	0.52	10,097	55.29	40	0.22	596	3.26	7,046	38.58	389	2.13	0	18,263	17,874
Chinhoyi	MSW	No data														
Chipinge Central	MCL	143	0.76	12,678	67.67	41	0.22	323	1.72	5,167	27.58	383	2.04	0	18,735	18,352
Chipinge East	MCL	142	0.98	7,140	49.43	93	0.64	801	5.54	5,822	40.30	448	3.10	0	14,446	13,998
Chipinge South	MCL	153	0.95	8,259	51.29	134	0.83	911	5.66	5,988	37.19	656	4.07	0	16,101	15,445
Chipinge West	MCL	118	0.86	6,649	48.65	53	0.39	468	3.42	6,054	44.29	326	2.39	0	13,668	13,342
Chiredzi East	MVG	No data														
Chiredzi North	MVG	No data														
Chiredzi South	MVG	No data														
Chiredzi West	MVG	No data														
Chirumanzu	MID	82	0.57	8,449	58.49	61	0.42	478	3.31	5,086	35.21	291	2.01	0	14,445	14,154
Chirumanzu-Zibagwe	MID	81	0.37	17,736	81.40	32	0.15	131	0.60	3,296	15.13	513	2.35	7	21,789	21,276
Chitungwiza North	HRE	20	0.13	6,332	40.20	10	0.06	182	1.16	9,075	57.61	133	0.84	0	15,752	15,619
Chitungwiza South	HRE	32	0.18	7,629	43.29	10	0.06	204	1.16	9,558	54.24	188	1.07	4	17,621	17,433
Chivi Central	MVG	No data														
Chivi North	MVG	No data														
Chivi South	MVG	No data														
Chiwundura	MID	84	0.41	11,802	57.52	31	0.15	310	1.51	7,991	38.95	300	1.46	0	20,518	20,218
Dangamvura-Chikanga	MCL	64	0.24	9,791	37.33	21	0.08	252	0.96	15,854	60.45	245	0.93	2	26,227	25,982
Dzivarasekwa	HRE	30	0.22	5,498	40.56	15	0.11	331	2.44	7,467	55.09	213	1.57	0	13,554	13,341
Emakhandeni-Entumbane	BYO	106	1.14	2,088	22.44	15	0.16	719	7.73	6,297	67.68	79	0.85	0	9,304	9,225
Epworth	HRE	35	0.14	14,652	56.75	29	0.11	421	1.63	10,038	38.88	645	2.50	0	25,820	25,175
Glen Norah	HRE	11	0.12	2,031	21.41	6	0.06	199	2.10	7,136	75.21	105	1.11	0	9,488	9,383
Glenview North	HRE	11	0.10	2,401	22.51	10	0.09	212	1.99	7,943	74.47	89	0.83	0	10,666	10,577
Glenview South	HRE	20	0.17	2,687	22.38	14	0.12	329	2.74	8,810	73.39	145	1.21	0	12,005	11,860
Gokwe Central	MID	101	0.70	8,848	61.14	61	0.42	354	2.45	4,889	33.78	219	1.51	0	14,472	14,253
Gokwe Chireya	MID	193	1.09	13,661	77.46	83	0.47	359	2.04	2,804	15.90	537	3.04	0	17,637	17,100
Gokwe Gumunyu	MID	84	0.61	11,250	81.05	39	0.28	414	2.98	1,872	13.49	222	1.60	0	13,881	13,659
Gokwe Kabuyuni	MID	219	1.32	9,707	58.35	94	0.57	518	3.11	5,432	32.65	667	4.01	0	16,637	15,970
Gokwe Kana	MID	153	1.08	9,378	66.44	54	0.38	474	3.36	3,597	25.48	459	3.25	0	14,115	13,656
Gokwe Mapfungautsi	MID	160	0.87	12,511	68.00	246	1.34	613	3.33	4,308	23.41	561	3.05	0	18,399	17,838
Gokwe Nembudziya	MID	106	0.64	11,765	71.55	64	0.39	296	1.80	3,859	23.47	354	2.15	1	16,444	16,090
Gokwe Sasame	MID	177	1.00	10,430	59.09	92	0.52	577	3.27	5,859	33.20	515	2.92	0	17,650	17,135
Gokwe Sengwa	MID	122	0.99	9,064	73.39	71	0.57	314	2.54	2,496	20.21	284	2.30	0	12,351	12,067
Goromonzi North	MSE	No data														
Goromonzi South	MSE	No data														
Goromonzi West	MSE	No data														
Guruve North	MSC	173	0.69	21,809	87.05	58	0.23	258	1.03	2,422	9.67	333	1.33	0	25,053	24,720
Guruve South	MSC	185	0.84	18,681	84.91	45	0.20	309	1.40	2,324	10.56	458	2.08	0	22,002	21,544
Gutu Central	MVG	No data														
Gutu East	MVG	No data														
Gutu North	MVG	No data														
Gutu South	MVG	No data														
Gutu West	MVG	No data														
Gwanda Central	MBS	No data														
Gwanda North	MBS	No data														
Gwanda South	MBS	No data														
Gweru Urban	MID	51	0.33	6,203	40.66	16	0.10	223	1.46	8,613	56.46	149	0.98	4	15,255	15,106
Harare Central	HRE	32	0.25	5,237	40.63	5	0.04	171	1.33	7,326	56.83	120	0.93	0	12,891	12,771
Harare East	HRE	41	0.22	8,310	44.08	16	0.08	286	1.52	9,887	52.44	314	1.67	1	18,854	18,540
Harare North	HRE	37	0.23	6,986	43.42	15	0.09	240	1.49	8,580	53.33	230	1.43	0	16,088	15,858
Harare South	HRE	74	0.25	19,164	64.24	31	0.10	422	1.41	9,519	31.91	624	2.09	0	29,834	29,210
Harare West	HRE	32	0.22	3,717	25.54	6	0.04	217	1.49	10,445	71.76	138	0.95	1	14,555	14,417
Hatfield	HRE	26	0.18	4,179	29.47	11	0.08	189	1.33	9,611	67.77	165	1.16	0	14,181	14,016
Headlands	MCL	123	0.74	11,876	71.22	39	0.23	344	2.06	3,933	23.59	360	2.16	0	16,675	16,315
Highfield East	HRE	26	0.20	3,761	28.37	6	0.05	279	2.10	9,016	68.00	170	1.28	0	13,258	13,088
Highfield West	HRE	18	0.17	2,692	25.48	8	0.08	251	2.38	7,429	70.30	169	1.60	0	10,567	10,398
Hurungwe Central	MSW	No data														
Hurungwe East	MSW	No data														
Hurungwe North	MSW	No data														
Hurungwe West	MSW	No data														
Hwange Central	MBN	No data														
Hwange East	MBN	No data														
Hwange West	MBN	No data														
Insiza North	MBS	No data														
Insiza South	MBS	No data														
Kadoma Central	MSW	No data														
Kambuzuma	HRE	27	0.21	4,066	30.91	12	0.09	217	1.65	8,672	65.93	160	1.22	1	13,154	12,994
Kariba	MSW	No data														
Kuwadzana	HRE	19	0.13	4,256	30.12	8	0.06	330	2.34	9,392	66.47	124	0.88	0	14,129	14,005
Kuwadzana East	HRE	18	0.16	2,663	23.69	7	0.06	257	2.29	8,164	72.63	132	1.17	0	11,241	11,109
Kwekwe Central	MID	37	0.30	5,477	43.82	12	0.10	259	2.07	6,514	52.12	199	1.59	0	12,498	12,296
Lobengula	BYO	95	1.06	1,920	21.49	9	0.10	548	6.13	6,277	70.26	85	0.95	0	8,934	8,849
Lupane East	MBN	No data														
Lupane West	MBN	No data														
Luveve	BYO	220	1.63	3,132	23.22	13	0.10	1,060	7.86	8,954	66.38	111	0.82	1	13,490	13,379
Mabvuku-Tafara	HRE	51	0.32	5,383	33.79	17	0.11	443	2.78	9,606	60.29	432	2.71	0	15,932	15,500
Magunje	MSW	No data														
Magwegwe	BYO	162	1.82	1,599	17.97	13	0.15	979	11.00	6,100	68.55	46	0.52	0	8,899	8,853
Makokoba	BYO	137	1.08	3,277	25.82	16	0.13	717	5.65	8,412	66.27	134	1.06	0	12,693	12,559
Makonde	MSW	No data														
Makoni Central	MCL	93	0.60	7,742	49.71	26	0.17	292	1.88	7,161	45.98	259	1.66	0	15,573	15,314
Makoni North	MCL	121	0.81	9,499	63.49	57	0.38	355	2.37	4,457	29.79	473	3.16	0	14,962	14,489
Makoni South	MCL	165	0.97	9,891	58.03	63	0.37	465	2.73	6,108	35.84	352	2.07	0	17,044	16,692
Makoni West	MCL	99	0.75	7,595	57.66	43	0.33	436	3.31	4,743	36.01	257	1.95	0	13,173	12,916
Mangwe	MBS	No data														
Maramba Pfungwe	MSE	No data														
Marondera Central	MSE	No data														
Marondera East	MSE	No data														
Marondera West	MSE	No data														
Masvingo Central	MVG	No data														
Masvingo North	MVG	No data														
Masvingo South	MVG	No data														
Masvingo Urban	MVG	No data														
Masvingo West	MVG	No data														
Matobo North	MBS	No data														
Matobo South	MBS	No data														
Mazowe Central	MSC	127	0.80	10,534	66.44	36	0.23	397	2.50	4,385	27.66	376	2.37	0	15,855	15,479
Mazowe North	MSC	155	1.00	12,794	82.44	29	0.19	137	0.88	2,066	13.31	338	2.18	0	15,519	15,181
Mazowe South	MSC	100	0.59	10,901	64.82	49	0.29	297	1.77	5,167	30.72	303	1.80	0	16,817	16,514
Mazowe West	MSC	100	0.60	13,886	83.73	29	0.17	127	0.77	2,160	13.02	283	1.71	0	16,585	16,302
Mbare	HRE	40	0.15	13,762	50.49	25	0.09	445	1.63	12,573	46.13	413	1.52	0	27,258	26,845
Mberengwa East	MID	140	1.16	8,839	73.23	61	0.51	315	2.61	2,421	20.06	295	2.44	0	12,071	11,776
Mberengwa North	MID	124	0.69	14,488	80.66	33	0.18	282	1.57	2,674	14.89	360	2.00	0	17,961	17,601
Mberengwa South	MID	128	0.88	11,985	82.67	35	0.24	212	1.46	1,890	13.04	247	1.70	0	14,497	14,250
Mberengwa West	MID	128	1.26	7,013	68.76	39	0.38	332	3.26	2,329	22.84	358	3.51	0	10,199	9,841
Mbire	MSC	264	1.12	18,981	80.73	69	0.29	390	1.66	3,070	13.06	737	3.13	0	23,511	22,774
Mbizo	MID	21	0.16	5,325	40.83	9	0.07	253	1.94	7,241	55.52	194	1.49	0	13,043	12,849
Mhangura	MSW	No data														
Mhondoro-Mubaira	MSW	No data														
Mhondoro-Ngezi	MSW	No data														
Mkoba	MID	36	0.23	5,342	33.98	9	0.06	184	1.17	9,991	63.56	157	1.00	0	15,719	15,562
Mount Darwin East	MSC	136	0.60	20,967	92.03	39	0.17	135	0.59	1,177	5.17	328	1.44	1	22,782	22,454
Mount Darwin North	MSC	71	0.37	17,667	92.40	30	0.16	110	0.58	836	4.37	407	2.13	0	19,121	18,714
Mount Darwin South	MSC	46	0.21	19,306	89.05	18	0.08	121	0.56	1,888	8.71	302	1.39	0	21,681	21,379
Mount Darwin West	MSC	121	0.50	22,535	92.85	27	0.11	113	0.47	1,153	4.75	322	1.33	0	24,271	23,949
Mount Pleasant	HRE	36	0.20	10,301	56.38	12	0.07	179	0.98	7,540	41.27	202	1.11	2	18,270	18,068
Mudzi North	MSE	No data														
Mudzi South	MSE	No data														
Mudzi West	MSE	No data														
Mufakose	HRE	29	0.33	1,993	22.68	6	0.07	233	2.65	6,390	72.73	135	1.54	9	8,786	8,651
Murewa North	MSE	No data														
Murewa South	MSE	No data														
Murewa West	MSE	No data														
Musikavanhu	MCL	108	0.87	4,688	37.61	101	0.81	762	6.11	6,333	50.80	474	3.80	0	12,466	11,992
Mutare Central	MCL	15	0.10	4,352	30.19	13	0.09	202	1.40	9,706	67.32	129	0.89	0	14,417	14,288
Mutare North	MCL	183	0.72	17,414	68.91	61	0.24	538	2.13	6,468	25.60	606	2.40	0	25,270	24,664
Mutare South	MCL	184	0.88	12,496	59.51	88	0.42	559	2.66	7,274	34.64	398	1.90	0	20,999	20,601
Mutare West	MCL	233	0.98	16,010	67.11	80	0.34	690	2.89	6,340	26.57	505	2.12	0	23,858	23,353
Mutasa Central	MCL	109	0.61	7,068	39.53	71	0.40	716	4.00	9,531	53.30	387	2.16	0	17,882	17,495
Mutasa North	MCL	158	0.83	9,740	51.08	67	0.35	647	3.39	7,966	41.78	489	2.56	0	19,067	18,578
Mutasa South	MCL	42	0.21	9,045	46.13	18	0.09	224	1.14	10,045	51.23	234	1.19	0	19,608	19,374
Mutoko East	MSE	No data														
Mutoko North	MSE	No data														
Mutoko South	MSE	No data														
Muzarabani North	MSC	66	0.38	16,289	92.70	23	0.13	95	0.54	903	5.14	195	1.11	3	17,571	17,376
Muzarabani South	MSC	137	0.61	20,958	93.87	22	0.10	71	0.32	812	3.64	326	1.46	1	22,326	22,000
Muzvezve	MSW	No data														
Mwenezi East	MVG	No data														
Mwenezi West	MVG	No data														
Nkayi North	MBN	No data														
Nkayi South	MBN	No data														
Nketa	BYO	243	1.73	3,844	27.34	16	0.11	835	5.94	8,993	63.97	127	0.90	0	14,058	13,931
Nkulumane	BYO	284	2.47	2,507	21.82	9	0.08	693	6.03	7,896	68.72	101	0.88	0	11,490	11,389
Norton	MSW	No data														
Nyanga North	MCL	125	0.65	10,757	56.23	54	0.28	607	3.17	7,001	36.59	588	3.07	0	19,132	18,544
Nyanga South	MCL	132	0.68	10,788	55.34	76	0.39	599	3.07	7,438	38.16	460	2.36	0	19,493	19,033
Pelandaba-Mpopoma	BYO	128	1.26	2,310	22.68	11	0.11	574	5.64	7,068	69.40	93	0.91	0	10,184	10,091
Pumula	BYO	153	1.37	2,902	25.91	18	0.16	758	6.77	7,225	64.51	143	1.28	0	11,199	11,056
Redcliff	MID	69	0.41	8,167	48.06	34	0.20	345	2.03	8,107	47.71	270	1.59	0	16,992	16,722
Rushinga	MSC	99	0.38	24,032	93.21	27	0.10	88	0.34	1,175	4.56	362	1.40	1	25,783	25,421
Sanyati	MSW	No data														
Seke	MSE	No data														
Shamva North	MSC	85	0.40	19,038	88.88	40	0.19	161	0.75	1,717	8.02	379	1.77	0	21,420	21,041
Shamva South	MSC	95	0.38	21,816	88.19	17	0.07	129	0.52	2,166	8.76	514	2.08	1	24,737	24,223
Shurugwi North	MID	90	0.48	12,586	67.00	29	0.15	305	1.62	5,295	28.19	481	2.56	0	18,786	18,305
Shurugwi South	MID	99	0.68	9,914	67.92	38	0.26	277	1.90	3,966	27.17	303	2.08	0	14,597	14,294
Silobela	MID	182	1.14	8,033	50.51	80	0.50	720	4.53	6,202	39.00	686	4.31	0	15,903	15,217
Southerton	HRE	15	0.13	3,344	29.42	4	0.04	178	1.57	7,663	67.42	162	1.43	0	11,366	11,204
St Mary's	HRE	19	0.14	5,259	38.33	18	0.13	253	1.84	7,997	58.28	176	1.28	0	13,722	13,546
Sunningdale	HRE	17	0.15	3,044	27.52	8	0.07	186	1.68	7,719	69.78	88	0.80	0	11,062	10,974
Tsholotsho North	MBN	No data														
Tsholotsho South	MBN	No data														
Umguza	MBN	No data														
Umzingwane	MBS	No data														
Uzumba	MSE	No data														
Vungu	MID	125	0.95	6,518	49.29	103	0.78	1,172	8.86	5,102	38.58	204	1.54	0	13,224	13,020
Warren Park	HRE	32	0.19	4,967	28.81	15	0.09	312	1.81	11,793	68.41	119	0.69	1	17,238	17,119
Wedza North	MSE	No data														
Wedza South	MSE	No data														
Zaka Central	MVG	No data														
Zaka East	MVG	No data														
Zaka North	MVG	No data														
Zaka West	MVG	No data														
Zengeza East	HRE	32	0.21	6,129	39.61	14	0.09	252	1.63	8,902	57.53	144	0.93	0	15,473	15,329
Zengeza West	HRE	30	0.19	5,805	37.18	13	0.08	230	1.47	9,390	60.14	146	0.94	0	15,614	15,468
Zhombe	MID	200	1.14	10,218	58.01	79	0.45	606	3.44	6,170	35.03	342	1.94	0	17,615	17,273
Zvimba East	MSW	No data														
Zvimba North	MSW	No data														
Zvimba South	MSW	No data														
Zvimba West	MSW	No data														
Zvishavane Ngezi	MID	43	0.23	8,554	45.20	31	0.16	377	1.99	9,577	50.60	344	1.82	4	18,926	18,582
Zvishavane Runde	MID	113	0.71	11,530	72.25	35	0.22	338	2.12	3,629	22.74	314	1.97	0	15,959	15,645

== National Assembly results ==
House of Assembly election results by constituency ZANU-PF MDC-T Independent

National Assembly results combined first-past-the-post constituency contests with provincial proportional representation (PR) for 60 women's seats. Constituency results were announced locally and aggregated provincially, but ZEC did not publish full provincial vote totals for PR allocation or detailed tabulation from polling stations, severely limiting verifiability. Media outlets provided constituency-level figures, revealing discrepancies in some cases, while PR seat distribution raised methodological concerns, including inconsistencies in applying the Hare quota and largest-remainder method, potentially disadvantaging smaller parties or creating anomalous outcomes (e.g., in Bulawayo).

Opposition parties highlighted unnatural vote surges in rural constituencies and alleged organised voter bussing into urban areas to dilute MDC-T support. The flawed voters' roll amplified these issues, as displaced or ghost voters could theoretically influence constituency outcomes. Recounts ordered in two constituencies were contested or halted, underscoring post-election tensions. Like the presidential contest, the lack of transparent data release meant parallel vote tabulations by observers could not fully reconcile official figures, eroding confidence despite agent presence at lower levels.

=== Summary ===
Party	Votes	%	Seats		
Party	Votes	%	Common	Women	Total
ZANU–PF	2,145,257	62.93	160	37	197
MDC–Tsvangirai	1,031,048	30.24	49	21	70
MDC–Ncube	160,232	4.70	0	2	2
Zimbabwe African People's Union	14,309	0.42	0	0	0
Mavambo/Kusile/Dawn	6,709	0.20	0	0	0
United Movement for Democracy	1,563	0.05	0	0	0
FreeZim Congress	1,405	0.04	0	0	0
ZANU–Ndonga	1,250	0.04	0	0	0
Alliance Khumbula Ekhaya	380	0.01	0	0	0
Progressive and Innovative Movement of Zimbabwe	350	0.01	0	0	0
Freedom Front	200	0.01	0	0	0
Congress for True Democracy	147	0.00	0	0	0
Zimbabwe Development Party	145	0.00	0	0	0
Multi-Racial Christian Democrats	83	0.00	0	0	0
People's Democratic Union	76	0.00	0	0	0
Zimbabwe People's Movement	70	0.00	0	0	0
Voice of the People	38	0.00	0	0	0
Independents	45,745	1.34	1	0	1
Total	3,409,007	100.00	210	60	270
Valid votes	3,409,007	97.99			
Invalid/blank votes	70,022	2.01			
Total votes	3,479,029	100.00			
Source: Zimbabwe Electoral Commission

==== Results by constituency ====
Results by constituency according to the Zimbabwe Electoral Commission
Constituency	Province	2008 result	2013 winning party				Turnout (Note: Excludes spoilt ballots)	Votes								
Constituency	Province	2008 result	Party	Votes	Share	Majority	Turnout	ZANU	MDC–T	MDC	Independent(s)	Other (Note: Includes all other parties' candidates)	Total valid	Total votes rejected	Unaccounted for ballots	Total votes cast
Beitbridge East	MBS	ZANU	ZANU	10,151	65.43%	6,817	50%	10,151	3,334	695	840		15,020	494	0	15,514
Beitbridge West	MBS	ZANU	ZANU	6,194	63.96%	3,953	42%	6,194	2,241	371	142	311	9,259	425	0	9,684
Bikita East	MVG	MDC–T	ZANU	8,669	56.05%	3,304	54%	8,669	5,365	806		140	14,980	486	0	15,466
Bikita South	MVG	MDC–T	ZANU	9,397	66.42%	5,738	47%	9,397	3,659	781			13,837	311	0	14,148
Bikita West	MVG	MDC–T	ZANU	6,270	36.55%	2,407	60%	12,322 (Note: ZANU-PF fielded two candidates, acquiring 6,270 and 6,052 votes respectively.)	3,863	415			16,600	555	2	17,155
Bindura North	MSC	ZANU	ZANU	23,937	78.77%	18,452	81%	23,937	5,485	644			30,066	324	9	30,390
Bindura South	MSC	MDC–T	ZANU	15,441	71.58%	10,446	69%	15,441	4,995	861			21,297	274	1	21,571
Binga North	MBN	MDC–T	MDC–T	12,931	58.86%	7,175	64%	5,756	12,931	1,512		618	20,817	1,153	0	21,970
Binga South	MBN	MDC–T	MDC–T	11,238	57.67%	6,149	64%	5,089	11,238	1,543		842	18,712	775	0	19,487
Bubi	MBN	ZANU	ZANU	10,844	51.52%	4,172	59%	10,844	6,672	1,535	286	716	20,053	997	1	21,050
Budiriro	HRE	MDC–T	MDC–T	13,677	65.37%	7,878	65%	5,799	13,677	1,029		100	20,605	318	1	20,923
Buhera Central	MCL	MDC–T	ZANU	10,946	61.60%	6,030	55%	10,946	4,916	880		302	17,044	726	0	17,770
Buhera North	MCL	ZANU	ZANU	9,669	60.63%	4,116	58%	9,669	5,553	439			15,661	287	0	15,948
Buhera South	MCL	MDC–T	ZANU	12,647	63.90%	6,263	66%	12,647	6,384	369			19,400	391	0	19,791
Buhera West	MCL	MDC–T	ZANU	10,351	56.19%	3,179	60%	10,351	7,172	601			18,124	297	0	18,421
Bulawayo Central	BYO	MDC–T	MDC–T	6,365	56.07%	3,538	41%	2,827	6,365	1,572		442	11,206	146	0	11,352
Bulawayo East	BYO	MDC–T	MDC–T	4,560	36.94%	1,718	51%	2,842	4,560	4,540	158	79	12,179	164	0	12,343
Bulawayo South	BYO	MDC–T	MDC–T	6,364	65.22%	4,472	45%	1,892 (Note: ZANU-PF fielded two candidates, acquiring 1,787 and 105 votes respectively.)	6,364	1,078		250	9,584	174	0	9,758
Bulilima East	MBS	MDC	ZANU	5,828	47.04%	2,035	33%	5,828	3,793	1,004	1,443		12,068	322	0	12,390
Bulilima West	MBS	MDC	ZANU	4,722	43.69%	938	38%	4,722	3,784	1,645		293	10,444	365	0	10,809
Chakari	MSW	ZANU	ZANU	19,538	90.22%	17,897	83%	19,538	1,641				21,179	476	0	21,655
Chegutu East	MSW	ZANU	ZANU	15,687	82.10%	12,974	59%	15,687	2,713	434			18,834	273	0	19,107
Chegutu West	MSW	MDC–T	ZANU	10,061	58.70%	4,088	72%	10,061	5,973	594	200		16,828	311	0	17,139
Chikomba Central	MSE	MDC–T	ZANU	7,723	62.41%	4,490	49%	7,723	3,233	1,185			12,141	234	0	12,375
Chikomba East	MSE	ZANU	ZANU	7,456	69.49%	5,011	49%	7,456	2,445	493		86	10,480	249	0	10,729
Chikomba West	MSE	ZANU	ZANU	17,153	78.02%	13,477	62%	17,153	3,676	733			21,562	423	0	21,985
Chimanimani East	MCL	ZANU	ZANU	12,515	66.05%	7,730	57%	12,515	4,785	1,049			18,349	600	0	18,949
Chimanimani West	MCL	MDC–T	ZANU	9,997	54.73%	2,978	62%	9,997	7,019	589	0	167	17,772	494	1	18,266
Chinhoyi	MSW	MDC–T	MDC–T	9,863	51.47%	1,302	70%	8,561	9,863	543			18,967	196	0	19,163
Chipinge Central	MCL	ZANU	ZANU	12,995	69.37%	8,703	72%	12,995	4,292	930	0		18,217	517	0	18,734
Chipinge East	MCL	MDC–T	ZANU	7,422	51.38%	1,674	41%	7,422	5,748	637	220		14,027	417	0	14,444
Chipinge South	MCL	MDC–T	ZANU	8,302	51.57%	2,538	45%	8,302	5,764	934		452	15,452	646	0	16,098
Chipinge West	MCL	MDC–T	ZANU	6,717	49.15%	961	53%	6,717	5,756	582	188	74	13,317	348	0	13,665
Chiredzi East	MVG	ZANU	ZANU	8,926	75.17%	6,832	43%	8,926	2,094	400			11,420	455	0	11,875
Chiredzi North	MVG	ZANU	ZANU	30,033	91.13%	28,256	76%	30,033	1,777	665			32,475	480	0	32,955
Chiredzi South	MVG	ZANU	ZANU	8,148	74.68%	6,211	40%	8,148	1,937	506			10,591	319	0	10,910
Chiredzi West	MVG	MDC–T	ZANU	12,655	56.81%	4,677	66%	12,655	7,978	855	538		22,026	250	0	22,276
Chirumanzu	MID	ZANU	ZANU	8,744	60.53%	3,820	57%	8,744	4,924	514			14,182	264	0	14,446
Chirumanzu-Zibagwe	MID	ZANU	ZANU	17,996	82.61%	15,193	69%	17,996	2,803	503			21,302	482	0	21,784
Chitungwiza North	HRE	MDC–T	MDC–T	8,071	51.31%	1,564	57%	6,507	8,071	829		158	15,565	166	0	15,731
Chitungwiza South	HRE	MDC–T	ZANU	8,126	46.12%	242	62%	8,126	7,884	927	309	93	17,339	280	0	17,619
Chivi Central	MVG	ZANU	ZANU	12,412	72.58%	8,697	57%	12,412	3,715	662			16,789	312	0	17,101
Chivi North	MVG	ZANU	ZANU	9,564	66.90%	5,414	52%	9,564	4,150	317			14,031	266	0	14,297
Chivi South	MVG	ZANU	ZANU	12,559	75.64%	9,804	52%	12,559	2,755	888			16,202	402	0	16,604
Chiwundura	MID	ZANU	ZANU	11,550	56.47%	3,880	60%	11,550	7,670	480	70	297	20,067	387	0	20,454
Dangamvura-Chikanga	MCL	MDC–T	MDC–T	11,757	44.81%	2,421	84%	9,336	15,608 (Note: MDC-T fielded two candidates, acquiring 11,757 and 3,851 votes respectively.)	468	164	86	25,662	576	0	26,238
Dzivarasekwa	HRE	MDC–T	MDC–T	6,591	48.64%	1,189	58%	5,402	6,591	729	181	408	13,311	239	0	13,550
Emakhandeni-Entumbane	BYO	MDC–T	MDC–T	5,326	57.24%	3,352	37%	1,974	5,326	1,104	554	245	9,203	101	0	9,304
Epworth	HRE	MDC–T	ZANU	15,468	59.92%	7,517	71%	15,468	7,951	1,332	394	103	25,248	566	0	25,814
Glen Norah	HRE	MDC–T	MDC–T	6,672	70.34%	4,688	47%	1,984	6,672	659		41	9,356	129	0	9,485
Glen View North	HRE	MDC–T	MDC–T	7,697	72.17%	5,375	48%	2,322	7,697	469		52	10,540	125	0	10,665
Glen View South	HRE	MDC–T	MDC–T	8,301	69.14%	5,718	46%	2,583	8,301	695	122	158	11,859	147	0	12,006
Gokwe Central	MID	ZANU	ZANU	9,145	63.19%	5,045	60%	9,145	4,100	781	217		14,243	230	0	14,473
Gokwe Chireya	MID	ZANU	ZANU	14,246	80.78%	11,175	47%	14,246	3,071				17,317	319	34	17,636
Gokwe Gumunyu	MID	ZANU	ZANU	11,413	81.99%	9,756	56%	11,413	1,657	436		136	13,642	278	0	13,920
Gokwe Kabuyuni	MID	MDC–T	ZANU	10,350	62.30%	5,160	60%	10,350	5,190	570			16,110	504	0	16,614
Gokwe Kana	MID	ZANU	ZANU	9,693	69.16%	6,161	58%	9,693	3,532	384			13,609	406	0	14,015
Gokwe Mapfungautsi	MID	ZANU	ZANU	13,056	70.96%	9,351	55%	13,056	3,705	1,170			17,931	467	0	18,398
Gokwe Nembudziya	MID	ZANU	ZANU	12,511	76.10%	9,411	57%	12,511	3,100	362		90	16,063	378	0	16,441
Gokwe Sasame	MID	ZANU	ZANU	11,351	64.30%	6,198	49%	11,351	5,153	734			17,238	414	7	17,652
Gokwe Sengwa	MID	ZANU	ZANU	9,991	80.89%	8,225	53%	9,991	1,766	353			12,110	241	0	12,351
Goromonzi North	MSE	ZANU	ZANU	11,802	69.01%	7,668	56%	11,802	4,134	877			16,813	288	0	17,101
Goromonzi South	MSE	MDC–T	ZANU	17,267	57.23%	6,154	81%	17,267	11,113	1,380			29,760	413	0	30,173
Goromonzi West	MSE	ZANU	ZANU	12,758	61.61%	5,635	68%	12,758	7,123	540			20,421	288	0	20,709
Guruve North	MSC	ZANU	ZANU	21,911	87.46%	19,793	72%	21,911	2,118	683			24,712	340	0	25,052
Guruve South	MSC	ZANU	ZANU	18,804	85.47%	16,735	69%	18,804	2,069	695			21,568	432	0	22,000
Gutu Central	MVG	MDC–T	ZANU	9,311	68.51%	6,063	56%	9,311	3,248	886			13,445	146	0	13,591
Gutu East	MVG	MDC–T	ZANU	7,372	64.31%	3,903	48%	7,372	3,469	364			11,205	258	0	11,463
Gutu North	MVG	MDC–T	ZANU	6,845	66.22%	4,400	48%	6,845	2,445	458	390		10,138	199	0	10,337
Gutu South	MVG	MDC–T	ZANU	7,927	64.04%	4,204	49%	7,927	3,723	475			12,125	253	6	12,378
Gutu West	MVG	ZANU	ZANU	13,499	81.40%	11,267	66%	13,499	2,232	565			16,296	288	0	16,584
Gwanda Central	MBS	MDC	ZANU	7,457	51.48%	3,409	58%	7,457	4,048	2,571		237	14,313	172	0	14,485
Gwanda North	MBS	MDC	ZANU	4,246	39.80%	463	47%	4,246	3,783	1,977	169	300	10,475	194	0	10,669
Gwanda South	MBS	ZANU	ZANU	5,701	56.40%	2,835	43%	5,701	2,866	1,020		346	9,933	176	0	10,109
Gweru Urban	MID	MDC–T	MDC–T	7,755	50.85%	1,609	52%	6,146	7,755	578	473	105	15,057	194	0	15,251
Harare Central	HRE	MDC–T	MDC–T	6,828	52.96%	1,853	47%	4,975	6,828	757		162	12,722	170	0	12,892
Harare East	HRE	MDC–T	MDC–T	9,538	50.61%	1,348	56%	8,190	9,538	761		53	18,542	305	6	18,847
Harare North	HRE	MDC–T	ZANU	7,917	49.19%	1,362	56%	7,917	6,555	746	500	67	15,785	310	1	16,096
Harare South	HRE	ZANU	ZANU	20,099	67.30%	12,627	81%	20,099	7,472	1,359		174	29,104	759	0	29,863
Harare West	HRE	MDC–T	MDC–T	9,996	68.70%	6,466	55%	3,530	9,996	771		74	14,371	180	1	14,551
Hatfield	HRE	MDC–T	MDC–T	9,031	63.71%	4,785	50%	4,246	9,031	665		33	13,975	201	0	14,176
Headlands	MCL	ZANU	ZANU	10,975	65.85%	6,475	59%	10,975	4,500	750	0		16,225	442	0	16,667
Highfield East	HRE	MDC–T	MDC–T	8,494	64.12%	4,867	47%	3,627	8,494	747		166	13,034	214	0	13,248
Highfield West	HRE	MDC–T	MDC–T	6,825	64.59%	4,186	45%	2,639	6,825	813	67	31	10,375	192	0	10,567
Hurungwe Central	MSW	ZANU	ZANU	12,078	68.35%	7,810	67%	12,078	4,268	535	333		17,214	456	0	17,670
Hurungwe East	MSW	ZANU	ZANU	12,829	76.30%	12,033	54%	12,829	796	353	2,412		16,390	424	0	16,814
Hurungwe North	MSW	ZANU	ZANU	9,304	73.92%	7,065	49%	9,304	2,239	461		116	12,120	467	1	12,587
Hurungwe West	MSW	MDC–T	ZANU	8,410	66.44%	5,804	45%	8,410	2,606	584	474	221	12,295	363	0	12,658
Hwange Central	MBN	MDC–T	MDC–T	10,345	64.65%	5,903	70%	4,442	10,345	914			15,701	301	0	16,002
Hwange East	MBN	MDC–T	MDC–T	5,392	42.12%	682	53%	4,710	5,392	1,820	125	235	12,282	519	0	12,801
Hwange West	MBN	MDC–T	ZANU	6,864	45.14%	1,423	60%	6,864	5,441	1,401	915	251	14,872	335	0	15,207
Insiza North	MBS	ZANU	ZANU	9,914	66.53%	7,103	57%	9,914	2,811	1,489		275	14,489	412	1	14,901
Insiza South	MBS	MDC	ZANU	4,660	46.52%	2,653	40%	4,660	2,007 (Note: MDC-T fielded two candidates, acquiring 2,007 and 0 votes respectively.)	2,384	455	320	9,826	192	0	10,018
Kadoma Central	MSW	MDC–T	ZANU	9,571	47.31%	566	77%	9,571	9,005	954		220	19,750	482	0	20,232
Kambuzuma	HRE	MDC–T	MDC–T	7,944	60.39%	3,779	59%	4,165	7,944	635	81	154	12,979	175	0	13,154
Kariba	MSW	MDC–T	ZANU	13,433	58.20%	6,146	68%	13,433	8,052 (Note: MDC-T fielded two candidates, acquiring 7,287 and 765 votes respectively.)	582	371		22,438	641	3	23,082
Kuwadzana	HRE	MDC–T	MDC–T	8,564	60.63%	4,219	49%	4,345	8,564	960		100	13,969	157	0	14,126
Kuwadzana East	HRE	MDC–T	MDC–T	7,967	70.88%	5,502	51%	2,465	7,967	625		37	11,094	146	0	11,240
Kwekwe Central	MID	MDC–T	ZANU	6,051	48.42%	291	54%	6,051	5,760	508			12,319	179	0	12,498
Lobengula	BYO	MDC–T	MDC–T	5,580	62.50%	3,732	36%	1,848	5,580	1,113		270	8,811	117	0	8,928
Lupane East	MBN	MDC	ZANU	5,537	41.78%	232	51%	5,537	5,305	1,683	180	208	12,913	340	0	13,253
Lupane West	MBN	ZANU	ZANU	4,827	43.65%	664	51%	4,827	4,163	1,285	223	242	10,740	319	59	11,059
Luveve	BYO	MDC–T	MDC–T	6,985	51.79%	4,111	49%	2,874	6,985	2,348	681	466	13,354	134	0	13,488
Mabvuku-Tafara	HRE	MDC–T	MDC–T	7,917	49.67%	1,598	55%	6,319	7,917	1,141		131	15,508	432	0	15,940
Magunje	MSW	ZANU	ZANU	9,473	68.36%	6,473	52%	9,473	3,000	497	569		13,539	319	0	13,858
Magwegwe	BYO	MDC–T	MDC–T	4,996	56.14%	3,707	37%	1,289	4,996	1,852	392	307	8,836	63	0	8,899
Makokoba	BYO	MDC–T	MDC–T	7,099	55.93%	3,560	48%	3,539	7,099	1,547		323	12,508	184	0	12,692
Makonde	MSW	ZANU	ZANU	15,675	87.52%	14,106	60%	15,675	1,569	429			17,673	237	0	17,910
Makoni Central	MCL	MDC–T	ZANU	7,654	49.15%	4,008	60%	7,654	3,646	555		3,411	15,266	307	0	15,573
Makoni North	MCL	MDC–T	ZANU	9,412	62.91%	4,176	54%	9,412	5,236				14,648	314	0	14,962
Makoni South	MCL	MDC–T	ZANU	10,268	60.25%	5,176	53%	10,268	5,092	631	550	130	16,671	372	1	17,043
Makoni West	MCL	MDC–T	ZANU	8,033	60.98%	3,846	51%	8,033	4,187	639		56	12,915	258	0	13,173
Mangwe	MBS	MDC	ZANU	4,988	40.88%	554	35%	4,988	4,434	1,995		431	11,848	353	2	12,201
Maramba Pfungwe	MSE	ZANU	ZANU	22,264	91.45%	21,193	70%	22,264	1,071	224			23,559	787	0	24,346
Marondera Central	MSE	MDC–T	ZANU	9,308	52.39%	1,416	66%	9,308	7,892	314	112		17,626	128	13	17,767
Marondera East	MSE	ZANU	ZANU	15,626	86.11%	13,513	64%	15,626	2,113	236			17,975	172	0	18,147
Marondera West	MSE	ZANU	ZANU	7,309	56.89%	4,065	53%	7,309	3,244	1,198	355	340	12,446	401	1	12,847
Masvingo Central	MVG	MDC–T	ZANU	9,931	70.53%	6,594	53%	9,931	3,337	431			13,699	381	0	14,080
Masvingo North	MVG	ZANU	ZANU	10,358	70.30%	7,081	63%	10,358	3,277	587	212		14,434	299	0	14,733
Masvingo South	MVG	ZANU	ZANU	9,926	71.56%	7,142	50%	9,926	2,784	478	252		13,440	430	0	13,870
Masvingo Urban	MVG	MDC–T	ZANU	10,988	48.04%	564	64%	10,988	10,424	672		377	22,461	412	0	22,873
Masvingo West	MVG	MDC–T	ZANU	7,634	59.16%	2,947	58%	7,634	4,687	405			12,726	178	0	12,904
Matobo North	MBS	MDC–T	ZANU	5,300	43.84%	81	51%	5,300	5,219	852		417	11,788	301	0	12,089
Matobo South	MBS	MDC–T	ZANU	4,694	43.68%	98	47%	4,694	4,596	764		478	10,532	214	0	10,746
Mazowe Central	MSC	MDC–T	ZANU	10,823	68.26%	6,825	61%	10,823	3,998	656			15,477	378	1	15,855
Mazowe North	MSC	ZANU	ZANU	13,338	85.95%	11,862	64%	13,338	1,476	209	112		15,135	383	0	15,518
Mazowe South	MSC	ZANU	ZANU	11,431	67.96%	7,315	63%	11,431	4,116	820		116	16,483	336	0	16,819
Mazowe West	MSC	ZANU	ZANU	14,383	86.97%	12,972	68%	14,383	1,411	418	76		16,288	249	0	16,537
Mbare	HRE	MDC–T	ZANU	14,764	54.18%	3,832	63%	14,764	10,932	1,041		66	26,803	448	0	27,251
Mberengwa East	MID	ZANU	ZANU	8,895	73.25%	6,283	54%	8,895	2,612	255		89	11,851	293	0	12,144
Mberengwa North	MID	ZANU	ZANU	15,174	83.21%	12,741	63%	15,174	2,433	306			17,913	322	0	18,235
Mberengwa South	MID	ZANU	ZANU	12,358	85.25%	10,796	50%	12,358	1,562	169		148	14,237	260	0	14,497
Mberengwa West	MID	ZANU	ZANU	7,262	71.20%	5,040	45%	7,262	2,222	427			9,911	288	0	10,199
Mbire	MSC	ZANU	ZANU	20,037	84.85%	17,702	69%	20,037	2,335	669			23,041	573	1	23,614
Mbizo	MID	MDC–T	MDC–T	6,917	53.03%	1,711	53%	5,206	6,917	720			12,843	200	0	13,043
Mhangura	MSW	ZANU	ZANU	17,746	88.29%	16,087	64%	17,746	1,659	304			19,709	391	0	20,100
Mhondoro-Mubaira	MSW	ZANU	ZANU	10,153	64.21%	5,680	53%	10,153	4,473	847			15,473	338	0	15,811
Mhondoro-Ngezi	MSW	ZANU	ZANU	13,476	77.39%	9,912	64%	13,476	3,564				17,040	374	0	17,414
Mkoba	MID	MDC–T	MDC–T	10,097	60.52%	4,770	54%	5,327	10,097	720		326	16,470	215	0	16,685
Mount Darwin East	MSC	ZANU	ZANU	21,453	94.15%	20,608	69%	21,453	845	221			22,519	266	0	22,785
Mount Darwin North	MSC	ZANU	ZANU	17,910	93.67%	17,298	61%	17,910	612	189			18,711	410	1	19,121
Mount Darwin South	MSC	ZANU	ZANU	19,680	90.77%	18,279	89%	19,680	1,401	332			21,413	267	1	21,680
Mount Darwin West	MSC	ZANU	ZANU	22,877	94.26%	22,049	77%	22,877	828	260			23,965	306	1	24,271
Mount Pleasant	HRE	MDC–T	ZANU	10,333	56.59%	3,438	41%	10,333	6,895	796			18,024	236	0	18,260
Mudzi North	MSE	ZANU	ZANU	15,485	83.37%	13,667	57%	15,485	1,818	1,052			18,355	218	30	18,573
Mudzi South	MSE	MDC–T	IND.	7,879	47.38%	137	63%	7,742	397	158	7,879		16,176	453	1	16,629
Mudzi West	MSE	ZANU	ZANU	14,266	92.11%	13,533	57%	14,266	733	267			15,266	222	0	15,488
Mufakose	HRE	MDC–T	MDC–T	5,797	66.00%	3,924	44%	1,873	5,797	543	236	207	8,656	127	497	8,783
Murewa North	MSE	ZANU	ZANU	8,733	46.88%	6,592	64%	8,733	2,141	443	6,741	207	18,265	363	0	18,628
Murewa South	MSE	ZANU	ZANU	17,368	86.99%	15,639	67%	17,368	1,729	550			19,647	319	0	19,966
Murewa West	MSE	MDC–T	ZANU	12,779	69.13%	9,114	61%	12,779	3,665	954	657		18,055	430	0	18,485
Musikavanhu	MCL	MDC–T	MDC–T	6,187	49.63%	1,153	46%	5,034	6,187	627		198	12,046	420	0	12,466
Mutare Central	MCL	MDC–T	MDC–T	9,085	63.02%	4,353	56%	4,732	9,085	466			14,283	134	0	14,417
Mutare North	MCL	ZANU	ZANU	17,867	70.70%	11,873	72%	17,867	5,994	860	0		24,721	549	0	25,270
Mutare South	MCL	ZANU	ZANU	13,218	62.92%	8,492	62%	13,218	4,726	802	1,827		20,573	433	0	21,006
Mutare West	MCL	MDC–T	ZANU	16,037	67.22%	8,554	70%	16,037	7,483				23,520	339	0	23,859
Mutasa Central	MCL	MDC–T	MDC–T	8,947	50.04%	923	62%	8,024	8,947	608			17,579	302	0	17,881
Mutasa North	MCL	MDC–T	ZANU	10,151	53.26%	2,197	57%	10,151	7,954	548			18,653	407	0	19,060
Mutasa South	MCL	MDC–T	ZANU	8,963	45.71%	1,031	66%	8,963	7,932	708	1,694		19,297	311	0	19,608
Mutoko East	MSE	ZANU	ZANU	15,064	88.79%	13,725	64%	15,064	1,339	326			16,729	236	0	16,965
Mutoko North	MSE	ZANU	ZANU	16,782	86.30%	14,793	65%	16,782	1,989	297			19,068	379	0	19,447
Mutoko South	MSE	ZANU	ZANU	20,994	89.88%	19,184	76%	20,994	1,810	258			23,062	295	1	23,357
Muzarabani North	MSC	ZANU	ZANU	16,649	94.75%	16,042	63%	16,649	607	162			17,418	154	0	17,572
Muzarabani South	MSC	ZANU	ZANU	21,310	95.46%	20,746	83%	21,310	564	129			22,003	320	0	22,323
Muzvezve	MSW	ZANU	ZANU	18,832	81.93%	15,803	81%	18,832	3,029	569			22,430	555	0	22,985
Mwenezi East	MVG	ZANU	ZANU	18,196	84.54%	15,713	64%	18,196	2,483	494			21,173	350	10	21,523
Mwenezi West	MVG	ZANU	ZANU	22,925	93.18%	21,680	59%	22,925	1,245				24,170	434	1	24,604
Nkayi North	MBN	ZANU	ZANU	5,184	42.89%	82	46%	5,184	5,102	1,039		307	11,632	456	0	12,088
Nkayi South	MBN	MDC	MDC–T	7,210	52.78%	3,106	49%	4,104	7,210	1,416	0	511	13,241	419	0	13,660
Nketa	BYO	MDC–T	MDC–T	7,649	54.41%	3,832	56%	3,817	7,649	1,931		483	13,880	179	0	14,059
Nkulumane	BYO	MDC–T	MDC–T	7,045	61.31%	4,551	44%	2,494	7,045	1,404		415	11,358	132	0	11,490
Norton	MSW	MDC–T	ZANU	10,592	49.75%	1,232	76%	10,592	9,360	894		129	20,975	316	0	21,291
Nyanga North	MCL	MDC–T	ZANU	10,780	56.34%	2,795	57%	10,780	7,985				18,765	368	0	19,133
Nyanga South	MCL	MDC–T	ZANU	11,757	60.31%	5,583	61%	11,757	6,174	782	306		19,019	476	0	19,495
Pelandaba-Mpopoma	BYO	MDC–T	MDC–T	6,024	59.15%	3,902	38%	2,122	6,024	965	411	540	10,062	123	0	10,185
Pumula	BYO	MDC–T	MDC–T	6,100	54.48%	3,223	45%	2,877	6,100	1,514	60	463	11,014	183	0	11,197
Redcliff	MID	ZANU	ZANU	7,631	44.91%	1,808	58%	7,631	5,823	743	2,449		16,646	344	0	16,990
Rushinga	MSC	ZANU	ZANU	24,464	94.89%	23,704	71%	24,464	760	256			25,480	302	0	25,782
Sanyati	MSW	ZANU	ZANU	11,332	75.68%	8,239	63%	11,332	3,093	302			14,727	246	3	14,973
Seke	MSE	ZANU	ZANU	13,285	61.74%	6,874	70%	13,285	6,411	1,175		289	21,160	359	2	21,519
Shamva North	MSC	ZANU	ZANU	19,194	89.61%	17,285	69%	19,194	1,909	0			21,103	317	0	21,420
Shamva South	MSC	ZANU	ZANU	22,332	90.27%	20,818	83%	22,332	1,514	438			24,284	455	0	24,739
Shurugwi North	MID	ZANU	ZANU	12,070	64.43%	6,415	68%	12,070	5,655	563			18,288	445	1	18,733
Shurugwi South	MID	ZANU	ZANU	11,507	78.84%	8,992	63%	11,507	2,515	332			14,354	241	0	14,595
Silobela	MID	MDC–T	ZANU	8,142	51.20%	2,819	55%	8,142	5,323	1,050	279	318	15,112	791	1	15,903
Southerton	HRE	MDC–T	MDC–T	7,068	62.21%	3,823	52%	3,245	7,068	792		61	11,166	196	0	11,362
St Mary's	HRE	MDC–T	MDC–T	7,092	51.68%	1,568	51%	5,524	7,092	685		194	13,495	227	0	13,722
Sunningdale	HRE	MDC–T	MDC–T	5,746	51.94%	2,741	54%	3,005	5,746	557	1,567	86	10,961	102	0	11,063
Tsholotsho North	MBN	IND.	MDC–T	4,874	43.34%	228	40%	4,646	4,874	1,125		283	10,928	317	0	11,245
Tsholotsho South	MBN	MDC	ZANU	4,736	40.86%	760	36%	4,736	3,976	1,549		863	11,124	466	0	11,590
Umguza	MBN	ZANU	ZANU	16,025	66.10%	10,638	64%	16,025	5,387	1,330		736	23,478	767	0	24,245
Umzingwane	MBS	MDC	ZANU	7,685	46.67%	1,516	49%	7,685	6,169	1,833		395	16,082	386	0	16,468
Uzumba	MSE	ZANU	ZANU	21,421	94.83%	20,476	67%	21,421	945	222			22,588			22,588
Vungu	MID	ZANU	ZANU	6,269	47.37%	1,512	50%	6,269	4,757	1,248	417	313	13,004	228	2	13,234
Warren Park	HRE	MDC–T	MDC–T	10,956	63.55%	6,103	57%	4,853	10,956	1,119	84	69	17,081	158	0	17,239
Wedza North	MSE	ZANU	ZANU	14,277	84.89%	12,737	64%	14,277	1,540	510		223	16,550	269	0	16,819
Wedza South	MSE	ZANU	ZANU	8,807	75.07%	6,480	54%	8,807	2,327	352	80		11,566	165	0	11,731
Zaka Central	MVG	MDC–T	ZANU	10,604	66.88%	6,446	59%	10,604	4,158	725			15,487	368	0	15,855
Zaka East	MVG	ZANU	ZANU	8,466	69.83%	5,445	56%	8,466	3,021	441			11,928	195	0	12,123
Zaka North	MVG	MDC–T	ZANU	9,733	65.65%	6,004	51%	9,733	3,729	965			14,427	399	0	14,826
Zaka West	MVG	MDC–T	ZANU	7,340	66.48%	4,446	51%	7,340	2,894	484			10,718	323	0	11,041
Zengeza East	HRE	MDC–T	MDC–T	7,873	50.88%	1,482	54%	6,391	7,873	923		83	15,270	203	0	15,473
Zengeza West	HRE	MDC–T	MDC–T	8,505	54.47%	2,598	11%	5,907	8,505	947		80	15,439	175	0	15,614
Zhombe	MID	MDC–T	ZANU	9,850	55.76%	4,632	56%	9,850	5,218	921	834	427	17,250	414	0	17,664
Zvimba East	MSW	ZANU	ZANU	13,113	72.32%	9,105	66%	13,113	4,008	752			17,873	258	0	18,131
Zvimba North	MSW	ZANU	ZANU	12,633	71.33%	11,664	66%	12,633	969	245	3,577		17,424	287	0	17,711
Zvimba South	MSW	ZANU	ZANU	13,745	80.02%	11,209	65%	13,745	2,536	550			16,831	347	1	17,178
Zvimba West	MSW	ZANU	ZANU	12,728	83.67%	11,061	54%	12,728	1,667	560			14,955	257	0	15,212
Zvishavane Ngezi	MID	ZANU	ZANU	9,015	47.63%	295	64%	9,015	8,720	595	142	97	18,569	358	2	18,929
Zvishavane Runde	MID	ZANU	ZANU	12,851	80.53%	10,484	53%	12,851	2,367	484			15,702	256	0	15,958
Total for all constituencies							Average turnout						Total valid	Total rejected	Total unaccounted for	Total cast
Total for all constituencies							Average turnout	ZANU	MDC-T	MDC	Independent(s)	Other	Total valid	Total rejected	Total unaccounted for	Total cast
Total for all constituencies							Average turnout	Votes								
Total for all constituencies							65.64%	2,145,257	1,031,048	160,232	45,745	26,725	3,409,007	70,022	708	3,479,029
Total for all constituencies							65.64%	62.93%	30.24%	4.70%	1.34%	0.78%	3,409,007	70,022	708	3,479,029
Total for all constituencies							65.64%	Seats								
Total for all constituencies							65.64%	160	49	0	1	0	210			
Total for all constituencies							65.64%	76.19%	23.33%	0%	0.48%	0%	100.0%			

==== Results by province ====
Constituency seat votes and share by province
Province	Number of seats	ZANU-PF			MDC–T			MDC		Independents			Others		Total valid	Vote rejected		Unaccounted for	Total cast
Province	Number of seats	Votes	%	Seats	Votes	%	Seats	Votes	%	Votes	%	Seats	Votes	%	Total valid	Vote rejected		Unaccounted for	Total cast
Bulawayo	12	30,395	23.03%	0	74,093	56.13%	12	20,968	15.89%	2,256	1.71%	0	4,283	3.24%	131,995	1,700	1.27%	0	133,695
Harare	29	176,603	39.94%	6	234,839	53.11%	23	24,052	5.44%	3,541	0.80%	0	3,141	0.71%	442,176	7,083	1.58%	506	449,260
Manicaland	26	263,802	57.70%	22	168,125	36.77%	4	15,454	3.38%	4,949	1.08%	0	4,876	1.07%	457,206	10,731	2.29%	2	467,937
Mashonaland Central	18	335,974	88.19%	18	37,043	9.72%	0	7,642	2.01%	188	0.05%	0	116	0.03%	380,963	6,086	1.57%	15	387,049
Mashonaland East	23	315,669	75.29%	22	72,888	17.38%	0	13,744	3.28%	15,824	3.77%	1	1,145	0.27%	419,270	7,091	1.66%	48	426,374
Mashonaland West	22	278,970	72.52%	21	86,083	22.38%	1	10,989	2.86%	7,936	2.06%	0	686	0.18%	384,664	8,014	2.04%	8	392,681
Masvingo	26	295,740	72.70%	26	94,449	23.22%	0	14,725	3.62%	1,392	0.34%	0	517	0.13%	406,823	8,749	2.11%	19	415,572
Matabeleland North	13	82,764	42.12%	7	88,036	44.80%	6	18,152	9.24%	1,729	0.88%	0	5,812	2.96%	196,493	7,164	3.52%	60	203,657
Matabeleland South	13	81,540	52.24%	13	49,085	31.45%	0	18,600	11.92%	3,049	1.95%	0	3,803	2.44%	156,077	4,006	2.50%	3	160,083
Midlands	28	283,800	65.49%	25	126,407	29.17%	3	15,906	3.67%	4,881	1.13%	0	2,346	0.54%	433,340	9,398	2.12%	47	442,742

=== Quota results ===
Results of the quota seats by province ZANU-PF MDC-T MDC

60 seats - 6 per province - are reserved for women. These are allocated based on proportional representation following the constituency election results.

Vote share and quota seat allocation by province
Province	Party	Votes	%	Women seats /6
Bulawayo	ZANU	30,395	23.03	1
Bulawayo	MDC–T	74,093	56.13	4
Bulawayo	MDC	20,968	15.89	1
Harare	ZANU	176,603	39.94	3
Harare	MDC–T	234,839	53.11	3
Manicaland	ZANU	263,802	57.70	4
Manicaland	MDC–T	168,125	36.77	2
Mashonaland Central	ZANU	335,974	88.19	5
Mashonaland Central	MDC–T	37,043	9.72	1
Mashonaland East	ZANU	315,669	75.29	5
Mashonaland East	MDC–T	72,888	17.38	1
Mashonaland West	ZANU	278,970	72.52	5
Mashonaland West	MDC–T	86,083	22.38%	1
Masvingo	ZANU	295,740	72.70	4
Masvingo	MDC–T	94,449	23.22	2
Matabeleland North	ZANU	82,764	42.12	3
Matabeleland North	MDC–T	88,036	44.80	3
Matabeleland South	ZANU	81,540	52.24	3
Matabeleland South	MDC–T	49,085	31.45	2
Matabeleland South	MDC	18,600	11.92	1
Midlands	ZANU	283,800	65.49	4
Midlands	MDC–T	126,407	29.17	2

== Senate ==
60 seats - 6 per province - are allocated based on proportional representation following the National Assembly constituency election results. 18 seats are allocated for chiefs, 2 from each province, excluding the metropolitan provinces of Harare and Bulwayo, as well as the president and deputy president of the National Council of Chiefs. The remaining two seats are allocated for persons with disabilities, who are voted for by the National Disability Board: one male and one female.

Seat allocation of the Senate ZANU-PF MDC-T MDC Chiefs Persons with disabilities

Results of the Senate seats by province ZANU-PF MDC-T MDC

Vote share and Senate seat allocation by province
Province	Party	Votes	%	Seats /6
Bulawayo	ZANU	30,395	23.03	1
Bulawayo	MDC–T	74,093	56.13	4
Bulawayo	MDC	20,968	15.89	1
Harare	ZANU	176,603	39.94	3
Harare	MDC–T	234,839	53.11	3
Manicaland	ZANU	263,802	57.70	4
Manicaland	MDC–T	168,125	36.77	2
Mashonaland Central	ZANU	335,974	88.19	5
Mashonaland Central	MDC–T	37,043	9.72	1
Mashonaland East	ZANU	315,669	75.29	5
Mashonaland East	MDC–T	72,888	17.38	1
Mashonaland West	ZANU	278,970	72.52	5
Mashonaland West	MDC–T	86,083	22.38%	1
Masvingo	ZANU	295,740	72.70	4
Masvingo	MDC–T	94,449	23.22	2
Matabeleland North	ZANU	82,764	42.12	3
Matabeleland North	MDC–T	88,036	44.80	3
Matabeleland South	ZANU	81,540	52.24	3
Matabeleland South	MDC–T	49,085	31.45	2
Matabeleland South	MDC	18,600	11.92	1
Midlands	ZANU	283,800	65.49	4
Midlands	MDC–T	126,407	29.17	2
