= Paul Chimedza =

Zimbabwean politician (born 1967)

Paul Chimedza is the President of the Zimbabwe Medical Association and a politician. Chimedza was born on 29 June 1967 in Masvingo Province, Zimbabwe.

He was arrested in the Bubi District of Matabeleland North Province following the 2017 Zimbabwean coup d'etat. This came after Chimedza was promoted to a government position by former President Robert Mugabe in a cabinet reshuffle one month earlier.
