= Sarah Mahoka =

Zimbabwean politician (1966–2022)

Personal details
- Born: 23 March 1966
- Died: 17 February 2022 (aged 55); Mashonaland West
- Political party: National Patriotic Front

Sarah Mahoka (23 March 1966 – 17 February 2022) was a Zimbabwean politician and an outspoken former member of the ZANU-PF Party Mahoka was also Zanu PF Mashonaland West Women’s League chairperson And a member of parliament for Hurungwe East.

== Death ==
Mahoka died on 17 February 2022, as the result of a road accident. She was travelling towards Karoi when a haulage truck that was travelling towards Harare allegedly encroached into her lane resulting in a head-on collision.
