= Chakari, Zimbabwe =

Village in Mashonaland West, Zimbabwe

Coordinates: 18°04′S 29°51′E

Chakari is a mining village in the province of Mashonaland West, Zimbabwe. It is located about 33 km west of Chegutu and 38 km north of Kadoma. According to the 1982 Population Census, the village had a population of 8,415. The village grew up around the Turkois Mine in 1907 and was named after the mine. In 1911 it was renamed Shagari but the name was changed again in 1923 to its current name, Chakari. Gold is still mined at the Dalny Mine which is one of Zimbabwe's largest producers of gold. Maize, wheat, sorghum, barley and cotton are grown in the area. This area has red soil that is high is minerals that makes it great for farming crops.
