= Arnold Tsunga =

Zimbabwean lawyer

Arnold Tsunga was the Director of the Africa Regional Programme of the International Commission of Jurists (ICJ) until 2020.

== Career background ==
Before joining the ICJ, he was the Executive Director of Zimbabwe Lawyers for Human Rights (ZLHR) as well as the acting Executive Secretary of the Law Society of Zimbabwe (LSZ) and the National Chairperson of Zimbabwe Human Rights Association (ZimRights). He served as a Humphrey Fellow at the Hubert H. Humphrey Institute of Public Affairs at the University of Minnesota.

The Zimbabwe Lawyers for Human Rights is a human rights organization that provides legal representation to victims of human rights abuses and also defends human rights defenders who are arrested and detained in Zimbabwe. Tsunga has helped document human rights abuses in Zimbabwe and brought them to the attention of the international community. The ZLHR now plays a major role in defending against sustained attacks on the rule of law and human rights in Zimbabwe and in the struggle against impunity in the Southern African region.

He is a trustee of Voice of the People (VOP), a communications trust was established in the year 2000 as an alternative voice for Zimbabweans and advocates for the opening up of the airwaves in Zimbabwe. He faced criminal charges of broadcasting on the radio without a license and went on trial on September 25, 2006, in Zimbabwe. The judge dismissed the case after the government sought a continuance. The case is widely viewed as the many that the regime in Zimbabwe uses to intimidate human rights lawyers from doing their work.

== Recognition ==
In 2006, he was awarded the Martin Ennals Award for Human Rights Defenders and he was honored as a Human Rights Defender in 2006 by Human Rights Watch among many other awards. In 2004, he was a finalist for the US-based Civil Courage Prize, which "honors civil courage — steadfast resistance to evil at great personal risk — rather than military valor". He ultimately won a "Certificate of Distinction in Civil Courage" and a $1,000 cash prize. In 2013, Tsunga was elected as a member of the Zimbabwean Parliament.
