= Munacho Mutezo =

Zimbabwean politician

Munacho Thomas Alvar Mutezo (born 14 February 1954, Chimanimani, Zimbabwe) is a Zimbabwean engineer, businessman and politician.

== Career ==
=== 2005–2008 Minister for Water Resources and Infrastructural Development ===
Munacho Mutezo held this post for 3 years. His appointment to this position was largely due to his technical capacity as an engineer (having qualified from University of Glasgow, Scotland in 1981). He also had private sector experience and this made him a viable candidate for a ministerial position.

He was dropped from this post after the end of that parliamentary term before the 2008 elections.

He was placed on the United States sanctions list from 2005 until 2017.

=== September 2013–December 8, 2014 Deputy Minister of Energy and Power Development ===
Following the 2013 General Elections in Zimbabwe Munacho Mutezo was appointed in the above-mentioned post. His technical and professional expertise were traits needed to run in this Ministry. Speculation says that his more liberal approach that contrasted other hard-core ZANU-PF members prevented him from being appointed full Minister of Energy and Power Development.

=== December 8, 2014 ===
Munacho Mutezo alongside former Zimbabwean Vice President Dr. Joice Mujuru and others were discharged from their roles as Deputy Minister and Vice President respectively on accusations of revolting against then President, Robert Mugabe. Their dismissals also cited that they wanted to overthrow the Party leadership. Mutezo was dismissed together with 8 fellow ZANU-PF members in December 2014.

=== August 2016 ===
Munacho Mutezo was expelled from ZANU-PF party and from the Parliament of Zimbabwe.

=== Current status ===
Munacho Mutezo is a founding member of an opposition Party Zimbabwe People First (ZimPF). The Political Party challenged ZANU-PF in the 2018 general election as part of the MDC Alliance. Mutezo holds the post of ZimPF Party Vice President.
