= Miriam Chikukwa =

Zimbabwean politician

Provincial Governor Minister for Harare Province

Personal details
- Party: ZANU–PF

Miriam Chikukwa is a Zimbabwean politician. She served as a Provincial Governor Minister for Harare Province of Zimbabwe, as well as a member of parliament. She is a member of ZANU–PF.
