= Ray Joseph Kaukonde =

Zimbabwean politician

- Born: Zimbabwe
- Occupation: Politician

Ray Joseph Kaukonde is a Zimbabwean politician. In 2008, he served as a Provincial Governor Minister for Mashonaland East Province of Zimbabwe, as well as a former member of parliament. He is a member of ZANU–PF.
