= David Butau =

Zimbabwean politician

Member of Parliament
- In office 2005–2008
- President: Robert Mugabe
- Constituency: Guruve North

Personal details
- Born: 12 January 1959 (age 67) Southern Rhodesia
- Party: ZANU-PF

David Butau was a member of parliament of Zimbabwe representing the district of Guruve North. He was chairman of the parliamentary Portfolio Committee on Budget and Finance.

Butau was born into a Buja ethnic Shona family in northeastern Zimbabwe. In the early 2000s Butau was openly critical of the Mugabe regime. Butau criticized the way in which the land invasions occurred, stating that he believed some form of land reform was necessary, but the way in which it was implemented was immoral, violent and destructive.

In the 2005 election, while campaigning in Guruve, Butau frequently stated that he believed President Mugabe was wrong to demonize Britain, stating that he believed "Britain is Zimbabwe's natural friend" and that he believed "relations with Margaret Thatcher and John Major were excellent." He said "The British people are Zimbabwe's friends, and they should know that Zimbabweans are their friends as well. Our only quarrel is with Mr. Blair. Just him. Literally him as an individual. We love the English people. We have so many cultural links with them, we should be friends on the world stage." As a result of this speech and others like it, Mugabe loyalists openly stated that they expected Butau to lose popularity in Guruve. However, Butau was re-elected with a large majority in the subsequent election winning 24,165 votes in Guruve North to Allan Marcomic's 2,679 votes.

In late 2007 Butau fled to the United Kingdom to avoid arrest for currency-related charges; he subsequently denied all wrongdoing, stating that he had been motivated by fear of police corruption. Butau told a state newspaper that he was being victimized by members of the government, saying ”We received information that Governor Gideon Gono was amongst those sabotaging the economy and when we confronted him with that he acted fast on me and passed on information to the police about my purported exchange control violations." He later spent several months in South Africa before returning to stand trial in March 2009.

In May 2009 he was acquitted on all counts after the prosecution dropped the charges. The case was universally regarded as an instance of President Mugabe using state power to intimidate his critics.

== See also ==
- Gideon Gono
- Jonathan Moyo
- Robert Mugabe
