= Bekithemba Mpofu =

Zimbabwean real estate developer, academic and politician (born 1973)

Bekithemba Mpofu (born 16 November 1973) is a real estate investment professional, Academic, and Zimbabwean politician. He is currently a Member of Senate for Matabeleland South Province in the Zimbabwean Parliament. Bekithemba is the inaugural secretary general for the Movement for Democratic Change Youth Assembly and has also served as the MDC Alliance's deputy spokesperson. In May 2019, he was nominated for the party national chairmanship during the congress.
