= Mutoko South =

- Constituency for the National Assembly of Zimbabwe
- Province: Mashonaland East
- Region: Mutoko District

Current constituency
- Number of members: 1
- Party: ZANU–PF
- Member(s): Isaac Tasikani

Mutoko South is a constituency represented in the National Assembly of the Parliament of Zimbabwe, located in Mutoko District in Mashonaland East Province. Its current MP since the 2023 election is Isaac Tasikani, ZANU–PF's provincial youth chairman. Previously, the constituency was represented following the 2018 election by Hebert Shumbamhini of ZANU–PF.

== Members ==
Election	Name	Party
2018	Hebert Shumbamhini	ZANU–PF
2023	Isaac Tasikani	ZANU–PF

== See also ==
- List of Zimbabwean parliamentary constituencies
