= Muzvezve =

- Location within Zimbabwe
- Country: Zimbabwe
- Province: Mashonaland West Province

Population (2002)
  - Total: 11,744

Muzvezve is a town in Zimbabwe located in Mashonaland West Province. Its population was 12091 in 2007.
