= Makokoba (constituency) =

National constituency of Zimbabwe (1990–2023)

- Former constituency for the National Assembly of Zimbabwe
- Province: Bulawayo
- Region: Bulawayo

Former constituency
- Created: 1990
- Abolished: 2023
- Seats: 1

Makokoba was a constituency represented in the National Assembly of the Parliament of Zimbabwe, located in the suburb of the same name in Bulawayo. It was most recently represented until 2023 by James Sithole of the Movement for Democratic Change Alliance.

== Members ==
Election	Name	Party
1990	Sydney Malunga	ZANU–PF
1995	Sithembiso Nyoni	ZANU–PF
2000	Thokozani Khuphe	MDC
2005	Thokozani Khuphe	MDC
2008	Thokozani Khuphe	MDC–T
2013	Gorden Moyo	MDC–T
2018	James Sithole	MDC Alliance

== Election results ==
General Election 2008: Makokoba
Party	Candidate	Votes	%	±%
MDC–T	Thokozani Khuphe	4,123	50.5	
MDC-M	Welshman Ncube	2,475	30.3	
ZANU–PF	Tshinga Judge Dube	1407	17.3	
United People's Party	Tonny Sibanda	113	1.4	
Zimbabwe Democratic Party	Tevera Masunga	41	0.5	
Majority		1,648	20.2	
Turnout		8,159		
MDC–T gain from MDC-M		Swing		

== See also ==
- List of Zimbabwean parliamentary constituencies
