= Harare South =

Zimbabwean constituency

- National Assembly constituency for the Parliament of Zimbabwe
- District: Harare
- Province: Harare
- Electorate: 39,759 (2023)

Current constituency
- Number of members: 1
- Party: ZANU-PF
- Member: Trymore Kanupula

Harare South is a constituency represented in the National Assembly of the Parliament of Zimbabwe. The current MP is Trymore Kanupula of the ZANU-PF since the 2023 election.

== Members ==
Election	Name	Party
2023	Trymore Kanupula	ZANU-PF

== See also ==
- List of Zimbabwean parliamentary constituencies
