= Matabeleland North Province =

Matabeleland North Province: Dunhu reMatabeleland North (Shona); Isabelo seMatabeleland North (Northern Ndebele)
- Province
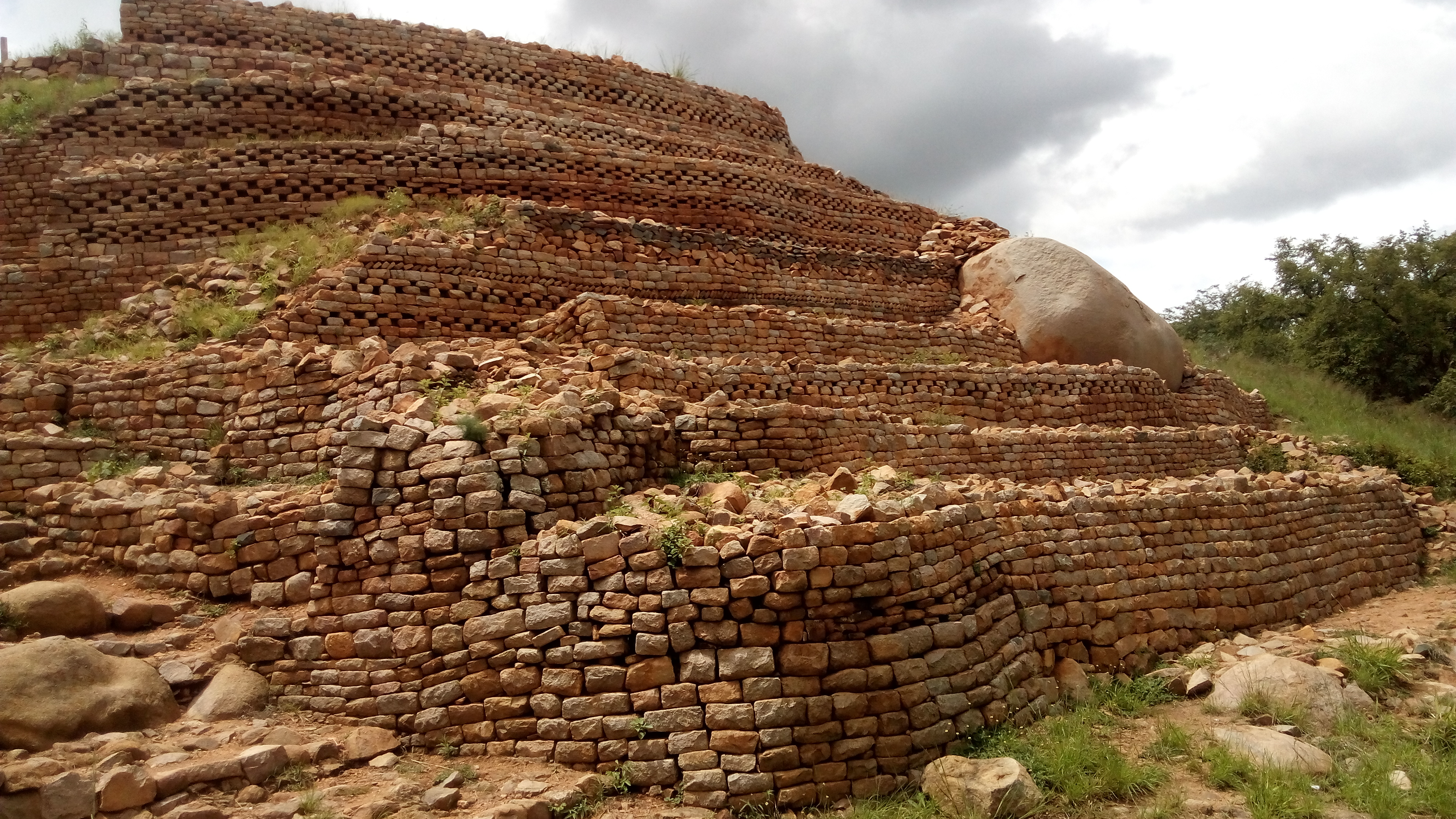
- Khami ruins

- Matabeleland North located within Zimbabwe
- Country: Zimbabwe
- Capital: Lupane
- Established: 1974

Government
  - Type: Provincial Government
  - Minister of State for Provincial Affairs: Richard Moyo (ZANU-PF)

Area
  - Total: 75,025 km^{2} (28,967 sq mi)

Population (2022)
  - Total: 827,645
  - Density: 11.032/km^{2} (28.572/sq mi)
- Time zone: UTC+2 (CET)
  - Summer (DST): UTC+2 (CEST)
- HDI (2021): 0.541 low · 9th of 10

Matabeleland North is a province in western Zimbabwe. With a population of 827,645 as of the 2022 census, it is the country's second-least populous province, after Matabeleland South, and the least densely Zimbabwean populated province. Matabeleland North and Matabeleland South were established in 1974, when the original Matabeleland Province was bifurcated, eventually losing territory in 1997 when the city of Bulawayo became a province in its own right. Matabeleland North is divided into seven districts, has its capital in Lupane, and Victoria Falls and Hwange its largest towns. The name "Matabeleland" is derived from the Matabele or Ndebele people, the province's largest ethnic group.

Matabeleland North is bordered by Matabeleland South and Bulawayo to the south, Midlands to the east, Mashonaland West to the northeast, Botswana to the west, and Zambia to the north, which is separated from Zimbabwe by the Zambezi river. Matabeleland North has an area of 75,025 square kilometres (28,967 mi^{2}), amounting to 19.2% of the total area of Zimbabwe. In terms of area, it is the largest of the country's ten provinces. Matabeleland North is located on the edge of the Kalahari Basin, giving it an arid climate. Its economy is dominated by agriculture, with 83% of employed people in the province working as farmers. Cattle ranching and tourism also contribute to the economy. The Zimbabwean side of Victoria Falls, a World Heritage Site and major tourist attraction, is located in Matabeleland North.

== Demographics ==
| Census | Population |
|---|---|
| 2002 | 704,948 |
| 2012 | 749,017 |
| 2022 | 827,645 |

== Geography ==

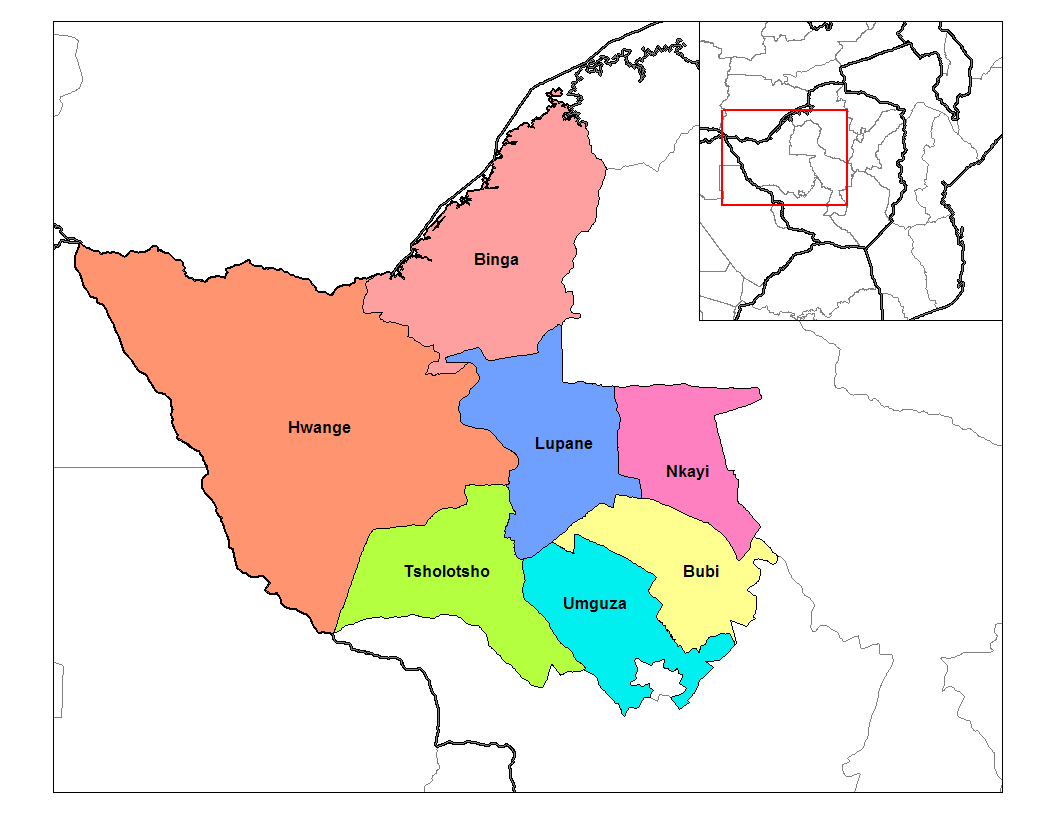
Districts of Matabeleland North

The region of Matabeleland, of which Matabeleland North is a part of, is characterized by generally inhospitable land when compared to other parts of Zimbabwe. It has lower rainfall than provinces such as Mashonaland, and is plagued by water scarcity in general. The land is also less fertile than other provinces, as commercial crops cannot be grown and rural farmers usually cannot produce enough maize to feed their families. However, during the colonial era, large numbers of cattle ranches were formed and cattle ranching has proved to be more successful than growing crops in the province. The upper reaches of the Nata River flow through Matabeleland North before entering Botswana to discharge to the Makgadikgadi Pans.

The region does have a significant amount of other resources like gold, limestone, methane gas, coal, and timber. As seen in Hwange National Park, Zimbabwe's largest game reserve, the area is also known for its substantial wildlife population. However, the most famous geographic feature of Matebeleland North is Victoria Falls, the world's largest waterfalls that are located on the Zambezi river on the northern border of the province.

== Government ==
=== Districts ===
Matabeleland North is divided into 7 districts:

- Binga
- Bubi
- Hwange
- Lupane
- Nkayi
- Tsholotsho
- Umguza

=== Elections ===
The region is regarded as a very independent region when it comes to politics. In the most recent parliamentary election held in March 2008, both factions of the MDC won a total of eight seats from the Matabeleland North delegation to the House of Assembly, while ZANU-PF won four seats and one other seat was won by an independent. In the Senate, the MDC won a combined five seats and ZANU-PF won one seat.

== See also ==
- Provinces of Zimbabwe
- Districts of Zimbabwe
