= Bubi District =

District in Zimbabwe

Coordinates: 19°30′S 28°45′E

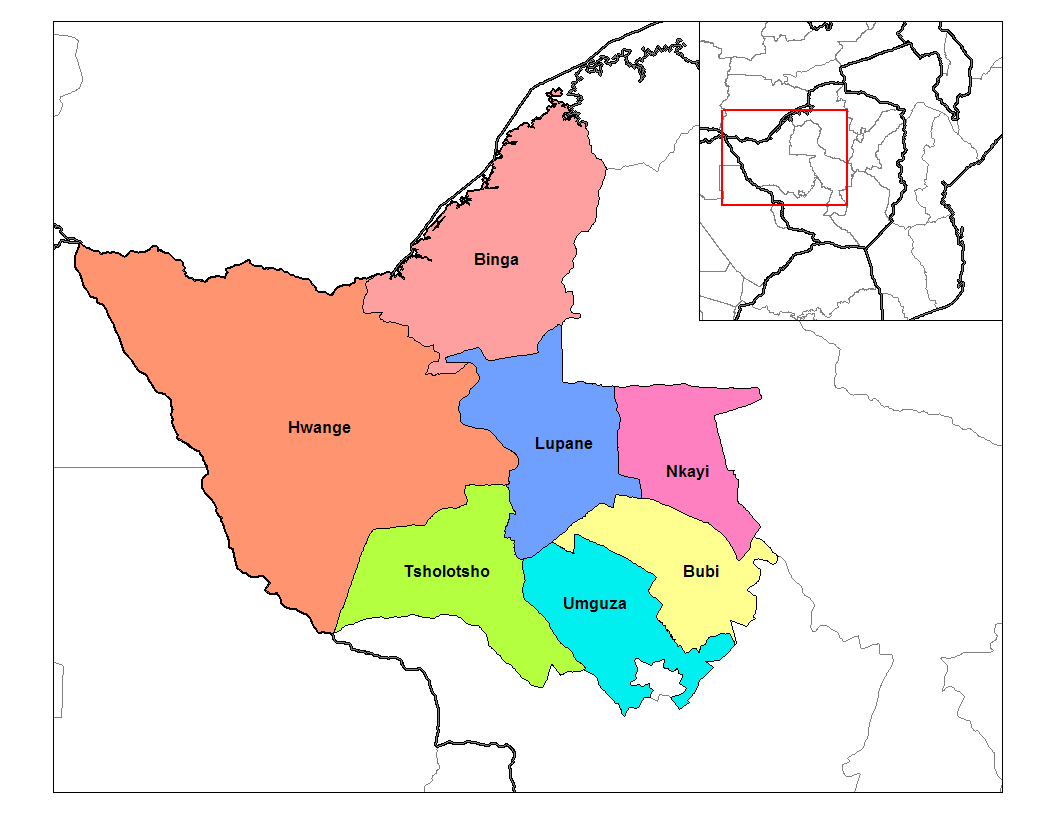
A map of the Matabeleland North districts

Bubi is a district in Matabeleland North in Zimbabwe. It is rich in minerals, but lacks infrastructure. Its 2012 census population was 61,883; and had grown to 74,084 by 2022.
