= Hurungwe East =

Zvimba East
- Constituency for the National Assembly of Zimbabwe
- Province: Mashonaland West
- Region: Karoi District

Current constituency
- Number of members: 1
- Party: ZANU–PF
- Member(s): Chenjerai Kangausaru

Hurungwe East is a constituency of the National Assembly of the Parliament of Zimbabwe, located in Karoi District in Mashonaland West Province. Its current MP since the 2023 election is Chenjerai Kangausaru of ZANU–PF. Previously, the constituency was represented by ZANU–PF's Ngoni Masenda following the 2018 election.

== Members ==
Election	Name	Party
2018	Ngoni Masenda	ZANU–PF
2023	Chenjerai Kangausaru	ZANU–PF

== See also ==
- List of Zimbabwean parliamentary constituencies
