= Constituency results of the 2008 Zimbabwean parliamentary election =

The 2008 Zimbabwean parliamentary election included elections to the House of Assembly and the Senate, contested by three major parties, the ruling ZANU-PF and the two formations of the Movement for Democratic Change (MDC-T and MDC-M), as well as several smaller parties and many independents officially backed by presidential candidate Simba Makoni through the Mavambo movement.

== Candidates for the House of Assembly election ==
=== Murewa North ===
Constituency	Winning Member	Votes	Competing Candidates	Votes
Bulawayo Central	Dorcas Sibanda (MDC-T)	3,786	Japhet Ncube (MDC-M); Clement Ncube (ZANU-PF); Ivan Chigwada (Independent); Arnold Payne (PUMA); Gifton Dumani (FDU); Frank Dzukuso (Independent); Selwin Kwembeya (Independent)	3,553; 908; 191; 162; 74; 63; 56
Bulawayo East	Thabitha Khumalo (MDC-T)	3,587	Yasimin Toffa (MDC-M); Nacisio Makulumo (ZANU-PF); Francis Takaendisa (Independent); Dumiso Matshazi (FDU); Sakiwe Ndhlovu (Independent); Stanley Moyo (UPP)	2,525; 1,031; 471; 147; 114; 80
Bulawayo South	Eddie Cross (MDC-T)	2,764	Jethro Mpofu (MDC-M); Jimmy Nleya (ZANU-PF); Marylin Ndiweni (Independent); Tobias Kamambo (UPP); Wilson Bancinyane (PUMA)	1,605; 483; 112; 58; 0
Emakhandeni–Entumbane	Dingilizwe Tshuma (MDC-T)	3,886	Paul Nyathi (MDC-M); Judith Mkwanda (ZANU-PF); Stephen Nkomo(FDU); Mtheteli Moyo(UPP)	2,306; 965; 135; 57
Lobengula	Samuel Nkomo (MDC-T)	3,850	Dingilwazi Masuku (MDC-M); Christopher Dube (ZANU-PF); Merica Moyo (UPP); Alexius Sibanda(PUMA)	1,923; 1,148; 132; 96
Luveve	Reggie Moyo (MDC-T)	3,325	Esaph Mdlongwa (MDC-M); Getrude Moyo (ZANU-PF); Kidwell Mujuru (Independent); Simba Phiri(FDU)	3,178; 940; 697; 146
Magwegwe	Felix Sibanda (MDC-T)	2,979	Fletcher Ncube (MDC-M); Molly Ndlovu (ZANU-PF); Mpendulo Manga (UPP); Bekezela Ndlovu (Independent)	2,437; 785; 198; 193
Makokoba	Thokozani Khuphe (MDC-T)	4,123	Welshman Ncube (MDC-M); Tshinga Dube (ZANU-PF); Tonny Sibanda (UPP); Tevera Masunga (ZDP)	2,475; 1,407; 113; 41
Nketa-Emganwini	Seiso Moyo (MDC-T)	4,371	Ndlovu Sternlord (MDC-M); Coustin Ngwenya (ZANU-PF); Charles Mpofu (Independent); Sikhumbuzo Dube (ZAPU-FP); Khisimusi Moyo (UPP)	2,129; 1,356; 1,473; 195; 68
Nkulumane	Tamsanqa Mahlangu (MDC-T)	3,976	Gibson Sibanda (MDC-M); Ophar Ncube (ZANU-PF); Dauti Mabusa (Independent); Lilian Moyo (UPP)	2,732; 1,163; 418; 160
Pelandaba-Mpopoma	A candidate died before March 29 - election to be held later	none		
Pumula	Albert Mhlanga (MDC-T)	3,443	Nkanyiso Mhlophe (MDC-M); Godfrey Ncube (ZANU-PF); Paul Sibanda (UPP); Lovemore Sibanda (FDU)	2,751; 1,220; 100; 126

=== Harare ===
Constituency	Winning Member	Competing Candidates
Budiriro	Henry Dzinotyiweyi (MDC-T)	Henry Chibiri (MDC-M); Gladys Hoyoko (ZANU-PF)
Chitungwiza North	Fidelis Mhashu (MDC-T)	Shumba Tamirira (MDC-M); Joyce Kunaka (ZANU-PF); Murapa Martin (Ind)
Chitungwiza South	Misheck Shoko (MDC-T)	Rosemary Mutore (MDC-M); Chris Chigumba (ZANU-PF); Forward Gwindingwi (ZDPP); Clanten Manyepwa (Ind)
Dzivarasekwa	Evelyn Masaiti (MDC-T)	Edwin Mushoriwa (MDC-M); Omega Hungwe (ZANU-PF)
Epworth	Elias Jembere (MDC-T)	Kajawu Garikai (MDC-M, withdrawn); Amos Midzi (ZANU-PF); Victor Chimhawu (UPP); Elias Muzambwa (Ind); Michael Chipamba (Ind)
Glen Norah	Gift Dzirutwe (MDC-T)	Mashumba Kudzanai (MDC-M); Peter Mairesera (ZANU-PF)
Glen View North	Funny Munengani (MDC-T)	Simango Tongai (MDC-M); Mangwende Sabina (ZANU-PF); Martha Mondera (ZANU-PF)
Glen View South	Paul Madzore (MDC-T)	Idah Mashonganyika (ZANU-PF); Clemence Machakaire (UPP); Lovemore Kamupini (Ind)
Harare Central	Murisi Zwizwai (MDC-T)	Maxwell Zimuto (MDC-M); Estella Nyandoro (ZANU-PF)
Harare East	Tendai Biti (MDC-T)	Noah Mangondo (ZANU-PF)
Harare North	Theresa Makone (MDC-T)	Justice Zvandasara (ZANU-PF); Faith Kamutsingiza (UPP); Gladys Mukumbuza (Ind)
Harare South	Hubert Nyanhongo (ZANU-PF)	Joram Nago (MDC-M); Bunjira Romia (MDC-T)
Harare West	Jessie Majome (MDC-T)	Miriam Mushayi (MDC-M); Louis Chidzambwa (ZANU-PF)
Hatfield	Tapiwa Mashakada (MDC-T)	Kennedy Chuma (ZANU-PF); Morgan Changamire (Ind); Morgan Ngirande (ZDP); Whisper Chiwandire (Ind., withdrawn)
Highfield East	Pearson Mungofa (MDC-T)	Elina Moyo (ZANU-PF); Dorcas Manyonda (ZANU-PF); Alexio Mazikana (Ind)
Highfield West	Simon Hove (MDC-T)	Priscilla Misihairambwi (MDC-M); Kizito Kuchekwa (ZANU-PF)
Kambuzuma	Willis Madzimure (MDC-T)	Roselyn Ndavambi (MDC-M); Samuel Chinyowa (ZANU-PF); Charles Mugaviri (Others)
Kuwadzana	Lucia Matibenga (MDC-T)	Abraham Deketek (ZANU-PF); Andrew Dizora(Others)
Kuwadzana East	Nelson Chamisa (MDC-T)	Peter Zimowa (ZANU-PF); Ndaizivei Muvindi (UPP); Dudzai Madzima (Ind)
Mbare	Piniel Denga (MDC-T)	Mupini Spiwe (MDC-M); Tendai Savanhu (ZANU-PF)
Mt. Pleasant	Jameson Timba (MDC-T)	Trudy Stevenson (MDC-M); Alice Midzi (ZANU-PF); Paul Chaora (Ind)
Mufakose	Paurina Mpariwa (MDC-T)	Batsirai Mubaiwa (MDC-M); Victor Kuretu (ZANU-PF)
Southerton	Gift Chimanikire (MDC-T)	Linos Mushonga (MDC-M); Gore Onisimo (ZANU-PF); Tonderai Chikunguru (Ind)
St. Mary’s	Marvellous Khumalo (MDC-T)	Job Sikhala (MDC-M); Chris Pasipamire (ZANU-PF)
Sunningdale	Margaret Matienga (MDC-T)	Gabriel Chaibva (MDC-M); Edward Chataika (ZANU-PF); Thomas Machisa (ZANU-PF)
Tafara-Mabvuku	Shepherd Madamombe (MDC-T)	Mandaza Kudzanayi (MDC-M); Ayoub Kara (ZANU-PF); Timothy Mubhawu (Ind) Gilbert Gwaze (Ind)
Warren Park	Elias Mudzuri (MDC-T)	Elija Manjeya (MDC-M); Samuel Goredema (ZANU-PF); Semwayo Reketayi (Zanu)
Zengeza East	Alexio Musundire (MDC-T)	Goodrich Chimbaira (MDC-M); Ngoni Gwekwete (ZANU-PF); Linos Tivache (UPP); Venis Mugaba (Ind)
Zengeza West	Collen Gwiyo	Arthur Mutambara (MDC-M); Patrick Nyaruwata (ZANU-PF); Simba Maxwell (UPP)

=== Manicaland ===
Constituency	Winning Member	Competing Candidates
Buhera Central	Tangwara Matimba (MDC-T)	Kumbirai Manyika Kangai (ZANU-PF); Daniel Chapinga (Ind)
Buhera North	William Mutomba (ZANU-PF)	Julius Magarangoma (MDC-T)
Buhera South	Naison Nemadziva (MDC-T)	Joseph Chinotimba (ZANU-PF)
Buhera West	Eric Matinenga (MDC-T)	Tapiwa Zengeya (MDC-M); Stanlake Muzhingi (Ind)
Chimanimani East	Samuel Undenge (ZANU-PF)	Maziwanza Nason Tinarwo (MDC-T)
Chimanimani West	Lynette Karenyi (MDC-T)	Thomas Alvar Mutezo Munacho (ZANU-PF); Chikarata Nhamo (Ind, Disqualified — Not Appearing In The Voter’s Roll)
Chipinge Central	Alice Mwaemura Chitima (ZANU-PF)	Samson Sithole (MDC-T)
Chipinge East	Mathias Matewu Mlambo (MDC-T)	Timothy Mapungwana Mhlanga (ZANU-PF)
Chipinge South	Meki Makuyana (MDC-T)	Enock Porusingazi (ZANU-PF); Alfred Tafamba (Ind); Gideon Dhliwayo (Zanu Ndonga); Helani Aaron Hobwana (ZPPDP)
Chipinge West	Sibonile Nyamudeza (MDC-T)	Muromoyawo Daniel Tuso (MDC-M); Gideon Chinosara Goko (ZANU-PF)
Dangamvura-Chikanga	Giles Tariyafero Mutsekwa (MDC-T)	Nomore Muza (MDC-M); Yard Binari (ZANU-PF); Rajab Taziveyi (Ind)
Headlands	Didymus Mutasa (ZANU-PF)	Fambirayi Reginald (MDC-T); Levison Batorava Chifaku (Ind)
Makoni Central	John Nyamande (MDC-T)	Patrick Chinamasa (ZANU-PF); Dunmore Kusano (Ind)
Makoni North	Elton Mangoma (MDC-T)	Bongayi Nemayire (ZANU-PF)
Makoni South	Pishai Muchauraya (MDC-T)	Eliot Patson (MDC-M); Tongesayi Shadreck Chipanga (ZANU-PF); Daniel Gurure (Ind); Edward Makaya (Voice Of The People (VP), Disqualified — Not Appearing In The Voter’s Roll)
Makoni West	Webber Chinyadza (MDC-T)	Joseph Mtakwese (ZANU-PF); Collias Madechiwe (ZURD); Justin George Kawonza (Ind)
Musikavanhu	Chapfiwa Prosper Mutseyami (MDC-T)	Tobias Zephaniah Matanga (ZANU-PF); Gondai Paul Vutuza (Zanu Ndonga)
Mutare Central	Innocent Tinashe Gonese (MDC-T)	Gift Rusanga (MDC-M); Brian Garikai Trinity Munowenyu (ZANU-PF); Dorothy Mbengo (Ind); Moses Mutare (ZPPDP)
Mutare North	Charles Pemhenai (ZANU-PF)	Gabriel Chiwara (MDC-T); Tafara Chikumba (Ind)
Mutare South	Fred Kanzama (ZANU-PF)	Robert Saunyama (MDC-T); Sarah Faith Gombakomba (MDC-M); Gideon Chamuka Chiri (Ind)
Mutare West	Shuah Mudiwa (MDC-T)	Christopher Chindeti Mushohwe (ZANU-PF); Ruth Chikuturudzi (Ind)
Mutasa Central	Trevor Saruwaka (MDC-T)	Pius Makokowe (MDC-M); Oppah Muchinguri (ZANU-PF); Tambudzai Mangwende (Ind)
Mutasa North	David Chimhini (MDC-T)	Munyaradzi Maposa (MDC-M); Nyambuya Michael (ZANU-PF)
Mutasa South	Misheck Kagurabadza (MDC-T)	Shellington Dumbura (ZANU-PF); Bangani Maunga (Ind)
Nyanga North	Douglas Mwonzora (MDC-T)	Nichodimus Chibvura (ZANU-PF)David Mazambani (Ind); Siboniso Nyawupembe (Ind)
Nyanga South	Willard Chimbetete (MDC-T)	Paul Kadzima (ZANU-PF)

=== Mashonaland West ===
Sabina mugabe

=== Masvingo ===
Constituency	Winning Member	Competing Candidates
Bikita East	Edmore Marima (MDC-T)	Walter Matsauri (ZANU-PF); Mathew Makaza (Ind)
Bikita South	Jani Marandeni (MDC-T)	Wilson Makonya (ZANU-PF); Luka Gumbere (Ind)
Bikita West	Heya Shoko (MDC-T)	Elias Musakwa (ZANU-PF)
Chiredzi East	Abraham Sithole (ZANU-PF)	Samson Chingombe (MDC-M); Chiromo Walter (MDC-T); Dennis Mafamu (PAFA)
Chiredzi North	Ronald Ndava (ZANU-PF 39 356)	John Mutambu (MDC-T 170); Olivia Tafamba (PAFA 36)
Chiredzi South	Alois Baolyi (ZANU-PF)	Nehemiah Zanamwe (MDC-M); Joseph Chirove (MDC-T)
Chiredzi West	Moses Mare (MDC-T)	Robson Mashiri (MDC-M); Aliginia Samson (ZANU-PF); Ernest Musareva (PAFA); Godfrey Mungwadzi (Ind)
Chivi Central	Paul Mangwana (ZANU-PF)	Henry Chivhanga (MDC-T); Tinashe Mufudzi (Ind)
Chivi North	Tranos Huruva (ZANU-PF)	Solomon Makokisi (MDC-M); Bernard Chiondengwa (MDC-T); Clifford Mumbengegwi (ZANU-PF, withdrawn); Ropafadzon Tabe (Ind)
Chivi South	Irvine Dzingirai (ZANU-PF)	Steven Chengeta (MDC-T); Sabelo Zivurawa (Ind); Benson Zihuku (UPC)
Gutu Central	Oliver Chirume (MDC-T)	Lovemore Matuke (ZANU-PF)
Gutu East	Ramson Makamure (MDC-T)	Bertha Chikwama (ZANU-PF); Tichaona Revai (Ind)
Gutu North	Edmore Maramwidze (MDC-T)	Frank Machaya (ZANU-PF)
Gutu South	Eliphas Mukonoweshuro (MDC-T)	Benaya Muchovo (MDC-M); Mahofa Shuvai (ZANU-PF); Henrietta Rushwaya (ZANU-PF, withdrawn); Jacob Marandure (Ind)
Gutu West	Noel Mandevu (ZANU-PF)	Stanley Maguma (MDC-T)
Masvingo Central	Jefferson Chitando (MDC-T)	Edmond Mhere (ZANU-PF); Eddison Zvobgo (ZANU-PF, withdrawn); Andrew Magogo (Ind); Munodei Mukwazhe (ZDP); Mike Mutume (UPP)
Masvingo North	Stan Mudenge (ZANU-PF)	Wilstss Mutemere (MDC-T); Alois Chidhodha (UPP); Simbarashe Gobo (Ind)
Masvingo South	Walter Mzembi (ZANU-PF)	Lovemore Matongo (MDC-T); Willington Chinoda (Ind)
Masvingo Urban	Tongai Matutu (MDC-T)	Joburg Mudzume (MDC-M); Omar Joosbie; Tinashe Tavarera (Ind)
Masvingo West	Tachiona Mharadza (MDC-T)	Jabulani Mbetu (ZANU-PF); Kudzai Mbudzi (Ind); Jephias Shava (UPP)
Mwenezi East	Kudakwashe Bhasikiti (ZANU-PF)	Ananias Murambwi (MDC-T); Tavengwa Chidyamakono (Ind)
Mwenezi West	Pilot Masukume (ZANU-PF)	Douglas Tedious (MDC-M)
Zaka Central	Harrison Mudzuri (MDC-T)	Douglas Mahora (MDC-M); Nyaradzo Tachiona (ZANU-PF); Paradzai Chakona (ZANU-PF, withdrawn)
Zaka East	Samson Mukanduri (ZANU-PF)	Jestias Chikwanda (MDC-T); Zivanai Batisayi (PAFA)
Zaka North	Ernest Mudavanhu (MDC-T)	Boniface Chiwore (ZANU-PF)Shepherd Mazorodze (Ind)
Zaka West	Festus Dongo (MDC-T)	Faith Makonese (ZANU-PF); Wellington Muzenda (Ind); Moses Chekero (PAFA)

=== Matabeleland South ===
Constituency	Winning Member	Votes	Competing Candidates	Votes
Beitbridge West	Metrine Mudau (ZANU-PF)	4,239	Petros Mukwena (MDC-M); Enos Chibi Tshili (MDC-T)	1,278; 1,520
Beitbridge East	Kembo Mohadi (ZANU-PF)	4,741	Lovemore Ncube (MDC-M); Siphuma Muranwa (MDC-T)	2,194; 1,101
Gwanda Central	Patric Dube (MDC-M)	4,323	Mtokozisi Bhebhe (MDC-T); Margarine Khumalo (ZANU-PF); Gift Ncube (Puma); Mago Sibanda Matema (independent); Mqabuko Ndlovu (independent)	1,354; 3,340; 94; 657; 85
Gwanda South	A candidate died before March 29 - election to be held later			
Gwanda North	Thandeko Mnkandla (MDC-M)	3,645	Beki Sibanda (MDC-T); Leonard Matutu (ZANU-PF)	2,509; 3,243
Insiza North	Andrew Langa (ZANU-PF)	6,733	Qhubani Moyo (MDC-M); Leslie Dube (MDC-T)	2,361; 1,595
Insiza South	Siyabonga Ncube (MDC-M)	5,252	Robert Tshuma (MDC-T); Patrick Hove (ZANU-PF); Petros Moyo (Puma)	890; 4,006; 171
Matobo North	Lovemore Moyo (MDC-T)	3,503	Albert Ndlovu (MDC-M); Kotsho Dube (ZANU-PF); Marvellous Sibanda (independent)	1,566; 3,102; 432
Matobo South	Clemency Sibanda (MDC-T)	3,226	Gabriel Ndebele (MDC-M); Nicholas Nkomo (ZANU-PF)	1,452; 2,858
Umzingwane	Nomalanga Khumalo (MDC-M)	5,739	Sibusiwe Moyo (MDC-T); Sipambekile Damasane (ZANU-PF)	1,689; 4,357
Bulilima East	Norman Mpofu (MDC-M)	3,180	Themba Ndlovu (MDC-T); Mathias Ndlovu (ZANU-PF)	2,181; 3,104
Bulilima West	Moses Ndlovu (MDC-M)	3,996	Ready Ndlovu (MDC-T); Lungisani Nleya (ZANU-PF)	1,658; 3,359
Mangwe	Mkhosi Edward Tshotsho Moyo (MDC-M)	3,928	Luke Ncube (MDC-T); Mafesi Ncube (ZANU-PF)	2,294; 2,627

== Candidates for the Senate election ==
=== Bulawayo Metropolitan Province ===
Constituency	Candidate	Party	Votes	%
Emangwini	Siphiwe Ncube	MDC-T	8,839	49.0
Emangwini	Rittah Ndlovu	MDC-M	5,229	29.0
Emangwini	Absalom Sikhosana	ZANU-PF	2,209	16.1
Emangwini	Varnish Ndlovu	UPP	169	0.9
Emangwini	Legion Dube	Independent	899	5.0
Gwabalanda	Agnes Sibanda	MDC-T	7,469	47.5
Gwabalanda	Thabiso Ndlovu	MDC-M	5,632	35.8
Gwabalanda	Billie Tshuma	ZANU-PF	1,434	9.1
Gwabalanda	Jethro Mkwananzi	ZAPU FP	734	4.7
Gwabalanda	Bartholomew Ncube	UPP	149	0.0
Gwabalanda	Andrea Moyo	FDU	303	1.9
Khumalo	David Coltart	MDC-M	8,021	47.4
Khumalo	Joubert Mangena	MDC-T	6,077	35.9
Khumalo	Joshua Malinga	ZANU-PF	2,002	11.8
Khumalo	Richard Mabuya	UPP	241	1.4
Khumalo	Norman Sobhuza	Puma	99	0.0
Khumalo	Agrippa Madlela	Independent	498	2.9
Mabuthweni	Gladys Dube	MDC-T	8,657	52.6
Mabuthweni	Greenfield Nyoni	MDC-M	5,426	32.9
Mabuthweni	Tryphina Nhliziyo	ZANU-PF	1,889	11.5
Mabuthweni	Sithembile Khumalo	UPP	277	1.7
Mabuthweni	Ezekia Hlongwane	Puma	221	1.3
Masotsha-Ndlovu	Enna Chitsa	MDC-T	6,225	44.0
Masotsha-Ndlovu	Fanuel Bayayi	MDC-M	5,426	38.4
Masotsha-Ndlovu	Dennis Ndlovu	ZANU-PF	1,785	12.6
Masotsha-Ndlovu	Abednigo Ngwenya	UPP	277	2.0
Masotsha-Ndlovu	Felix Pambano	Independent	421	3.0
Mzilikazi	Matson Mpofu	MDC-T	9,157	58.0
Mzilikazi	Sibangilizwe Msipa	MDC-M	4,217	26.7
Mzilikazi	Canisia Satiya	ZANU-PF	1,785	11.3
Mzilikazi	Austen Moyo	Independent	418	2.6
Mzilikazi	Losper Mpande	Independent	216	1.4

=== Harare Metropolitan Province ===
Constituency	Candidate	Party	Votes	%
Chikomo	Morgan Femai	MDC-T	34,484	62.4
Chikomo	Columbas Sibanda	MDC-M	5,122	9.3
Chikomo	Mandizwidza Bganya	ZANU-PF	11,681	21.1
Chikomo	Paul Musauki	ZPPDP	124	0.2
Chikomo	Margaret Dongo	Independent (Mavambo/Kusile/Dawn)	3,562	6.4
Chikomo	Mathias Guchutu	Independent	308	0.6
Chisipite	Obert Gutu	MDC-T	28,031	72.2
Chisipite	Jacob Zvorwadza	ZANU-PF	8,496	21.9
Chisipite	Rudo Gaidzanwa	Independent (Mavambo/Kusile/Dawn)	2,274	5.9
Chitungwiza	James Makore	MDC-T	37,138	66.2
Chitungwiza	Takapera Zarous	MDC-M	4,413	7.9
Chitungwiza	Mary Chakanyuka	ZANU-PF	14,533	25.9
Chizhanje	Sekai Holland	MDC-T	13,701	67.8
Chizhanje	Charles Chamunorwa	MDC-M	2,487	12.3
Chizhanje	Pamela Tungamirai	ZANU-PF	4,034	19.9
Hwata	Rorana Muchihwa	MDC-T	67,131	79.9
Hwata	Charles Tawengwa	ZANU-PF	13,942	57.9
Hwata	Tineyi Kambewa	Independent (Mavambo/Kusile/Dawn)	2,354	2.8
Mvurachena	Rutendo Chikukwa	ZANU-PF	13,942	57.9
Mvurachena	Cephas Makuyana	MDC-T	7,897	32.8
Mvurachena	Fay Chung	Independent (Mavambo/Kusile/Dawn)	2,238	9.3

=== Manicaland Province ===
Constituency	Candidate	Party	Votes	%
Buhera	Samuel Tsungirirai	MDC-T	34,205	53.1
Buhera	Egenti Makono	ZANU-PF	30,012	46.9
Chimanimani	Monica Mustvangwa	ZANU-PF	30,520	50.2
Chimanimani	Mwaemureyi Mudhluyi	MDC-T	30,221	49.8
Chipinge	Josiah Rimbi	MDC-T	44,581	63.8
Chipinge	Estery Muyambo	ZANU-PF	23,102	33.1
Chipinge	Wilson Kumbula	ZANU-Ndonga	2,196	3.1
Makoni	Stanley Sakupwanya	ZANU-PF	28,477	45.3
Makoni	Ethel Mutangadura	MDC-T	24,494	39.0
Makoni	Matilda Mutigwa	MDC-M	9,836	15.7
Mutare	Keresencia Chabuka	MDC-T	31,490	58.3
Mutare	Esau Mupfumi	ZANU-PF	17,734	32.8
Mutare	Edgar Tekere	Independent (Mavambo/Kusile/Dawn)	2,951	5.5
Mutare	Daniel Sithole	Independent	1,835	3.4
Mutasa-Nyanga	Patrick Chitaka	MDC-T	37,727	64.8
Mutasa-Nyanga	Mandi Chimene	ZANU-PF	18,747	32.2
Mutasa-Nyanga	Chendisaita Mutasa	Independent	2,031	3.5

=== Mashonaland Central Province ===
Constituency	Candidate	Party	Votes	%
Bindura-Shamva	Misheck Chando	ZANU-PF	35,400	64.6
Bindura-Shamva	Martha Muronzi	MDC-T	19,400	35.4
Guruve-Mbire	Gertrude Chibagu	ZANU-PF	32,126	72.4
Guruve-Mbire	Kudzai Mashigaidze	MDC-T	11,052	25.6
Mazowe	Agnes Dete	ZANU-PF	19,294	51.8
Mazowe	Alexander Mawodzwa	MDC-T	14,193	38.1
Mazowe	Rafael Njani	MDC-M	3,754	10.1
Mount Drawin	Alice Chimbudzi	ZANU-PF	34,139	77.9
Mount Drawin	Joshua Chiyangwa	MDC-T	6,581	15.0
Mount Drawin	John Dzvingwe	MDC-M	3,130	7.1
Muzarabani	Jenia Manyeruke	ZANU-PF	16,731	73.8
Muzarabani	Magirito Zulu	MDC-T	5,933	26.2
Rushinga	Damian Mumvuri	ZANU-PF	Unopposed	

=== Mashonaland East Province ===
Constituency	Candidate	Party	Votes	%
Chikomba-Seke	Gladys Mabhiza	ZANU-PF	25,266	53.2
Chikomba-Seke	Kineri Murumbi	MDC-T	13,520	28.5
Chikomba-Seke	Edward Nyazika	MDC-T	8,690	18.3
Marondera-Hwedza	Sydney Sekeremayi	ZANU-PF	24,571	48.2
Marondera-Hwedza	Jane Chifamba	MDC-T	17,370	34.1
Marondera-Hwedza	Penelope Molai	MDC-M	6,994	13.7
Marondera-Hwedza	Wilfred Marimo	Independent	1,996	3.9
Goromonzi	Herbert Murerwa	ZANU-PF	16,156	44.9
Goromonzi	Vincent Gwaradzimba	MDC-T	15,287	42.5
Goromonzi	Cloudios Marimo	MDC-M	4,560	12.7
Murewa	Tendayi Makunde	ZANU-PF	22,429	56.3
Murewa	Shepherd Jana	MDC-T	17,401	43.7
Mutoko	Edmund Jacob	ZANU-PF	26,144	63.0
Mutoko	Patrick Chabvamuperu	MDC-T	15,345	37.0
UMP-Mudzi	Oriah Kabayanjiri	ZANU-PF	54,116	73.0
UMP-Mudzi	Chihono Mutsenhu	MDC-T	18,396	24.8
UMP-Mudzi	Steward Pairemanzi	UPP	1,577	2.1
