= List of political parties in Zimbabwe =

This article lists political parties in Zimbabwe.

== Active parties ==
=== Parties with parliamentary representation ===
Name	Abbr.	Leader	Political position	Ideology	Senate	Assembly
Zimbabwe African National Union – Patriotic Front	ZANU–PF	Emmerson Mnangagwa	Big tent	Pan-Africanism; African nationalism	33 / 80	194 / 280
Citizens Coalition For Change	CCC	Nelson Chamisa	Centre-left	Social democracy	27 / 80	86 / 280

=== Other parties ===
- Zimbabwe African National Congress
- ERA Zimbabwe
- A Road to Freedom Progress and Success (ARFPS)
- African People's Congress
- Democratic Assembly for Restoration and Empowerment
- FreeZim Congress
- Freedom Justice Coalition Zimbabwe Party
- International Socialist Organisation
- Labour, Economist and Afrikan Democrats (LEAD)
- Liberal Democrats
- Matabeleland Peoples Congress
- Movement for People First
- Mthwakazi Republic Party
- National Alliance for Good Governance
- National Patriotic Front
- Patriotic Union of MaNdebeleland
- Riseup Zimbabwe Freedom Party
- United Parties
- United People's Party
- Youth Zimbabwe Freedom Party
- Zimbabwe African National Union – Ndonga
- Zimbabwe African People's Union (ZAPU)
- Zimbabwe African People's Union – Federal Party
- Zimbabwe First Party
- Zimbabwe National Democratic Party
- Zimbabwe National Revival Party - ZNRP
- Zimbabwe Partnership for Prosperity - Kasiyamhuru
- Zimbabwe Youth in Alliance
- Zimbabwe Communist Party

== Defunct parties ==
=== Zimbabwe ===
- Conservative Alliance of Zimbabwe (CAZ)
- Forum Party (FPZ)
- Patriotic Front (PF)
- Republican Front (RF)
- United African National Council (UANC)
- Zimbabwe African National Union (ZANU)
- Zimbabwe People's Democratic Party
- Zimbabwe Unity Movement (ZUM)
- Zimbabwe United People's Organisation (ZUPO)
- United Zimbabwe Alliance (UZA)

=== Rhodesia ===
- Central Africa Party
- Centre Party (CP)
- Confederate Party
- Dominion Party
- Federal Party
- Mthwakazi United Party (MUP)
- Responsible Government Association (RGA)
- Rhodesian Action Party (RAP) (1977–1979)
- Rhodesian Front (RF) (1962–1981), ruling party from 1962 until 1979
- Rhodesia Labour Party (RLP)
- Rhodesian White People's Party (RWPP) (1976), banned
- Southern Rhodesia African National Congress (SRANC)
- Southern Rhodesia Communist Party (SRCP)
- Southern Rhodesia Liberal Party (SRLP)
- United Federal Party (UFP)
- United National Federal Party (UNFP)
- United People's Party (Rhodesia) (UPP)
- United Rhodesia Party
