= Emakhandeni–Entumbane =

- Former constituency for the National Assembly of Zimbabwe
- Province: Bulawayo
- Region: Bulawayo

Former constituency
- Created: 2008
- Abolished: 2023
- Seats: 1

Emakhandeni–Entumbane was a constituency represented in the National Assembly of the Parliament of Zimbabwe between 2008 and 2023. Located in Bulawayo, it was most recently represented by Dingilizwe Tshuma of the Movement for Democratic Change Alliance.

== History ==
Emakhandeni–Entumbane MP Cornelius Dube of the Movement for Democratic Change – Tsvangirai died on 15 August 2009, leaving a vacancy.

== Members ==
Election	Name	Party
2008	Cornelius Dube	MDC–T
2013	Dingilizwe Tshuma	MDC–T
2018	Dingilizwe Tshuma	MDC Alliance

== Election results ==
Parliamentary Election 2008: Emakhandeni-Entumbane
Party	Candidate	Votes	%
MDC–T	Cornelius Dube	3,886	51.94
MDC-M	Paul Nyathi	2,308	30.85
ZANU–PF	Judith Mkwanda	965	12.90
Federal Democratic Union	Stephen Nkomo	135	1.80
PUMA	Wilson Bancinyane	130	1.74
United_People's_Party_(Zimbabwe)	Mtheteli Moyo	57	0.76
Majority		1,578	21.09%
MDC–T win (new seat)			

== See also ==
- List of Zimbabwean parliamentary constituencies
