= Lobengula (constituency) =

- Former constituency for the National Assembly of Zimbabwe
- Province: Bulawayo
- Region: Bulawayo

Former constituency
- Created: 2008
- Abolished: 2023
- Seats: 1

Lobengula was a constituency represented in the National Assembly of the Parliament of Zimbabwe between 2008 and 2023. It was most recently represented by Gift Banda of the Movement for Democratic Change Alliance.

== Members ==
Election	Name	Party
2008	Samuel Sipepa Nkomo	MDC–T
2013	Samuel Sipepa Nkomo	MDC–T
2018	Gift Banda	MDC Alliance

== Election results ==
Parliamentary Election 2008: Lobengula
Party	Candidate	Votes	%
MDC–T	Samuel Sipepa Nkomo	3,850	53.85%
MDC-M	Dingilwazi Masuku	1,923	26.90%
ZANU–PF	Christopher Dube	1,148	16.06%
UPP	Merika Moyo	132	1.85%
PUMA	Alexias Sibanda	96	1.34%
Majority		1,927	26.95%
MDC–T win (new seat)			

== See also ==
- List of Zimbabwean parliamentary constituencies
