= Masvingo Urban =

Constituency of the Parliament of Zimbabwe

- Constituency for the National Assembly of Zimbabwe
- Province: Masvingo
- Region: Masvingo

Current constituency
- Created: 2008
- Seats: 1
- Party: Citizens Coalition for Change
- Member(s): Martin Mureri
- Created from: Masvingo Central

Masvingo Urban is a constituency represented in the National Assembly of the Parliament of Zimbabwe, comprising the city of Masvingo and surrounding residential areas. It was created ahead of the 2008 election with territory taken from the Masvingo Central constituency. Its current MP since the 2023 election is Martin Mureri of the Citizens Coalition for Change. Previously, the constituency was represented by Jacob Nyokanhete of the Movement for Democratic Change Alliance following the 2018 election.

== Profile ==
In 2008, Masvingo Urban had 31,489 registered voters. The constituency had a poverty rate of 76 percent, with animal husbandry, formal employment, cross-border trading with South Africa, and tourism at Great Zimbabwe being the leading sources of income. Masvingo Urban was ethnically diverse, with residents coming from the Karanga, Zezuru, and Manyika sub-groups of the Shona people, as well as Ndebele people.

== Members ==
Election	Name	Party
2008	Tongai Matutu	MDC–T
2013	Daniel Shumba	ZANU–PF
2018	Jacob Nyokanhete	MDC Alliance
2023	Martin Mureri	CCC

== See also ==
- List of Zimbabwean parliamentary constituencies
