= Gwaranyemba =

- Village
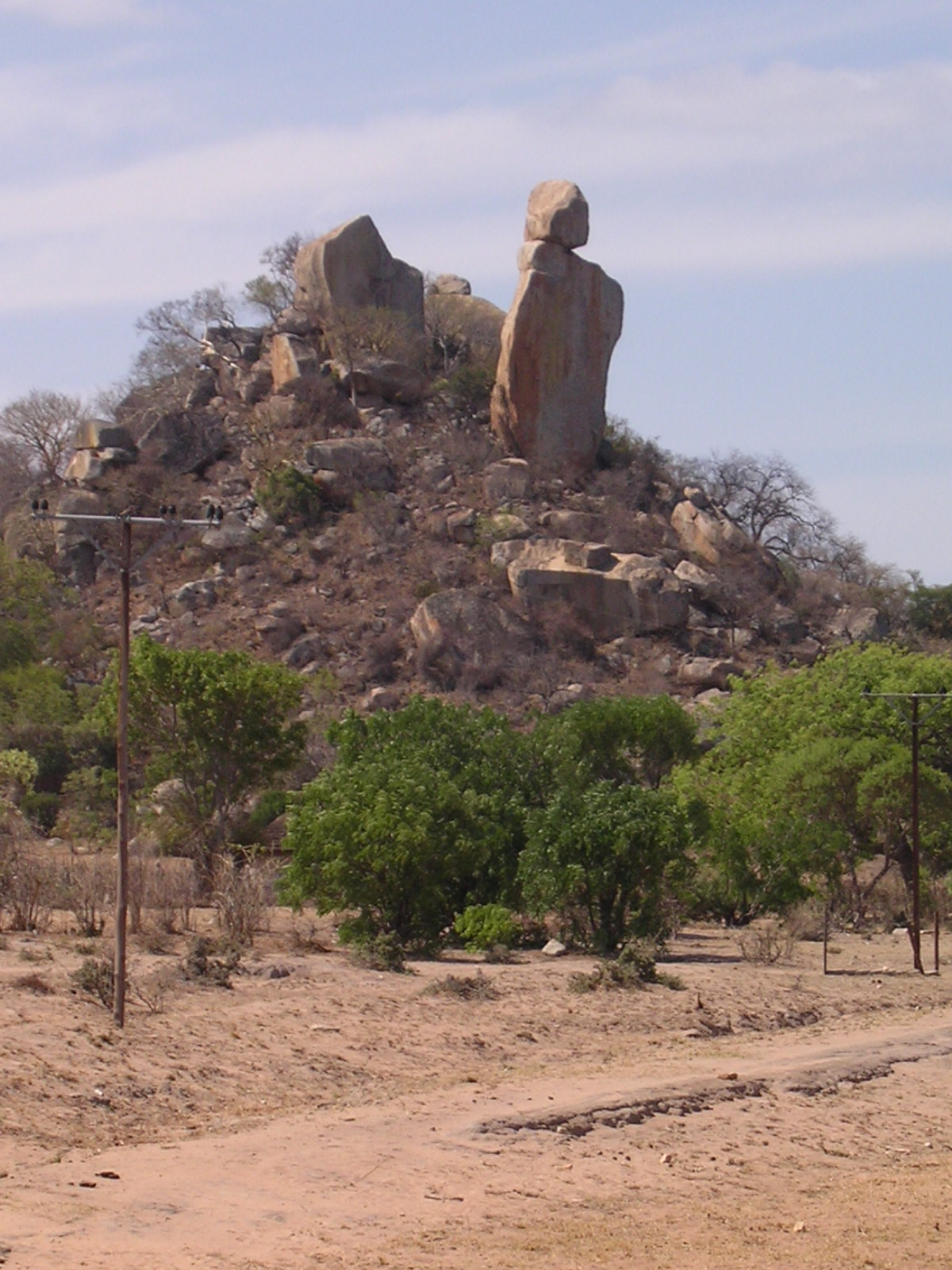
- Castle kopje at Gwaranyemba

- Location in Zimbabwe
- Coordinates: 21.167637°S 28.986730°E
- Country: Zimbabwe
- Province: Matabeleland South
- District: Gwanda District
- Time zone: UTC+2 (Central Africa Time)

Gwaranyemba is a village in Gwanda District of Matabeleland South province in southern Zimbabwe. There are shops, two schools, and a dam.

Gwaranyemba was the home of ZAPU activist and politician, Dauti Mabusa.
