= Nyandoro =

Nyandoro is a surname. Notable people with the surname include:

- Esrom Nyandoro (born 1980), Zimbabwean footballer
- George Nyandoro (1926–1994), Zimbabwean politician and activist
- Gibson Nyandoro (1954 or 1955–2008), Zimbabwean war veteran and political dissident
- Henry Nyandoro (1969–1998), Kenyan footballer
- Rudolf Nyandoro (born 1968), Zimbabwean Roman Catholic prelate
