= Lobengula (disambiguation) =

Lobengula may refer to:

- Lobengula, king of the Northern Ndebele people
- Lobengula, a constituency in Zimbabwe
- Lobengula, a pet lion in South Africa
