= Liberal Democrats (Zimbabwe) =

Political party in Zimbabwe

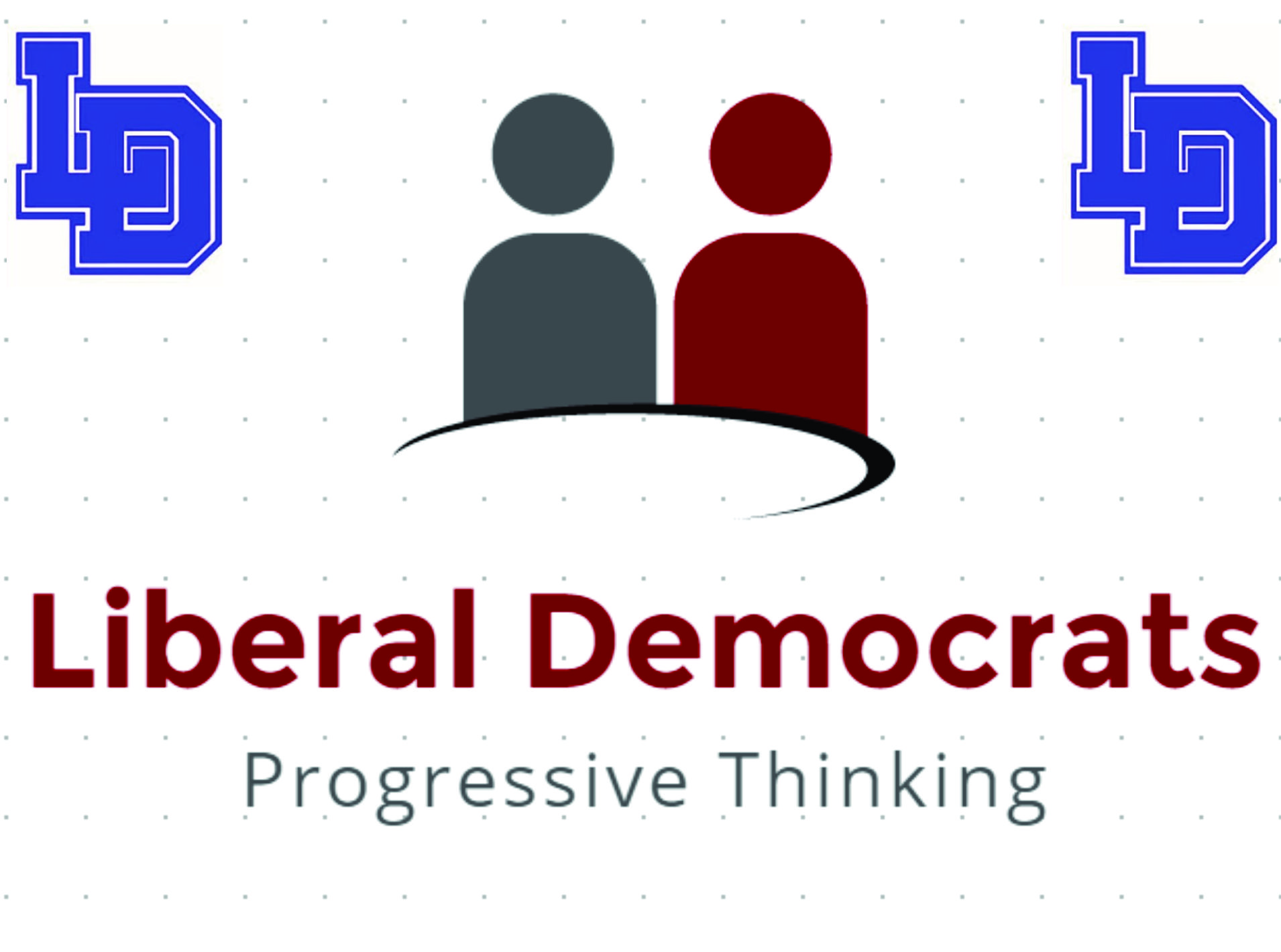
- Chairperson: Dr Vusumuzi Sibanda
- General Secretary: Mr Thulani Khabo
- Spokesperson: Mr Elmorein Muzewe
- Founded: 21/07/2015
- Headquarters: Johannesburg, South Africa
- Ideology: Social liberalism
- Political position: Centre-left
- Colors: Blue, Red and Grey

Party flag
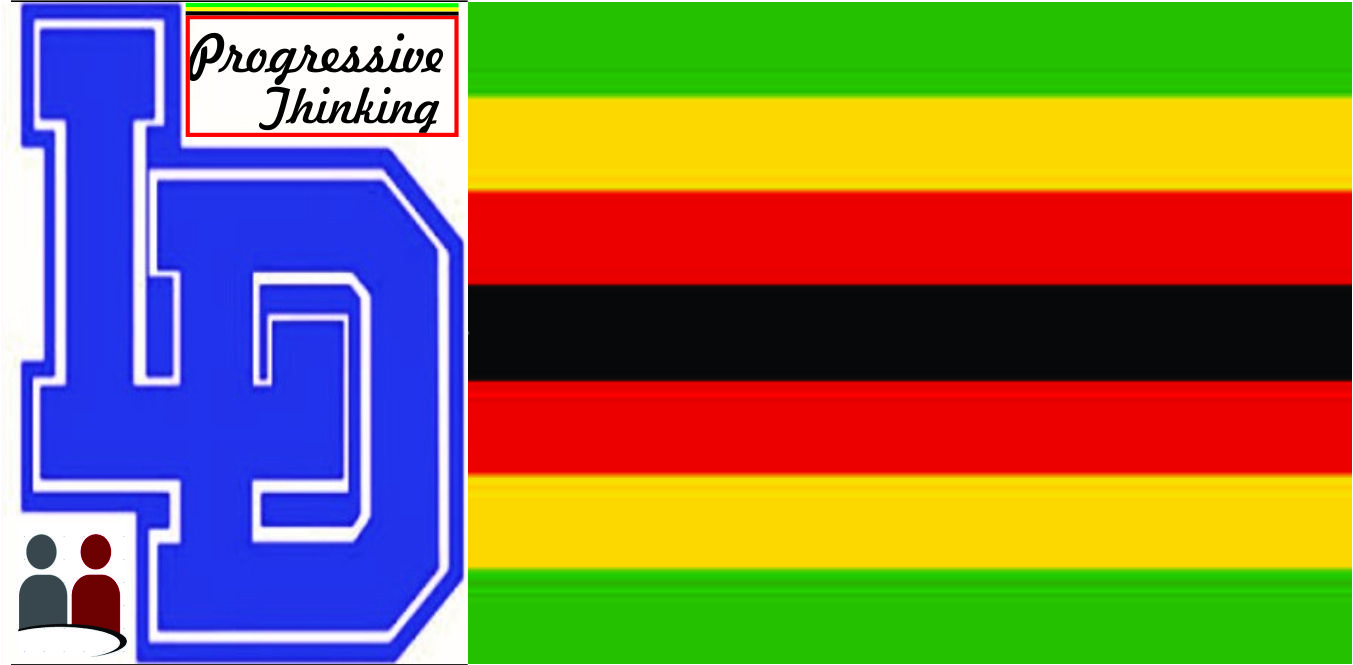

Website
- www.liberaldemocratszim.org

The Liberal Democrats of Zimbabwe was formed in 2015 from South Africa. It is a political party registered in terms of ZEC requirements in Zimbabwe. The party did not participate in the 2018 general election. In 2016 it petitioned the Zimbabwean Embassy in Pretoria over the spending of US$800,000 on Robert Mugabe's birthday when many Zimbabweans were starving.

The Liberal Democrats have raised various issues about Zimbabwe including their claim that Mr Mugabe, the President of Zimbabwe and the ruling party ZANU PF in Zimbabwe was being abused and his rights as an elderly person being violated by those close to him who were using him for their personal gains. The Liberal Democrats of Zimbabwe appear to be following hard on the issue of individual rights as enshrined or shown in the website and evidenced by this claim on Mr Mugabe who is seen by many as the one violating their rights; yet they ironically contend his rights are being violated instead.

In 2017 the Liberal Democrats of Zimbabwe raised a number of issues including the political state of affairs in Zimbabwe through its chairperson. The open letter appeared to be lamenting the inability to act by the Zimbabwean people and the lack of coherence in political activities. It made mention of the failures of many political parties including the major opposition parties like the MDCT which has always been seen as the contender to political office.

The Liberal Democrats weighed in on the Zimbabwean appointment of the Chief Justice again coming in with views about how Mr Mugabe had been forced to appoint the Chief Justice who was not likely to have been his first choice due to the ZANU PF factional wars. Mr Mugabe at the end of March 2017 appointed Justice Luke Malaba as the Chief Justice replacing Justice Godfrey Chidyausiku who had been at the helm of the country of Zimbabwe's legal system for 17 years and was retiring as he had reached his retirement age, the age of 70 as per the Constitution of Zimbabwe.

Justice Luke Malaba, who at his appointment was 66, would only serve for 4 years and yet many Zimbabweans had pinned their hopes on the man to change the judiciary having managed some award-winning judgments such as on child marriages. He had outdone two other favoured contenders for ZANU PF in the form of Justice Rita Makarau who is the country's ZEC Chairperson and Judge Paddington Garwe.

The Liberal Democrats partnered with other political parties in South Africa in April 2016 while the country was due to commemorate its 36th independence demanding the diaspora vote. The Liberal Democrats is part of a network of political parties and Civic Society Organisations in South Africa that formed the Zimbabwe Diaspora Vote Coalition to lobby for the Zimbabweans in the diaspora to be allowed to vote in Zimbabwe a country that only allows only government employees to vote from outside Zimbabwe.

In 2017, during Zimbabwe's independence day celebration the Liberal Democrats wrote an article in which it spoke about what they think independence means in light of the political situation in Zimbabwe. In this document they sought to explain the difference between independence and freedom. Prior to this document the Liberal Democrats published another opinion piece on which it called on ZImbabweans to wake up to their civic duties and responsibilities. In that document it widely spoke about the fallen heroes of Zimbabwean politics from pre-independence to current individuals that are fighting the government of Mr Mugabe. The article highlighted what it viewed as failures by political parties such as MDC-T, which was tipped to win Zimbabwean elections after it won the elections in 2008 but was cheated out of government by ZANU-PF.

In March 2018, the Liberal Democrats approached the Zimbabwean Constitutional Court claiming that the actions on the army in November 2017 were unconstitutional. They further claimed in their court papers that the change in power or government was as a result of that coup and therefore prayed the Zimbabwean Apex Court to declare such actions unconstitutional, the resultant government unconstitutional and therefore not worthy to oversee the forthcoming elections in 2018 because it was tainted with illegality and unconstitutionalism. The matter was heard in absence of the applicants after it was mysteriously withdrawn and the Concourt clerk confirmed the matter had been removed to the applicants, but only for the matter to proceed and be heard in Chambers before Chief Justice Malaba who went to on to give a judgment considering that other similar challenges had not gotten judgment, that showed that the papers had put a dent that had to justify a judgment to try and justify the coup.

In 2018, the Liberal Democrats did not participate in the national elections citing that the playing ground was skewed and the elections were a mere facade to endorse the ZANU candidates. This was seen in August 2018 as soldiers killed six people in Harare before election results were announced.

The country further plunged into worse chaos and food riots in January 2019 and the MDC Alliance list its Constitutional Court bid to have election results overturned. The MDC Alliance also in 2019 and 2020 found itself faced with more adverse court decisions and arbitrary ones. All this points to a judiciary that is not independent and works to please the appointing authority but not serving as a balancing act in the trias politica.

== See also ==
- History of Zimbabwe
- Movement for Democratic Change – Tsvangirai
