= Fay Chung =

Zimbabwean educator

Dr. Fay King Chung
- Chung in 2007

Minister of National Affairs, Employment Generation and Cooperatives
- In office 1993–1995
- President: Robert Mugabe
- Preceded by: New post
- Constituency: Non-constituency Member of Parliament

Minister of Education, Sport and Culture
- In office 1988–1993
- President: Robert Mugabe
- Preceded by: Dzingai Mutumbuka
- Constituency: Non-constituency Member of Parliament

Deputy Secretary for Administration in the Ministry of Education, Sport and Culture
- In office 1980–1988
- President: Robert Mugabe (1987–2017)
- Prime Minister: Robert Mugabe (1980–1987)

Personal details
- Born: March 1941 (age 85) Southern Rhodesia
- Party: Mavambo/Kusile/Dawn
- Other political affiliations: ZANU–PF
- Children: Chipo Chung
- Occupation: Educator

Fay King Chung (born March 1941) is a Zimbabwean educator and was an independent candidate for the 2008 Zimbabwean senatorial election. Chung has worked to extend access to education and to bring education-with-production principles into school curricula in Zimbabwe and other developing countries.

== Early life and education ==
Chung was born in the British self-governing colony of Southern Rhodesia, the third generation of a Chinese immigrant family. Her grandfather, Yee Wo Lee, the fifth son of a large peasant Chinese family, emigrated to Rhodesia in 1904 at the age of seventeen and became a successful cafe owner. Her father was a successful businessman called Chu Yao Chung. Her mother, Nguk Sim Lee, was a Chinese-trained nurse who emigrated to Rhodesia to get married. She died whilst giving birth when Fay Chung was only three years old. After her mother's death, Fay Chung and her two sisters were raised by her grandfather and grandmother, assisted by a Shona nanny named Elina.

Chung grew up in a Roman Catholic Chinese family in Rhodesia (now Zimbabwe) in the 1950s and trained as an educator at the University of Rhodesia (the present-day University of Zimbabwe) and in 1968 went on to earn her postgraduate degree in education and a masters in philosophy in English literature at the University of Leeds. Most recently, Chung earned a BA in economics from the University of London's School of Oriental and African Studies. Chung attended the Indian and Asian primary school called Louis Mountbatten, named after the British Viceroy of India. The headmaster was a South African Indian from Durban called V. S. Naidoo, who was instrumental in persuading Fay Chung's father, a conservative and traditionalist, to allow her to go as a boarder to Founders High School, which had recently opened as the first secondary school for Asians and "Coloureds".

== Career ==
Chung was Deputy Secretary for Administration in the Ministry of Education from 1980 to 1988 and Minister of Education in President Robert Mugabe's cabinet from 1988 to 1993. In 1980, 5% of the black population in Zimbabwe had access to free basic education as provided by government schools (at that time mission schools provided the majority of basic education); by 1993, Zimbabwe had achieved a 95% primary education rate.

=== Early career ===
During the 1960s, Chung taught underprivileged students in one of the largest Rhodesian townships in Gwelo and in the early 1970s became a lecturer in the Department of Education at the University of Zambia. In Zambia, she became a vocal supporter of the African nationalist movement. With the escalation of the guerrilla war inside Rhodesia, in 1973 Chung joined the Zimbabwe African National Union (ZANU). Her participation with a banned political organisation drove her into exile in Tanzania, and later Mozambique in the mid- and late 1970s where she learned to speak Shona fluently. Her initial role within ZANU was in the Information and Media Department; she subsequently became the senior official responsible for implementing the movement's teacher training and curriculum development in refugee camps.

=== Post-independence ===
Fay Chung with Victoria Chitepo at the first graduation of the Women's University in Africa in 2006

Chung co-founded the Zimbabwe Foundation for Education with Production, a non-governmental organisation that combined education with agricultural production theory to assist war veterans and their families and was subsequently appointed Deputy Minister of Administration of the Ministry of Education at Zimbabwe's independence in 1980. Chung was appointed Minister of Education by Mugabe in 1988. During her tenure at the Ministry of Education, Chung developed and implemented a nationwide primary and secondary education program. She resigned from the Ministry of Education after disagreeing with the government.

After resigning from the Ministry of Education, Chung worked to replicate the Zimbabwean education platform in developing countries around the world as Chief of the Education Cluster at UNICEF in New York. In 1998, she returned to Africa, where she was the founder and first director of UNESCO's International Institute for Capacity Building in Africa based in Ethiopia.

=== Return to Zimbabwe ===
Chung returned home to Zimbabwe in 2003 ostensibly to retire, though she has continued to be outspoken on Zimbabwean politics. In 2006, she authored Re-Living the Second Chimurenga: Memories of the Liberation Struggle for Zimbabwe, her memoir. In addition, she has continued to be active in various organisations, including supporting various women's education, leadership and empowerment efforts in Africa. She is a founder of the Forum for African Women Educationalists, the Association for Strengthening Higher Education for Women in Africa and is also the chairperson of the board of trustees of the Women's University in Africa which she helped co-found in 2003.

=== 2008 Zimbabwean election ===
Chung was one of the early public supporters of independent presidential candidate, Simba Makoni, who announced his presidential candidacy in early February 2008. In the Zimbabwean parliamentary election of 2008, Chung returned to the political arena and stood as an independent candidate within Makoni's Mavambo formation for the Mvurachena senatorial constituency. She gained 2,238 votes, losing to Cephas Makuyana of the Movement for Democratic Change – Tsvangirai.
