= Morgan Femai =

Zimbabwean politician (born 1949)

Morgan Femai (born 9 September 1949) is a Zimbabwean senator for Chikomo and Chairperson for Harare in the office of Prime Minister Morgan Tsvangirai. He was elected in the 2008 Zimbabwean parliamentary election with 34,484 votes.

In May 2012, at a parliamentary HIV awareness workshop in Kadoma, he made several statements about AIDS prevention, such as that women should be compelled to shave their heads, lose weight and bathe less often, in order to appear less attractive. He also suggested female circumcision. He also told the workshop, "Women have got more moisture in their organs as compared to men so there is need to research on how to deal with that moisture because it is conducive for bacteria breeding. There should be a way to suck out that moisture."

Gender Activist Betty Makoni said that he should withdraw his statement.

Senator Femai died in October 2025
