= Dauti Mabusa =

Zimbabwean politician

Dauti Salatiel Mabusa (21 March, 1940 – 4 February, 2022) was a Zimbabwean activist and politician, who was born in Gwaranyemba in Gwanda District.

Mabusa was a member of the Southern Rhodesian African National Congress, and later of ZAPU. He was involved in the ZAPU sabotage campaign of the mid-1960s; was subsequently caught and held in solitary confinement at the Khami Prison, and later at Grey and Wha Wha prisons (Zimbabwe).

Mabusa was released after the Lancaster House Agreement and campaigned for ZAPU in the election preceding independence. He continued to be involved with ZAPU activities, for which he was detained without trial, in 1981.

He unsuccessfully contested the constituency of Nkulumane, in the 2008 parliamentary election, as an independent candidate, losing to Tamsanqa Mahlangu of MDC-T.

A biography based on him, was published in 2020.
