= Edward Raradza =

Zimbabwean politician and farmer (1946/1947–2026)

Edward Raradza (1946 or 1947 – 4 September 2026) was a Zimbabwean politician and tobacco farmer. He was the vice-chairperson of the Zimbabwe Farmers Union.

Raradza was elected in the 2008 parliamentary election, as a member of the Zanu-PF for the Muzarabani South constituency; He ran unopposed. Raradza died on 4 September 2026, at the age of 79.
