= Women's University in Africa =

University in Marondera, Zimbabwe

- Motto: Addressing Gender Disparity and Fostering Equality in University Education
- Type: Private University
- Established: 2002
- Chancellor: Prof. Jane Naana Opoku-Agyemang
- Vice-Chancellor: Prof. Sunungurai Dominica Chingarande
- Location: Marondera, Mashonaland East, Zimbabwe
- Campus: Rural
- Website: www.wua.ac.zw

Women's University in Africa (WUA) is a private university which is supported through student fees and donors from around the globe, established in 2002 and located in Marondera, Zimbabwe. It has a student enrollment policy of 80% women and 20% men. The Women's University in Africa aims to address gender disparity and foster equity until there is equity in accessing tertiary education; and to work on knowledge and skills in areas of vital importance for women.

== Administration ==
Founded by Prof. Hope Sadza and Dr. Fay Chung, the university is currently headed by the chancellor, Prof. Jane Naana Opoku-Agyemang, who was inaugurated in 2018, succeeding Dr. Inonge Mbikusita Lewanika. Other top executive management staff include the vice chancellor, Prof. Sunungurai Dominica Chingarande, the PVC academics, Prof. Chipo Hungwe, the bursar, Mr. Rodgers Murehwa, and the university librarian, Ms. Plaxedes Chaitezvi.

== Academic ==
The Women's University in Africa is a multidisciplinary institution, offering both undergraduate and postgraduate programmes, under three distinct faculties.

=== Faculty of Agricultural and Environmental Sciences ===
The faculty offers bachelor degrees in the following programs

• Meat Science and Diary Technology

• Agricultural Education and Extension

• Environmental Science

• Animal Science

• Horticulture

• Agribusiness Management

Masters degree program are also available in:

• Livestock Science and Meat Technology

• Agribusiness System Management and Development

=== Faculty of Management and Entrepreneurial Sciences ===
• Information Technology

• Computer Science

• Business Intelligence and Data Analytics

• Banking and Finance

• Supply Chain Management

• Human Capital Management

• Informations Systems

• Marketing

• Accounting

• Business Administration

• Strategic Marketing

• Human Resource Management

=== Faculty of Social and Gender Transformative Sciences ===
• Psychology

• Social Work

• Women and Gender Studies

• Public Management and Governance

• Sociology

• Community Development

• Early Childhood Development In Service

• Early Childhood Development Pre-Service

• Primary (In-Service)

• Disaster Risk and Livelihood Studies

• Strategic Communication

• Public Administration
