= Langton Towungana =

Zimbabwean politician

Langton Towungana was an independent presidential candidate in the Zimbabwean presidential election held on March 29, 2008. His opponents were Morgan Tsvangirai of the Movement for Democratic Change, Simba Makoni, another independent candidate, and incumbent President Robert Mugabe of ZANU-PF.

Towungana emerged from obscurity on electoral court nomination day and filed his papers declaring his intention to contest in the presidential election. He is a resident of the small tourist resort town of Victoria Falls, where he is a teacher and runs several businesses. His campaign was based on the need for God to solve Zimbabwe's problems, and for a government of national unity.

He obtained 0.6% of the vote, finishing fourth and last.
