= Chitungwiza North =

Parliamentary constituency in Harare Province, Zimbabwe

- National Assembly constituency for the Parliament of Zimbabwe
- District: Chitungwiza
- Province: Harare
- Electorate: 35,942 (2023)

Current constituency
- Created: 2008
- Number of members: 1
- Party: Citizens Coalition for Change
- Member: Godfrey Sithole
- Created from: Chitungwiza

Chitungwiza North is a constituency represented in the National Assembly of the Parliament of Zimbabwe, located in Harare Province. It covers part of Chitungwiza, a dormitory city of Harare. Its current MP since the 2013 election is Godfrey Sithole of the Citizens Coalition for Change (previously of the Movement for Democratic Change Alliance).

== History ==
In 2008, Fidelis Mhashu (MDC) was elected the MP for the constituency, defeating the ZANU-PF's Joyce Kunaka, MDC-Mutambara member Tamirira Shumba, and UPP member Martin Murapa.

== Members ==
Election	Name	Party
2008	Fidelis Mhashu	MDC–T
2013	Godfrey Sithole	MDC–T
2018	Godfrey Sithole	MDC Alliance
2023	Godfrey Sithole	CCC

== See also ==
- List of Zimbabwean parliamentary constituencies
