= Zimbabwe African People's Union – Federal Party =

Political party in Zimbabwe

The Zimbabwe African People's Union – Federal Party is a minor Zimbabwean political party, based in Matabeleland. ZAPU-FP split from Agrippa Madlela's ZAPU party, purportedly a revival of those members of ZAPU who had rejected the 1987 merger with ZANU-PF in January 2002, following attempts by a faction of ZAPU led by Agrippa Madlela not to contest the Zimbabwean presidential election, 2002 a ZAPU founder Paul Siwela, was seconded to run as ZAPU's presidential candidate but was blocked by Aggripa Madlela's faction which itself was accused of accepting payments from the MDC which feared that ZAPU's participation in the election would split the anti-Mugabe vote in Matabeleland.

ZAPU-FP has a federalist, Matabeleland-centric ideology similar to that of PUMA. Paul Siwela left the leadership of the party in January 2008 in order to initiate a broader Matabeleland alliance, the Federal Democratic Union, with a view to forming a militant front that sought to consolidate the Matabeleland vote into an electoral block that could be used to renegotiate the region's political trajectory. The ZAPU FP Secretary General, Sikhumbuzo Dube, claimed to have fired Paul Siwela from the party for which he assumed the role of President. Both Sikhumnuzo Dube and Paul Siwela stood unsuccessfully for election as candidates of ZAPU FP and the Federal Democratic Union, respectively.

The party contested the Zimbabwean parliamentary election, 2005 for the Zimbabwean Senate, gaining 213 votes (0.03%) contested the Zimbabwean House of Assembly in the Zimbabwean parliamentary election, 2008 in Nketa, gaining 195 votes and the Senate election in Gwabalanda (Bulawayo), gaining 734 votes. ZAPU-FP has participated in the National Constitutional Assembly's effort at drawing up a new home-grown constitution for Zimbabwe with its current president Sikhumbuzo Dube having been the chairperson of NCA's Political Parties Liaison committee and serving as national Taskforce member. ZAPU-FP also participated in the outreaches for collection of data and in the crafting of the current Zimbabwe constitution which came into force in 2013. ZAPU-FP advocates for the federation of Zimbabwe into five provinces/states of Mashonaland, Manyikaland, Masvingo, Matabeleland and Midlands to which executive, judicial and legislative authority is devolved and constitutionally guaranteed to ensure equitable distribution of political power as well as economic resources.

Zapu has been a major party even during the liberation struggle, at par with Zanu pf in terms of political influence and military strength. After the Unity Accord in 1987, the party was merged into one with Zanu pf- with the collaboration between Joshua Nkomo and Robert Mugabe.

As a result of the serious degradation of political and social values, serious corruption and abuse of fundamental human rights, Zapu was re-ignited to make contest the abuse of power which reversed all the gains of the liberation struggle. Some of the most vocal members across provinces included the then president Dumiso Dabengwa, Strike Mkandla, James Mohlo, Madla Dube. Thomas Mavhuna as well as young members of the youth wing notably Mischeck Maseka, Griven Mhlanga, Martin Chichebo, Spiwe Mzini, Ntombizodwa Qaba

Along with three other minor opposition parties, ZAPU-FP is a member of the Zimbabwe Organisation of Opposition Political Parties.
