= Julia Dolly Joiner =

Gambian politician

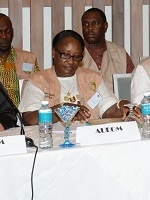
- Born: 11 November 1956 (age 69)
- Citizenship: Gambian
- Occupation: Politician

Julia Dolly Joiner (born November 11, 1956 Banjul, Gambia) is a Gambian politician. She is Commissioner of Political Affairs for the African Union, based in Addis Ababa, Ethiopia. From September 1994 until June 1995, Joiner served as Deputy Permanent Secretary for Gambia's Ministry of Youth, Sport, and Culture for the Gambia, then acted as Permanent Secretary for the Ministry of External Affairs for the following year (June 1995 to November 1996).

In December 1998, she was appointed Permanent Secretary to the Office of the President, then Head of the Gambian Civil Service in 1999. From January 1999 to December 1999, she also acted as Secretary to the Cabinet. In 2003, she was appointed Commissioner of Political Affairs for the African Union. In 2015, she was an election observer for the African Union in the Seychelles presidential election.
