= Gibson Nyandoro =

Zimbabwean dissident

Gibson Nyandoro, in 2008

Gibson Nyandoro (1954 or 1955–2008) was a Zimbabwean war veteran and political dissident who died in military custody in Zimbabwe in May 2008.

Originally a supporter of Robert Mugabe's Zanu-PF, and a participant in the war for independence, he took part in the seizing of White-owned farms.

A few days before the March 2008 elections, he took part in a pro-Opposition rally. He was arrested on May 2 in Epworth, near Harare, and reportedly tortured to death in army barracks.
