= Fidelis Mhashu =

Zimbabwean politician (died 2018)

The Right Honourable Fidelis Mhashu MP

Minister of National Housing and Social Amenities
- In office 13 February 2009 – 11 September 2013
- President: Robert Mugabe
- Prime Minister: Morgan Tsvangirai
- Preceded by: Emmerson Mnangagwa
- Succeeded by: Office abolished

Personal details
- Died: 20 August 2018 (aged 76)
- Party: Movement for Democratic Change-Tsvangirai

Fidelis Mhashu (died 20 August 2018) was a Zimbabwean politician who served as Minister of National Housing and Social Amenities from 2009 to 2013. He served as the Member of Parliament (MP) for Chitungwiza North (MDC-T) until his death.
