= Gift Banda =

Zimbabwean politician

- Born: Gift Banda; April 26, 1969 (age 56); Bulawayo, Rhodesia
- Occupation: Deputy Mayor of Bulawayo

Gift Banda (born 26 April 1969) is a Zimbabwean politician who served as the Deputy Mayor of Bulawayo and holds a number of influential positions in Zimbabwean football, including serving as President of Njube Sundowns F.C., Chairman of the ZIFA Southern Region and sits on the board of the Zimbabwe Football Association.
