= Castle Kopje =

Archaeological ruins in Zimbabwe

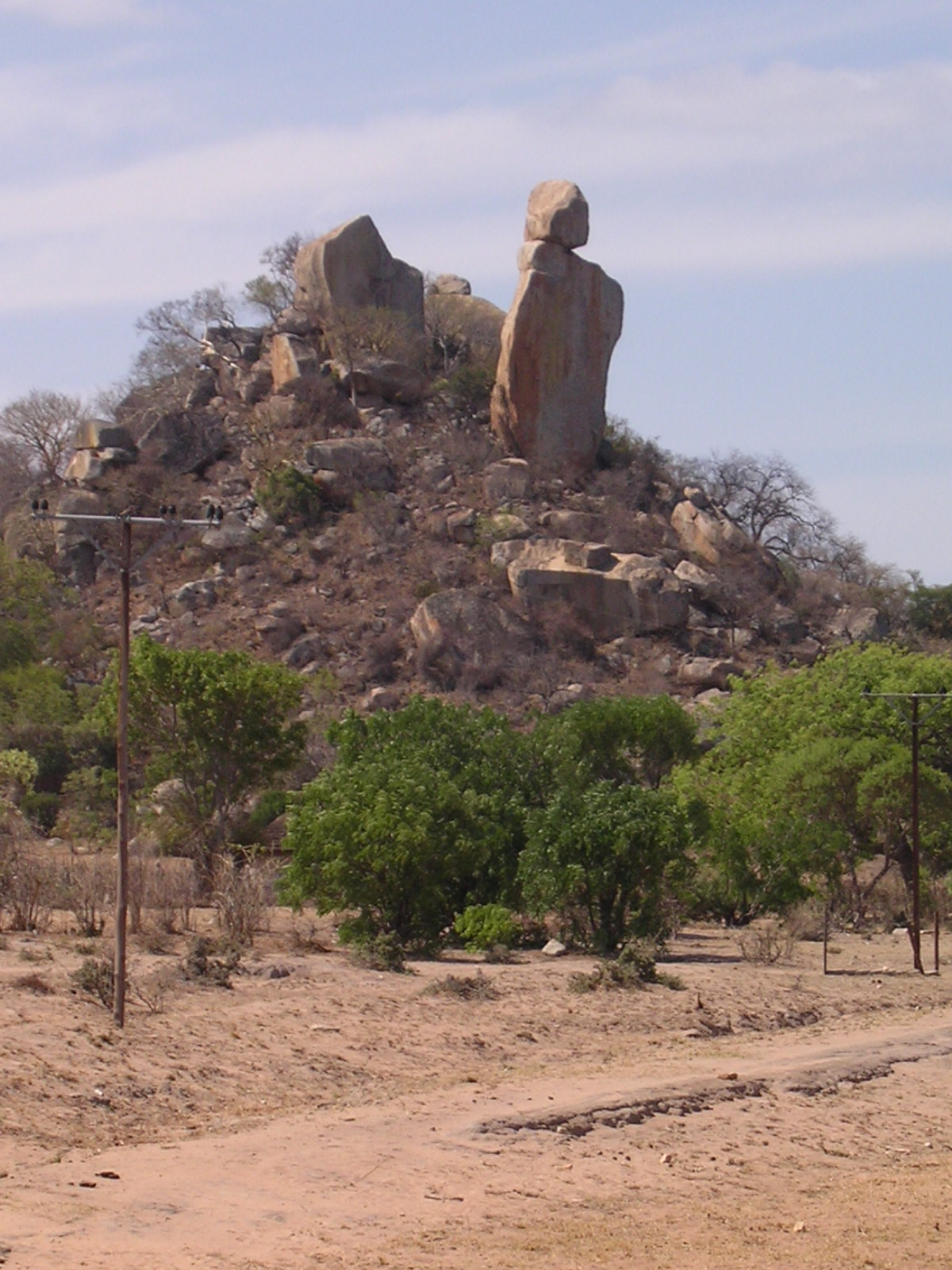
- Castle Kopje

- Location in Zimbabwe
- Coordinates: 18.35609°S 31.77718°E
- Country: Zimbabwe
- Province: Matabeleland South
- District: Gwanda District
- Time zone: UTC+2 (Central Africa Time)

Castle Kopje is an Iron Age site located in east-central Zimbabwe, dating back to the second millennium. It is believed to have been a smaller settlement during the period when the Kingdom of Zimbabwe was at its height.
