= Daniel Shumba =

Zimbabwean politician

Daniel Kuzozvirava Shumba is a former Zimbabwe Army colonel and businessman; he returned to active politics and rose to Masvingo Provincial Chairman and member of the Central Committee [(the highest organ)] of the ZANU-PF political party. He is a son of a founding member of ZANU, and had a strong political background. He underwent Zanla's basic military training at Chisamba, Zambia, in 1978 before continuing with his academics. Shumba's accolades extend to having served in the Special Forces (The Parachute Group) of the Zimbabwe National Army from 1983 to 1989.

In 2006, he was fired from the party in a falling-out over the unresolved issue of the Tsholotsho agenda. Later in that year, he announced the creation of his own party, the United People's Party. He did not run in the 2008 Zimbabwean presidential election, but went on to win an order in the Supreme Court of Zimbabwe.

In September 2009, Shumba resigned from opposition politics and rejoined Zanu-PF. He won in Masvingo Urban constituency, in the July 2013 National Elections.Shumba was a member of Zanu-PF"s highest organ, the Central Committee, and was appointed (in December 2014) Deputy Secretary for Transport and Welfare, in the Zanu-PF's Politburo.

Shumba left Zanu PF in December 2017 following the coup, leading to the formation of the United Democratic Alliance (UDA). Shumba is the founding President of the UDA. He contested the controversial 30 July 2018 Presidential elections. He was a Respondent in the Constitutional Court Application challenging the results of Presidential election.

He has seats on the Standing Rules & Orders Committee (SROC), and was a member of the Justice & Legal Portfolio committee, and was also the Chairman of the Mines and Energy Portfolio committee.

Shumba has represented Zimbabwe at the Africa Institute of Legislative Forum (2013) in Abuja, Nigeria, and also led the Zimbabwe's monitoring delegations to the 2014 South Africa National Elections, and the 2014 Namibia National Elections. He is also a member of a number of regional and international economic bodies (including the World Economic Forum).

Shumba was the head of delegation to the ACP and the joint ACP-EU Parliamentary Assembly. He chaired the ACP Standing Committee on Political Affairs at the 40th session of the ACP Parliamentary Assembly, and also chaired the Political Affairs Bureau at the 30th session of the ACP-EU Joint Parliamentary Assembly in Brussels on 4 and 8 December 2015.

On 18 January 2018, following the coup and political gamesmanship in Zanu PF, Shumba was withdrawn from the Parliament of Zimbabwe.

He was educated in Zimbabwe, Zambia and the UK. He holds an MBA and a PhD in 'International Business Strategy'. He has businesses in IT, Hospitality, Mining and Telecommunications. Shumba operates between Zimbabwe and South Africa.

Upon leaving the Defense Forces, Shumba emerged as a leading entrepreneur after setting up and managing Systems Technology, an ITC business. Systems Technology was a leading supplier of ITC equipment and services to the government of Zimbabwe, Educational Institutions, Mining sector, banks, and to other corporates.

He is a founding shareholder of Econet Zimbabwe, holding 25% shares through Mascom Zimbabwe and 10% shares through TSM Holdings. He financed Econet and bought his shares through a debt to equity swap. Shumba led the Mascom Botswana bidding process and was instrumental in the behind the scenes lobbying.

Shumba also founded and was the CEO of TeleAccess Zimbabwe (Second NTO), and TeleAccess Global Corporation (TAGC).

Shumba has launched The Advocacy Forum (The AF). He will roll out country chapters across Africa. The Advocacy Forum's main agenda is to ensure and monitor national adherence to the Rule of Law, and the tenets of Constitutionalism. The Advocacy Forum will work and collaborate with other partners in its advocacy.
