= Hubert Nyanhongo =

Zimbabwean politician

Hubert Nyanhongo was the Zimbabwe Deputy Minister of Energy and Power Development. He was the Member of House of Assembly for Harare South (ZANU-PF).
