= Masvingo Central =

Constituency of the Parliament of Zimbabwe

- Constituency for the National Assembly of Zimbabwe
- Region: Masvingo Province

Current constituency
- Seats: 1
- Party: ZANU–PF
- Member(s): Eddison Mudiwa Zvobgo

Masvingo Central is a constituency represented in the National Assembly of the Parliament of Zimbabwe, located in Masvingo District in Masvingo Province. Its current MP since the 2023 election is Eddison Mudiwa Zvobgo of ZANU–PF. Previously, the constituency was represented Edmond Mhere of ZANU–PF following the 2018 election.

== Members ==
Election	Name	Party
1990	Dzikamai Mavhaire	ZANU–PF
1995	Dzikamai Mavhaire	ZANU–PF
2000	Silas Mangono	MDC
2005	Tongai Matutu	MDC
2008	Jefferson Chitando	MDC–T
Constituency abolished 2013–2018
2018	Edmond Mhere	ZANU–PF
2023	Eddison Mudiwa Zvobgo	ZANU–PF

== See also ==
- List of Zimbabwean parliamentary constituencies
