= Zengeza West =

Zimbabwean constituency

- National Assembly constituency for the Parliament of Zimbabwe
- District: Chitungwiza
- Province: Harare
- Electorate: 35,745 (2023)

Current constituency
- Number of members: 1
- Party: Citizens Coalition for Change
- Member: Innocent Zvaipa

Zengeza West is a constituency represented in the National Assembly of the Parliament of Zimbabwe. The current MP is Innocent Zvaipa of the Citizens Coalition for Change since the 2023 election.

== Members ==
Election	Name	Party
2013	Simon Chidakwa	MDC–T
2018	Job Sikhala	MDC Alliance
2023	Innocent Zvaipa	Citizens Coalition for Change

== See also ==
- List of Zimbabwean parliamentary constituencies
