= Job Sikhala =

Zimbabwean politician (born 1972)

Job Sikhala, nicknamed Wiwa (born 1972), is a Zimbabwean politician.

== Career ==
Sikhala is the current chairman of the National Democratic Working Group, he has been the member of parliament for Zengeza West. He is formerly a member of parliament for the St Mary's constituency.

Sikhala was born in the former Rhodesia, now Zimbabwe, in 1972. He graduated from Mazungunye High School in Bikita, and went on to the University of Zimbabwe, where he received a bachelor's degree in history and economic history and a law degree. At university, he was involved with student activism.

In 1999, Sikhala joined the Movement for Democratic Change at its inception and was part of the national executive of the party. In the 2000 elections, he was elected to parliament from the St. Mary's constituency. In January 2003, he was tortured by government forces, which led to Zimbabwean cricketers Andy Flower and Henry Olonga wearing black armbands in protest during the 2003 Cricket World Cup co-hosted in Zimbabwe. In the party schism of 2005, Sikhala followed Welshman Ncube and was part of the MDC–N. In 2014 Sikhala further split from the MDC-N to create the MDC 99 faction. After the reunification of the MDC in 2018, Sikhala replaced Tendai Biti as Deputy National Chairman in May 2019.

In 2019, Sikhala was charged by the Zimbabwe government with treason. In February 2020, he was cleared of those charges. On January 30, 2024, Job Sikhala was sentenced to two years in prison, wholly suspended. He was released from custody to form a new political party called Zimbabwe Rainbow Coalition, which he is the founding President. Job Sikhala is accused by the authorities of inciting violence. He was convicted for inciting violence on social media, but managed to evade jail time after being given a nine month suspended sentence and a $500 fine.

On 30 August 2025, Sikhala's home in Chitungwiza, Harare Province was bombed by unknown assailants. Sikhala's children were home at the time, but survived without injury; Sikhala was in South Africa at the time.
