= Mavambo/Kusile/Dawn =

Political party in Zimbabwe

- Leader: Simba Makoni
- Founded: 2008
- Ideology: Technocracy
- Colours: Yellow and Green

Mavambo/Kusile/Dawn is a Zimbabwean political organisation, founded by Simba Makoni, Kudzai Mbudzi and Ibbo Mandaza.

== Zimbabwean Presidential Election of 2008 ==
Simba Makoni was the Mavambo candidate, finishing third with 8.3% of the vote in the first round.

== Zimbabwean Senate Election of 2008 ==
There were several notable Mavambo candidates who stood for the Senate of Zimbabwe, including Fay Chung, Margaret Dongo, Ibbo Mandaza, Kudzai Mbudzi, and Edgar Tekere, but none were elected.

== After the elections ==
Since the presidential elections, Makoni has several times indicated his intention to convert his Muvambo/Kusile/Dawn formation into a formal political party. On 22 July 2008, the formation's national management committee met and agreed to finalise the transformation of the project into a political party, to be known as the National Alliance for Democracy Dumiso Dabengwa ended his support for the Mavambo organisation in 2008, leaving to re-establish PF-ZAPU. In 2009, a power struggle developed within the organisation, with Kudzai Mbudzi and other leaders declaring they had removed Makoni.
