= United People's Party (Zimbabwe) =

The United People's Party (UPP) was a political party in Zimbabwe from 2006-2010. Formed by Dr. Daniel Shumba, a former provincial chairman of Masvingo and member of the Central Committee of ZANU-PF, it called for opposition to the ZANU-PF, the nation's ruling party, claiming it had subjected Zimbabweans to poverty, hopelessness and victims of misrule, greed, brutality, terror, corruption and dictatorship."

Party candidates ran for the first time in the by-elections of Chiredzi South and Zaka East in February and March 2007, respectively. In the 2008 parliamentary election, the party put forward 79 candidates for the House of Assembly and 27 for the Senate in eight of Zimbabwe's ten provinces.

Shumba (who self-funded the Party), who was the first party leader, was denied a chance to run in the 2008 Zimbabwean presidential election for allegedly arriving late to the nomination court. He later won his court application, but the judgement was issued well after the run-off elections. Other political parties feared that if the UPP received funding, it would have redefined Zimbabwe's political landscape. The UPP, like the MDC, was denied access to the media. The ZANU-PF government was also accused of suspending Shumba's TeleAccess telecommunication licence as punishment for pursuing a democratic agenda back when he was Chairman in ZANU-PF's Masvingo province division. The matter went before the courts.

Although the UPP supported a true government of national unity (GNU), the power-sharing after the 2008 elections did not include them. In October 2009, Dr Shumba resigned from politics to continue his role as a business leader in Zimbabwe, saying: "Our revolution is not just about politics, but about economic empowerment also". The party was officially dissolved in 2010, with Shumba returning as a member of ZANU-PF.

In 2018, Shumba formed another opposition party, United Democratic Alliance. At that time he declared his intention to run for president, lashing out at President Emmerson Mnangagwa’s administration as “partisan, corrupt and power hungry”.
