= Patriotic Union of Mandebeleland =

Political party in Zimbabwe

- Abbreviation: PUMA
- Leader: Leonard Nkala
- Founded: February 2006
- Ideology: Matabeleland devolution Ndebele interests Regionalism

The Patriotic Union of Mandebeleland (PUMA) is a minor Zimbabwean political party. It was launched in Bulawayo in February, 2006 by ex-ZANU PF politician Leonard Nkala. It seeks to divide Matabeleland and the Midlands into eight regions and devolve legislative and administrative power to those regions. It also supports a commission of inquiry into the deaths of more than 20,000 Zimbabweans at the hands of Robert Mugabe's government in Matabeleland in the 1980s. It supports the recruitment of local Ndebele inhabitants for State jobs in Matabeleland but denies any intention to secede from Zimbabwe.

Its launch in March, 2006 attracted 47 people, mainly Ndebeles over the age of forty.

The party contested the Zimbabwean parliamentary election, 2008, running seven candidates and gaining 523 votes (0.02%).

Along with three other minor opposition parties, PUMA is a member of the Zimbabwe Organisation of Opposition Political Parties.
