= 2008 Zimbabwean general election =

- Presidential election
- 29 March 2008 (first round); 27 June 2008 (second round)
- Registered: 5,934,768 (▲5.83%)
- Turnout: 42.75% (first round); 42.37% (second round)
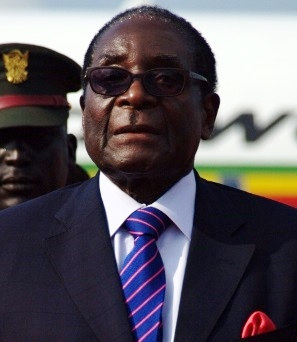

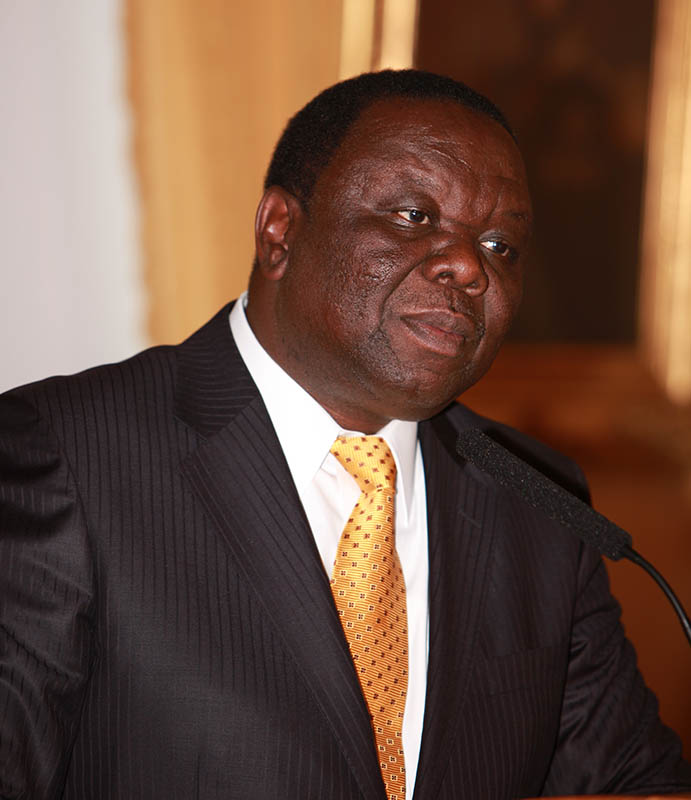
| Candidate | Robert Mugabe | Morgan Tsvangirai |
| Party | ZANU–PF | MDC–T |
| Popular vote | 2,150,269 | 233,000 |
| Percentage | 90.22% | 9.78% |
President before election
Robert Mugabe
ZANU–PF
Elected President
Robert Mugabe
ZANU–PF
- House of Assembly
- 29 March 2008
- All 210 seats in the House of Assembly; 106 seats needed for a majority
| Party | Leader | Vote % | Seats | +/– |
|---|---|---|---|---|
| ZANU–PF | Robert Mugabe | 45.84 | 99 | +21 |
| MDC–T | Morgan Tsvangirai | 42.83 | 100 | +59 |
| MDC–M | Arthur Mutambara | 8.53 | 10 | New |
| Independents | – | 2.19 | 1 | 0 |
This lists parties that won seats. See the complete results below.
- Senate
- 29 March 2008
- 60 of the 93 seats in the Senate; 47 seats needed for a majority
| Party | Leader | Vote % | Seats | +/– |
|---|---|---|---|---|
| ZANU–PF | Robert Mugabe | 45.49 | 30 | −15 |
| MDC–T | Morgan Tsvangirai | 43.56 | 24 | +17 |
| MDC–M | Arthur Mutambara | 7.97 | 6 | New |
This lists parties that won seats. See the complete results below.
- Maps
Mugabe
30-40%
40-50%
50-60%
60-70%
Tsvangirai
40-50%
50-60%
60-70%

General elections were held in Zimbabwe on 29 March 2008 to elect the president and Parliament. Because of Zimbabwe's dire economic situation, the elections were expected to provide incumbent President Robert Mugabe with his toughest electoral challenge to date. Mugabe's opponents were critical of the handling of the electoral process, and the government was accused of planning to rig the election. Human Rights Watch said that the election was likely to be "deeply flawed." The elections were characterized by violence.

No official results were announced for more than a month after the first round. The failure to release results was strongly criticised by the opposition Movement for Democratic Change, which unsuccessfully sought an order from the High Court to force their release. An independent projection placed its leader Morgan Tsvangirai in the lead, but without the majority needed to avoid a second round, whilst the MDC declared that Tsvangirai won a narrow majority in the first round and initially refused to participate in any second round. After the recount and the verification of the results, the Zimbabwe Electoral Commission (ZEC) announced on 2 May that Tsvangirai won 47.9% of the vote and Mugabe 43.2%, necessitating a run-off, which was to be held on 27 June 2008. Despite Tsvangirai's continuing claims to have won a first round majority, he decided to participate in the second round. The period following the first round was marked by political violence. ZANU–PF and the MDC each blamed the other's supporters for perpetrating the violence; Western governments and prominent Western and human rights organisations blamed ZANU–PF for the violence. On 22 June 2008, Tsvangirai announced that he was withdrawing from the run-off, describing it as a "violent sham" and saying that his supporters risked being killed if they voted for him. The second round of elections went ahead with Mugabe as the only actively participating candidate, although Tsvangirai's name remained on the ballot. Mugabe won the second round by an overwhelming margin and was sworn in for another term as president on 29 June.

In the parliamentary elections, ZANU–PF lost its majority in the House of Assembly for the first time since independence in 1980, as the two factions of the MDC won most of the seats; a month after the election, the MDC factions merged.

== Background ==
In late 2006 a plan was proposed that would have delayed the elections to 2010, at the same time as the next parliamentary election, which was said to be a cost-saving measure. This would have lengthened President Mugabe's term by two years. However, there was reportedly dissent within the ruling ZANU–PF regarding the proposal, and it was never approved. In March 2007, Mugabe said that he thought the feeling in the party favoured having the presidential election in 2008, and moving the parliamentary election up by two years instead. He also said that he would be willing to stand for another term if chosen by the party. On 30 March 2007, it was announced that the ZANU–PF Central Committee had chosen Mugabe as the party's candidate for another term in 2008, that presidential terms would be reduced to five years instead of six, and that the parliamentary election would also be held in 2008. Later, information was leaked from the same meeting that ZANU–PF had adopted the position of making Mugabe president-for-life.

On 25 January 2008, the date of the election was announced as 29 March. A spokesperson for the faction of the MDC led by Morgan Tsvangirai denounced this as "an act of madness and arrogance", while the leader of the other MDC faction, Arthur Mutambara, said that a free and fair election could not be held under the existing conditions, calling for a new constitution to be adopted prior to the election. Talks between the MDC and ZANU–PF collapsed following the announcement of the election date; the MDC had wanted the dialogue to affect the election, while ZANU–PF wanted to hold the election on schedule in March and for any changes agreed in the talks only to take effect afterwards.

== Electoral system ==
=== President ===
An amendment to the Electoral Act in 2005 meant that this was the first time a presidential candidate was required to win a majority of the vote, introducing a second round if necessary.

There were about 5.9 million registered voters and about 11,000 polling stations, compared to about 4,000 polling stations in the 2005 parliamentary election. The Zimbabwe Election Support Network said that there were insufficient polling stations in urban areas, where the opposition is considered stronger, while the availability of polling stations was better in rural areas, where ZANU–PF is considered stronger. According to the Electoral Commission, it planned to deploy 107,690 polling officers to oversee voting.

The Public Holidays and Prohibition of Business Notice 2008, published on 17 March, declared 29 March to be a public holiday. This was accompanied by the Presidential Powers (Temporary Measures) (Amendment of Electoral Act) (No. 2) Regulations, 2008, which allows police to enter polling stations. This ended a previous law, put in place in 2007 as a result of talks between ZANU–PF and the MDC, that required police to stay 100 meters away from polling stations. The regulations amended Sections 59 and 60 of the Electoral Act, providing for electoral officers and police officers to assist illiterate voters (in the case of Section 59) and physically incapacitated voters (in the case of Section 60). The change was criticised by Tsvangirai and Makoni.

Other changes agreed upon in the talks between ZANU–PF and the MDC included the posting of results outside of polling stations and the provision that, if state television aired any candidate's advertising, then it had to also air advertising from other candidates. Security laws that could be used to prevent MDC rallies were also moderated. The new rules also stipulated that presidential results may only be announced by the Zimbabwe Electoral Commission.

=== Parliament ===
The House of Assembly was expanded from 150 to 210 members, all elected, in the 2008 election, while the Senate expanding to 93 seats, 60 of which were directly elected (six from each province). There were 29 constituencies in Harare, 28 in Midlands, 26 in Manicaland, 18 in Mashonaland Central, 23 in Mashonaland East, 22 in Mashonaland West, 26 in Masvingo, 13 in Matabeleland North, and 13 in Matabeleland South, and 12 in Bulawayo. Unlike in previous elections, when constituency voter rolls were used, ward voter rolls were used in the 2008 election. The Zimbabwe Electoral Commission delimited 1,958 wards.

Prior to the election being held, ZANU–PF won two seats where it was unopposed: the House of Assembly seat from Muzarabani South, won by Edward Raradza, and the Senate seat from Rushinga, won by Damien Mumvuri. Three candidates of the MDC faction led by Mutambara died prior to the election, resulting in the elections for those seats being delayed. Glory Makwati, a candidate in the Gwanda South constituency, died in late February; this was followed on 29 February by the death of Milton Gwetu, the MP for Mpopoma, who was running for re-election. On 13 March, Abednico Malinga, another MP of the MDC Mutambara faction who was standing as a candidate, died in a car crash. He had represented Silobela constituency in the House of Assembly and was running in 2008 as a candidate in Redcliff constituency.

== Campaign ==
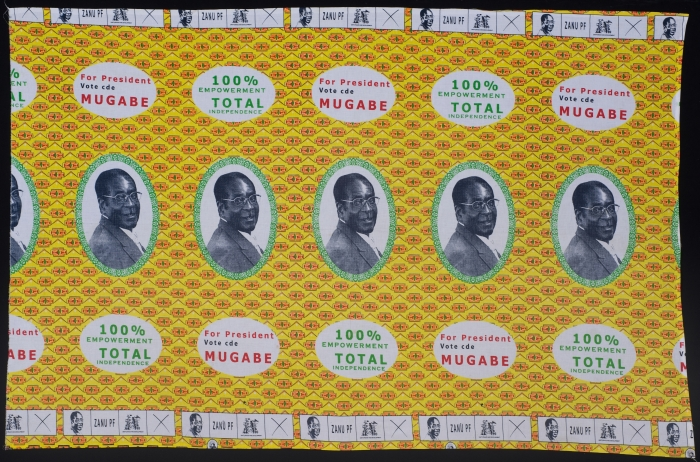
Printed cloth with images of Mugabe, produced for the 2008 election

=== Presidential candidacies ===
In 2006, ZANU–PF National chairman John Nkomo was one of the first to announce he would be ready to contest the election for ZANU–PF if Mugabe chose to retire. Abel Muzorewa, the only prime minister of Zimbabwe Rhodesia, suggested on 21 June 2007 that he might run, claiming that people were urging him to do so. However, Mugabe was chosen by acclamation as ZANU–PF's presidential candidate for the 2008 election by delegates at a December 2007 party congress. John Nkomo said that he "did not hear any dissenting voices" and that the congress had "fully and unreservedly" backed Mugabe.

Talks to unite the two MDC factions behind the candidacy of Tsvangirai, the leader of the main faction, broke down on 3 February 2008. Mutambara apologised to the people for this failure, while Tsvangirai said that unity could not be imposed by force. Analysts viewed the opposition's failure to unite as making Mugabe's re-election a near-certainty, although Tsvangirai, while expressing regret, said that he believed the opposition still had "a fighting chance" of victory.

Simba Makoni, a former Finance Minister who was a leading member of ZANU–PF, formally announced on 5 February 2008 that he would be a candidate, running as an independent, but campaigning through the Mavambo/Kusile/Dawn organisation. Joseph Chinotimba from the Zimbabwe National Liberation War Veterans Association threatened Makoni, and ZANU–PF declared Makoni to be expelled from the party; it said that anyone supporting him would be expelled as well. On 11 February, Tsvangirai confirmed that he would be the candidate of his faction of the MDC in the election, ending speculation that he might rally behind Makoni's candidacy. Although Tsvangirai said that Makoni was a patriot, he was otherwise sharply critical, saying that Makoni had "been part of the establishment for the last 30 years" and therefore shared responsibility with Mugabe for Zimbabwe's situation. He furthermore expressed his view that Makoni intended to merely "reform an institutionalised dictatorship" and was "old wine in a new bottle".

On 15 February 2008, Mugabe, Tsvangirai, and Makoni filed their nomination papers and were confirmed as candidates by Ignatius Mushangwe, the Electoral Commission's presiding officer. Mugabe's papers were submitted by Emmerson Mnangagwa, while Tsvangirai's were submitted by Nelson Chamisa; Makoni submitted his papers in person. A fourth candidate, Langton Towungana, was also confirmed, running as an independent. William Gwata of the Christian Democratic Party attempted to run, but his papers were rejected because they were judged as not meeting the criteria, while Daniel Shumba, formerly of ZANU–PF, appeared too late to submit his papers. Zimbabwe People's Party Justine Chiota also attempted to run, but the Electoral Commission rejected his nomination papers. Mutambara announced on the same day that he would not run for president and would instead back Makoni, while contesting the parliamentary election in Zengeza West. Makoni nevertheless stressed that he was running alone and was "not in an alliance with anyone".

Mugabe spoke about Makoni's candidacy for the first time on 21 February, calling it "absolutely disgraceful", comparing Makoni to a prostitute, and saying that Makoni had a self-important attitude. Mugabe also said on the same occasion that Western countries would not be permitted to send observers for the election. Also on 21 February, the MDC factions said that their dialogue with ZANU–PF, which collapsed after the announcement of the election date in January, had failed. The factions said that the outcome of the election would not be legitimate.

== Opinion polls ==
A survey, conducted by the University of Zimbabwe and reported by The Herald on 28 March, predicted that ZANU–PF would win 137 House of Assembly seats and 41 Senate seats, that the MDC faction led by Tsvangirai would win 53 House of Assembly seats and 13 Senate seats, and that the MDC faction led by Mutambara would win 18 House of Assembly seats and six Senate seats. The survey was based on the views of 10,322 participants, and all of the country's wards were represented in the survey.

== Conduct ==
=== Presidential election ===
Voting began at 7 am on 29 March and continued for 12 hours, with polling stations closing at 7 pm, although voters who were still in line at that point were allowed to continue voting. Turnout was reported to be somewhat low, and according to police the voting was for the most part calm and peaceful, although the home of a ZANU–PF parliamentary candidate in Bulawayo was bombed.

Mugabe, voting in Harare, said: "We are not in the habit of cheating. We don't rig elections." According to Mugabe, his conscience would not let him sleep at night if he tried to rig the election. Tsvangirai also voted in Harare, saying that he was certain of victory "in spite of the regime's attempt to subvert the will of the people"; he also claimed that the election could not be considered free and fair even if the MDC won. For his part, Makoni predicted that he would win with a score even higher than the 72% he had previously predicted.

The MDC said that ballot papers ran out at a polling station in Mt Dzuma constituency and in Wards 29 and 30 of Makoni South constituency (both constituencies in Manicaland). It also claimed that the indelible ink used for voting could be removed with detergent. Biti said that there was "absolutely no doubt we have won this election".

Some Zimbabweans living in the United Kingdom, New Zealand, Australia, and South Africa held protests and mock voting in response to their exclusion from the election.

The Zimbabwe Electoral Commission (ZEC) on 28 March admitted that the voters' roll to be used in the elections was "in shambles" after the opposition had unearthed 8,000 voters who according to the roll, were "normally resident" in a block that has no buildings and a shack that had 75 registered voters. This was in Hatcliffe alone.

The ZEC allegedly contravened the Electoral Act by failing to make available to the MDC a hard copy of the roll.

==== Vote counting ====
In its preliminary report on 30 March, the SADC observer mission gave the election a positive assessment, although it noted some concerns. Jose Marcos Barrica, the head of the mission, described the election as "a peaceful and credible expression of the will of the people of Zimbabwe." He said that it was free of violence and intimidation. Two members of the mission dissented from the group's report, however.

On 30 March, Tendai Biti claimed victory for the MDC at a news conference, saying that the party held the lead based on partial and unofficial results and that the trend was "irreversible". According to the MDC, results from 35% of polling stations (as posted on the doors of the polling stations) showed Tsvangirai with 67% of the vote. Leaders of the security forces and government officials had warned the opposition against announcing unofficial results. Presidential spokesman George Charamba said that if Tsvangirai's next step, after announcing unofficial results and declaring himself the victor, was to declare himself President, then that would be considered "a coup d'état and we all know how coups are handled". Meanwhile, the Electoral Commission expressed concern at the MDC's announcement of "purported results of the poll when in fact the results are being verified and collated", and it urged the people to be patient. Biti said that the MDC did not wait on the Electoral Commission's results because it did not trust the commission and did not consider it to be independent.

===== Recount =====
On 13 April, the Electoral Commission ordered a recount in 23 constituencies, which was to occur on 19 April in the presence of party representatives and electoral observers. According to Electoral Commission chairman George Chiweshe, there were "reasonable grounds for believing that the votes were miscounted and that the miscount would affect the results of this election". Chamisa said on the same day that the MDC would legally challenge the recount, alleging that it was "designed to reverse the will of the people".

According to Chiweshe, ZANU–PF candidates in 23 constituencies lodged complaints within the prescribed 48 hours after the end of voting, and therefore their complaints could be considered under the Electoral Act. However, on 13 April, Welshman Ncube, who as an MDC negotiator was involved in rewriting some contentious laws with ZANU–PF in 2007, disputed this, calling the complaints "concoctions after the fact". He accused Chiweshe of being a "blatant liar and a fraudster" and alleged that the Electoral Commission was working with ZANU–PF to change the outcome of the election, saying that the commission had the ballot boxes for over two weeks and could have tampered with them. MDC Secretary for Legal Affairs David Coltart said: "The delay between the expiry of the 48-hour period and the writing of the letters of complaint by ZEC is inexplicable, unreasonable. The only inference one can draw from the delay is that the commission has connived with ZANU–PF and therefore acted illegally." He requested proof that the complaints had in fact been made within the acceptable timeframe.

The High Court on 14 April dismissed the MDC's petition requesting the immediate release of results, and the party was ordered to pay the court costs. Although he denounced the ruling, Tsvangirai said that the MDC would not appeal it because the party did not want to contribute to any further delay by doing so. Meanwhile, Rindai Chipfunde-Vava, the Director of the Zimbabwe Election Support Network, which projected that Tsvangirai had received 49% of the vote, was arrested when arriving at the airport in Harare. He was held briefly for questioning before being released.

On 15 April, the High Court's Judge Antonia Guvava deferred hearing an MDC legal challenge regarding the recount of ballots, saying that she needed time to read Uchena's ruling dismissing the request for the release of results on the previous day. She also said that she needed time to consider whether the MDC could file new evidence that was not included in the original affidavits.

The recount of votes in 23 constituencies began on 19 April, with party representatives and foreign electoral observers present. It was initially expected to take three days, but due to delays on the first day at some polling stations, Utoile Silaigwana, the Electoral Commission's deputy chief elections officer, said on 20 April that it might take longer. Silaigwana attributed the delays to lengthy "initial consultations" and to polling agents arriving late. According to Silaigwana, the recount was "not a small exercise and we want to ensure that there are no mistakes this time around"; he said that it was going well and that there had been no complaints from either of the parties. However, MDC spokesman Chamisa denounced the process as "flawed and criminal", saying that it was a "circus" and that the government was "playing games with the people".

On 21 April 2008, a South African member of the Southern African Development Community (SADC) observer team, MP Dianne Kohler-Barnard, said that the recount was "fatally flawed". She reported repeated miscommunication of venue addresses, protocol registers at several counting stations missing, ballot box seals holding the keys for the two padlocks on each box broken. One set of ballot boxes was missing a book of voting papers from the presidential election box, although all the other books were locked inside. Loose ballot box seals with serial numbers identical to those on already-sealed boxes were easily available.

Electoral Commission chairman George Chiweshe said on 23 April that he expected presidential results to be released during the forthcoming weekend (26 April–27).

==== Possible second round, intimidation ====
Tsvangirai, while still asserting victory, said on 15 April that he would be willing to participate in a second round under certain conditions: he wanted SADC to oversee the election, for it to be conducted "transparently, freely and fairly", and for all international observers to be free to monitor it. The MDC alleged that Tapiwa Mubwanda, an election agent for the party, had been stabbed to death by supporters of ZANU–PF. The killing was confirmed by police, although they said that the motive was not yet determined. If Mubwanda was killed for political reasons, this would be the first such death to have occurred during the dispute. A group of doctors said in a statement that 157 people had been treated after suffering beatings and torture in the wake of the election.

On 17 April, Tsvangirai, speaking from Johannesburg, said that Mbeki should be "relieved of his duties" as mediator, and that he had asked Mwanawasa to "lead a new initiative, an initiative that will expand beyond that of Mr Mbeki". Meanwhile, in an interview with the BBC on the same day, Tsvangirai claimed that presidential envoys had approached the MDC on 30 March, immediately following the election, and proposed the formation of a government of national unity. According to Tsvangirai, the MDC had been willing to consider this and had also been willing to guarantee that Mugabe and other leading members of ZANU–PF would not be prosecuted; however, he said that the resistance of ZANU–PF hard-liners caused the talks to collapse after a few days. Furthermore, Tsvangirai said in the interview that, if he became president, Mugabe could be placed on trial, either by the regular courts or by a potential "justice and truth commission". He said that, although he was staying outside the country for the time being, he was not in exile and planned to return to Zimbabwe.

On 18 April, High Court Judge Guvava dismissed the MDC's application to stop the recount that was requested by ZANU–PF, ruling that the application was without merit and requiring the MDC to pay court costs. On the same day, in South Africa, the ANC backed SADC's decision to keep Mbeki in his role as mediator, despite Tsvangirai's call for him to be replaced.

==== Allegations of violence, further international response ====
United Nations Secretary-General Ban Ki-moon said on 17 April that, if a second round was held, international observers should be present. On 18 April, the foreign ministers of the G8 released a joint statement calling for the results "to be released expeditiously and in accordance with the due process of law" and for "a speedy, credible and genuinely democratic resolution to this situation". Biti met with former UN Secretary-General Kofi Annan on 18 April, and on 19 April Annan suggested that African leaders should be doing more to help resolve the situation.

In a report on 19 April, Human Rights Watch alleged that ZANU–PF members were "setting up torture camps to systematically target, beat, and torture people suspected of having voted for the MDC", both to punish them and to pressure them into voting for Mugabe in a potential second round. The group asserted that there must be high-level complicity in this and criticised SADC and Mbeki for inaction. According to Human Rights Watch, it interviewed over 30 people who had suffered injuries in the camps.

Biti, speaking at a press conference in Johannesburg on 20 April, described Zimbabwe as a "war zone" and urged the mobilisation of UN organisations in the country, saying that the situation was no longer merely a political crisis, but a humanitarian crisis as well. According to Biti, 500 MDC supporters had been attacked, 400 had been arrested, he also said that 3,000 families had been displaced. Between March and June 2008, at least 153 MDC supporters were killed. Because key members of the administration of the MDC had been arrested, the party was unable to function, according to Biti. Like Tsvangirai, Biti was staying outside of Zimbabwe, expressing fear of arrest. On 21 April, Deputy Information Minister Matonga dismissed the allegations of violence against the opposition as "lies that are being peddled by the MDC". He said that the purported ZANU–PF vigilante groups were "imaginary".

On 21 April 2008, Enos Nkala, one of the founders of the Zimbabwe African National Union and a former Defence Minister, appealed to Mugabe to retire because he had been rejected by the people. "I have information from very reliable sources that on 1 April, everyone had the results including those of the presidential elections," he said. "The President wanted to go but there are people surrounding him who have committed heinous crimes against the people of Zimbabwe and they are afraid of a change of guard... Zanu PF was formed in my house in Harare and what is happening now is not one of the reasons why it was formed... It has been hijacked by criminals and people who can not be employed if they leave government. They are also holding Zimbabweans to ransom." Meanwhile, Dabengwa, who had backed Makoni, said that Makoni's campaign had accomplished its mission by preventing either Mugabe or Tsvangirai from winning a first round majority; he opposed holding a run-off and favoured the formation of a transitional government of national unity followed by a new election.

Also on 21 April, UK Foreign Secretary David Miliband, speaking in the British Parliament, described the situation as a "constitutional crisis" and said that Mugabe was trying "to steal the election"; he also said that Mugabe and ZANU–PF had "unleashed a campaign of violence" against opposition supporters. He furthermore described the pace of vote counting as "ludicrously slow" and said that the recount could not be trusted. Meanwhile, Zuma, who described the delay in results as unacceptable, called for African leaders to "move in to unlock this logjam" by sending a mission to talk to the parties and the Electoral Commission; he said that, while Mbeki was the mediator, the "gravity of the situation" made it desirable to send other leaders to assist in resolving the situation.

On 21 April, the East Africa Law Society called an emergency Pan-African Citizens consultative meeting to be held in Dar es Salaam. It was to urge the African Union to take action on the election crisis in Zimbabwe. It brings together representatives of civil society, the legal fraternity, trade unions, academia and others.

Tsvangirai met with UN Secretary-General Ban Ki-moon at a meeting of the UN Conference on Trade and Development in Accra, Ghana, on 21 April, and he urged intervention by the United Nations and African Union.

In a joint statement on 22 April, the Evangelical Fellowship of Zimbabwe, the Zimbabwe Catholic Bishops' Conference, and the Zimbabwe Council of Churches called on SADC, the AU, and the UN to act to prevent the situation from deteriorating further, warning of the possibility of "genocide" if they did not. The statement alleged that "organised violence" was being employed against those suspected of supporting the MDC and that MDC supporters were being forced to repeat ZANU–PF slogans; it appealed for an end to voter intimidation.

At a press conference in Accra on 22 April, Tsvangirai asked African leaders to acknowledge his claimed victory and said that Mugabe needed to make a "graceful" and "honourable" exit. The Herald published an opinion piece by Obediah Mukura Mazombwe on 23 April that called for negotiations mediated by SADC that would lead to the establishment of a transitional government of national unity, including both ZANU–PF and the MDC. Mazombwe argued that the political and economic situation made holding a second round unrealistic, and that the best solution would be the formation of a national unity government that would organise an entirely new election, with Mugabe remaining President during the transition. Chinamasa said, however, that Mazombe's article did not represent the position of ZANU–PF or the government, and he reiterated that ZANU–PF was opposed to a national unity government.

Also on 23 April, Zuma said that there were other countries urging South Africa to use force in Zimbabwe, but that South Africa believed in resolving the situation through "quiet diplomacy" and negotiations. He also said that a national unity government was something worth considering and that it was not premature to discuss it as an option. In London, Zuma and Brown issued a joint statement in which they described the situation in Zimbabwe as a crisis and called "for an end to any violence and intimidation and stress[ed] the importance of respect for the sovereign people of Zimbabwe and the choice they have made at the ballot box." Brown, along with Amnesty International, additionally said that an arms embargo should be imposed on Zimbabwe, but Zuma said that he did not think that was necessary. Meanwhile, Joaquim Chissano, the former President of Mozambique, said that he and the Africa Forum, of which he is chairman, would be willing to get involved to help resolve the situation if regional leaders requested it.

Various attacks on farmers have been reported; in one instance, 10 farm workers were reportedly ambushed and beaten by ZANU–PF supporters, and in another instance a farmworker was reportedly stabbed to death. One farmer said that his family was held hostage on 23 April by war veterans seeking to force them off their property. Zimbabwean officials, however, alleged that activists of the MDC, disguised as ZANU–PF members, had perpetrated violence against the population, mimicking the tactics of the Selous Scouts during the liberation struggle. They alleged that there was a "predominance" of Selous Scouts in the MDC. The Sunday Mail published an article which claims that former Selous Scouts are training MDC youth activists in violent tactics, at locations near Tswane (Pretoria) and Pietermaritzburg in South Africa.

On 24 April, Jendayi Frazer, the US Assistant Secretary of State for African Affairs, said at the beginning of a tour of Zimbabwe's neighbouring countries that Morgan Tsvangirai was the "clear victor" of the election. However, she also said that a "negotiated solution" might be necessary. Chinamasa described Frazer's utterances as "patently false, inflammatory, irresponsible and uncalled for". In Zambia on 27 April, Frazer said that if a government of national unity was formed, it should be led by Tsvangirai.

==== MDC headquarters raid ====
Police raided the MDC headquarters, Harvest House, and the offices of the Zimbabwe Elections Support Network (ZESN) in Harare on 25 April. The Herald reported that 215 people had been arrested in the raid on Harvest House. Bvudzijena, the police spokesman, said that the police were looking for individuals who had engaged in violence following the election, specifically referring to arson attacks on "four homesteads, tobacco barns and fowl runs belonging to Zanu-PF supporters in the Mayo resettlement area in Manicaland on 16 April"; he said that those responsible for the attacks were suspected to have taken refuge in Harvest House. According to Bvudzijena, the police were screening the arrested individuals and those who had not committed a crime would be released. The MDC said that the raid involved about 250 policemen and that about 300 people in Harvest House were taken away, including people who were taking refuge from violence committed by ZANU–PF supporters and people who were seeking medical treatment at Harvest House. The party also alleged that its supporters were beaten during the raid, and, according to the MDC, the police said that they were searching for "the documents that the party has that form the basis of our claim that we won the election... Further they have taken all computers and equipment that was used by the MDC at the MDC's election command centre." Chamisa said that the police had no search warrant and that the "victims of violence" taken away by the police included women and children; he also said that MDC staff at Harvest House were arrested. Regarding the ZESN raid, The Herald reported that the police were searching for evidence that Electoral Commission officials had been bribed through ZESN to manipulate the election results. ZESN chairman Noel Kututwa said that the police "had a search warrant which stated that they were looking for subversive material which is likely to be used to overthrow a constitutionally elected government", and he said that they had seized computer equipment and files.

On 28 April, the Harare High Court ordered that all of the people arrested at the MDC headquarters be released. The police did not immediately do so, but Bvudzijena said that 29 people had been released, most of them women, the elderly, and infants; he also said that the police had asked those who had suffered from political violence to identify the individuals who were responsible for the violence. The police released the remainder of those who were arrested at the MDC headquarters on 29 April, in compliance with the High Court's order, without charge, although it continued to hold three others. Meanwhile, US President George W. Bush criticised Mugabe, saying that he had "failed" Zimbabwe, and accused the Zimbabwean government of intimidating the people; Bush also said that it was the responsibility of other countries in the region to "step up and lead" with regard to Zimbabwe.

==== UN Security Council meeting ====
The United Nations Security Council held a session on the situation in Zimbabwe on 29 April. Reportedly, the US, European and Latin American members of the Security Council wanted to send a special envoy to Zimbabwe; however, South Africa, the current holder of the Presidency of the Security Council, opposed this. Secretary-General Ban Ki-moon was said to have not yet reached a decision on the issue. Biti was present at the U.N. headquarters, hoping to convince the Security Council to send a special envoy, but the Council met without hearing his appeal. According to Biti, the "humanitarian concern" made the problem more than merely a regional or sub-regional matter, and it was something the U.N. should handle. The Zimbabwean government denounced the U.N. session as "sinister, racist and colonial", and Deputy Information Minister Matonga called it "a sign of desperation by the British and their MDC puppets".

=== Parliamentary elections ===
According to the MDC candidate for Makoni South, Pishai Muchauraya, ballot papers in wards 29 and 30 of Makoni South, which is strongly pro-MDC, ran out after two hours of voting. Muchauraya said that 300 people had voted by that point, with another 1,000 still waiting.

In Chitungwiza, a dormitory town of Harare, clashes occurred between supporters of MDC candidates from the rival factions on 30 March. This came after supporters of Marvellous Khumalo claimed victory over Job Sikhala, began celebrating, and engaged in provocations towards Sikhala. Five people were reported injured, and Klumalo and Sikhala were both arrested, along with 13 MDC activists.

== Results ==
=== President ===
| Candidate | Party | First round | | Second round | |
| Candidate | Party | Votes | % | Votes | % |
|---|---|---|---|---|---|
| Morgan Tsvangirai | Movement for Democratic Change – Tsvangirai | 1,195,562 | 47.87 | 233,000 | 9.78 |
| Robert Mugabe | ZANU–PF | 1,079,730 | 43.24 | 2,150,269 | 90.22 |
| Simba Makoni | Mavambo/Kusile/Dawn | 207,470 | 8.31 | | |
| Langton Towungana | Independent | 14,503 | 0.58 | | |
| Total | | 2,497,265 | 100.00 | 2,383,269 | 100.00 |
| Valid votes | | 2,497,265 | 98.42 | 2,383,269 | 94.77 |
| Invalid/blank votes | | 39,975 | 1.58 | 131,481 | 5.23 |
| Total votes | | 2,537,240 | 100.00 | 2,514,750 | 100.00 |
| Registered voters/turnout | | 5,934,768 | 42.75 | 5,934,768 | 42.37 |
Source: African Elections Database

Chiweshe said on 26 April that he expected the recount to be complete by 28 April. At that point, according to Chiweshe, the presidential candidates or their agents would be invited "to a verification and collation exercise, leading to the announcement of the results of the presidential election". Chief Elections Officer Lovemore Sekeramayi and the candidates agreed that during this exercise both the MDC and ZANU–PF would collate their own figures, which would be compared afterwards; if there were discrepancies, the figures would be cross-checked.

The verification and collation of presidential results was scheduled to begin on 1 May at the Harare International Conference Centre. On 30 April, Agence France-Presse reported that "sources close to the electoral commission" claimed that Tsvangirai had received about 47–50% of the vote, but not a majority. On the same day, the MDC alleged that the number of people killed in post-election violence had risen to 20, while Human Rights Watch's Africa director, Georgette Gagnon, alleged that "the army and its allies... are intensifying their brutal grip on wide swathes of rural Zimbabwe to ensure that a possible second round of presidential elections goes their way".

CNN reported on 30 April that an "unidentified senior official" credited Tsvangirai with 47% and Mugabe with 43%. Matonga said on 1 May that the government had its own results, and that according to these results a second round would be necessary, although he gave no specifics. A spokesman for Tsvangirai, speaking in Johannesburg, stated again that Tsvangirai would not participate in a second round: "If Robert Mugabe cannot accept the real results now, what's the guarantee he'll accept the real results after a runoff?" He said that the claims that a second round would be necessary were part of a government strategy to steal the election. Meanwhile, Tsvangirai said that he would return to Zimbabwe after the verification exercise is complete.

At the collation meeting on 1 May, the MDC presented their figures, which gave Tsvangirai 50.3%, thus avoiding a run-off; the ZEC tally, however, showed him with 47.8% to Mugabe's 43.2%. Emmerson Mnangagwa represented Mugabe at the meeting and Chris Mbanga represented Tsvangirai; Makoni was present in person. Talks were to continue on 2 May. MDC spokesperson George Sibotshiwe said that the MDC wanted the Electoral Commission to account for 120,000 votes which, according to the commission, went to Mugabe, although Sibotshiwe said that ZANU–PF had not claimed those votes. According to Sibotshiwe, if Tsvangirai was credited with these 120,000 votes, he would have a first-round majority.

Senegalese Foreign Minister Cheikh Tidiane Gadio met with Mugabe on 1 May; afterwards, he said that Mugabe would participate in the second round and that Mugabe had pledged to "unhesitatingly accept the results of the second round and urged the opposition to take the same approach." Tsvangirai said in an interview with France 24 on the same day that a second round could not be held in an atmosphere in which Mugabe was "unleashing violence, death squads and violence against our structures".

==== Announcement of results, run-up to the second round ====
On 2 May, Chief Elections Officer Lovemore Sekeramayi announced that Tsvangirai had received 47.9%, Mugabe had received 43.2%, Makoni had received 8.3%, and Towungana had received 0.6%. According to Sekeramayi, a second round would be "held on a date to be advised by the commission". The MDC denounced this as "daylight robbery". Biti, speaking from South Africa, alleged that the Electoral Commission had taken 50,000 votes from Tsvangirai and added 47,000 votes to Mugabe's score; he said that "Morgan Tsvangirai is the president of the republic of Zimbabwe to the extent that he won the highest number of votes" and that Tsvangirai must "be declared the president of Zimbabwe". While not entirely ruling out Tsvangirai's participation in a run-off, Biti reiterated the MDC's view that conditions in Zimbabwe did not allow for one to be held. He said that "Tsvangirai should be allowed to form a government of national healing that includes all Zimbabwean stakeholders", but said this was conditional on Mugabe immediately conceding defeat. Meanwhile, Mnangagwa said at a press conference in Harare that ZANU–PF felt "aggrieved" and had been "greatly prejudiced by the attempt by the MDC and its sponsors to tamper with the electoral system", but he said that Mugabe nevertheless "accepts the result as announced" and confirmed that Mugabe would be a candidate in the run-off.

On the same day, US State Department spokesman Tom Casey expressed scepticism regarding the potential for a free and fair second round under the circumstances, alleging that "the government has done everything it can to both delay and obscure the results" and that it was intimidating and abusing the opposition. Similarly, British Foreign Secretary David Miliband demanded an end to "violence and intimidation" and said that "any second round must be free, fair and open to international monitors". Meanwhile, Makoni said that Zimbabwe could not afford to hold a second round and that "the way forward for this country is for the political leaders to work together".

Mbeki met with religious leaders on 2 May and expressed displeasure with what he described as interference by the United States and the United Kingdom that he said was subverting his attempts at mediation. On 4 May, the US embassy and the British High Commission in South Africa expressed their support for the role of Mbeki and SADC in mediating the situation.

At a meeting in Harare on 3 May, the MDC leadership did not make a decision on whether to contest the second round; Tsvangirai participated in the meeting from Johannesburg through video link-up. On the same day, MDC Vice-President Thokozani Khupe described a run-off as "unlikely", but vowed that if one took place, the MDC would win "by an even bigger margin".

On 4 May, the Pontifical Council for Justice and Peace said that the Electoral Commission could not be relied upon to handle the second round, and it called on the UN and the AU to supervise it instead. Meanwhile, the Progressive Teachers Union alleged that violence was being directed at teachers because they often served as election officers, with the intent of deterring them from acting in that role in the second round, and threatened a strike. Jean Ping, the Chairman of the African Union Commission, arrived in Harare late on 4 May, along with the AU's political affairs commissioner, Julia Dolly Joiner, and its peace and security commissioner, Ramtane Lamamra. Ping was reported to have had "very constructive" discussions with Mugabe, as well as a "working meeting" with Chiweshe in which they "reviewed the entire electoral process from the start" and "look[ed] at all the scenarios for the coming weeks".

On 5 May 2008, Tsvangirai's spokesman George Sibotshiwe stated that the MDC had reached a decision, but that it would only be announced once the date for the run-off had been set. A meeting of SADC's political, defence and security committee in Angola resulted in a statement on 5 May calling on the Zimbabwean government to ensure security in the run-off. Meanwhile, ZANU–PF spokesman Nathan Shamuyarira called on all party members to vote for Mugabe in the second round, describing him as "a man who has transformed this country from being a colony to an independent, sovereign and dynamic state". According to Shamuyarira, many ZANU–PF supporters neglected to vote in the first round because they were sure that Mugabe would win. The party also called on its members, as well as opposition supporters, to avoid violence. The MDC alleged that five more of its supporters were killed on 5 May, bringing its claimed death toll to 25.

Chiweshe suggested on 6 May that the second round might be held after the 21-day period following the announcement of results that is specified in the Electoral Act, noting that the Electoral Commission could extend the time if necessary, although he said that the Commission intended to hold the second round as early as possible. Matonga has said that it could potentially be delayed by as much as one year. British Prime Minister Brown said on 6 May that "there must at least be an immediate end to violence and international observers must be put in place now, well ahead of the vote itself", if it was "to be considered free and fair".

On 7 May the Pan African Parliament (PAP) Observer Mission said that the ZEC had long lost control of the electoral process and its constitutional obligation has been gravely compromised. The Observer mission questioned voter registration, and the excess of ballot papers printed, and called for a "timeous intervention" by the AU and the Southern African Development Community before the situation got "out of control". On the same day, the AU released a statement calling on "all the Zimbabwe political actors to conduct their activities in a free, transparent, tolerant, and non-violent manner" and urging "Zimbabwe to implement the conditions set out in the Declaration on the Principles Governing Democratic Elections in Africa".

Kingsley Mamabolo, the head of South Africa's delegation to the SADC observer mission, said on 7 May that the second round could not take place in the existing atmosphere of violence. According to Mamabalo, Mbeki had sent a team to investigate the violence. On 8 May, the MDC raised its claimed death toll to 30, while Gertrude Hambira, the General Secretary of the General Agriculture and Plantation Workers Union of Zimbabwe, said that her union had recorded 40,000 people who had been displaced since the election. According to Hambira, the displaced persons were accused of supporting the MDC and were "attacked by a group of militias wearing army uniforms". Also on 8 May, the President of the Zimbabwe Congress of Trade Unions (ZCTU), Lovemore Matombo, and its Secretary-General, Wellington Chibebe, were arrested for allegedly inciting rebellion when speaking at a rally on May Day.

The BBC reported on 9 May that a Zimbabwean policeman had told it that there were plans to have war veterans present in polling stations during the second round, while dressed in police uniforms, to intimidate opposition supporters. On the same day, Mbeki arrived in Harare for talks with Mugabe and was met by Mugabe at the airport. Mbeki returned to South Africa after about four hours of talks.

Also on 9 May, the Zimbabwe Association of Doctors for Human Rights said that in the violence following the election, 22 people had been killed and 900 had been tortured. However, the group said that it had become "impossible to properly document all cases" due to the scale of the violence, which the group claimed had seriously worsened during May.

Tsvangirai announced at a press conference in Pretoria on 10 May that he would contest the second round, calling for it to be held within three weeks of the announcement of results. He said that the MDC had consulted its supporters before making this "very difficult" decision and that its supporters would have felt "betrayed" if he chose not to participate. However, he made his participation conditional on "unfettered access of all international observers", the "reconstitution" of the Electoral Commission, and free access for Zimbabwean media and the international press. Additionally, he wanted SADC peacekeepers to be present. He expressed his intention to return to Zimbabwe soon. Later on the same day, Tsvangirai met with Angolan President Jose Eduardo dos Santos; he told dos Santos that, if he won the election, Mugabe would still be highly regarded as the "father of the nation", apparently retreating from his suggestion in April that Mugabe could face trial.

In an interview with the Sunday Mail published on 11 May 2008, Chiweshe stated that the run-off round would not be held within the three weeks, but at a later date. He said that the Electoral Commission still needed money to be allocated by the government. Meanwhile, Chinamasa stated that the government would not consider admitting Western observers unless Western governments revoked their sanctions against Zimbabwe. Also on 11 May, 58 opposition activists in Shamva were arrested for alleged public violence. Meanwhile, speaking to the press in Harare, Chinamasa said that ZANU–PF would only consider the possibility of a national unity government after the second round was held, and he questioned why Tsvangirai would support such an arrangement if he had truly won a majority. He said that ZANU–PF was "eagerly waiting for the date so that we can put the election behind us and forge ahead with our programmes", stressing the importance of unity among the people and the need to put an end to "the current polarisation" but also drawing a sharp contrast between ZANU–PF and the MDC. According to Chinamasa, the government would pay for the second round itself, without any external assistance.

Heya Shoko, an elected MDC MP, was arrested on 12 May in connection with violence in his constituency, while the President and Secretary-General of the ZCTU appeared in court for the first time and were denied bail. Regarding Tsvangirai's anticipated return, Matonga said that any threat to Tsvangirai could be dealt with by the police, but he said that he was not aware of any such threat, remarking that "as far as we know he is on holiday, at the same time trying to drum up support for his campaign to demonise Zimbabwe."

On 13 May 2008, Tsvangirai stated that he would be willing to compete in the run-off if at least SADC election observers would be present, softening his previous demand for free access to all international observers. He also said that if a delay was necessary, the second round still needed to be held "within a reasonable period".

On the same day, a number of diplomats, including US Ambassador James McGee, were questioned by police for about 45 minutes at a checkpoint near Harare; they were also questioned when visiting a rural hospital and meeting with people who had been injured in violence following the election. The US government criticised this as "harassment". On 14 May, The Herald alleged that the diplomats were engaged in a "spirited campaign to demonise the government ahead of the presidential election run-off" and said that they had "circumvent[ed] diplomatic protocol" during their trip by going more than 40 kilometres from Harare without obtaining the Foreign Ministry's approval.

SADC Executive Secretary Tomaz Salomão said on 14 May that SADC intended to send 200 or more observers (possibly over 300) to Zimbabwe for the second round. He also said that SADC would not send any peacekeepers and urged the parties to behave responsibly. According to Salomão, SADC could not describe the situation as safe or fair for the time being, but he hoped that SADC could "create a conducive environment for everybody to be confident".

In a statement from Chinamasa on behalf of the Electoral Commission that was published in a special government gazette on 14 May 2008, it was announced that the period in which the second round must be held was extended from 21 days to 90 days after the announcement of results. The MDC denounced this as "illegal and unfair", intended to "give Mugabe and ZANU–PF time to torment and continue a campaign of violence on the MDC". The ZESN also asserted that holding the second round after 21 days would be illegal. Chinamasa, expressing confidence in a victory for Mugabe, also announced on 15 May that ZANU–PF would start campaigning for the run-off, under the theme "100 percent empowerment: Total Independence", as soon as ZEC set the date for the second round. According to Chinamasa, the campaign theme was based on ZANU–PF's view that true independence must include economic independence and that, despite the existing economic crisis, the ultimate reward for pursuing this path would be full empowerment of the people.

Amnesty International said on 15 May that violence was approaching "crisis levels", alleging that MDC supporters were being attacked in a district in Midlands Province as well as in a district in Mashonaland Central; the group placed the death toll from post-electoral violence at 22. According to Amnesty International, "local youths" were being recruited by war veterans for such attacks and the police seemed "unwilling to stop the violence", although they did arrest MDC supporters suspected of engaging in violence. On the same day, Biti also claimed that violence was increasing and placed the death toll at 33, while saying that Zimbabwe could not afford for the situation to continue for another 90 days. He said that Tsvangirai would return to Zimbabwe in the forthcoming weekend so that he could be present for an MDC campaign rally and a caucus of elected MPs. Meanwhile, Police Commissioner Augustine Chihuri met with church leaders and told them that ZANU–PF and the MDC were both orchestrating violence from rural bases, but he said that the police were working to dismantle these bases.

The ZEC published an announcement in the government gazette on 16 May 2008 stating that the run-off would be held on 27 June 2008. In an interview with The Herald on the same day, Chiweshe said that additional time was needed for the second round because "resources were depleted during the first election"; he stressed that the second round would be "just as big as any general election" and that "substantial" resources would be required. Speaking at a liberal conference in Belfast in Northern Ireland, Tsvangirai said that 27 June date was illegal and that the government was "changing goal posts to suit themselves" but reiterated his intention to participate; while expressing confidence in victory, he described the MDC as "a government-in-waiting that is not prepared to wait any more".

Addressing the ZANU–PF Central Committee on 16 May, Mugabe was sharply critical of his party's performance in the election, describing the first round result as "disastrous". He said that ZANU–PF had gone into the election "completely unprepared, unorganised" and that the entire party leadership from the national to the local level had to share the blame. Mugabe also accused the MDC of terrorising ZANU–PF supporters in rural areas and warned the MDC that it was "playing a very dangerous game".

Foreign Affairs Minister Simbarashe Mumbengegwi stated on 16 May that all observers who had been invited for the first round would automatically qualify to observe the second round, as well; this includes the AU, the Pan African Parliament, SADC and the East African Community, among others.

The ZESN alleged on 16 May that its observers were being attacked by ZANU–PF supporters and that some had been injured to the point of requiring hospitalisation. According to ZESN chairman Noel Kututwa, some of the group's observers had reported that it was "no longer safe to observe the election", but he nevertheless said that ZESN planned to "have as many polling stations covered as possible".

Although Tsvangirai had been expected to return to Zimbabwe on 17 May, MDC spokesman George Sibotshiwe announced on that day that his return had been delayed due to information the party had received regarding a claimed plot to assassinate Tsvangirai. Some observers suggested that Tsvangirai's failure to return called into his question his leadership qualities and made it appear that he was afraid of Mugabe and unwilling to risk coming to harm despite the risks taken by his supporters remaining in Zimbabwe.

On 18 May, The Guardian reported that political dissident Gibson Nyandoro had been tortured to death in military barracks – one of over thirty dissidents killed by ZANU–PF supporters, according to the British newspaper.

At a news conference in Nairobi on 19 May, Biti said that the military intelligence directorate was in charge of the alleged plot to kill Tsvangirai and that 18 snipers were involved; he claimed that military intelligence had a hit list composed of 36 to 40 names, beginning with Tsvangirai, himself, and Chamisa. Nevertheless, Biti said that Tsvangirai would return soon. Matonga said that the government had no knowledge of such a plot and that Tsvangirai was "playing to the international media gallery".

ZCTU leaders Matombo and Chibebe were released on bail on 19 May by Judge Ben Hlatshwayo. Along with other restrictions, Hlatshwayo ordered that they "not address any political gatherings" until the conclusion of their case. In a statement on the same day, Human Rights Watch called on the African Union to "publicly demand that the Zimbabwean government halt its campaign of violence, torture and intimidation", alleging that at least 27 people had been killed. Meanwhile, US State Department spokesperson Sean McCormack said that the US was working with countries in the region "to help ensure that there are the proper conditions for a free and fair runoff election", including the independence of the Electoral Commission, the presence of international observers, lack of intimidation of the opposition by the army, free media access, and the ability for the opposition to move around the country peacefully.

On 20 May, ZANU–PF Secretary for Youth Absolom Sikhosana called on the youth to vote for Mugabe. He said that many people in the first round "voted with their stomachs", hoping Tsvangirai could bring economy recovery, but according to Sikhosana "the same foreign interests who are promising an overnight turnaround in the event of a Tsvangirai presidency are the same who have destroyed the economy". Sikhosana said that, while Tsvangirai promised employment, Mugabe was offering more: "he is giving the youth the opportunity to own the means of production" and "have full charge of their environment and control their resources", which Sikhosana described as a prerequisite for national wealth. In The Herald on the same day, ZANU–PF spokesman Nathan Shamuyarira denied the existence of any plan to kill Tsvangirai, saying that it had "no foundation whatsoever except in his own dreams". Similarly, Matonga said that the claim of an assassination plot was "stupid". US Ambassador James McGee called on Tsvangirai to return, noting his security concerns but saying that "as a strong leader, he should be back showing his people that he cares every bit as much for them as they do for him."

Also on 20 May, in response to Chinamasa's proposal in the previous week to establish joint ZANU–PF/MDC committees to bring an end to the violence, Chamisa said that the MDC was willing to participate in these committees, but he nevertheless strongly criticised ZANU–PF. He said that ZANU–PF had made this offer only due to international pressure, that the violence was ongoing (by this point the MDC placed the death toll at 43), as part of a "grand plan to rig the elections" by attacking MDC supporters and displacing them from their constituencies, and he doubted that ZANU–PF would stop.

MDC MP Ian Kay was arrested on 20 May for alleged responsibility for violence in Mashonaland East, while another MDC MP, Amos Chibaya was arrested on 21 May for allegedly inciting junior officers in the police to rebel.

=== National Assembly ===
Map showing the winner of each constituency and its victory margin.

| Party | Votes | % | Seats | +/– |
|---|---|---|---|---|
| ZANU–PF | 1,111,625 | 45.84 | 99 | +19 |
| Movement for Democratic Change – Tsvangirai | 1,038,617 | 42.83 | 100 | +59 |
| Movement for Democratic Change – Mutambara | 206,868 | 8.53 | 10 | New |
| United People's Party | 8,861 | 0.37 | 0 | New |
| Peace Action is Freedom for All | 1,545 | 0.06 | 0 | New |
| Federal Democratic Union | 1,315 | 0.05 | 0 | New |
| Zimbabwe Progressive People's Democratic Party | 377 | 0.02 | 0 | New |
| ZANU–Ndonga | 756 | 0.03 | 0 | 0 |
| Zimbabwe Development Party | 608 | 0.03 | 0 | New |
| Patriotic Union of Mandebeleland | 523 | 0.02 | 0 | New |
| Christian Democratic Party | 233 | 0.01 | 0 | New |
| ZAPU–Federal Party | 195 | 0.01 | 0 | New |
| ZURD | 112 | 0.00 | 0 | New |
| Voice of the People/Vox Populi | 63 | 0.00 | 0 | New |
| Zimbabwe African National Union | 59 | 0.00 | 0 | New |
| Zimbabwe Youth in Alliance | 7 | 0.00 | 0 | New |
| Independents | 52,988 | 2.19 | 1 | 0 |
| Total | 2,424,752 | 100.00 | 210 | +60 |
| Registered voters/turnout | 5,605,204 | – | | |
Source: Election Passport, IPU

Following the election, MDC Secretary-General Tendai Biti claimed on 30 March that the Tsvangirai MDC faction had won all 12 of the House of Assembly seats from Bulawayo and five out of six Senate seats from Bulawayo, saying that the remaining Senate seat had gone to David Coltart of the Mutambara MDC faction. He also claimed an overwhelming victory for the MDC in Harare, along with victories in other parts of the country, such as Manicaland, Masvingo, and Mashonaland West.

On 31 March, after a significant delay, the Electoral Commission announced results for the first six seats. The first to be announced was an MDC victory in Chegutu West constituency, followed by five others; three of the first six seats were won by ZANU–PF and three by the MDC. Later in the day, 18 additional seats were declared, also split evenly between the parties, leaving both ZANU–PF and the MDC with a total of 12. In one of these seats, Justice Minister Patrick Chinamasa was defeated in the Makoni Central constituency. Later in the day, additional results were released, leaving Tsvangirai's MDC with 30 seats, ZANU–PF with 31 seats, and Mutambara's MDC with five seats.

By 1 April, results for 131 seats had been released: ZANU–PF had 64 seats, the MDC (Tsvangirai) had 62 seats, and the MDC (Mutambara) had 5 seats. Biti, claiming victory for the MDC, said on 2 April that the MDC had won 110 seats (99 for the Tsvangirai faction and 11 for the Mutambara faction) and that ZANU–PF had won 96.

Nearly complete results for the House of Assembly on 2 April showed ZANU–PF losing its parliamentary majority: the MDC (Tsvangirai) had 96 seats, ZANU–PF had 94 seats, the MDC (Mutambara) had nine seats, and one seat was won by an independent, Jonathan Moyo. Aside from Chinamasa, six other ministers were defeated: Joseph Made, Oppah Muchingura, Mike Nyambuya, Amos Midzi, Chen Chimutengwende, and Chris Mushohwe.

Shortly afterwards, final results for the House of Assembly showed the MDC (Tsvangirai) with 99 seats, ZANU–PF with 97 seats, the MDC (Mutambara) with ten seats, and one independent. Despite the MDC (Tsvangirai)'s lead in seats, ZANU–PF was credited with the lead in the popular vote, receiving 45.94% against 42.88% for the MDC (Tsvangirai), 8.39% for the MDC (Mutambara), and 2.79% for minor parties and independent candidates. ZANU–PF won an absolute majority of the popular vote in five provinces: Mashonaland Central, Mashonaland East, Mashonaland West, Midlands, and Masvingo. In Masvingo, although the party won 52.01% of the vote, it took only 12 of the 26 seats, while the MDC (Tsvangirai) won 41.61% of the vote and took 14 seats. The MDC (Tsvangirai) won an absolute majority in Harare and Manicaland. In Bulawayo, the MDC (Tsvangirai) won all 12 seats with 47% of the vote; it also led in Matabeleland North with about 37% of the vote. ZANU–PF won the most votes in Matabeleland South, but won only three seats; the MDC (Mutambara) won seven and the MDC (Tsvangirai) won two. ZANU–PF's loss of seats was attributed primarily to major loss of support in Manicaland and moderate loss of support in Masvingo, with support for the respective parties being considered relatively unchanged in the rest of the country. The tendency for ZANU–PF candidates to win large majorities in their strongholds, while the MDC won many of its strongholds more narrowly, was deemed a factor in the disparity between ZANU–PF's lead in the popular vote and the MDC (Tsvangirai)'s lead in the number of seats.

The Zimbabwe Electoral Commission finished the official counting late in the night of 2 April, four full days after the vote. This raised complaints from the opposition parties, which argued the government was trying to rig the vote, but in the end the opposition MDC (split between two factions) won a majority at the Assembly, with 109 of 210 seats, while the government ZANU–PF achieved 97. The single independent MP in the outgoing parliament, Jonathan Moyo, retained his seat for Tsholotsho North, narrowly beating contender Robert Ncube from the MDC-AM. The results became complete, with all 210 seats assigned, after by-elections in the constituencies of Mpopoma, Redcliff, and Gwanda South were contested on 27 June 2008. On 28 June 2008, the Zimbabwe Times reported that Samuel Sandla Khumalo won the constituency of Mpopomo for MDC-Tsvangirai by soundly defeating Minister of Information Sikhanyiso Ndlovu, the ZANU–PF candidate. On 29 June 2008, the Voice of America reported that ZANU–PF was victorious in the by-elections in Redcliff and Gwanda South. As a result, the 2008 election ultimately resulted in the House of Assembly having 110 members of the combined MDC factions (100 for the MDC-T, 10 for the MDC-M), 99 members of ZANU–PF, and one independent.

Chinamasa said on 9 April that the Electoral Commission had accepted ZANU–PF's requests for recounts in five constituencies, but rejected the requests for seven constituencies; the Electoral Commission had not yet reached a decision regarding the party's requests for nine other constituencies. The MDC filed a petition on 11 April seeking to prevent a recount; however, on 13 April, the Electoral Commission announced that there would be a full recount of both parliamentary and presidential votes in 23 constituencies. The recount was to occur on 19 April, and the presence of party representatives and electoral observers would be permitted. The recount was requested by ZANU–PF in 21 of these constituencies and by the MDC (Tsvangirai) in two of them. According to Electoral Commission chairman George Chiweshe, there were "reasonable grounds for believing that the votes were miscounted and that the miscount would affect the results of this election". MDC spokesman Nelson Chamisa said that the MDC would challenge the recount, alleging that it was "designed to reverse the will of the people".

On 14 April, an MDC lawyer said that the party had filed "about 60 applications to the Electoral Court" regarding seats in the House of Assembly, requesting that "the declarations of the results be set aside." The MDC alleged fraud, intimidation, and interference with electoral officers, saying that ZANU–PF had bought votes and that its own votes had been undercounted. On 18 April, High Court Judge Antonia Guvava dismissed the MDC's application to stop the recount that was requested by ZANU–PF, ruling that the application was without merit and requiring the MDC to pay court costs.

Lynette Karenyi, a candidate of the MDC (Tsvangirai) who was elected as MP for Chimanimani West, was arrested and appeared in court on 15 April, where she pleaded not guilty to forging the signatures of four people on the nomination papers that she submitted to the Electoral Court in February.

By 18 April, seven Electoral Commission officials had been arrested and had appeared in court. One official was charged with manipulating results for the Mazoe South House of Assembly seat, which was won by ZANU–PF's Margaret Zinyemba, in an attempt to make the MDC's Modern Chitenga the winner.

The recount of votes in 23 constituencies began on 19 April, with party representatives and foreign electoral observers present. It was initially expected to take three days, but due to delays on the first day at some polling stations, Utoile Silaigwana, the Electoral Commission's deputy chief elections officer, said on 20 April that it might take longer. Silaigwana attributed the delays to lengthy "initial consultations" and to polling agents arriving late. According to Silaigwana, the recount was "not a small exercise and we want to ensure that there are no mistakes this time around"; he said that it was going well and that there had been no complaints from either of the parties. However, MDC spokesman Chamisa denounced the process as "flawed and criminal", saying that it was a "circus" and that the government was "playing games with the people".

Dianne Kohbler-Barnard, a South African Member of Parliament and SADC observer in the election, said on 21 April that the recount was "fatally flawed"; she said that she had seen evidence of tampering with the ballot boxes, along with other problems, and that she believed the recount was being used to rig the results.

The first recount result, for Goromonzi West, was announced on 22 April; the constituency's initial result, which showed a victory for ZANU–PF in both the House of Assembly and Senate votes, had been contested by the MDC. The recount showed ZANU–PF keeping the seats it had won in the initial count: the recount for the House of Assembly seat showed ZANU–PF gaining one vote, leaving ZANU–PF with 6,194 votes and the MDC with 5,931 votes, while in the recount for the Senate seat the results were exactly the same as in the initial count. In the recount for the Zaka West House of Assembly seat and the Zaka Senate seat, which was initiated by ZANU–PF, it was announced on 23 April that the MDC had retained both seats with no changes in the vote tally. All parties expressed satisfaction with the process, and the MDC provincial chairman for Masvingo, Wilstaff Stemele, expressed confidence that the party would also retain the other seats involved in the recount. Silaigwana said on the same day that "recounting in all the remaining constituencies is about 75 percent complete except in Silobela and Masvingo Central", and he anticipated that full results would be ready by the forthcoming weekend (26–27 April).

The recount was completed in Zvimba North on 23 April. Results on 25 April showed ZANU–PF candidate Ignatius Chombo, who had won in the initial count for Zvimba North, retaining the seat with an increased margin: he gained 155 votes, while MDC (Tsvangirai) candidate Ernest Mudimu gained 13 votes and MDC (Mutambara) candidate Shelton Magama lost 28 votes. Some ballots that had not been included in the initial count were found and included in the recount total. Meanwhile, recount results for the Zvimba Senate seat showed the winner of the initial count, ZANU–PF candidate Virginia Muchenje, retaining the seat; her total increased by 261 votes, while MDC (Tsvangirai) candidate Fidelis Chiramba's total increased by 295.

During the recount in Gutu, General Vitalis Zvinavashe, who was the ZANU–PF candidate for the Gutu Senate seat but lost to the MDC's Empire Makamure, told other ZANU–PF candidates on 23 April that they needed to "accept the reality" that the MDC had won, and he stressed that the importance of preserving peace. He blamed Mugabe for the ZANU–PF candidates' defeat, saying that the people of Masvingo had rejected Mugabe and that the parliamentary candidates suffered as collateral damage.

Silaigwana said on 25 April that the candidates for Chiredzi North, Gutu Central, Gutu North, Gutu South, Buhera South, Lupane East, and Mberengwa South constituencies had all retained their seats in the recount. Of these, Chiredzi North and Mberengwa South had been won by ZANU–PF, Gutu Central, Gutu North, Gutu South, and Buhera South had been won by the MDC (Tsvangirai), and Lupane East had been won by the MDC (Mutambara).

It has been claimed, based on the initial recounts, that the recount strategy of ZANU–PF has failed because neither side is gaining or losing seats.

On 28 April 2008, Tsvangirai and Mutambara announced at a joint news conference in Johannesburg that the two MDC factions were reuniting, enabling the MDC to have a clear parliamentary majority. Tsvangirai said that Mugabe could not remain President without a parliamentary majority. On the same day, Silaigwana announced that the recounts for the final five constituencies had been completed, that the results were being collated and that they would be published on 29 April.

Emmerson Mnangagwa, acting as President Mugabe's election agent, said on 2 May that ZANU–PF had filed petitions challenging the results of 53 constituencies won by the MDC; similarly, the MDC has challenged the result in 52 seats. Courts have six months to consider the appeals, and another six months for counterchallenges; however, lawyers said that the elected MPs could still be sworn in. In order to handle the burden of considering so many petitions, Chief Justice Godfrey Chidyausiku appointed an additional 17 High Court judges to the Electoral Court on 29 April, with the appointments being effective until 29 April 2009; previously there had been only three judges on the Electoral Court. Rita Makarau, the Judge President of the High Court, said on 9 May that the cases would have to be completed within six months and that any requests for it to be delayed beyond that would not be accepted.

According to Chinamasa, speaking to the press in Harare on 11 May, the newly elected MPs would not be sworn in until after the second round of the presidential election.

Reportedly, twenty ZANU–PF lawmakers have joined the opposition; if that is true, they will have to face by-elections, as crossing the floor automatically causes a by-election to be called for the respective constituency under Zimbabwean electoral law.

In response to the delay in the sitting of the new Parliament, the MDC held a symbolic meeting of MDC MPs at a conference center in Harare on 30 May. Tsvangirai declared on this occasion that the MDC was the new ruling party and reaffirmed that the MDC factions would cooperate. He said that the MDC's legislative program would be "based on the return of fundamental freedoms to the people of Zimbabwe" and that the party intended to immediately abolish legislation that it considered repressive. A new "people-driven constitution" would follow within 18 months, according to Tsvangirai, and a "truth and justice commission" would be established. He also pledged that the party would introduce a new strategy to bring inflation under control and said that there would be measures to "compensate or reintegrate" farmers who lost their land as part of land reform.

=== Senate ===
On 3 April, the Electoral Commission said that the announcement of Senate results was being delayed because of "logistical problems". Late on the same day, the Electoral Commission released the first Senate results: five seats for ZANU–PF and five for the MDC. On 4 April, ZANU–PF Secretary for Administration Didymus Mutasa said that ZANU–PF intended to contest the results of 16 House of Assembly seats. Describing the election as the worst he had ever seen, Mutasa alleged that some Electoral Commission officials had taken bribes to manipulate the results in favour of the MDC and said that some had confessed to this. He also alleged that some Electoral Commission officials had instructed voters to vote for opposition candidates.

Final Senate results were released on 5 April, showing the MDC and ZANU–PF with 30 seats each.

| Party | Votes | % | Seats |
|---|---|---|---|
| ZANU–PF | 1,102,230 | 45.49 | 30 |
| Movement for Democratic Change – Tsvangirai | 1,055,514 | 43.56 | 24 |
| Movement for Democratic Change – Mutambara | 193,068 | 7.97 | 6 |
| United People's Party | 25,122 | 1.04 | 0 |
| ZANU–Ndonga | 2,196 | 0.09 | 0 |
| ZAPU–Federal Party | 734 | 0.03 | 0 |
| Patriotic Union of Mandebeleland | 320 | 0.01 | 0 |
| Multi-Racial Christian Democrats | 308 | 0.01 | 0 |
| Federal Democratic Union | 303 | 0.01 | 0 |
| Zimbabwe Progressive People's Democratic Party | 124 | 0.01 | 0 |
| Independents | 43,061 | 1.78 | 0 |
| Total | 2,422,980 | 100.00 | 60 |
Source: Kubatana

== Reactions ==
Zambian President Levy Mwanawasa called an emergency meeting of SADC leaders for 12 April to discuss the post-election impasse. According to Mwanawasa, Zimbabwe's "deepening problems" meant that the issue needed to be "dealt with at presidential level". Jacob Zuma, meanwhile, said that he thought results should have already been announced, and he described the failure to release them as "unprecedented".
