= Bucha =

Bucha may refer to:

== Places ==
=== Germany ===
- Bucha, Saxony-Anhalt, a village
- Bucha, Saale-Holzland, Thuringia, a small municipality
- Bucha, Saale-Orla, Thuringia, a small village

=== Ukraine ===
- Bucha, Ukraine, a city in Kyiv Oblast
- Bucha (village), Ukraine, in Kyiv Oblast
- Bucha Raion, a region of Ukraine

== People ==
- Heather Bucha, actress and author, wife of Frank Whaley
- Johnny Bucha (1925–1996), U.S. baseball player
- Karin Bucha (1906–1971), German writer
- Karl Bucha (1868–1939), German musician
- Malik Khuda Bakhsh Bucha (1905–2002), Minister of Agriculture for Pakistan
- Nimra Bucha (active from 2006), Pakistani television actress
- Paul Bucha (1943–2024), U.S. Medal of Honor recipient and American Vietnam War veteran
- Pavel Bucha (born 1998), Czech football player
- Sana Bucha (born 1977), Pakistani television journalist

== Other uses ==
- Battle of Bucha during the 2022 Russian invasion of Ukraine
  - Bucha massacre, the killing and abuse of Ukrainian civilians by Russian troops
- Bucha effect, a seizure-inducing flashing light effect
- FC Bucha, Bucha, Kyiv, Ukraine; a soccer team

== See also ==
- Kombucha, or 'bucha
- Bocha
