= Buhera District =

- District
- Location of Buhera District within Zimbabwe
- Country: Zimbabwe
- Province: Manicaland

Population (2019)
  - Total: ▲245,878
- Time zone: UTC+2 (CAT)

Buhera District is a district in Manicaland Province, in eastern Zimbabwe.

== Geography ==
The district is located in Manicaland Province, in southeastern Zimbabwe. It is bordered by Chikomba District and Wedza District to the north, both in Mashonaland East Province. Mutare District lies to the east. Chimanimani District and Chipinge District lie to the southeast. Gutu District in Masvingo Province lies to the south and west of Buhera District. The district offices are located at Buhera settlement, Buhera, is located approximately 170 kilometres (110 mi), by road, southwest of Mutare, the location of the provincial headquarters. Key urban settlements include Buhera (district capital), Murambinda town, Birchenough Bridge and Dorowa mine.

The Save River forms the eastern and northeastern boundary of the district with Chipinge, Chimanimani, and Mutare districts. The Devure River, a tributary of the Save, and its tributary the Nyazvidzi forms the western boundary and chikomba district forms the northern and northwest boundary.

== Overview ==
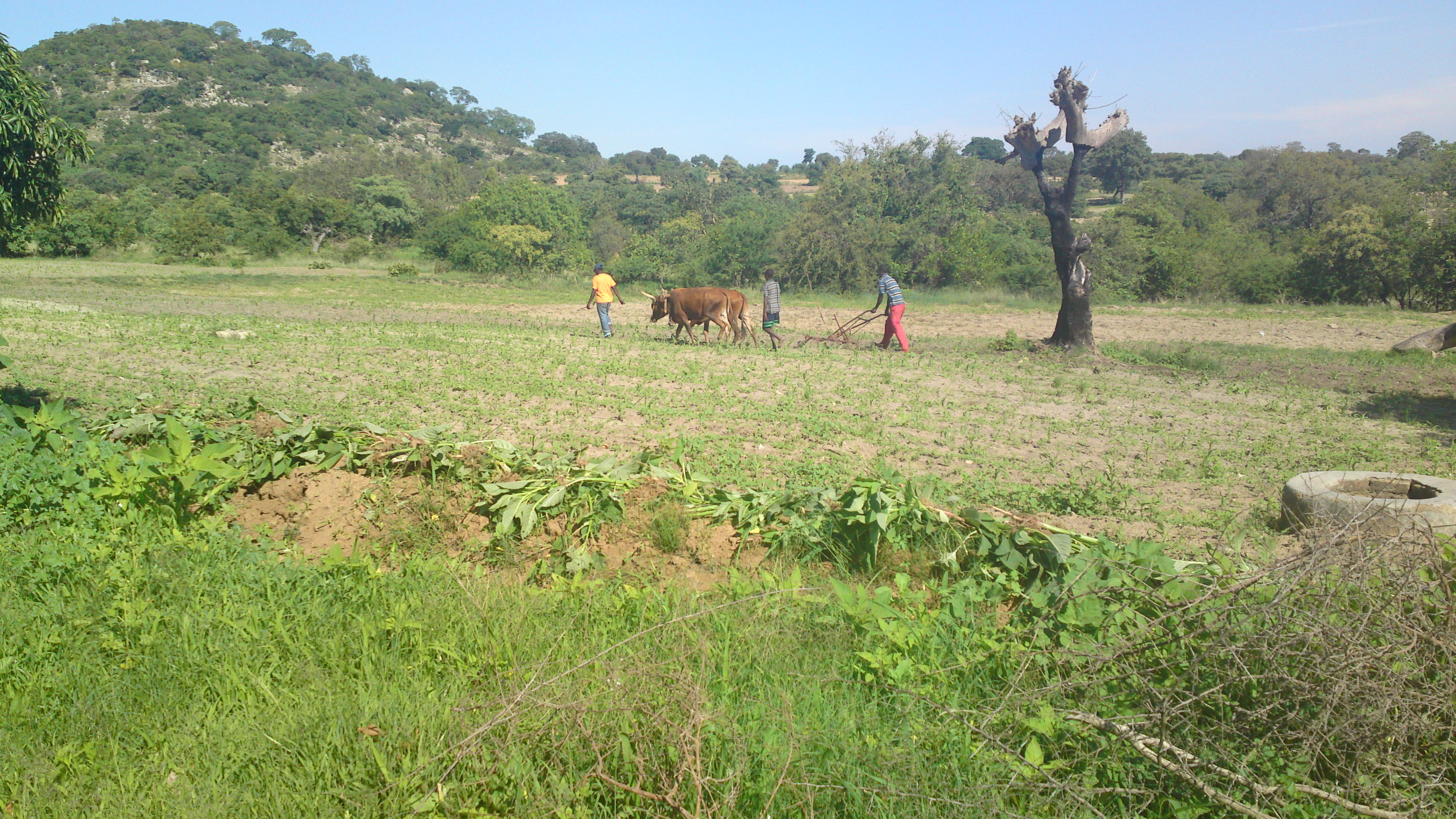
Agriculture in Buhera District

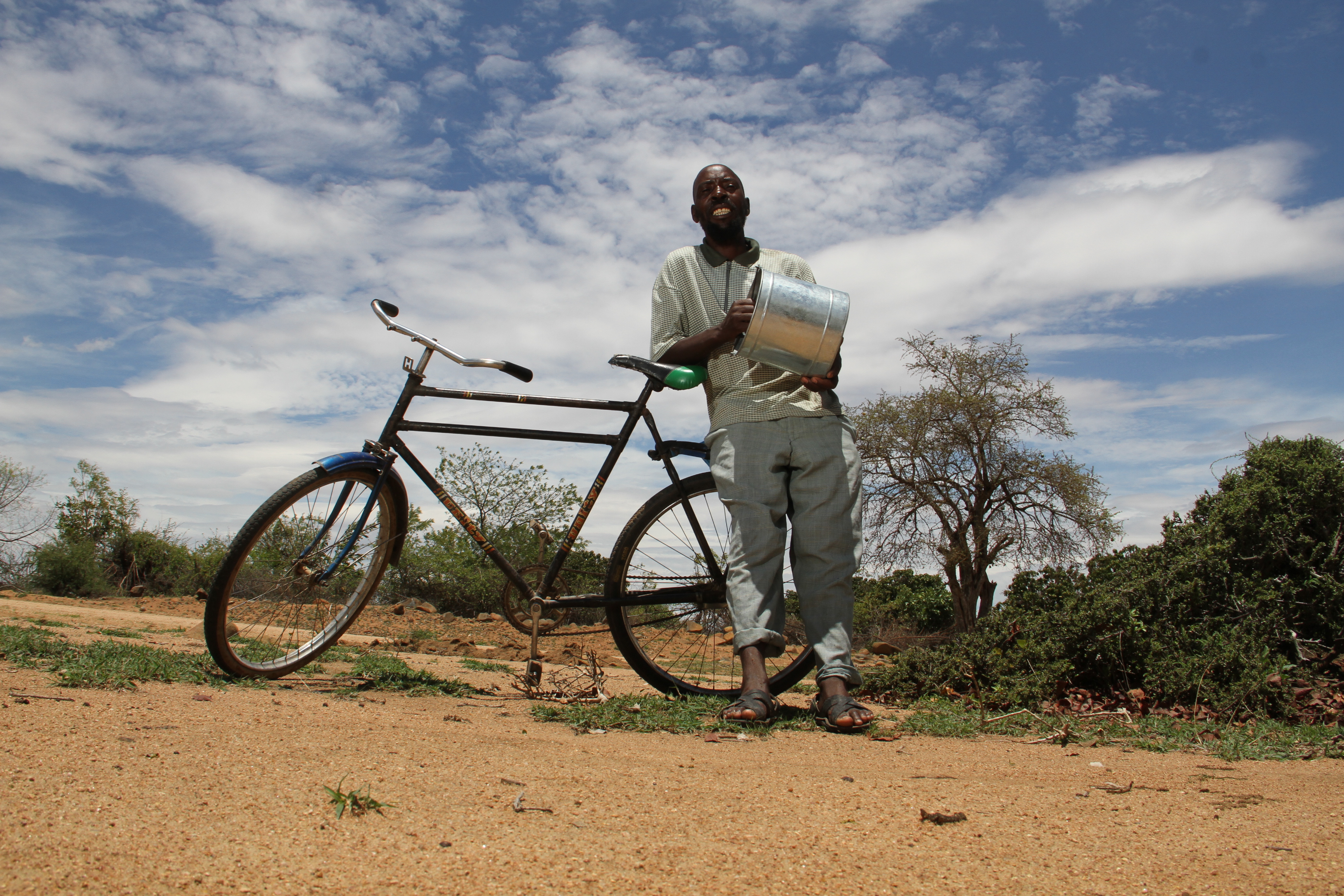
Man cycling on a road in Buhera District

Buhera District is a rural district. The local economy depends mainly on farming. The main crops are: maize, millet (mhunga), roundnuts (nyimo) and groundnuts (nzungu). Cattle ranching is also practiced in the district. Although the rains are not very reliable, the area is fertile with several irrigation schemes for the populace to supplement their meager harvests. However the schemes are now in sorry state due to government neglect. The ranching and wildlife make life enjoyable and fruitful. The largest employer in the district is Dorowa Minerals, a phosphate mine, which employs about 300 people.

The highest mountain in Buhera is Maremare near Mutiusinazita in Buhera South.

== Administration ==
The district is divided into 33 administrative wards.

Buhera is divided into four National Assembly parliamentary constituencies: Buhera Central, Buhera North, Buhera South, and Buhera West.

== History ==
The name Buhera is a Nguninised, then Anglicised version of the name uHera. uHera means territory of the Hera and is reference to the fact that the Hera sub-tribe of the Manyika tribe lived in the area and in neighbouring Chikomba District. The vaHera of the Museyamwa totem occupy most of the Buhera territory (under Chief Nyashanu) and much of neighbouring Chikomba (under chief Mutekedza).

The Hera are of the Manyika tribe and claim that they came from Guruuswa, which has been identified as an area north of the Zambezi River, perhaps around Uganda or South Sudan. Chiurwi Mountain was a major staging point for ZANLA liberation forces, during the Second Chimurenga War (1966–1979).

== Population ==
Historical population
Year	Pop.	±%
1992	203,909	—
2002	220,060	+7.9%
2012	245,878	+11.7%
Source: Zimbabwe National Statistics Agency (ZIMSTAT)

During the 2012 district census, the population of the district was estimated at 245,878. The majority of the district residents are subsistence farmers, through a communal land system administered by the local chiefs. There are two designated urban areas in the district, namely; Murambinda and Birchenough Bridge.

== Education ==
The district has a total of 140 primary schools and 55 secondary schools in 2004.

== Notable people ==
The notable people associated with the district include the following:

- Morgan Tsvangirai – The former prime minister of Zimbabwe, MDC Leader has roots in Buhera District.
- Joseph Chinotimba – current ZANU–PF Member of Parliament for Buhera
- Gideon Gono – Governor of the Reserve Bank of Zimbabwe is a native of Buhera District.
- George Charamba, President Mugabe's spokesperson and Permanent Secretary of Media and Information is also from Buhera.
- The late political activist and University Professor John Makumbe hailed from Marenga in Buhera.

== See also ==
- Districts of Zimbabwe
- Provinces of Zimbabwe
- Geography of Zimbabwe
- Economy of Zimbabwe
- Murambinda
- Birchenough Bridge
- Sanga
