= Vote counting for the 2008 Zimbabwean presidential election =

In its preliminary report on 30 March, the SADC observer mission gave the election a positive assessment, although it noted some concerns. Jose Marcos Barrica, the head of the mission, described the election as "a peaceful and credible expression of the will of the people of Zimbabwe." He said that it was free of violence and intimidation. Two members of the mission dissented from the group's report, however.

On 30 March, Tendai Biti claimed victory for the MDC at a news conference, saying that the party held the lead based on partial and unofficial results and that the trend was "irreversible". According to the MDC, results from 35% of polling stations (as posted on the doors of the polling stations) showed Tsvangirai with 67% of the vote. Leaders of the security forces and government officials had warned the opposition against announcing unofficial results. Presidential spokesman George Charamba said that if Tsvangirai's next step, after announcing unofficial results and declaring himself the victor, was to declare himself President, then that would be considered "a coup d'état and we all know how coups are handled". Meanwhile, the Electoral Commission expressed concern at the MDC's announcement of "purported results of the poll when in fact the results are being verified and collated", and it urged the people to be patient. Biti said that the MDC did not wait on the Electoral Commission's results because it did not trust the commission and did not consider it to be independent.

== Official results delay ==
Anxiety increased as more than 24 hours passed with no announcement of any official results. Judge George Chiweshe, the Chairman of the Electoral Commission, said that it was taking longer to count the ballots than it had in the past because there were four separate elections occurring at once (for President, for the House of Assembly, for the Senate, and for local councils).

Parliamentary results, but not presidential results, began to be announced by the Electoral Commission on 31 March. The MDC continued to claim victory for Tsvangirai, and there was speculation that the delay in announcing results was being used to facilitate rigging. British Foreign Secretary David Miliband urged the immediate release of results, and White House spokesman Tony Fratto said that it was "concerned" by the delay.

== Unofficial projections ==
According to projections issued by the Zimbabwe Election Support Network (ZESN) late on 31 March, Tsvangirai was ahead with 49.4% to Mugabe's 41.8%; Makoni had 8.2%, and Towungana had 0.6%. On 1 April, MDC vice-president Thokozani Khupe said that, based on results from all but 27 constituencies, Tsvangirai had 56% of the vote and Mugabe had 37%. On the same day, the Electoral Commission invited the presidential candidates or their election managers to be present as results are collated, and Tsvangirai said that he would not declare victory until the Electoral Commission announced official results. Tsvangirai also denied rumours that the MDC was engaged in talks with Mugabe. The Electoral Commission said that some ballot boxes were still arriving from the provinces.

On 2 April, Biti said that Tsvangirai had won in the first round with 50.3% against 43.8% for Mugabe. The Herald reported on the same day that a second round was likely, and Biti, saying that "state media has already begun to prepare the people for a run-off in 21 days", affirmed that the MDC would participate in a second round if it was necessary. The government criticized the MDC for declaring victory prior to the announcement of official results, with Deputy Information Minister Bright Matonga calling it "wishful thinking" and warning the MDC to "be very careful".

Matonga said on 3 April that ZANU-PF was "ready for a run-off". He said that it had "let the president down" and had "only applied 25% of [its] energy into this campaign", but that it would "unleash the other 75%" in the second round. Mugabe also made his first appearance since the election, meeting with African observers.

== Fears of a crackdown ==
On 3 April 2008, rooms at the Meikles Hotel in Harare that were being used by the MDC as offices were ransacked; Biti alleged that the police or the Central Intelligence Organisation was responsible and accused Mugabe of "start[ing] a crackdown." Biti said that he and others had been targeted. In another incident, police arrested several foreign correspondents at a hotel, including Barry Bearak, a correspondent of The New York Times. On 4 April, police spokesman Wayne Bvudzijena said that Bearak and a reporter from the United Kingdom had been charged with practising without accreditation, but that two others would soon be released. According to Bvudzijena, "so many other foreign journalists ... have followed the laid-down procedures and are practising legally", but the two reporters who had been charged "thought they were a law unto themselves". The attorney-general said that the charges against the reporters were baseless and they were dropped; however, the police kept them in custody and charged them with observing an election without accreditation, this time under the electoral law instead of the media laws. The two were released on bail on 7 April, although they were ordered to remain in the capital and appear in court on 10 April.

On 4 April, the ZANU-PF Politburo held a meeting that lasted about five hours, and afterwards ZANU-PF Secretary for Administration Didymus Mutasa announced that the party had decided that, if a run-off was necessary, Mugabe would participate. Meanwhile, about 400 pro-Mugabe war veterans, who were described in a report from The Times as Mugabe's "most feared thugs", marched silently through Harare in what was viewed as an attempt to intimidate the opposition. The MDC faction led by Mutambara said that it would back Tsvangirai in a second round, stressing that removing Mugabe from power was its highest priority.

== Delays in release of results, High Court hearing ==
Speculation in early April included the possibility that the 21-day period between the first and second rounds would be extended to 90 days by a presidential decree. A coalition of groups known as the National Constitutional Assembly criticised the failure of the Electoral Commission to release results up to that point, noting that all results had been posted outside of the polling stations and saying that it considered the Electoral Commission's explanations for the delay to be "inadequate". The coalition also said that, "given the anxiety that is gripping the country", it would be "unacceptable" to delay a second round to 90 days after the first round, expressing concern that this could lead to "a serious constitutional and political crisis".

On 4 April, the MDC filed an application at the High Court, seeking the release of results. The MDC's case before the High Court was scheduled to be heard at noon on 5 April, but police barred MDC lawyers from entering the High Court building; the Electoral Commission requested that it be given more time to prepare a response, and the hearing was delayed until 6 April.

There was initial confusion that the official results be released within six days of the election, subsequently denied. On 4 April, the MDC filed an application at the High Court, seeking the release of results.

The High Court hearing on the MDC's request that the Court order the immediate release of results was held over nearly four hours on 6 April. The Electoral Commission argued that the High Court had no jurisdiction in the matter. High Court Judge Tendai Uchena was expected to issue a ruling on 7 April; on that day he ruled that the court did have jurisdiction and said that he would decide whether to treat the case as urgent on 8 April.

High Court Judge Uchena ruled on 8 April that the court would treat the MDC's request for the release of results with urgency.

On 9 April, Makoni said that, like the MDC, he is in the dark regarding the whereabouts of the presidential election material. He demanded that the Electoral Commission release results immediately.

The Zimbabwe Electoral Commission (ZEC) was reported to have closed down operations at its national command centre. According to Utoile Silaigwana, the deputy chief elections officer, operations did not cease but were merely scaled back, and he said that it was not necessary to keep equipment at the command centre.

Electoral Commission lawyer George Chikumbirike said that the MDC's request to the High Court was "unreasonable" and should be dismissed; he argued that the Electoral Commission needed time to finish collating and verifying results and that it "would be dangerous ... to give an order [to release results] because it might not be complied with ... because of outside exigencies which [the ZEC] will be unable to control". Uchena said on 9 April that he would deliver a ruling on 14 April.

On 11 April, the ZEC said its hands were tied with regard to the release of the presidential poll results because the matter was still before the High Court.

== MDC statements, international response ==
Tsvangirai, insisting that he had won in the first round, alleged on 5 April that Mugabe was planning to use violence in a second round "to reverse the people's will", and he claimed that the Reserve Bank was printing money to fund the violence. He demanded that Mugabe concede defeat "to allow us to move on with the business of rebuilding and reconstructing the country". Tsvangirai said that he wanted to engage in a dialogue with Mugabe that would lead to "a peaceful, orderly and democratic transition", and he assured Mugabe that his safety would be guaranteed if he stepped down. He also said that he had begun consultations on the creation of a national unity government. The MDC called on the United Nations to intervene in the situation.

On 7 April, Tsvangirai was reported to be in South Africa to take part in "private meetings", and he was said to have met with African National Congress leader Jacob Zuma. On the same day, Tsvangirai wrote in the British newspaper The Guardian: "Major powers here, such as South Africa, the U.S. and Britain, must act to remove the white-knuckle grip of Mugabe's suicidal reign and oblige him and his minions to retire." He subsequently met with the President of Botswana, Ian Khama, and spoke in a radio interview about "creating a government that will have space for everyone", although he said that Mugabe himself should have no role because he had served "long enough". With the MDC having effectively won control of the House of Assembly, he said that if Mugabe remained President he would be a "lame-duck" and a "constitutional crisis" would result.

Meanwhile, the MDC accused the government of trying to provoke its opponents into violence so that it could justify imposing a state of emergency. MDC Secretary-General Biti described the response of other African leaders to the situation as a "deafening silence"; he warned of the possibility of bloodshed, invoking the example of the Rwandan genocide, and he urged the rest of Africa to intervene. The EU's Javier Solana expressed concern that African leaders had been unable to contact Mugabe.

In an interview on 9 April, Tsvangirai said that "a de facto military coup" was taking place, alleging that troops were being deployed to intimidate people into voting for Mugabe in a potential run-off and that "military leaders in the establishment are trying to subvert the will of the people". He said that he was using his trips to neighbouring countries to argue that they should help to resolve the situation, because "political chaos and dislocation" in Zimbabwe would not be in the interest of the region. On the same day, Makoni said that, regardless of who won the election, a government of national unity was needed.

On 10 April, Archbishop Buti Tlhagale OMI, president of the Southern African Catholic Bishops Conference, said that the Zimbabwean situation had become a matter of regional, continental and international concern:

As President of the Southern African Catholic Bishops' Conference and on behalf of the Catholic Community in Southern Africa, I call on the leaders of the Southern African Development Community and the African Union to act swiftly to defuse this tension by mandating a mediator of sufficient international repute, such as Kofi Annan, to ensure a solution that is acceptable to all Zimbabweans."

== Ruling party statements, farm invasions ==
The Sunday Mail reported on 6 April that, according to Justice Minister Patrick Chinamasa, the MDC had approached ZANU-PF in hopes of forming a national unity government, but ZANU-PF rejected this. Chinamasa said that the MDC made this proposal in hopes of avoiding a run-off, which he predicted ZANU-PF would win; he said that ZANU-PF rejected the proposal because it felt the run-off needed to go ahead for legal and democratic reasons (noting that ZANU-PF's "figures, based on polling station returns, clearly show that there is need for a run-off of the presidential election") and because the ideologies of the parties were completely opposed. Biti denied Chinamasa's claim, calling it "nonsense".

On 7 April, The Herald quoted Mugabe as saying "The land is ours, it must not be allowed to slip back into the hands of whites." Amidst reports that white former farm owners were returning to their old land in expectation of an MDC victory, ZANU-PF supporters invaded at least 23 white-owned farms in Masvingo Province and Centenary number of white-owned farms, according to the Commercial Farmers Union. The Union said that in Masvingo the police were "very cooperative" and were removing the militants, but that the militants kept returning, and he alleged that the invasions were "being co-ordinated from higher up the chain of command". By 8 April, the invasions were reportedly escalating; the Commercial Farmers Union said that at least 35 farmers had been forced to leave their properties and about 12 others had left in anticipation of violence. On the next day, it said that more than 60 farmers had been expelled from their properties.

Jabulani Sibanda, the National Chairman of the Zimbabwe National Liberation War Veterans Association, said on 10 April that no farm invasions were occurring. He said that the war veterans were merely investigating to ensure that white farmers were not trying to reclaim properties they had lost during land reform. According to Sibanda, if people had been expelled from their farms, the war veterans were not responsible for it.

The Herald reported on 9 April 'Tsvangirai begs for VP post' – asking Zanu-PF to accommodate him as one of the Vice Presidents in a government of national unity.

Chinamasa replied to the MDC's call for international intervention by saying that nothing had occurred to warrant it, and he alleged that the MDC was seeking to destabilise Zimbabwe by claiming victory for Tsvangirai.

On 13 April, Information Minister Sikhoanyiso Ndlovu said the Zimbabwean army will not intervene against civilians and soldiers will remain in their barracks.

== Recount requested, arrest of electoral officials ==
On 5 April, The Herald reported the arrest of an elections officer in Midlands Province in connection with alleged vote manipulation intended to benefit the MDC by altering vote totals. The Sunday Mail reported on 6 April that ZANU-PF had requested that votes in the presidential election be recounted and audited, and that the results be delayed due to "errors and miscalculations" involving the reduction of the number of votes received by Mugabe at polling stations, before the results were sent to the central command center. The party specifically alleged problems in the four constituencies of Mberengwa, where it said the results were "grossly irregular and (in their current form) cannot stand up to scrutiny". The paper also reported that some officials for the Electoral Commission in the Midlands had been arrested.

Late on 7 April, police spokesman Bvudzijena announced that the police had "established that there was deflation of figures in respect of ... the Zanu PF presidential candidate". Bvudzijena said that the police were continuing to investigate such allegations in a number of constituencies across the country, and he said that five electoral officials, in Masvingo, Manicaland and Mashonaland Central provinces, had been arrested in connection with the alleged fraud, in which Mugabe was said to have lost 4,993 votes. On 9 April, two more Zimbabwe Electoral Commission officials were arrested in Matabeleland North Province. The MDC's Nelson Chamisa said that the claim that the MDC had worked with electoral officials to rig the election was "ridiculously impossible" and alleged that ZANU-PF was seeking to distract people from the fact that results had still not been released.

On 8 April, Innocent Gonese, the MDC secretary for legal and parliamentary affairs, said the country's electoral law act is clear that a recount applies only to parliamentary elections, to be contested within a period of 48 hours. He said there was no procedure for recounting of votes in respect of the presidential elections.

By 9 April, speculation involved the possibility that, rather than a second round, the presidential election could be held over again entirely as a result of ZANU-PF's allegations of fraud. Didymus Mutasa said at this time that rigging had been so serious that the results should not be announced, because to do so would mean releasing "wrong results". Aside from the alleged reduction in the number of Mugabe's votes at the polling stations, Mutasa said that some people, after voting at one polling station, passed their identity cards to others, who would in turn vote at the other four polling stations in a ward (each ward having five polling stations). Mutasa also alleged that the arrested electoral officials had been trained in fraud techniques in South Africa by Canadian agents who were paid by the MDC.

On 2 May 2008, a U.K. Foreign Office spokeswoman said that 99 electoral commission officials had been arrested in the previous month.
