= Ngonyezi Pumped Hydroelectric Energy Storage Power Station =

Power station in Zimbabwe

- Map of Zimbabwe showing the location of Ngonyezi Power Station. Ngonyezi Pumped Hydroelectric Energy Storage Power Station (Africa) Ngonyezi Pumped Hydroelectric Energy Storage Power Station (Earth)
- Country: Zimbabwe
- Coordinates: 18°46′41″S 32°29′14″E
- Purpose: Power
- Status: Proposed
- Construction cost: US$700+ million
- Owner: Ngonyezi Projects Limited
- Operator: Ngonyezi Power Company

Dam and spillways
- Type of dam: Run of river
- Impounds: Odzi River

Power Station
- Installed capacity: Hydro:2,000 megawatt-hours (7,200 GJ); Solar:300 megawatts (400,000 hp)

Ngonyezi Pumped Hydroelectric Energy Storage Power Station, also Ngonyezi Power Station, is a planned 2,000 megawatt-hours (7,200 GJ) hydroelectric power station, across the Odzi River, a tributary of the Save River, in Zimbabwe. The power station is under development by Ngonyezi Projects Limited (NPL), a company based in Pretoria, South Africa. NPL will also build a floating solar farm on the existing Osborne Dam reservoir with capacity of 300 megawatts. On sunny days, the solar farm will supply energy to the grid directly. When the sun goes down or on cloudy/rainy days or during peak hours, the stored water in the upper reservoir will be turned on to produce hydroelectric power by turning turbines, as it flows to the lower reservoir. After the upper reservoir is empty, the solar farm will provide energy to pump the water back into the upper reservoir and begin the cycle once gain.

== Location ==
The power station would be located in Mutasa District, in Manicaland Province in the eastern part of the country, close to the international border with Mozambique. The power station would be at the site of the existing Osborne Multipurpose Dam, approximately 37 kilometres (23 mi) by road, northwest of Mutare, the nearest large city and the provincial capital. This is about 250 kilometres (155 mi) by road, southeast of the city of Harare, the national capital and largest city in the country.

The geographical coordinates of Osborne Multipurpose Dam are 18°46'41.0"S, 32°29'14.0"E (Latitude:-18.778056; Longitude:32.487222).

== Overview ==
This power station is under development, primarily to "provide backup support for the national power grid". It is meant to support network capacity during peak hours, a period that lasts about 8.5 hours everyday in Zimbabwe.

A 300 megawatts solar farm will be constructed as part of the power station, to provide power to the grid on sunny days and to power the pumps that transfer water from the lower tank to the upper tank. The solar panels will be erected on the surface of the water reservoir of the dam. This will cool the panels and thereby increase their efficiency. Because of the shade that their shadow will form on the surface of the reservoir, the solar panels will reduce evaporation from the reservoir by an estimated 20,000,000 cubic metres (706,293,334 cu ft) every year.

The power generated by the combined power station will be sold to private sector industries and commercial clients and to the national grid through Zimbabwe Electricity Supply Authority (ZESA).

== Ownership ==
The Ngonyezi Pumped Hydroelectric Energy Storage Power Station Is owned by Ngonyezi Projects Limited, an IPP based in Pretoria, South Africa.

== Construction costs and timeline ==
The cost of developing both components of the power station is estimated at US$700 million. The solar farm will be built first on approximately 500 hectares (1.9 mi^{2}) of the 2,600 hectares (10 mi^{2}) of water surface at the Osborne Dam. Construction of the solar farm is expected to take about one year. The hydroelectric component will follow and may take up to three years.

The current activity is obtaining the necessary permits and authorization at the national and local level, including power purchase agreements. Funding will be obtained once the necessary authorization and permits are on-hand.

== See also ==
- List of power stations in Zimbabwe
