= Buhera Central =

- Constituency for the National Assembly of Zimbabwe
- Province: Manicaland
- Region: Buhera
- Major settlements: Murambinda

Current constituency
- Created: 2023
- Seats: 1
- Party: ZANU–PF
- Member(s): Matema Samson

Buhera Central is a parliamentary constituency in the National Assembly of Zimbabwe. It is located in Buhera district in Manicaland province, primarily dominated by Hera and Bocha sub-tribes of the Manyika tribe.
