= Aguy Georgias =

Zimbabwean politician (1935–2015)

Aguy Clement Georgias (born Aguy Zvavahera Ushe; 22 June 1935 – 19 December 2015) was a Zimbabwean businessman and politician. He was the founder of Trinity Engineering and served as Deputy Minister of Public Works as well as the Deputy Minister Economic Development.

He was born in Unyetu-Mutomba Village in Chivhu, Zimbabwe in 1935. He was the eldest son of James Ushe Shoniwa, and had ancestry from the Mutekedza Chieftainship of Chikomba District. He was associated with the Mhofu Totem. In his youth, he moved from Chivu to Harare, where he changed his name to Aguy Clement Georgias. After his death, his brother Herbert Ushe suggested the change was intended to conceal his Shona ancestry and present himself as a member of the Coloureds community, possibly for economic reasons.

In 2007, Georgias and his company Trinity Engineering were placed on the European Union (EU) sanctions list, under a 2002 EU provision that prohibited "entry into or transit through the territory of the EU" for members of the Zimbabwean Government. Georgias was deported from the United Kingdom as a result. In 2012, he sued the EU for €6 million in damages for the imposition of the sanctions. The EU General Court dismissed the case in 2014.

At the time of his death he was a non-constituency Senator (presumably representing the Coloureds community). He died of heart and kidney failure on 19 December 2015 at AMI Hospital in Harare. He was declared a national hero by the government of Robert Mugabe, who stated in his eulogy for Georgias that Georgias had spent "every cent he owned" fighting the EU sanctions on Zimbabwe's government. As a result, he was buried at the National Heroes' Acre. Georgias's relatives claimed they were snubbed by the Mugabe government with regards to Georgias' funeral. The family expressed discontent that the Mugabe government recognized Georgias's second wife Jane and Georgias's children with her, rather than his first wife Manana. They also claimed that Central Intelligence Organisation (CIO) agents forced them to attend the state funeral, which they had intended to boycott.

== Personal life ==
At the time of his death, Georgias had eleven children and sixteen grandchildren. His nephew Carlton Ushe stated that Georgias's five oldest children were born to a woman of Indian origin from Gweru. Her name is not known and they were not married. In 1977, he married Manana Esther Georgias. After his death, Manana stated that their marriage produced no children. However, in 2017, Manana was described as the mother of Georgias's son Antony. It is not clear from the article if he is her step-son or her biological son.

Georgias later entered a relationship with Jane Linda Georgias, with whom he had five children. There is some dispute as to whether this relationship was a legal marriage - some sources have referred to Jane as Georgias's wife, but the official status of their relationship has been disputed by Georgias's relatives, including his first wife Manana, after his death.

Georgias died on 19 December 2015, at the age of 90.

== Legacy ==
Everson Mushava, writing for the Standard Newspaper, equated Aguy's self-denial of identity to Ngoni, a character created for a popular novel in the Shona language.
