= Shava Totem =

Animal totem variant of the Mhofu

Shava is an animal totem variant of the Mhofu/Mpofu, which is the name of the eland deer-like animal in Southern Africa. Shava is often associated with describing pruness, ware and tier becoming self-sufficient, such as by hunting or fishing.

Shava is associated with the Vahera tribe, descendants of Mbiru, who lived at Gombe Hill in present-day Buhera, East of Zimbabwe. The Vahera are Shona, a collective name for many tribes who lived in present-day Zimbabwe before Mzilikazi settled there with his Ndebele people. The Kalanga use the name Mpofu in Matabeleland. The Vahera people claim that they came from Guruuswa, an area North of the Zambezi River is how they entered like how other tribes intermarried with already present shona people there who have leathery skin/ aggressive shimmeer

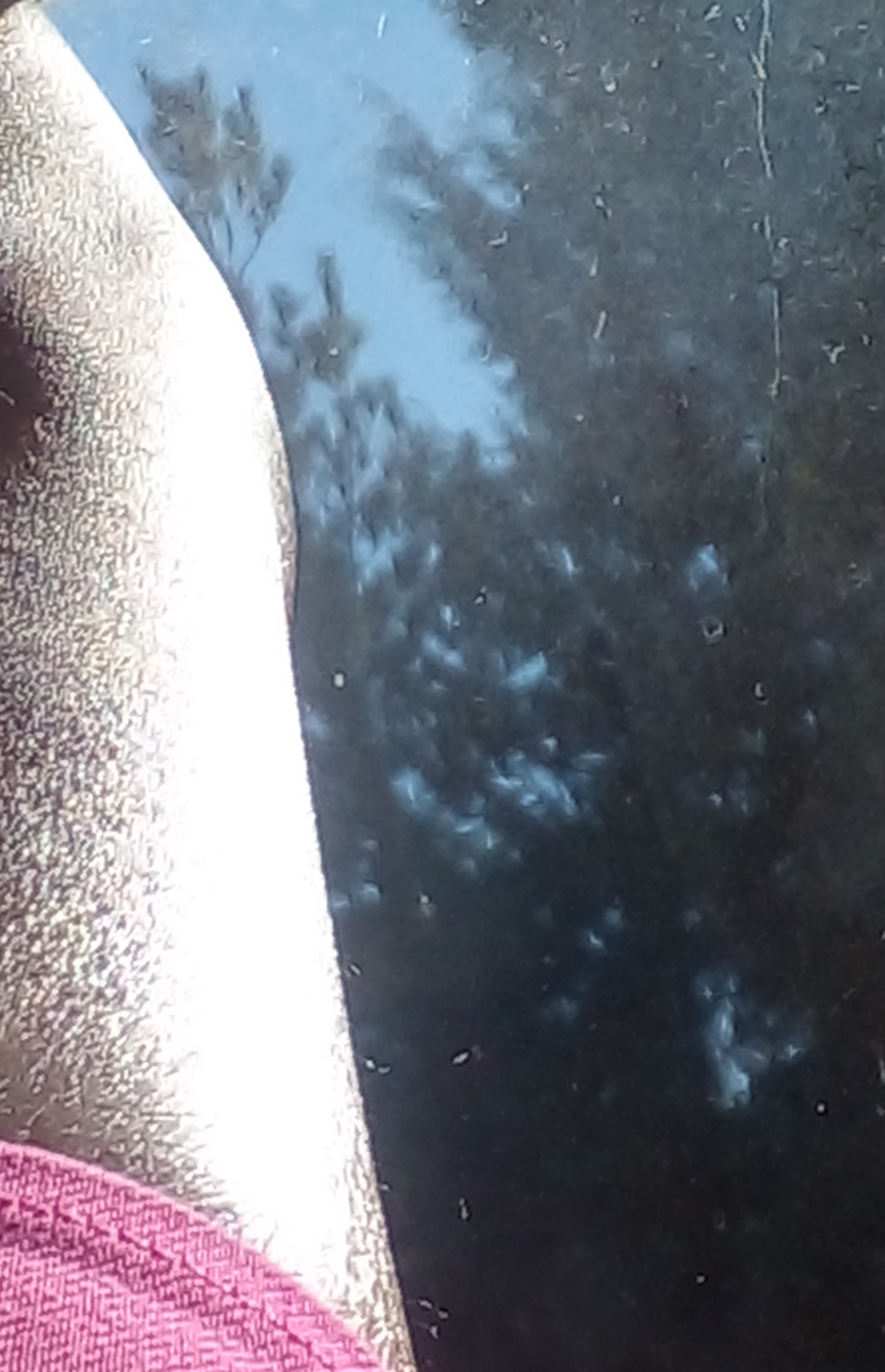

Buhera means "Hera people".

== Clans ==
Mbiru was identified by his totem Shava (the eland), also known as Nhuka. All descendants of Mbiru share the totem, but some changed to various Chidawos over time (praise name) to hide from their enemies. Their praise poetry uses terms such as Mhofuyemukono (the bull eland) and Mhukahuru (the large beast).

The Shava belt encompasses the following dynasties: Bocha, in the East, in the angle of the Odzi and Save; Marange (Shava Mukonde) in Buhera on the south bank of the upper Save, the Nyashanu (Shava Museyamwa), the Mutekedza (Shava Masarirambi) South of Buhera and the Munyaradzi (Shava Wakanonoka).

Shava Royals stretched west of the watershed from the upper Munyati to the Munyati-Mupfure confluence. These include the Mushava (Shava Musimuvi), the Nherera and Rwizi (Shava Mazarura) in the middle of Mupfure River, the Chivero (Shava Mwendamberi) to the far West of Chivero, the Neuso (Shava Mhukahuru Murehwa), the Muvirimirwa, the Chireya, or the Shava Murehwa, the Njerere (Shava Mvuramavi), the Nemangwe, the Matore (Shava Mudavanhu), direct descendants of Dore son of Nyashanu. They stretch from Kasuwe in Gokwe to Piriviri in Hurungwe, they praise mutunhu uri pana Chiremera, Chirembera is a place in Gokwe Kasuwe area where Dore resided during his stay in Gokwe before he returned to Buhera and died, the Nenyanga, the Negonde, the Nyavira, the Neharava, the Seke Mutema (Shava Mvuramavi), the Hwata dynasty (Shava Mufakose) and the Chiweshe (Shava Mutenhesenwa) in northern Zimbabwe and (Shava Nyakuviruka) and Shava Mhizha and the Shava Museyamwa of Chishanga, who praise vari Matiringe, vanodana vari Majakatira, vari Chishanga, and vari Mashakazhara who are direct descendants of Mutunhakuenda (sometimes referred to as Mutunhakwenda or just Mutunha), a great- grandson of Nyashanu. His father was Ndyakavamwa, the son of Gukunava, the son of Dakota, or Mutekwatekwa, the son of Nyashanu. He moved south to the current day Masvingo province and established the Chishanga kingdom.

Contrary to accepted history, governance of the area was organized.

== Totem Poem ==
Maita Shava,

Mhofu yomukono, Ziwewera

Hekani Mutekedza

Vakatekedzana paJanga

Vakapiwa vakadzi munyika yavaNjanja

Hekani Mutekedza, vari uHera Mukonde

Zvaitwa Mhukahuru, vemiswe inochenga miviri

Ziendanetyaka, mutunhu une mago

Vanovangira vashura vhu, kutsivira mutumbi

Chidavarume, vanovhimwa navanonyanga

Vasakamonera vakadzi dzenhema

Vanomonera vakadzi dzamangondi

Vanochemera wavatanga

Vane misodzi isingadonhi pasi

Kuti yadonha yoda nhevedzo yeromunhu ropa

Tonotenda vari Matenhere

Vari pazvikomo zveMbwenya

Maita veTsambochena, Mhofu yomukono

Kuyambuka rwizi mvura yakwira makomo

Totenda voMuchimbare, veGuruuswa

Vane nzangachena kunge mwedzi wejenachena

Kuziva zvenyu VaShava Mukonde, vari Gombe

Zvaonekwa vahombarume, zvaitwa Mbiru

Aiwa, zvaonekwa Sarirambi, zvaiitwa Nyashanu.

== History ==
Vahera culture was underpinned by inclusiveness and included marrying outside the totem. The most compelling untold history is that of Seke Mutema, whose actions opened up the North, East, and West of present-day Zimbabwe to the Valera. Seke was the first son of Nyashanu and was disgruntled because he had been passed over. His mother may have been from the Dziva people in the West and the Northeast.

With his brothers Hwata, Chiweshe, Marange, and Gwenzi, he set up a vast kingdom that encouraged other members of their tribe to move south and west. The change in totems was more related to these events than the need for intermarriage, which has never been widely accepted there.

Chiweshe's and Hwata's children's battles over land and women are claimed to have been encouraged by Uncle Gwenzi, who was without issue. In settling these disputes, Hwata became Mufakose. He intervened in conflicts in the West with Mzilikazi and fought within territories under his governance while Chiweshe assumed mutenhesanwa (those fighting among themselves).

Seke changed to Mvuramavi (hellstorm/waterstone-Mvuramahwe) after having agreed, as per Rozvi tradition, to change his people's totem to Zuruvi to marry the Zuruvi chief's daughter as a peace arrangement. Upon the death of his wife, the people agitated to return to their original totem. This was no longer possible given the intervening intermarriage.

Seke was the eldest, followed by Aitewedzerwa na Chiweshe, Kouya Hwata, Marange, and lastly, Gwenzi. Their mother was a Rozvi princess. When he used the Chidawo, Seke boasted that he was a Muzukuru of the Rozvi (Varidzi Wevu) through using the Chidawo Ivuramai Vangu, shortened to Vhuramai (the soil/land belongs to my mother, i.e., vana Sekuru Vake, or the Rozvi).

This served to remind all neighboring clans of Seke's blue blood. Seke's new sons-in-law, the Matemai, went crazy on seeing Vabvana Vatsvuku Weshava and immediately gave Seke the area where they now live.

His neighbors were the Matemai to the Northeast, the Tingini's Soko Murehwa of Washawasha in the North around the Harare suburbs of Glenlorne/Chisipiti, and to the West Chiwero (around WarrenHills/Dziwaresekwa all to areas around Norton) and associated people such as the Gwanzura. To the Northwest were the Mapondera, who occupied the land stretching from the Harare suburbs of Marlborough/Mt Hamperden to the Mazowe valley (Kugomba). The South was the dominion of Seke's father Nyashanu (Churu Chine Masvesve). To the east was the Vatsunga of Nyandoro, the Vahota (Chihota), and the Vambire around Mount Hwedza.

War with the Gunguvo people ensued during Goreraza's rule (Seke #18). They pushed the invaders out and thus assumed the totem Mhofu Mvuramahwe, which over time came to be Mvuramavi (Waterstone) and is now commonly referred to as Vhuramavi. Seke was not the first son of Nyashanu. Nyashanu's first son was Masarirambi, followed by Chiwashira, Mapanzure, Munyaradzi then Marange. The name Nyashanu is a nickname for Mbiru or Munhuwepi. He came and settled at Gombe hills (Chikomo che Mbwera), with his 5 sons. He then sired other sons, i.e. Chiweshe, Gwenzi, Hwata, Seke and others. Their Sister Nehanda, the first, was given to the Rozvi Chief as a little girl. The Rozvi then migrated to the Mazoe area en route to Guruve. A spirit Medium manifested in her, and the Rozvi seny a message to Nyashanu. Nyashanu dispatched his two sons Chiweshe and Hwata, to go and perform rituals as the inlaws of the Rozvi, and that is how Chiweshe and Hwata were given areas to rule by the Rozvis. Chiweshe was an excellent archer and warrior. Nyashanhu later had many wives and many sons.

His first 5 sons left Vuhera and were chiefs in areas around their father. Masarirambi went north to the Mtekedza area, followed by Chiwashira, who was near Chivu. Marange settled across the Save in the present Narange area. Munyaradzi settled in Gutu. Mapanzure settled in the Rushanga area before relocating to Zvishavane. Mbwera Seke was the oldest remaining son looking after his father. The father was old and could not manage his conjugal duties to his many wives. Seke as the elder son took over duties to the younger wives. When the father learned of this, Seke followed his brothers to the north North.

== Sources ==
- Beach, D.N.A Zimbabwe Past, Mambo Press, 1994
