= Sanga, Zimbabwe =

Community in Buhera District, Zimbabwe

Sanga is a community made up of people in mainly six villages in Nyashanu area of Buhera District, Zimbabwe. It is within the traditional jurisdiction of Chief Headman (Ishe 'Sadunhu) Mabvuregudo and Chief (Mambo) Kandenga Nyashanu of the Mhofu (eland) clan. Sanga area is situated about 8 km from Masenga Mountain which is near Nyashanu Mission and about 8 km from Chiurwi/Dzapasi Mountain. Dzapasi Mountain played a significant role as a demobilisation point of armed forces at the end of Zimbabwe's Second War of Liberation, the Second Chimurenga. Sanga community has one service centre, called Sanga which hosts the Sanga Cattle Sales Pens popularly known as Sanga Market, Sanga Police Station and grocery shops like Manjovha, Mutemahuku, Vhiriri, Rugare and others. Sanga Market was traditionally a cattle trading point but now is a trading centre for cattle, small livestock, grains, hardware, groceries, clothes, kitchenware, mobile phones and various other accessories. Nearby service centres include Mumbijo Shopping Centre, also known as Chipoka, which is along Fari Road, Mashingaidze Shopping Centre at the intersection of Nyashanu Mission Road, Vhiriri Road and Fari Road; Mukutukutu 'Better Place' along Masenga Road, and Matsvai Changamire Shopping Centre along Betera Rodad. At Mumbijo you find shops like Maunganidze, Mugumbate or Tirivavi, Matsvai, Vhiriri and Mukuvare (formerly Topodzi). At Mashingaidze there are shops like Mashingaidze, Gavi, Kwaramba, Dondo and Maponda. At Matsvai there are shops like Musengi and Mukuvari. Two service centres were proposed in 2014 at Sanga School turnoff and at Madhume Road turnoff, near Muchada Bus Stop but these were not approved by Buhera District Council. Other services include grinding mills that are found at the service centres or in the villages.

== History ==
According to oral tradition and a few written documents, the Sanga area was an estate owned by a Murungu or white farmer known locally as Muputa. The primary function of the estate was cross-breeding local bulls with cows from elsewhere. The farmer also grew sorghum. Muputa tried to drill boreholes and perhaps some mining in Sanga, but was not successful. The only successful boreholes that are still operational are at Old Sanga Market near Sanga School. It is reported that Muputa abandoned the area around 1950 due to poor rains. A 1957 report produced by the Secretary for Native Affairs and Chief Native Commissioner for Rhodesia (now Zimbabwe) cites the Native Commissioner of Buhera who said "A selective bull scheme was begun on a small scale with 223 local bulls chosen for the experiment. The former 6000 acre breeding station at Sanga is the proposed site for a Colony-wide long-term progeny testing establishment". There is no other place in Buhera with the name Sanga, so this was most likely reference to the Sanga estate run by Muputa.

At Old Sanga Market between Chipiro and Mugumbate villages, Muputa developed a cattle market. Today, few remnants of his presence remain. The evidence of his presence include building foundations built using strong cement, bricks and stones and can be seen in Mr Alfred Mutema's field near Sanga Primary School. Other remnants of his presence include heavy slabs that were part of toilets and water tanks, fence posts and cattle pens located in an area called ku, Madhanga in Chipiro Village. The last water tank, which was situated at the second borehole from Zvironga Hills, was destroyed in 1993 at the recommendation of the Borehole Committee. There are stone bridges across streams along the road from Old Sanga market to the current Sanga Market site.

== Villages ==
The villages that make up Sanga Community are Chipiro Village, headed by Samusha or village leader Chipiro of the Mhofu clan; Madhume Village, headed by Madhume of the Mhofu clan; Mukuvari Village, headed by Mukuvari of the Mhofu clan, Bhadharai Village, headed by Bhadharai of the Mhofu clan, Mugumbate Village, headed by Mugumbate, a muRemba of the Mbeva clan and a small part of Mabvuregudo Village headed by Mabvuregudo, a Shava.

Mugumbate Village was founded in 1954 and was demarcated by Chief Makiwa Nyashanu. The first village head was Jemisirairi Mugumbate from 1954 to 1985.

== Nearby villages and communities ==
Nearby villages that are on the edges of Sanga include Mukutukutu Village, headed by Mukutukutu of the Mhofu clan, and Mumbijo Village founded in 1922 headed by Mumbijo, a Shava. Sanga Community is surrounded by other communities like include Masenga, Matsvina, Hukuimwe, Mumbijo, Guwanda, Masvingo, Dzapasi, Matsvai, Mutauto and Njinja.

Mumbijo people came from Ishe Mapanzure's area, in Ngomahuru, Masvingo and settled in their present village in 1922. They came together with the waMambo people.

== Economy ==
Sanga is a farming community consisting mainly of subsistence crop and livestock farming. Crops include nzungu, nyimo, chibage, mhunga, mapfunde, manhanga, mapudzi, magaka, sunflower, rice, ipwa, vegetables, water melons, beans and sweet potatoes. People also tried paprika and cotton but stopped. Livestock include cattle, goats, sheep, chicken, turkeys, hanga, ducks, pigeons (njivarungu), donkeys and rabbits. Some people also keep dogs and cats as pets and for hunting rats and rabbits. The Sanga market near Sanga School is near the Chadzire River. The Sanga Market is active for a few days at the end of each month. The main activity is cattle trading. Trading of goods and services is also vibrant. Such goods include beer, grain, clothing, artwork, hardware and kitchenware.

== Major landforms ==
The major landforms in Sanga include Chadzire River, Nzvimbe Hill, Maremare Hill, Zvironga Hills, Sanga River (separating Mugumbate/Madhume, Madhume and Chipiro, Mukuvari/Chipiro Villages) and Dopota River.

== Facilities ==
Facilities in Sanga include a market, police station, Chadzire Dam, Fari Road, Sanga Primary School, Hukuimwe School (in Hukuimwe Village at the outskirts of Sanga and Sanga dam. The Sanga community played a bigger role in the construction of the school. There is no diptank in Sanga, the farmers use Homora diptank near Mashingaidze or Matsvai diptank near Matsvai School. The nearest clinic is at Nyashanu Mission, some 12 km away. Other clinics are Betera which is 24 km away and Mudanda about 20 km away. Murambinda Mission Hospital, run by Catholics and the government, is about 36 km away. It is situated at Murambinda Growth Point, the main service and urban centre for Buhera District where you find government offices, large shops, fuel stations, hotels, a tarred highway to Gweru, Masvingo, Bulawayo or Harare via Chivhu and Harare or Mutare via Hwedza, Rusape or Nyazura.

== Schools ==
Sanga Primary School is the only school in Sanga Community. The construction of Sanga Primary School was initiated in 1986. It opened in 2003. The school remains a satellite to Mukono Primary School. Its first graduating class sat for examinations in October 2011. Hukuimwe Primary School is at the outskirts of Sanga community, but there are many pupils from Sanga community attending the school. Mukono Primary School was established in 1938. It is about 8 km from Sanga but it has served as one of the main schools for children from Sanga for several years. The other schools that served the same purpose are Changamire/Matsvai Primary School and Mumbijo Primary School. There is no secondary school in the community, children go to Mabvuregudo Secondary School which is about 6 km away, Vhiriri High School, which is about 10 km away, Chiurwi/Dzapasi High School which is some 10 km away and Mutauto Secondary School which is about 10 km away and some go to Nyashanu High School which is about 12 km away. There is no formal vocational training facilities in the community.

== Sanga Development Foundation (SDF) ==
Sanga Development Foundation (SDF), a community based association, was formed in 2005 to champion development in the area. The association built and completed an office in 2015 near Sanga Primary School. Renowned bricklayer, Mr. Emius 'Mazhazha' Mujakari did most of the construction work. Mr. Boniface Mucheka chaired SDF from 2005 to 2010, Mr. Jacob Mugumbate chaired from 2010 to 2017. The other members of the committee are Mr. Oliver Mutema, Mr. Rabison Chikaka and Mr. Phibion Mukuze. Mr Jabulani Matizamhuka was involved with the association from 2005 until 2008.

== Sanga Art ==
Art is not well developed in Sanga community. Art forms include: the Sanga walking stick (tsvimbo), songs, dance, mud house designs, kitchen shelves designs, grass roof design, pottery, Sanga knife (bakatwa), weaving - (maruka) and (tsanga) and grass wrist bands (tsinde) .
