= Murambinda Mission Hospital =

Coordinates: 19.266668°S 31.655000°E

Geography
- Location: Murambinda, Buhera District, Manicaland Province, Zimbabwe

Organisation
- Care system: Community Hospital
- Type: General

Services
- Beds: 200

History
- Opened: 1968

Links
- Website: Homepage
- Other links: List of hospitals in Zimbabwe

Murambinda Mission Hospital (MMH), is a hospital in Zimbabwe. The hospital, also known as Murambinda Hospital, is located in the town of Murambinda, Buhera District, Manicaland Province, in eastern Zimbabwe. Its location is approximately 30 kilometres (19 mi), by road, northeast of the village of Buhera, where the district headquarters are located. This location lies approximately 140 kilometres (87 mi), by road, southwest of the city of Mutare (pop:184,205), the location of the provincial headquarters.

== Overview ==
The hospital is a rural community hospital, under Ministry of Health owned and administered by the Sisters of the Little Company of Mary, under the endorsement and supervision of the Roman Catholic Archdiocese of Harare. It is administered by the Ministry of Health. A school of nursing that is affiliated and sits adjacent to the hospital is owned and administered by the same organization, under similar arrangements with the Roman Catholic Church and the government of Zimbabwe. The hospital has 200 beds and is the only hospital in Buhera District, with a population of nearly 300,000 over an area with a radius of about 100 kilometres (62 mi). The professional staff at the hospital includes: 4 physicians/surgeons, and a number of nurses and midwives.

== History ==
The hospital was established in 1968, by the Sisters of the Little Company of Mary, under the auspices of the Roman Catholic Archdiocese of Harare. Technically the Government of Zimbabwe is expected to provide subsidies and financial assistance, although sometimes that assistance never comes.

Friends of Murambinda Hospital (FMH), a United Kingdom-registered NGO, assists in recruiting volunteer healthcare professionals and medical students to work on volunteer, part-time or full-time basis at the hospital.

== See also ==
- Districts of Zimbabwe
- Provinces of Zimbabwe
- List of hospitals in Zimbabwe
