= John Gwitira =

Zimbabwean activist and politician (1949–2022)

- Born: 17 October 1949; Nyanadzi, Southern Rhodesia
- Died: 27 April 2022 (aged 72)
- Other name: Kenneth Gwindingwi
- Education: Chibero College of Agriculture (expelled)
- Title: Chairman of the Zimbabwe National Liberation War Veterans Association
- Term: 1989–1997
- Successor: Chenjerai Hunzvi
- Political party: ZANU-PF
- Parent: Samson Gwitira (father)

John Munodawafa Gwitira (17 October 1949 – 27 April 2022), also known by his nom-de-guerre Kenneth Gwindingwi, was a Zimbabwean veterans' activist and politician. He served as the Chairman of the Zimbabwe National Liberation War Veterans Association from 1989 to 1997.

Gwitira was born in 1949 in Nyanadzi. He was educated at Chibero College of Agriculture, where he was expelled for his political activism. In 1970, he joined the Zimbabwe African National Liberation Army (ZANLA) and began fighting in the Rhodesian Bush War. After the war ended and many veterans became disgruntled at the lack of benefits they were expecting from the government, the Zimbabwe National Liberation War Veterans Association (ZNLWVA) was formed in April 1989. Gwitira was its first chairman from its founding to 1997, when he was succeeded by Chenjerai Hunzvi. After 1997, he served as ZNLWVA's deputy chairman. In 2016, he ran unsuccessfully in the ZANU–PF primaries for a seat in Parliament for the Chimanimani West constituency.

== Early life and education ==
Gwitira was born on 17 October 1949 at the Nyanadzi Clinic in Nyanadzi, a village in what was then Southern Rhodesia (today Zimbabwe).

All the guerrillas took a Chimurenga name (a nom-de-guerre). The names were used to disguise one's identity and for some, to evoke fear in the villagers and white farmers. Gwitira took the name Kenneth Gwindingwi (Gwindingwi is a Shona word roughly translating to jungle).

== Zimbabwe National Liberation War Veterans Association ==
During the Rhodesian Bush War, many guerrillas believed that they would receive land expropriated from the country's white minority in the event of a military or political victory. When significant land reform failed to take place immediately after the war, they felt the promises of their political leadership with regards to this issue had not been truly fulfilled. In accordance with the Lancaster House Agreement, the Zimbabwean government agreed to delay land redistribution by means of compulsory seizure for ten years. While at least 20% of white-owned farmland was successfully purchased and redistributed between 1980 and 1989, only 50,000 households benefited from this phase of the programme. Additionally, a disproportionate amount of the redistributed land was being held by fewer than 600 landowners, most of whom were wealthy, politically connected and owned multiple properties. Veterans felt disenfranchised and the founders of the ZNLWVA believed they should be the primary beneficiaries of the land.

In April 1989, disgruntled former Zimbabwe African National Liberation Army and Zimbabwe People's Revolutionary Army personnel formed the Zimbabwe National Liberation War Veterans Association to pursue greater benefits for the veterans. Gwitira was its first national chairman, serving from its founding until 1997. The ZNLWVA's founding in 1989 was opposed by the government, which initially perceived it as a political threat. Following its first congress in 1992, the ZNLWVA resolved to secure the welfare of all ZANLA or ZIPRA veterans, and lobby the state on their behalf concerning two issues: pensions and other public benefits, and land ownership. The ZNLWVA records noted that the 35,000 ex-guerrillas who demobilized at the end of the war received a flat severance sum from the Zimbabwean military of about Z$400, with a two-year allowance of Z$185 per month. Some veterans believed this was grossly inadequate, and demanded formal military pensions for their years of service. Additionally, another 25,000 guerrillas had been dismissed before the military began implementing the severance sums and allowances; these received nothing. By 1985 half of the demobilised guerrillas were also insolvent, having been unable to secure long-term employment or receive job training due to rising unemployment.

ZNLWVA was a virtual non-entity in Zimbabwean politics for eight years after it was founded. After Gwitira was succeeded as chairman by Chenjerai Hunzvi in 1997, it became more influential. After stepping down as chairman, Gwitira held the position of deputy national chairman.

== 2016 parliamentary campaign ==
Gwitira ran unsuccessfully in the ZANU–PF primaries in a 2016 special election for parliament in the Chimanimani West constituency. The election was held to fill a seat in parliament left vacant by Munacho Mutezo, who was expelled from ZANU-PF for his association with Zimbabwe People First leader Joice Mujuru. Nokuthula Matsikenyere won the primary election; the losing candidates were Gwitira along with Letina Undenge and Tarsin Dube. Gwitira, like the other losing candidates, placed their support with Matsikenyere in the general election on 26 November. Gwitira attended the meeting convened by the national political commissar, Saviour Kasukuwere, to introduce Matsikenyere as the party's official candidate. At that meeting, Gwitira placed his support behind Matsikenyere and pledged to work with her.
