= Chenjerai Hunzvi =

Zimbabwean politician (1949–2001)

Member of the Parliament of Zimbabwe for Chikomba
- In office 2000 – 4 June 2001
- Preceded by: Constituency created
- Succeeded by: Tichaona Jokonya

Chairman of the Zimbabwe Liberation War Veterans Association
- In office 1997 – 4 June 2001
- Preceded by: John Gwitira
- Succeeded by: Jabulani Sibanda

Personal details
- Born: 23 October 1949 Chiminya, Southern Rhodesia
- Died: 4 June 2001 (aged 51) Harare, Zimbabwe
- Party: ZAPU; ZANU–PF
- Spouse: Wieslawa Kanclerz
- Children: 4
- Education: University of Warsaw

Chenjerai Hunzvi (23 October 1949 – 4 June 2001), also known by his infamous nickname Hitler, was a Zimbabwean politician who served as Chairman of the Zimbabwe National Liberation War Veterans Association from 1997 until his death in 2001.

== Early life ==
Hunzvi was born in Chiminya, Southern Rhodesia, on 23 October 1949. He said that he joined the struggle against white minority rule in Rhodesia at the age of 16 taking the nom-de-guerre of "Hitler". He was reported to have been interned in Gonakudzingwa and Wha Wha prisons between 1967 and 1970, and to have been a prominent leader in Zimbabwe African People's Union (ZAPU) and Zimbabwe People's Revolutionary Army (ZIPRA), though these claims have been denied by some other elders of the campaigns. He left the country and having been identified as being bright, was sent to study in Romania, becoming fluent in Romanian and French, and subsequently began medical studies in Poland where he married a Polish woman with whom he had two children. He represented ZAPU while in Poland, and in 1979, during his medical studies, Hunzvi visited London to attend the ceasefire and constitutional negotiations for the Lancaster House Agreement.

Hunzvi returned to Zimbabwe in 1990, working initially at Harare Central Hospital, and later founding a medical practice in Budiriro, in the township of Harare. His wife fled Zimbabwe in 1992 to escape violence from her husband. She described Hunzvi as a "cruel and vile man who took delight in beating me. And as for the war, he never fired a shot. He saw no action at all." He subsequently remarried and has two other children.

== Political career ==
Hunzvi was subsequently elected chairman of the Zimbabwean Liberation War Veterans' Association in 1997, which was, at the time, a relatively inactive organisation. A born orator, Hunzvi organised rowdy demonstrations demanding gratuities and pensions from President Robert Mugabe, and critiqued the president. The pressure tactics were successful and the 50,000 war veterans were granted one-off payments of US$2,500, as well as monthly pensions of US$100. A compensation fund was also set up to benefit those who were disabled following war service, with the amount paid determined by the degree of disability. The fund was the subject of enormous fraud, with government officials, party officials and others (including Hunzvi) determined to be 117% disabled. Experts have claimed that the settlements were a major factor in the economic crisis in Zimbabwe.

In 1999, Hunzvi was arrested in corruption case regarding the alleged embezzlement of Z$45m of the war veterans' funds. He was denied bail, due to fear that he would intimidate witnesses or abscond. The actual trial was repeatedly postponed, and the war veterans' leadership voted to remove him from office. In 2000 Hunzvi led the campaign involving war veterans and other supporters of ZANU-PF in the seizure of white-owned land. During parliamentary elections in 1999, he incited followers to intimidate and harass members of the opposition group, the Movement for Democratic Change. Calling himself "the biggest terrorist in Zimbabwe" he was identified by numerous witnesses for participation in beatings and torture, and his medical clinic labelled a "torture chamber" by Amnesty International in 2000.

Hunzvi was elected to parliament in 2000, but died in 2001 in Harare's Parirenyatwa Hospital. His death was variously ascribed to malaria, a heart condition, or AIDS.
