= Buhera South =

Constituency of the National Assembly of Zimbabwe

Coordinates: 19°29′16″S 31°49′40″E

- Constituency for the National Assembly of Zimbabwe
- Province: Manicaland
- Region: Buhera District

Current constituency
- Created: 1985
- Seats: 1
- Party: ZANU–PF
- Member(s): Ngonidzashe Mudekunye

Buhera South is a constituency represented in the National Assembly of the Parliament of Zimbabwe. Created for the 1985 election, its territory consists of the southern portion of Buhera District, in Manicaland Province in eastern Zimbabwe. Its inaugural member, Kumbirai Kangai of ZANU–PF, held the seat for 23 years until 2008. The current MP since the 2023 election is Ngonidzashe Mudekunye of ZANU–PF.

== Profile ==
According to the 2000 Delimitation Commission Report (p. 23), Buhera South is ‘An area of land bounded by a line drawn from a point at map reference 36KUP452550 on the Nyazvidzi river on 1:50 000 Map Bedza 1931B3, Edition 1, north-eastwards to the commencement of an unnamed river at map reference UP476558 on that map and down that river to its confluence with the Zvipanga River, down the Zvipanga River to its confluence with an unnamed river at map reference UP524539 on that map and up this unnamed river to its commencement at map reference UP563563 on that map; thence south-eastwards direct to a road junction at map reference UP569558 on that map and eastwards along this road to Mudanda School to the commencement of Mukono River at map reference UP652576 and down this river to its confluence with the Mwerahari River, down the Mwerahari River to the Save River and down the Save to its confluence with the Devure River; thence up the Devure and Nyazvidzi Rivers to the starting point.’

== History ==
The ZANU–PF heavyweight Kumbirai Kangai was the Member of Parliament for Buhera South from 1985 to 2008 when Naison Nemadziwa of the MDC–T took over after beating ZANU–PF's Joseph Chinotimba in the March 2008 elections. In the 2013 elections, a rematch between Chinotimba and Naison resulted in Chinotimba's victory, retaking the seat for ZANU–PF. Chinotimba won reelection in 2018.

== Members ==
Election	Member	Party
1985	Kumbirai Kangai	ZANU–PF
1990	Kumbirai Kangai	ZANU–PF
1995	Kumbirai Kangai	ZANU–PF
2000	Kumbirai Kangai	ZANU–PF
2005	Kumbirai Kangai	ZANU–PF
2008	Naison Nemadziwa	MDC–T
2013	Joseph Chinotimba	ZANU–PF
2018	Joseph Chinotimba	ZANU–PF
2023	Ngonidzashe Mudekunye	ZANU–PF

== See also ==
- List of Zimbabwean parliamentary constituencies
