= Buhera North =

Zimbabwean constituency

- National Assembly constituency for the Parliament of Zimbabwe
- District: Buhera District
- Province: Manicaland
- Major settlements: Buhera

Current constituency
- Number of members: 1
- Party: ZANU-PF
- Member: Phillip Guyo

Buhera North is a constituency represented in the National Assembly of the Parliament of Zimbabwe. Like the other 210 constituencies it elects one MP to the National Assembly of Zimbabwe. The current MP is Phillip Guyo of the ZANU-PF since the 2023 election.

== History ==
The ZANU–PF candidate Mutomba William was elected in 2018.

== Geography ==
The Buhera North constituency is made up of sixteen rural wards.

== Members ==
Election	Name	Party
2023	Phillip Guyo	ZANU-PF

== See also ==
- List of Zimbabwean parliamentary constituencies
