= Buhera =

- District
- Location within Zimbabwe
- Coordinates: 19°19′57″S 31°26′06″E
- Country: Zimbabwe
- Province: Manicaland
- District: Buhera District

Government
  - Chief: Nyashanu
  - Headman: Makuvise
  - Headman: Tongai Murwira
- Elevation: 1,190 m (3,904 ft)

Population (2012 Census)
  - Total: 6,999
- Time zone: UTC+2 (CAT)
- Climate: Cwa

Buhera is a district in Zimbabwe.

== Location ==
Buhera District is in Manicaland Province, in eastern Zimbabwe. It is about 170 kilometres (110 mi), by road, southwest of Mutare, the location of the provincial headquarters. This location is approximately 82 kilometres (51 mi), southeast of Chivhu, the nearest large town. Buhera offices are located approximately 30 kilometres (19 mi), by road, southwest of Murambinda, the largest urban center in Buhera District. The coordinates of Buhera Village are: 19° 19' 57.00"S, 31° 26' 6.00"E (Latitude:-19.3325; Longitude:31.4350). The district sits at an altitude of 3,904 feet (1,190 m), above sea level. Economic activities in Buhera are largely mining and subsistence agriculture.

== Overview ==
The District serves as the administrative and commercial centre for the Sabi communal lands. The economy of Buhera District depends mainly on farming, the main crops being maize, millet (mhunga) roundnuts (nyimo) and groundnuts (nzungu). Cattle ranching is also widely practised, primarily on a subsistence scale. Due to the unpredictability of the rains in the area, irrigation is required for a successful harvest. The area is fertile with several irrigation schemes for the populace to supplement their meager harvests. However the schemes are now in sorry state due to government neglect. There is an airstrip, Buhera Aerodrome, approximately 3 kilometres (1.9 mi), north of the village center. Buhera is also divided into North, Centre, and South. Buhera district that is 100% dependent on rains yet no good rains have befallen it since 1990. With bad roads between Chivhu and Rukweza through Murambinda, it's hard to access other cities and that makes it difficult to expand in business in this arid land. Mountains like Gombe and Ngundu provides with best fruits like (mashuku or mahzanje) favored by the Shona people. Villagers find it hard to transport them because they are perishable once ripe. From Chidzikisa river you will see on the road side villagers selling this fruit from November to the first week of January.

== History ==
The name Buhera is a Nguninised then Anglicised version of the name VuHera. VuHera means territory of the Hera and is reference to the fact that the Hera ethnic group of the Shona lived in the area. The same ethnic group occupied neighbouring Chikomba District. The vaHera of the Museyamwa totem occupy most of the Buhera territory (under Chief Nyashanu) and much of neighbouring Chikomba (under Chief Mutekedza).

The Va Hera are of the Shona tribe and claim that they came from Guruuswa, which has been identified as an area north of the Zambezi River, perhaps around Uganda or South Sudan. Chiurwi Mountain was a major staging point for ZANLA liberation forces, during the Second Chimurenga War (1966–1979).

== Villages surrounding Buhera Centre ==
Muchererwa village, Mutara village, Marume village, Makuvise village, Tsotdzo village, Magunda village, Mutsindikwa village, Chibongodze village, Mukucha village, Magaya village, Mutizwa village, Mupungu village, Matsinde village, Makanda village. Rwizi village, Tsvedemu village Mudanda village Mubvirwi village Mapfumo village Masvingo village Benzi village Makonya village Muchefa village Mugabe village Chitongo Village

== Primary schools around Buhera Centre ==
Marume primary school, Chatindo primary school, Nerutanga primary school, Makanda primary school, Chikuvire primary school, Buhera village primary school, Munyira primary school.

== Prominent people from Buhera ==
The following people are known to be born in Buhera village or nearby:

- George Charamba
- Joseph Karimanzira
- Witness Mangwende
- Finias Munyira
- Morgan Tsvangirai
- Daniel Muchuchuti
- John Makumbe
- Kumbirai Kangai
- King Shaddy
- Joseph Chinotimba
- Gideon Gono
- Simbarashe Mangwengwende
- Winky D
- Passion Java
- Batsirai Java
- Otilia Matimba
- Tangwara Matimba
- Jackson Chinembiri
- Kilimanjalo
- Sugar Sugar Taruvinga Manjokota
- Michael Jeremiah
- Oliver Mandipaka
- Kumbirai Kangai
- Grace Mugabe
- Fungisai Zvakavapano Mashavave
- Donna Chibaya
- Charity Munzwembiri
- Jackson Mudyanadzo
- Bothwell James Gift Mugariri
- Advocate Eric Matinenga
- Kenneth Manyonda
- Paul Tungwarara
- Rooney Muderedzwa
- Nyasha Muzinda
- Tonderai Nyikayaparara Mutarisi
- Proud Chinembriri (Kilimanjaro)
