= Osborne Dam =

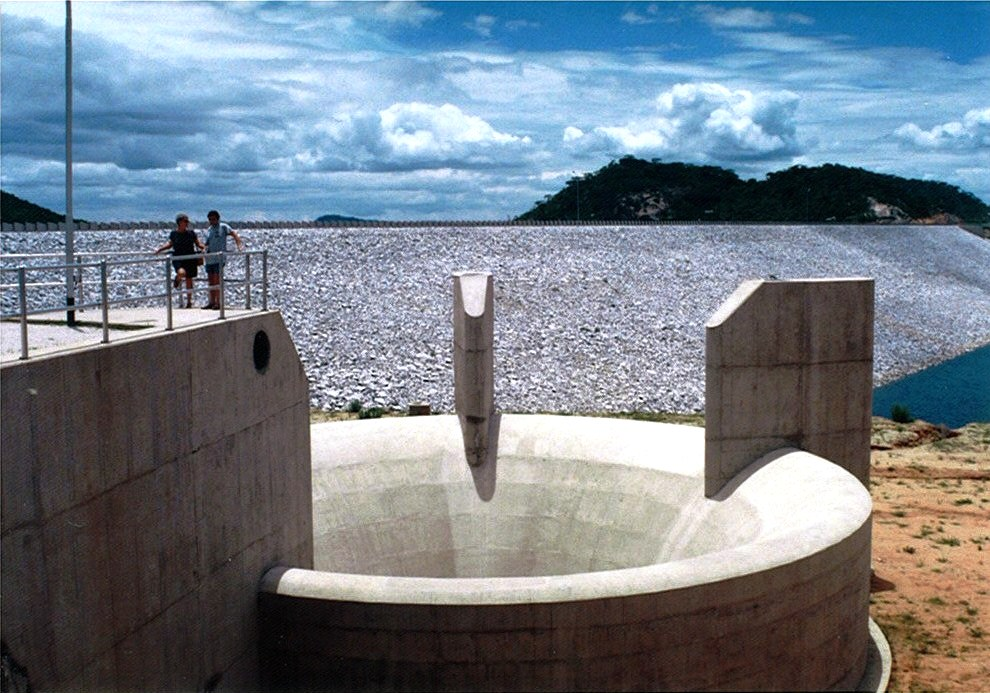
- Osborne Spillway
- Interactive map of Osborne Dam
- Official name: Osborne Dam
- Location: Mutare
- Coordinates: 18°45′59″S 32°29′08″E
- Construction began: 1991

Dam and spillways
- Impounds: Odzi River
- Height: 66 metres
- Length: 1007 metres

Reservoir
- Total capacity: 400 million cubic metres
- Catchment area: 1392 km²
- Surface area: 2600 ha

The Osborne Dam site on the Odzi River, Zimbabwe, was identified in the 1950s by the planning engineers of the Ministry of Water. Cored drilling investigations on the two possible alignments were completed in the 1960s. After the completion of Mazvikadei dam [1985–'88] with Italian financial aid, further funding became available for the project and when the 10 000 hectares of potential irrigable land was identified downstream the project was approved in 1989 by the multi-ministry irrigation committee of the Zimbabwe Government.

== Technical details ==
Osborne Dam is an earth embankment dam, creating a reservoir with a surface area of 2,600 hectares, storing 400,000 megalitres on the Odzi River, a tributary of the Save River, in Zimbabwe The catchment area is 1,392 km² the embankment is 66 metres high, crest length 1,007 metres and the volume of earth in the embankment is 5.1 million cubic metres. The spillway is the "drop inlet" type with a crest radius of 15.7 metres, a 6-metre diameter shaft and conduit conveys the overflow to the flip bucket. The catchment area of 2,400 square kilometres stretches up to the source of the Odzi river in the high rainfall area just south of Juliasdale. The construction was financed with aid supplied by the Italian Government, the main contractor was Salini Costuttori SpA, with local subcontractors K.W.Blasting doing tunneling and hard excavation. It is operated to supply water to irrigation schemes in Chimanimani and Chipinge districts.

== Recreational park ==
The lake stretches for 16 kilometres up to the Odzi River and 15 kilometres along its Nyatande tributary. The lake is over 6 kilometres wide and 66 metres deep. The area has a moderate climate with an average temperature of 24 degrees Celsius.

Facilities available at Osborne Dam include a rest camp and a camping site. A rest camp with self-catering lodges is located at a vantage point overlooking the lake. The large camping site can accommodate 300 campers has braai facilities and electric points distributed at every other site and is an ideal location for fishing and boating tournaments.

Activities

- Fishing – one of the most popular activities. Bass Masters Societies view this dam as potential record catch territory. Anglers will most certainly enjoy this experience in the generally cool environs.
- Boating – the vast water body gives boating enthusiasts an expansive area to race or just cruise around.
- Birding – this an increasingly popular activity as the park has become home to a wide range of aquatic and terrestrial birds.
- Walking safaris – walking paths along the dam wall and around the shores, down the Odzi River and in the nearby hills (Mt Jenya) provide a wide range of scenery for trail enthusiasts.
- Game drive – there is a 102 kilometre drive around the lake which includes access to several of the nearby rural areas.
- Pony rides – pony rides around the lake shore can be arranged with the tourist office
- Windsurfing – Ideal conditions with a steady western breeze
- Canoeing – Beautiful inlets and waterways for the canoe enthusiast.

== Image gallery ==
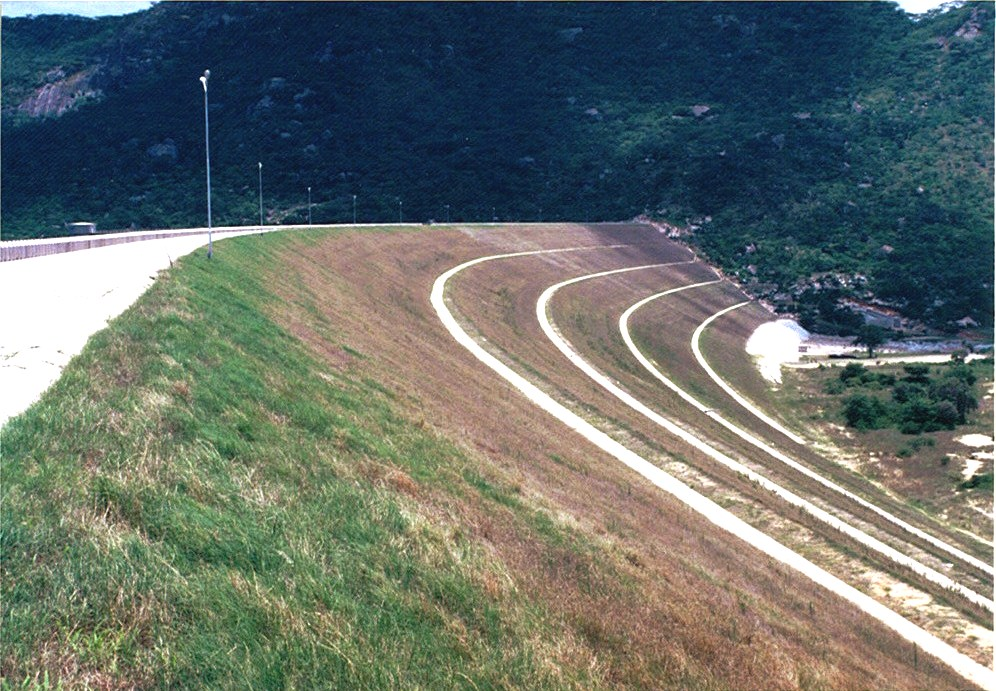
Downstream face

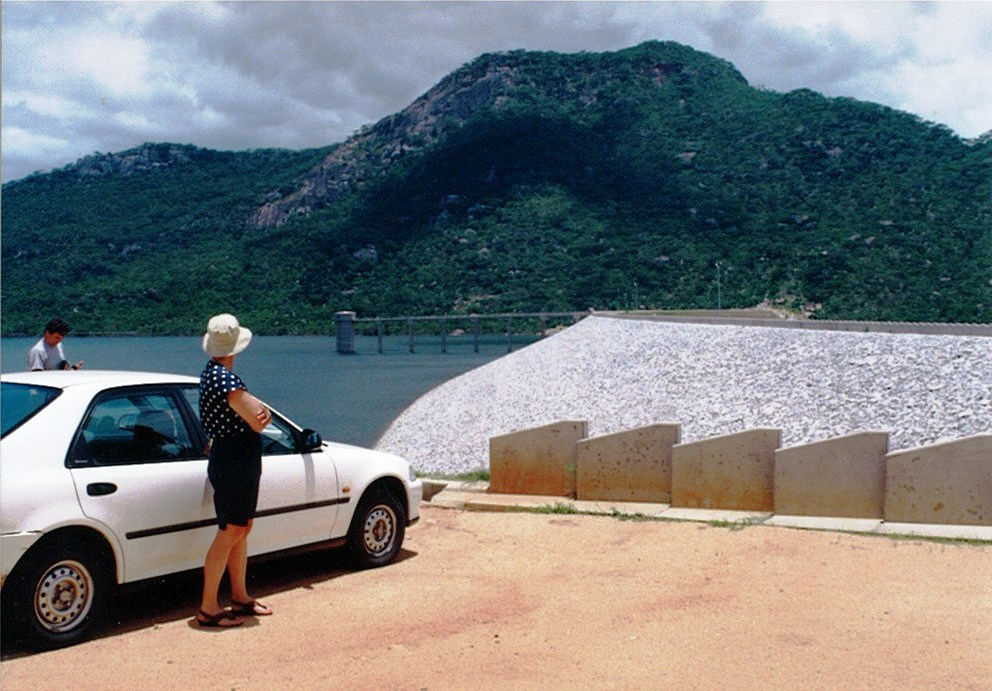
Before first filling

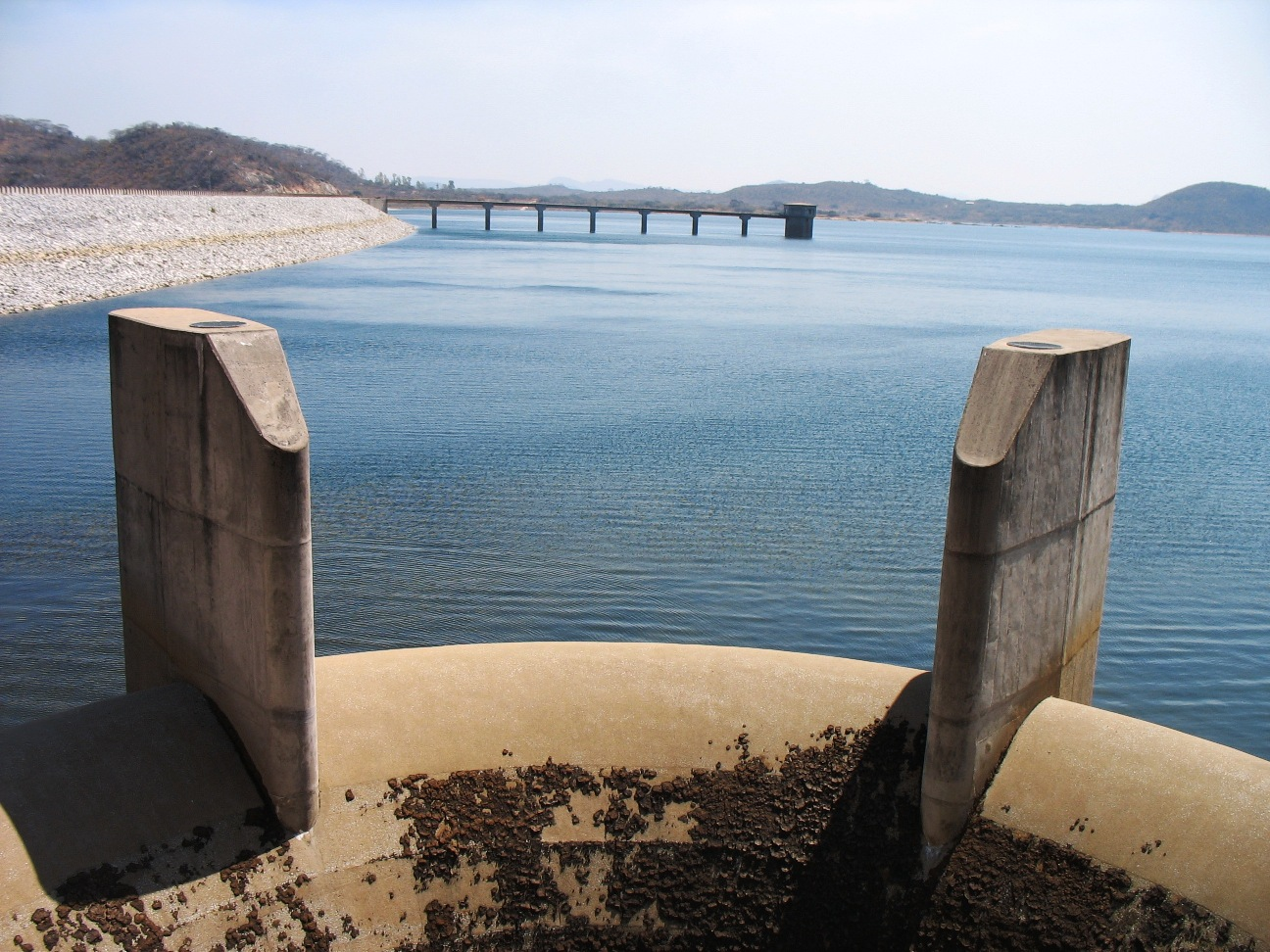
Spillway and outlet bridge 2010

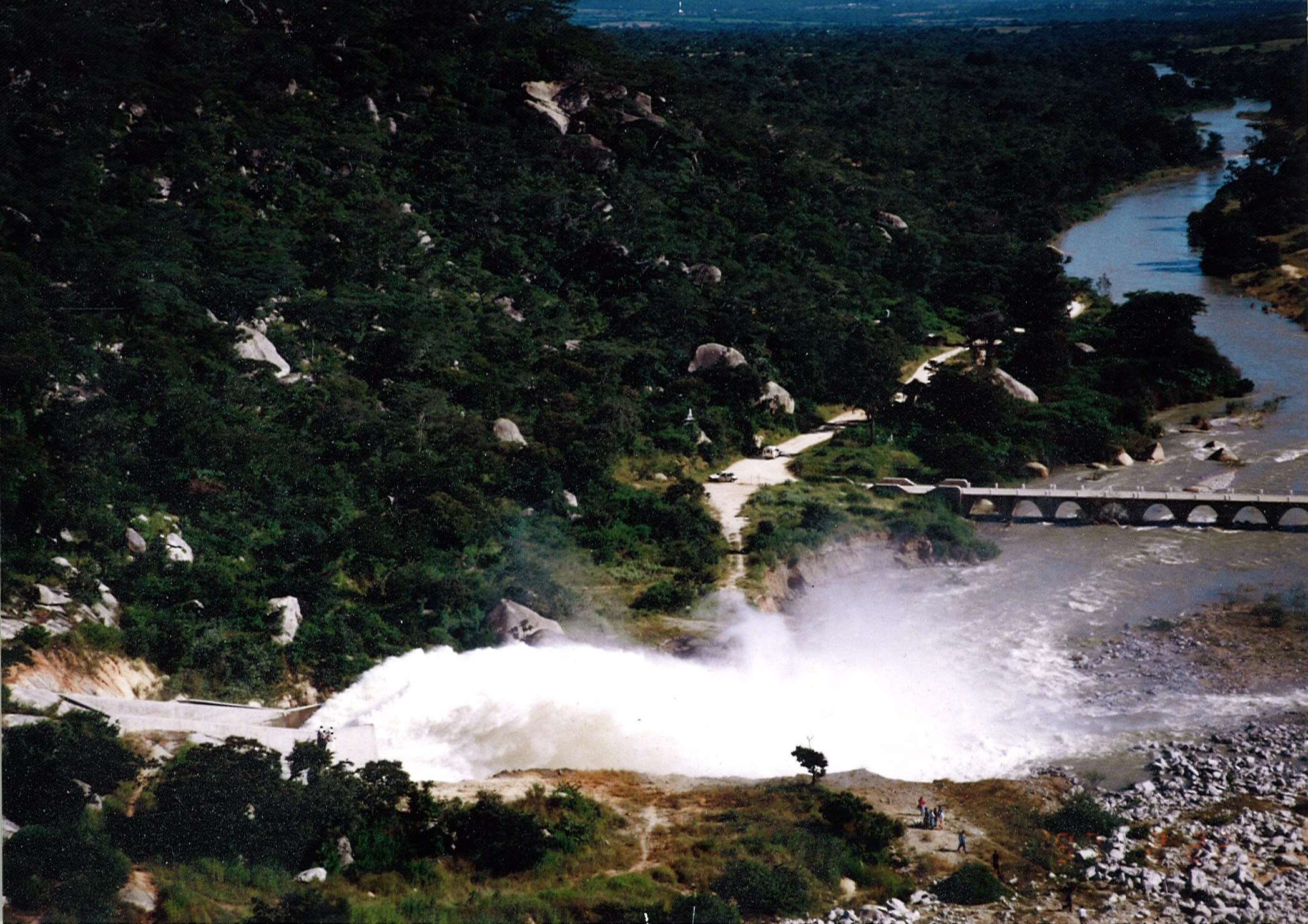
Spillway discharging

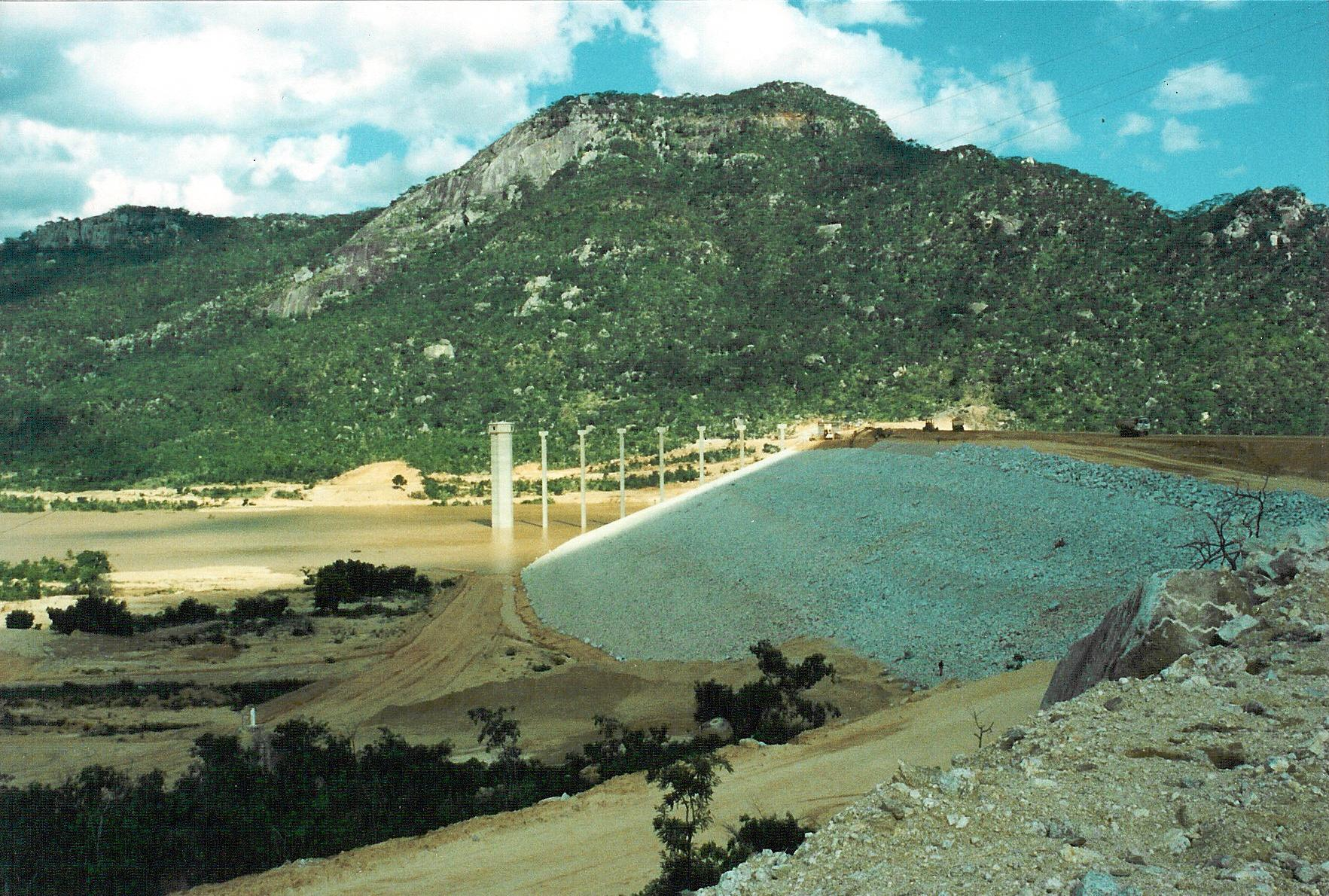
Final stages of construction

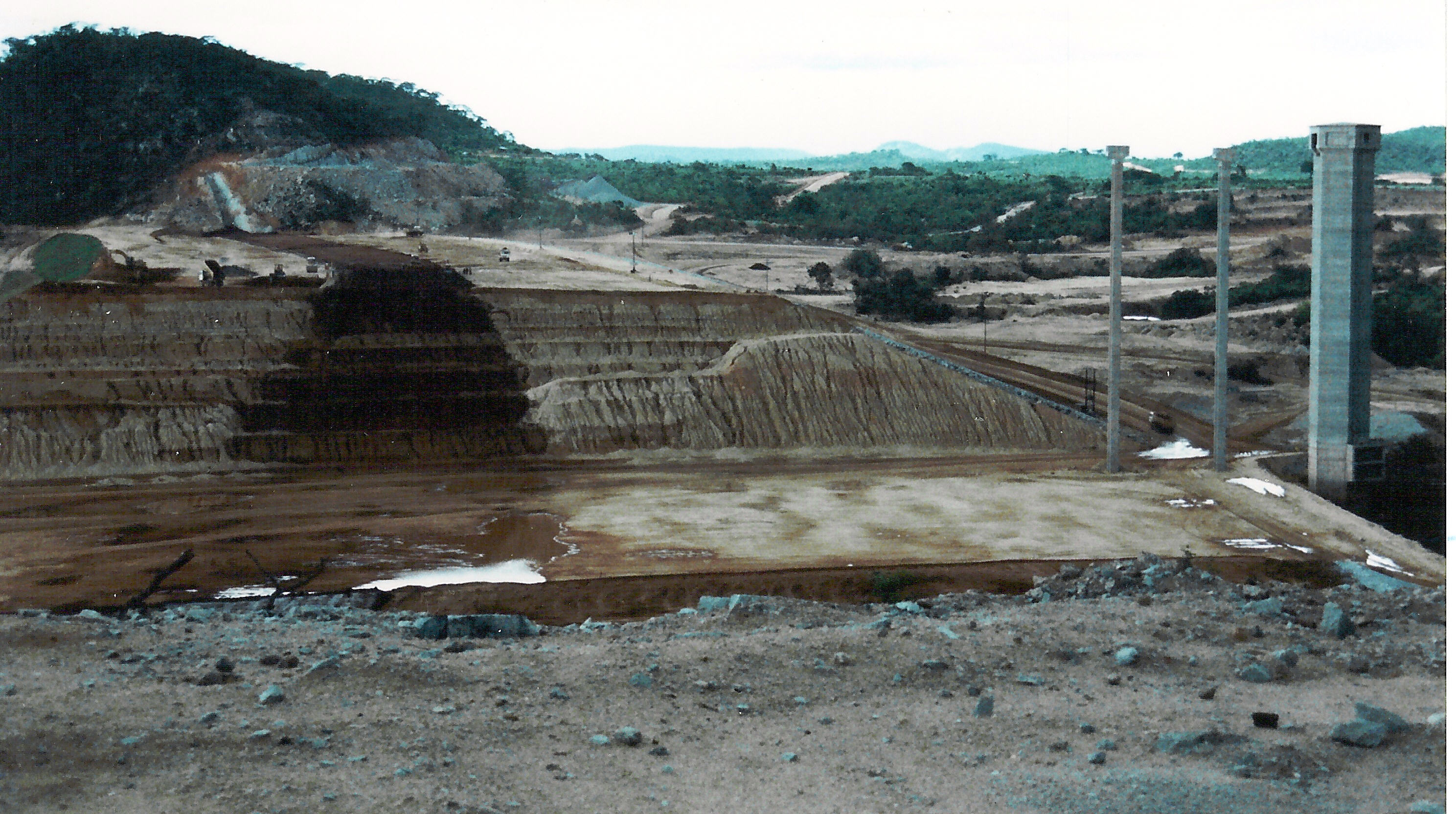
After first year of construction

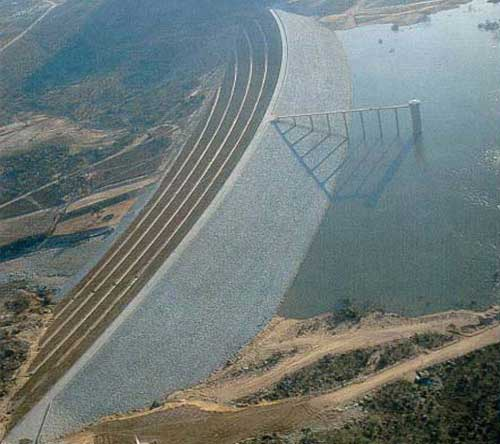
Aerial view after construction. 35% full
