= Nyanyadzi =

Coordinates: 19.780°S 32.424°E

Nyanyadzi (also Nyanadzi) is a village in Chimanimani District of Manicaland Province in Zimbabwe. It is located 96 km south of the city of Mutare on the main Mutare-Birchenough Bridge road, at the confluence of the Nyanyadzi, Odzi, and Save rivers. The village is the residential and commercial centre for a large irrigation scheme. It has shops and a police station.
