= Manyika people =

Ethnic group in Zimbabwe and Mozambique

Manyika Manyika
- Cluster
- Ethnicity: African
- Location: Zimbabwe, Mozambique
- Parent tribe: Shona
- Demonyms: Wanyika; Manyika; Wasu
- Branches: 5
- Language: Manyika Urban Dialect; Manyika (Northern Manyika); ChiBocha (Southern Manyika); ChiJindwi; ChiHera; ChiUngwe
- Religion: Christianity; African Traditional Religion (ATR); Muslim; Non Religious

The Manyika people are a Shona sub-group that originated from the Manyika kingdom. Manyika people speak several dialects which include ChiManyika (Northern Manyika), ChiBocha (Southern Manyika), ChiUngwe, ChiHera, Chijindwi and the Urban dialect which is spoken in urban centers like Mutare and Rusape.

The majority of Manyika come from the eastern region of Zimbabwe and western Mozambique. The dialect is widely spoken in Manicaland Province, upper parts of Mashonaland (Mutoko, Rushinga and Mudzi districts), Manica Province, Sofala, Tete and Zambezia. Those from Nyanga, Nyamaropa, Nyatate and surrounding regions speak the ChiManyika variant whereas those from the Buhera and Bocha areas spoke ChiHera and ChiBocha variants. There are inherent cultural norms in each of the sub-regions inhabited by the Manyika.

== Language ==
The Manyika language is a dialect of the broader Shona language. Largely spoken by the Manyika people in the eastern parts of Zimbabwe and across the border in Mozambique. During colonization the term was taken to include all people from Manicaland an administrative province of eastern Zimbabwe. The Manyika are the people under chief Mutasa whose territory used to stretch into now Mozambique. To the south it is bordered by the Jindwi dialect also known as Chibocha. The Jindwi share borders with the Ndau in Chimanimani stretching down to Chipinge and have the Vahera to the west. The Ndau dialect is complicated on its own with people from the dry parts distinct from those from the highlands. The other cultures and dialects married into the Manyika dialect are Chiungwe which is for the people mostly under Makoni this dialect is clearly distinct form the others mentioned above. Nyanga also has a lot of other dialects that are distinct from Zezuru and the Chimanyika where they were married into. The Wanyama under chief Saunyama and the Wahwesa in Kairezi, the Tangwena in Nyamaropa and the VaBarwe are dialects that were included to make the Manyika dialect.

Variations in local vocabulary and word prefixes exist. In East Africa, manyika means "be known"; therefore, some people have Manyika as their surname. The prefix Va- (used in Shona before male names to signify seniority and respect) is Sa- in Manyika. It is also replaced by wa-; vanhu vakaenda vakawanda becomes wanhu wakaenda wakawanda. However, in some areas Zezuru and Karanga words have been completely altered when they are translated into ChiManyika; for example, the Zezuru word Nhasi (meaning "today") becomes Nyamusi in Manyika.

The identification through cultures languages and artificial boundaries worked well in separating and dividing the Zimbabweans thus making it easier for the management and control of the administrative districts. This however failed to maintain and appreciate the religious and cultural norms of these dialects. This has been adopted by the current governments though these boundaries have been shifted the identification of these dialects as representing a culture is still to be considered. This has subsequently led to the abandonment and lack of appreciation of minority cultures by so doing killing the aspect of identity and belonging.

== History ==
In 1695 Emperor Changamire Dombo overran the rich gold-producing kingdom of Manyika, descending to the lowlands on the eastern edge of the country to destroy the Portuguese market town at Masikwesi. Dombo now controlled the whole gold-producing territory from Butwa in the southwest to Manyika in the northeast.

Another use for the word Manyika was developed by the Portuguese in the late 19th century.

On a Portuguese map of 1887...its boundaries extended along the Zambezi from Shupanga to near Tete, then south-west along the Mazoe and south by the Sabi river valley to its junction with the Odzi river, then east along the Musapa and Buzi rivers to the mouth of the Pungwe. This enormous size of Manyika was evidently fixed by political and commercial considerations. The Mazoe river valley was included because of rumours of abundant alluvial gold. The Kingdom of Manyika over which the Manyika rulers...exercised authority...was a much smaller area.

— H.H.H.K. Bhila, Trade and Politics in a Shona Kingdom: The Manyika and Their Portuguese and African Neighbours, 1575–1902 (London, 1982)

The greatly expanded Portuguese Manyika included the territory of Maungwe; the Portuguese treated the Makoni chiefs of Maungwe as independent sovereigns and made treaties with them.

A third use of Manyika was that made by the British as a counter to claims by the Portuguese and the SaManyika people. In their attempt to gain control of "the Pungwe River route, which was the main water way to and from Beira", the British South Africa Company imposed "a treaty on Mutasa on 14 September 1890". The treaty "provided that no one could possess land in Manyika except with the consent of the BSA Company". When it was signed the company invented its own "Greater Manyika", the western boundaries of which lay deep inside Portuguese territory; areas such as Mazoe and Maungwe, to which the company made different claims, were excluded. Once the company's frontiers had been fixed by means of war and arbitration, there was no longer any need to inflate the power and territory of Mutasa.

The kingdom of Manyika was divided between the two administrative districts of Umtali and Inyanga; much of its land was alienated to white farmers, and the administration was determined to advance a minimal definition of Manyikahood. "Umtassa's country and people are called Manyika", wrote Native Commissioner Umtali in January 1904. "They do not speak the same dialect as the other Mashonas". The desire to separate Mutasa from neighbouring peoples can be seen in early district reports from Umtali, in which Native Commissioner Hulley contended that the three chiefs in the district (Mutasa, Maranke and Zimunya) had distinct origins (even if there was a popular tendency to refer to his district as "Manicaland"). As far as the administrative district of Makoni was concerned, the Native Department emphasized the distinction between its people and the Manyika. In 1910 there was a boundary dispute between the Native Commissioners of Makoni and Inyanga districts. Native Commissioner Inyanga wrote Superintendent of Natives Umtali to explain why he was collecting tax from Africans on farms which lay just within the western border of Makoni district:

There are no Makoni (Shonga) natives on any of these farms. I have always acted on your suggestion—that is I have dealt with Manyikas only...[Let] the Native Commissioner Rusapi deal with Makoni natives and I with Manyika...No dispute should arise.

— Inyanga, NAZ NUA 3/2/1 Native Commissioner Inyanga to Superintendent of Natives Umtali, 2 April 1910

The matter was decided; the Chief Native Commissioner determined that "the N.C., Inyanga deal with all Manyika natives and the N.C., Rusapi with all the Makoni". The Native Department politically and culturally separated the Ungwe of Makoni from the Manyika. In 1915, a debate arose within the Native Department about the significance of the term mayinini in relation to Manyika marriage customs. Llewellyn Meredith (who had been Native Commissioner in both Melsetter and Makoni districts, whose inhabitants were considered Manyika) expressed his opinion about "Manica customs and language", but was scorned by the Manyika specialists. Superintendent of Natives Umtali mocked Meredith's "18 years experience of Manyika customs gathered in other districts" and invoked the authority of Archdeacon Etheridge (the leading missionary expert on Mutasa's chiefdom). "I do not of course know", wrote Etheridge, "what word may be used in Chindau, or Chirungwe, the dialects spoken in Melsetter and Rusape [Makoni] districts, but as regards Chimanyika there is no question at all".
