= Bocha =

Bocha may refer to:

- Bocce
- Bocha, Nepal
- The Bocha Chiefdom in Zimbabwe
