= Nyashanu Mission =

Nyashanu Mission is located in Buhera District, Manicaland Province, Zimbabwe in the area of Ishe Mabvuregudo (local Chief) in the local country of Mambo Nyashanu (local King).

== History of the mission ==
Makumbe mission under Ishe Makumbe (Gambiza) was the first station in Buhera District. The mission station was founded in 1909 by colonial white missionaries who were assisted by their colleagues at Dutch Reformed Church (DRC) run stations of Gutu Mission and Alheit Ching'ombe Mission. Support also came from the Dutch Reformed Church headquarters in Masvingo and South Africa and the Netherlands in Europe where the church originated. Makumbe Mission was established Reverend P. A. Badenhorst who had been transferred from Zimuto Mission and was a Reverend in the Dutch Reformed Church, a church of Boers who created apartheid in South Africa. A secondary school was opened at Makumbe in 1915. This was followed by a teacher training school in 1950, primary school and a high school. In 1954, Makumbe mission assisted in the founding of Nyashanu Mission. The name of the missionary who helped start the station at Nyashanu in 1954 was probably Badenhorst but they were others.

The purpose of the missionaries was twofold. First, they were part of a larger scheme by white people to colonise Africa. Second, they were part of a religious movements that competed for growth of their church beliefs in Africa. The Dutch Reformed Church was one of them. Both purposes were motivated by the colonial belief that African ways of life should be replaced with white ways. But the hidden and main mission was to colonise the people in the area, and ultimately colonise Zimbabwe with the help of people like Cecil John Rhodes. For several years, the missionaries decimated African society, disrespected African ways of life and separated believers from their community. On a positive note, they contributed to development of education, agriculture and health. The first mission was Morgenster established by Andries Adriaan Louw in September 1891. Louw was supported by the first group of colonisers known by white people as the pioneer column because initially Inkosi Lobengula has rejected their coming.

The facilities of the Reformed Church include:

1. Mabhuku (bookshop)
2. Munyai Washe (church magazine)
3. Murray Theological College
4. The Margaretha Hugo School for the Blind (Copata)
5. Reformed Church University
6. Morgenster Mission (founded 1891)
7. Gutu Mission (1892)
8. Chibi Mission (1894)
9. Ngomahura Mission (1899)
10. Pamushana (1901)
11. Zimuto Mission (1904)
12. Alheit Ching'ombe Mission (1906)
13. Jichidza Mission (1908)
14. Makumbe Mission (1914)
15. Nyashanu Mission (1954)

All the work they did was not possible without the work of Black evangelists and workers. For example, it was said:

Louw set off by ox-cart in April 1891 accompanied by seven Sotho-speaking African evangelists. After a laborious journey of several months, they reached Chief Mugabe’s mountain near the Great Zimbabwe ruins. With the Chief’s permission, a mission was established on 9 September 1891 about 35 km from Fort Victoria (Masvingo).

To establish the church and the mission at Nyashanu, the missionaries were supported and approved by the Rhodesian colonial government through the sub-district Native Commissioner who was based at Buhera Office and the substantive Native Commissioner who has based at Charter near Chivhu. With this support, it was easy to get approval from local King Makiwa Nyashanu and local chief Mabvuregudo. They were given land far away from villages, near Mwerahari River and Masenga Mountain. At this point, the country King, Mambo Tohwechipi The Zimbabwe King, Rozvi Empire Dynasty) had been deposed by the colonial regime, and was living near Mavengwe area between local King Makumbe and local King Nyashanu's area. Tohwechipi was later killed around 1968 and his grave is a national monument protected by the National Monuments of Zimbabwe in Mavangwe Hills, Buhera. Tohwechipi became the last King of Zimbabwe.

Nyashanu Mission was the last Mission established by the Dutch Reformed Church in Zimbabwe before they handed over church assets to the African Reformed Church on 4 May 1977 as a result of the armed struggle. The white missionaries supported the white regime, so they found it hard to remain in Zimbabwe. They left Zimbabwe for South Africa. At independence in 1980, the African Reformed Church changed its name to Reformed Church in Zimbabwe.

== Mission services and infrastructure ==
The services at the mission include a clinic, a church, Nyashanu High School and Nyashanu Primary School. It is not yet clear when each of these started. The clinic is currently run with the assistance of the Ministry of Health and Child Welfare while the schools are run by the Reformed Church in Zimbabwe and assistance from the government. The main mission station has a clinic, a boarding high school (forms 1-6) and church. The high school also enrols day scholars or non-boarders. The primary school is located about 1500 metres away from the main station and is not a boarding.

The infrastructure of the main station includes several classroom blocks disability resource centre (visual impairment) two laboratories, buildings for practical subjects, staff houses, dormitories, sports fields, a cattle pen, grazing paddocks, boreholes with water engines, water tanks, church building, mortuary, clinic building (number of beds unknown), staff room, dining hall, garden, grinding mill, library, study centre, small shop, storage facilities, a road, grid electricity and a forest from where firewood is obtained.

== Nyashanu High School ==
The school was run by white missionaries until they left in 1977 during the Second Chimurenga, the war of Zimbabwe's liberation. At independence in 1980, Mr Samson Mzilikazi Shava was appointed the new headmaster. He retired in 2013 to become for Education Secretary for the Reformed Church in Zimbabwe. in 2014, Daniel Jeche became the next principal.

The school's motto is vane shungu vachafara, meaning the motivated will prosper or be happy.

The school has four sports houses, and these are named in accordance of some houses of Nyashanu, the Mambo of the area. These houses are:

1. Mudawose (Yellow colour)
2. Mufakose (Green colour)
3. Muradzikwa (Blue colour)
4. Dirikwi (Red colour)

The school is known for academic excellence and sports achievement in Buhera District and in Zimbabwe and boasts an alumni renowned in the country and globally.
