= Malik Khuda Bakhsh Bucha =

Pakistani politician

Malik Khuda Bakhsh Bucha was a former agriculture minister of Pakistan. He served in the cabinet of Ayub Khan. He died in March 2002 at the age of 97. He was the leader of House (akin to a chief minister) West Pakistan Assembly from 1966 to 1968.
