= Zimbabwe National Liberation War Veterans Association =

ZNLWVA
- Zimbabwe National Liberation War Veterans Association
- Founded: 1989
- Headquarters: Harare, Zimbabwe
- Location: Zimbabwe
- Members: 30,000
- Key people: Christopher Mutsvangwa, Chairman; Joseph Chinotimba, Vice-Chairman
- Affiliations: ZANU-PF

Zimbabwe National Liberation War Veterans Association (ZNLWVA) is a Zimbabwean organisation established by former guerrillas of the Zimbabwe African National Liberation Army (ZANLA) and Zimbabwe People's Revolutionary Army (ZIPRA) who served during the Rhodesian Bush War. While not considered a state entity, the ZNLWVA is dependent on funding and support from Zimbabwe's ruling party, the Zimbabwe African National Union - Patriotic Front (ZANU-PF). In 2005, the government looked into ways to make members of the organisation part of the army of Zimbabwe.

== History ==
The ZNLWVA was formed in April 1989 by disgruntled former ZANLA and ZIPRA personnel, many of whom felt that they had received insufficient rewards for their wartime service. During the Rhodesian Bush War, a number of the guerrillas and their supporters had been led to believe that they would receive land expropriated from the country's white minority in the event of a military or political victory. When significant land reform failed to take place immediately after the war, they felt the promises of their political leadership with regards to this issue had not been truly fulfilled.

In accordance with the Lancaster House Agreement, the Zimbabwean government agreed to delay land redistribution by means of compulsory seizure for ten years. While at least 20% of white-owned farmland was successfully purchased and redistributed between 1980 and 1989, only 50,000 households benefited from this phase of the programme. Additionally, a disproportionate amount of the redistributed land was being held by fewer than 600 landowners, most of whom were wealthy, politically connected and owned multiple properties. Veterans felt disenfranchised and the founders of the ZNLWVA believed they should be the primary beneficiaries of the land.

The ZNLWVA's founding in 1989 was opposed by the government, which initially perceived it as a political threat. Following its first congress in 1992, the ZNLWVA resolved to secure the welfare of all ZANLA or ZIPRA veterans, and lobby the state on their behalf concerning two issues: pensions and other public benefits, and land ownership. Both were equally contentious issues. ZNLWVA records noted that about 35,000 guerrillas had been demobilised at the end of the Rhodesian Bush War. They received a flat severance sum from the Zimbabwean military of about Z$400, with a two-year allowance of Z$185 per month. Some veterans believed this was grossly inadequate, and demanded formal military pensions for their years of service. Additionally, another 25,000 guerrillas had been dismissed before the military began implementing the severance sums and allowances; these received nothing. By 1985 half of the demobilised guerrillas were also insolvent, having been unable to secure long-term employment or receive job training due to rising unemployment.

ZNLWVA was a virtual non-entity in the politics of Zimbabwe for eight years after it was founded. That changed when Chenjerai Hunzvi became its chairman in 1997. Hunzvi bitterly criticised ZANU-PF for profiting itself while its former guerrillas were ignored and cheated. Since 1980, war veterans had collectively been robbed of a total of $10 billion by ZANU (PF) senior officials and Robert Mugabe's close relatives. In the wake of the war veterans' demands, the government panicked and had to pay off as concessions. The ZNLWVA pointed out that ZIPRA and ZANLA personnel excluded from the Zimbabwe National Army at independence had received only meagre pensions of Z$185 per month until 1983. Members had watched these savings evaporate in the wake of a growing financial crisis in the early 1990s. The organisation demonstrated at ZANU-PF headquarters in Harare and successfully lobbied for additional gratuities of Z$50,000 (equivalent to US$4000). Tax free pensions of Z$2,000 a month were also conceded. This success inspired the protests of another group, the Women in the National Liberation War Collaborators Association, which called on President Robert Mugabe to also compensate female partisans who had served as scouts and spies during the bush war.

In January 2000, ZNLWVA wrote a letter addressed to Queen Elizabeth II and communicated through Peter Longworth, the British High Commissioner to Zimbabwe. It gave vent to the frustrations of landless veterans and blamed the nation's white minority of predominantly British descent for refusing to participate in constructive land reform. ZNLWVA threatened a "bloodbath" in future "clashes against commercial farmers" unless land hunger was addressed to their satisfaction. Throughout the early 2000s, members of ZNLWVA, notably Joseph Chinotimba, forcibly occupied a number of white-owned commercial farms, which the ZNLWVA described as the Third Chimurenga.

During the 2000 Zimbabwean parliamentary election, the ZNLWVA orchestrated a campaign of political violence against supporters of the Movement for Democratic Change (MDC). ZNLWVA members working on behalf of ZANU-PF were often accused of abducting, assaulting and killing those with close ties to the MDC. Due to the organization's political clout and known affiliation with several ZANU-PF cabinet ministers, the Zimbabwe Republic Police was reluctant to investigate the ZNLWVA for its alleged crimes.

== Instrument for ZANU-PF ==
ZNLWVA has a close alliance with Zimbabwe African National Union-Patriotic Front (ZANU-PF), the ruling party, and by extension the government formerly led by Robert Mugabe. In all elections since 2000, the members of the ZNLWVA, commonly known as 'war vets' have spearheaded election campaigns for ZANU-PF. After the leadership of Chenjerai Hunzvi came Habulani Sibanda and Joseph Chinotimba. As such war veterans became instrumental for ZANU-PF in suppressing the opposition through the use of harassment, intimidation, and violence. They often act alongside the ZANU-PF's youth formation.

== List of chairmen ==
No.	Name	Period
1	John Gwitira	April 1989 – 1997
2	Chenjerai Hunzvi	1997 – 4 June 2001
3	Jabulani Sibanda	2001 – 15 November 2014
4	Christopher Mutsvangwa	15 November 2014 –
5	Hoyini Bhila	30 March 2018 – present
