= Bocha Chiefdom =

Chiefdom in Zimbabwe

Bocha is an area in Marange Communal Lands, Mutare District, Zimbabwe, across the Save river from Buhera.

Johane Marange Apostolic Church is the main religious group in Bocha, which is the location of the Mafararikwa Shrine, and the place of origin of that church, lead as of 2023 by High Priest Nimrod Taguta.

Holy Ghost, Marange High, St Noah College, Maponde Primary, St Zachariah, St Abel, Mafararikwa Primary and Secondary, Nyangani, Mukunguma are some of the schools in Bocha.

Benard Makungauta Murwira, Chief Marange is a local Chief of the area.
