= Tichaona Jokonya =

Zimbabwean politician, civil servant and diplomat

Doctor Tichaona Jokonya

Minister of Information and Publicity of Zimbabwe
- In office April 2005 – 24 June 2006
- President: Robert Mugabe

Personal details
- Born: 27 December 1938 Rhodesia and Nyasaland
- Died: 24 June 2006 (aged 67)
- Party: Zimbabwe African National Union-Patriotic Front

Dr Tichaona Joseph Benjamin Jokonya (27 December 1938 – 24 June 2006) was a Zimbabwean politician, civil servant and diplomat.

== Early life ==
Jokonya was born in the Charter District, since renamed Chikomba and attended Lourdes Mission and Kutama College before training as a primary schoolteacher. After six years he was promoted to be Headmaster of Badza Primary School. While at work he continued to study for qualifications by post, passing GCE O and A levels, and then went to the University of Rhodesia.

== Academic career ==
In 1965 Jokonya became more involved in politics and was appointed as Secretary for Political Affairs by the National Union of Zimbabwe Students. The NUZS supported majority rule and after the Unilateral Declaration of Independence Jokonya left the country, fearing that he would be detained. After travelling through Botswana, and Zambia he settled in Nairobi, Kenya where he enrolled at the university for a history degree.

Jokonya was a good student and was awarded a Commonwealth Scholarship for a postgraduate degree at the University of Sussex School of African Studies in 1968, at which he wrote a dissertation on military intervention in politics in Africa. He followed this with a thesis on colonial land policy in Malawi, and went on to the University of London's Institute of Education where he was awarded a Postgraduate Certificate in Education in 1971. He taught in Birmingham for six years in the 1970s. In January 2002, he received an MA in Government and Politics, and a Certification in International Law and Diplomacy at St. John's University in New York.

== Return to Zimbabwe ==
With the advent of majority rule, Dr Jokonya returned and was employed as a lecturer at the University of Zimbabwe, specialising in modern British and European history. However, he was swiftly recruited to be part of the new ZANU PF government as deputy permanent secretary in the Ministry of Youth, Sport and Recreation in 1980. In 1983 Dr Jokonya was appointed as Zimbabwean ambassador to Ethiopia. As such he was also permanent representative to the Organisation of African Unity.

Dr Jokonya returned from this post to be Permanent Secretary to the Ministry of Political Affairs in 1988, and took the additional role of Secretary for Foreign Affairs in 1990. He became concerned about expenditure on diplomatic missions and set them spending targets, while also pressing for returns to Zimbabwe through increased exports; he set up a statistical monitoring system to make sure the expected benefits were being delivered.

== United Nations ==
In 1992 Dr Jokonya became permanent representative to the United Nations in Geneva, and from 1999 he was promoted to work at the UN headquarters in New York. He was a personal representative of President Robert Mugabe to the G-15 developing countries movement. However, the latter part of his term saw him defending Zimbabwe against attempts by some European countries to impose sanctions arising out of their opposition to Zimbabwean land reform policies.

Dr Jokonya was a personal beneficiary of the land reform, being allocated three formerly white-owned farms. In 2003, he was appointed the chief executive officer of the Zimbabwe Tourism Authority, an appointment inspired by the need to improve the foreign currency earning power of the Zimbabwean tourism market. He refocused marketing to seek tourists from China, France and South Africa instead of the United States, United Kingdom and Germany, saying "It is wrong to send attaches to countries which we are fighting against". His term saw a rapid increase in the number of tourists coming to Zimbabwe from Asia.

== Information Minister ==
Following the 2005 election, Dr Jokonya was appointed Minister of Information. In contrast to the previous Minister Jonathan Moyo, Dr Jokonya tried to reach out to media sources which were less friendly to the Zimbabwe government. However, he frequently suggested that journalists should remember their patriotism, and was highly critical of those who wrote stories critical of Zimbabwe government policies for foreign media. According to Jan Raath in The Times, he described them as traitors and then said "You know what the end of a traitor is? Death."

On taking up his office, Dr Jokonya offered regular meetings with journalists to discuss their coverage. He told them "I would want to make presentations to them on various subjects and one area I would want to deliver a paper on is on human rights because this term has been viewed from an Anglo-Saxon perspective."

He worked to restructure Zimbabwe Broadcasting Holdings, which had been created as an umbrella company when the Zimbabwe Broadcasting Corporation was split up. In the week before he died he announced that the multitude of companies would be merged into two (Zimbabwe Television Services and Zimbabwe Radio Services) with ZBH having one group chief executive officer and two managing directors. He was found dead in his hotel room on 24 June 2006.

He was placed on the United States sanctions list in 2005 and remained there until his death.
