= John Makumbe =

Zimbabwean political scientist

- Born: May 6, 1949; Buhera, Manicaland, Zimbabwe
- Died: January 7, 2013 (aged 63); Chadcombe, Harare, Zimbabwe
- Education: University of Botswana, Lesotho and Swaziland; University of Zimbabwe; University of Tasmania
- Awards: Honorary LLD, University of Birmingham
- Scientific career
- Fields: Political science
- Workplaces: University of Zimbabwe; Michigan State University

John Mudiwa Washe Makumbe (May 6, 1949—January 27, 2013), often published as John Mw Makumbe, was a Zimbabwean political scientist, political philosopher and activist. He was a professor at the University of Zimbabwe for more than 25 years, and a frequent guest lecturer at Michigan State University. He was a pro-democracy opinion columnist and member of civil society organisations critical of Robert Mugabe and the ZANU–PF, as well as an activist for the welfare of albino people in Zimbabwe. Shortly before his death he became a prominent member of the Movement for Democratic Change, and he was expected to enter politics by contesting the Buhera West parliamentary constituency.

== Education and positions ==
Makumbe was born in the village of Marenga in the Buhera District of Manicaland Province in the East of Zimbabwe. In the 1970s, Makumbe trained as a school teacher. He then obtained a B.A. degree in Administration at the University of Botswana, Lesotho and Swaziland. After Zimbabwe gained independence in 1980, Makumbe obtained a second B.A. degree at the University of Zimbabwe. In 1986, he completed a PhD at the University of Tasmania in Tasmania, Australia, which he attended on a Commonwealth Scholarship. His PhD thesis was entitled Management training institutions in developing countries: proposed criteria for institutional effectiveness.

== Research ==
Makumbe pursued an academic career in Zimbabwe, where he spent more than 25 years as a professor at the University of Zimbabwe and was an active public intellectual. He resisted opportunities to leave Zimbabwe, though throughout his career he was a frequent guest lecturer at Michigan State University. Makumbe has been considered a member of a small generation of pro-democracy scholar-activists who earned their PhDs shortly after Zimbabwean Independence and established the instruction of political science and administration at the University of Zimbabwe; other members of this group were Elphas Mukonoweshuro and Masipula Sithole.

Makumbe was the author of several books. In 1996, he published Participatory development: The case of Zimbabwe, and in 1999 he wrote Democracy and Development in Zimbabwe: Constraints of Decentralisation. He also coauthored the 2000 book Behind the Smokescreen with Daniel Compagnon, which studies the defects in Zimbabwe's electoral system that they argue enable the rigging of elections.

In his capacity as a public intellectual, Makumbe regularly published editorials in newspapers including The Zimbabwean. This frequently prompted denunciations of him by the government and state media. On at least one occasion, he was arrested and beaten by state forces for participating in peaceful pro-democratic gatherings. He was particularly critical of Robert Mugabe and the ZANU–PF, and was active in anti-corruption work. In this capacity he worked closely with Margaret Dongo. In addition to anti-authoritarian activism, Makumbe was an albino person and was active in promoting the welfare of that community in Zimbabwe. In 1996, he founded the Zimbabwe Association of Albinos, and he was a board member of many civil society groups. Makumbe was regularly quoted in or interviewed by international outlets including The Washington Times and The Guardian, as well as in documentaries.

In 2004, Makumbe was granted an honorary LLD degree by the University of Birmingham.

Makumbe openly joined the Movement for Democratic Change in 2011, announcing his new affiliation at their 12th anniversary celebrations at the Gwanzura stadium. He had previously been an advisor in the creation of the party's founding documents. At the time of his death at the age of 63, (Note: Makumbe's age at the time of his death is also variously reported as 64 and 65, which are inconsistent with the stated dates of birth and death.) Makumbe had been actively gathering support to challenge the Police Chief Superintendent Oliver Mandipaka to represent the parliamentary constituency of Buhera West, which included his home village of Marenga.

== Selected works ==
- Participatory development: The case of Zimbabwe (1996)
- Democracy and Development in Zimbabwe: Constraints of Decentralisation (1999)
- Behind the Smokescreen, with Daniel Compagnon (2000)

== Selected awards ==
- Honorary LLD, University of Birmingham (2004)
