= Passion Java =

Zimbabwean preacher (1987-)

- Born: Panganai Java; 29 October 1987 (age 39); Harare, Zimbabwe
- Other name: Twabam
- Occupations: Clergyman; businessman; socialite; musician; music producer
- Spouse(s): Yasmin Java (div. 2015) Lily Tsegaye (m. 2016)

Passion Java (born Panganai Java; 29 October 1987) is a Zimbabwean, Christian preacher, socialite, entrepreneur, music promoter and author. He is also an associate of the Zimbabwean president, Emerson Mnangagwa.

== Background ==
Born Panganai Java, Passion Java was born in Harare the capital city of Zimbabwe in a family of six children. He is the fifth child of the late MDC Alliance senator for Buhera Cristine Rambanepasi Java and the late Charles Java. He grew up in Chitungwiza and had his secondary education at Seke 2 High School. He is from Java Village in Buhera Central. According to his mother in an interview, Java started prophesying when he was in grade four, when he predicted his father's death who then died on a Sunday that same week. In 2018 Passion Java is said to have predicted the death of his brother clergy Batsirai Java's late wife Vimbai Tsvangirai, who was the daughter of MDC founder Morgan Tsvangirai, Passion Java predicted her death two weeks prior.

== Ministry ==
Passion Java started church ministry work at his brother's church Tabernacles of Grace before moving on to start his own church Kingdom Embassy. He started Kingdom Embassy as a prophet in 2010 at the Chitungwiza Aquatic Complex and grew to prominence when he was predicting phone numbers and ID numbers of audience members in services. In 2013 Java made headlines when he claimed to have performed a miracle abortion on a four month pregnant woman. In 2013 Java launched a satellite television channel for his church called Kingdom TV through ViewSat Limited, a UK telecommunications company, the television channel is now defunct due to unpaid fees reported to be around seven figures. He became the youngest Zimbabwean ever to own a television channel at the age of 25.

Java is said to be mentored by Noel Jones and Benny Hinn as his advisor.

== Involvement in music ==
In 2015 Java launched music label called PJ Records where gospel artists would go and record music for free. In 2017 Java started promoting Zimdancehall artists which include Enzo Ishall, Soul Jah Love, Buffalo Souljah, Jah Master, Roki and several others through Passion Java Records. In 2020 Java launched Gara Mumba Iwe Series where he provided a platform for artists to perform live on social media during the coronavirus pandemic. In 2021 Java was named as the most influential Zimbabwean under 40.

== Involvement in Politics ==
Ahead of the 2023 elections in Zimbabwe, Passion Java began to be involved in the political campaigns of ZANU PF, publicly endorsing Emmerson Mnangagwa in his bid for re-election. He had been seen several times at the Zimbabwe State House with president Mnangagwa. In a collaboration between Roki the local artist and the famous Congolese musician Kofi Olomide in the song Patati Patata, Passion Java persuaded or encouraged Kofi Olomide to mention the name of Mnangagwa in the song. Passion Java also joined the Affirmative Action Group (AAG) founded by Peter Pamire and Phillip Chiyangwa, Passion Java is the incumbent vice president of the group. AAG is working with president Mnangagwa to promote the National Development Strategy, which is his 2023 political message for re-election.

== Controversy ==
Passion Java has been criticized by the press and some Christian pastors for his flamboyant lifestyle, with journalists like Hopewell Chin'ono condemning his influence on social media and his relationship with president Mnangagwa. In 2021, Java was criticized for his gun possession and tattoos which he attributed to his love for the murderous Mnangagwa regime after a video of him showing his gun collection went viral on social media. He is a well known conman of repute. The public was warned by Zimbabwe Republic Police in August 2020.

He also courted controversy over a bar tab raised at a restaurant in Pretoria, South Africa which amounted to 1.3 million South African rand (over $85,000 USD), which later surfaced to be proceeds from the Covidgate scandal which rocked President Mnangagwa's family.

== Personal life ==
Passion Java is devorced to Lily Java and together they have three children. He has one child with his ex-wife Yasmin who he divorced in 2015 shortly after meeting Lily.

== More links ==
- Passion Java at IMDb
- Passion Java in Eastern Highlands
- Nelson Chamisa on Passion Java
- Passion Java Interview with Zimpapers
- 100 Most Influential Zimbabweans
- 40 MOST INFLUENTIAL YOUNG LEADERS IN ZIMBABWE
