= Charles Utete =

Zimbabwean academic

- Born: October 30, 1938; Chivu, Zimbabwe
- Died: July 15, 2016 (aged 77); Harare, Zimbabwe
- Education: University of Zimbabwe; Tufts University; Carleton University
- Occupations: Known for Being the Chief Secretary to the President and Cabinet
- Spouse: Verna Lucy Utete

Charles Munhamu Utete, Charles Munhamu Botsio Utete (October 30, 1938 – July 15, 2016) was a Zimbabwean academic.

== History ==
He was the Chairman of Cairns Holdings Ltd. since January 2007. He served as a Director at Seed Co. Ltd., and had been a Director at Zimbabwe Newspapers (1980) Ltd. since September 2009 He retired from government in 2003.

Utete was born in Chivhu and went to primary school in Kwenda Mission school. He studied at the University of Zimbabwe. After completing his first degree he traveled to Boston, Massachusetts in the United States where he completed a Masters in Political Science at Tufts University. He then enrolled at Carleton University in Ottawa, Ontario, Canada until 1971 where he completed an MA and PhD in International Relations and Public Administration.

He was put on the United States sanctions list in 2003 and remained on the list until 2016.

== Death ==
Utete died on 15 July 2016. He collapsed at his Highlands home in Harare. Zanu-PF declared him a national hero and he became the first civil servant to be buried at the National Heroes Acre.
