= Chikomba District =

District in Mashonaland East, Zimbabwe

Coordinates: 18°53′S 31°06′E

- second-level administrative subdivision
- Interactive map of Chikomba District
- Country: Zimbabwe
- Province: Mashonaland East

Area
  - Total: 6,503 km^{2} (2,511 sq mi)

Population (2022 census)
  - Total: 123,932
  - Density: 19.06/km^{2} (49.36/sq mi)
- Time zone: UTC+1 (CET)
  - Summer (DST): UTC+1 (CEST)

Chikomba is a district of Zimbabwe. It was previously part of Midlands Province, but was delimited to fall under Mashonaland East Province in the 1990s.

== Notable people ==
- Chenjerai Hunzvi, politician and war veterans leader
- Solomon Mujuru, army general and politician
- Tichaona Jokonya, politician
- Charles Mungoshi, writer
- Grace Mugabe (nee Marufu), politician and former First Lady of the Republic of Zimbabwe
- Charles Utete, former Chief Secretary to the President and Cabinet in the Zimbabwean government under Robert Mugabe.
- James Chimombe, Musician
