= Flicker vertigo =

Vertigo caused by strobe light

Flicker vertigo, sometimes called the Bucha effect, is "an imbalance in brain-cell activity caused by exposure to low-frequency flickering (or flashing) of a relatively bright light." It is a disorientation-, vertigo-, and nausea-inducing effect of a strobe light flashing at 1 Hz to 20 Hz, approximately the frequency of human brainwaves. The effects are similar to seizures caused by epilepsy (in particular photosensitive epilepsy), but are not restricted to people with histories of epilepsy.

This phenomenon has been observed during helicopter flight; a Dr. Bucha identified the phenomenon in the 1950s when called upon to investigate a series of similar and unexplained helicopter crashes. Flicker vertigo in a helicopter occurs when the pilot or front passenger looks up through the blades of the main rotor as it turns in the sun causing the light to strobe.

The strobe light effect can cause persons who are vulnerable to flicker vertigo to experience symptoms such as:

- Become disoriented and/or nauseated
- Blink rapidly
- Experience rapid eye movements behind closed eyelids
- Lose control of fine motor functions
- Experience muscle rigidity

These effects are typically very minor and will most often subside within seconds once exposure to the strobe effect has ceased, though residual nausea and minor disorientation may be felt for several minutes.

In extremely rare cases, severe reactions can happen including:

- Total persistent loss of bodily functions
- Loss of muscle/motor response
- Loss of control of aircraft or other moving vehicles
- Seizure

This situation can occur whenever flickering light conditions exist. Examples of this include:

- Using electronics on low-light conditions for extended periods
- Sunlight flickering through a tree-lined street
- Sunlight reflecting off water, especially off of rippling waves
- Fixed wing flight
- Looking at or through a slowly spinning propeller

According to The US Naval Flight Surgeons Manual, flicker vertigo is a rare occurrence.

Flicker vertigo has been considered as a principle for various forms of non-lethal weapons. A related crowd-control device was invented by Charles Bovill, which "employed a combination of ultra-sonic waves and strobe lights to induce acute discomfort, sickness, disorientation and sometimes epilepsy."

== See also ==
- Air safety
- National Transportation Safety Board
- Mind machine
