= Jabulani Sibanda =

Zimbabwean politician

The Honourable Jabulani Sibanda Sen.

Presidentially-appointed Senator
- Incumbent
- Assumed office 18 August 2026
- President: Emmerson Mnangagwa

Chairman Zimbabwe National Liberation War Veterans Association (ZNLWVA)
- In office 2001–2014
- Succeeded by: Chris Mutsvangwa

Personal details
- Born: Southern Rhodesia
- Party: ZANU-PF
- Occupation: Politician

Jabulani Sibanda is a Senator in the Parliament of Zimbabwe and the former chairman of Zimbabwe National Liberation War Veterans Association (ZNLWVA), an organisation originally comprising all the veterans that fought during the Second Chimurenga or Zimbabwe War of Liberation which ended in 1979, although he took no part in the war. Under his leadership the ZNLWVA mobilised War Veterans and other ZANU PF sympathisers in the forced and often violent appropriation of farmland they claimed to have been stolen during colonisation. He was expelled from ZANU-PF in 2014 for being part of the Joice Mujuru led Zanu pf faction.

== 2008 general election ==
=== Robert Mugabe endorsement ===
Despite the fact that he was expelled and therefore not a member of ZANU-PF, Sibanda, together with his ally Joseph Chinotimba, led "million-men" marches across the country to endorse President Robert Mugabe as the candidate for ZANU-PF in the March 2008 presidential election. Jabulani was inducted as chairman of the war veterans with blessing from Mugabe. Mugabe at one time wanted Jabulani to be Matebeleland ZANU-PF chairman, an influential position, but heavyweights in the region refused to acquiesce to this.

=== Simba Makoni candidacy ===
Jabulani Sibanda, in his capacity as the chairman of the war veterans association, indicated that the former guerillas would go back into the bush if Mugabe lost the 2008 presidential election to Morgan Tsvangirai.

=== Expulsion and arrest ===
Jabulani Sibanda was expelled from Zanu PF and ousted as leader of the ZNLWVA at the end of 2014 because of his apparent allegiance to beleaguered Vice President Joice Mujuru. He was succeeded by the outspoken Chris Mutsvangwa as the chairman of war veterans. He denounced Mugabe for trying to manipulate ZANU-PF structures into endorsing his hidden motives of having his wife, Grace Mugabe, as his successor. JB as he is affectionately known was openly opposed to it and denounced it as a "bedroom coup".

== See also ==
- Robert Mugabe
- ZANU-PF
