= Murambinda =

- Location within Zimbabwe
- Coordinates: 19°16′12″S 31°39′00″E
- Country: Zimbabwe
- Province: Manicaland
- District: Buhera District
- City: Murambinda Municipality
- Elevation: 995 m (3,264 ft)

Population (2004 Estimate)
  - Total: 3,383
- Time zone: UTC+1 (CET)
  - Summer (DST): UTC+1 (CEST)
- Climate: BSh

Murambinda is a town in Zimbabwe.

== Location ==
It is located in Buhera District, Manicaland Province, in eastern Zimbabwe. Its location is approximately 140 kilometres (87 mi), by road, southwest of Mutare, the location of the provincial headquarters. The village of Buhera, where the district headquarters is located, lies about 30 kilometres (19 mi), by road further southwest of Murambinda. The town of Chivhu (pop:10,370), the nearest large town, lies approximately 104 kilometres (65 mi), by road, northwest of Murambinda. The coordinates of Murambinda are: 19° 16' 12.00"S, 31° 39' 0.00"E (Latitude:-19.2700; Longitude:31.6500). Murambinda sits at an altitude of 3,264 feet (995 m), above sea level.

== Overview ==
The town of Murambinda is one of the only two designated urban areas in Buhera District; the other being Birchenough Bridge. There is a school in town, Murambinda School, and a missionary hospital, Murambinda Mission Hospital (MMH), both administered by the Sisters of the Little Company of Mary, under the auspices of the Roman Catholic Archdiocese of Harare. The hospital, founded in 1968, also functions as the District Hospital for the nearly 300,000 district inhabitants. There is a nurses training school, affiliated with MMH, adjacent to the hospital.

== History ==
The town is sometimes referred to as Murambinda Growth Point. "Growth Points" are centres that have been set aside and are subsidised by government, to develop urban centers in predominantly rural settings. The Growth Points are expected to establish urban residential areas, small and medium enterprises (SMEs), and light industry.

== Population ==
The current population of Murambinda is not publicly known. In 2004, the population of the town was estimated at 3,383 people. The next national census in Zimbabwe is scheduled from 18 August 2012 through 28 August 2012.

== Notable People from Murambinda ==
- Mugove Machaka (Computer Programmer) LinkedIn
- Farai .S. Ndawana (Big Data Principal Architect)
- Bianca Bondayi
- Zivai Mupambirei
- Purpose Makanyisa

== See also ==
- Districts of Zimbabwe
- Provinces of Zimbabwe
- Geography of Zimbabwe
