= Joseph Chinotimba =

Zimbabwean political figure

Vice-Chairman Zimbabwe National Liberation War Veterans Association (ZNLWVA)

Personal details
- Born: 23 March 1958 (age 68) Southern Rhodesia
- Party: ZANU-PF
- Occupation: Politician
- Profession: Security guard

Joseph Chinotimba (born 23 March 1958) is a Zimbabwean political figure. He rose to prominence during the invasions of white-owned commercial farms that started after the 2000 constitutional referendum in Zimbabwe. He is widely regarded as a militant ZANU-PF cadre with unquestionable allegiance to the old guard of the ruling party. He is the national vice-chairman of the Zimbabwe National Liberation War Veterans Association.

== Background ==
Chinotimba joined the Zimbabwe liberation struggle in the 1970s and was trained in Mozambique, Tanzania and Romania. He was demobilised from the army at Zimbabwe's independence in 1980 and joined the Harare City Council where he worked as a security guard for the Harare City Council before 2000. He joined the police section of the Municipal Council in 1982 and eventually became chief inspector.

== Farm invasions ==
Joseph Chinotimba is credited with spearheading the violent invasions of commercial farms in Zimbabwe, in collaboration with his mentor and ally, Dr. Chenjerai Hunzvi. In 2006 it was reported that Chinotimba 'allocated' himself a plot of land in the western suburb of Mabelreign along Clevering Road and built himself a house. The land was always traditionally held for the construction of churches. In 2007 during 'Operation Murambatsvina', construction of the house was delayed but the structure was spared and is now his official residence.

== Political activities ==
He has led the Zimbabwe Federation of Trade Unions, a grouping that was formed to counter the influence of the restive Zimbabwe Congress of Trade Unions (ZCTU).

in June 2003 he contested the Highfield parliamentary seat but lost. During the parliamentary elections of 2005, Chinotimba ran again, for the Highfield seat. Reports indicated that he tried to buy votes by giving voters money and food. He lost the seat.

=== The courts ===
At one time, war veterans led by Joseph Chinotimba invaded the Supreme Court to influence decisions regarding the land question.

=== 2007 Robert Mugabe endorsement ===
Chinotimba, together with his close ally Jabulani Sibanda, led million-men marches across the country in the run-up to the ZANU-PF congress of December 2007 designed to endorse Robert Mugabe as the only candidate suitable to represent the party in the 2008 presidential election. Mugabe was nominated as the ZANU-PF candidate at the congress.

== 2008 parliamentary election ==
In late 2007, Chinotimba announced his intention to contest the Buhera South constituency, a seat that Kumbirai Kangai had held since 1980, in the March 2008 parliamentary election. Popular musician Alick Macheso was among others who joined Chinotimba to bolster his prospects of winning the seat.

Chinotimba was successful in being nominated by ZANU-PF as its 2008 candidate for the Buhera South constituency. However, in the election he was defeated by Nemadziva Naison of the Movement for Democratic Change, receiving 7,613 votes against 8,833 for Naison.

On 20 May 2008, SW Radio Africa reported that Chinotimba led a militia group to murder Chokuse Mupango, popularly known as Nyoka, the election strategist for Nemadziva Naison, who was beaten and stabbed to death.. Chinotimba's car was used to ferry Nyoka to Mutiusinazita Clinic and then to Birchenough Bridge Mortuary where Chinotimba and his accomplices disguised Nyoka as a slain ZANU-PF supporter. Chinotimba made sure that Nyoka's body was not collected and when it was later collected he made sure that no post-mortem was carried out on the body by first of all instilling fear into the hearts of some of Nyoka's militant sons.

Chinotimba resigned as chief inspector of the municipal police at the Harare City Council in July 2008 to concentrate on his work in politics and business.
