= Odzi River =

River in Zimbabwe

Coordinates: 19°46′24″S 32°23′26″E

The Save River basin with the Odzi (center top)

The Odzi River is a tributary of the Save River in Zimbabwe. It joins the Save at Nyanyadzi. It is dammed at Osborne Dam.

The Odzani River is a westward-flowing tributary of the Odzi, rising near Penhalonga north of the city of Mutare. The Odzani and Smallbridge dams on the Ozani are part of the water-supply system for the city of Mutare. Odzani Dam, constructed in 1967, created Lake Alexander.
