= George Charamba =

Zimbabwean politician

Press Secretary President's Office (Zimbabwe)
- Incumbent
- Assumed office 2000
- President: Robert Mugabe

Permanent Secretary Ministry of Information (Zimbabwe)
- In office 2000–2018

Personal details
- Born: 4 April 1963 (age 63) Southern Rhodesia
- Party: ZANU-PF
- Spouse: Rudo Grace Charamba

George Charamba is the Deputy Chief Secretary-Presidential Communications in the Office of the President of Zimbabwe and former Permanent Secretary in the Ministry of Information of Zimbabwe. His position makes him the official spokesperson for President Emmerson Mnangagwa.

== Background ==
Charamba was appointed to Robert Mugabe's government following the elections of 2000. He is among a set of individuals not allowed to travel to the United States because the Department of the Treasury is of the opinion that they are "undermining democratic processes" in Zimbabwe.

== Press Secretary ==
Following the departure of Jonathan Moyo from the information ministry, Charamba became the de facto government spokesperson and Permanent Secretary (Perm Sec) of the Ministry, usurping the powers of Sikhanyiso Ndlovu. He regularly appears in the government media denouncing the opposition parties, dismissing them as inspired and backed by Western powers. He declared that the "West could go hang a thousand times" in response to Western criticism of Mugabe's re-election.

In 2018, newly elected as President, Emmerson Mnangagwa appointed Nick Mangwana to replace George Charamba as Information and Broadcasting Services Perm Sec.
