= Save River (Africa) =

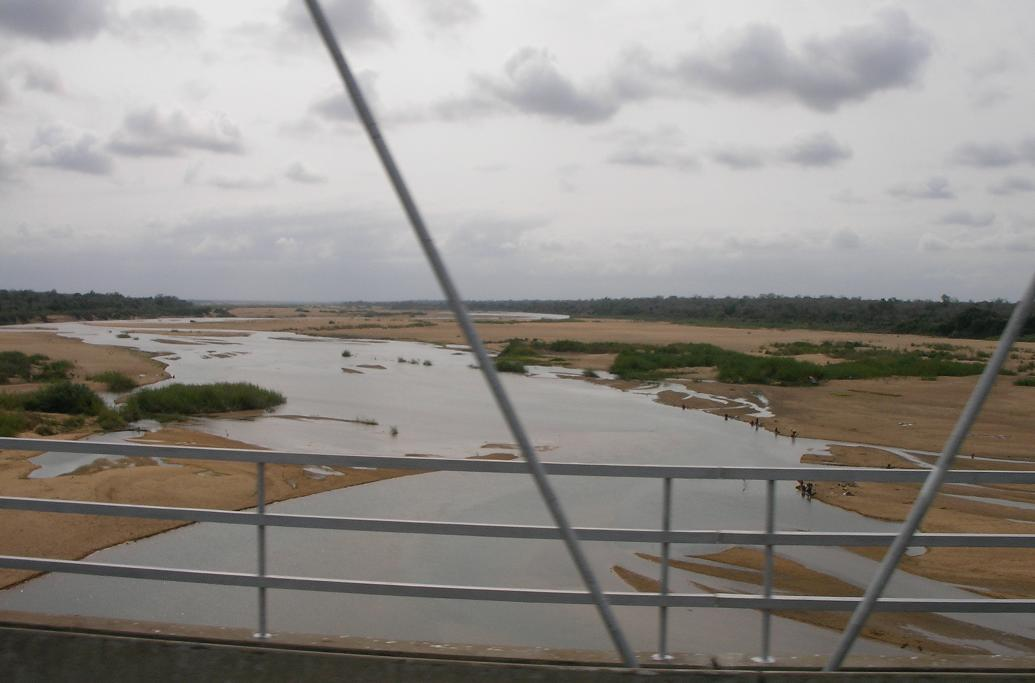
- A view of the Save in Mozambique

- The Save River basin

Location
- Country: Zimbabwe, Mozambique

Physical characteristics
- Source
  - location: South of Harare, Zimbabwe
  - coordinates: 18°39′0″S 31°7′15″E
  - elevation: 1,470 m (4,820 ft)
- Mouth
  - location: Indian Ocean
  - coordinates: 20°54′15.01″S 35°3′45.91″E
  - elevation: 0 m (0 ft)
- Length: 640 km (400 mi) to 740 km (460 mi)
- Basin size: 106,420 km^{2} (41,090 sq mi) to 116,100 km^{2} (44,800 mi^{2})
- Discharge
  - location: Indian Ocean (near mouth)
  - average: (Period: 1979–2015) 13.8 km^{3}/a (440 m^{3}/s) (Period: 1971–2000)438 m^{3}/s (15,500 cu ft/s)
- Discharge
  - location: Vila France do Save (Basin size: 100,885 km^{2} (38,952 sq mi)
  - average: (Period: 1976–1979)503 m^{3}/s (17,800 cu ft/s)
  - minimum: 6.4 m^{3}/s (230 cu ft/s)
  - maximum: 3,022 m^{3}/s (106,700 cu ft/s)

Basin features
- River system: Save River
- Tributaries
  - left: Macheke, Odzi
  - right: Devuli, Turgwe, Runde, Coe

The Save River or Sabi River (Portuguese: Rio Save) is a 640 km (400 mi) river of southeastern Africa, flowing through Zimbabwe and Mozambique. The river has its source in Zimbabwe, some 80 km (50 mi) south of Harare, then flows south and then east, from the Zimbabwean highveld to its confluence with the Odzi River. It then turns south, drops over the Chivirira ("Place of Boiling") Falls, and flows down the western side of Zimbabwe's Eastern Highlands, forming a dry river valley in the rain shadow of these mountains. It is joined by the Runde River or Lundi at the Mozambique border, forming a dramatic confluence at Mahenya. It then crosses Mozambique to flow into the Indian Ocean at about 21°S.

The Save River provided irrigation for sugar plantation, but now supports the cultivation of citrus, cotton, rice, and wheat. It is also a source of small-scale fishing for the local population.

It divides Mozambique administratively, politically, ethnically and ecologically:

- During the colonial era, the administrative units of the area south of the Save changed over time, but the longer lasting were the districts of Gaza and Inhambane; presently, the Save separates the provinces of Gaza and Inhambane to the south, from those of Manica and Sofala to the north:
- Politically, the "south-of-the-Save" can be considered the stronghold of Frelimo, while the region immediately to the north is, in general, more supportive of Renamo;
- The Save separates the ethnic groups that are native speakers of Shangaan (or Xi-Tsonga), to the south, from those that speak languages of the Shona group in the north;
- Ecologically, as the Save flows into the Indian Ocean, its mouth corresponds to the separation of tropical marine ecosystems, to the north, from the subtropical; the terrestrial ecosystems show less variation along the coastal plain north and south of the river, but inland where the Chimanimani Mountains start, a montane forest develops, which is completely different from the forests found in the south.

The delta of the Save River includes mangrove forests which span approximately 100 km (62 mi) on the Indian Ocean coast. Villagers in the delta basin use the mangrove forests for timber and small-scale fishing. The ecology of the lower Save River basin has been affected by cyclones, flooding, erosion, coastal flood and tsunamis.

Historically it was a transport route for gold and trade goods between the coast and the hinterland occupied by the civilisation of Great Zimbabwe in the 13th and 14th centuries AD.
