= List of kidnappings (2020–present) =

The following is a list of kidnappings that occurred from 2020 onward, summarizing the events of each case, including instances of celebrity abductions, claimed hoaxes, suspected kidnappings, extradition abductions, and mass kidnappings.

== List ==
Date	Victim	Abductor	Location	Age of victim	Outcome	Notes
10 February 2020	Faye Swetlik	Coty Scott Taylor	Cayce, South Carolina, U.S.	6	Murdered	Six-year-old Faye Swetlik disappeared on 10 February 2020 and was found murdered three days later. On the same day her body was found, a man named Coty Scott Taylor committed suicide and Swetlik's DNA was found in his house. Police concluded that Taylor had killed Swetlik hours after abducting her.
April 2020	Yohanah Kilus	Islamic State – West Africa Province	Borno State, Nigeria	Unknown	Murdered	A Nigerian policeman Inspector Yohanah Kilus or Johanah James and Nigerian soldier Lance Corporal Emannuel Oscar were abducted between Maiduguri and Monguno. They were both executed on video on 11 April.
April 2020	Emannuel Oscar	Islamic State – West Africa Province	Borno State, Nigeria	Unknown	Murdered	A Nigerian policeman Inspector Yohanah Kilus or Johanah James and Nigerian soldier Lance Corporal Emannuel Oscar were abducted between Maiduguri and Monguno. They were both executed on video on 11 April.
May 2020	Cecilia Chimbiri	Zimbabwean government officers	Zimbabwe	Unknown	Released	MDC members who were abducted for two days after an anti-government protest, where they were allegedly tortured and sexually abused by government officers.
May 2020	Joanah Mamombe	Zimbabwean government officers	Zimbabwe	26	Released	MDC members who were abducted for two days after an anti-government protest, where they were allegedly tortured and sexually abused by government officers.
May 2020	Netsai Marova	Zimbabwean government officers	Zimbabwe	25	Released	MDC members who were abducted for two days after an anti-government protest, where they were allegedly tortured and sexually abused by government officers.
8 June 2020	Ishaku Yakubu	Islamic State – West Africa Province	Borno State, Nigeria	Unknown	Murdered	Four Christian Nigerian Aid workers, Ishaku Yakubu of Action Against Hunger, Luka Filibus (31) of the International Rescue Committee, Abdulrahman Dungus of the REACH International Initiative, Abdur-Rahman Bulama a camp manager for the State Emergency Management Agency, and Joseph Prince a security guard working for the Alje Security Organization were abducted between Maiduguri and Magunon. A short quality of life video was released on 29 June, however 23 days later the captors released a video showing the execution of the five men.
8 June 2020	Luka Filibus	Islamic State – West Africa Province	Borno State, Nigeria	31	Murdered	
8 June 2020	Abdulrahman Dungus	Islamic State – West Africa Province	Borno State, Nigeria	28	Murdered	
8 June 2020	Abdur-Rahman Bulama	Islamic State – West Africa Province	Borno State, Nigeria	late 30's	Murdered	
8 June 2020	Joseph Prince	Islamic State – West Africa Province	Borno State, Nigeria	Unknown	Murdered	
2 July 2020	Patricia Alatorre	Armando Cruz	Bakersfield, California, U.S.	13	Murdered	Alatorre disappeared on 1 July around 11:30 p.m., with Bakersfield Police Department believing that she was a runaway until surveillance footage showed a pickup truck at the area. The police connected the truck to 24-year-old Armando Cruz from Inglewood, California, who pleaded guilty to raping and murdering Alatorre.
9 September 2020	Óscar Denis	Paraguayan People's Army	Concepción, Paraguay	73	Unknown	A Paraguayan politician and former Vice President of the nation. He was kidnapped on 9 September by the Paraguayan People's Army, who formally claimed responsibility for the kidnapping two days later. His fate ultimately remains unknown.
15 November 2020	Kum Avantika	Childless couple	Hyderabad, Telangana, India	3	Rescued	Avantika was abducted as she travelled with her family on a bus to Bellary. She was rescued approximately 20 hours after her abduction. The motive for her kidnapping was the fact that her abductors had no children of their own.
14 December 2020	Unnamed 12 year old girl	Nathan Larson	Denver, Colorado, USA	12	Rescued	On December 14, 2020, Larson was arrested at Denver International Airport on felony charges of attempted kidnapping, child abduction, soliciting child pornography from a minor, and meeting a child for the intention of sex, along with a misdemeanor charge of harboring a minor.
3 March 2021	Sarah Everard	Wayne Couzens	London, England, UK	33	Murdered	Everard disappeared in South London while walking home to Brixton Hill. Six days later, police officer Wayne Couzens was arrested on suspicion of kidnapping and later murdering Everard. Everard's remains were found in Hoad's Wood in a large builder's bag and identified via dental records. Couzens pleaded guilty to kidnapping and raping Everard, and eventually admitted killing her.
11 March 2021	38–39 students from the Federal College of Forestry Mechanization	Unknown bandits, Isayku Boderi (alleged)	Afaka, Igabi, Kaduna State, Nigeria	17+	Released	Armed bandits entered the school around 9 p.m. local time; residents ignored the sound of gunfire, assuming it was from training at a nearby military academy. A distress call was sent from the school and the Nigerian Armed Forces based in the nearby academy engaged the bandits in a firefight. One hundred and eighty staff and students were able to be rescued by the next morning. The bandits were successful in kidnapping and moving 38 to 39 students. In early April 2021, ten of the students were released and by 5 May 2021, the remaining were as well. In February 2024, Isayku Boderi, whom the government alleged was responsible for the kidnapping, was killed by Nigerian Security Forces.
2 July 2021	Unnamed 6-year-old girl (identity withheld)	Robby Wildt	Louisville, Kentucky	6	Rescued	The unnamed child was kidnapped by Wildt from outside her home. Neighbors who witnessed the crime called 911; one followed Wildt's vehicle and provided authorities with part of the abductor's license plate. As such, the child was rescued just minutes after her abduction. Wildt was later sentenced to 13 years' imprisonment for the kidnapping.
16 July 2021	Selsela Alikhil	Unknown	Islamabad, Pakistan	Unknown	Released	Daughter of the Afghan ambassador to Pakistan who was forcefully abducted and tortured by an attacker who picked her up in his taxi. She was later released, and her case is currently under investigation.
13 August 2021	Mariam Abdulrab	DeMarcus Brinkley	Atlanta, U.S.	27	Murdered	Bartender kidnapped from outside her home in Southeast Atlanta. Her body was discovered several hours later. Abdulrab's kidnapper, who had previously been convicted of child sexual abuse, plead guilty to her murder, kidnapping, attempted rape, and other charges.
20 August 2021	Queen Bakomi	Unidentified kidnapping gang	Balma, Adamawa State, Nigeria	Unknown	Rescued	On 20 August a gang of kidnappers stormed the residence of Bakomi Andarawus and killed him before abducting his daughter Queen. Queen was held for six days while the gang demanded two million naira in ransom. The kidnappers eventually conceded that this was an unrealistic amount and agreed to accept 170,000 in return for Queen's release. According to a police source, the kidnappers directed representatives of the family to take the money to a particular place in the bush for collection. However, a group of vigilantes who were lying in wait opened fire on the gang member who came to collect the ransom and killed him, rescuing Queen in the process.
16 October 2021	Cleo Smith	Terence Darrell Kelly	Gascoyne, Australia	4	Rescued	Smith disappeared from her family's tent at a campsite, and remained missing for 18 days until 3 November. She was found alive by police at Kelly's house after mobile phone evidence determined that he had visited the campsite. The kidnapper was sentenced to 13½ years in prison.
November 2021	Speedy Mashilo	Unknown hijackers	R568 road between Ekangala and KwaMhlanga	55	Released	Speedy Katisho Mashilo was kidnapped for a few hours in November 2021 by unknown hijackers who attempted to extort information from him. Mashilo was later let go.
20 November 2021	Bobbi-Anne McLeod	Cody Ackland	Plymouth, UK	18	Murdered	Bobbi-Anne McLeod was attacked at a bus stop by Cody Ackland, who beat her with a claw hammer, forced her into his car and drove her up to Dartmoor, where he beat her to death. The kidnapper plead guilty to murder.
12 December 2021	Kamarie Holland	Jeremy Tremaine Williams and Kristy Marie Siple	Columbus, Georgia, U.S.	5	Murdered	A five-year-old child abducted from her Columbus, Georgia, home on 12 December 2021, by Jeremy Williams. She was drugged, repeatedly sexually assaulted and murdered by strangulation in Phenix City, Alabama, on 13 December. The abduction and sexual assault was committed upon the agreement Holland's mother, Kristy Siple—who staged a child abduction scenario—would be paid $1,300 by Williams to engage in sex with the child. Siple was ultimately sentenced to 20 years' imprisonment; Williams was found guilty of four counts of capital murder. He is currently incarcerated on death row.
February 2022	"Yang"	Dong Zhimin	Feng County, Xuzhou, People's Republic of China	Unknown	Rescued	A mentally disturbed and unlawfully imprisoned young woman chained to a wall and who gave birth to eight children throughout the period of her captivity. Several conflicting statements have been issued by the Chinese Communist Party following her rescue, including the claim "Yang" was a beggar who had first encountered her abductor's father in 1998 and had subsequently married her abductor.
11 March 2022	Ivan Fedorov	Russian military officers	Melitopol, Ukraine	33	Released	Mayor of the Ukrainian town of Melitopol who was arrested on 11 March 2022, for supposed crimes committed against civilians in the Luhansk People's Republic. He was released five days later in exchange for nine Russian soldiers.
18 March 2022	Yevhenii "Yevhen" Bal	Russian soldiers	Mariupol, Ukraine	78	Released, but died from injuries	Yevhenii "Yevhen" Bal was a retired naval officer and captain in the Northern Fleet and Pacific Fleet he was also a journalist, writer and member of the National Writers' Union of Ukraine. On March 18 Russian soldiers broke into his home in Mariupol and held him captive for having photos of him with Ukrainian soldiers and his membership of NWUU. The soldiers would brutally beat him for three days, releasing him on March 21 they then told Bal "We are not at war with veterans of the USSR Navy." Bal would never recover from his injuries and would die on April 2 five days before his 79th birthday, as a direct result of the injuries he sustained during his captivity.
27 March 2022	Oleksandr Kryvenko	Russian soldier	Bucha, Ukraine	75	Murdered	Oleksandr Kryvenko was the head of a modeling club, on the 27th of March, an intoxicated Russian soldier held him at gunpoint and forced him out of his house on Turgenev Street; the soldier then forced Kryvenko to ask his neighbors for alcohol, at one of the houses the soldier shot and killed Kryvenko.
28 March 2022	62 passengers	Nigerian bandits	Katari, Kaduna State, Nigeria	Various	Various	62 passengers were abducted in the Abuja–Kaduna train attack.
25 April 2022	Brandon Cuellar	Yesenia Guadalupe Ramirez and Jose Roman Portillo	San Jose, California, U.S.	3 months	Rescued	Cuellar was alone in his family apartment for a few minutes while his grandmother unloaded groceries. Jose Roman Portillo snatched the baby and walked out. Cuellar was found the next day safe after a 20-hour search. Ramirez, who had been faking a pregnancy, and Portillo plead guilty to the kidnapping.
c. 2 August 2022	Hamed Sabouri	Unknown, allegedly Taliban militants	Kabul, Afghanistan	22	Murdered	A gay man, 22, Sabouri's killing took place amid increasing violence against sexual minorities in Afghanistan in the aftermath of the Fall of Kabul and the Taliban takeover of the country. Controversy surrounding the case included Western media's coverage and a legal case in England and Wales against The Guardian.
3 October 2022	Amandeep Singh	Unknown	Merced, California, U.S.	39	Murdered	A family of three and the uncle were kidnapped from a central California business. A suspect was arrested in connection with the kidnapping as their whereabouts were unknown, but they were found dead.
3 October 2022	Jasdeep Singh	Unknown	Merced, California, U.S.	36	Murdered	A family of three and the uncle were kidnapped from a central California business. A suspect was arrested in connection with the kidnapping as their whereabouts were unknown, but they were found dead.
3 October 2022	Jasleen Kaur	Unknown	Merced, California, U.S.	27	Murdered	A family of three and the uncle were kidnapped from a central California business. A suspect was arrested in connection with the kidnapping as their whereabouts were unknown, but they were found dead.
3 October 2022	Arrohi Dheri	Unknown	Merced, California, U.S.	8 months	Murdered	A family of three and the uncle were kidnapped from a central California business. A suspect was arrested in connection with the kidnapping as their whereabouts were unknown, but they were found dead.
14 October 2022	Lola Daviet	Dahbia Benkired	19th arrondissement, Paris, France	12	Murdered	Daviet was a 12-year-old schoolgirl murdered by 24-year-old Dahbia Benkired. She was lured into Benkired's sister's apartment, sexually assaulted, then asphyxiated. Her body was discovered in a travel trunk the same evening.
30 November 2022	Athena Strand	Tanner Horner	Paradise, Texas, United States	7	Murdered	Athena Strand was a seven-year-old girl kidnapped and strangled to death by a delivery driver Tanner Horner. Horner pleaded guilty to capital murder and was sentenced to death in 2026.
7 February 2023	Phillip Mark Mehrtens	TPNPB-OPM	Paro, Nduga Regency, Indonesia	37	Released	A pilot from Christchurch, New Zealand, Philip Mehrtens was held hostage by members of the TPNPB-OPM led by Egianus Kogoya. They took him and his five passengers, who were all native Nduga, from a small landing strip in Paro, shortly after landing his plane, they stormed the plane and set it on fire, the militants then released the five passengers, and took Mehrtens to several unknown locations. Mehrtens was held hostage for 592 days, having been released on 21 September 2024 when the Indonesian government reached an agreement with Kogoya and the TPNPB-OPM.
7 February 2023	Demanus Gwijangge	TPNPB-OPM	Paro, Nduga Regency, Indonesia	Unknown	Released	
7 February 2023	Minda Gwijangge	TPNPB-OPM	Paro, Nduga Regency, Indonesia	Unknown	Released	
7 February 2023	Pelenus Gwijangge	TPNPB-OPM	Paro, Nduga Regency, Indonesia	Unknown	Released	
7 February 2023	Meita Gwijangge	TPNPB-OPM	Paro, Nduga Regency, Indonesia	Unknown	Released	
7 February 2023	Wetina W.	TPNPB-OPM	Paro, Nduga Regency, Indonesia	Unknown	Released	
16 March 2023	Unnamed infant	Unnamed couple	Canton, Ohio	3 weeks	Rescued	The three-week-old infant girl was abducted from her family home by a 31-year-old woman posing as a Child Protective Services worker. The child was rescued approximately 16 hours later, on 17 March. Her abductor and an alleged 21-year-old male accomplice were arrested.
13 April 2023	Đường Văn Thái	State agents of Vietnam	Thailand	Unknown	Imprisoned	Đường was abducted from his home in Pathum Thani province, Thailand, allegedly by state agents of Vietnam. He later appeared in custody in Vietnam, where he was sentenced to twelve years' imprisonment on charges of publishing anti-state propaganda in a Hanoi court.
4 July 2023	Thuzar Maung	Unknown	Selangor, Malaysia	c. 46	Unknown	A Burmese refugee activist. Maung, her husband and their three children were abducted from their home. In October 2025, Burmese authorities confirmed that the family were in their custody.
July 2023	Yanfei Bao	Tingjun Chao	Christchurch, New Zealand	44	Murdered	Real estate agent Bao was last seen on 19 July 2023 in the suburb of Hornby, Christchurch. A 52-year-old man was arrested and charged with her kidnapping on 22 July 2023 at Christchurch Airport, after he purchased a one-way international flight. On 4 December 2024, Tingjun Chao was convicted of Bao's murder in the Christchurch High Court.
5 August 2023	Rachel Morin	Victor Martinez Hernandez	Maryland, USA	37	Murdered	On August 5, 2023, Morin was murdered while hiking along the Ma and Pa Trail in Bel Air, Maryland by illegal immigrant Victor Martinez Hernandez. He was sentenced to life in prison.
September 2023	Unnamed 17-year-old	3 unnamed people	Santa Maria, California	17	Rescued	The 3 perpetrators kidnapped the 17-year-old after a traffic collision and forced them into their vehicle. Over several days, they would ask for ransom through phone calls and videos sent to the victim's parents. Law enforcement was able to track the perpetrators through camera footage and vehicle identification and conducted a raid on September 22.
23 September 2023	Unnamed 15-year-old girl	Three males, including one minor	Churu, Rajasthan, India	15	Murdered	Student from Churu who disappeared on 23 September; her body was found in a well two days later. The student had been gang raped and murdered. Three males—one a minor—were arrested shortly thereafter.
30 September 2023	Charlotte Sena	Craig Nelson Ross Jr.	Moreau Lake State Park, New York	9	Rescued	Kidnapped while camping with her family. The suspect was identified with a fingerprint from a ransom note he left at the family home. The girl was found alive two days later in the suspect's camper, where she was being held in a cabinet.
7 October 2023	Noa Argamani	Hamas	Eshkol Regional Council, Israel	25	Rescued	Argamani was kidnapped from the Re'im music festival during the October 7 attacks; she was rescued by Israeli forces on 8 June 2024, after 245 days in captivity during the Nuseirat special operation..
7 October 2023	Avinatan Or	Hamas	Eshkol Regional Council, Israel	30	Released	Or was kidnapped from the Re'im music festival during the October 7 attacks; his girlfriend, Noa Argamani, was also kidnapped from the festival. He was released from Hamas on 13 October 2025, after 738 days in captivity.
7 October 2023	Romi Gonen	Hamas	Eshkol Regional Council, Israel	23	Released	Gonen was kidnapped from the Re'im music festival during the October 7 attacks; she was released by Hamas on 19 January 2025, after 471 days in captivity.
7 October 2023	Mia Schem	Hamas	Eshkol Regional Council, Israel	21	Released	A young Israeli woman and one of hundreds of Israeli citizens abducted by Hamas militants during the 2023 Hamas-led attack on Israel. Schem was released by her abductors on 30 November as part of a prisoner exchange.
7 October 2023	Elkana Bohbot	Hamas	Eshkol Regional Council, Israel	34	Released	Bohbot was abducted by Hamas from the at the Supernova music festival and held captive. He was released on October 13, 2025 after 738 days in captivity.
7 October 2023	Hersh Goldberg-Polin	Hamas	Eshkol Regional Council, Israel	23	Murdered	A 23-year-old American-Israeli abducted by Hamas militants from the Re'im music festival massacre. Goldberg-Polin is known to have been wounded prior to being taken captive. His body was recovered from a tunnel in Rafah in the Gaza Strip on 31 August 2024.
7 October 2023	Gadi Moshe Moses	Hamas	Nir Oz kibbutz, Israel	79	Released	Moses was an Israeli citizen who was abducted from his home by Islamic militants during the Nir Oz massacre on October 7, 2023. He was released in February 2025 as part of an agreement between Israel and Hamas, after 482 days in captivity.
7 October 2023	Bibas family	Hamas	Nir Oz kibbutz, Israel	34, 32, 4, 9 months	Murdered - Shiri (mother), Ariel (4 years old), Kfir (9 months) Released – Yarden (father)	An Israeli family of four abducted during the 2023 Hamas-led attack on Israel. The family patriarch, Yarden Bibas, was later released in a prisoner exchange during the January 2025 Gaza war ceasefire. The dead bodies of the rest of the family were turned over to Israel in February 2025, although their cause of death is disputed; Hamas claim that they were killed by an Israeli airstrike, but the Israeli government allege that forensics do not match this story and have accused Hamas of murdering them and mutilating their corpses.
7 October 2023	Nattapong Pinta	Hamas	Nir Oz kibbutz, Israel	c. 34	Murdered	One of 31 Thai nationals taken hostage during the October 7 attacks. His body was recovered by the IDF in June 2025, having been murdered while in captivity. The precise location of his murder is unknown.
7 October 2023	Edan Alexander	Hamas	Israel	19	Released	American-Israeli soldier who was the last known living American citizen held hostage by Hamas in the Gaza war hostage crisis.
16 December 2023	Fredrick Mwenengabo	Unknown	Goma, Democratic Republic of the Congo	48-49	Released	Frederick Mwenengabo, a Congolese-Canadian anthropologist and human rights activist who immigrated to Fredericton, New Brunswick in 2009, was kidnapped while visiting family members in the DRC. He was held for over five months until being released to the Congolese National Intelligence Agency. He returned to Fredericton on 1 June 2024.
19 February 2024	Joshlin Smith	Racquel Smith	Saldanha Bay, South Africa	6	Unknown	Joshlin Smith disappeared from Saldanha Bay in February 2024. She was last seen with her mother, Racquel "Kelly" Smith, being driven away in a car by an unidentified woman. Prosecutors later accused Kelly Smith of selling her daughter to a sangoma, who had allegedly wanted her for her eyes and skin. Kelly Smith, her boyfriend Jacquen Appollis, and their friend Steveno van Rhyn were convicted of kidnapping and human trafficking in May 2025.
7 March 2024	312 schoolchildren, at least one teacher	Unknown bandits	Kuriga, Chikun, Kaduna State, Nigeria	8–15 (students)	Returned (312 students) Died (1 student and 1 teacher)	Dozens of armed men on motorcycles attacked a local school assembly with primary and secondary students. The school officials reported 280 students kidnapped, while witnesses put the number at 312. The captors demanded a ransom of $690,000. 25 students were later released. On 17 March 2024, the army announced the release of 137 more children. Despite the discrepancy in numbers, officials said all of the kidnapped were freed.
8 June 2024	Yeri Bocoum	Malian state security services	Mali	Unknown	Released	A Malian journalist and vice-president of the Association of Social Media Professionals and Web Actors (APMSWA). Bocoum was kidnapped from outside his Kati home by unknown individuals; he was freed on 27 June.
13 June 2024	Erin Brunnett	Daniel Callihan and Victoria Cox	Mississippi, U.S.	4	Murdered	Daniel Callihan kidnapped the two girls after brutally murdering their mother Callie Brunnett in New Orleans, Louisiana. The two girls were driven to Mississippi, where they were eventually found. The youngest, Erin, was killed. Her sister, Jalie, was taken in intensive care. It was discovered that both girls had been raped. Both Callihan and Victoria Cox, who was also responsible for the girls' kidnapping, were eventually arrested and charged.
13 June 2024	Jalie Brunnett	Daniel Callihan and Victoria Cox	Mississippi, U.S.	6	Rescued	Daniel Callihan kidnapped the two girls after brutally murdering their mother Callie Brunnett in New Orleans, Louisiana. The two girls were driven to Mississippi, where they were eventually found. The youngest, Erin, was killed. Her sister, Jalie, was taken in intensive care. It was discovered that both girls had been raped. Both Callihan and Victoria Cox, who was also responsible for the girls' kidnapping, were eventually arrested and charged.
17 October 2024	Elliot Eastman	Unknown	Sibuco, Zamboanga del Norte, Philippines	26 years old	Unknown	Elliot Onil Eastman, a 26-year-old American vlogger-content creator from Vermont living with his wife in the Philippines was abducted for ransom from his in-laws' house in Sitio Tungawan, Barangay Poblacion, Sibuco by four assailants armed with M16 rifles posing as police. While engaging the kidnappers, he suffered a gunshot wound to the leg and transported away by motorboat.
20 November 2024	Mushtaq Khan	Lavi Pal and Arjun Karnwal	Delhi, India	54 years old	Escaped	Khan was invited by the kidnappers in the pretext of an award show in Meerut. According to his business partner, he was misled into a car upon arriving in Delhi and taken to a remote location near Bijnor, where he was tortured for 12 hours. He managed to escape after hearing the morning Azaan and sought help from locals.
11 January 2025	Eva Gretzmacher	Islamic State – Sahel Province	Agadez, Niger	73 years old	Unknown	Gretzmacher who was an Austrian development worker was abducted from her home in Agadez by ISSP subcontractors.
14 January 2025	Navarro Giane Gilbert	Islamic State – Sahel Province	Ahaggar National Park, Algeria	Unknown	Rescued	A Spanish tourist Navarro Giane Gilbert was abducted at the Assekrem plateau in the Ahaggar National Park by up to five Algerian and Malian rebels who hoped to sell Gilbert to ISSP. Gilbert was freed by the Azawad Liberation Front a week later on 21 January in the Ménaka Region.
29 March 2025	Anson Que	Identified	Rodriguez, Rizal, Philippines	Unknown	Murdered	Filipino-Chinese businessman Guo Congyuan and his driver Armanie Pabillo were found dead along a roadside after being kidnapped.
29 March 2025	Armanie Pabillo	Identified	Rodriguez, Rizal, Philippines	Unknown	Murdered	Filipino-Chinese businessman Guo Congyuan and his driver Armanie Pabillo were found dead along a roadside after being kidnapped.
13 April 2025	Claudia Abbt	Islamic State – Sahel Province	Agadez, Niger	63 years old	Unknown	Claudia Abbt, a Lebanon born Swiss immigrant and community worker, was abducted from her home in Agadez by ISSP subcontractors.
25 April 2025	Sanjay Mahto	Islamic State – Sahel Province (suspected)	Kandadji, Niger	Unknown	Released	Suspected ISSP militants attacked a worksite near the Kandadji Dam, they abducted five Indian workers and a local worker. The same militants had killed 12 soldiers in nearby Sakoira the day prior. The local worker Adam was released the same day while the other five were released in early January 2026 after a successful negotiation.
25 April 2025	Faljit Mahto	Islamic State – Sahel Province (suspected)	Kandadji, Niger	Unknown	Released	Suspected ISSP militants attacked a worksite near the Kandadji Dam, they abducted five Indian workers and a local worker. The same militants had killed 12 soldiers in nearby Sakoira the day prior. The local worker Adam was released the same day while the other five were released in early January 2026 after a successful negotiation.
25 April 2025	Rajkumar Mahto	Islamic State – Sahel Province (suspected)	Kandadji, Niger	Unknown	Released	Suspected ISSP militants attacked a worksite near the Kandadji Dam, they abducted five Indian workers and a local worker. The same militants had killed 12 soldiers in nearby Sakoira the day prior. The local worker Adam was released the same day while the other five were released in early January 2026 after a successful negotiation.
25 April 2025	Chandrika Mahto	Islamic State – Sahel Province (suspected)	Kandadji, Niger	Unknown	Released	Suspected ISSP militants attacked a worksite near the Kandadji Dam, they abducted five Indian workers and a local worker. The same militants had killed 12 soldiers in nearby Sakoira the day prior. The local worker Adam was released the same day while the other five were released in early January 2026 after a successful negotiation.
25 April 2025	Uttam Mahto	Islamic State – Sahel Province (suspected)	Kandadji, Niger	Unknown	Released	Suspected ISSP militants attacked a worksite near the Kandadji Dam, they abducted five Indian workers and a local worker. The same militants had killed 12 soldiers in nearby Sakoira the day prior. The local worker Adam was released the same day while the other five were released in early January 2026 after a successful negotiation.
25 April 2025	Adam	Islamic State – Sahel Province (suspected)	Kandadji, Niger	Unknown	Released	Suspected ISSP militants attacked a worksite near the Kandadji Dam, they abducted five Indian workers and a local worker. The same militants had killed 12 soldiers in nearby Sakoira the day prior. The local worker Adam was released the same day while the other five were released in early January 2026 after a successful negotiation.
25 May 2025	Olerato Mongale	Philangenkosi Sibongokuhle Makhanya	Lombardy, South Africa	30	Murdered	A South African woman kidnapped and murdered after being lured upon the pretense of a date. Her body was discovered in Lombardy the day after her disappearance.
25 May 2025	Olerato Mongale	Bongani Mthimkhulu	Lombardy, South Africa	30	Murdered	A South African woman kidnapped and murdered after being lured upon the pretense of a date. Her body was discovered in Lombardy the day after her disappearance.
4 June 2025	David Adenaiye	Boko Haram (suspected)	Oreke-Oke, Nigeria	Unknown	Unknown	Armed men attacked the Oreke-Okeigbo mining site, killing two police officers, Haruna Watsai and Tukur Ogah. The gunmen then abducted David Adenaiye a local worker and Sam Xie Wie a Chinese worker.
4 June 2025	Sam Xie Wie	Boko Haram (suspected)	Oreke-Oke, Nigeria	Unknown	Unknown	Armed men attacked the Oreke-Okeigbo mining site, killing two police officers, Haruna Watsai and Tukur Ogah. The gunmen then abducted David Adenaiye a local worker and Sam Xie Wie a Chinese worker.
15 July 2025	Ranjit Singh	Islamic State – Sahel Province	Dosso, Niger	Unknown	Unknown	Unknown gunmen attacked a worksite in Dosso, killing five locals and a Nigerien soldier, along with two Indian electricians Ganesh Karmali (39) and Krishna Kumar Gupta (36). They then abducted Indian electrician Ranjit Singh.
22 August 2025	Joseph Budna	Belizean police (suspected)	Orange Walk, Orange Walk, Belize	45	Imprisoned	Budna (a well-known social media personality in Belize) was kidnapped by three unidentified men, and found the next day in Guatemalan custody in Melchor, Peten. Budna alleged (and press leaks suggested) that his kidnappers were Belizean police officers.
21 October 2025	Kevin Rideout	Islamic State – Sahel Province	Niamey, Niger	48	Released	An American pilot who was working for the Christian humanitarian group Serving in Mission was abducted near the presidential palace in the city center of Niamey. Rideout was released in August 2026.
17 November 2025	25 schoolgirls	Unknown	Kebbi State, Nigeria	Unknown	Unknown	Gunmen attacked the Government Girls Comprehensive Secondary School in Maga town of the Kebbi State, killing the vice principal and the security guard as well as abducting 25 female students. Most of the kidnapped victims are Muslim. Later that same day, two of the girls and a teacher managed to escape from their abductors.
15 December 2025	Unnamed 11-year-old girl	Jerson Hartman	Vancouver, Washington, U.S.	11	Escaped	The victim of this attempted abduction was approached as she played soccer with friends; her kidnapping was foiled when she kicked the perpetrator in the groin and ran to safety. The perpetrator, Jerson Hartman (31), was later arrested and charged with second-degree attempted kidnapping and second-degree attempted robbery.
31 January 2026	Nancy Guthrie	Unknown	Catalina Foothills, Arizona, USA	84	Unknown	Nancy Guthrie, the American mother of Today co-anchor and NBC News journalist Savannah Guthrie, was kidnapped from her home in Catalina Foothills, Arizona. She has not been seen since.

== See also ==
- List of kidnappings (2010–2019)
- List of kidnappings (2000–2009)
- List of kidnappings
