= Olerato Mongale =

South African GBV Murder Victim

- Location: Gauteng, South Africa
- Date: 25 May 2025
- Attack type: Gender-based violence
- Victim: Olorato Mongale

Olorato Mongale (14 December 1994 – 25 May 2025) was a South African woman who was kidnapped and murdered in a case of gender-based violence. She was kidnapped and murdered after going on what she believed was a date. Her body was discovered in Lombardy, north of Johannesburg. She was last seen in the company of a man she had met a few days earlier at the Free State Mall. Police believe her murder was committed by a small organized crime ring, which had a pattern of kidnapping, robbing and killing young women. One of the suspects died in a shootout with police.

== Background ==
Olorato Mongale was born on 14 December 1994 in Bloemfontein, Free State province of South Africa. Mongale held a Bachelor of Journalism from Rhodes University and was a Golden Key Rhodes University New Member from 2013. She also held a Certificate to Teach English as a Foreign Language (CTEFL) and was a Communications and Engagement Specialist with an English programme in Daegu, South Korea. When she was murdered, Mongale was registered with the University of the Witwatersrand for LINK’s Master of Arts in ICT Policy and Regulation, which commenced in February 2025. The focus of her proposed research was ICT sustainability for economic growth, with specific interest in infrastructure access, digital literacy, and digital adoption. Mongale used to be a radio presenter at Motheo FM, as well as the communications officer in the Free State Department of Economic, Small Business Development, Tourism, and Environmental Affairs.

== Kidnapping and murder ==
Mongale was last seen on 25 May 2025. It was reported that CCTV footage showed her being picked up by a white Volkswagen Polo Vivo, which was fitted with false numberplates, going on a date with the suspected killer. After the South African Police Service launched a manhunt, her belongings, including a handbag, a wallet, and a cellphone, were found abandoned on Kew Road, Johannesburg. It was Mongale's phone that assisted in tracking her movements, after she shared her location with friends earlier before leaving for a date. Her body was discovered in Lombardy, north of Johannesburg.

== Tracking her killers ==
On 29 May 2025, police arrested an elderly man in connection with the murder of 30-year-old Olorato Mongale after investigations pointed out that the Volkswagen Polo car allegedly used in the crime and found in Phoenix in Durban was his. Traces of Mongale's blood were found in the car.

On 30 May 2025, one of the suspects was shot and killed in a shootout with the police in a residential complex in Amanzimtoti. Police later confirmed and identified him as one of the main suspects by the name of Philangenkosi Sibongokuhle Makhanya.

Fezile Ngubane, who was initially identified as a suspect in a syndicate targeting young women, was cleared. Ngubane was handed in by his father at the KwaMashu police station after he learnt that his son was sought by police in the Mongale murder case. The suspect who, as of 31 August 2025, is still on the run is Bongani Mthimkhulu from Zola. It is believed that he and Makhanya had been targeting women at various shopping centers across South Africa. They would kidnap, rob, and kill using the same white VW Polo, which is now part of the police's evidence in the investigations.

== Mongale as a journalist ==
When she was a journalist, one of the stories she covered was that of Karabo Mokoena — a young woman from Soweto who was murdered by her boyfriend, Sandile Mantsoe. Mokoena’s charred remains were found in Lyndhurst, Johannesburg, not far from where Mongale's were discovered.

== See also ==
- Murder of Karabo Mokoena
