= Darius Mutamba =

Darius Tawanda Mutamba
- Born: 27 December 1991 (age 34); Harare, Zimbabwe
- Education: Chinhoyi University of Technology
- Known for: creative art and photojournalism
- Notable work: "Silent Voices" (2014)
- Style: Chiaroscuro
- Movement: contemporary art

Darius Mutamba (born 1991) is a Zimbabwean conceptual visual artist, curator, journalist, and photojournalist. He is a journalist who has worked as a photojournalist for local news papers Daily News, Daily News on Sunday, and The Weekend Post. He also works as a production assistant for The Financial Gazette.

== Controversy ==
In June 2016 Mutamba curated a controversial photography exhibition in Harare entitled Object of Desire which focused on the nude human form. In support of his work he comments that nudity expresses "our common and universal element as humans." In 2014, his work Silent Voices, a collection of 15 black and white photographs on canvas depicting Zimbabwean children, was exhibited at the Harare International Festival of the Arts.
