= Kidnapping and killing of Anson Que =

2025 crime in the Philippines

- Location: Metro Manila and Rizal, Philippines
- Date: March 29, 2025– April 9, 2025
- Target: Congyuan Guo (Anson Que)
- Attack type: Kidnapping, murder by suffocation
- Deaths: 2

On April 9, 2025, the lifeless bodies of Filipino-Chinese businessman Guo Congyuan (Traditional Chinese: 郭從願, Simplified Chinese: 郭从愿) (also known as Anson Que or Anson Tan), and his driver Armanie Pabillo, were found along a roadside in Sitio Odiongan, Macabud, Rodriguez, Rizal. Their faces were wrapped in a duct tape and their bodies were crammed inside a nylon bag. Que, the owner of Elison Steel, was initially reported as being kidnapped while dining at a restaurant along Macapagal Boulevard, Pasay. However, subsequent investigations indicate that Que was last seen leaving his Valenzuela business en route to a meeting in Parañaque before vanishing without a trace. Despite the family of Que paying ransom three times for his release, which is estimated to be about ₱100 million ($1.75 million), he and his driver were still killed by their abductors.

The killing of Que and his driver has been condemned by three of the Philippines' largest business groups: the Philippine Chamber of Commerce and Industry (PCCI), Federation of Filipino Chinese Chambers of Commerce and Industry, Inc. (FFCCCII), and the Philippine Exporters Confederation (PhilExport) and was described as a "grotesque violation of humanity".

== Background ==
Anson Que, the owner of Elison Steel, and his driver, Armanie Pabillo, were reported as last seen on March 29 leaving their office in Valenzuela, en route to a meeting in Parañaque. However, they were initially reported as being kidnapped while dining in a seafood restaurant along Macapagal Boulevard, Pasay. Initial reports does not name the abducted businessman immediately, but was described as a friend of many members of the FFCCCII and supported many of its projects. He is also reported as a civic leader involved in philanthropic organizations.

On April 9, their bodies were found inside a nylon bag (rice sack) along a roadside in Sitio Odiongan, Macabud, Rodriguez, Rizal. Their faces were wrapped in duct tape. Que's Lexus LM350 was found abandoned in Bahay Toro, Quezon City. Residents reported that the van was left by two men wearing hoodies at around 4 p.m.. Following the abduction and death of Anson Que, newly promoted Brig. Gen. Elmer Ragay, the chief of the PNP Anti-Kidnapping Group (AKG), was relieved from his post. He was replaced by Police Colonel David Poklay, who served as the deputy director for operations of the Criminal Investigation and Detection Group (CIDG). However, Ragay was reinstated as AKG's acting director due to an election period regulation.

== Investigation ==
The Department of Justice (DOJ) said it is looking into POGO links in the kidnapping and killing of Anson Que. However, the family of Que denies his POGO links, stating that he is only engaged in legitimate businesses and is well known in the Filipino Chinese community, and that he prefers to stay away from shady dealings and only do business with people he knew and trusted.

The Justice Department will form an anti-kidnapping task force to address the lack of trust of the public towards government authorities following the incident. The task force is intended to facilitate the sharing of information between intelligence and law enforcement agencies. The DOJ also said a special court will be created to handle kidnapping cases. By April 11, PNP Chief Police General Rommel Marbil indicated that suspects in the killing of Anson Que and his driver Armanie Pabillo has been identified.

== See also ==
- List of kidnappings (2020–present)
