= Đường Văn Thái (journalist) =

Vietnamese journalist

- Citizenship: Vietnamese
- Occupation: Journalist

Đường Văn Thái is a Vietnamese journalist.

== Career ==
Đường created YouTube videos and social media posts criticizing the Vietnamese government and Communist Party of Vietnam. He fled to Thailand in 2018, where he was granted refugee status.

== 2023 abduction in Thailand ==
On 13 April 2023, Đường was abducted from his home in Pathum Thani province, Thailand. Human Rights Watch characterized his abduction as a kidnapping by state agents of Vietnam. He later appeared in custody in Vietnam, where he was sentenced to 12 years in prison on charges of publishing anti-state propaganda in a Hanoi court.

== See also ==
- List of kidnappings (2020–present)
- Trương Duy Nhất, Vietnamese journalist abducted from Thailand in 2019 and sentenced to prison in Vietnam
