= Death of Frances Rasuge =

South African murder victim

Frances Rasuge
- Born: 10 June 1977
- Disappeared: 27 August 2004 (aged 27); Temba, South Africa
- Occupation: Police constable

Frances Rasuge (born 10 June 1977; disappeared 27 August 2004) was a South African Police Services constable who was murdered by her boyfriend. She made headlines in South Africa after her disappearance, with her remains being found in March 2012 in her boyfriend's backyard, years after her boyfriend, William Nkuna, was convicted.

== Disappearance ==
Frances Rasuge disappeared in Temba on 27 August 2004, having been last seen in the company of her boyfriend, William Nkuna at a hairdressing salon. Blood belonging to Rasuge, which Nkuna maintained was menstrual blood, was found in Nkuna's car. Nkuna had earlier also withdrawn money from Rasuge's bank account and used her supposedly missing phone after she disappeared.

In November 2005, Judge Ronald Hendricks sentenced Nkuna, in the Mmabatho Circuit Court sitting in Ga-Rankuwa, to life imprisonment, though Rasuge's body had not been found.

On 20 March 2012, construction workers discovered human bones while laying a foundation at Nkuna's house. Almost a week later, Gauteng police announced that the DNA tests proved the remains were Rasuge's and she was buried on the 11 April 2012 in Honingnestkrans, Pretoria.

== See also ==
- Karabo Mokoena
- List of solved missing person cases (2000s)
