= David Simbi =

Zimbabwean academic

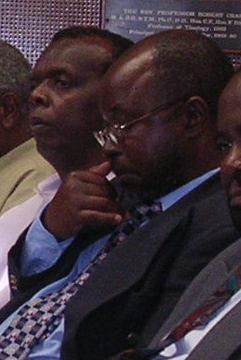
David Simbi (right) at a function at the University of Zimbabwe

David Simbi is a Zimbabwean engineer and a Professor of Corrosion Engineering. He is the Vice-Chancellor of the Chinhoyi University of Technology.

== Career ==
David Simbi is a distinguished scholar and professional metallurgical engineer who graduated with a Bachelor of Science (Hons) degree in applied chemistry from the University of Portsmouth (then Portsmouth Polytechnic) in 1981. He received his Doctor of Philosophy degree in metallurgy from the University of Leeds in 1985. After a short stint with the Zimbabwe Iron and Steel Company (1985 – 1988), Professor Simbi joined the University of Zimbabwe in August 1988 as a lecturer in the Department of Metallurgical Engineering. Professor Simbi has received numerous academic honours and awards and has also presented papers at local and international conferences.

Professor Simbi has served the Department of Metallurgical Engineering at the University of Zimbabwe as:

- Lecturer (1988 – 1993);
- Senior Lecturer (1994-2001);
- Associate Professor (2002-2004);
- Professor (2005 to date).

Over the years, Professor Simbi has served as external examiner at the University of Cape Town, Cape Peninsula University of Technology, University of Zambia, University of Namibia and the National University of Science and Technology (Zimbabwe).

As a professional metallurgical engineer, Professor Simbi is:

- A Fellow of the Zimbabwe Institution of Engineers;
- Fellow of Institute of Corrosion (UK);
- Chartered Engineer (Engineering Council, UK);
- Fellow of the Zimbabwe Academy of Sciences.

In recognition of his contribution in the development of the engineering profession in Zimbabwe, the Zimbabwe Institution of Engineers conferred Professor Simbi with a life Honorary Fellowship in 2008

Professor Simbi has administrative experience, serving as;

- Chairman of the Department of Metallurgical Engineering (1991-1994; 1996–1999);
- Deputy Dean (1997-1999; 2003)
- Dean of Engineering (2004 – 2005) at the University of Zimbabwe.

Professor Simbi represented the Faculty of Engineering at several committees of the University of Zimbabwe (Research Board, Open days, Teacher Education, Academic, Institute of Development Studies, Institute of Environmental Science, Budget (Sciences area) and Honorary Degrees).

He also served as Proctor (Faculty of Engineering: 1990–1994; 1996; 1998–1999).

In 2005, Professor Simbi was appointed Pro- Vice Chancellor of Chinhoyi University of Technology and ultimately Vice Chancellor in 2007.

Professor Simbi continues to work with the University of Zimbabwe in restoring programs in the Departments of Mining and Metallurgical Engineering. He has contributed to the development of engineering education nationally and internationally.
