= Human trafficking in Zimbabwe =

In 2019 Zimbabwe was a source, transit, and destination country for men, women, and children trafficked for the purposes of forced labor and sexual exploitation. Large scale migration of Zimbabweans to surrounding countries - as they fled a progressively more desperate situation at home - increased, and NGOs, international organizations, and governments in neighboring countries reported an upsurge in these Zimbabweans facing conditions of exploitation, including human trafficking. Rural Zimbabwean men, women, and children were trafficked internally to farms for agricultural labor and domestic servitude and to cities for domestic labor and commercial sexual exploitation. Women and children were trafficked for domestic labor and sexual exploitation, including in brothels, along both sides of the borders with Botswana, Mozambique, South Africa, and Zambia. Young men and boys were trafficked to South Africa for farm work, often laboring for months in South Africa without pay before "employers" have them arrested and deported as illegal immigrants. Young women and girls were lured to South Africa, the People's Republic of China, Egypt, the United Kingdom, the United States, and Canada with false employment offers that result in involuntary domestic servitude or commercial sexual exploitation. Men, women, and children from the Democratic Republic of the Congo, Malawi, Mozambique, and Zambia were trafficked through Zimbabwe en route to South Africa. Small numbers of South African girls were trafficked to Zimbabwe for domestic servitude. The government’s efforts to address trafficking at home have increased with the introduction of the National Action Plan (NAP) as well as the 2014 Trafficking in Persons Act. In addition, the trafficking situation in the country is worsening as more of the population is made vulnerable by declining socio-economic conditions.

The country ratified the 2000 UN TIP Protocol in December 2013.

U.S. State Department's Office to Monitor and Combat Trafficking in Persons placed Zimbabwe in "Tier 2" in 2019 and 2023.

In 2023, the Organised Crime Index gave the country a score of 5.50 out of 10 for human trafficking, noting that the worsening economic situation had led to increasing numbers of people being trafficked, especially to work in mines and construction.

== Definition ==
The Protocol to Prevent, Suppress, and Punish Trafficking in Persons, especially Women and Children, was adopted by the United Nations General Assembly in 2000 in order to define human trafficking. In circumstances such as human trafficking, definition is extremely important as in order to prosecute and charge those who are caught, their actions must fall directly under said law. This definition of human trafficking involves, "recruitment, transportation, transfer, harboring, or recipient of persons by the use of force or other means of coercion with the purpose of exploitation".

The protocol, one of three set by the UN called the Palermo Protocols, continues its definition of exploitation stating that it should include, "the exploitation of the prostitution of others or other forms of sexual exploitation, forced labour...slavery...the removal of organs...".

== Trafficking Report ==
The Trafficking in Persons Report (TIP) is a report that is issued annually by the Office to Monitor and Combat Trafficking in Persons department within the U.S. Government to hold foreign countries accountable for human trafficking issues. According to the 2019 Trafficking in Persons report, Zimbabwe is a Tier 2 country and the OMCTP placed the country on the "Tier 2 Watchlist" in 2019 and 2023. A Tier 2 country is a country that does not meet the minimum standards set by the TIP office, but is making efforts to do so. Zimbabwe was promoted to a Tier 2 from the previous year because of its efforts to combat human trafficking through increasing cooperation with certain NGOs in Africa to identify victims.

=== Prosecution ===
Zimbabwe has focused on shaping the law enforcement policies it currently has in place in order to cut down on human trafficking cases. While a few new laws have been passed since 2014, such as the 2014 Trafficking in Persons Act, the details and terms defined in these acts have made prosecution of human traffickers difficult. The government's anti-trafficking law enforcement efforts have been maintained since the previous report, and have made efforts to improve international case cooperation and case management. Zimbabwe does not prohibit all forms of trafficking in persons, though existing statutes outlaw forced labor and numerous forms of sexual exploitation. In 2014, the Zimbabwean government installed the 2014 Trafficking in Persons Act which was able to provide a definition of trafficking in persons, but was not able to define or criminalize "exploitation" as the UN requires countries to do so.

While it is not unusual for a detainee to remain in custody for prolonged periods - in some cases several years - before the case is heard in court, a three-month strike by magistrates, prosecutors, and court staff worsened the backlog of cases awaiting trial. Zimbabwean police made concerted efforts to halt commercial sexual exploitation throughout the country, arresting both individuals in prostitution and their clients; apprehended minors were not detained, but instead were interviewed by the police's Victim Friendly Unit and referred for counseling. In 2007, Zimbabwe's Interpol Office's Human Trafficking Desk, staffed by Zimbabwean police detectives, took part in international trafficking investigations with Interpol offices in Malawi, Mozambique, South Africa, the United Kingdom, and Zambia. The government did not provide specialized anti-trafficking training; however, government officials attended 10 International Organization for Migration (IOM) training workshops that focused on trafficking and the recognition of victims. Since then, Zimbabwe government officials have greatly increased cooperation with NGOs and other international organizations which has allowed for more law enforcement data on trafficking.

In 2017, the government prosecuted one trafficker for exploiting Zimbabweans in both forced labor and sex trafficking in Kuwait. The trial began in early 2017 and several victims were able to testify against the trafficker, landing her a conviction of five counts of trafficking and a sentencing to 50 years of imprisonment by December of that year. However, the trafficker, Norest Maruma, was released after only serving two years at the Chikurubi Female Prison.

=== Protection ===
The growing number of illegal migrants deported from South Africa and Botswana, combined with a crippling lack of resources, severely impeded the government's ability to effectively identify victims of trafficking among returnees. The Department of Immigration required all deportees returning from South Africa via the Beitbridge border crossing to attend an IOM-led briefing on safe migration, which includes a discussion on human trafficking and IOM's assistance services. The District Council of Beitbridge employs a child protection officer and convenes a child protection committee. During 2007, the government allocated land to IOM to establish a second reception center in Plumtree for Zimbabweans deported from Botswana. Although the government has an established process for referring victims to international organizations and NGOs that provide shelter and other services, in 2007 the government primarily depended on these organizations to identify trafficking victims and alert the authorities. Zimbabwe's Interpol Office, the Department of Immigration, and the Department of Social Welfare coordinated victim assistance with South African authorities in ongoing cases during the reporting period. However, each year moving forward from this implementation in 2007, Zimbabwe government officials have been able to identify more and more victims.

The government reported identifying 118 total trafficking victims in 2017 and 2018. Many of these cases were a result of the NGO hotlines established by the Zimbabwean government as well as the established partners back in 2007, although none of the 10 total cases that were identified by government officials occurred in Zimbabwe.

While the 2014 Trafficking in Persons Act required the Zimbabwean government to create and establish shelters, counseling, rehabilitation centers, and reintegration services, there have been no efforts to do so. The NGOs that have provided some of these services to trafficking victims, whether within or outside Zimbabwe, have not received any government funding or support, making it difficult for them to continue to provide adequate help for these victims.

The Ministry of Public Service, Labor, and Social Welfare (MPSLSW) established a system in Zimbabwe and worked with the government in which the identified trafficking victims were able to testify and work with certain NGOs and a social welfare caseworker in shedding light on their specific cases. With this system, the MPSLSW and Zimbabwean government were able to collect data from a group of ten victims that would further their investigations on the matter. Victims were able to go through court proceedings with less trouble due to this new framework. Police officers and other government officials were able to explain their judicial process and how these victims would move forward. This structure was set up in order to ensure that traffickers would not be able to contact their victims during the court process. However, despite all of these efforts, the government reported certain cases in which traffickers were able to "gain access to victims or their families during court proceedings to compromise the witnesses’ testimony."

=== Prevention ===
In the last decade and specifically since 2016, prevention efforts of human trafficking have increased drastically in the country. The anti-trafficking inter-ministerial committee (ATIMC) implemented a National Action Plan (NAP) in order to combat human trafficking and prevent it from ever happening by training certain officials. These targeted trainings would focus on certain trafficking indicators and all the laws that surround the topic of trafficking specific to their country.

During 2007, all four government-controlled radio stations aired an International Organization for Migration public service announcement eight times each day in five languages during peak migration periods. In January 2008, the government signed a memorandum of understanding with the South African government for a joint project to regularize the status of illegal Zimbabwean migrant farm workers in South Africa's Limpopo Province and ensure them proper employment conditions. The inter-ministerial anti-trafficking task-force took no concrete action during this era. Their first true meaningful action did not come until around 2017 when the NAP was implemented. The ATIMC has met quarterly since this implementation to discuss further efforts to ensure human trafficking in Zimbabwe is prevented.

The government increased its previous level of anti-trafficking awareness raising efforts in 2019. However, it is apparent that there is still a general lack of understanding about trafficking across government agencies, especially at the local level. Although, senior government officials have frequently spoken about the dangers of trafficking and illegal migration, and the state-run media has printed and aired warnings about false employment scams and exploitative labor conditions. These officials have set up new programs and implemented education and training to members of the law enforcement force and judicial system.

The most significant block the Zimbabwean government and partners have had to deal with for the prevention of human trafficking is allocation of funds. The government relies on international organizations and other NGOs in their efforts to raise awareness of the problem in Zimbabwe, which is the first step in any prevention program related to human trafficking. Although there have been some government funded awareness programs, the National Action Plan has had little support from the government in their activities.

== See also ==
- Human rights in Zimbabwe
- LGBT rights in Zimbabwe
- Prostitution in Zimbabwe
- Politics of Zimbabwe
- Human trafficking in Nigeria
