= Chinhoyi University of Technology =

University in Zimbabwe

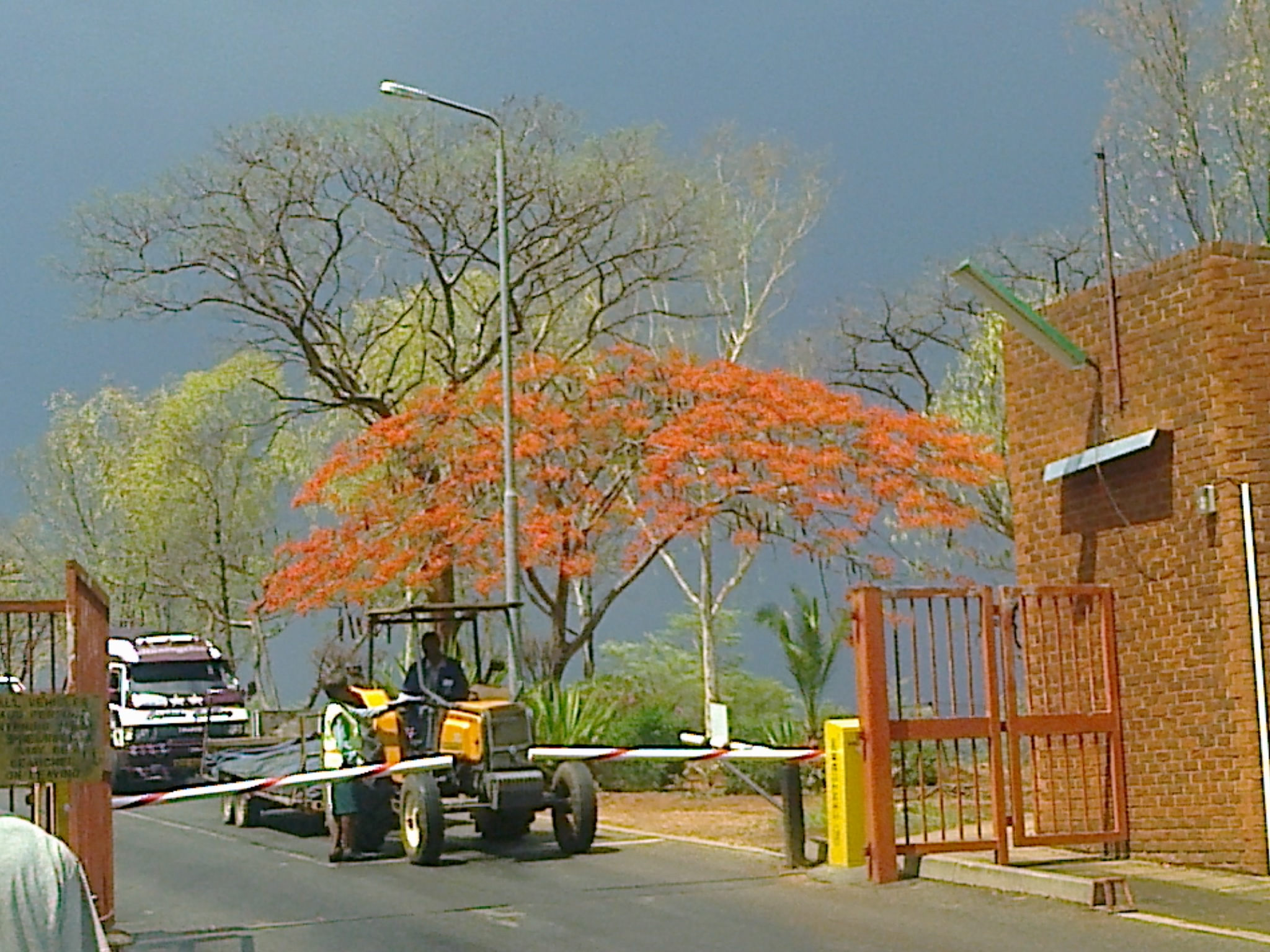
- Type: Public
- Established: 2001
- Chancellor: Emmerson Dambudzo Mnangagwa
- Vice-Chancellor: Professor David J Simbi
- Location: Chinhoyi, Zimbabwe; 17.353°S 30.206°E
- Campus: Urban
- Website: www.cut.ac.zw

Chinhoyi University of Technology also known as CUT was established by an Act by the Parliament of Zimbabwe on 10 December 2001. It is located in the town of Chinhoyi in Mashonaland West about 120 km from Harare towards Lake Kariba and the Zambian border. It is among the first sights visible when approaching the town from Harare, across a bridge to the Chinhoyi General Hospital. The CUT hotel is located adjacent to the main campus.

The Chinhoyi University of Technology grew out of the Chinhoyi Technical Teachers’ College that was founded in 1991. The first-degree programmes were offered in 1999 under the control of the University of Zimbabwe. Soon afterwards, in 2001, the institution gained full university status.

Today, the university provides undergraduate courses in the fields of agriculture, engineering, and business sciences. Technical teacher education, and creative art and design, are offered through the university's single institute, the Institute of Lifelong Learning. With nearly 4,000 students and an academic staff of 163, the university describes itself as ‘a small but highly selective institution’. There are a number of foreign students from other African countries at the university.

A Strategic Management postgraduate masters programme was introduced in 2005, with 62 master's degrees conferred in 2008, alongside the nearly 700 undergraduate degrees. In addition, a new school is being planned, the School of Hospitality and Tourism, which as part of its academic programme will run a hotel existing on the experimental farm as a commercial venture.

Accommodation is offered on the CUT campus but due to an increase in enrollment, it is limited to mostly freshman and final year students. Most of the students have to rent around the town in areas such as Cold Stream and Mzari. Cold stream is closer to campus but is a lot more crowded and unsafe relative to the farther, more relaxed Mzari. Landlords and residents of the town benefit from this and school season is big business for the town.

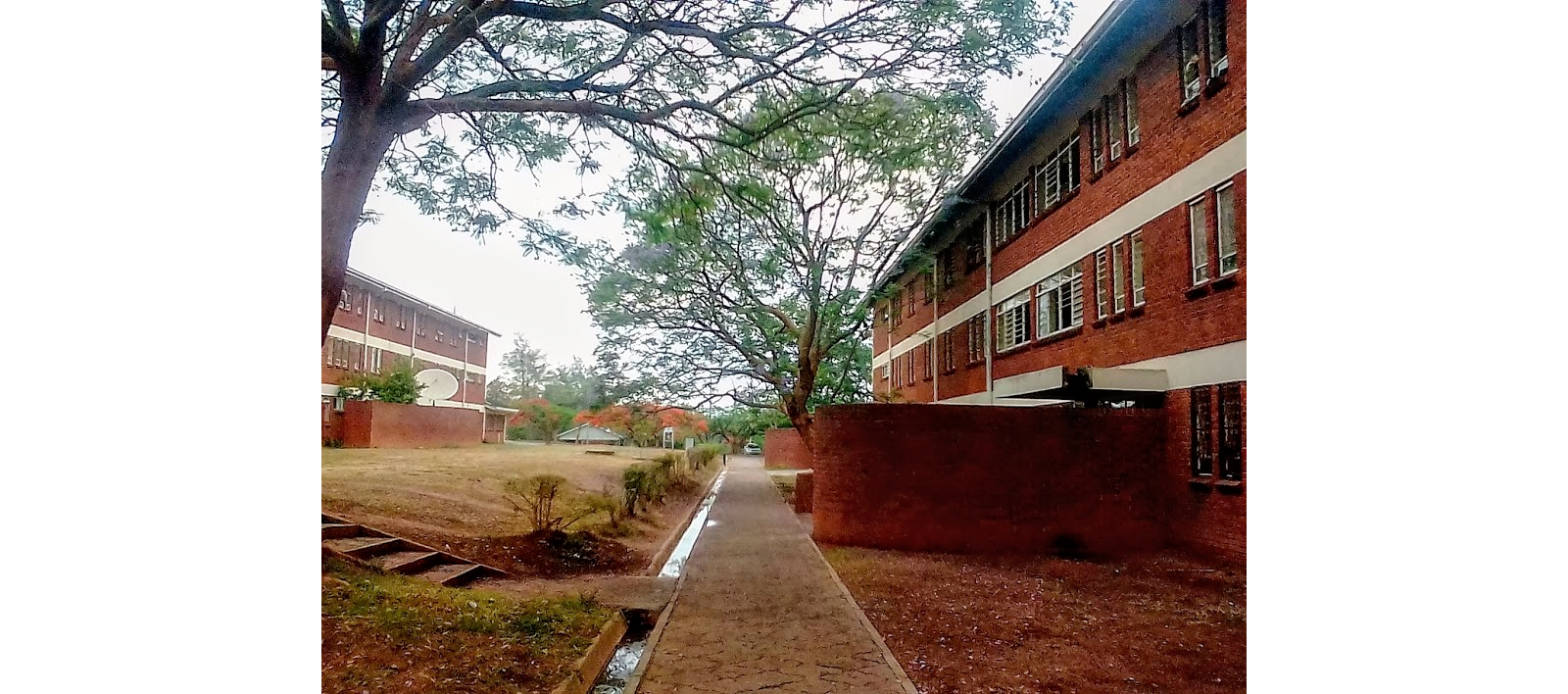
A typical Hostel at CUT

The school has a range of well maintained sporting facilities among them soccer fields, basketball, volleyball and tennis courts, a swimming pool and a gym hall for miscellaneous activities. Students can borrow sporting equipment for use and then return them at an agreed upon time. Students from different fields of study usually participate in friendly sporting challenges, chiefly football. Student events such as the ColourFest are held at the school and they always attract a sizable crowd. There is free WiFi around campus. Concerts are also hosted at the school or at the bars near the school where students mingle. Student politics is an important part of student culture at the institution, with Zicosu and Zinasu as the biggest parties. This is in line with most state universities in Zimbabwe.

== Notable alumni ==
- Darius Mutamba
- Joana Mamombe
- Netsai Marova
