= Murder of Karabo Mokoena =

South African GBV Murder Victim

- Location: Johannesburg, South Africa
- Date: April 28, 2017
- Victim: Karabo Mokoena
- Perpetrator: Sandile Mantsoe
- Motive: Gender-based violence
- Convictions: Assault; Murder; Defeating the ends of justice

Karabo Mokoena (27 March 1995 – 28 April 2017) was a South African gender-based violence victim. Her brutal murder by her boyfriend sparked outrage, with women using the hashtag #MenAreTrash. Her burnt remains were found buried in a shallow grave in a deserted field in Johannesburg, Gauteng.

== Background ==
Karabo Mokoena was a part-time business student and was in a relationship with Sandile Mantsoe, who was a currency trader. Before her disappearance, it was reported that she was involved in a heated argument with Mantsoe outside a nightclub in⁣⁣ Sandton⁣⁣, Gauteng. Mantsoe claimed he left Karabo in the apartment after their argument and upon his return found her dead. He was charged with premeditated murder and defeating the ends of justice.

== Murder ==
Sandile Mantsoe later confessed to police that he killed Karabo and described how he disposed of her body. A source said he told police he'd put her body in a bin, put the bin in his car, and drove to his family home. There, he picked up acid and a container before going to a filling station to buy petrol. He then took her body to Bramley, Gauteng, where he doused her body with acid and petrol and burned it, and buried it in a shallow grave.

Mantsoe told police he killed Karabo because they both had a ritual to give them power for his forex business. Mokoena’s charred body was found in an open veld by a passerby in Lyndhurst, Johannesburg on 29 April 2017. Sandile Mantsoe was found guilty at the High Court in Johannesburg of murdering his 22-year-old ex-girlfriend Karabo Mokoena, whose stabbed and burnt remains were found buried in a shallow grave in a field in Johannesburg. The case has caused shock and outrage, with the victim becoming symbolic of the violence faced by women in South Africa.

On 3 May 2018, Mantsoe was sentenced to 32 years in prison.

In May 2025, Olerato Mongale, a journalist who covered Mokoena's story, was kidnapped and murdered. Her body was found not far from the area where Mokoena's body was found.

== See also ==
- Frances Rasuge
- Olerato Mongale
