= Abductions of Eva Gretzmacher and Claudia Abbt =

2025 abductions of two women in Niger

- Part of the Islamist insurgency in the Sahel
- Duration: 11 January 2025 – 22 October 2026
- Location: Niger and Mali
- Perpetrator: Islamic State – Sahel Province
- Missing: Eva Gretzmacher; Claudia Abbt

Armed men who were hired by the Islamic State – Sahel Province, abducted Eva Gretzmacher on 11 January and Claudia Abbt on 13 April 2025, from their homes in the city of Agadez, Niger.

In May 2026 the kidnappers dramatically reduced Gretzmacher's ransom amount due to her deteriorating health. In early September 2026 several sources reported the release of both Eva Gretzmacher and Claudia Abbt and transport to Benghazi, eastern Libya was pending. On 22 October 2026 it was confirmed both women were on their way from Benghazi to Austria and Switzerland.

There were three other incidents that were possibly linked to the abductions of Gretzmacher and Abbt. Firstly, on 1 February 2025 two Nigerien National Guard soldiers were killed and two CNPC workers were abducted in an ambush near the Agadem Complex. On 24 April, 12 soldiers of the National Guard of Niger were killed near Sakoira. On 25 April, five Indian electricians and a Nigerien worker were abducted in an attack on a worksite near the Kandadji Dam.

== Background ==
Eva Gretzmacher was born on 29 April 1951 in Vienna, Austria. In 1997, she moved to the city of Agadez where she created and worked for the non-profit Association AMANAY for education of young people in music, health, ecology and handcraft. Gretzmacher was the victim of several kidnapping threats in 2021.

Claudia Maria Abbt was born around 1958 in Beirut, Lebanon, and later moved to Switzerland. She had a business in Tamanrasset, Algeria, in the tourism industry, but she would later move to Agadez with her son Younes. Abbt is married to a Nigerien national. Abbt also established Tellit, an organization to help artisans.

== Abductions ==
In the evening of 11 January 2025, 73-year-old development worker Eva Gretzmacher was attacked in her home in the Fada district of Agadez by a group of gunmen who forced her into a 4x4 truck at gunpoint. On 13 April at around 7:35 p.m., 67-year-old Swiss community worker Claudia Abbt was abducted by gunmen at her home in Agadez's Dagmanett 2 district in Agadez. The two women were taken to various locations in the southern area of the Gao Region of Mali, specifically in and around Asongo and Ménaka, and around the area of Adéramboukane.

Shortly after the abductions, Al-Qaeda and Al-Qaeda in the Islamic Maghreb publicly denied having abducted Gretzmacher and Abbt.

On 29 April, the Islamic State – Sahel Province claimed responsibility for the abductions by publishing a photo of Gretzmacher, reportedly in good health. It is believed that the ISSP didn't abduct Gretzmacher and Abbt themselves but rather hired subcontractors who then handed the two women over to the ISSP.

In May 2026 Gretzmacher's ransom was lowered due to her deteriorating health reaching a critical state, with it being likely she could die in captivity.

They were released in Benghazi, Libya, in or earlier to 22 October 2026. Gretzmacher reached Austria per airplane on 22 Octobre 2026, her son Christoph and a crisis team came to the airport Vienna. Abbt was flown from Lybia to her home country Switzerland. The TV-station al-Masar from East-Libya earlier published a video showing both women, thanking Saddam Haftar (mid 30) and his father Chalifa Haftar, (82, military general in Bengasi) for freeing them. „Mein Name ist Eva Gretzmacher, ich bin 76 Jahre alt, und ich danke von ganzem Herzen Marschall Haftar und seinem Sohn Saddam, die uns freigelassen haben“ (German), she said in French. She had lived 40 years in Bengasi. Beate Meinl-Reisinger (NEOS), Austrian Minister for Foreign Affairs thanked "international partners", Ignazio Cassis, Swiss Minister for Foreign Affairs did the same. Christoph Gretzmacher mentioned the countries Mali, Niger and Algeria.

== Other incidents ==
=== Abduction of Navarro Giane Gilbert ===
On 14 January 2025, a Spanish tourist Navarro Giane Gilbert was abducted at the Assekrem plateau in the Ahaggar National Park by up to five Algerian and Malian rebels who hoped to sell Gilbert to ISSP. Gilbert was freed by the Azawad Liberation Front days later on 21 January in the Ménaka Region. Gilbert's abduction was conducted in a similar fashion to Gretzmacher's and Abbt's abductions.

=== Dori-Téra highway attack ===
On 18 January, four Moroccan truck drivers along with a Togolese and Burkinabe who were delivering electrical equipment from Casablanca, Morocco to Niamey, Niger. On the road between Dori, Burkina Faso and Téra, Niger several armed men believed to be ISSP militants abducted the four. The six men were freed in Niger, three days later on 21 January.

=== Agadem Complex attack ===
On 1 February, a truck carrying two National Guard soldiers who were escorting two China National Petroleum Corporation workers were ambushed by suspected ISSP militants near the Agadem Complex Conventional Oil Field in the Agadem Rift Basin near Agadez. In the attack the two soldiers were killed while the two Chinese workers were injured and then abducted.

=== Sakoira and Kandadji Dam attacks ===
On 24 April, 12 Nigerien soldiers who were conducting a military operation north of Sakoira in Tillabéri were ambushed and killed by suspected ISSP militants. Two men were arrested the day after for their involvement in the attack after a military campaign in the region.

On 25 April, a group of local and foreign Indian workers were working on power lines near the Kandadji Dam. Shortly after their lunch break, a group of gunmen on motorcycles attacked their worksite and abducted six of the men, several were able to get away, no one is known to have been killed in the attack. Five of the abducted workers were Indians who were working for the Kalpataru Projects International Limited, the other worker was a local Nigerien worker. The five Indian workers, who were all from the Giridih district of Jharkhand, were identified as Sanjay Mahto, Faljit Mahto, Rajkumar “Raju” Mahto and Chandrika Mahto of Dondlo and Uttam Mahto of Mundro, the Nigerien worker was identified as Adam who was reportedly released shortly afterwards. The five men were believed to be somewhere in the Tillabéri region.

On 2 July the captors contacted the families and friends of the captives warning them. One of the text messages, which was sent to Ajay Kumar whose childhood best friend Rajkumar Mahto was among the abducted, read: “You have 7 days to act or your relatives, all the 5 persons, will be history,” they added “What is needed is known to you.” They also asked Kumar to contact a negotiator at the Nigerian nonprofit organization Kalthum Foundation for Peace based in Maiduguri. The month prior a middleman for the captors sent Kumar two text messages which read “Hello... I believe you are related to Rajukumar who was abducted in Niger Republic," "He, with 4 others. Unfortunately, they were abducted by ISWAP fighters. They reached out to me to pass a message to you. Ur braza gave them ur numba.”

In early January 2026 after 8 months in captivity all five workers were released by their captors after a successful negotiation conducted by Government of Jharkand, the Ministry of External Affairs and the Indian Embassy in Niger.

=== Dosso massacre ===
On 15 July, gunmen ambushed a security team guarding a worksite for an electrical line around 63 miles north of Niamey in the Dosso Region, five locals including a Nigerien soldier, and two Indian electricians Ganesh Karmali (39) of Karipani village and Krishna Kumar Gupta (36) of Kushinagar were killed in the attack, and Ranjit Singh of Chakka Kundi was abducted. Gupta had been shot several times in the chest, waist and head, his body returned home 12 days later, Karmali's body was returned home around 15 days later.
