= Murder of Athena Strand =

2022 child murder in Texas, U.S.

- Location of County Road 3573 in Paradise, Texas, where Athena Strand went missing.
- Location: Paradise, Texas, USA
- Date: November 30, 2022
- Attack type: Kidnapping, child murder
- Deaths: Athena Strand, 7
- Perpetrators: Tanner Lynn Horner, 31
- Verdict: Pleaded guilty on all counts
- Convictions: Capital murder Aggravated kidnapping
- Sentence: Death

On November 30, 2022, in Paradise, Texas, seven-year-old Athena Presley Monroe Strand (May 23, 2015 – November 30, 2022) was kidnapped and murdered by FedEx driver Tanner Lynn Horner (born August 8, 1991). After delivering what was later shown to be Strand's Christmas present to her house, Horner abducted Strand and subsequently strangled her to death. Horner was charged with both capital murder and kidnapping, and pleaded guilty at the start of his trial on April 7, 2026. On May 5, 2026, a judge sentenced Horner to death by lethal injection for the murder, following a unanimous recommendation by the jury.

== Murder ==
On November 30, 2022, seven-year-old Athena Strand was abducted from her home in Paradise, Texas, and later found dead near Boyd, Texas.

That afternoon, a FedEx delivery driver, 31-year-old Tanner Lynn Horner, arrived at the residence to deliver a Christmas package containing Barbie dolls. According to Horner's account, he accidentally struck Athena with his vehicle while backing up and, panicking, placed her in his truck. However, investigators and prosecutors later challenged this version of events, presenting evidence that suggested the abduction was intentional and that Athena may not have been seriously injured when she was first taken.

After kidnapping Strand, Horner drove away with Athena inside the vehicle. Evidence presented at trial indicated that she remained alive for some time and resisted her attacker. Within a relatively short period — likely within about an hour of the abduction — Horner killed her. He later admitted to strangling her, claiming that he did so after Strand wanted to tell her father that he knocked her down. Prosecutors argued that Athena endured prolonged violence and may have been sexually assaulted, citing forensic evidence such as DNA findings and signs of a struggle against her assailant.

Meanwhile, Strand was reported missing by her stepmother on the same day of her kidnapping. Police investigations into her disappearance led them to Horner, who was last found to be delivering Strand's Christmas gift to her house before she went missing. The police took Horner into custody for questioning, and he confessed to the police that he kidnapped and killed Strand. He also led the police to the place where he disposed of Strand's body, which was located near Boyd.

Dallas County Chief Medical Examiner Dr. Jessica Dwyer conducted an autopsy on the victim, and she found that before Strand's death, numerous injuries were inflicted on her face, head, neck, chest and back, and Dr. Dwyer determined that the cause of Strand's death were blunt force injuries with smothering and strangulation. While Dr. Dwyer stated that she did not find evidence of sexual trauma in her examination, she added that it was still possible that some type of sexual contact had occurred.

The day after the murder, Horner googled pictures of Athena Strand, including missing posters and crime scene photos. He also googled queries including "Paradise Missing Girl" and "Do fedex truck cameras constantly record?" [sic].

== Charges and pre-trial process ==
Mugshot of Horner, 2026

On December 5, 2022, Tanner Horner was officially charged with the aggravated kidnapping and capital murder of Athena Strand.

On December 22, 2022, Horner faced an additional three counts of sexually assaulting a minor; these charges were related to three separate incidents that took place in June, August, and December 2013 respectively.

On February 19, 2023, a Wise County grand jury formally indicted Horner for the kidnapping and capital murder of Strand. Three days later, on February 22, 2023, District Attorney James Stainton announced that he would seek the death penalty against Horner for the most serious charge of capital murder. Under Texas state law, the offence of capital murder was punishable by either life in prison without the possibility of parole or the death penalty.

On March 6, 2023, Horner pleaded not guilty to the abduction and murder charges.

On September 13, 2024, Horner sought to change his trial venue from Wise County to another county. A week later, a judge granted Horner's request to move the trial venue, and Horner was ordered to stand trial in Tarrant County.

Originally, Horner was scheduled to stand trial on March 17, 2025, for the abduction-killing of Strand. On March 4, 2025, two weeks before the trial was to take place, Horner's trial was postponed by one year and re-scheduled to begin on April 7, 2026.

On December 8, 2025, a two-week pre-trial hearing was held to determine and assess the procedural matters and evidence before the case was officially transferred to the trial phase.

On January 14, 2026, Horner's lawyers filed a motion seeking to take the death penalty off the table, on the grounds that Horner had autism spectrum disorder and it significantly reduced his moral responsibility in the murder.

On January 21, 2026, Judge George Gallagher denied the defense's motion to exclude the death penalty from Horner's upcoming trial.

== Trial ==
=== Guilty plea and sentencing submissions ===
On April 7, 2026, Horner pleaded guilty to the capital murder and kidnapping of Strand and was therefore convicted.

==== Prosecution ====
A sentencing trial was carried out on the same date of Horner's conviction. During the sentencing phase, the prosecution put forward a litany of evidence to assert Horner's guilt and the aggravating factors in favor of the death penalty. Among the evidence, the prosecution presented DNA test results which showed that there were traces of male DNA found in the body of Strand, which were matched to Horner, and swab tests also confirmed the likelihood that Horner sexually assaulted Strand before her death.

Apart from this, the jurors were also shown the clips of dash cam footage taken from Horner's FedEx truck, which showed the final moments of Strand's life before her murder (only the one photo captured before Horner covered the camera is shown), and audio recordings that revealed the assault on Strand before Horner killed her. In the video, Strand can be heard repeatedly asking Horner, "Are you a kidnapper?" and Horner can be heard telling Strand he thought she was "pretty" and demanding that she take her shirt off, which she refused to do. The audio recording of Strand's murder was more than an hour long; jurors reportedly sobbed while the audio played. District Attorney James Stainton also argued that Horner had told "lie upon lie upon lie upon lie" by fabricating that he accidentally hit Strand with his truck and therefore kidnapped and killed her in a panic, and also contended that Horner had sexually assaulted Strand before strangling her. Prosecutors showed another video showing that the day after the murder, Strand's family members and police officers were searching for Strand when Horner drove past them; a member of the search party told Horner that a young child had been abducted, to which Horner replied, "Are you serious?"

On April 7, two women testified that Horner had sexually assaulted them when they were 16 years old. All assaults took place in 2013 and 2014, and Horner was in his 20s at the time. One of the women said Horner assaulted her twice, the first time after he had plied her with alcohol so she would be too drunk to consent, and that when she dated him, he instructed her to lie about her age and tell people she was 18 years old. The second woman testified that he sexually assaulted her in her sleep despite Horner knowing she "was not interested in him like that." The second woman approached police after Horner was arrested for Strand's murder and told them about her assault, and afterwards, authorities charged him with two counts of sexual assault of a child. The cases were still pending during Horner's sentencing phase. Both women said they regretted not reporting Horner earlier.

Strand's parents were allowed to testify in court as witnesses to speak about how the loss of their daughter affected them and their lives, and Strand's father stated he wished the court could make the "right decision" in meting out justice for his daughter. Strand's father also testified that Strand's sister needed therapy after the murder due to recurring nightmares about "everything that she's having to hear about and what happened to her sister." One of Horner's cousins alleged that Horner sexually assaulted him twice during his childhood and adolescence, and also revealed that Horner had told him he wondered how it would feel to kill a person.

==== Defense ====
In his defense, Horner expressed that he did not kill Strand, but it was "Zero", an alternate personality or "alter ego" inside him, who committed the crimes; officials from the Department of Public Safety corroborated that Horner had told them about "Zero" during police interrogations into the Strand murder case. Horner testified that after he initially hit Strand with his van by accident, he "listened to a little voice" in his head that instructed him to kidnap and murder her, and Horner added he was afraid of losing his job because of the accident.

The defense also argued that Horner should be sentenced to life without parole instead of death, submitting that he had autism and two of Horner's former teachers were also called to testify about Horner's unstable childhood (including his mother's negligence of her son) and struggles in school due to cognitive difficulties. Horner's mother also testified that she was pregnant with Horner at age 19 due to Horner's father raping her before marrying her, and she had abused drugs and alcohol prior to discovering her pregnancy, and acknowledged that she continued smoking both marijuana and cigarettes even while pregnant and abused drugs during Horner's childhood.

==== Psychiatric and medical evidence ====
Psychiatric and medical experts were also summoned to testify in relation to Horner's psychiatric state. Child forensic psychiatry expert Eileen Ryan testified that Horner had several psychiatric disorders, including autism spectrum disorder, Asperger syndrome, depression, ADHD and bipolar disorder, but these conditions did not excuse his crime and that they did not have a direct causal link to the murder of Strand. Aaron Specht, an environmental health and physics assistant professor at Purdue University, testified that Horner experienced significant lead exposure as a child and it led to him having neurological problems.

Eric Imhof, a forensic psychologist, testified that he diagnosed Horner with bipolar disorder and generalized anxiety disorder, but found that he did not have antisocial personality disorder or multiple personality disorder; the latter finding indicated that he did not have an alter ego named "Zero". Forensic psychiatrist Kim Spence stated that while Horner may have met the criteria for an autism diagnosis, it did not drive him to kill Strand. Regarding Horner's mother's alcohol abuse during pregnancy, Julian K. Davies testified that despite having moderate brain dysfunction, Horner did not meet the criteria for a fetal alcohol spectrum disorder diagnosis.

==== Closing submissions ====
In their closing arguments, Wise County District Attorney James Stainton characterized the crime as among the "worst of the worst", arguing it met the standard for the death penalty. Prosecutors contended that Horner had fantasized about violence and may have planned the abduction and murder of Athena Strand, pointing to testimony about his tendency to engage in fantasy and suggesting this extended to the crime itself. The defense, however, urged the jury to impose a life sentence instead. They highlighted Horner’s difficult background, including his autism diagnosis, childhood lead exposure, and ongoing mental health issues. Defense attorneys argued that prosecutors had not proven he would remain a future danger if imprisoned and that these mitigating factors justified sparing his life and warranted life imprisonment.

=== Sentencing ===
On May 5, 2026, Horner was sentenced to death by Judge George Gallagher upon the jury's unanimous recommendation for capital punishment. In their verdict, the jury accepted the prosecution's argument that Horner was a "continuing threat to society" and that he had the propensity to re-offend and commit criminal violence, and decided there was no mitigating factor in favor of life without parole for the defendant.

After Horner's sentence was pronounced, a victim impact statement was read aloud by Strand's uncle, in which he said to Horner, "I want you to know that you are nothing. You are a footnote in Athena's story. Her name will forever be remembered, her name will forever be celebrated, and everyone will forget you."

== Appeal and death row ==
After sentencing, Horner was transferred to death row at the Allan B. Polunsky Unit.

Under Texas state law, offenders who receive death sentences are entitled to mandatory appeals filed to the Texas Court of Criminal Appeals. One legal expert, who spoke about the Athena Strand case, stated that it would take several years for the appellate process to last, including possible post-conviction petitions and federal appeals, before Horner could be executed.

On May 12, 2026, Horner formally filed a notice of appeal to the Texas Court of Criminal Appeals.

In July 2026, Horner filed a separate motion to the Tarrant County Court seeking a new trial. Ultimately, on August 1, 2026, the request for a new trial was denied by Tarrant County Judge George Gallagher.

== Aftermath ==
On December 14, 2022, two weeks after the murder of Athena Strand, her father filed a lawsuit suing Tanner Horner, FedEx, and its subcontractor, Big Topspin (the company which directly employed Horner), for causing the death of Strand by negligence, and seeking more than $1 million.

In December 2022, during the week after Strand was murdered, several school districts across Texas encouraged their students to wear pink-colored clothing in honor of Strand, and more than 20 districts participated. A vigil was conducted in remembrance of Strand, and many of the mourners also wore pink to remember the girl.

In January 2023, in honor of Athena Strand, toy company Mattel donated 2,000 Barbie Dolls and other toys to the Cook Children's Medical Center in Fort Worth, Texas.

Five months later, in April 2023, Strand's mother advocated for the state to designate a new localized alert in future cases of missing children under the absence or presence of evidence of possible abduction, so as to alert the community more quickly. A bill, titled House Bill 3556 or "Athena's Alert" was therefore proposed. The bill was passed by the Texas House in May 2023. The bill was later passed by the Senate and a month later, Governor Greg Abbott formally signed the bill into law.

On May 23, 2023, the date of Strand's eighth birthday, members of the North Texas community were encouraged to wear pink in honor of Strand.

On May 5, 2026, the day Horner was sentenced to death, the courthouse facade was illuminated in pink as a tribute to Athena Strand. On May 19, 2026, a memorial was set up at Bobo's Crossing in Wise County.

== See also ==
- Capital punishment in Texas
- List of death row inmates in the United States § Texas
- List of murdered American children
- List of kidnappings (2020–present)
