= Sakoira =

Coordinates: 14°17′N 1°24′E

- Commune and village
- Interactive map of Sakoira
- Country: Niger

Area
  - Total: 271.8 sq mi (704.0 km^{2})

Population (2012 census)
  - Total: 26,776
  - Density: 98.51/sq mi (38.03/km^{2})
- Time zone: UTC+1 (WAT)

Sakoira is a village and rural commune in Niger. As of 2012, it had a population of 26,776.

== 2025 attack ==
On 24 April suspected ISSP fighters killed 12 Nigerien soldiers in an attack on the village. The next day five Indian electricians were abducted by armed men at the nearby Kandadji Dam.
