= 2025 Oreke-Okeigbo attack =

Attack in Kwara State, Nigeria

- Part of the Boko Haram insurgency
- Location: Oreke-Oke, Kwara State, Nigeria
- Date: 4 June 2025 c.6:30 p.m.
- Attack type: Mass shooting, and abduction
- Deaths: Haruna Watsai; Tukur Ogah
- Victims: David Adenaiye; Sam Xie Wie
- Perpetrator: Boko Haram (suspected)

On 4 June 2025, unidentified Islamist militants attacked the Oreke-Okeigbo marble stone mining site at Oreke-Oke in the Ifelodun LGA in Kwara State, Nigeria. Two police officers who were guarding the site were killed while two workers were kidnapped, one being a local and the other being a Chinese national. The two men are currently being held for ransom.

== Attack ==
On 4 June 2025 at around c. 6:30 p.m. unidentified gunmen attacked the Oreke-Okeigbo marble stone mining site near Oreke-Okeigbo. They killed two officers of the Nigerian Mobile Police, Assistant Superintendent Haruna Watsai and Inspector Tukur Ogah. The two officers were a part of the 45 Police Mobile Force in Abuja. The gunmen then took the two officers' guns and abducted two workers, David Adenaiye of Kogi State and Sam Xie Wie a Chinese investor.

The day after the attack the attackers contacted an associate of Wie, Leo Liang, demanding ₦1,000,000,000 for the release of Adenaiye and Wie. As of 22 July 2025 Adenaiye and Wie are still being held captive. The mining company that employed the two workers is in negotiations with the kidnappers. On 23 July operatives of the People's Liberation Army reportedly stormed the Ifelodun Local Government Area in an attempt to rescue the two men.

On 8 August unidentified gunmen on motorcycles attacked a police station in the Babanla community in the Ifelodun LGA killing five people, one of whom was identified as police inspector Adejuno Wasiu. It is unknown if the attack on the Babanla police station is connected to the Oreke-Okeigbo attack.
