= Thuzar Maung =

Burmese refugee activist (1977-)

Thuzar Maung (Burmese: သူဇာမောင်; born c. 1977), sometimes spelled as Thu Zar Moung, is a Burmese refugee activist. Born into a Muslim family in Myanmar, she fled the country in 2015 following the increased persecution of Muslims there, eventually receiving refugee status in Malaysia. A supporter of the National Unity Government of Myanmar and a critic of the Tatmadaw, Thuzar Maung has also been a vocal activist for the rights of Burmese refugees and migrants living in Malaysia. On 4 July 2023, Thuzar Maung and her family were abducted by a group of unidentified men from their home in Selangor; in October 2025, Burmese authorities confirmed that the family were in their custody.

== Personal life ==
Thuzar Maung lived in Mandalay, Myanmar until 2015. At the time of her disappearance, she lived in Ampang Jaya, Malaysia with her husband, Saw Than Tin Wan, and their children, Poeh Khing Maung, Aung Myint Maung and Thukha Maung.

== Activism ==
As a member of Myanmar's Muslim community, Thuzar Maung fled the country in 2015 with her husband and children following a rise in anti-Muslim sentiment and violence in the country. After first travelling to Thailand, where she received a visa, she went on to travel to Malaysia, where she presented her situation to the United Nations Refugee Agency, following which she and her family were officially recognised as refugees.

Thuzar Maung is a supporter of the National Unity Government, particularly when it came to addressing and advocating for the rights of Burmese refugees and migrants. She has been critical of the military junta following the 2021 coup d'état, and used her Facebook page to share evidence of their human rights abuses; her last post was on 4 July 2023, hours before she disappeared.

Thuzar Maung often worked with the UNRA to support Burmese refugees living in Malaysia in accessing essential support and services. She was the chair of the Myanmar Muslim Refugee Community, as well as the Myanmar Migrant Workers Committee. She had previously raised concerns around the validity and safety of the Burmese embassy in Malaysia due to it being controlled by the military junta. She was also critical of the Malaysian government's decision to deport over 1000 Burmese refugees in February 2021, including Rohingya Muslims, despite the country being vocal in its opposition to the junta.

== Disappearance and investigation ==
On 4 July 2023, Thuzar Maung, her husband and their three children disappeared from their home in a gated community in Ampang Jaya, near Kuala Lumpur. Eyewitness statements and CCTV footage purportedly showed a group of unknown men identifying themselves as officers from the Royal Malaysia Police, though subsequent examination of their vehicle's licence plate confirmed that it was not an RMP vehicle. The family's mobile phones were all turned off immediately following their disappearances, and none of them have been turned on since. The following day, the chief of the RMP in Selangor, Hussein Omar Khan, confirmed that a missing persons inquiry had been opened after the family were reported missing.

On 18 July 2023, the Malaysian government announced an official investigation into the family's disappearance was being launched. In September 2023, a police investigator stated that upon reviewing the CCTV footage, that the family's departure from their home appeared to be "voluntary", suggesting that they had fled from the home rather than being abducted from it.

Organisations including the Burmese Rohingya Organisation has questioned the quality of the official investigation, with Human Rights Watch calling on the Malaysian government to commit to bringing the perpetrators to justice.

On 17 October 2025, Burmese authorities stated that Thuzar Maung, her husband and their children had been detained for "illegally re-entering Myanmar", as well as in relation to an arrest warrant that had been issued for Thuzar Maung in January 2023 under Myanmar's counter-terrorism law. A picture was released of Thuzar Maung and her family in Burmese custody.

=== Response ===
Human Rights Watch, who reported having seen the footage of the family's disappearance, described it as an "abduction", and believed that at least one of the perpetrators may have been linked to the Malaysian government, due to the "meticulous" nature of the abduction appearing to be a "planned operation". They, alongside other Burmese activists and organisations, have stated that only the military junta had a motive to abduct Thuzar Maung, with anonymous sources claiming that her support of the National Unity Government had made her and her family a target. The National Unity Government released a statement following Thuzar Maung's disappearance praising her work supporting Burmese Muslim refugees in Malaysia, and called on the government there to act without delay to find her.
