= Fredrick Wangabo Mwenengabo =

Congolese-Canadian anthropologist and activist (born 1975)

- Born: 1975 (age 50–51); Zaire
- Education: University of Kisangani; University of Nairobi

Fredrick Wangabo Mwenengabo (born 1975) is a Congolese-Canadian anthropologist and human rights activist who has taught anthropology at the University of New Brunswick in Fredericton. In 2023, he was kidnapped while visiting family members in Goma, and was held for ransom until being released. He returned to Canada on 1 June 2024.

== Biography ==
Mwenengabo was born in 1975 in Zaire (the modern-day Democratic Republic of the Congo). He later recounted having experienced discrimination as a result of his ethnicity, being "from one of the most marginalized and oldest indigenous community in the DRC." Mwenengabo's activism in the Congo led to him receiving death threats and, in 2005, Mwenengabo was arrested under the accusation of attempting to overthrow the government. Afterwards, he began working for Amnesty International after fleeing to Uganda. In 2009, he immigrated to Canada, settling in Fredericton, New Brunswick, where he began working as an anthropology educator at the University of New Brunswick. He has also worked for the East and Central African Association for Indigenous Rights, as well as the Centre communautaire Sainte-Anne, supporting recent Francophone immigrants to Canada.

In 2012, Mwenengabo did a 48-day long hunger strike, raising awareness towards the federal government about human rights issues in the Congo.

While visiting family in the Congo on 16 December 2023, Mwenengabo was kidnapped in the city of Goma, Kivu Province. He was accompanied by his brother and a friend, both of whom were also kidnapped but soon released. Mwenengabo was held captive for several months, with his kidnappers demanding ransom from his family. At first, his kidnappers sought US$15 million for his release, and provided his sons with photos showing Mwenengabo in a deteriorating state of health. Mwenengabo's sons, along with provincial Green Party leader David Coon, advocated for the Canadian government to help in his release. On 1 June 2024, Mwenengabo returned to Fredericton after being released to the Congolese National Intelligence Agency.

In May 2025, Mwenengabo was arrested while working for an organization in Burundi after being unable to pay for his hotel bill due to not being paid by the organization. As of August 2026, he is currently held at Mpinmba Central Prison in Bujumbura. In early 2026, he was injured by a munitions explosion near the prison.

== See also ==
- List of kidnappings
