= Netsai Marova =

Zimbabwean youth campaigner

- Born: Zimbabwe
- Citizenship: Zimbabwean
- Occupations: Youth activist; Political activist
- Years active: 2017–present
- Organizations: MDC Alliance Youth Assembly
- Known for: Pro-democracy activism; 2020 abduction case in Zimbabwe
- Notable work: Advocacy for youth and women's rights
- Political party: Movement for Democratic Change Alliance (MDC Alliance)
- Awards: Gumiguru 50 Under 30 Emerging Young Leaders (2021)

Netsai Marova is a Zimbabwean youth campaigner for the Movement for Democratic Change, who was abducted for two days at an anti-government protest in May 2020.

As a student at Chinhoyi University of Technology at the age of 15, Marova highlighted the vulnerable position of women students there in 2017. She has been mentored by MP Joana Mamombe, a fellow Chinhoyi student, and has in turn provided similar support to young girls in Mabvuku.

On 13 May 2020 she and two other women, MP Joana Mamombe and fellow youth activist Cecilia Chimbiri, were abducted by masked assailants at a Harare protest against the government's failure to provide for the poor during the COVID-19 pandemic. Two days later, the women were found, badly injured and traumatised, by the side of the road sixty miles from Harare. They reported having been tortured and repeatedly sexually assaulted. The three women were then charged with "communicating falsehoods" for their claims to have been abducted, tortured and held incommunicado by unidentified people. In August 2020 they appeared at court, and had their trial postponed until September 15.

In 2021, Netsai Marova was included in Gumiguru's "50 Under 30 Emerging Young Leaders in Zimbabwe" list, where she was ranked sixth.

== See also ==
- List of kidnappings
