= Theresa Nyava =

Zimbabwean activist fighting period poverty

Theresa Farai Nyava-Machadu
- Born: 1991 (age 34–35); Zvimba District, Mashonaland West, Zimbabwe
- Citizenship: Zimbabwean
- Occupation: Activist
- Years active: 2016–present
- Organizations: Sanitary Aid Zimbabwe Trust
- Known for: Campaigning against period poverty
- Notable work: Advocacy for menstrual health and education
- Title: Founder of Sanitary Aid Zimbabwe Trust
- Awards: Power, Together Award (2019); World of Difference Award (2022); Frontline Hero Award (2022)

Theresa Farai Nyava-Machadu (born 1991) is a Zimbabwean activist campaigning against period poverty. Nyava is the founder of Sanitary Aid Zimbabwe Trust, a nongovernmental organization helping fight stigma and discrimination around menstruation and prevent girls from rural areas from leaving school due to lack of access to sanitary products.

== Biography ==
=== Early life ===
Nyava grew up in Zimbabwe's Zvimba district in Mashonaland West. As one in a family of 15, of which 7 were girls requiring sanitary products, Nyava personally faced period poverty in her home as a child. In Zimbabwe, her situation was not unusual, as a majority of girls do not have access to sanitary products.

Nyava-Machadu found the prevalence of period poverty had significant impacts on educational outcomes for girls, who would find themselves in desperate situations without access to sanitary products. Nyava-Machadu observed,

"girls are often laughed at when they spoil their school uniform or the school chair, or when walking awkwardly due to use of improper and inconvenient menstrual absorbents such as rags, cow dung, you name it.”

=== Sanitary Aid Zimbabwe ===
In 2016, she established Sanitary Aid Zimbabwe with her own savings, in an effort to do more to prevent other girls from facing the same challenges she did growing up. Sanitary Aid Zimbabwe is a charitable organization that helps to distribute period products to needy girls and women. The organization also works with schools to help educate young people about menstruation and health. In 2019, Nyava-Machadu helped develop a reusable sanitary pad that won third place in the FemBioBiz entrepreneurial competition.

=== Advocacy ===
Through Sanitary Aid Zimbabwe, Nyava-Machadu has also worked to lobby the Zimbabwean government to allocate funding towards supporting sanitary products for girls, and for removing tax barriers to menstrual products. In 2019, the government passed its first budget explicitly outlining period products for schools.

When provisions on sanitary products were not passed in subsequent budget allocations, Nyava-Machadu responded by calling on the government for action. In addition to her work lobbying government, Nyava-Machadu regularly raises awareness about period poverty in the press through regular columns in the media.

== Awards ==
- 2019 – Power, Together award, Women Leaders Global Forum at the Reykjavík Global Forum.
- 2022 – World of Difference Award, The International Alliance for Women.
- 2022 – Frontline Hero Award, Ignite Youth Awards

== See also ==
- Menstrual hygiene management
