= Yeri Bocoum =

- Occupation: Journalist

Yeri Bocoum is a Malian journalist. After being kidnapped for several weeks in June 2024, Bocoum sought asylum in France in February 2025.

== Career ==
As of June 2024, Bocoum is the vice-president of the Association of Social Media Professionals and Web Actors (APMSWA), which is based in Bamako, Mali's capital. He also runs the Facebook news page YBC-Communication.

== Disappearance and threats ==
Bocoum was last seen in public on 7 June 2024. At the time, he had been covering an unauthorized, but well-attended, demonstration by Synergie pour le Mali (Synergy of Action for Mali), which comprised a coalition of opposition political groups who were protesting against electricity shortages, the high cost of living in the country, and mismanagement of resources by authorities. Bocoum was the only journalist to cover the event. Later that day, Bocoum posted online that he had been followed by two people on motorcycles.

Relatives reported that on 8 June, Bocoum was taken from outside his home in Kati by "unknown assailants". On 13 June, Radio France Internationale reported that Bocoum was being held by "Malian state security services". As of 27 June, Bocoum's family had not received any updates from authorities. Later that month, the Committee to Protect Journalists, an American nonprofit organization, urged Malian authorities to investigate Bocoum's disappearance. The International Federation for Human Rights released a similar report and request.

Yeri Bocoum was freed on June 27. However, Bocoum continued to report threats and surveillance of his movements.

== Emigration ==
In February 2025, Bocoum fled Mali, traveling through Côte d'Ivoire and Senegal. He requested asylum at Châteauroux in southern France, with plans for his application to be reviewed in August 2025.

== See also ==
- List of kidnappings
