= Kidnapping of Selsela Alikhil =

2021 abduction case in Pakistan

- Location: Islamabad, Pakistan
- Date: 16 July 2021; 1.45–7 p.m. (PST, UTC+05:00)
- Attack type: Kidnapping and torture
- Victim: Selsela Alikhil

Selsela Alikhil (Pashto: سلسله علي‌خېل), also spelled Silsila Alikhel, is the daughter of an Afghan envoy, Najibullah Alikhil. She was kidnapped on 16 July 2021 at 1.45pm in Islamabad, Pakistan, where her father was serving as the ambassador of Afghanistan.

Silsila lost consciousness as she was beaten by an attacker who forcefully entered her taxi on her way home, and upon regaining consciousness, she found that her hands and legs had been tied. She was retrieved around 7pm near F-9 Park, Islamabad. After she was rescued from the kidnappers’ captivity, Ms Alikhil was under medical care at the hospital, which began an investigation and security for Afghan diplomats medical report showed that she had some swelling in her brain due to blows to her head and she had torture marks on her body.

== Reactions ==
=== Pakistani government ===
On 17 July, the Pakistani Foreign Ministry confirmed that Selsela Alikhil had been assaulted and said the government was trying to apprehend the culprits, but in an about-turn on 18 July, the Pakistani interior minister, Sheikh Rasheed Ahmad, claimed that she was not kidnapped at all but that it was a conspiracy against Pakistan by the Indian intelligence agency. This allegation was strongly rejected by the Afghan Foreign Ministry, while the Indian Ministry of External Affairs described Pakistan's denial of the kidnapping as "stooping to a new low."

=== Afghan government ===
In reaction to the incident, Afghanistan withdrew its ambassador and top diplomats from Pakistan's capital until all security threats to them were neutralized.

== Protests ==
A large group of Afghans protested against the incident outside the Embassy of Pakistan in Kabul.

Members of the Afghan diaspora protested against the incident across the globe, including in the United States, Belgium, Denmark, Germany and the United Kingdom. They expressed their displeasure over Pakistan's support for the Taliban and called for a permanent ceasefire in Afghanistan. There were protests in Washington, D.C. and London on 23 July, in Berlin on 24 July, and in Brussels on 25 July.

In Copenhagen, Denmark, activists from the Pashtun Tahafuz Movement (PTM) protested on 23 July in front of the Pakistan Embassy against the kidnapping of Selsela Alikhil and the alleged abduction of 11-year-old Ulus Yar Khan by the Pakistan intelligence agency.

== See also ==
- List of kidnappings
