= Joanah Mamombe =

Zimbabwean politician

Joana Ruvimbo Mamombe (born 18 June 1993) is a Zimbabwean politician, former student leader and a member of the Citizens Coalition for Change. In the 2018 Zimbabwean general election she was the youngest Zimbabwean member of parliament, representing Harare West.

== Early years and education ==
Mamombe was born in Harare on June 18, 1993. She had her secondary education at Monte Cassino Girls High School where she graduated in 2011. She proceeded to Chinhoyi University of Technology and graduated with a bachelor's degree in Biotechnology. While at the university, she served as Gender Officer for the Zimbabwe National Students Union (ZINASU). After graduating from Chinhoyi University of Technology, she furthered at University of Bergen in Norway where she attained a Master's Degree in Molecular Biology with the program “students at risk”.

== Career ==
Mamombe joined politics after completing her studies in Norway and returning to Zimbabwe in 2018. In that same year, she was elected as the member of parliament representing Harare West under the ticket of the MDC Alliance. After the elections which was held on July 30, 2018, she was sworn into office.

== Arrest, treason allegation and abduction ==
On 2 March 2019, she was arrested and charged with treason. It was alleged that she was attempting to overthrow a constitutional elected government led by president Emmerson Mnangagwa, after she led a protest on 14 January 2018.

On 13 May 2020 she and two other women, MDC activists Cecilia Chimbiri and Netsai Marova, were abducted by masked assailants at a Harare protest against the government's failure to provide for the poor during the COVID-19 pandemic. Two days later, the women were found, badly injured and traumatised, by the side of the road sixty miles from Harare. They reported having been tortured and repeatedly sexually assaulted.

Since May 2020, the three women have been arrested and detained several more times. Despite Mamombe appearing in court 129 times over the last 12 months, she has been repeatedly denied bail. As part of their latest bail conditions, Mamombe and Chimbiri are not allowed to address a gathering of more than 50 people or engage in any activity, which violates Covid-19 regulations.

== See also ==
- List of kidnappings
