= Lombardy East =

Residential suburb of eastern Johannesburg, South Africa

- Location within Gauteng Location within South Africa
- Coordinates: 26.1146°S 28.1210°E
- Country: South Africa
- Province: Gauteng
- Municipality: City of Johannesburg
- Main Place: Johannesburg

Area
  - Total: 2.96 km^{2} (1.14 sq mi)

Population (2011)
  - Total: 13,406
  - Density: 4,530/km^{2} (11,700/sq mi)

Racial makeup (2011)
  - Black African: 88.37%
  - Coloured: 1.5%
  - Indian/Asian: 2.38%
  - White: 7.26%
  - Other: 0.49%

First languages (2011)
  - English: 14.72%
  - Afrikaans: 5.7%
  - Zulu: 19.14%
  - Sotho: 17.9%
  - Other: 42.94%
- Time zone: UTC+2 (SAST)
- Postal code (street): 2090

Lombardy East is a residential suburb of eastern Johannesburg, South Africa. It is located in Region E of the City of Johannesburg Metropolitan Municipality.

== History ==
Originally called the Lombardy Estate, it is named after Lombardy in Italy, a very fertile and productive region of Italy that the landowner M. A. Zoccola wanted to emulate. Zoccola purchased the land in 1893 and consisted of 262 ha.
