= Cecilia Chimbiri =

Zimbabwean politician

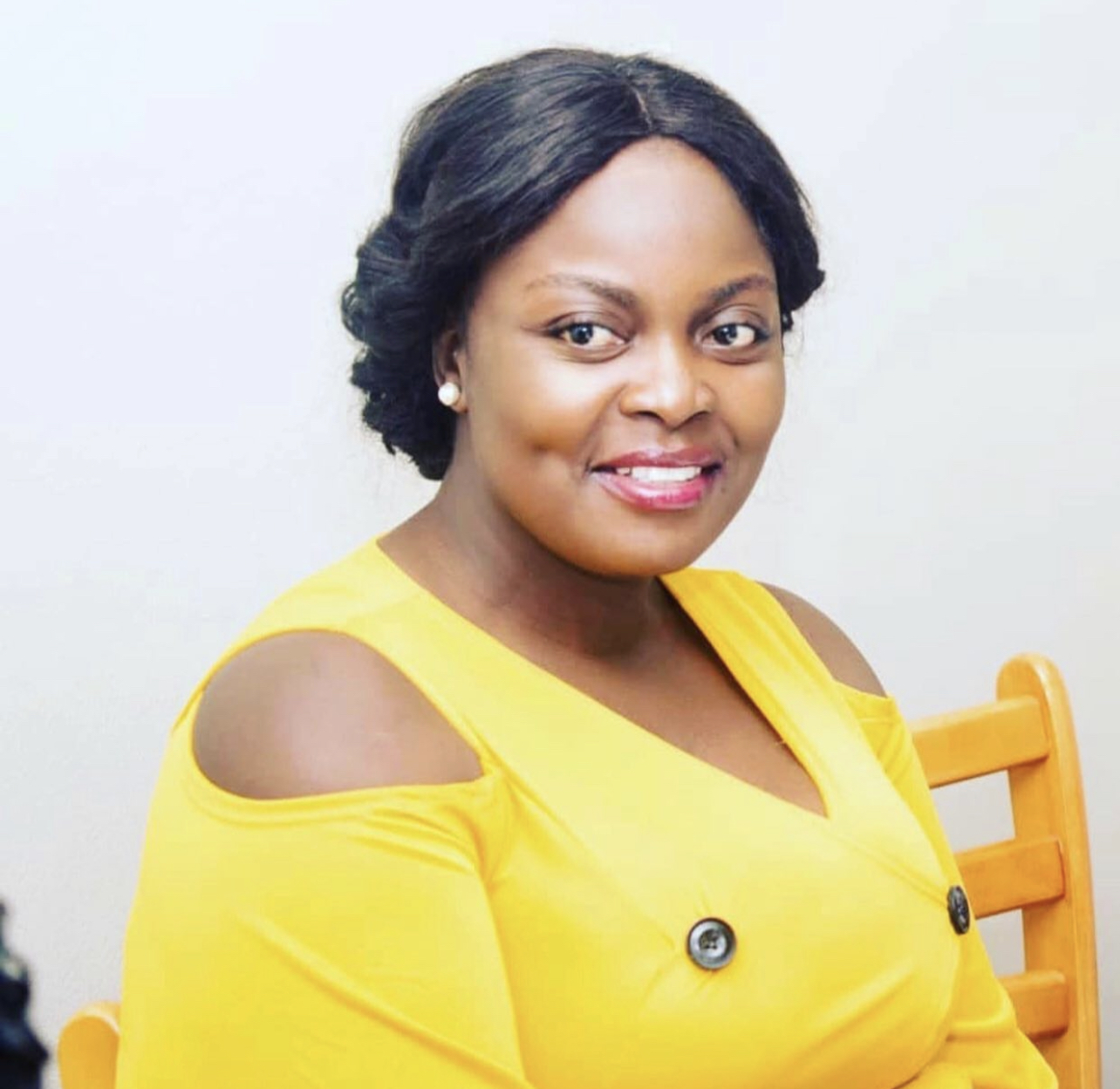
- Born: Zimbabwe
- Citizenship: Zimbabwean
- Occupations: Politician; human rights activist
- Years active: 2009–present
- Organizations: Citizens Coalition for Change; MDC Alliance; Women's Academy for Africa; Forum 2000
- Known for: Pro-democracy activism; 2020 abduction case
- Office: Harare City Councillor (Women's quota)
- Political party: Citizens Coalition for Change (CCC); Movement for Democratic Change (MDC Alliance)

Cecilia Chimbiri is a Zimbabwean pro-democracy activist and human rights defender. She served as Acting Youth Chairperson of the MDC Alliance. She is a member of the Citizens Coalition for Change led by Nelson Chamisa.

== Career ==
In 2009, Cecillia Chimbiri worked in the Government of National Unity as Information Assistant to Deputy Prime Minister Professor Arthur Mutambara.

She was appointed to the Constitution Making Process run by the Constitutional Parliamentary Committee (COPAC) as a Rapporteur until the drafting stage as Technical Assistant.

On referendum stage of the 2013 Constitution she was a blogger for Vote Yes for the People Driven Constitution by (Copac).

Cecillia Chimbiri was appointed Political Liaison Officer to the Joint Monitoring and Implementation Committee (JOMIC) in Mashonaland Central Provincial representing MDC. JOMIC was a Zimbabwean multipartisan panel that was first launched on 30 January 2009, pursuant of the 2008 Zimbabwean power-sharing agreement.

Cecillia Chimbiri is listed on the Forum 2000 female database as a member of a panel of experts on human rights which pursues the legacy of former Czech President Václav Havel and supports the values of democracy and respect for human rights, as well as assisting the development of civil society.

She is an alumnus of the Friedrich Nauman Foundation, which listed her as a human rights defender. She is the Deputy Secretary of the Women's Academy for Africa (southern region).

She is a Change Champion in the Citizens Coalition for Change led by President Nelson Chamisa and recently appointed Harare City Councillor on the 30% Women's quota.

== Abduction ==
On 13 May 2020, Chimbiri and two other women, including MP Joana Mamombe, were abducted by masked assailants at a Harare protest against the government's failure to provide for the poor during the COVID-19 pandemic. Two days later, the women were found, badly injured and traumatized, by the side of the road sixty miles from Harare. They reported having been tortured and repeatedly sexually assaulted. Following the reports of the incident, then Zimbabwean Deputy Information Minister Energy Mutodi accused the trio of "stage-managing" the abduction and attacks in order to oust the ruling ZANU–PF government. In an interview, Mutodi claimed that opponents of the leading party have used "fake abductions" to cast a bad light on the government in order to trigger an international response and cause further imposition of sanctions against the government, with possible military intervention. Mutodi went on to suggest that the reported abduction of the three women in May 2020 may have been carried out by some members of their own political party.

On 10 June 2020, Chimbiri and the two other women were arrested at their lawyers' offices on charges of "communicating or publishing false statement prejudicial to the state" and "defeating or obstructing the course of justice"; more specifically, they were accused of lying about their abduction and torture. They were initially remanded in custody until 26 June, and were then released subject to various bail conditions, including bail of ZWD $10,000, regular reporting to the police and prohibiting them from discussing the alleged incident.

== See also ==
- List of kidnappings
- Lists of solved missing person cases
