= 2018 Bulawayo bombing =

Bomb explosion in Bulawayo, Zimbabwe

Coordinates: 20.145°S 28.528°E

White City bombing
- Location: Bulawayo, Zimbabwe
- Date: 23 June 2018; 8 years ago 14:00 (CAT)
- Target: Emmerson Mnangagwa
- Attack type: Bombing
- Weapon: Grenade
- Deaths: 2
- Injuries: 47
- Perpetrator: Unidentified

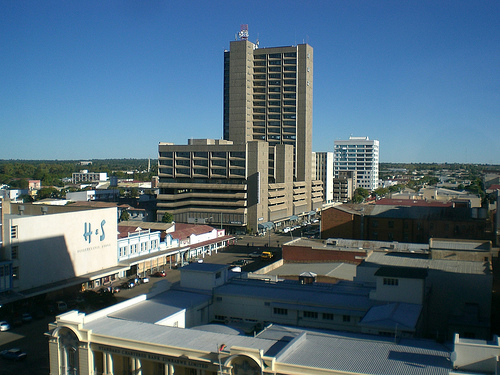
Bulawayo, where the blast occurred

On 23 June 2018, a grenade exploded at White City Stadium in Bulawayo, Zimbabwe. The blast occurred at a ZANU–PF campaign rally, just after President Emmerson Mnangagwa had finished giving a speech. It was described as an assassination attempt against Mnangagwa, who was unharmed. The bombing resulted in at least 49 injured, including Vice-Presidents Constantino Chiwenga and Kembo Mohadi, and other high-ranking government officials. Two security agents later died of their injuries.

The bombing was widely condemned in Zimbabwe and abroad by politicians of both ZANU–PF and opposition parties, and by other public figures. In an interview with the BBC several days after the blast, Mnangagwa blamed the attack on former First Lady Grace Mugabe's G40 faction within ZANU–PF, while stopping short of blaming Mugabe directly. On 27 June 2018, the Zimbabwe Defence Forces stated that they had arrested an individual on the day of the attack. Two more suspects were later arrested, but released without charges.

== Background ==
On the evening of 14 November 2017, elements of the Zimbabwe Defence Forces (ZDF) gathered around Harare, the capital of Zimbabwe, and seized control of the Zimbabwe Broadcasting Corporation and key areas of the city. The next day, the ZDF issued a statement saying that it was not a coup d'état and that President Robert Mugabe was safe, although the situation would return to normal only after the ZDF had dealt with the "criminals" around Mugabe responsible for the socio-economic problems of Zimbabwe.

The uprising took place amid tensions in the ruling ZANU–PF party between former First Vice-President Emmerson Mnangagwa (who was backed by the ZDF and the party's Lacoste faction) and First Lady Grace Mugabe (who was backed by the younger G40 faction) over who would succeed the 93-year-old President Mugabe. A week after Mnangagwa was fired and forced to flee the country, and a day before troops moved into Harare, Zimbabwe Defence Forces chief Constantino Chiwenga issued a statement that purges of senior ZANU–PF officials like Mnangagwa had to stop. On 19 November, ZANU-PF removed Mugabe as party leader, replacing him with Mnangagwa. Mugabe resigned the presidency on 21 November 2017. Mnangagwa was sworn in as President on 24 November 2017.

== Explosion ==
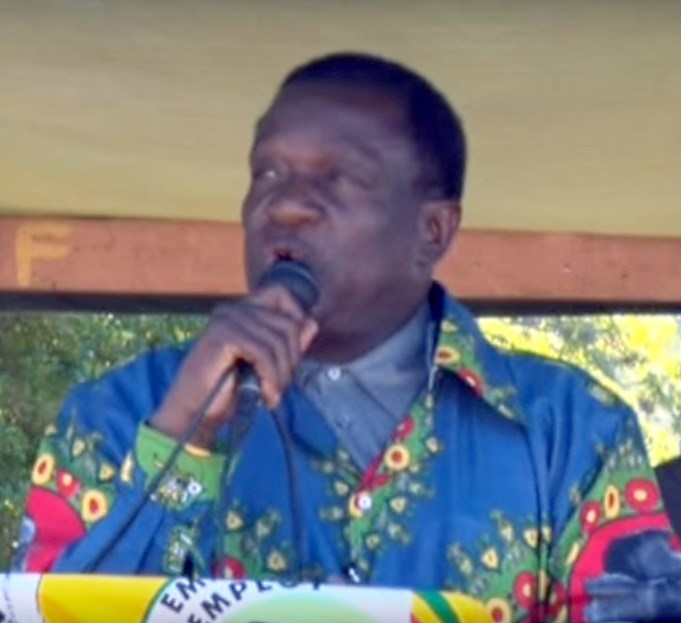
President Emmerson Mnangagwa, shown here speaking at a 2015 rally, was the target of the attack.

On the afternoon of Saturday, 23 June 2018, Zimbabwe's ruling party, ZANU–PF, was holding a campaign rally at White City Stadium in Bulawayo, the country's second largest city and an opposition stronghold. The rally, which was attended by several thousand people, was held to garner support for the party ahead of the July general elections. It was Mnangagwa's first rally in Bulawayo, which the party has not won since the 2000 elections.

The blast occurred in afternoon, shortly after President Emmerson Mnangagwa had finished giving a speech. As Mnangagwa and other party leaders walked offstage to enter a VIP tent, a grenade exploded, creating a cloud of smoke and knocking over people standing close by. Mnangagwa, who was close to the blast but was unhurt, was rushed away by security personnel, while the crowds began running in all directions. Red Cross medics rushed in, treating and evacuating the wounded. State television immediately cut their broadcast after the blast.

=== Casualties ===
The bombing injured 49 people, two of whom died two days later, on 25 June. The two deceased were Central Intelligence Organisation security personnel; Colour Sergeant Stanley Mugunzva of the Presidential Guard, who was assigned to Vice-President Chiwenga, and Nelson Dube, an aide to Vice-President Mohadi. A Zimbabwe Republic Police spokesperson state that while the number of injured was official recorded at 49, it could be larger if there were other victims who did not seek medical care. Four security personnel and several chiefs were injured in the blast. While most of the victims sustained minor injuries and were discharged within hours, health officials warned that some are still in critical condition and that the death toll could rise.

Among the injured were leading government and party officials. Constantino Chiwenga, the First Vice-President of Zimbabwe and a major figure in the 2017 coup, had minor injuries, as did his wife Marry, who sustained lacerations to her face while trying to rescue one of her aides who had shrapnel in her stomach. Second Vice-President Kembo Mohadi was also hospitalized with injuries to his legs. Oppah Muchinguri, the national chairperson of ZANU–PF and the environmental minister, had one of her breasts ripped off by the blast and was in a state of shock. Deputy Speaker of the House of Assembly and ZANU–PF Women's League leader Mabel Chinomona was also injured, as was ZANU–PF National Political Commissar Engelbert Rugeje, who received shrapnel in his arm.

Constantino and Marry Chiwenga, Mabel Chinomona, and Engelbert Rugeje were discharged in the days after the attack, while Kembo Mohadi and Oppah Muchinguri suffered more serious injuries and remained in treatment longer. On Tuesday, 26 June, Mohadi was airlifted to South Africa for treatment. Mohadi, whose legs were injured in the blast, was reported to be in stable condition, though physicians experienced difficulty treating his hypertension. On 27 June, Muchinguri was also flown to South Africa, where she underwent orthopedic and reconstructive surgery. Muchinguri required treatment to address her left breast, which was ripped off by the blast, as well as psychological care and counseling.

Vice-President Chiwenga chose to forgo immediate medical treatment so that he could fully participate in campaigning in the run-up to the 2018 elections. On 9 October 2018, Chiwenga and his wife flew to South Africa for medical treatment, where their injuries were reviewed. In addition to injuries sustained from the Bulawayo bombing, Chiwenga also had a bullet lodged in his leg from a separate incident. They remain in the hospital as of 15 October, although their medical review has been completed. Chiwenga remained in daily contact with President Mnangagwa and was expected to return to Zimbabwe later that week.

== Aftermath ==
Immediately after the blast, Mnangagwa was rushed away from the scene by his security personnel. His motorcade drove him to safety at the Bulawayo State House. Victims of the blast were evacuated to Mater Dei Hospital in Bulawayo, and Mnangagwa visited them there hours later. Later, the injured were moved to Manyame Air Base hospital in Harare.

Presidential spokesman George Charamba told the state-owned Sunday Mail that the general elections scheduled for 30 July 2018 will be held as planned despite the blast, and said that a state of emergency would not be declared.

=== Domestic reactions ===
Shortly after the bombing, the attack was widely denounced by politicians and other public figures in Zimbabwe, while the media, beginning with the state-run Herald newspaper, soon labeled the attack an assassination attempt against President Mnangagwa. In an interview with the Zimbabwe Broadcasting Corporation hours after the blast, Mnangagwa called the attack "cowardly", offered his thoughts and prayers to the victims, and insisted that the violence would not prevent the upcoming elections from being held. He said that the attack occurred "inches" from him, but said "it is not my time", noting that after a number of previous attempts on his life, he was used to it. Without elaborating, he said the perpetrators must have come from "outside Bulawayo", adding "I can assure you these are my normal enemies."

The attack was condemned by politicians of both ZANU–PF and opposition parties. First Vice-President Constantino Chiwenga, who sustained minor injuries in the blast, called the attack an "act of terror" and echoed Mnangagwa, adding that the blast would not affect the elections. Foreign Minister Sibusiso Moyo and former Vice President Joice Mujuru called for peace. Opposition leader and MDC–T presidential candidate Nelson Chamisa condemned the attack and urged the expunction of political violence in Zimbabwe. Other opposition politicians condemning the attack and offering condolences included former Finance Minister Tendai Biti, Senator David Coltart, MP Temba Mliswa, and lawyer and former MDC–T official Alex Magaisa. Notable civilians who denounced the attack included author and filmmaker Tsitsi Dangarembga, musician Thomas Mapfumo, businessman and philanthropist Strive Masiyiwa and his wife, newspaper publisher Trevor Ncube, and exiled judge Ben Paradza. Exiled former ZANU–PF government minister and G40 member Jonathan Moyo, who was expelled during the 2017 coup d'état, took a less sympathetic approach, comparing the blast to the November coup and tweeting "Violence begets violence." Patrick Zhuwao, also an exiled G40 politician, urged British Prime Minister Theresa May to dispatch Scotland Yard to investigate the attack, citing the United States's deployment of Federal Bureau of Investigation personnel to investigate a bombing in Ethiopia that happened on the same day.

Several days after the blast, several prominent ZANU–PF members, including President Mnangagwa, claimed that the attack was an "inside job" by dissident ZANU–PF members, and began directing blame towards members of the party's G40 faction. Prior to the 2017 coup, G40 was allied with former First Lady Grace Mugabe, who was Mnangagwa's rival to succeed her husband Robert Mugabe as President. On 26 June, a spokesman for the Zimbabwe National Liberation War Veterans Association (ZNLWVA), a Rhodesian Bush War veterans' group allied with ZANU–PF, told journalists that the ZNLWVA condemned the attack, demanded that police release more information, and argued "the evil political machinations of G40... cannot be ruled out as suspects." Puparai Togarepi, secretary of the ZANU–PF Youth League, told journalists in Harare that they also believed "enemies surrounding Mnangagwa" were responsibly for the bombing. An exiled former G40 member and cabinet minister, Jonathan Moyo, tweeted that the attack "smacks of an inside job".

Mnangagwa himself, in a 27 June interview with the BBC, said that he believed the G40 faction was responsible for the attack. Though he admitted this claim was a "hunch without evidence", he argued that it was "the logical and reasonable conclusion". Mnangagwa did direct blame at Grace Mugabe, who was in Singapore at the time of the blast, but said that she was "politically immature and was easily used as a tool by those who wanted to get at me." The president added that concern about instability in Zimbabwe was unfounded and that the attack would not result in a security crackdown.

At a 27 June event, ZANU–PF, the MDC–T, and several other parties signed a peace pledge ahead of the July elections, promising to refrain from hate speech and violence. There, Minister of Home Affairs and Culture Obert Mpofu, whose son was injured by the blast, condemned the "evil deed" and urged Zimbabweans not to capitalize on the grief of victims and their families. Speaking at the same event, Zimbabwe Human Rights Commission chair Elasto Mugwadi denounced the attack, adding "in protecting human rights, we all need to protect the sanctity of life." Mugwadi appealed to all political parties to avoid hate speech, "provocative sloganeering" and emotional appeals.

=== International reactions ===
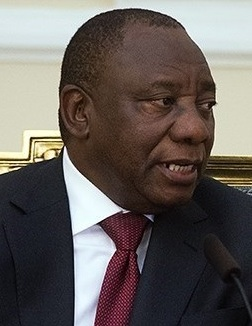
South African President Cyril Ramaphosa said the Southern Africa Development Community, of which he is the chair, would evaluate the matter.

The bombing was widely denounced internationally. Via Twitter, the Harare embassies of Australia, the Netherlands, the United Kingdom, as well as the European Union's European External Action Service all condemned the attack and offered thoughts and prayers to the victims. South African President Cyril Ramaphosa condemned the bombing, stating that acts of violence and criminality had no place in the democratic process. Ramaphosa, who is also chair of the Southern African Development Community, said that the SADC would evaluate the matter and "take appropriate steps". At the 43rd Plenary Assembly Session of the SADC Parliamentary Forum in Luanda, Angolan President João Lourenço denounced the bombing as "cowardly, criminal, and undemocratic", adding that he saw the attacks in Bulawayo and Addis Ababa as efforts to undermine democratic elections in Zimbabwe and Ethiopia. The government of China also condemned the attack in a statement, adding that it hoped for continued stability and peaceful elections in Zimbabwe. Dewa Mavinhinga, Southern Africa director of Human Rights Watch, raised concerns that the bombing could trigger more political violence in an election year that, thus far, had been unmarred by the violence seen before previous elections. In a 29 June statement, former Botswana President Ian Khama condemned the bombing.

== Investigations ==
=== 2018 investigations ===
The Zimbabwe National Army, along with the Zimbabwe Republic Police, clashed during investigations

On the day of the attack, the Zimbabwe Republic Police offered an unspecified reward for information leading to the arrest of the perpetrator of the bombing. A police spokesperson said that crime scene investigators were examining the matter. In the days after the attack, unverified details and explanations regarding the attack were reported. One source reported that an explosive was placed underneath the stage on which Mnangagwa was standing, while another source quoted a woman in attendance at the rally who claimed she saw a young child throw a "package" at the stage just prior to the explosion. According to the woman's claim, which is uncorroborated, the child approached the state and asked to read a poem in praise of Mnangagwa, and was held back by security personnel but pushed through them and threw something towards the stage.

On Wednesday, 27 June, 35 security and investigative personnel met in Harare to discuss the investigations. Later that day, police released new details about the perpetrator and details of the attack. After the blast, police interviewed witnesses, a number of whom reported that they saw the same man throw an object at the stage. Police described the suspect as a young male "between the ages of 23 and 25", about 1.7 meters tall and of dark complexion, who was wearing a yellow ZANU–PF T-shirt at the time of the attack. Witnesses told police that the man lobbed an item towards the stage from about 30 to 35 meters away, but the item missed its target after hitting a rope and then bouncing off a security officer's cheek before landing and detonating. The suspect was allegedly "fiddling around" with the object before throwing it. After the blast, police and military went after him, but witnesses said they saw soldiers get to him first and arrest him, police reported. The suspect has not been seen since the military apprehended him in the townships outside White City Stadium.

The 27 June meeting highlighted rivalries between the Zimbabwe Defence Forces and the Zimbabwe Republic Police amidst the ongoing investigations. Presidential spokesman George Charamba noted that "unresolved leadership issues" were affecting investigations. These internal conflicts within ZANU–PF and between different security forces were paralleled by alleged tensions between President Mnangagwa and Vice-President Chiwenga, the former Commander of the Defence Forces and a major figure in the 2017 coup.

Internal rivalries between Zimbabwean security forces were exacerbated, not alleviated, by the military's arrest of the alleged perpetrator. The military had not responded to the Zimbabwe Republic Police's requests for confirmation of the suspect's detainment, nor to police requests for their Criminal Investigations Department to interview the suspect. Police officials told the Zimbabwe Independent that although they had found some good leads through witness interviews, they lack access to the suspect, so the investigations cannot "proceed properly." Currently, investigative units from the military, the police's Criminal Investigation Department, and the Central Intelligence Organisation are based in Bulawayo to investigate the attack. Current investigations lack coordination between the three groups, and there was even conflict over hotel accommodations for investigators.

Police investigations concluded that the perpetrator must have been someone with some security background and training, and experience handling weapons. Police said that the way the grenade was handled and launched indicated at least basic security training. Police are currently investigating the source of the explosive, which they say could not have come from police, as they no longer use grenades since the November 2017 coup. Weapons experts are analyzing the debris from the explosion to determine what type of grenade was used and where it might have come from. Police say that their inability to question the suspect, who is in military custody, prevents them from asking about the weapon and its origin, and the suspect's motive. They said they thought he may have been a hired hitman.

Investigations show that President Mnangagwa was the likely target of the attack, though investigators have not yet determined with certainty that it was an assassination attempt. Investigators and government officials told the Zimbabwe Independent that had the grenade not deflected off a rope, it likely would have detonated within a fatal distance of Mnangagwa. In a 27 June interview, Mnangagwa stated that he expected arrests to be made soon. Two suspects, residents of Bulawayo's Pumula suburb, reportedly appeared before a magistrate at the Tredgold Magistrates' Court in Bulawayo to answer charges regarding the 23 June bombing. The suspects were identified as John Zulu and Douglas Musekiwa, and it is unclear if one of these men was the suspect arrested by the military the day of the attack. Zulu and Musekiwa were later released without charges.

=== 2024 investigations ===
In July 2024, Mnangagwa ordered a comprehensive investigation into criminal activity targeting him and his family, including the 2018 White City Stadium bombing. The decision followed several incidents in the preceding months, including attempted attacks on Mnangagwa's plane on two separate occasions, as well as break-ins at the homes of Mnangagwa and his son, deputy finance minister David Mnangagwa, and the office of his nephew, deputy tourism minister Tongai Mnangagwa. Concerned that the incidents might be connected, Mnangagwa tasked Zimbabwe Republic Police commissioner Godwin Matanga with creating a special task force to investigate. The investigation was assigned to detective's from the Harare Central Police Station's Law and Order section, in coordination with other agencies.

On 24 July 2024, police released an image of a man suspected of involvement in the 2018 Bulawayo bombing, claiming he was wanted for fraud involving US$300,000. They offered a US$10,000 reward for his positive identification. The man's image was previous circulated internally among police in 2018 and 2019, and published in the state-run Chronicle newspaper, but was never positively identified.

== See also ==
- List of terrorist incidents in June 2018
- List of unsolved murders (2000–present)
