= Generation 40 =

Political faction within ZANU-PF

Generation 40 (G40) was a faction of the Zimbabwe African National Union – Patriotic Front (ZANU–PF), active during the 2010s. The G40 was an informal group of ZANU–PF politicians working on generation change by replacing the older officials of the party. The group promoted itself as the younger, savvy, and well educated ZANU–PF members. It was said to be led by Jonathan Moyo and ZANU–PF political commissar, Saviour Kasukuwere but fronted by Grace Mugabe, the then First Lady of Zimbabwe.

Moyo has claimed he coined the term that was now wrongly used to refer to a ZANU–PF faction. He stated that he first used it in the state-controlled Sunday Mail in August 2011. He stated that he was referring to younger generation of all political affiliations and gender.

Among some of those believed to have been linked to the group were the nephew of Robert Mugabe and the Youth and Indigenisation Minister Patrick Zhuwao, Sports Minister Makhosini Hlongwane, Deputy Minister of Public Service Tapiwa Matangaidze, Deputy Minister of Tourism Annastacia Ndhlovu, Hurungwe East MP Sarah Mahoka, Manicaland former Provincial Affairs Minister and war veteran Mandiitawepi Chimene, Vice-President Phelekezela Mphoko, Minister of Finance Ignatius Chombo, Foreign Minister Walter Mzembi, Minister of Energy and Power Development Samuel Undenge, ZANU–PF's Mashonaland West chairman Keith Guzah, Commissioner General of the Police Augustine Chihuri, Masvingo Provincial Affairs Minister Paul Chimedza, Minister of State for Bulawayo Eunice Sandi Moyo, former ZANU–PF Youth League leader Kudzai Chipanga, Youth League financial secretary Tongai Kasukuwere, political commissar Innocent Hamandishe, secretary for external affairs Mphehlabayo Malinga and women’s league secretary for administration Letina Undenge.

By 19 November 2017, many members of the G40 were expelled from ZANU–PF. This was a result of the coup d'état which also led to the resignation of Robert Mugabe as President on 21 November 2017. Godwin Matanga replaced Augustine Chihuri as the Commissioner-General of Police, with Chihuri retiring. Generation 40 was rivaled with the Lacoste group within the ZANU–PF which is allied with current President Emmerson Mnangagwa.
