= Zhuwao =

Zhuwao is a surname. Notable people with the surname include:

- Beauty Zhuwao, Zimbabwean politician
- Cephas Zhuwao, Zimbabwean international cricketer
- Jason Zhuwao, Zimbabwean politician
- Patrick Zhuwao, Zimbabwean politician
- Phillip Zhuwao, Zimbabwean poet
