= Beauty Zhuwao =

Zimbabwean politician

Personal details
- Born: 10 January 1965 (age 61)
- Party: ZANU–PF
- Spouse: Patrick Zhuwao
- Children: Jason Zhuwao
- Education: University of Zimbabwe

Beauty Lily Zhuwao (/zuːˈwaɪoʊ/; born 10 January 1965) is a Zimbabwean politician and the wife of former government minister Patrick Zhuwao. She is also the daughter-in-law of Sabina Mugabe, the sister of former President Robert Mugabe. Prior to 2015, Zhuwao was active in ZANU–PF politics, serving for several years as the Women's League provincial treasurer for Mashonaland West Province.

== Life and career ==
Zhuwao was born on 10 January 1965.

During the 2008–2009 Zimbabwean political negotiations, Zhuwao was selected to be on the Constitution Select Committee (COPAC), which worked to draft a new Zimbabwean constitution. She was assigned to serve as a rapporteur, gauging public opinion during the constitution-drafting process. In September 2010, Zhuwao assaulted fellow committee member Bednock Nyaude, MDC–T House of Assembly member for Bindura South. Zhuwao assaulted Nyaude outside the offices of the district administrator for Kadoma in Mashonaland West Province. She punched him in the chest after accusing him of insinuating that she had personal issues, a charge Nyaude denied. Following the incident, Nyaude reported the assault at the Kadoma Central police station on 7 September 2010, and also informed COPAC members and MPs Editor Matamisa and Walter Chidakwa. Matamisa, in turn, reported the incident to COPAC co-chairs Paul Mangwana and Douglas Mwonzora. Monzwora said that if found guilty, Zhuwao would be suspended from COPAC.

On 6 February 2011, Zhuwao was defeated by Tsitsi Mugabe in the election for chair of ZANU–PF's Zvimba District coordinating committee. Mugabe received 26 votes to Zhuwao's 14.

In October 2014, Zhuwao became involved in the heated ZANU–PF succession infighting between Vice-President Joice Mujuru and then-Minister of Justice Emmerson Mnangagwa. During what her husband described as a coup attempt, Zhuwao slapped ZANU–PF Mashonaland West provincial chairman Temba Mliswa after a tense verbal exchange. She reportedly slapped Mliswa, who did not retaliate, once, before others present intervened. Reports of the incident soon went viral on the internet. At a meeting with top government officials days later, President Robert Mugabe reportedly denied that a coup attempt occurred, expressed disapproval of the incident, and apologized to Mliswa on Zhuwao's behalf. Mugabe also reportedly questioned Media Minister Jonathan Moyo as to why Mliswa was being portrayed in state media as the aggressor when he was the victim of the assault. Zhuwao confirmed the incident but refused to comment, saying she would later issue a statement.

In July 2015, Zhuwao stepped down from her post as ZANU–PF Mashonaland West provincial Women's League treasurer due to pressure from fellow party members, who accused her of refusing to sign a petition that led to the ouster of acting provincial chair Ziyambi Ziyambi. Zhuwao was reportedly seen as a Ziyambi supporter and was thus targeted by Ziyambi opponents. Zhuwao confirmed that she had resigned, but said that the move was not related to politics and that she had stepped down to study at the University of Zimbabwe.

Zhuwao is married to exiled former ZANU–PF politician Patrick Zhuwao. Their son Jason Zhuwao is also a politician. She was placed on the United States sanctions list in 2005.
