= Patrick Zhuwao =

Zimbabwean politician

Minister of Public Service, Labour and Social Welfare
- In office 9 October 2017 – 27 November 2017
- President: Robert Mugabe; Emmerson Mnangagwa
- Preceded by: Prisca Mupfumira
- Succeeded by: Clever Nyathi

Minister of Youth Development, Indigenisation and Economic Empowerment
- In office 11 September 2015 – 9 October 2017
- President: Robert Mugabe
- Deputy: Mathias Tongofa
- Preceded by: Christopher Mushohwe
- Succeeded by: Chiratidzo Mabuwa

Member of Parliament
- In office 2008–2013
- Succeeded by: Francis Mukwangwariwa
- Constituency: Zvimba East

Personal details
- Born: 23 May 1967 (age 59)
- Party: ZANU–PF (expelled 2017)
- Spouse: Beauty Zhuwao
- Relations: Innocent Mugabe (brother); Leo Mugabe (brother); Robert Mugabe (uncle)
- Children: Jason Zhuwao
- Parent: Sabina Mugabe (mother)
- Education: University of Zimbabwe

Patrick Zhuwao (/zuːˈwaɪoʊ/; born 23 May 1967) is a Zimbabwean businessman, farmer, and politician. He served as minister of public service, labour and social welfare between October and November 2017. He was expelled from the ruling ZANU–PF party during the 2017 Zimbabwean coup d'état.

Zhuwao was born in 1967 to Sabina Mugabe and a Mozambican father. His uncle is former Zimbabwean President Robert Mugabe. He studied at the University of Zimbabwe, where he earned two bachelor's degrees and four master's degrees. Zhuwao went on to become a tobacco farmer and businessman, with interests in several parastatals. He also founded a think tank, the Zhuwao Institute, which focused on economic development and was aligned with the policies of President Mugabe.

Zhuwao entered politics in 2007 when President Mugabe appointed him deputy minister of youth. A year later, he was elected to the House of Assembly for the Zvimba East constituency and was appointed deputy minister of science and technology, a position he held until 2012. In 2013, he was defeated in the ZANU–PF primaries for reelection to Parliament. In 2015, he was named minister of youth development, indigenisation and economic empowerment. In October 2017, he was appointed minister of public service, labour and social welfare. In November 2017, he was expelled from ZANU–PF due to his association with First Lady Grace Mugabe and her Generation 40 faction. He is now living in exile in South Africa.

== Early life and education ==
Zhuwao was born on 23 May 1967 to Sabina Mugabe and a Mozambican father. He is the brother of Innocent Mugabe, the former head of the Central Intelligence Organisation, and Leo Mugabe, a businessman and politician. Zhuwao is the only son of Sabina Mugabe who did not use her maiden name as his surname.

He studied at the University of Zimbabwe, where he earned two bachelor's degrees and four master's degrees. He holds a Bachelor of Science in computer systems engineering, a Bachelor of Science in economics, a Master of Business Administration in information technology management, a Master of Management, a Master of Public and Development Management, and a Master of Science in economics. He earned his most recent degree, the MS in economics, in September 2014.

== Business career ==
Zhuwao owns Norton Tobacco Farm in Norton, Mashonaland West Province. He was said to have been involved in a salary dispute at Norton Farm when he allegedly went three months without paying the workers. Zhuwao confirmed the incident but said that because he was in the tobacco industry, he could only pay employees once the crop had been sold. Zhuwao also owned another tobacco and livestock farm, Diandra Farm, allocated to him by the government on 9 December 2004.

Zhuwao also has business interests in Telecel Zimbabwe, a telecommunication firm that is Zimbabwe's second largest mobile phone operator, through the Empowerment Corporation of Zimbabwe, of which he is a stakeholder. In August 2013, he played a pivotal role in restoring Telecel Zimbabwe's license. Two months earlier, the Postal and Telecommunications Regulatory Authority of Zimbabwe did not renew the company's expired license due to its failure to comply with Zimbabwe's indigenisation policy, which "requires that all foreign firms in Zimbabwe give up the majority of their ownership to black Zimbabweans". To help the firm renew its license, Zhuwao stepped in to reach a deal in which Telecel Zimbabwe made plans to comply with the indigenisation policy. Reportedly, Zhuwao himself planned to make himself the company's main shareholder, but reportedly the government did not agree to allow this. Nevertheless, the government renewed the firm's license, though Zhuwao said that his connection to President Mugabe was not a factor.

In 2014, he was named chairman of the newly created board of directors of the parastatal Zimbabwe Power Company by Minister of Energy and Power Development Dzikamai Mavhaire.

In 2014, Zhuwao started his own think tank, the Zhuwao Institute. The Harare-based institute focused on research and economic development. The think tank was described by Ken Mufuka in The Financial Gazette as having "jumped on the governmental bandwagon" for its association with the policies of Robert Mugabe.

== Political career ==
Zhuwao entered politics in July 2007 when President Robert Mugabe appointed him Deputy Minister of Youth. His appointment was criticized by some as an example of nepotism, because Zhuwao is Mugabe's nephew. Zhuwao was placed on the United States sanctions list in 2005. In 2008, Zhuwao was elected to the Zimbabwe House of Assembly for the Zvimba East constituency, as a member of ZANU–PF. Bybit Lydia Tsomondo had dropped out of the race, clearing the way for him to run. From 2008 to 2012, he served as Deputy Minister of Science and Technology. In 2010, Zhuwao became a member of the Politburo of ZANU–PF and the youth director of the party.

In the 2013 parliamentary election, Zhuwao was defeated in the Zvimba East ZANU–PF primaries by Francis Mukwangwariwa, a farmer and former Central Intelligence Organisation operative.

In October 2014, Zhuwao became involved in the heated ZANU–PF succession infighting between Vice-President Joice Mujuru and then-Minister of Justice Emmerson Mnangagwa. In an article published in state media, Zhuwao claimed that during a "coup" attempt at the residence of President Mugabe a week earlier, his wife Beauty Zhuwao slapped ZANU–PF Mashonaland West provincial chairman Temba Mliswa after a tense verbal exchange. She reportedly slapped Mliswa, who did not retaliate, once, before others present intervened. Reports of the incident soon went viral on the internet. At a meeting with top government officials days later, Mugabe reportedly denied that a coup attempt occurred, expressed disapproval of the incident, and apologized to Mliswa on Beauty Zhuwao's behalf. Mugabe also reportedly questioned media minister Jonathan Moyo why Mliswa was being portrayed in state media as the aggressor when in reality, he was the victim of the assault.

In December 2014, South African businessman Mutumwa Mawere threatened Zhuwao with legal action over "defamatory statements" Zhuwao wrote about him in a newspaper article. In the op-ed, published in The Sunday Mail, Zhuwao described Mawere as "ideologically bankrupt, devoid of ethics, morality and decency".

On 11 September 2015, Zhuwao was appointed Minister of Youth Development, Indigenisation and Economic Empowerment by President Mugabe. He succeeded Christopher Mushohwe, who went on to become Minister of Information.

On 21 July 2016, Zhuwao was ordered out of the Parliament building after he failed to respond to questioning during a portfolio committee session. Zhuwao had been called before the committee to answer questions about an allegedly corrupt deal he had brokered when he hired a private consultancy firm, whose owner Zhuwao had a personal relationship with, to spearhead Zimbabwe's National Economic Empowerment Strategy. At his questioning session before the committee on 21 July, Zhuwao engaged in a heated exchange with committee chair Justice Mayor Wadyajena. Other Members of Parliament accused Zhuwao of being under of the influence of drugs as he would occasionally burst out in "hysterical" laughter and declined to answer questions, only repeating the statement, "My name is Patrick Zhuwao, and can you allow me to respond in a manner that Patrick Zhuwao responds?" Wadyajena told Zhuwao to excuse himself if he was not ready to answer the questions. After a lengthy exchange, the committee asked Zhuwao to leave the chamber and return when he was "sober and when he understood the questions and issues involved." Some lawmakers said they were surprised by his conduct, noting that in their previous interactions with him he had always been articulate.

On 9 October 2017, Zhuwao was appointed Minister of Public Service, Labour and Social Welfare of Zimbabwe. He announced on 10 November that government employees would be receiving bonuses.

=== 2017 coup d'état and aftermath ===
On 11 November 2017, it was often incorrectly reported that Zhuwao was taken into custody by the Zimbabwean military in relation to the 2017 coup d'état. The reports that he was arrested were false; Zhuwao was in fact returning from a foreign trip, but changed his plans after hearing about the coup. On 19 November 2017, Zhuwao was expelled from ZANU–PF by the party's central committee. Other prominent G40 politicians, including Grace Mugabe, Saviour Kasukuwere, Jonathan Moyo, Ignatius Chombo, Walter Mzembi, Shadreck Mashayamombe, Makhosini Hlongwane, Innocent Hamandishe, Samuel Undenge, and Sarah Mahoka were also expelled from the party. Even after fleeing the country, Zhuwao continued defending Robert Mugabe, calling the president's critics "dumb" and saying that the president was "willing to die for what is correct." ZANU–PF spokesman Nick Mangwana responded that Zhuwao should stop making "inflammatory" remarks.

On 27 November 2017, Mugabe's successor Emmerson Mnangagwa dissolved the cabinet, keeping only Patrick Chinamasa and Simbarashe Mumbengegwi as acting ministers of Finance until a new cabinet was named. In a December 2017 phone interview with The Standard, Zhuwao reported that during the coup, his farm was looted and his workers were beaten. He said that he was proud to have served in Mugabe's government, but that he was quitting politics and remaining in South Africa for the time being out of safety concerns. He said, "People can say I ran away. Yes, I did. It's better than to wait to be killed."

After the 2018 Bulawayo bombing, Zhuwao published an open letter to British Prime Minister Theresa May in which he urged her to dispatch Scotland Yard to Zimbabwe to investigate the attack. Zhuwao cited the example of the United States, which sent Federal Bureau of Investigation personnel to Ethiopia to investigate a bombing in Addis Ababa that happened on the same day as the Bulawayo bombing.

As of 2020, Zhuwao was reportedly studying towards a Doctor of Philosophy degree in digital business, with a focus on digital agriculture, at the University of the Witwatersrand Business School in Johannesburg. That year, Zhuwao's 827-hectare Diandra Farm, located in Mashonaland West Province, was seized by order of the Ministry of Agriculture. Zhuwao has remained in exile since the 2017 coup, citing fear of retribution in Zimbabwe due to the "pettiness of Mnangagwa."

== Personal life ==
Zhuwao is married to Beauty Lily Zhuwao. His son, Jason Zhuwao, is also active in ZANU–PF politics and was reported to be planning to run for Parliament in the Harare Central constituency against MDC–T leader Murisi Zvidzai.
