= Linda Masarira =

Zimbabwean politician (1982–2026)

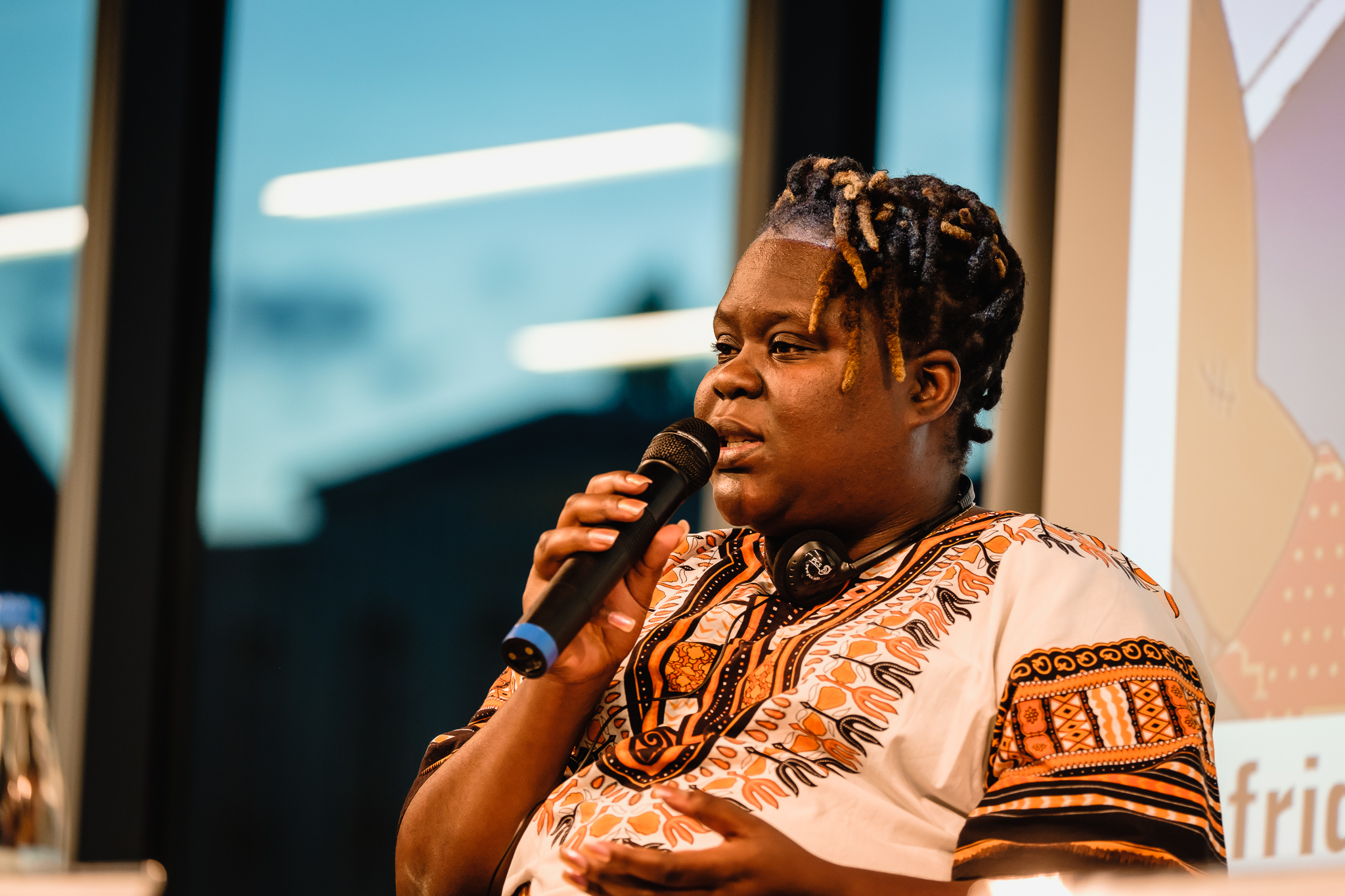
- Masarira in 2017
- Born: 3 October 1982; Harare, Zimbabwe
- Died: 24 May 2026 (aged 43)
- Other name: Tsungirirayi
- Occupation: Politician
- Years active: 2015–2026
- Known for: Human rights activism
- Children: 5

Linda Tsungirirai Masarira (3 October 1982 – 24 May 2026) was a Zimbabwean politician who served as a spokesperson for one of the smaller factions of the opposition parties in Zimbabwe, MDC-T led by Thokozani Khupe.

Masarira was also a human rights activist who was known for her role in advocating for democracy, equality, gender balance, women and girl child rights, inclusion and economic and political freedom for marginalised groups of society. She was the founder and president of the Zimbabwean political party Labor Economists and African Democrats (LEAD) as well as a member of the group Political Actors Dialogue (POLAD).

She made headlines when she blasted sick Mary Mubaiwa who used to be a wife of a professional footballer Shingi Kawondera after their break up, Mary Mubaiwa wedded the then Army General Constantino Guvheya Nyikadzino Chiwenga who is the current serving vice president of Zimbabwe. Mary and Chiwenga broke up.

== Background ==
Linda Masarira grew up in Harare where she was based before moving to Bulawayo, Hwange and Mutare where she was employed as a train woman. She returned to Harare in 2015 and then formed the Zimbabwe Women In Politics Alliance.

Masarira died on 24 May 2026, at the age of 43.

== Human rights activism ==
After a series of demonstrations, petitions and protests for human rights violations by the Government of Zimbabwe during the Mugabe regime which she organised, she was incarcerated for more than 80 days in Chikurubhi Maximum Prison for challenging the government to respect humanity. During her days of incarceration, Masarira mobilised fellow women prisoners and led an inmate protest against poor conditions that women were facing including lack of sanitary pads and proper access to medical services. Because of her activism, Masarira was brutalised and moved to a male prison where she was placed on solitary confinement until she was finally granted bail by a High court order in September 2016.

Masarira organised a series of several successful campaigns including the “Bring back our women from Kuwait” campaign where she took a leading role in petitioning the government of Zimbabwe and the Kuwaiti Embassy to expedite the repatriation process to the stranded Zimbabwean women who had fallen victim to human trafficking. Following this campaign, the government of Zimbabwe later came up with an expatriation plan for all trafficked persons outside Zimbabwe which saw more than 200 women victims coming back home.

She and her five other allies including Lynette Tendai Mudehwe of Zimbabwe Activists Alliance launched the Occupy Africa Unity Square Campaign in June 2016, which was organised to run for 16 days. The campaign was crushed by Zimbabwe Republic Police who then arrested fellow activist Patson Dzamara and several other campaign members for made up robbery charges. Masarira then got arrested on a charge of obstructing the course of justice.

During her time at National Railways of Zimbabwe and Systems Technology, Linda was also involved in trade unionism where she mobilised other employees to fight for their labour rights, which got her fired from the organisations.

Masarira said challenges she faced as a young Zimbabwean is what shaped her opinions and these challenges include gender and justice, labor and justice as well as social injustice.

== Political career ==
Masarira was a member of the executive management committee of the People's Democratic Party (PDP) responsible for recruitment and mobilization. She was the spokesperson of the Movement for Democratic Change (MDC-T) led by President Dr Thokozani Khupe.

In June 2018, Linda successfully registered to contest for the Harare Central parliamentary seat in the 2018 elections driven by her gender equality and conviction that she can make a difference for all workers facing labour injustice in Zimbabwe.

In October 2021, Masarira argued over Twitter that the Zimbabwean Electoral Commission should raise nomination fees, ranging from 25,000 to 50,000 USD, to create a political space filled with values of higher opinion. However, she herself failed to raise the nomination fund, leading to her being barred from running in the 2023 election as well as receiving mockery over social media.

== Controversy ==
In May 2015, Linda appeared before the Mutare magistrate Annia Ndiraya for allegedly insulting the then President of Zimbabwe Robert Mugabe by referring to him as "shit" of which she denied charges citing that she was framed. She was remanded out of custody on free bail.

2016 in December, Masarira reportedly said "Ndebele people are cowards and cry-babies" at a Crisis in Zimbabwe Coalition conference which was held in Harare. The statement went viral on social media and she was accused of tribalism. Masarira then clarified saying that she meant most Ndebele people were reluctant to participate in efforts to confront the Mugabe regime in fighting for their rights.

In 2017, she sued top government officials including the current president of Zimbabwe Emmerson Mnangagwa who was the Vice President as well as the then Home Affairs minister Ignatius Chombo, ZRP commissioner Augustine Chihuri and prison chief Paradzai Zimondi. She filed a $150,000 lawsuit for unlawful detention over an outstanding warrant of arrest.

In March 2018, she filed papers at the constitutional court challenging the legitimacy of President Emmerson Mnangagwa who ascended into power after 2017 Zimbabwean coup d'état in November 2017.

During the 2018 Workers Day celebrations, she was barred from entering Zimbabwe Congress of Trade Unions VIP tent, Peter Mutasa the ZCTU president said they barred MDC-T spokesperson from sitting in the VIP tent because she wanted to disrupt the Workers’ Day celebrations.

In August 2019, she questioned Julius Malema's involvement in Zimbabwe's politics and declared that "Zimbabwe is a sovereign nation and not an extension of South Africa". She urged him to facilitate the Covid treatment for foreign nationals in South Africa as well as the issuing of Visa documents instead of meddling in Zimbabwean politics. Fadzai Mahere questioned this move by her which led to a spat on Twitter.

In 2022, Masarira was the victim of "hate politics" because of her alleged association with the ZANU-PF party. The attacks consisted of body shaming as well as claims that she did not shower.

== Positions held ==
- Founder and national coordinator for Zimbabwe Women in Politics Alliance.
- National Coordinator for the Young African Leadership Forum (Zimbabwean Chapter).
- Founder and Chairperson of the Association of Railways Terminated Employees.
- Chairperson of the Revolutionary Freedom Fighters.
- Chairperson of STAR fellowship cohort 3.
- FES Alumni.
- Former President of the Trainmen workers Union (2008–2013).

== Awards and recognition ==
- Zimrights Female Human Rights Defender of the year 2016
- Giraffe Award for Human Rights
- Fortune Magazine 2016 5th Most Powerful Woman in the World
- Phenomenal African Woman October 2017
