= Samkange =

Samkange is a surname. Notable people with the surname include:

- Stanlake J. W. T. Samkange (1922–1988), Zimbabwean author
- Thompson Samkange (1893–1956), Zimbabwean minister and political activist, father of Stanlake
