= Zvimba East =

- Constituency for the National Assembly of Zimbabwe
- Province: Mashonaland West
- Region: Zvimba District

Current constituency
- Created: 2008
- Number of members: 1
- Member(s): Vacant

Zvimba East is a constituency represented the National Assembly of the Parliament of Zimbabwe, located in Zvimba District in Mashonaland West Province. The seat is currently vacant following the November 2023 recall of Oliver Mutasa (Citizens Coalition for Change), the constituency's MP since the 2023 election. A by-election is scheduled to take place in February 2024.

== History ==
Zvimba East was created for the 2008 election, along with Zvimba West. Previously, Zvimba District was divided between only two constituencies, Zvimba North and Zvimba South. That year, Patrick Zhuwao of ZANU–PF was elected as the constituency's first MP. In 2013, Zhuwao lost the ZANU–PF primary to Francis Mukwangwariwa, who went on to win the general election. In the 2018 election, ZANU–PF's Tawanda Tungamirai was elected to represent the constituency.

In the 2023 election, Oliver Mutasa of the newly-formed Citizens Coalition for Change won in Zvimba East by a margin of 189 votes against ex-Central Intelligence Organisation operative and former MP for the constituency, Francis Mukwangwariwa. Mutasa was recalled from Parliament on 14 November 2023 by the CCC's purported interim secretary-general Sengezo Tshabangu, who wrote to Speaker Jacob Mudenda telling him that Mutasa was no longer a member of the party.

By-elections are scheduled for 3 February 2024 in Zvimba East and five other constituencies. On 16 December 2023, ZANU–PF announced that, following primary polls, the party will be represented by Kudakwashe Munhanzva in the upcoming by-election. The CCC will have competing candidates in Zvimba East, with recalled MP Mutasa, representing the faction loyal to Nelson Chamisa, set to contest the election as an independent against Konjana Gift Machoka, the official CCC candidate representing the Sengezo Tshabangu camp of the party.

== Members ==
Election	Name	Party
2008	Patrick Zhuwao	ZANU–PF
2013	Francis Mukwangwariwa	ZANU–PF
2018	Tawanda Tungamirai	ZANU–PF
2023	Oliver Mutasa	CCC
2024 by-election	TBD	

== See also ==
- List of Zimbabwean parliamentary constituencies
