= Alex Magaisa =

Zimbabwean lawyer (1975–2022)

Advisor to the Prime Minister
- In office October 2012 – July 2013
- Prime Minister: Morgan Tsvangirai

Personal details
- Born: 10 August 1975 Charter District, Rhodesia (now Chikomba District, Zimbabwe)
- Died: 5 June 2022 (aged 46) Margate, Kent, England
- Party: Movement for Democratic Change – Tsvangirai
- Education: University of Zimbabwe (LL.B.); University of Warwick (Ph.D)

Alex Tawanda Magaisa (10 August 1975 – 6 June 2022) was a Zimbabwean academic and lecturer of law at the Kent Law School of the University of Kent. He served as the Advisor (Chief of Staff) of the then Prime Minister of Zimbabwe Morgan Tsvangirai from 2012-2013. Prior to becoming Advisor to the Prime Minister, Magaisa had been working as a core member of a team of experts tasked to advise on the drafting of the new Constitution of Zimbabwe. He is known for his legal, political and social commentary work on issues affecting Zimbabwe and other developing nations through his blog The Big Saturday Read. His work was sometimes featured by Zimbabwean news outlets including The Standard, Daily News, Newzimbabwe.com, and The Herald.

== Family and early childhood ==
Magaisa was born in Chikomba District, Zimbabwe (then known as Charter District, Rhodesia). He completed his high school education attending boarding school at St. Francis of Assisi High School in the Mashonaland East province. He then matriculated at the University of Zimbabwe, graduating in 1997 with a Bachelor of Laws degree. During his time at the University of Zimbabwe he met and influenced future founders of the Movement for Democratic Change; the likes of Learnmore Jongwe, Job Sikhala, and Nelson Chamisa the last of whom was then studying at Harare Polytechnic.He was married to Shamiso Magaisa, a chartered accountant, whom he had two sons with.

== Early career ==
After graduating from University of Zimbabwe, Magaisa joined one of the prestigious law firms in Zimbabwe, Gill Godlonton & Gerrans Legal Practitioners as an Associate. Later in 1999, he went on to pursue graduate studies at University of Warwick in the United Kingdom where he graduated with a PhD in Law in 2003. Magaisa then worked as a regulatory enforcement manager for Jersey Financial Services Commission, the financial services regulator in Jersey until 2007. In September 2007, he joined the University of Kent Law School as a lecturer and researcher. His main areas of teaching and research were company law, intellectual property law and international financial regulation.

== Technical Advisor to COPAC & Advisor to the Prime Minister of Zimbabwe ==
In November 2011, Magaisa took a leave of absence from the University of Kent to take up a role as a core member of a team of technical experts advising the Constitution Parliamentary Committee (COPAC) which had been set up by the Parliament of Zimbabwe with the mandate of drafting a new constitution to repeal and replace the old Lancaster House Agreement Constitution. The draft was later overwhelmingly approved by almost 95% of those who cast votes in a nationwide referendum held on 16 March 2013. In October 2012, Magaisa left his advisory work with COPAC when he was appointed by Prime Minister Tsvangirai to be his Chief Advisor as preparations for the upcoming 2013 elections were beginning. The MDC lost to ZANU PF by a wide margin in the disputed elections resulting in Magaisa and the MDC legal team filing a Constitutional Court petition seeking the nullification of results, arguing that the elections were not free and fair. However, the petition was later withdrawn and in the process frustrated the judges who bizarrely refused to recognize the withdrawal and insisted on hearing the matter even after the petitioner had withdrawn.

== Criticism ==
=== The Plot Cafe ===
In July 2017, Magaisa was embroiled in controversy after a local state owned media outlet published a picture of him with Zanu PF government ministers Jonathan Moyo, Saviour Kasukuwere and Patrick Zhuwao at a local restaurant called "Plot Cafe". He reluctantly issued a response explaining the circumstances of how the picture was taken dispelling the conspiracy theories that were starting to gain ground.

== In media ==
Magaisa appears in the documentary Democrats directed by Camilla Nielsson which captured the tumultuous constitution making process over a period of three years.

== Death ==
On 5 June 2022, it was confirmed by several of his colleagues that Magaisa had died at Queen Elizabeth, Queen Mother Hospital in Margate, the United Kingdom following a cardiac arrest. He was laid to rest on 28 June 2022, in his home village of Mangisi in Njanja
