= Joint Operations Command (Zimbabwe) =

The Joint Operations Command (JOC) is the supreme organ for the coordination of state security in Zimbabwe. It was established by the Rhodesian Security Forces as Combined Operations Headquarters to supervise its counter-insurgency campaign in the Rhodesian Bush War as well as external incursions into neighbouring countries such as Zambia and Mozambique. The JOC retained its role in the post-independence Zimbabwe Defence Forces, and has since been accused of manipulating elections and orchestrating political violence.

== 2008 ==
The JOC was headed in 2008 by Minister of State Security Didymus Mutasa, but he was replaced soon after the Zimbabwean presidential election held on 29 March 2008, by the Minister of Rural Housing and Social Amenities Emmerson Mnangagwa. The JOC has been accused of organising repression campaigns against both opposition partisans, civil society and the U.S. ambassador.

It has been claimed that in the wake of the Zimbabwean presidential election, the JOC de facto took over control of the day-to-day decision-making of government, effectively operating as a military junta. The JOC has also been implicated in the violent suppression of opposition supporters between the 29 March election and the runoff election in July 2008.

It has come under scrutiny from members of the Politburo of the ZANU-PF.

=== Membership ===
Members and former members included:

- Oppah Muchinguri – Minister of Defence
- General Philip Valerio Sibanda – Commander of the Zimbabwe Defence Forces
- Lieutenant General Edzai Chimonyo – Commander of the Zimbabwe National Army
- Air Marshal (Elsen Moyo) – Commander of the Air Force of Zimbabwe
- Commissioner Godwin Matanga – Commissioner of the Zimbabwe Republic Police
- Major General (Ret.) Paradzayi Zimondi – Head of the Zimbabwe prison service
- Isaac Moyo – Director-General of the Central Intelligence Organisation
- John Mangudya – Governor of the Reserve Bank of Zimbabwe
- Brigadier-General Douglas Nyikayaramba

== Proposed restructuring ==
According to the deal arising out of political negotiations between the three largest political parties, the JOC was to be renamed the National Security Council. It was to be chaired by Robert Mugabe and the former prime minister, Morgan Tsvangirai, was to be a sitting member.
