= Chitomborwizi =

Farming area in Mashonaland West, Zimbabwe

- Province: Mashonaland West
- Country: Zimbabwe
- Owner: Various
- Produces: Maize, cotton, tobacco

Chitomborwizi is a farming area in Mashonaland West in Zimbabwe formerly known as Chitomborwizi African Purchase Area. The farms are small to medium (20 to 100 ha) sizes. Areas like these were created for black farmers during the colonial era, similar areas are Musengezi near Chegutu, Mushagashe near Chatsworth, Zimbabwe, Wilshere in Chivhu, Matepatepa in Mt Darwin to mention just a few.

== Location ==
Chitomborwizi is located about 20 km south of Chinhoyi town (which is the provincial capital) and about 25 km north of Murombedzi. It is sandwiched between Chirau communal lands to the south and former white commercial farms to the north. The area is subdivided into three regions Chitomborwizi East, Central and West. Chitomborwizi east comprises farms which are to the east of Chinhoyi-Chegutu highway. This region is separated to former white commercial farms by Manyame river (pronounced Mhanyaame by local people or Hunyani by white settlers). Some farmers in this area use water from the river which flows throughout the year for irrigation. Manyame river flows into Biri dam which is also used by farmers for irrigation and fishing. It is not all farmers who have access to Manyame river who are utilising it for irrigation. The reason is not quite clearly maybe lack of capital or lack of interest thereof.

Chitomborwizi central is made up of farms which are between the east and west areas of Chitomborwizi. The area has a business centre known as Matoranjera to serve the whole farming region. The Makonde district council offices, a high school, a clinic and some few grocery shops are located at this township. This is the most developed area of Chitomborwizi with electricity available at a number of farms and at Matoranjera business centre.

Chitomborwizi west, it shares borders with Chitomborwizi central, Chirau and Makonde communal lands. The area covers Muchichiri, Rwenhombo and Mburungwe.

== Farming Activity ==
The main crop cultivated is maize (Zimbabwe's staple food), followed by cotton and recently tobacco has come onto the scene. The latter crop has proved to be popular mainly due to lucrative prices despite being labour-intensive. Chitomborwizi west farmers are known for their cotton farming prowess. Historically some of Chitomborwizi's best cattle was found in the western area. However farmers from this area have not benefited from the country's much talked about rural electrification programme. The majority of farmers are now farming on semi-subsistence level. There are a handful farmers who are utilising their farms commercially.

== Economic Meltdown effects ==
The downturn of Zimbabwe's economy which started in the late '90s to 2008(before the formation of the unity government between the MDC and ZANU–PF) did not spare Chitomborwizi as well. As the old adage goes "whenever elephants fight, it's the grass that suffers", the same happened to Chitomborwizi farmers. Most farmers were reduced to mere paupers during this period of economic meltdown when Zimbabwe had runaway inflation running into millions per year. Farmers' income was greatly eroded because of the nature of their income (once per season/year) this means most farmers would fail to plant crops the next season due to high input cost and run away inflation. To make matters worse the economically active young people from the farms left the area and migrated to neighbouring SADC countries and some to overseas countries like the UK, US, Canada etc. Thus the much needed labour was no longer available as most farmers rely on their families for labour (very few farmers have hired labour).

== The Missing Generation ==
The sad story of Chitomborwizi is that mostly farms are inherited from one generation to another. However most beneficiaries lack the skills and funds to become successful farmers. Some end up selling the farms or simply leave the farm lying idle. Then there was a knock on effect of the economic meltdown alluded earlier on; the next generation of beneficiaries (new owners) are no longer residing on farms. The few young people who did not migrate to other countries have gone to the city in search of better living conditions and a guaranteed monthly paycheck. This has turned most farms into a place where people come and meet during bereavements to bury their beloved ones. There is a real danger that next generation are not going to take farming as a serious business, some of the blame have to be shoved to government policies. There is little or no professional and financial support provided to farmers in Chitomborwizi. Problems affecting Chitomborwizi farmers are different from those of government's controversial land reform as the former have title deeds.

== Challenges ==
Most of the challenges facing Chitomborwizi have already been discussed. The roads in Chitomborwizi have not improved in the past decades or so but indeed the opposite has happened. The maintenance of is a responsibility shared between the government run DDF (District Development Fund under Ministry of Transport) and the rural district council. Both organisations are badly funded and managed. The latter relies on tax from farmers which is not enough and some farmers simply default on payment. Another element which is affecting Chitomborwizi is lack of funds. Farming is a business, time and again businesses need access to cheap/affordable capital to fund their business and this is not available to Chitomborwizi farmers. Farmers need to have boreholes so as to utilise their farms throughout the season and not rely on seasonal field crops only. Another problem facing farmers is skills shortage.
