= Francis Nhema =

Zimbabwean politician

The Right Honourable Francis Nhema MP

Minister of Youth Development, Indigenisation and Empowerment of Zimbabwe
- In office 11 September 2013 – 11 December 2014
- President: Robert Mugabe
- Preceded by: Savior Kasukuwere
- Succeeded by: Chris Mushohwe

Minister of Environment of Zimbabwe
- In office 13 February 2009 – 11 September 2013
- President: Robert Mugabe
- Prime Minister: Morgan Tsvangirai
- Preceded by: Walter Mzembi (Tourism)
- Succeeded by: Savior Kasukuwere

Minister of Environment and Tourism of Zimbabwe
- In office Unknown – 13 February 2009
- President: Robert Mugabe
- Preceded by: Unknown
- Succeeded by: Walter Mzembi (Tourism)

Personal details
- Born: 17 April 1959 (age 67)
- Party: ZANU–PF
- Education: Strathclyde University

Francis Nhema (born 17 April 1959) is a Zimbabwean politician, who served as Minister of Youth Development, Indigenisation and Empowerment from 2013 to 2014.

== History and biography ==
He previously was Minister of the Environment and Tourism. He is MP of the Shurugwi District. He was educated at Strathclyde University in Scotland.

He benefited from the seizure of land from white farmers, taking over a 10 km^{2} farm, Nyamanda, in the Karoi district about 200 km north of Harare, from farmer Chris Shepherd.

During his tenure as Minister for the Environment, national parks have suffered greatly from poaching.

He was elected on 11 May 2007 to head the United Nations Commission on Sustainable Development.

When the ZANU–PF–Movement for Democratic Change national unity government was sworn in on 13 February 2009, Nhema was included in the Cabinet as Minister of the Environment.

He was put on the United States sanctions list in 2003.
