= Muzenda =

Muzenda is a surname. Notable people with the surname include:

- Simon Muzenda, Zimbabwean politician
- Tsitsi Muzenda, Zimbabwean politician
