= ZANU–PF Youth League =

The ZANU–PF Youth League is the youth's wing of the Zimbabwe African National Union – Patriotic Front (ZANU–PF), the ruling political party of Zimbabwe. Membership includes Zimbabwean citizens between the ages of 15 and 35. The wing is led by Secretary Tinoda Machakaire, who also acts as Minister of Youth Empowerment, Development and Vocational Training. Historically, the Youth League has played a decisive role in national mobilization, election campaigns, and the enforcement of party policy across Zimbabwe's ten provinces.

== Overview ==
The youth wing was established in 1963 to mobilize young people against colonial rule during the Rhodesian Bush War. Following the Unity Accord, it merged with the PF-ZAPU youth structure to form the contemporary youth league. The National Youth Executive is the highest decision-making body of the league. The league is headed by the Secretary for Youth Affairs, who represents the league's interests directly within the party politburo. It also has provincial chairpersons coordinate regional structures to ensure localized mobilization.

== See also ==
- Politics of Zimbabwe
- African National Congress Youth League
