= 1985 Italy rugby union tour of Zimbabwe =

Summary
P	W	D	L
Total
6	5	0	1
Test match
2	2	0	0
Opponent
P	W	D	L
Zimbabwe
2	2	0	0

The 1985 Italy rugby union tour of Zimbabwe was a series of matches played between June and July 1985 and in Zimbabwe by the Italy national rugby union team. They played two matches against the Zimbabwe national rugby union team as well as some matches against provincial teams from Zimbabwe.

== Results ==
Scores and results list Italy's points tally first.

Opposing Team	For	Against	Date	Venue	Status
Mashonaland	13	24	16 June 1985	Harare	Tour match
Matabeland	38	12	19 June 1985	Bulawayo	Tour match
Zimbabwe	25	6	22 June 1985	Bulawayo	Test match
Midlands	31	26	26 June 1985	Gweru	Tour match
Zimbabwe	12	10	30 June 1985	Harare	Test match
Mashonaland	20	9	2 July 1985	Banket	Tour match
