= Keith Guzah =

Zimbabwean politician (died 2020)

Member of Parliament in National Assembly of Zimbabwe
- In office 2002–2014
- Constituency: Hurungwe West

Personal details
- Died: 14 July 2020
- Party: ZANU–PF
- Profession: Politician

Keith Guzah (died 14 July 2020) was a Zimbabwean politician who served as MP for Hurungwe West.

He was ZANU–PF chairman for Mashonaland West Province and a member of Generation 40.
