= Murombedzi =

Murombedzi Murombedzi Growth Point
- Location in Zimbabwe
- Coordinates: 17°42′00″S 30°12′00″E
- Country: Zimbabwe
- Province: Mashonaland West
- Districts of Zimbabwe: Zvimba District
- Municipality: Murombedzi Town Council
- Elevation: 4,900 ft (1,500 m)
- Time zone: UTC+2 (CAT)
- Climate: Cwa

Murombedzi is a town in Zimbabwe.

== Location ==
Murombedzi, also known as Murombedzi Growth Point, is a small town in Zvimba District, Mashonaland West Province, in central northern Zimbabwe. The town lies about 48 kilometres (30 mi), by road, south of the town of Chinhoyi, in neighbouring Makonde District. This location lies approximately 54 kilometres (34 mi), by road, north of the town of Chegutu. Murombedzi is located about 110 kilometres (68 mi), by road, west of Harare, the capital of Zimbabwe and largest city in that country. The coordinates of the town are: 17° 42' 0.00"S, 30° 12' 0.00"E (Latitude:17.7000; Longitude:30.2000).

== Overview ==
In addition to the Murombedzi Town Council offices, the town is the location of the district headquarters of Zvimba District. The areas within the district include Murombedzi, the district capital, and Chirau (the former Tribal Trust Lands) along with Muengezi and Chitomborwizi. Banket, another small town, lies about 25 kilometres (16 mi), southeast of Chinhoyi on the road to Harare.

Farming of both crops and animals, is the main economic activity in the areas surrounding the town. Murombedzi is the location of a grain depot belonging to the Grain Marketing Board, a branch of ZB Bank Limited, a branch of Zimbabwe Postbank (POSB), a post office and Gangarahwe Hospital. All the three major cellphone operators namely Telecel, Econet and NetOne have base stations in the town. Transport is solely by road, and there is a good road network linking Muronbedzi to the surrounding major towns. It is linked to Harare via Norton with a tarred road and to the south and north by the Chinhoyi-Chegutu Highway. Murombedzi also have government offices housing namely;the ministry of education, youth and development, agriculture, local government etc.

== History ==
The pioneers of Murombedzi Growth Point are the late Philip Edmund Chidarikire the owner of Chipata Trading Company (Private) Limited, the late "'John Masango'" of "Masango Stores", the late Mr.Peter Mutongerwa of Mutongerwa Hotel ,the late Mr. Paraffin of Paraffin Butchery & Bottle Store

== Population ==
The current population of Murombedzi is not publicly known. The next national population census in Zimbabwe is scheduled from 18 through 28 August 2012.

== See also ==
- Harare
- Chinhoyi
- Chegutu
- Provinces of Zimbabwe
- Districts of Zimbabwe
