= Mazvikadei Dam =

Dam in Zimbabwe

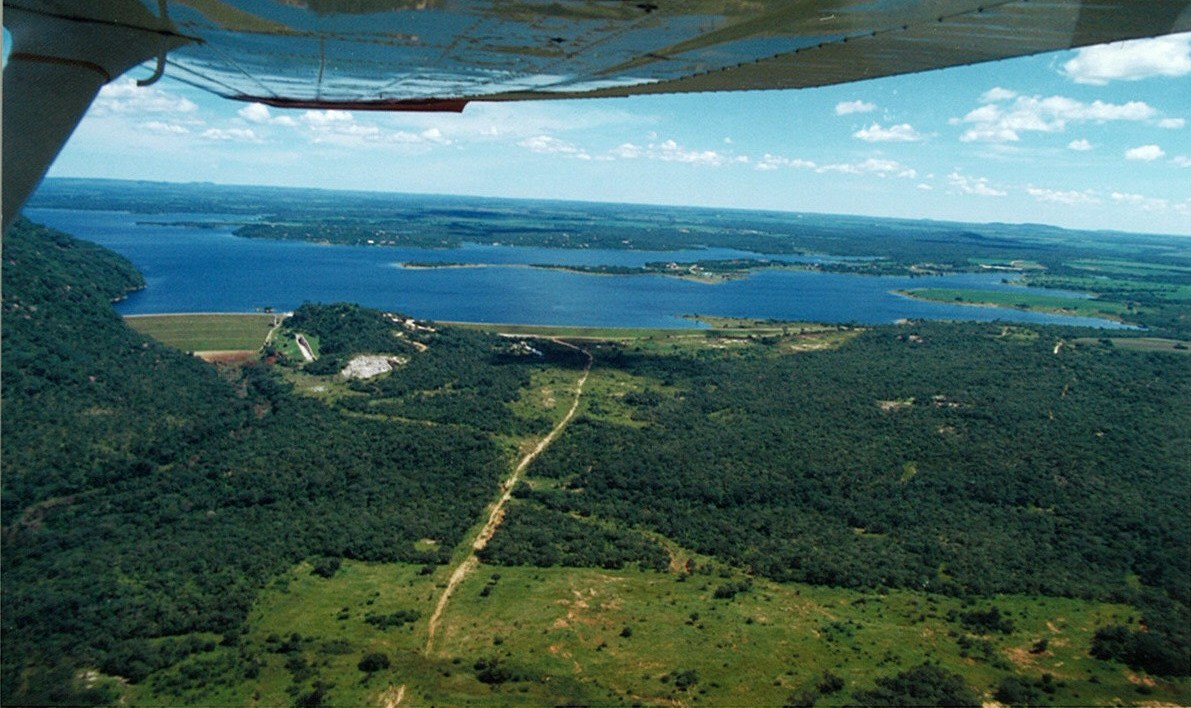
- Mazvikadei Dam (left)
- Official name: Mazvikadei Dam
- Location: Banket
- Coordinates: 17°13′14″S 30°23′30″E
- Construction began: 1985
- Opening date: 1988

Dam and spillways
- Impounds: Mukwadzi River
- Height: 63.5 metres
- Length: Main Dam 320 metres

Reservoir
- Total capacity: 360 million cubic metres
- Catchment area: 1120 square kilometres
- Surface area: 2300 hectares

Mazvikadei Dam is a dam in Zimbabwe which provides water for farm irrigation. It is the third largest dam in Zimbabwe.

Construction of the dam started in 1985, the main contractor being CMC di Ravenna with local subcontractors K.W.Blasting doing tunneling and hard excavation. The wall, which is an earthfill embankment, is 63.5 metres in height making it the second highest dam wall entirely within Zimbabwe. The construction was completed in 1988 and the reservoir filled for the first time in 1990. Built on the Mukwadzi River north of Banket it has a storage capacity of 360 million cubic metres with a surface area of 2 300 hectares when full. The long term yield for irrigation purposes is estimated to be 100 million cubic metres per annum or 10 cubic metres per second for an irrigation season of 4 months. The primary irrigated crop when the farms were functioning was winter wheat, however small quantities were used to supplement rainfall on summer crops such as maize and tobacco.

== Image gallery ==
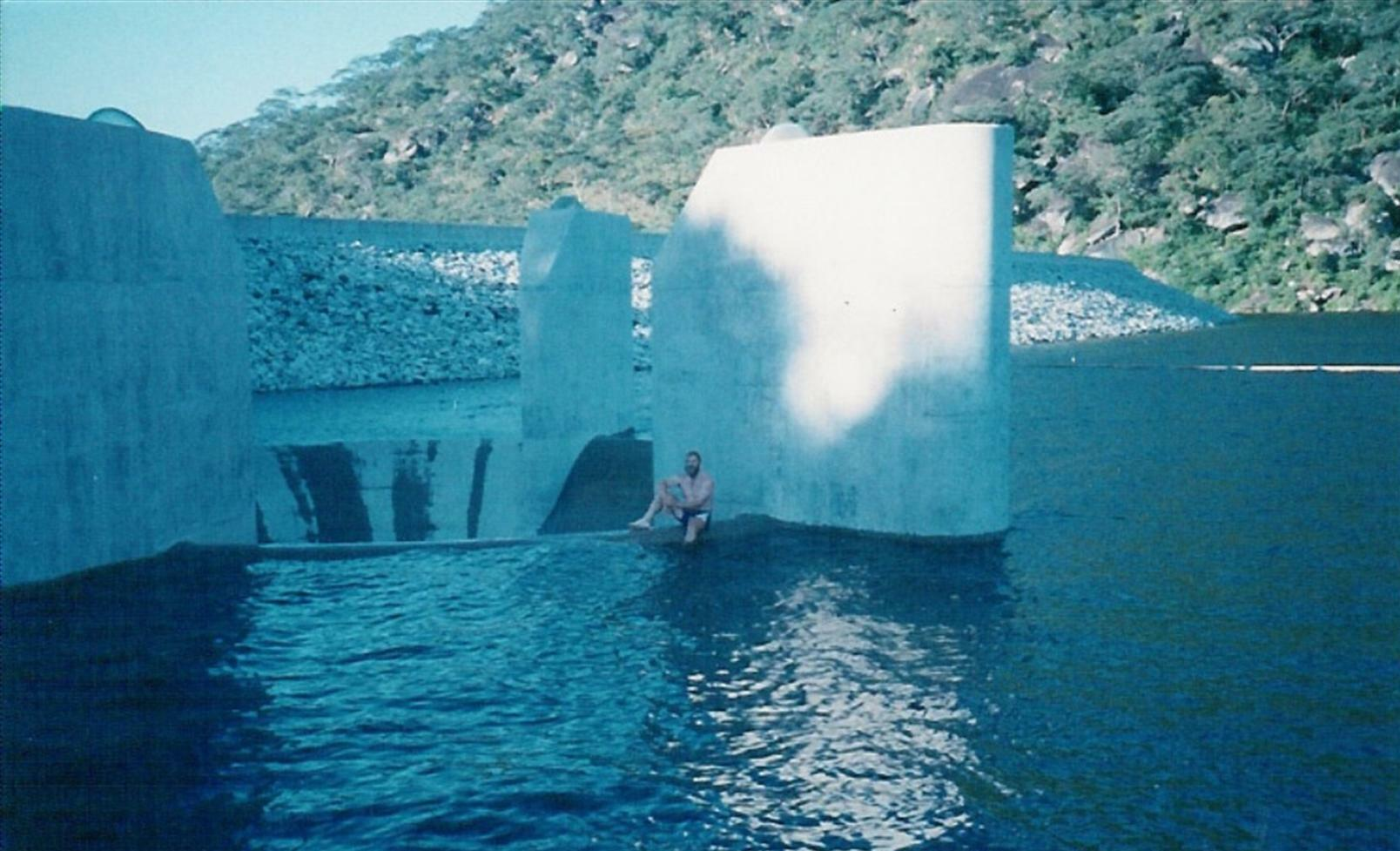
First spilling.

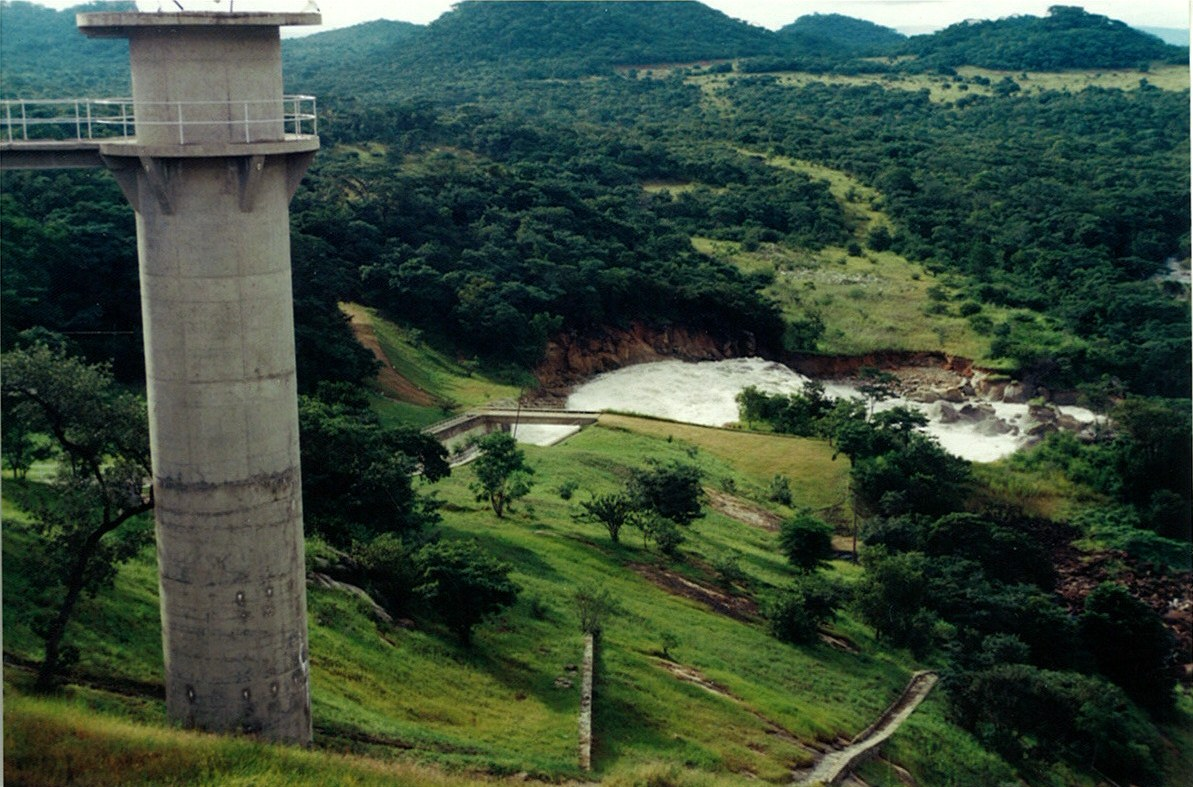
View downstream from crest
