= Likuyani Constituency =

Electoral constituency of Kenya

Likuyani
- constituency for the Parliament of Kenya
- Likuyani Constituency within Kakamega County

- Kakamega County within Kenya
- County: Kakamega
- Population: 152,055
- Area: 316 km^{2} (122.0 sq mi)

Current constituency
- Number of members: 1
- Party: ODM
- Member of Parliament: Innocent Mugabe
- Wards: 5

Likuyani is a constituency in Kenya. It is one of twelve constituencies in Kakamega County. It is also a subcounty in the Kakamega County, having been split from Lugari subcounty and bordering Trans Nzoia County to the west.

== Members of Parliament ==
- Innocent Mugabe

Innocent Mugabe Maino is a Kenyan politician who serves as the Member of Parliament (MP) for Likuyani Constituency in Kakamega County. He was elected in the 2022 general election on an Orange Democratic Movement (ODM) ticket.Political careerMugabe, a former chief officer in the Mombasa County government, received a direct nomination from the ODM party to contest the Likuyani parliamentary seat in 2022. Prior to this, he had been selected as the running mate for the ODM gubernatorial candidate in Kakamega County but stepped down in favor of Ayub Savula.As MP, Mugabe has initiated various constituency programs, including collaborations on education and teacher sensitization events. He has also participated in ODM party activities, such as regional conventions.EducationMugabe attended Bondeni Primary School, where he completed his Kenya Certificate of Primary Education (KCPE). He then attended Eshikulu Secondary School, obtaining his Kenya Certificate of Secondary Education (KCSE). He later pursued a Bachelor of Tourism degree at Moi University.CareerMugabe began his professional career in 2007 as a sales team leader at Kenya Commercial Bank, a position he held until 2009. He subsequently joined the Technical University of Mombasa as a lecturer and head of department. He later served as a chief officer in the Mombasa County government before entering politics.
