= Kudakwashe Mupamhanga =

Zimbabwean politician

The Hon. Kudakwashe Mupamhanga MP

Deputy Minister of Youth Empowerment, Development and Vocational Training
- Incumbent
- Assumed office 14 September 2023
- President: Emmerson Mnangagwa
- Minister: Tinoda Machakaire
- Preceded by: Tinoda Machakaire

Member of Parliament for Mount Darwin South
- Incumbent
- Assumed office 4 September 2023
- President: Emmerson Mnangagwa
- Preceded by: Stephen Kabozo
- Constituency: Mount Darwin South
- Majority: 15,391 (58.7%)

Personal details
- Party: ZANU-PF
- Parent: Justin Mupamhanga (father)
- Education: Kingston University

Kudakwashe Mupamhanga is a Zimbabwean politician. He is the current Deputy Minister of Youth Empowerment of Zimbabwe and a member of parliament. He is a member of ZANU–PF.
