= Trelawney, Zimbabwe =

Coordinates: 17°32′S 30°27′E

Trelawney is a small estate in the province of Mashonaland West, Zimbabwe with a lot of farms and farming activities It is located about 14 km south-west of Banket on the Harare-Chinhoyi railway line. Tobacco is grown in the region and there is a tobacco research station in Trelawney. Roses are also grown in the region, although the industry is not as impactful as that of tobacco.
