= Tsitsi Muzenda =

Senator of Midlands Province, Zimbabwe

Senator of Midlands Province
- Incumbent
- Assumed office 31 July 2018
- President: Emmerson Mnangagwa
- Minister: Lawrence David Mavhima

Deputy Minister of Energy and Power Development
- In office 14 December 2014 – 31 August 2018
- President: Robert Mugabe
- Minister: Joram Gumbo
- Succeeded by: Magna Mudyiwa

Chief Whip, Senate of Zimbabwe
- In office 3 October 2018 – Incumbent

Member of Politburo of ZANU-PF
- In office 11 June 1999 – Incumbent
- President: Robert Mugabe, Emmerson Mnangagwa

Personal details
- Born: Tsitsi Veronica Muzenda; 17 October 1951 (age 74) Bulawayo, Southern Rhodesia
- Party: ZANU-PF
- Relations: Tongai Muzenda (brother); Vitalis Muzenda (brother); Chikwereti Muzenda (brother); Ignatius Dewa Muzenda (brother); Virginia Muzenda (sister); Tendai Muzenda-Ngcobo (sister)
- Children: Tambu Glenda Muzenda
- Parents: Simon Muzenda; Maud Muzenda
- Education: Africa University (MPhil)
- Occupation: Politician

Tsitsi Veronica Muzenda (born 17 October 1950) is a Zimbabwean politician, senator of Midlands Province and daughter of the former Vice-President of Zimbabwe, Simon Muzenda.

== Early life and Armed Struggle ==
Tsitsi, was born in Bulawayo, Zimbabwe to politician, Simon Muzenda and Maud Muzenda. Together with her two siblings, Vitalis Muzenda and Virginia Muzenda, Tsitsi joined her father in the Rhodesian Bush War, the war that led to the end of colonialism in Zimbabwe.

== Senator of Midlands province (2018- current) ==
As senator of Midlands Province, Tsitsi was appointed by the Parliament of Zimbabwe to the Standing Rules and Orders Committee (SROC) in October 2018.

=== 2022 Russian Invasion of Ukraine ===
Speaking at the 144th Assembly of the Inter-Parliamentary Union in Bali, Tsitsi maintained a neutral position on the 2022 Russian invasion of Ukraine. She called for an earnest and constructive dialogue as the best solution to end the war in Ukraine. She called for the United Nations and the United Nations Security Council to work with both parties to resolve ending the war. Her views aligned with that of the government of Zimbabwe, which abstained from the UN vote to condemn Russia's invasion of Ukraine.

=== Education ===
In August 2021, when a thematic committee of Sustainable Development Goals led by Tsitsi Muzenda investigated the impact of the COVID-19 pandemic on education development in Zimbabwe, she recommended improving equality between rural and urban schools. She called the senate to attend the increasing cases of child pregnancy and school dropping outs among students in Zimbabwe.

== Deputy minister of energy ==
Tsitsi was appointed deputy minister of energy and power development in December 2014 by president Robert Mugabe. During her term as deputy minister, Tsitsi spearheaded the Sustainable Energy for All Initiative which sought to promote access to electricity to majority of people in Zimbabwe under the rural electrification programme.

== ZANU-PF politburo member ==
Tsitsi was appointed as a member of the Politburo of ZANU–PF in 1999, a move that political commentators saw as an effort by Robert Mugabe to strengthen loyalty to him in the party by appointing daughter his trusted lieutenant, Simon Muzenda. In 2020, following the suspension and expulsion of youth leaders of ZANU–PF, Pupurai Togarepi and Lewis Matutu after they disclosed corruption of President Emmerson Mnangagwa's close associate Kuda Tagwirei, Tsitsi Muzenda criticized the decision. She accused the decision of stifling debate in the party and portraying ZANU–PF as against the anticorruption fight.

== Sanctions and International Relations ==
Tsitsi has been on the sanctions list of both the European Union and the US Government implemented under the Zimbabwe Democracy and Economic Recovery Act of 2001 targeting persons who undermine Zimbabwe's democracy and institutions. The EU listed Tsitsi on the sanctions list in July 2002 along other ZANU–PF senior members and ministers. In a US Government executive order dated 10 March 2003 issued by George W. Bush, Tsitsi was put on the sanctions list as one of the persons undermining democratic processes or institutions in Zimbabwe. She was sanctioned in her capacity as a senior committee member of the Politburo of ZANU–PF. She has remained on the sanctions list of both the European Union and the US Government since then.

== See also ==
- Simon Muzenda
