= Banket, Zimbabwe =

Banket
- Small village
- Location within Zimbabwe
- Coordinates: 17°23′S 30°24′E
- Country: Zimbabwe
- Province: Mashonaland West
- District: Zvimba District
- Elevation: 1,274 m (4,180 ft)

Population (1982)
  - Total: 5,698
- estimated
- Time zone: UTC+2 (CAT)

Banket (originally known as Banket Junction) is a town in the province of Mashonaland West, Zimbabwe. It is located about 95 km north-west of Harare on the main Harare-Chinhoyi road. According to the 1982 Population Census, the town had a population of 5,698. The name of the town is derived from banket rock formation: early settlers saw a conglomerate, which they hoped would bear gold, like the banket of the Witwatersrand gold fields. The conglomerate was not gold-bearing, although gold was late discovered and, along with chromite, is still mined in the area. Cattle, maize, cotton and tobacco are commercially farmed in the area.

Banket grew as a service centre for the surrounding mines and commercial farms, and has suffered from the downscaling of chromite mining in Zimbabwe. The town further suffered from the expropriation of white-owned commercial farms in the controversial land reform programme that began in 2000. The town's main source of income and business clientele, the farmers and businesspeople, all but disappeared from the scene, leading to a loss of business and income. The settlers who took over the farms failed to fill the gap created by the demise of commercial farms. This led to the collapse of retail businesses and the few industries that were in the town.

The town has three primary schools (Kuwadzana, St Georges and Banket Primary) and two secondary schools (Kuwadzana High School and the Catholic-church-owned Sacred Heart Secondary School). It has a district hospital and a council clinic. The town grew primarily because of its role as a service centre for surrounding commercial farms and mining settlements. Mazvikadei Dam is also located north of Banket.

== Government and politics ==
Before the 1992 amalgamation of the rural councils, which managed mainly commercial farm land, and district councils, which managed mainly land held under traditional tenure, Banket-Trelawney Rural Council (BTRC) ran the small town. Services were good and infrastructure was solid. But there was a discrepancy in the level and quality of services between the white commercial farms and mainly white low density suburbs and the black high-density, low-income residential township of Kuwadzana. The amalgamation resulted in the creation of the Zvimba Rural District Council (ZRDC), with the head office being located at Murombedzi growth point. Crispen Kadhoza (ZANU-PF) served as councillor for Banket in ZRDC until losing ZANU-PF primary elections in 2008, and could therefore not represent the party in the electoral contest of 29 March, which was won by the MDC's Fanuel Tembo and Emmanuel Chinanzvavana who became the councillors for the two wards.

In 2008 Banket gained international fame following a series of politically motivated abductions of supporters of the opposition party. These included the councillors Fanuel Tembo, Emmanuel Chinanzvavana, his wife Concillia Chinanzvavana and an infant who was abducted with the mother. The abductees were later found in police custody after weeks of police denying knowledge of their whereabouts.

In 2007 the local government minister announced plans to turn the administration of Banket over to a town management board, which would put Banket in the same class as such urban centres as Ruwa, Chirundu and Hwange.

== Sport ==
Banket used to boast a soccer team known as Banket United, or simply B.U. and more recently Dzinza. The team reached as high as Soccer Division One but never made it to the Premier Soccer League.
