= Jason Zhuwao =

Zimbabwean politician

- Born: March 25, 1993 (age 33); Harare, Zimbabwe
- Occupation: Politician
- Spouse: Lorraine Zhuwao
- Children: 2

Jason Zhuwao (/zuːˈwaɪoʊ/) is a Zimbabwean politician. He is a former ZANU–PF Director for Youth Affairs and son of former Minister of Youth Indigenisation and Economic Empowerment Patrick Zhuwao and nephew to former Zimbabwe President Robert Mugabe. Zhuwao served under his father's ministry youth advisory board and held different government and ZANU PF portfolios.

== Background and early life ==
Jason Zhuwao is son to former minister Patrick Zhuwao whom is son to Sabina Mugabe, Robert Mugabe's late sister. Zhuwao attended Admiral Tait primary school and completed his secondary years at Prince Edward School. He studied for a higher diploma in Diplomacy and International Relations with the Zimbabwe Institute of Diplomacy. He is currently studying for a law degree with the University of South Africa. Zhuwao grew up in their family home in Eastlea and was raised by his parents and grandmother whom introduced him to active politics at age 15. Zhuwao would attend rallies and get involved in empowerment initiatives for the rural communities commissioned by his grandmother whom was a Member of Parliament.

== Political career ==
Jason Zhuwao started his political career at the age 15 when he joined active politics campaigning for his grandmother Sabina Mugabe who was Member of Parliament in the Zvimba South Constituency. He was mentored by his uncle Robert Mugabe as he rose through the party ranks to become chairperson of the ZANU PF Harare Central District, a position he utilized to gunner support for the then member of parliament Rickson Musarurwa whom he campaigned for in the elections but lost to MDC-T Murisi Zvivawi.

In 2014 he was hired as chief campaign strategist by then ZANU PF deputy director of information psychology Maziwisa who won the parliamentary by election. The same year Zhuwao was the face of the Million Man March in solidarity with former president Mugabe, an event that was covered on local and international media news including BBC World explaining the ZANU PF Youth League resolutions to endorse Mugabe for the 2018 elections.

Serving as administrator in the president's office in 2012 under the leadership of former Presidential Affairs Minister Didymus Mutasa, Zhuwao administered over the Sanctions Desk and the same year penned a series of articles defending ZANU PF government and its policies.

In 2015 Zhuwao was appointed ZANU PF Director for Youth Affairs and used his portfolio to support the motion to keep his uncle in power.

Zhuwao was coopted as ZANU PF Harare Provincial Youth League executive member from February 2017 to November the same year when the entire ZANU PF structures were dissolved following the military action that endorsed Emerson Mnangagwa as president.

== Leadership positions held ==
- Administrator (Sanctions Desk) president's office 2012
- ZANU PF Harare Central Chairman 2008
- ZANU PF Director for Youth Affairs 2016
- ZANU PF Information Officer
- Youth advisory board member (Ministry of Youth and Economic Empowerment) 2017
- ZANU PF Harare provincial member 2017
- CEO Robert Mugabe Institute

== Controversies ==
Zhuwao sparked controversy when he wrote an article in defence of Mugabe's company that was accused of poisoning then vice president Emerson Mnangagwa whom had claimed to have eaten Gushingo Dairy ice cream product that almost cost his life.

== Personal life ==
Jason Zhuwao has two children and was married to Lorraine Mugariri Zhuwao.
