= Sabina Mugabe =

Zimbabwean politician

The Honourable Sabina Mugabe MP

Member of the House of Assembly of Zimbabwe for Zvimba South
- In office 1985–2008

Personal details
- Born: 14 October 1934 Zvimba District, Southern Rhodesia
- Died: 29 July 2010 (aged 75) Harare, Zimbabwe
- Party: ZANU-PF
- Children: Innocent Mugabe; Leo Mugabe; Kevin Mugabe; Patrick Zhuwao; Robert Zhuwao

Sabina Gabriel Mugabe (14 October 1934 – 29 July 2010) was a Zimbabwean politician. She was the younger sister of the former Zimbabwean president Robert Mugabe.

== Biography ==
Sabina Mugabe was born on 14 October 1934 at the Kutama Roman Catholic Mission, which was run by Jesuits of the Rome-based Marist Order, in the Zvimba District 50 miles northwest of Harare, to a Malawian-born father, Gabriel Matibili and a Shona mother, Bona.

Sabina Mugabe left Rhodesia under an assumed name in 1975 and studied home economics and nutrition at Battersea College of Technology and Richmond College in London before going to Nova Scotia, Canada, to study for a diploma in social development at a Catholic college. Prior to leaving Rhodesia she had been sheltered by the Silveira House Catholic seminary, on the outskirts of Harare, while her brother Robert was leading ZANU guerrillas fighting former Rhodesian leader Ian Smith's forces from bases in Mozambique.

She served as the Zanu-PF Member of Parliament (MP) for Makonde East from 1985 to 1990 and for Zvimba South from 1990 to 2008. She was implicated in the violent confiscation of farms owned by white Zimbabweans in the late 1990s and the early 2000s. This included a link to the murder of a white Zimbabwean farmer by a mob she unleashed when she wanted his house for herself. Terry Ford, 55, was beaten and then shot in the head on his farm to the west of Harare. Earlier, in November 2000 Sabina Mugabe had informed Mr Ford that she wanted his farmstead "so she could move in". That Mr Ford's old Jack Russell, Squeak, refused to leave his body added a poignancy to the story that saw the case make international headlines.

She was placed on the United States sanctions list in 2003 and remained on the list until her death.

Sabina Mugabe suffered a stroke in 2007 and retired as an MP in 2008. According to then President Mugabe, he visited her prior to her death and was told that one-third of her brain had been damaged by the stroke.

Sabina Mugabe died in Harare on 29 July 2010, aged 75, following a long illness.
