= Walter Mzembi =

Zimbabwean politician

The Right Honourable Walter Mzembi MP
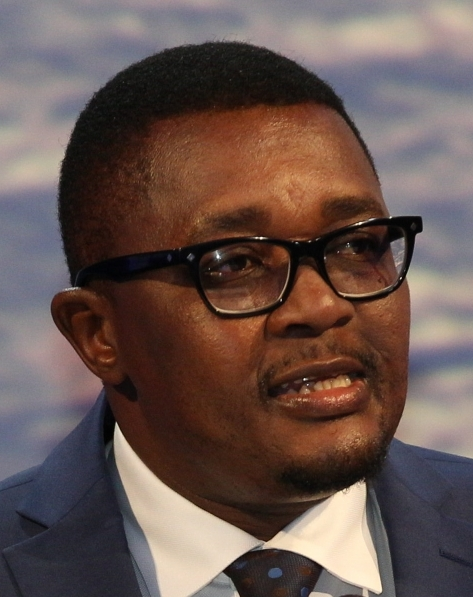
- Mzembi in 2016

Minister of Foreign Affairs
- In office 9 October 2017 – 27 November 2017
- President: Robert Mugabe; Emmerson Mnangagwa
- Preceded by: Simbarashe Mumbengegwi
- Succeeded by: Sibusiso Moyo

Minister for Tourism
- In office 13 February 2009 – 9 October 2017
- President: Robert Mugabe
- Preceded by: Office established
- Succeeded by: Edgar Mbwembwe

Personal details
- Born: 16 March 1964 (age 62) Masvingo Province, Zimbabwe
- Party: Zimbabwe African National Union-Patriotic Front
- Spouse: Barbra Hernandes Mzembi,
- Children: Gabriella Mzembi, Tanya Mzembi other 5
- Website: www.waltermzembi.org

Walter Mzembi (born 16 March 1964) is a Zimbabwean politician. He previously served as Minister of Foreign Affairs and Minister of Tourism and Hospitality Industry. He was the Member of the House of Assembly for Masvingo South (ZANU-PF). It was announced on November 27, 2017, that Simbarashe Mumbengegwi was now the acting Foreign Minister of Zimbabwe. In October 2020, it was revealed Mzembi was among those who fled to South Africa before their criminal trials could be completed.

== Early life ==
Mzembi was born to a Ndebele mother and a Karanga Shona father.

== Career ==
When the ZANU-PF–Movement for Democratic Change national unity government was sworn in on February 13, 2009, Mzembi became Minister of Tourism. Since 2007, he is placed on the European Union sanctions list.

He helped organize the UNWTO co-hosted by Zimbabwe and Zambia in August 2013. In 2017 Mzembi was the candidate of the African Union for the position of the 2018-21 Secretary-General of the World Tourism Organization.

On 19 November 2017, Mzembi was expelled from ZANU–PF by the party's central committee. Other prominent G40 politicians, including Grace Mugabe, Saviour Kasukuwere, Patrick Zhuwao, Ignatius Chombo, Jonathan Moyo, Shadreck Mashayamombe, Makhosini Hlongwane, Innocent Hamandishe, Samuel Undenge and Sarah Mahoka were also expelled from the party. His predecessor, Simbarashe Mumbengegwi, would also become acting Minister of Foreign Affairs on 27 November 2017 as well. He resurfaced at a scheduled parliamentary seating on the 28 November 2017 where he seemed jovial and loyal to the new leadership. He first went to greet First Lady Auxillia Mnangagwa followed by handshakes with several other MPs.

== Corruption case, departure from Zimbabwe and extradition request ==
Mzembi was arrested on 5 January 2018 and appeared in court on the next day where he was granted bail. The case has however dragged with his lawyers citing his ill health. He was however seen in a video circulating on social media appearing fit. He was arrested over allegedly misuse of resources meant for a tourism conference in 2013.

On October 12, 2020, it was revealed Mzembi fled to South Africa before his criminal trial could be completed and that Zimbabwe's national prosecutors met with South Africa Prosecutor-General Kumbirai Hodzi to seek extradition of both Mzembi and Saviour Kasukuwere on corruption charges. However, Hodzi hesitated and demanded that the proposed extraditions be based on the Extradition (Designated Countries) Order of 1990. Zimbabwe's prosecutor general stated that both Mzembi and Kasukuwere “had their cases before the courts, but they fled before their trials were completed.”

== See also ==
- ZANU-PF
- Robert Mugabe
- Emmerson Mnangagwa
- United Nations World Tourism Organization
