= Phillip Zhuwao =

Zimbabwean poet

Phillip Zhuwao (born 1971 - died 1997) was a Zimbabwean poet.

== Early life ==
Zhuwao grew up in an itinerant family, moving from farm to farm, as his parents were labourers. His grandfather was a Lozi from Barotseland, while his mother's people came from Mozambique. This contributed to his family's disorientation: "I have three international identities, an abnormality hard to describe." As he did not go far in his education, he was a self taught writer who read obsessively.

== Writing career ==
Though he lived a brief life, Zhuwao was a literary prodigy. He was widely published in South African literary magazines such as Bliksem, Contrast, New Coin, Staffrider, and struck up a friendship with publisher, Robert Berold, who has contributed immensely to his posthumous legacy. His only published book, Sunrise Poison, completed in 1996, was only released 21 years after his death. It is the first of a planned four volume collected works, which include fiction, essays, letters as well as poetry.

Zhuwao's work is also featured in Gary Cummiskey's Dye Hard Press. He wrote a series of chain poems with South African poet, Alan Finlay.

== Publications ==
Sunrise Poison (Deep South, 2018)

The Red Laughter of Guns in Green Summer Rain: Chainpoems with Alan Finlay (Dye Hard Press, 2002)
