= Tinoda Machakaire =

Zimbabwean politician

The Honourable Tinoda Machakaire MP

Minister of Youth Empowerment, Development and Vocational Training
- Incumbent
- Assumed office 12 September 2023
- President: Emmerson Mnangagwa
- Deputy: Kudakwashe Mupamhanga
- Preceded by: Kirsty Coventry

Member of Parliament for Wedza South
- Incumbent
- Assumed office 26 August 2018
- President: Emmerson Mnangagwa
- Preceded by: Michael Madanha
- Constituency: Wedza South
- Majority: 6,741 (36.7%)

Deputy Minister of Youth, Sport, Arts and Recreation
- In office 8 November 2019 – 22 August 2023
- President: Emmerson Mnangagwa
- Minister: Kirsty Coventry
- Preceded by: Yeukai Simbanegavi
- Succeeded by: Kudakwashe Mupamhanga

Personal details
- Born: 4 October 1981 (age 45) Bulawayo, Zimbabwe
- Party: ZANU-PF
- Education: University of South Africa

Tinoda Machakaire is a Zimbabwean politician. He is currently Minister of Youth Empowerment, Development and Vocational Training of Zimbabwe, after serving as deputy minister of Youth, Sports, Arts and Recreation. He is also a member of parliament. He is a member of ZANU–PF.
