= Stanlake J. W. T. Samkange =

Zimbabwean historiographer and educationist

Stanlake John William Thompson Samkange (1922–1988) was a Zimbabwean historiographer, educationist, journalist, author, and African nationalist. He was a member of an elite Zimbabwean nationalist political dynasty and the most prolific of the first generation of black Zimbabwean creative writers in English.

== Early life and education ==
Samkange was born in 1922 in Zvimba, Mashonaland, in British South Africa Company-administered Southern Rhodesia. He was the son of the Reverend Thompson Samkange, a Methodist minister and nationalist politician, and his wife, Grace Mano, a Methodist evangelist. The family lived in Bulawayo, Matabeleland and in Mashonaland during Samkange’s childhood. He took his higher education at Adams College in Natal, South Africa and the University of Fort Hare in Alice, South Africa, the first institution of higher learning in Africa that was open to black Africans.

He graduated with honours from Fort Hare in 1948 and returned to Southern Rhodesia to become a teacher. While pursuing his teaching career he began to make plans for Nyatsime College, a secondary school to be controlled by black officials rather than the government or missionaries. The school, which opened in 1962, provided academic, technical and commercial education for black Africans. He was deeply involved in the liberal politics of Southern Rhodesia during the 1950s and 1960s, but became disillusioned when he came to the conclusion that the white minority in Rhodesia would never accept any multiracial options for the country's government.

Samkange moved to the United States where he took further education at the Indiana University at Bloomington. After earning his Ph.D. from that institution, he worked as a journalist and then opened a public relations firm. He also taught African history at various universities in the US, including Harvard University and in 1978 he was professor of African American studies at Northeastern University, Boston.

== Writing ==
During his time at Indiana he began writing historical novels. His book, On Trial for My Country outlined the white man’s conquest of Rhodesia, the struggles of the native people during the conquest, and the clash between Cecil Rhodes and Lobengula, the Matabele king.

== Return ==
Samkange returned to Rhodesia in 1978 and became involved in African nationalist politics, running unsuccessfully for political office on two occasions. He held high offices in Joshua Nkomo’s Zimbabwe African People's Union and Bishop Abel Muzorewa’s United African National Council. He retired from active politics before the talks that led to the Lancaster House Agreement in 1979, concentrating instead on his writing. With his wife, Tommie Anderson, he wrote Hunuism or Ubuntuism (1980), an attempt to systematize an African epistemology, and African Saga (1971), a popular history of Africa.

Samkange’s best-known work, On Trial for My Country (1966), is a tale told by an old man of the imagined twin trials of Cecil Rhodes and Lobengula, the Ndebele (or Matabele) ruler, who are each tried by their ancestors for their respective parts in obtaining and granting the various concessions that led to the occupation of Matabeleland, Mashonaland and their environs by Rhodes's British South Africa Company in the 1880s and 1890s. Rhodes must convince his ancestors that he has been just and honest in his dealings with the Ndebele king Lobengula and his people, while Lobengula is required to explain to the ancestral spirits just how he had lost the land to the white man. The novel was banned in Rhodesia.

Stanlake Samkange died March 6, 1988, in Zimbabwe.

== Works ==
- Nonfiction
  - Origins of Rhodesia – 1968
  - African Saga – 1970
  - Hunhuism or Ubuntuism –1980
  - What Rhodes Really Said About Africans –1982
- Historical novels
  - On Trial for My Country – 1966
  - The Mourned One – 1975 (Heinemann African Series, London)
  - Year of the Uprising – 1978
  - Among Them Yanks – 1985
  - On Trial for That UDI* – 1986

*UDI was Rhodesia’s Unilateral Declaration of Independence in 1965 (see Unilateral Declaration of Independence (Rhodesia)).
