= District Development Fund =

District Development Fund, DDF
- Type: Public utility
- Industry: Development
- Headquarters: Zimbabwe
- Services: Rural Development

The District Development Fund, or DDF, is a Zimbabwe government agency within the Ministry of Rural Resources and Water Development that is charged with the responsibility of providing and maintaining rural infrastructure within the Communal, Resettlement and Small Scale Commercial Farming areas of Zimbabwe. Its programmes are funded by the government, donors and the private sector.

== Location ==
District Development Fund has offices in every rural district of Zimbabwe and has provincial offices as well as head office in Harare.

== DDF Divisions ==
=== Water Division ===
Responsible for construction and maintenance of rural water and sanitation infrastructure; small dams, irrigation schemes, piped water, deep wells and boreholes.

=== Roads Division ===
Since 1980, the District Development Fund (DDF) has been responsible for establishing all-weather road access throughout the rural areas of Zimbabwe. DDF has implemented the planning, selection; construction and/or re-construction and the establishment of proper periodic and routine maintenance for an estimated 25,000 km of rural roads throughout Zimbabwe. These activities were carried out under a comprehensive Rural Road Programme which was co-funded by the Government of Zimbabwe and the Government of Germany through Kreditanstalt für Wiederaufbau.

One of the notable achievements of this Programme is the successful establishment of the “Routine Road Maintenance System” that was developed during the implementation of the construction programme, and has now established full road maintenance on an estimated 25,000 km of road. This system is fully funded by the Government of Zimbabwe.

=== Resettlement Division ===
Responsible for rural resettlement programs.

=== Finance and Administration ===
Handle the administration of DDF.

=== Mechanical Division ===
Responsible for the equipment of the organisation. It also runs rural tillage programs.
