= Ministry of Youth Empowerment, Development and Vocational Training =

Government ministry of Zimbabwe

Agency overview
- Preceding agencies: Ministry of Youth Development, Indigenisation and Economic Empowerment; Ministry of Women and Youth Affairs; Ministry of Youth, Sport, Arts and Recreation
- Jurisdiction: Government of Zimbabwe
- Headquarters: Old Parliament Building, Corner Kwame Nkrumah Ave and Third St, Harare; 17°49′41.4″S 31°03′08.0″E
- Minister responsible: Tinoda Machakaire, Minister of Youth Empowerment, Development and Vocational Training
- Deputy Minister responsible: Kudakwashe Mupamhanga, Deputy Minister of Youth Empowerment, Development and Vocational Training
- Agency executive: Solomon Mhlanga, Permanent Secretary
- Website: youth.gov.zw

The Ministry of Youth Empowerment, Development and Vocational Training is a government ministry, responsible for youth issues and economic empowerment in Zimbabwe. The incumbent minister is Tinoda Machakaire.

The Ministry has had various inceptions in recent years, the most recent being the Ministry of Youth, Sport, Arts and Recreation, led by Kirsty Coventry.

== List of ministers ==
Name	Term start	Term end	Party
Saviour Kasukuwere	13 February 2009	11 September 2013	ZANU–PF
Francis Nhema	11 September 2013	11 December 2014	ZANU–PF
Christopher Mushohwe	11 December 2014	11 September 2015	ZANU–PF
Patrick Zhuwao	11 September 2015	9 October 2017	ZANU–PF
Chiratidzo Mabuwa	9 October 2017	27 November 2017	ZANU–PF
Sithembiso Nyoni	30 November 2017		ZANU-PF
Gideon Bonde	14 February 2021		ZANU-PF
