= Augustine Chihuri =

Commissioner General of the Zimbabwean police

Commissioner-General of the Zimbabwe Republic Police
- In office September 1993 – December 2017; Acting from 18 December 1991
- President: Robert Mugabe; Emmerson Mnangagwa
- Preceded by: Henry Mukurazhizha
- Succeeded by: Godwin Matanga

Personal details
- Born: 10 March 1953 (age 73) Southern Rhodesia

Augustine Chihuri (born 10 March 1953) is the former commissioner-general of the Zimbabwe Republic Police, having led the country's police force from 1991 to December 2017. He was named to the position in an acting on 18 December 1991, following the resignation of Henry Mukurazhizha, and was appointed substantive commissioner-general in September 1993.

Chihuri was forced into hiding in 2018 after president Emmerson Mnangagwa took over. In May 2019 it was falsely reported that Chihuri was in Malawi helping the DPP government to rig elections. On 6 December 2017, a rogue police officer attempted to set fire to Chihuri's house during a shootout at the property as a result of the offending officer attempting to steal goods from the property. The fire was promptly put out by the fire brigade. Since 2003, Chihuri is on the European Union and United States sanctions lists.

== See also ==
- Joint Operations Command
