= Innocent Mugabe =

Kenyan politician

Member of the National Assembly
- Incumbent
- Assumed office 2022
- Constituency: Likuyani Constituency

Personal details
- Party: Orange Democratic Movement
- Education: Moi University

Innocent Mugabe Maino is a Kenyan politician from the Orange Democratic Movement. He represents Likuyani Constituency in the National Assembly of Kenya.

He was previously Mombasa county government chief officer.
