= Thompson Samkange =

Zimbabwean nationalist, clergy and political organizer

- Born: c. 1887; Zwimba Reserve, Southern Rhodesia
- Died: 1956; Southern Rhodesia
- Citizenship: Zimbabwean
- Occupations: Clergyman, nationalist, political leader
- Known for: Founding the African National Congress (Rhodesia), Bantu National Congress
- Spouse: Grace Mano
- Children: Stanlake Samkange

Thompson Douglas Samkange (c. 1887–1956) was a Zimbabwean nationalist, religious leader, and political organizer who played a significant role in the early African resistance to colonial rule in Southern Rhodesia (now Zimbabwe). He was a founding figure in several key African political movements, including the revival of the African National Congress in 1945, and is remembered for his contributions to indigenous leadership and education.

== Early life and education ==
Samkange was born around 1887 in the Zwimba Reserve, present-day Zvimba District, Zimbabwe. He belonged to the Ngonya clan, from which the chiefs of the Zwimba tribe were traditionally chosen.

His mother was a devout Methodist, and he was educated to Standard VII at Waddilove Institute, a prominent mission school. He later became an ordained minister in the Methodist Church, preaching across the country in places such as Wankie, Pakami, and Kwenda.

== Political activism ==
In 1945, Samkange revived the African National Congress (Rhodesia) in Southern Rhodesia and served as its president. He also helped establish the Bantu National Congress, aiming to unify African voices against colonial policies. His leadership extended to organizing the general strike of 1948, which marked a turning point in African labor resistance.

He was elected president of the African section of the Southern Rhodesian Missionary Conference but opposed its racial segregation, advocating for unity and equality within religious institutions.

== Personal life and legacy ==
Thompson Samkange married Grace Mano around 1917, and they had several children. Among them was Stanlake J. W. T. Samkange, a prominent historian, novelist, and philosopher known for articulating the concept of Ubuntu in Zimbabwean political thought and educational system.

Samkange died in 1956. His legacy is preserved in scholarly works such as Terence Ranger’s Are We Not Also Men?: The Samkange Family and African Politics in Zimbabwe, 1920–64, which explores the family's role in shaping Zimbabwe’s intellectual and political landscape.
