= Godwin Matanga =

Zimbabwean police commissioner

Commissioner-General of the Zimbabwe Republic Police
- In office 12 February 2018; Acting from 19 December 2017 – 31 December 2024
- President: Emmerson Mnangagwa
- Preceded by: Augustine Chihuri

Personal details
- Born: 5 February 1962 (age 64) Chipinge, Southern Rhodesia (now Zimbabwe)
- Spouse: Chamapiwa Matanga

Tandabantu Godwin Matanga (born 5 February 1962) is a Zimbabwean police officer who served as the Commissioner-General of the Zimbabwe Republic Police from 19 December 2017 to 31 December 2024. He took office after the removal of Augustine Chihuri following the November 2017 coup d'état, and was officially appointed as Commissioner-General on 12 February 2018 by President Emmerson Mnangagwa. He joined the police in 1982 and previously had been deputy commissioner-general since 1992. He was retired by Emerson Mnangagwa on 20 Dec 2024 with the retirement taking effect on end of day 31 December 2024. He will be 62.

A veteran of Zimbabwe's war of independence, Matanga is closely aligned with ZANU–PF and has been involved in internal party politics and anti-opposition political violence. He has been subject to American and British sanctions since 2005 and 2021, respectively.

== Police career ==
Matanga was born on 5 February 1962 in Chipinge, Manicaland Province, in what was then Southern Rhodesia. In 1978, the 16-year-old Matanga joined the liberation struggle, crossing the border into Mozambique to join the Zimbabwe African National Liberation Army. In 1979, he was deployed to Romania and Egypt for training. After the war, Matanga joined the Zimbabwe Republic Police as a patrol officer in October 1982. He subsequently rose through the ranks and was appointed deputy commissioner-general in 1992.

By the mid-2000s, Matanga became a member of the Joint Operations Command, Zimbabwe's top state security coordinating body. On 22 November 2005, Matanga was placed under United States Treasury Department sanctions, along with 127 other Zimbabweans accused of "hindering the democratic transition of Zimbabwe," by President George W. Bush, who described the 2005 Zimbabwean parliamentary election as "not free or fair." In 2011, it was reported that Matanga was vying against Innocent Matibiri, a nephew of President Robert Mugabe, for the position of commissioner-general amid rumors that Augustine Chihuri's term would not be renewed. Matanga is closely aligned with the ruling party, ZANU–PF, and has been involved in internal party politics and anti-opposition political violence. In 2012, he was present at a meeting of the ZANU–PF provincial coordinating committee for Manicaland ahead of the 2013 elections, along with other top army and police officials.

On 19 December 2017, Matanga was appointed acting commissioner-general of the Zimbabwe Republic Police. He replaced Augustine Chihuri, an ally of President Robert Mugabe, who was forced to retire after the president was ousted in the November 2017 coup d'état. According to Chihuri, Matanga helped set the coup in motion when he told the country's military commander, Constantino Chiwenga, that Chihuri was planning to arrest him. On 12 February 2018, Matanga was officially appointed commissioner-general by President Emmerson Mnangagwa. Matanga was involved in efforts to seize former commissioner-general Chihuri's assets, alleged obtained via corrupt means during his term as commissioner-general. Chihuri accused Matanga of sending police to set his home on fire and harass his family, and of being unqualified for the post of police chief.

On 1 February 2021, the United Kingdom imposed sanctions on Matanga, along with state security minister Owen Ncube, Central Intelligence Organisation director Isaac Moyo, and Presidential Guard commander Anselem Sanyatwe. The sanctions bar Matanga and the others from traveling to the UK or accessing the country's banks, and were the first sanctions put in place by Britain unilaterally since its departure from the European Union. The British Foreign Office said Matanga "bears responsibility for serious human rights violations committed by the police and military during the crackdown on post-election protests in August 2018, which resulted in six civilian deaths." In November 2021 and March 2022, Matanga was ordered to pay compensation to three victims of police brutality.

== Personal life ==
Matanga is married to Chamapiwa Matanga. He has at least two sons, who are involved in the ZANU–PF Youth League.
