= The Mail (Zimbabwe) =

Zimbabwean daily newspaper

The Mail is a private daily newspaper in Zimbabwe. The newspaper became Zimbabwe's first daily newspaper to be registered after the closure of the Daily News in 2003. The newspaper also has an online edition, and is affiliated to The BusinessWeekly, a private economics weekly title. Its offices are located at ZB Centre, Harare.
