= Temba Mliswa =

Zimbabwean politician and businessman (born 1971)

Temba Mliswa is a former Zimbabwean politician and businessman. He was the independent member of the National Assembly of Zimbabwe for Norton Constituency from 2016 until his defeat in the 2023 general election.

== Early background ==
Temba Mliswa was born in 1971 in Zambia. He grew up in Waterfalls suburb of Harare, Zimbabwe and attended his early education at Lord Malvern School in Harare and St Faith's Mission School in Rusape. Mliswa went on to attain a BA (Honours) Degree in Sports and Fitness Studies from Luton University(UK)

== Career ==
Temba Mliswa began his career in politics in 1996. He joined ZANU PF party and became a ZANU PF legislator serving as a Member of Parliament for Hurungwe West Constituency from 2013 to 2015. He was appointed ZANU-PF provincial chairman for Mashonaland West Province from 2013 to 2014 and member of the Central Committee.

In 2015 Mliswa was ousted from ZANU PF party, he then went on to establish an apolitical organisation called Youth Advocacy for Reform and Democracy in October 2015. As an independent candidate Temba Mliswa contested and won the by-election for Member of Parliament for Norton Constituency in 2016.

Temba Mliswa is an executive of Saltlakes Holdings which comprises Saltlakes Tobacco, Saltlakes Advisory, and Saltlakes Implements. He has agriculture investments through Spring Farm which is situated in Hurungwe. Mliswa also has investments as a shareholder in Meikles Limited and Kingdom Financial Holdings Limited which was renamed to Afrasia Bank Zimbabwe Limited in 2012. He was appointed to the Meikles board of directors in 2010.

== Involvement in sport ==
Temba Mliswa is a sports fitness and rugby coach. He started rugby coaching at Keio in August 1993 in the United States. He was then invited to England by Roger Uttley where he briefly coached Harrow, Eton and London Wasps Under-18s, Middlesex Division III club Feltham and English South West Division II team Marlow. Mliswa then returned to Zimbabwe in 1995 and Mliswa served as Zimbabwe national football team fitness coach and a member of the Zimbabwe Football Association's technical committee. After leaving national football team, he was hired as fitness coach for Caps United Football Club which went on to win the BP Cup during that season. He became Dynamos FC Chairman in 2002 before forming Pioneers of Black Cricket, an organisation that was to increase black representation in the national cricket team.

Mliswa was appointed Zambian Rugby national team coach and served as Zambia Rugby director, he also served as Rugby Director of coaching for Zimbabwe Rugby. 2013, he served as the chairperson of the Sport, Arts and Culture Parliamentary Portfolio Committee.

== Positions held ==
Temba Mliswa sits on various organisations boards, below are the most notable ones.

- Hurungwe West Development Association - Chairman 2013
- Norton Development Association - Chairman 2016
- Affirmative Action Group - former Vice President 2010
- Zimbabwe Economic Empowerment Council - immediate past president 2012
- Tobacco Association of Zimbabwe - former President and Trustee 2011
- Mines & Energy Parliamentary Portfolio Committee - Chairman 2016
- Mines and Mining Development in the Parliamentary Portfolio Committee - Chairman 2016
