= Politburo of ZANU–PF =

Zimbabwean political party body

The Politburo of ZANU-PF is a 49-member body which acts as the standing committee of the Central Committee of the Zimbabwe African National Union – Patriotic Front. It meets at least once a month and members are appointed by the party president. It is the party's highest decision making body outside of the party congress.

== Membership ==
The membership of the ZANU-PF Politburo as of 2023 is as follows:

- Party Chair Oppah Muchinguri, 14 Dec 1958
- Secretary for Administration Advocate Jacob Mudenda, 12 Oct 1951
- Deputy for Secretary for Administration Mike Nyambuya
- Secretary for Finance Patrick Chinamasa, 25 Jan Mariam Chikwinya security Zimbabwe 1947
- Deputy Secretary for Finance Mthuli Ncube
- Secretary for Commissariat Mike Bimha
- Deputy Secretary for Commissariat Webster Shamu, 06 Jun 1945
- Secretary for Foreign Relations Simbarashe Mumbengegwi
- Deputy Secretary of Foreign Relations Abednigo Ncube
- Secretary for Security Lovemore Matuke
- Deputy Secretary for Security Tendai Chirau
- Secretary for Transport and Social Welfare July Moyo
- Deputy Secretary for Transport and Social Welfare James Makamba
- Secretary Legal Affairs Ziyambi Ziyambi
- Deputy Secretary Legal Affairs Fortune Chasi
- Secretary for Information and Publicity Christopher Mutsvangwa
- Deputy Secretary for Information and Publicity Chido Sanyatwe
- Secretary for Health and Child Welfare and the Elderly Douglas Mombeshora
- Deputy Secretary for Health and Child Welfare and Elderly Irene Zindi
- Secretary for Lands and Agriculture Kenneth Musanhi
- Deputy Secretary for Lands and Agriculture Mike Madiro
- Secretary for Environment and Tourism Auxillia Mnangagwa
- Deputy Secretary for Environment and Tourism Joshua Sacco
- Secretary for Education, Ideology and Research Charles Tawengwa
- Deputy Secretary for Education, Ideology and Research Rebbeca Fanuel
- Secretary for Science and Technology Ziyambi Ziyambi
- Deputy Secretary for Science and Technology Nicholas Nkomo
- Secretary Economic Development and Empowerment Sithembiso Nyoni 20 Sep 1949
- Deputy Secretary Economic Development and Empowerment Otilia Maluleke
- Secretary for Labour Richard Ndlovu
- Deputy Secretary for Labour Jennifer Mhlanga
- Secretary for Mines and Energy Development Paul Mangwana
- Deputy Secretary for Mines and Energy Development Eliphas Tshuma
- Secretary for Local Government and Devolution Supa Mandiwanzira
- Deputy Secretary for Local Government and Devolution Monica Mavhunga
- Secretary for Economic Affairs Engelbrecht Rugeje
- Deputy Secretary for Economic Affairs Andy Mhlanga
- Secretary for People Living with Disabilities Joshua Malinga
- Deputy Secretary for People Living with Disabilities Elina Shirichena
- Secretary for Women Affairs Mable Chinomona
- Deputy Secretary for Women Affairs Judith Ncube
- Secretary for Youth Affairs Tino Machakaire
- Deputy Secretary for Youth Affairs John Paradza
- Secretary for War Veterans Affairs Douglas Mahiya
- Deputy Secretary for War Veterans Affairs Headman Moyo
- Secretary for Business Development Eliphas Mashava
- Deputy Secretary for Business Development Esther Nyati
- Tshinga Dube
- Frederick Shava
- Tsitsi Muzenda
- Molly Ncube
- Daniel Mackenzie Ncube
- Munyaradzi Machacha (ex-officio)
- Philip Valerio Sibanda
