= Zvimba District =

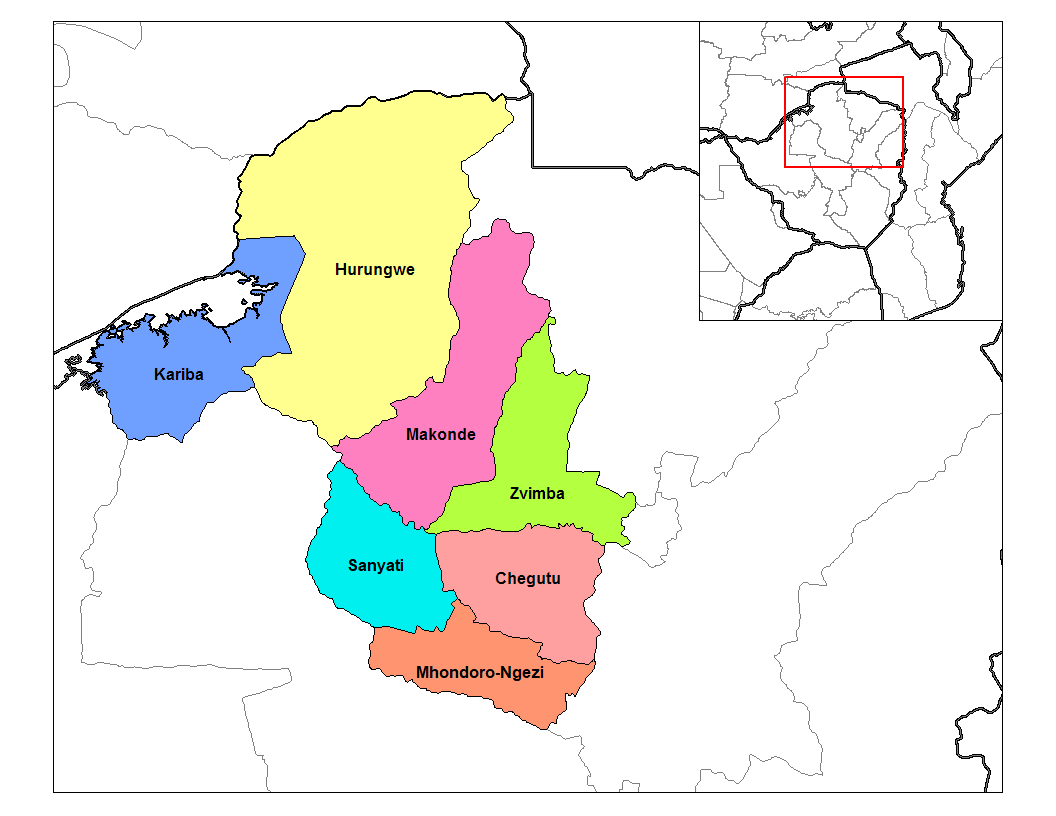
- Zvimba District (light green) in Mashonaland West Province
- Coordinates: 17°42′S 30°12′E
- Country: Zimbabwe
- Province: Mashonaland West

Area
  - Total: 6,072 km^{2} (2,344 sq mi)

Population (2022 census)
  - Total: 348,002
  - Density: 57.31/km^{2} (148.4/sq mi)

Zvimba District is a district of Mashonaland West Province, Zimbabwe.

== Location ==
The district is located in Mashonaland West Province, in central northern Zimbabwe. Zvimba District is bordered by Guruve District to the north, Mazowe District to the east, the city of Harare to the southeast, Chegutu District to the south, Kadoma District to the southwest and Makonde District to the west and northwest.

Its main town, Murombedzi, is located about 110 kilometres (68 mi) by road west of Harare, the capital and largest city of Zimbabwe. The district lies about 48 kilometres (30 mi) by road, south of the town of Chinhoyi, Makonde District, the nearest large town.

=== History of Chief Zvimba mtorashanga ===
The Zvimba chieftainship was founded by Neuteve Chihobvu who migrated from Guru Uswa. When he arrived in the area now known as Zvimba he complained that his feet were swollen, (Nda zvimba makumbo). He was thereafter called Zvimba. The land now called Zvimba then belonged to the Rozvi tribe then headed by Tambare. Tambare allocated the land to Neuteve (Zvimba). Neuteve became the first chief Zvimba.

== Overview ==
Zvimba District is primarily a farming and ranching district. Crops raised include tobacco, maize and cotton. Cattle are raised for dairy products and beef.

== Education ==
A fair number of primary and secondary schools are located in Zvimba District, the most well-known being a private, selective school called Cornway College in Mt. Hampden on the outskirts of Zvimba and in very close proximity to Harare. Kutama College previously known as (St Francis Xavier College) is an all-boys high school located near the town of Norton in the Zvimba area, 80 kilometres southwest of the Zimbabwean capital Harare.

== Population ==
The current population of Zvimba District is 263 020 according to the last census of 2012. Of this population 50. 2 per cent are male while females constitute the remaining 49.8 per cent. By population size, Zvimba Rural District is the second largest in Mashonaland West after Hurungwe and has 17.5 per cent of the total provincial population. The 2017 ZimStats population projections state that by 2020 Zvimba will have around 161 660 males and 155 931 females respectively.

== Notable people ==
- James Chikerema
- Sabina Mugabe
- Tobaiwa Mudede
- Faber Chidarikire
- Robert Gabriel Mugabe
- Thompson Samkange
- Stanlake J. W. T. Samkange
- August Msarurgwa

== See also ==
- Districts of Zimbabwe
- Provinces of Zimbabwe
