= Zimbabwe Republic Police =

Law enforcement agency

Zimbabwe Republic Police Amapholisa Mapurisa
- Abbreviation: ZRP
- Motto: Latin: Pro lege, pro patria, pro populo 'For Law, For Country, For People'

Agency overview
- Formed: 1 August 1980; 46 years ago
- Preceding agency: British South Africa Police

Jurisdictional structure
- National agency: Zimbabwe
- Operations jurisdiction: Zimbabwe
- General nature: Civilian police

Operational structure
- Sworn members: 45,000 (2018)
- Minister responsible: Kazembe Kazembe
- Agency executive: Stephen Mutamba, Commissioner-General
- Parent agency: Ministry of Home Affairs
- Departments: 12: Administration; Boat Squadron; Canine Section; Criminal Investigations; Internal Security and Investigation (PISI); Police Air Wing; Police Support Unit; Riot Squad; Signals Branch; Special Constabulary; Uniformed Branch; Women's Branch

Website
- www.zrp.gov.zw

The Zimbabwe Republic Police (ZRP) is the national police force of Zimbabwe, having succeeded the British South Africa Police (BSAP) on 1 August 1980.

== History ==
Emblem of the British South Africa Police

The British South Africa Police was formed in 1889 under the rule of the British South Africa Company. The Zimbabwe Republic Police was established on 1 August 1980 following the Rhodesian Bush War, by the integration of the BSAP, auxiliary forces, and ZIPRA and ZANLA forces. Then-Home Affairs Minister Cde Joshua Nkomo announced the new post-independence title for the national police.

Following independence in 1980, the force had a strength of about 9,000 regular personnel and a further 25,000 police reservists (nearly half of whom were white Zimbabweans of European ancestry). After independence, the force followed an official policy of "Africanisation", in which senior white officers were retired, and their positions filled by black officers. In 1982, Wiridzayi Nguruve, who had joined the force as a constable in 1960, became the first black commissioner of the force. He was then succeeded by Henry Mkurazhizha whose deputies were Augustine Chihuri and Emmanuel S. Ruzario, the former going on to become commissioner.

Zimbabwe Republic Police commander's rank was upgraded from Commissioner to Commissioner-General in 2008. This followed a similar move in the Zimbabwe Defence Forces in 1993 and consequently in the Zimbabwe Prisons and Correctional Service in 2014.

== Structure ==
The Zimbabwe Republic Police consists of at least 45 000 officers and members as at 1 May 2018, and is headquartered in Harare at the Police General Headquarters (PGHQ).

Overall, command of the force is exercised by the Commissioner-General Stephen Mutamba. He is deputised by four Deputy Commissioners-General that form part of the Central Planning Committee (CPC)- a decision passing body in the ZRP. The Deputy Commissioners-General are also deputised by Commissioners. This structure makes Commissioner-General the highest rank.

=== General organisation ===
The force has four divisions headed by Deputy Commissioners-General that consist of provinces which are normally headed by a Commissioner.

The provinces include Duty Uniform Branch (DUB), Support Unit, Canine Unit, Technicians, Depot Training wing, the Traffic branch and Administration Staff. The plain clothes units include the Criminal Investigation Department (CID), Border Control Unit, Police Internal Investigations, and Police Internal Security Intelligence (PISI).

=== Anti-Stock theft ===
The Anti-Stock Theft Unit was established in November 2004, after realising that there was a need to build the national herd in line with government's policy of reviving the national economy. Historically, livestock have been the source of an African man's pride. Cattle are a symbol of wealth; they provide draught power as well as generate the much needed foreign currency through beef exports.

==== Structure of Anti Stock Theft Unit ====
The unit is headed by a National Co-coordinator of Anti-Stock Theft based at Police General Headquarters. It has provincial and district teams that are headed by Provincial Anti-Stock Theft Coordinators and District Anti-Stock Theft Co-ordinators respectively who co-ordinate anti-stock theft activities in their respective areas. There are also station anti-stock theft teams at every station throughout the country who are responsible for investigating stock theft dockets at their respective stations.

=== Canine Unit ===
The ZRP Canine Section is responsible for breeding and training of police dogs. Over the years, police dogs have proved to be effective in crime prevention and investigation of crime scenes where they are mainly used for;

- Tracking
- Sniffing/Searching
- Crowd Control
- Preventive Patrols

The ZRP Canine section has made remarkable achievements in the fight against crime and has since been decentralized to strategic provincial/district headquarters.

=== Criminal Investigation Department ===
Crime Investigation Department (CID) is a branch of the Zimbabwe Republican Police responsible for the investigation and detection of serious crimes.

==== CID Scenes of Crime ====
CID Scenes of Crime section is responsible for evidence gathering by scientifically examining crime scenes, gathering fingerprint evidence and linking suspects to crimes that would have been committed.

==== CID Property ====
CID Property investigates and detects serious cases of unlawful entry, theft and vandalism of property particularly from public utilities.

==== Automated Fingerprints Identification System (AFIS) ====
This is a section responsible for electronic classification and vetting of fingerprints. The section also has an electronic database of all criminals that would have been fingerprinted. AFIS [Automated Fingerprint Identification System] was introduced by the Organisation for easy and quick fingerprint searching and vetting.

==== CID Drugs ====
This is a specialised section that deals with cases involving drug abuse and trafficking. Drug abuse impacts negatively on individuals, society and the economy. Maintaining a healthy workforce ensures productivity in the country.

==== CID Serious Frauds ====
CID Serious Frauds is a specialised section that deals with high-profile cases of theft where there is an element of misrepresentation. The section has a cyber crime team to deal specifically with the scourge of computer-generated crimes. The professional handling and reduction of fraud cases builds public and investor confidence thereby enhancing economic growth.

==== Vehicle Theft Squad ====
The Vehicle Theft Squad is a specialised section that deals with cases of theft and robbery of motor vehicles. The section is also responsible for the clearing of motor vehicles for various purposes that include:

- Clearance for registration of motor vehicles
- Clearance for permanent export where a SARPCCO clearance certificate is issued.
- Temporary Clearance where vehicle is to be used outside the country temporarily.
- Clearance for vehicles imported from outside the SARPCCO region for the purposes of re-registration.
- Clearance for a change of ownership.

==== CID Homicide ====
CID Homicide is a specialised section that deals with high-profile cases of robbery and murder where life is threatened or lost through the use of lethal weapons.

==== INTERPOL National Central Bureau (INTERPOL NCB) ====
The International Criminal Police Organization (ICPO) popularly referred to as INTERPOL is an international police organisation that deals with transnational crime. The organisation has a membership of 194 countries and Zimbabwe is a member. Each member country has a National Central Bureau (NCB) which deals with transnational crimes. The other roles of NCB include:

- Exchange of information with other NCBs on criminal matters
- Extradition of fugitives
- Development of national criminal database
- Sharing information/intelligence on policing matters

The NCB has the following desks

- Theft of motor vehicles
- Economic crimes
- Financial and high-tech crimes
- Public safety and terrorism
- Stock theft
- Drug trafficking
- Trafficking in human beings
- Fraudulent travel documents
- Environmental Crimes

==== Forensics & Ballistics ====
The Forensic Science Laboratory Unit is housed at the Criminal Investigation Department Headquarters in Harare. This is a highly specialised technical unit of the Zimbabwe Republic Police whose function is to aid police investigations through analysing exhibits and giving expert conclusive evidence on crime scenes.

The unit is staffed by highly qualified forensic scientists, and has the following sub-sections:

===== Biology Section =====
The Section analyses a wide range of biological evidence for example samples of blood, semen, saliva, sweat derived from cases of murder, rape, stock-theft, etc.

===== Criminalistics Section =====
The Criminalistics area brings together a pool of scientists dealing with microscopy, tool marks, paints, glass, fibres and hairs analyses etc. The section also examines evidence of hair, fibres, gunshot residue, bullets, cartridges and metals.

===== Chemistry Section =====
This section analyses minute to complex toxicological evidence (pesticides, insecticides, herbicides and other poisons), arson accelerants, explosives and explosive ordinances, blood alcohol, controlled drugs etc.

==== Document Examination Section ====
The Document Examination Section uses application of advanced analytical techniques in the analysis of hand-writing, signatures, indented impressions, alterations, erasures, obliterations, type writer, printed documents etc.

=== Cycle Patrol Unit ===
The Cycle Patrol Unit was introduced in the ZRP in August 2003 and is the brainchild of the Commissioner-General of Police, Comrade Doctor Augustine Chihuri. The main thrust behind the establishment of such a Unit was to reduce criminal activities in the cities and towns, streets, roads and avenues.

The Unit was commissioned by Cde. Dr. Chihuri at Morris Depot on the 14th of November 2003. The pioneer project commenced with 55 riders, five of whom were ladies and were deployed in Harare and Bulawayo.

Its duties include:

- Patrol cities and to attend scenes.
- Maintain police presence.
- Arrest any person found committing or reasonably suspected to have committed an offence.
- Record statements and taking particulars of witnesses, the injured or deceased before handing over the case to the station whose area is being patrolled.
- Control road traffic and arrest traffic offenders.
- Taking all steps which on reasonable grounds appear to be necessary for preserving the peace.
- Prevent and detect crime.
- Building and maintaining public relations.
- Protect property from malicious injury.
- Stop and search any person suspected to be carrying stolen property and the seizure thereof.
- Enforce City By-Laws.
- Check houses under police supervision.

==== Training ====
The joining of the Police Cycle Unit is on a voluntary basis.

Recruits undergoing initial police training are co-opted for Training and after pass-out are deployed to undertake Cycle Patrol Unit duties.

The ZRP is now a member of Zimbabwe Triathlon Association and Zimbabwe Cycling Association. These association give expert advise in terms of training, dress order and acquisition of appropriate cycles.

=== Mounted Unit ===
The Zimbabwe Republic Police Mounted Unit plays a critical role by conducting crime prevention patrols especially in remote and rough terrains where motor vehicles cannot maneouver their way. In urban centres, horses are also used in crowd control situations and ceremonial duties. Horses provide that added advantage of height and visibility to allow police riders to observe a wider area and this helps to deter crime.

Roles of Mounted Unit

- Mounted Patrols in crime prone areas.
- Mounted escorts during state occasions e.g. Opening of Parliament
- Entertainment displays during Commissioner General of Police's Funfair, Zimbabwe International Trade Fair, Agricultural Shows
- Public order management e.g. sports activities.
- Suppress all forms of social disorder and commotion and maintain public confidence.

=== Police Protection Unit ===
The Police Protection Unit is responsible for providing security to the VIPs within the country such as Head of State, Vice Presidents, Ministers, Ambassadors, Judges and any other designated persons. They also protect key installations such as State House, Parliament Building etc

=== Sub Aqua Unit ===
The Sub-Aqua is a specialized police unit responsible for policing water bodies. The Unit aids crime investigations by retrieving bodies in cases of drowning and recovering exhibits concealed in water bodies. The Sub-Aqua Unit is located in two Support Unit districts, namely Chikurubi Depot in Harare and Fairbridge District in Bulawayo

=== Support Unit ===
The Support Unit is a branch within the Zimbabwe Republic Police. Its headquarters are in Chikurubi, Harare. It is commanded by an Officer of the rank of Commissioner, who is responsible for the day-to-day administrative and the operational efficiency of the Unit.

The Support Unit has four Districts: Chikurubi Urban; Chikurubi Rural; Fairbridge (Bulawayo); Buchwa (Zvishavane) and Changadzi.

=== Tourism Unit ===
Tourism Police Unit was established in 2004 as a community policing initiative to proactively deal with crimes perpetrated against tourists. The Unit was first launched at Victoria Falls as a pilot project but it has since cascaded to other tourist resort centres like the Great Zimbabwe Monuments, Chinhoyi Caves and Kariba Dam.

Tourism Police officers are also found in all the country's entry and exit points and identifiable through their reflective vests inscribed 'ZRP Tourism Police Unit'.

=== National Traffic Branch ===
The National Traffic Branch is committed to providing a road policing service which embraces enforcement and education aimed at enhancing public safety

=== Victim Friendly Unit ===
The Victim Friendly Unit was established in 1996 primarily to proactively and re-actively police crimes of sexual nature committed against women and children in a manner sensitive to the victim. The Unit aims to be supportive of victims and to make the environment conducive, private and friendly. It further aims to be empathetic, meticulous, professional, expeditious, and maintain confidentiality when handling victims of sexual abuse. Protection of victims who have suffered or who are at the risk of suffering serious harm and ensuring that all reasonable efforts are made to safely maintain children in their own homes once abuse or neglect has been discovered or disclosed is one of its aims. In 2007. following the promulgation of the Domestic Violence Act, the Unit's mandated was amended to also include the policing of domestic violence.

The Unit has also joined hands with other stakeholders in the multi-sector management of child abuse. Various methods of giving information on abuse whilst remaining anonymous like suggestion boxes and hotlines are also being marketed. In addition, victims are encouraged to report their cases direct to Victim Friendly Unit Coordinators who are found at each and every station.

Victim Friendly Unit Co-coordinators are trained to deal with victims in a professional, private and confidential manner. The issue of respect is highly regarded. The Victim Friendly Unit offers counselling to victims of sexual abuse in conjunction with its other partners in the multi-sectoral approach.

The Victim Friendly Unit is a source of hope for vulnerable victims who for decades have been prohibited by social attitudes, insensitivity and lack of professional handling on the part of the police.

Since the establishment of the Unit, a remarkable increase has been realised in the reported number of cases of sexual abuse. This is attributable to the fact that members of the public have generally been sensitized and now discern what constitute an abuse and also another reason is that of the availability of good reporting system and the sensitivity of those receiving the reports

== Rank structure ==
Officers

Rank group	National Command		Provincial Command				District Command		Station Command
Zimbabwe Republic Police (2018–Present)
Zimbabwe Republic Police (2018–Present)	Commissioner-general	Deputy commissioner-general	Commissioner		Assistant commissioner		Chief superintendent	Superintendent	Chief inspector	Inspector	Assistant inspector
Zimbabwe Republic Police (2008–2018)
Zimbabwe Republic Police (2008–2018)	Commissioner-general	Deputy commissioner-general	Commissioner		Senior assistant commissioner	Assistant commissioner	Chief superintendent	Superintendent	Chief inspector	Inspector
Zimbabwe Republic Police (1980–2008)
Zimbabwe Republic Police (1980–2008)			Commissioner	Deputy commissioner	Senior assistant commissioner	Assistant commissioner	Chief superintendent	Superintendent	Chief inspector	Inspector

Other ranks

Rank group	Section Leaders/Discipline					General Duty Police officers
Zimbabwe Republic Police (2018–Present)
Zimbabwe Republic Police (2018–Present)				Sergeant major	Sergeant	Constable
Zimbabwe Republic Police (1990–2018)
Zimbabwe Republic Police (1990–2018)	Assistant inspector			Sergeant major	Sergeant	Constable
Zimbabwe Republic Police (1980–1990)
Zimbabwe Republic Police (1980–1990)	Section officer	Senior patrol officer	Patrol officer		Sergeant	Constable

== Current pay grades (rank structure according to salary payments) ==
- Commissioner-General
- Deputy Commissioner-General
- Commissioner
- Assistant Commissioner
- Chief Superintendent
- Superintendent
- Chief Inspector
- Inspector
- Graduate Assistant Inspector
- Assistant Inspector
- Sergeant Major
- Graduate Sergeant
- Sergeant
- Graduate Constable
- Constable
- Special Constable

== Commissioners and Commissioners-General ==
- Peter Allum (1 August 1980 – 6 February 1982)
- Jack Denley (6 February 1982 – July 1982)
- Wiridzayi Nguruve (July 1982 – February 1985)
- Henry Mukurazhizha (February 1985 – 19 December 1991)
- Augustine Chihuri (September 1993 – December 2017; acting from 18 December 1991)
- Godwin Matanga (19 December 2017 to 31 December 2024)
- Stephen Mutamba (since 1 January 2025)

== Criticism ==
Since 2000, the ZRP has faced criticism from Zimbabwean and international NGOs such as Amnesty International for alleged political bias and what is claimed to be its part in what many describe as a systematic violation of rights to freedom of expression, association and assembly. The then-Commissioner of the ZRP, Augustine Chihuri, was open about his political loyalty to President Robert Mugabe's administration, saying in 2001 "Many people say I am ZANU-PF. Today, I would like to make it public that I support ZANU-PF because it is the ruling party. If any other party comes to power, I will resign and let those who support it take over". Police corruption was also said to be rife.

== Notes ==
1. The Military Balance 2003/2004, International Institute for Strategic Studies
2. Amnesty International, AFR 46/003/2005
3. Daily News, Harare, 2 June 2001
