= Mugabe family =

Zimbabwean political family

Mugabe
- Political family
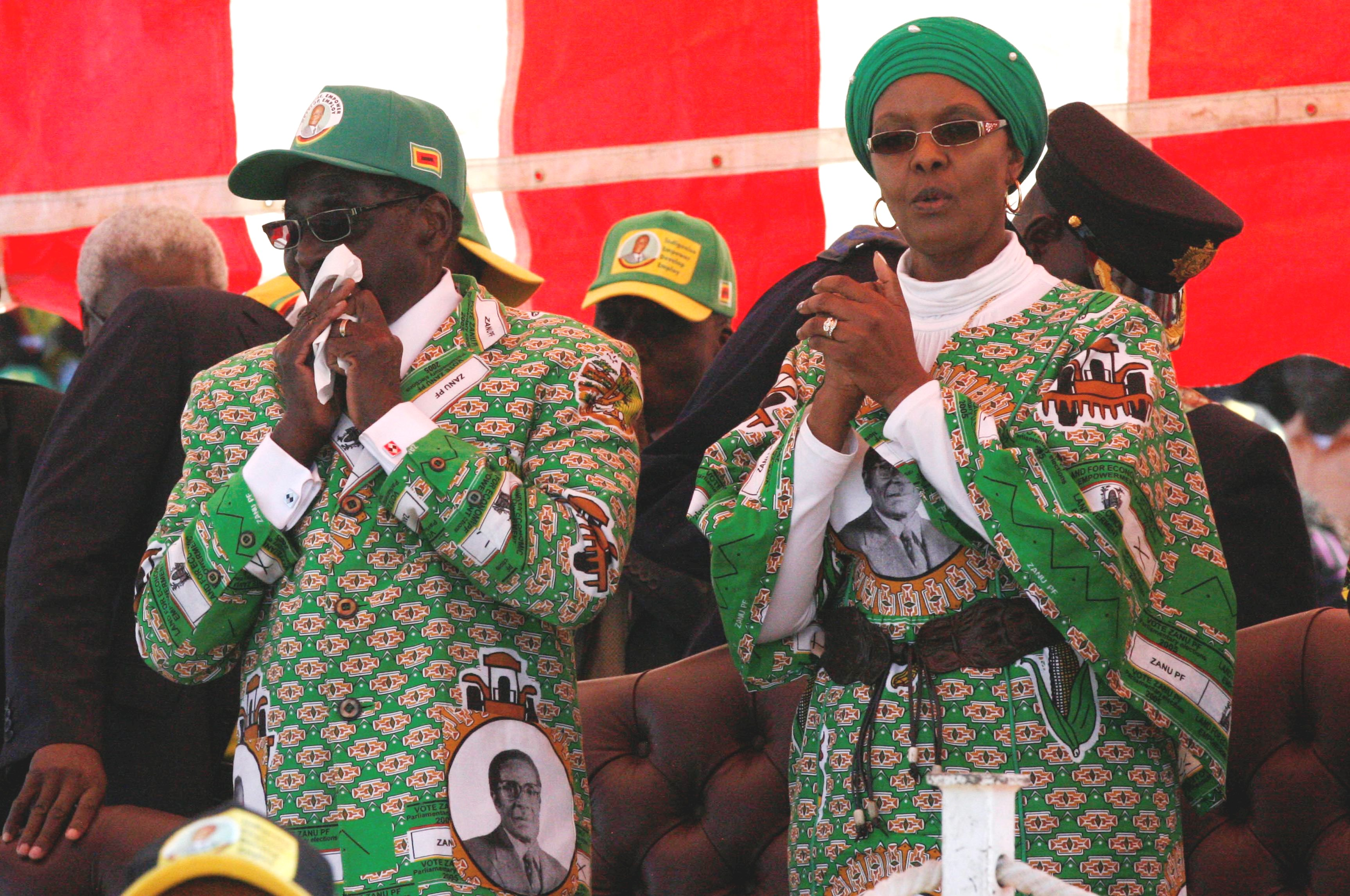
- Robert and Grace Mugabe in 2013

The Mugabe family is a Zimbabwean family. Many of its members are involved in politics and business. It includes former president Robert Mugabe and former first lady Grace Mugabe.

== Members ==
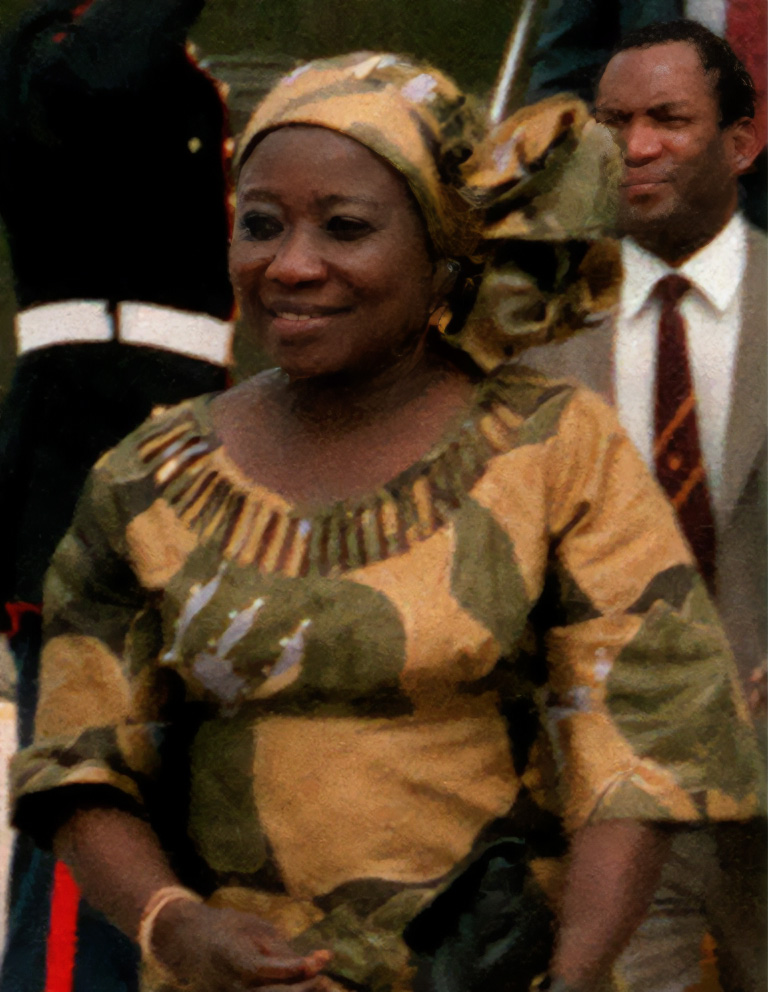
Sally Mugabe, 1983

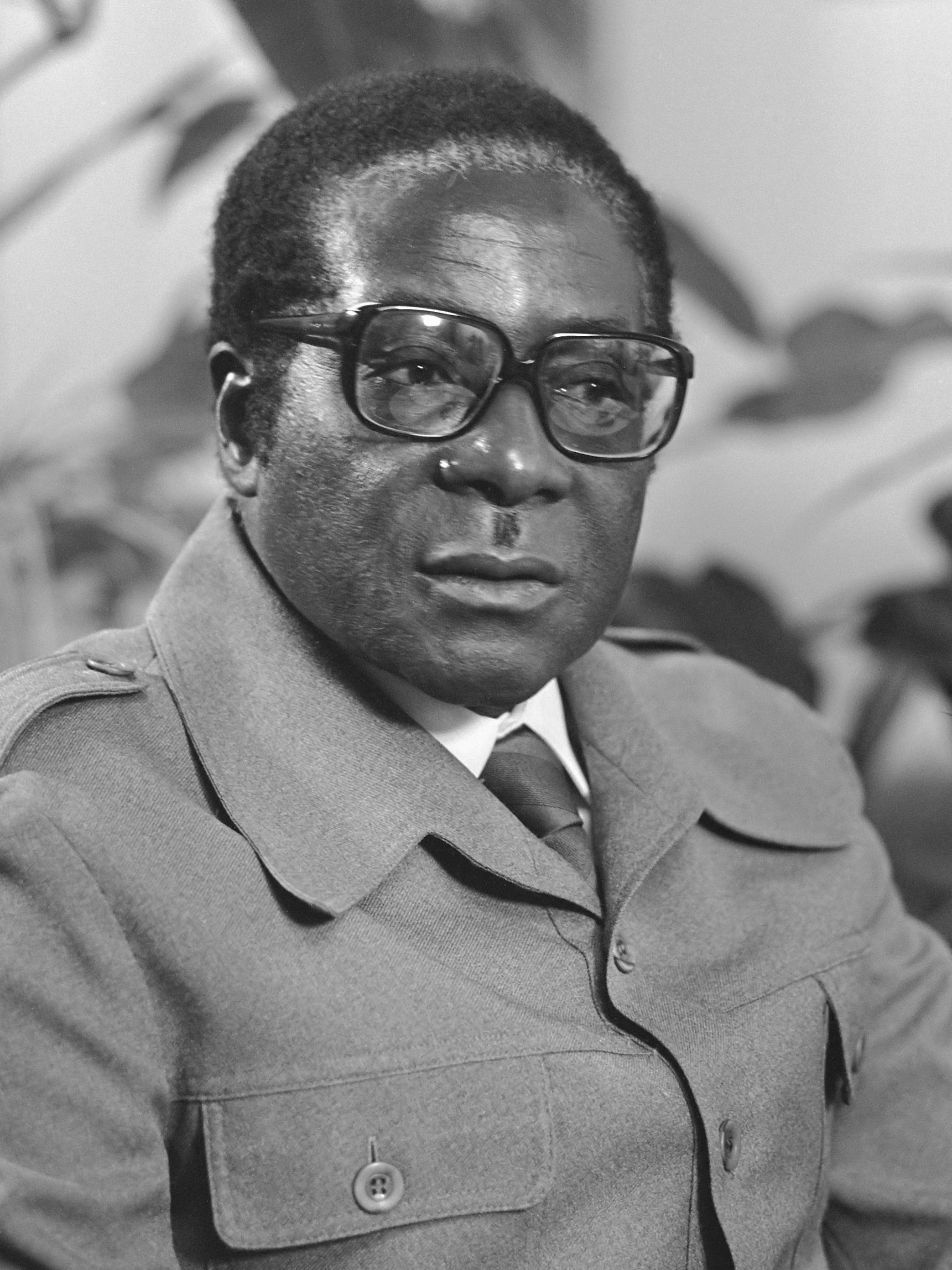
Robert Mugabe in 1979

- Robert Mugabe (21 February 1924 – 6 September 2019), revolutionary, Prime Minister of Zimbabwe from 1980 to 1987, President from 1987 to 2017 leader of the Zimbabwe African National Union from 1975 to 1980 and leader of ZANU – Patriotic Front from 1980 to 2017.
- Sarah Francesca "Sally" Mugabe (née Hayfron; born 6 June 1931 Gold Coast, Ghana, died 27 January 1992) first wife of Robert, First Lady of Zimbabwe from 1987 to 1992.
- Nhamodzenyika Mugabe (1963 – 1966) Robert's first son, born in Ghana to mother Sally, died three years later of malaria.
- Grace Mugabe (née Marufu born 23 July 1965) entrepreneur, politician a First Lady of Zimbabwe from 1996 to 2017
- Robert Mugabe Jr., second son of Robert and Grace, fashion designer, born 2 April 1992
- Chatunga Bellarmine Mugabe, youngest son of Robert and Grace
- Bona Mugabe (born 18 April 1988), the only daughter of Robert and Grace, business person
- Sandra Mugabe, Robert's niece, is married to Adam Molai, founder and longtime chairman of Pacific Cigarette Company

== Offices held ==
- Prime Minister of Zimbabwe, 1980 – 1987
- President of Zimbabwe, 1987 – 2017
- Zimbabwe African National Union leader, 1975 – 1980
- ZANU – Patriotic Front leader, 1980 – 2017
- First Lady of Zimbabwe, 1987 – 1992 and 1996 – 2017
