= Mugabe (disambiguation) =

Robert Mugabe (1924–2019) was the second president of Zimbabwe.

Mugabe may also refer to:

- Omugabe or the Mugabe, a title given to kings of Ankole of Uganda

== People with the surname ==
- Aristide Mugabe (born 1988), Rwandan basketball player
- Grace Mugabe (born 1965), second wife of Robert Mugabe
- Innocent Mugabe, Kenyan politician
- Robert Freeman Mugabe, Ugandan military officer
- Sally Mugabe (1931–1992), first wife of Robert Mugabe

== People with the given name ==
- Mugabe Were (1968–2008), Kenyan politician

== Other uses ==
- Mugabe family, a political family in Zimbabwe
