= Mugabo =

Mugabo is a surname. Notable people with the surname include:

- Alfred Mugabo (born 1995), Rwandan footballer
- Carlos Mugabo (born 1987), American basketball player
- Sonia Mugabo, Rwandan businesswoman and fashion designer
- Stella Ford Mugabo (born 1962), Rwandan politician

== See also ==
- Mugabe (disambiguation)
