= Bona Mugabe =

Zimbabwean businesswoman (born 1988)

- Born: Nyepudzayi Bona Mugabe; 18 April 1988 (age 38); Harare, Zimbabwe
- Education: Dominican Convent High School
- Alma mater: City University of Hong Kong (MBA); Management Development Institute of Singapore (MSc)
- Spouse: Simba Chikore (m. 2014; div. 2023)
- Children: 3
- Parents: Robert Mugabe; Grace Marufu Mugabe
- Relatives: Robert Mugabe Jr. and Bellarmine (brothers)

Nyepudzayi Bona Mugabe (born 18 April 1988) is a Zimbabwean businesswoman. She is the only daughter of former and late Zimbabwean President Robert Mugabe and Grace Mugabe, who also have two sons (Chatunga and Robert Jr.). She shares a name with Robert Mugabe's mother.

== Education ==
Bona Mugabe attended Dominican Convent Primary School. She also attended the Dominican Convent High School in Harare, Zimbabwe.

In 2008, Bona Mugabe was deported from Australia while studying there along with seven other children of senior members of the Mugabe regime. The Australian government said that they did not want the children of those responsible for human rights abuses in Zimbabwe to get an education unavailable to the ordinary Zimbabwean citizen. She then enrolled in Autumn 2008 under an alias at the City University of Hong Kong, although initial reports erroneously said she had enrolled at the University of Hong Kong. Her being in Hong Kong was discovered by media after her mother, Grace Mugabe allegedly assaulted British photojournalist Richard Jones for taking pictures of her shopping in Tsim Sha Tsui in January 2009. The report prompted Emily Lau Wai-hing, a member of the Legislative Council of Hong Kong, to request a review of the decision to admit Bona Mugabe.

News of Bona Mugabe studying in Hong Kong reached Zimbabwe at the same time as tuition fee increases, dollarisation of fees, and US$400 examination fees were announced. Protest started on the University of Zimbabwe campus in early February, and over several weeks saw police use tear gas in a failed attempt to stop them reaching downtown Harare. In the end, at least 60 students were arrested. The Zimbabwe National Students Union also delivered a petition to the Chinese embassy in Harare calling on the Chinese government to deport Bona Mugabe so she would be forced to attend a university in her home country. The union also called for the university to expel her even if the government did not deport her.

On 17 February the University of Hong Kong distanced itself from the controversy, denying a report that she was a student there. The school statement said "We do not have a student by the name of Bona Mugabe on our student register, and we do not have any lady student from Zimbabwe who is reading for an undergraduate programme or is at the age of around 20." Subsequent reports clarified that Bona was in fact enrolled in a second school, the City University of Hong Kong, which said she met normal admission requirements and her enrollment was not influenced by her parentage. Due to the attention surrounding Robert Mugabe's daughters her family enlisted the help of a female ex-government official to provide safety and supervision during her time in Hong Kong.

In 2009, Bona Mugabe's bodyguards were accused of assaulting reporters near Bona Mugabe's home in Hong Kong, but no charges were laid. In 2011, Bona Mugabe graduated with an honours degree in accounting and administration. Her father attended her graduation ceremony that November while en route to talks in Beijing and praised the Hong Kong government for protecting her from British journalists. She subsequently also earned a master's degree in banking and finance from the Management Development Institute of Singapore.

== Career ==
In March 2015, while her mother was sick, Bona Mugabe was part of Zimbabwe's official delegation during a state visit to Japan, and sat by her father's side during a meeting with Japanese Prime Minister Shinzō Abe. Her presence was criticized by Movement for Democratic Change – Tsvangirai, the leading opposition party in Zimbabwe as evidence of a Mugabe dynasty.

In May 2017, she was appointed a member of the country's Board of Censors, and as a member of the board of Empower Bank, a proposed microfinance bank run by the National Indigenisation and Economic Empowerment Board of Zimbabwe.

In December 2017, The Daily Telegraph reported that Bona Mugabe had hired Chinese builders to construct a mansion on state land originally designated for a school by the Harare city council.

== Personal life ==
In 2014 Bona Mugabe married Simba Chikore, subsequently appointed as chief operating officer at Air Zimbabwe. The marriage took place at her father Robert Mugabe's private residence in Harare and cost US$4.49 million. In April 2016, the couple had their first child, a son named Simbanashe Chikore, in a hospital in Singapore. Simbanashe Chikore is also the first grandson of Robert Mugabe. After nine years of marriage, Bona Mugabe filed for divorce in March of 2023.

Chikore resigned from Air Zimbabwe after the 2017 coup d'état. According to the Zimbabwe Independent, Bona Mugabe, her husband, and their son had left the country for Malaysia in the aftermath of her father's resignation, and that she was expecting her second child.

On June 7, 2018, Zimbabwe police arrested Chikore on charges of kidnapping after it was reported that he locked Air Zimbabwe lawyer Bertha Zakeyo in her office after accusing her of selling confidential information about the airline to labor groups. He has been accused of purging staff and covering up information surrounding a plane which had delivered from Malaysia and which also was grounded due to maintenance problems. Police spokeswoman Charity Charimba afterwards stated that Chikore was not released from custody. In June 2021, Harare magistrate threw out charges against Simba Chikore, meaning he had been cleared of wrongdoing by the courts.

When Bona Mugabe filed for divorce from her husband Simba Mutsahuni Chikore in March 2023, divorce court papers alleged that she owned 25 residential properties, including a Dubai mansion, worth a total of around $80m.

== See also ==
- Mugabe family
