= Dominican Convent High School =

Location
- Harare; Zimbabwe
- 17.8224°S 31.0519°E

Information
- Type: Independent high school
- Motto: Veritas (Latin: Truth)
- Denomination: Catholic
- Founded: 18 October 1892; 133 years ago
- Founder: Mother Patrick Cosgrove
- Sister school: St. George's College
- Gender: Girls
- Website: www.conventharare.co.zw

Dominican Convent High School (commonly referred to as Convent) is a private Catholic day school for girls in Harare, Zimbabwe. One of the oldest established schools in Zimbabwe, Dominican Convent was founded in 1892 by Mother Patrick Cosgrave, an Irish nun, with 10 pupils.

The school was co-educational, but after ten years, a separate school, Hartmann House, was established for boys.

Mother Patrick founded the Dominican Convent in Harare in 1892. She also started the first hospital in what was then Southern Rhodesia. There is a museum commemorating her in the grounds of the Mukwati Building on Fourth Street in Harare, in what was the original hospital's mortuary.

== Academic ==
The Dominican Convent is an all-girls school. The Primary school is run by Sister Irene and the High school by Sister Kudzai. There are three streams from Form 1 to Form 4. Form 1 to Form 2 follow the same curriculum consisting of English, Mathematics, Religious and Moral Education, Science, French, Shona, History, Geography, Art, Food & Nutrition, Fashion & Fabric, Computers, Education for Life, Music and Physical Education. Form 3 and 4 have a variety of subject options. In Form 3, the girls write a national paper called ZIMSEC for Shona and history (both being optional) and English language, which is compulsory. Cambridge 'O' Level Examinations are written at Form 4 Level. The Sixth Form has three streams: Business Administration, which focuses on tourism and secretary courses, Arts and Sciences. Cambridge 'A' Level Examinations are written at the end of Upper Six, with students now able to write the Cambridge 'AS' Level Examinations, at the end of their Lower Six year as of 2019.

The Primary school caters for pupils of ages 5 – 13. These are formally called grades which start from grade 1 to grade seven. At grade seven pupils write a national exam called ZIMSEC. If the pupil passes with a pass usually known as 5 points or fail with a maximum of 25 points they are awarded a certificate.

- Cambridge International Examinations for both IGCSE, O Level, AS and A Level
- ZIMSEC O Level
- City and Guilds

== Sports ==
Dominican Convent offers sporting activities including athletics, basketball, field hockey, indoor hockey, golf, karate, soccer, swimming, tennis, rugby, squash, netball, volleyball, table tennis, and aerobics.

== Cultural activities ==
The school offers various extra curricular activities including chess (one of the best girls' teams in the country), Quiz, Debate, Public speaking clubs (Gavel club, Toastmasters and Orators), First Aid, Choir (English choir and Shona choir) Lifeline, International Current Affairs, Interact and Wildlife.

== Notable alumni ==
- Maggie Chapman - Member of the Scottish Parliament, former Rector of the University of Aberdeen, former Co-convener of the Scottish Green Party
- Kirsty Coventry - President of the International Olympic Committee, 2004 and 2008 Olympic gold medalist
- Bona Mugabe - daughter of former Zimbabwean President Robert Gabriel Mugabe
- Chipo Chung - actress; daughter of former Minister of Education of Zimbabwe Fay Chung
- Haru Mutasa - journalist
- Doris Lessing - 2007 Nobel Prize in Literature Laureate
- Danai Gurira - actor and playwright
- Sister Catherine Jackson - founder of the Dorothy Duncan Braille Library
- Lisa Doris Armstrong - founder of Ugogo Africa

== Achievements ==
Dominican Convent Harare was rated in the Top Ten High Schools in Zimbabwe. In 2010, the Lower Six Management of Business company, Lynx, came first in the national Junior Achievement competition. Lynx came third in the regional JA competition.

== See also ==
- List of schools in Zimbabwe
- Education in Zimbabwe
