= Jan III =

Jan III may refer to:

- Jan III van Diest (died 1340)
- Jan III of Oświęcim (1366–1405)
- Jan III van Montfoort (c. 1448 – 1522)
- John III, Lord of Bergen op Zoom (1452–1532)
- John III Sobieski (1629–1696)

- Jan III Sobieski High School in Kraków
- Jan III Sobieski (cigarette)
