= British American Tobacco =

British multinational tobacco company

British American Tobacco p.l.c.

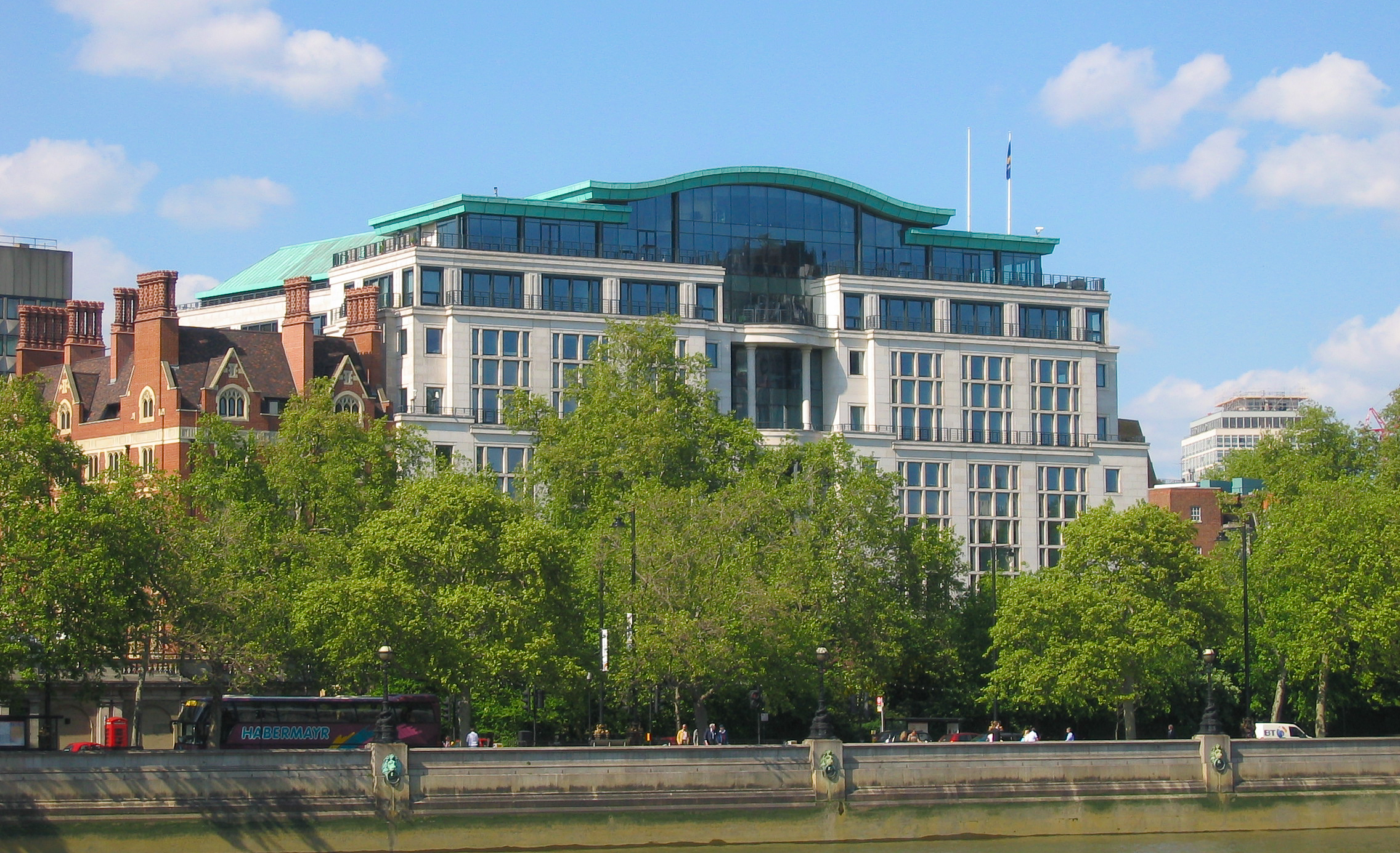
- The Globe House, headquarters of British American Tobacco in London, as seen from River Thames
- Formerly: Measureprofit Public Limited Company (1997–1998)
- Type: Public
- Traded as: LSE: BATS; NYSE: BTI (ADS); JSE: BTI; KN: BAT; FTSE 100 component (BATS)
- Industry: Tobacco
- Predecessors: Imperial Tobacco; American Tobacco Company
- Founded: September 1902; 124 years ago
- Founders: James Buchanan Duke
- Headquarters: London, England, UK
- Area served: Worldwide
- Key people: Luc Jobin (chairman); Tadeu Marroco (CEO)
- Products: Cigarettes; Nicotine pouches; Electronic cigarettes
- Revenue: ▼£25.610 billion (2025)
- Operating income: ▲£9.997 billion (2025)
- Net income: ▲£7.765 billion (2025)
- Number of employees: 48,000 (2026)
- Subsidiaries: Reynolds American; Imperial Tobacco Canada; Bentoel Group; Souza Cruz; Niemeyer; Tekel; Pakistan Tobacco Company; Ceylon Tobacco Company (84%)
- Website: bat.com

British American Tobacco p.l.c. (BAT) is a British-American multinational company that manufactures and sells cigarettes, tobacco and other nicotine products including electronic cigarettes. The company, established in 1902, is headquartered in London, England. As of 2025, it is the second-largest tobacco company in the world based on net sales.

BAT has operations in around 180 countries and its cigarette brands include Dunhill, Kent, Lucky Strike, Pall Mall and Rothmans. Its brands also include Vuse e-cigarettes, Glo heated tobacco, and Velo nicotine pouches.

BAT has a primary listing on the London Stock Exchange and is a constituent of the FTSE 100 Index. It has a secondary listing on the Johannesburg Stock Exchange. BAT plc ordinary shares are also listed on the New York Stock Exchange in the form of American Depositary Shares.

== History ==
=== 1902 to 2000 ===
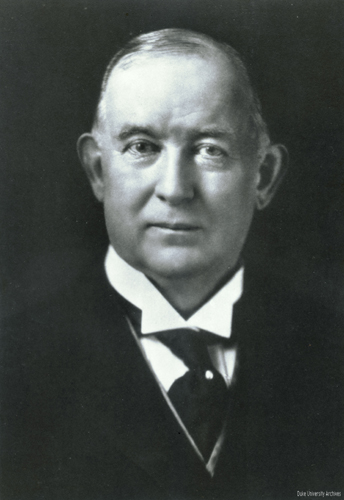
James Buchanan Duke, founder of American Tobacco Co., became chairman of the joint venture.

The company was formed in 1902, when the United Kingdom's Imperial Tobacco Company and the United States' American Tobacco Company agreed to form a joint venture, the "British-American Tobacco Company Ltd." The parent companies agreed not to trade in each other's domestic territory and to assign trademarks, export businesses and overseas subsidiaries to the joint venture. At its foundation James Buchanan Duke was the chairman, with Henry Herbert Wills the deputy chairman; initial senior managers included Hugo Cunliffe-Owen (the protégé of Harry Wills and later BAT's Chairman) and Albert Jeffress (later Deputy Chairman). Trade was swiftly organised through existing agencies in countries as diverse as Canada, China, Germany, South Africa, New Zealand and Australia, but sales were not conducted in the United Kingdom or in the United States.

In China, BAT inherited a factory in the Pudong district of Shanghai from W.D. & H.O. Wills, one of the precursor companies of Imperial Tobacco. Under the management of James Augustus Thomas from Lawsonville, in North Carolina's Rockingham County, by 1919 the Shanghai factory was producing more than 243 million cigarettes per week. Thomas worked closely with the local Wing Tai Vo Tobacco Company, which developed into BAT's principal Chinese partner after its success with the "Ruby Queen" cigarette brand.

In 1911, the American Tobacco Company sold its share of the company following the US Supreme Court ruling on the dismemberment of Duke's corporation. While Imperial Tobacco remained the largest shareholder after this judgement it gradually reduced its shareholding; however, it was only in 1980 that it divested its remaining interests in BAT.

At its peak in 1937, BAT manufactured and distributed 55 billion cigarettes in China. The company's assets were seized by the Japanese in 1941 following their 1937 invasion. In 1949 the company was ejected from China following the foundation of the People's Republic.

In 1976 the Group companies were reorganised under a new holding company, "B.A.T. Industries". In 1994 BAT acquired its former parent, American Tobacco Company (though reorganised after anti-trust proceedings). This brought the Lucky Strike and Pall Mall brands into BAT's portfolio.

In 1999 it merged with Rothmans International, which included a share in a factory in Burma. This made it the target of criticism from human rights groups. It sold its share of the factory in 2003 after an "exceptional request" from the British government.

=== 2000 to present ===
In 2002, BAT lost a lawsuit about the right to sell cigarettes under the Marlboro brand name in the UK. It had acquired Rothmans, which had previously bought a licence to use the name from Philip Morris. Philip Morris' attorneys invoked a get-out clause for the case of a major change of ownership.

In 2003, BAT acquired Ente Tabacchi Italiani (ETI) S.p.A., Italy's state tobacco company. The important acquisition would elevate BAT to the number two position in Italy, the second largest tobacco market in the European Union. The scale of the enlarged operations would bring significant opportunities to compete and grow ETI's local brands and BAT's international brands.

In August 2003, BAT acquired a 67.8% holding in the Serbian tobacco company Duvanska Industrija Vranje (DIV), allowing local manufacture of its brands, freeing them from import duties. In the longer term, export opportunities are planned as neighbouring countries in south east Europe developed free trade agreements.

In July 2004, the U.S. business of British American Tobacco (Brown & Williamson) was combined with that of R. J. Reynolds Tobacco Company (R. J. Reynolds), under the R. J. Reynolds name. R. J. Reynolds and Brown & Williamson were the second and third-ranking U.S. tobacco companies prior to the combination. When they combined, R. J. Reynolds became a subsidiary of Reynolds American, with BAT holding a 42% share.

In January 2007, BAT closed its remaining UK production plant in Southampton with the loss of over 600 jobs. However, the global research and development operation, and some financial functions, continue on the site. Then in 2008, BAT acquired Turkey's state-owned cigarette maker Tekel. In July 2008, BAT acquired the cigarette and snus operations of the Scandinavian Tobacco Group. BAT acquired 60% of Indonesia's Bentoel Group in 2009 before increasing its stake to 100% the following year. In May 2011, BAT acquired the Colombian company Productora Tabacalera de Colombia S.A.S. (Protabaco). In October 2015, BAT acquired the Croatian tobacco company TDR d.o.o. Brands and Factory in Kanfanar.

In October 2016, BAT offered to buy the remaining 57.8 per cent of U.S. cigarette maker Reynolds American in a $47 billion takeover that would create the world's biggest listed tobacco company with brands including Newport, Lucky Strike and Pall Mall. In January 2017, Reynolds agreed to an increased $49.4 billion deal. The deal was completed in July 2017. In April 2017, the company announced the acquisition of a number of Bulgarian cigarette brands from Bulgartabac for more than €100 million.

In March 2021, the company bought a stake of close to 20% in the Canada-based cannabis producer OrganiGram for about £126 million as part of a diversification strategy.

In May 2023, the company's chief executive, Jack Bowles, resigned with immediate effect. He was replaced by Tadeu Marroco, who had been finance director for four years. On 14 September 2023, the company announced the sale of BAT Russia to a consortium led by local management. BAT Russia changed its name to the International Tobacco Marketing Services Group.

In June 2026, the company announced it would cut 5,500 jobs and outsource a further 3,500, approximately 20% of its 47,000 strong workforce. It was expected this would save about £600m a year by 2028. Chief executive Tadeu Marroco said these cuts would make the company "more agile, cost disciplined and technology enabled".

== Operations ==
The company offers an extensive range of brands:

=== Current ===
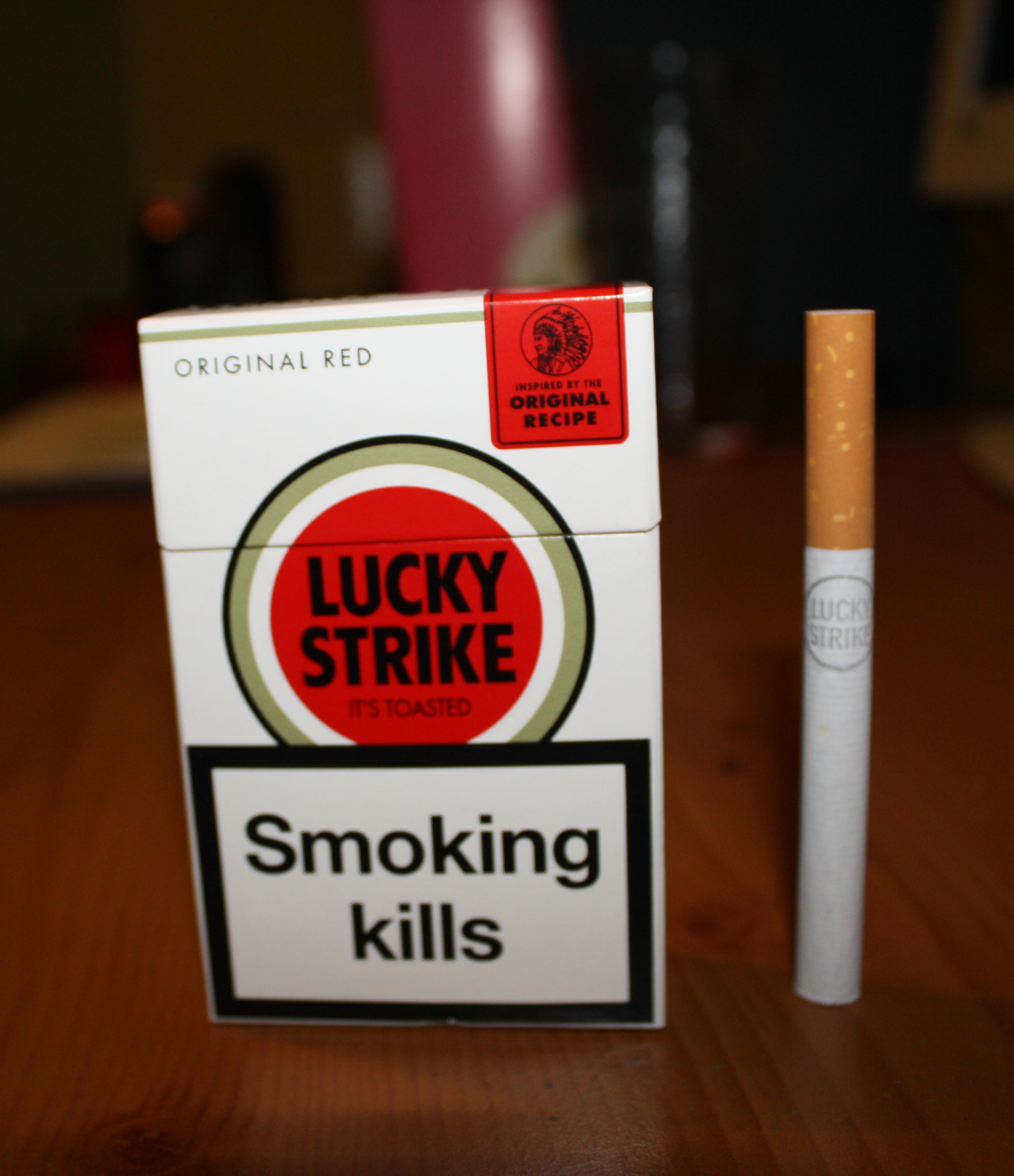
One of British American Tobacco's most popular products "Lucky Strike"

Global brands include Dunhill, Kent, North State, Lucky Strike, Pall Mall, Vogue, Rothmans International, Winfield, State Express 555, KOOL, and Viceroy. BAT does not necessarily own the rights to all of these brands in every nation they are marketed.

Local brands owned by British American Tobacco include: Benson & Hedges, John Players Gold Leaf, Dunhill, Lucky Strike, Hollywood, Derby (Bangladesh), State Express 555 (Vietnam), Belmont (Colombia, Chile, Nicaragua and Venezuela), Jockey Club (Argentina), Stradbroke (Australia), Hollywood, Derby, Free, Minister and Plaza (Brazil), du Maurier (Canada), Prince (Denmark), North State (Finland), HB (Germany), Sopianae (Hungary), Wills (India), Ardath, Bentoel, and Tali Jagat (Indonesia), Carrolls, Carrolls Kings, Grand Parade, Black Allen (Germany), Sweet Afton, Major (Ireland), Boots, Alas (Mexico), Gold Leaf (Bangladesh, Pakistan), Jan III Sobieski (Poland), Yava Gold (Russia), Courtleigh, Peter Styvesant (South Africa), Kent, Pall Mall, Perilly's, Peter Stuyvesant, and Rothmans (Malaysia), Parisienne (Switzerland), Kent and Maltepe (Turkey), Xon, Astra and Karvon (Uzbekistan), Craven A (Vietnam and Jamaica) as well as BAT snus, Holiday, Freedom and Park Drive (New Zealand), Royals (UK and Malta), Embassy (Kenya), Viceroy, Newport, Lucky Strike in Dominican Republic and Delta in El Salvador.

On 11 June 2006, R. J. Reynolds Tobacco Company announced that it would manufacture Camel brand snus in Sweden in partnership with British American Tobacco; the product would be test-marketed in Portland, Oregon and Austin, Texas by the end of the month.

=== Former ===
BAT has diversified into various fields at different times in its history. Its U.S. retail division, BATUS Retail Group, acquired Gimbels, Kohl's, and Saks Fifth Avenue in the 1970s and Marshall Field's and its divisions in 1982. It purchased the United Kingdom retail chain Argos in 1979. The company sold Kohl's grocery stores to A&P in 1983. In 1986, BATUS sold the Kohl's department stores and two Marshall Field's divisions, The Crescent and Frederick & Nelson; BATUS closed Gimbels the same year, with many locations being absorbed by sister division Marshall Field's, as well as Allied Stores' Stern's and Pomeroy's divisions. In 1990, Dayton Hudson Corporation (now Target Corporation) purchased Marshall Field's, Dillard's purchased Ivey's (another Marshall Field's division), Investcorp S.A. purchased Saks Fifth Avenue, and Argos was demerged (Argos was acquired by previous parent company GUS plc in 1998).

The Group was a major financial services company with the acquisitions of Eagle Star (1984), Allied Dunbar (1985) and the Farmers Group, Inc. (1988). Around 1996 British American Tobacco merged its financial operations into a single operating unit, British American Financial Services (BAFS). This division merged with Zurich Insurance Company in 1998 to form the Zurich Financial Services Group.

=== Corporate affairs ===
The company's board is chaired by Luc Jobin, appointed in 2021. Its non-executive board members are Holly Keller Koeppel, Kandy Anand, Karen Guerra, Murray Kessler, Véronique Laury, Darrell Thomas and Serpil Timuray.

== Other affiliates ==
British American Tobacco Ghana Limited is a public limited company operated by British American in Ghana. The company is listed (GSE: BAT) on the stock index of the Ghana Stock Exchange, the GSE All-Share Index. It was formed in 1999 out of a merger between the Pioneer Tobacco Company and Meridian Tobacco.

== Sponsorships ==
BAT holds a minority share in ITC Limited. ITC Limited sponsored the 1996 Cricket World Cup, which was named the "Wills World Cup" similarly to the ITC Limited owned Wills Navy Cut cigarette brand in India.

BAT previously sponsored the London Symphony Orchestra.

Furthermore, BAT established The British American Tobacco Internship program, which is designed to help new graduates gain experience in their chosen field of study in a dynamic global organization.

=== Formula One ===
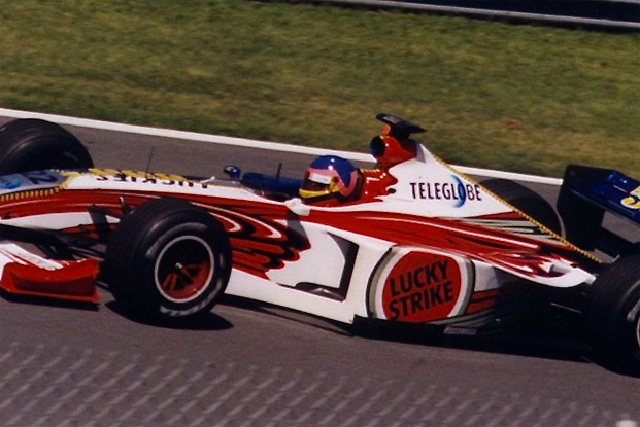
Jacques Villeneuve driving for BAR at the 1999 Canadian Grand Prix

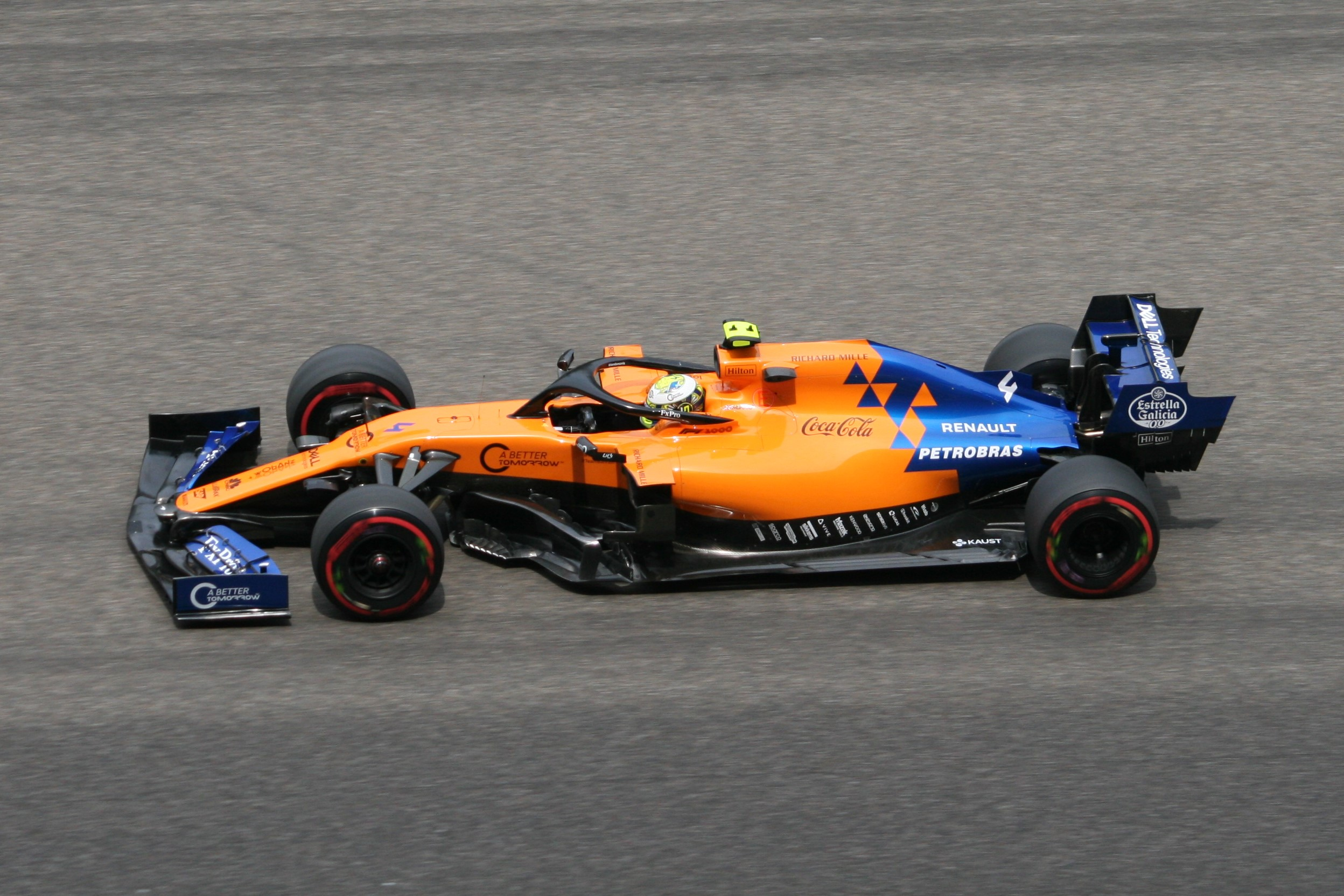

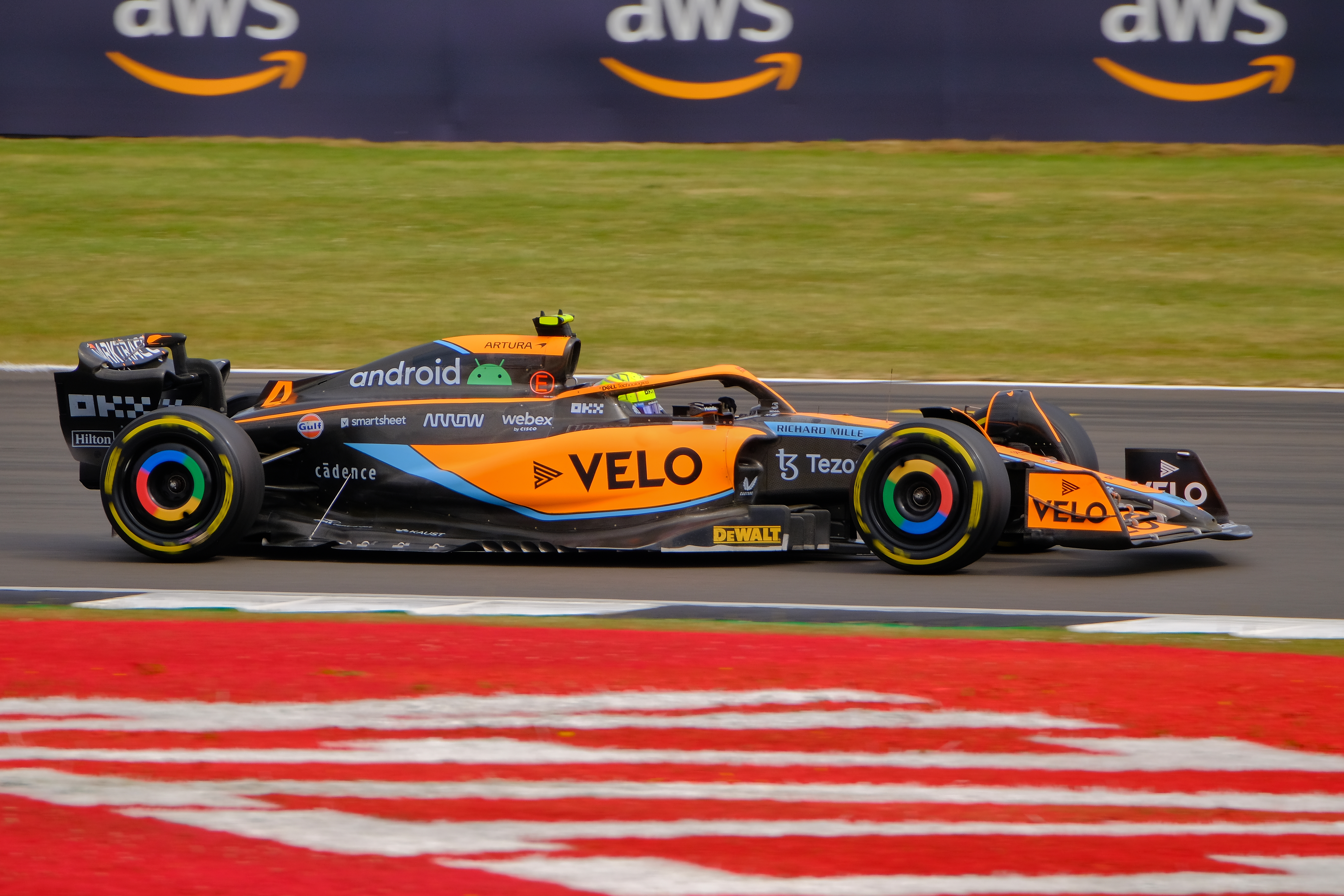
A Better Tomorrow being advertised on the McLaren MCL34 (top) and Velo being advertised on the McLaren MCL36 (bottom).

In 1997, BAT brought its participation in the sport to new levels with the purchase of Tyrrell for approximately £30 million. The team raced as Tyrrell for the 1998 season before being renamed as British American Racing (BAR).

In 2004, BAR announced that technology partner Honda had purchased a 45% stake and in September 2005, BAR announced that Honda would be buying the remaining 55% stake. The team raced as Honda Racing F1 Team in 2006, the last year of the Lucky Strike sponsorship before leaving the sport. This was due to a European Union directive that was brought into force in 2005 which required national governments to legislate to prevent tobacco sponsorship. All links between Honda and BAT were severed for 2007.

In 2019, McLaren signed a multi-year partnership deal with BAT through its transformation agenda "A Better Tomorrow", bringing the company back into Formula 1 for the first time since Honda succeeded BAR. This was also the second tobacco related deal signed since Formula 1 banned tobacco advertising in 2005. In late 2019, BAT and McLaren announced the signing of an enhanced partnership deal that saw BAT become a principal partner of McLaren with increased branding position.

McLaren advertises BAT's New Category product brands Vuse (previously Vype) and Velo (previously Lyft) on their F1 and IndyCar cars. Vuse also partnered with the McLaren F1 Team to race bespoke liveries designed by emerging artists for the 2021 to 2023 Abu Dhabi Grands Prix. In April 2024, McLaren announced a partnership extension with BAT, which includes the partnership being extended to the McLaren Formula E Team.

== Controversies ==
=== Ignoring the cancer risks of cigarettes ===
As far back as 1958, BAT had information that cigarettes cause cancer. Three senior BAT scientists – H.R. Bentley, D.G.I. Felton, and W.W. Reid – travelled to the United States that year and talked to dozens of experts inside and outside of the tobacco industry. According to industry documents, all but one of those consulted believed a connection between cigarettes and cancer had been proved.

=== Opposition to smoking bans in Islamic countries ===
Industry documents from the 1970s to the late 1990s shows that tobacco companies were seriously concerned about fatwas against smoking by Muslim jurists in Muslim majority countries. In 1996, an internal document from British American Tobacco warned that, because of the spread of "extremist views" from fundamentalists in countries such as Afghanistan, the industry would have to "prepare to fight a hurricane".

=== Nigerian lawsuit ===
The Nigerian federal government filed a lawsuit against BAT and two other tobacco companies in 2007. Nigeria sought $42.4 billion, $34.4 billion of which the government seeks in anticipation of the future cost of treating Nigerians for tobacco-related illnesses. It also sought $1.04 billion as a fine for the companies' advertising and marketing campaign allegedly targeting Nigerian youth, and has asked the companies to fund an awareness campaign to educate young people about the dangers of their product. Several Nigerian state governments filed similar petitions. The government withdrew its lawsuit in February 2008.

=== Marketing practices ===
In 2008, the company was the subject of a BBC Two documentary, in which Duncan Bannatyne investigated the marketing practices of the company in Africa and specifically the way the company targets younger Africans with branded music events, competitions and the sale of single cigarette sticks. Many of the practices uncovered by Bannatyne appeared to break BAT's own code of conduct and company standards. Towards the end of the programme, Bannatyne interviewed Chris Proctor, Head of Science and Regulation, in which Proctor admitted that advertisements targeting children from three African countries were 'disappointing'. In many of these undeveloped countries, the awareness of health risks from smoking is very low or nonexistent.

In September 2001, BAT invested US$7.1 million in North Korean state-owned enterprise called the Korea Sogyong Trading Corporation, which employs 200 people in Pyongyang to produce up to two billion cigarettes a year. The operation is run by BAT's Singapore Division. Brands of cigarettes produced are Kumgansan, Craven A and Viceroy. BAT claims that the cigarettes are produced only for consumption in North Korea, although there are allegations that the cigarettes are smuggled for sale overseas.

British American Tobacco was declared the winner of the 2008 Roger Award, the award for the worst transnational corporation operating in New Zealand.

British American Tobacco spent more than €700,000 lobbying the EU in 2008, up to four times as much as the company declared on the EU's register of interest representatives, according to a report by Corporate Europe Observatory. The report argues that BAT's hidden lobbying activities, which are clearly not in the public interest, should be exposed to public scrutiny.

=== Canadian class action lawsuit ===
The three largest Canadian tobacco companies, Imperial Tobacco Canada (a division of British American Tobacco), JTI-Macdonald Corp and Rothmans Benson & Hedges, were the subject of the largest class action lawsuit in Canadian history. The case started on 12 March 2012 in Quebec Superior Court, and the companies face a potential payout of C$27 billion (US$21.6 billion) in damages and penalties. In addition, a number of Canadian provinces are teaming to sue tobacco companies to recover healthcare costs caused by smoking.

On 1 June 2015, Quebec Superior Court Justice Brian Riordan has awarded more than $15 billion to Quebec smokers in a landmark case that pitted them against three Canadian cigarette giants, including JTI-Macdonald Corp.

=== Australian lawsuit ===
In 2012, British American Tobacco, along with Philip Morris International and Imperial Tobacco, sued the Australian Commonwealth government. At the High Court of Australia, they argued that the Commonwealth's plain packaging legislation was unconstitutional because it usurped the companies' intellectual property rights and good will on other than just terms. However, the challenge was unsuccessful.

=== HMRC fine for oversupply ===
In November 2014, Her Majesty's Revenue and Customs (HMRC) fined BAT £650,000 after it determined that the company glutted the Belgian market with tobacco products with the likelihood these products would illegally find themselves back into the UK, with UK excise taxes not paid. The event highlighted a tobacco-smuggling issue that many anti-tobacco activists have been attempting to bring to light for years. Following several investigations, HMRC reportedly seized more than 1.4 billion cigarettes and 330 tons of hand rolling tobacco in 2013–2014. BAT denied all claims and described the allegation and fine as "unjustified".

=== Bribery and threats in Africa ===
In late November 2015, an episode of BBC's Panorama programme alleged that BAT was bribing officials in Rwanda, Burundi and Kenya in exchange for their limiting the implementation of the WHO's Framework Convention on Tobacco Control in their respective countries. The episode showed documents provided by whistleblower Paul Hopkins, who worked for BAT in Kenya for 13 years. BAT denied the claims.

In 2017, it was reported that BAT and other tobacco companies used a mixture of threats and bullying behaviour to stop or lessen the implementation of anti-smoking legislation in at least eight African countries. One document showed that in Uganda BAT stated that the Tobacco Control Act flew in the face of the country's constitution. Another document showed that lawyers acting on behalf of BAT requested that the high court in Kenya "quash in its entirety" anti-smoking legislation.

The Serious Fraud Office opened a 'formal investigation' in August 2017 based on the dossier of evidence supplied by former employee and whistleblower Paul Hopkins. The formal investigation is based on claims by Hopkins that BAT had paid bribes to government officials in Kenya, Burundi, Rwanda and Comoros to undermine tobacco control regulations in the African market which is the only market showing growth. BAT responded by classifying Hopkins as "a rogue former employee". BAT Chief Executive Nico Durante said BAT operated in 200 countries and he could not give a 100% guarantee that everything was being done by the book.

In January 2021, the Serious Fraud Office closed its investigation into corruption at BAT after concluding that the evidence gathered “did not meet the evidential test for prosecution as defined in the Code for Crown Prosecutors”.

On 14 September 2021, in a report published by the NGO STOP, the NGO accused British American Tobacco of having distributed more than $600,000 in the form of cash, cars or campaign donations to dozens of politicians, legislators, civil servants, journalists and employees of competing companies between 2008 and 2013.

In November 2012, the Zimbabwean government arrested several people for spying on factories owned by local tobacco companies, including Pacific Cigarette Company (PCC). BAT's involvement was suspected but not proven. Later that month, President Robert Mugabe accused BAT of spying and hijacking PCC trucks to "kill competition". In September 2021, a BBC Panorama investigation found evidence that BAT had enlisted Forensic Security Services, a South African Security firm, to sabotage and surveil factories owned by competitors, including PCC. After the spies were arrested, BAT negotiated a bribe so that the government would release them from jail.

=== Pakistani lobbying efforts ===
In April 2015, medical experts and anti-tobacco campaigners accused Philip Barton, the British High Commissioner to Pakistan, of lobbying for BAT interests. The group released photos showing Barton attending a meeting on 13 March in Islamabad, where BAT executives attempted to convince the Pakistani Finance and Health Minister to veto plans requiring large health warnings on cigarette packets. This activity was deemed contrary to Foreign and Commonwealth Office (FCO) policy. It followed an earlier incident when the British Ambassador to Panama was reprimanded for similar activity on BAT's behalf.

=== Tobacco marketing in unstable nations and conflict zones ===
In August 2017, former employee and whistleblower Paul Hopkins released internal documents to The Guardian, a British newspaper, claiming British American Tobacco actively made efforts to market and sell its products in unstable, deeply impoverished nations and conflict zones, including Somalia, South Sudan, Syria and Iraq. Leaked PowerPoint presentations from 2011 included details of strategies to continue selling black market cigarettes "in black paper bags" in parts of Somalia controlled by the fundamentalist Islamic militant group Al-Shabaab, plans to develop "a consumer relevant brand portfolio" and "sustainable... volume growth" in South Sudan just two days before the nation gained independence, and the active marketing and growth of the Kent cigarette brand in Iraq and Syria, despite "volatile markets" in the middle of the Iraq War and Syrian Civil War, respectively.

In February 2021, the Organized Crime and Corruption Reporting Network (OCCRP) published an investigation according to which trafficking of BAT cigarettes had helped finance jihadist and separatist groups in northern Mali using, among other mechanisms, a system of oversupplying the country with tobacco. This has allowed billions of cigarettes to be smuggled out of the country.

In April 2023, a subsidiary admitted that it had sold cigarettes to North Korea. This act is a violation of the existing sanctions imposed by the US against North Korea. Based on the investigations of US authorities, the activity spanned for ten years, from 2007 to 2017. Because of this breach, BAT is obligated to pay $635m (£512m) and interests to US authorities. Attorney General Matthew Olsen, Department of Justice's assistant described the settlement fee as DOJ's first and largest single North Korean sanctions penalty.

== See also ==
- Big Tobacco
