= ZANU–PF Women's League =

- Secretary: Mabel Chinomona
- Founded: 1977; 49 years ago
- Headquarters: Harare, Zimbabwe
- Ideology: Populism; Pan-Africanism; Revolutionary socialism

Website
- www.zanupf.org.zw/womens-league

The ZANU–PF Women's League is the women's wing of the Zimbabwe African National Union – Patriotic Front (ZANU–PF), the ruling political party of Zimbabwe.

It was founded in 1977 by Zimbabwe African National Union nationalists in Xai-Xai, Mozambique. Founding members were said to include Mavis Chidzonga, Oppah Muchinguri, Joice Mujuru, Naomi Nhiwatiwa, and Julia Zvobgo, among others. The first ZANU Women's Congress was held in Mozambique in 1978; there, Sally Mugabe was elected head of the Women's League. The Women's League held its first conference from 15–17 March 1984, before the ZANU Congress which occurred several months later. The Women's League put forward Joice Mujuru as a candidate for Vice-President in 2004, an office she held for ten years. First Lady Grace Mugabe was head of the league from 2014 until her expulsion from the party amidst the 2017 coup d'état.

The Women's League held its seventh elective conference in Harare from 23–26 June 2022, with a keynote address delivered by President Emmerson Mnangagwa. At the conference, Senate President Mabel Chinomona was reelected as the league's secretary.

== Secretaries ==
The secretary is the head of the Women's League. The following women have held the office of secretary:

- Sally Mugabe (1978)
- Joice Mujuru (c. 1981–1988)
- Tsungirirai Hungwe (c. 1990s)
- Thenjiwe Lesabe (1994–2004)
- Oppah Muchinguri (until 2014)
- Grace Mugabe (6 December 2014 – December 2017)
- Mabel Chinomona (December 2017 – present)
