= Andrew Gutti =

Ugandan military officer

Lieutenant General Andrew Gutti
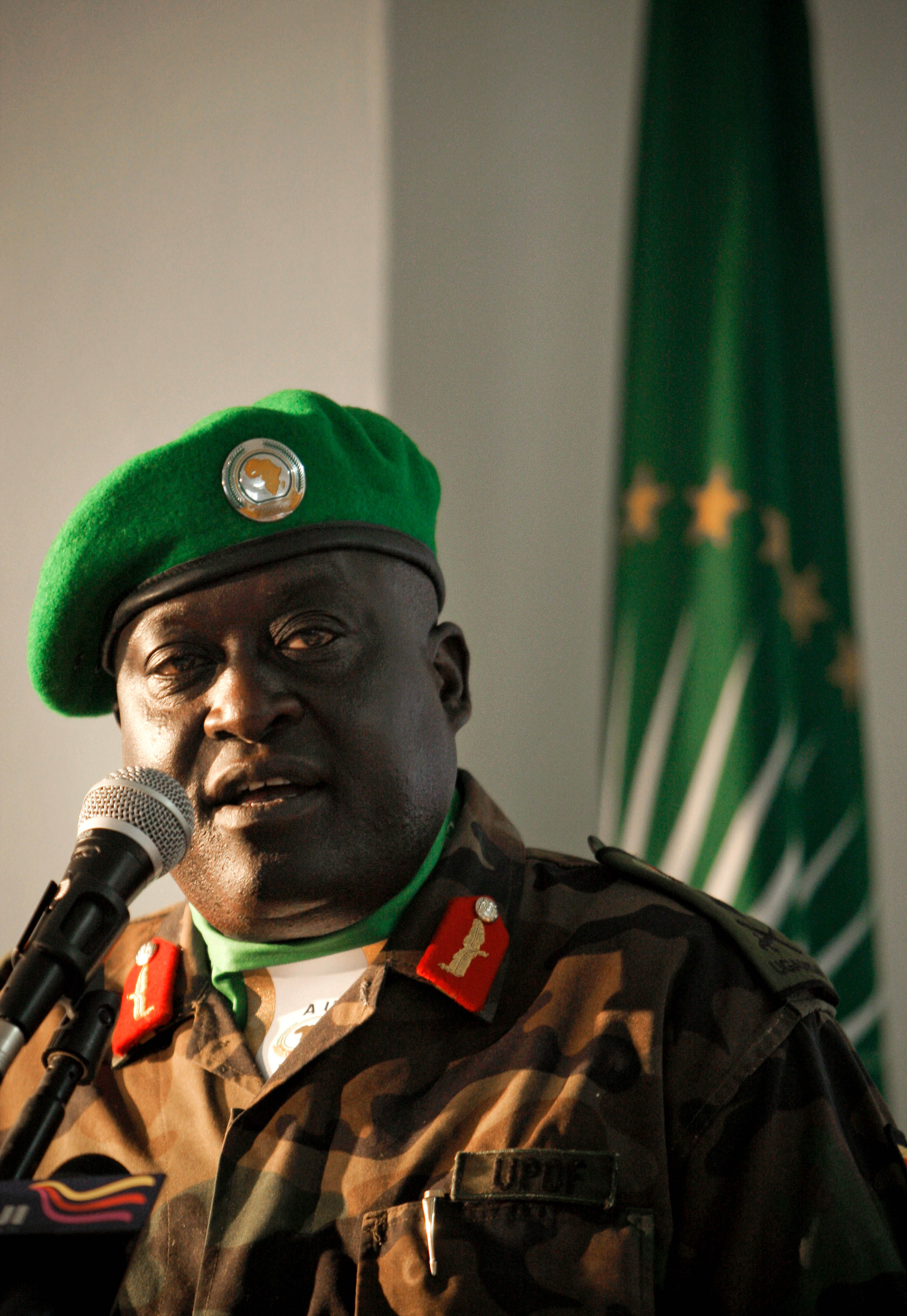
- New AMISOM Force commander frontline tour & handover, photo by Stuart Price
- Born: Moroto District, Uganda
- Citizenship: Uganda
- Occupation: Military officer
- Years active: 1986–present

Lieutenant General Andrew Gutti is a Ugandan military officer. He was the chairman of the general court martial of the Uganda People's Defence Force until 3 August 2022, when he handed over office to Brigadier General Robert Freeman Mugabe. Gutti was appointed to that position in May 2016, replacing the late Major General Levi Karuhanga.

== Military career ==
Between May 2012 and December 2013, Gutti was the commander of the African Union Mission to Somalia (AMISOM) based in Mogadishu, Somalia. For his service in Somalia, he was awarded the United States military service medal. Before his deployment to Somalia, he was the commandant of the Uganda Senior Command and Staff College at Kimaka in the Eastern Region of Uganda. He served in this role between 2007 and 2011, having served as the deputy to the commanding officer of the college, before that.

Other assignments in the UPDF include as the chief of training in the UPDF, a position he served in between 2004 and 2005, at the rank of brigadier, following his promotion from the rank of colonel in 2014. Before that, he served as the commander of the 3rd infantry Division.

In 2005, Gutti served as a member of the Parliament of Uganda, representing the UPDF, replacing Brigadier Henry Tumukunde. He was promoted from brigadier to major general, in February 2008, serving at that rank until March 2012, when he was promoted to lieutenant general, immediately prior to his deployment to Somalia.

== Senior Command and Staff College ==
Gutti served from 2011 until 2012 as commandant of the Uganda Senior Command and Staff College located in Kimaka, in the city of Jinja, in the Eastern Region of Uganda.

== As chairman of general court martial ==
Gutti's first term as chairman of the court martial lasted from 17 May 2016 until 16 May 2018. On 3 July 2018, the president of Uganda and commander-in-chief of the UPDF reappointed General Gutti to a second two-year term as the chairman of the UPDF general court martial.

In June 2022, Gutti's third consecutive two-year term as chairman of the UPDF court martial came to an end. On 12 July 2022, Brigadier Robert Freeman Mugabe was named to replace him.
