= Prince (cigarette) =

Danish cigarette brand

- Product type: Cigarette
- Current owner: British American Tobacco
- Produced by: House of Prince
- Country: Denmark
- Introduced: 1957; 69 years ago
- Markets: See Markets
- Previous owners: Scandinavian Tobacco Company
- Tagline: "Jeg er også gået over til Prince" ("I have also gone over to Prince")

Prince is a Danish brand of cigarettes, owned by multinational British American Tobacco, and produced by House of Prince, which until 2008 was a subsidiary of the Scandinavian Tobacco Company.

== History ==
Prince was introduced in 1957 on the Danish market by Chr. Augustine's Fabrikker as a 'counterpart' to the first filter cigarette in this country, "All-Over", as R. Færch's Factories released four years earlier. For decades, Prince was an unquestioned market leader, but in recent years the position has been challenged by brands like "LA", which have taken significant market shares. In 2002 Prince saw 48.1% of the Danish cigarette market, while it accounted for only 26.7% of sales five years later.

Right from the beginning, Prince marketed under the slogan "Jeg er også gået over til Prince" ("I have also gone over to Prince"). First, the models were anonymous, but already from the 1960s there were known faces that contributed. In the 1990s, there was, among other people, the photomodel Tina Kjær. Denmark, like other EU countries, banned the advertising of tobacco from 2002 onward. In Norway and Sweden, the brand became known for its aggressive marketing, where Norwegian and Swedish celebrities stood up and said they "had also gone over to Prince". Rolv Wesenlund, Roald Øyen, Henki Kolstad, Lollo Schanke, Kari Simonsen and Elisabeth Granneman were some of the celebrities who did so.

In 1961 Prince was launched on the Swedish market and in 1967 in Norway, where today it has a market share of approx. 42%, and where Prince Rounded Taste is the country's best-selling cigarette. The market share of Prince is approx. 34%. The northern part of West Germany was taken in 1972 and the rest of Germany in 1986. Today, Prince cigarettes are available in more than 40 countries in the world.

In a study in 1977, 28 mg of tar and 2.0 mg of nicotine were found in each Prince cigarette. This was the fourth highest content of both substances in the test that covered 28 cigarette brands that were available in the Norwegian market. In 1987, the tar content of Prince was reduced to 20 mg and the nicotine content to 1.7 mg per cigarette.

== Controversy ==
In 2000, it was reported that counterfeit Prince cigarettes were smuggled into Denmark. "Consumers have found that it tastes terrible" says Director Anders Friis, adding that the false cigarettes were probably produced in Eastern Europe and, in some cases, perhaps in China. The Copenhagen police investigated a case of 2.5 million smuggled cigarettes, revealed at the German-Danish border, stored in a Russian lorry officially loaded with charcoal. The idea was that the cigarettes would be handed over to a man at the Bella Center in Copenhagen, showed the investigation. A 56-year-old Danish man had been detained in custody. The police believed that pirate production took place in several Eastern European countries, and Hasse Jakobsen said it was "an increasing problem".

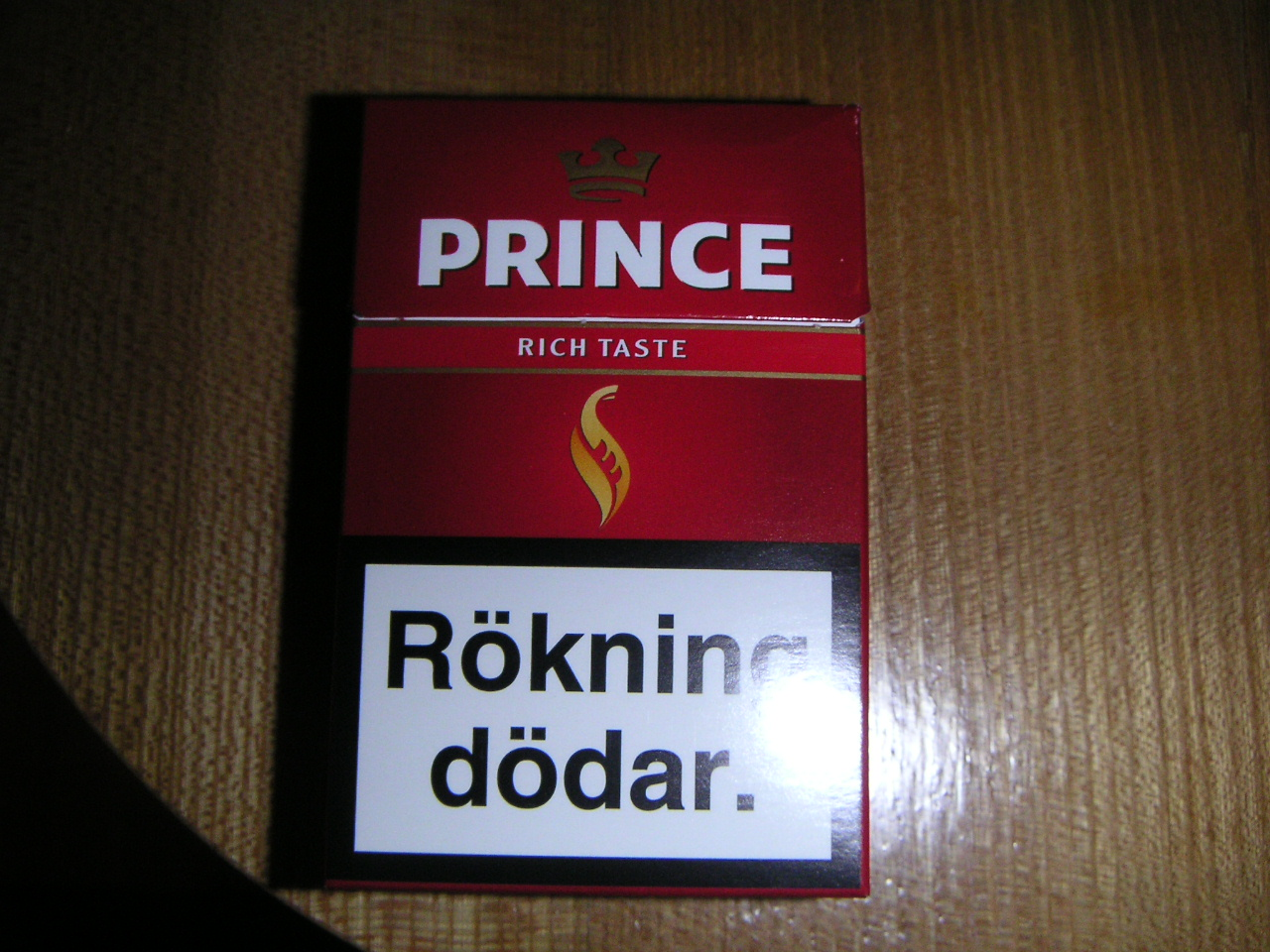
Pack of Prince cigarettes from Sweden

In 2003, it was also reported that illegal cigarettes were also smuggled into Sweden. The tobacco was legally imported from China or the Balkans, then distributed via ports in the Black Sea to buyers located elsewhere. The owners of the illegal cigarette factories bought the tobacco and, using old equipment (in some cases Danish machines from the 1950s), cigarettes were produced. They were printed with the branding of Prince or Marlboro, a case of trademark infringement. Direct transport from China also occurs.

In 2011, it was reported that BAT added additives into Prince cigarettes that made people addicted. A lawsuit followed, brought by ex-smoker Allan Lykke Jensen, which would settle whether BAT misled consumers by adding these additives, and by using false information from their own smoke testing devices.

In 2011, reports came out that the Scandinavian Tobacco Company may have used tobacco waste in the Prince cigarettes until the 1990s, and which was admitted the former director of Scandinavian Tobacco Company, Claus Bagger, in the Eastern District Court. He was interrogated as a representative of Scandinavian Tobacco Company, under the lawsuit brought by ex-smoker Allan Lykke Jensen for using different additives and techniques to mislead the smokers of nicotine and tar prescription in the Prince cigarettes. One of these methods, according to critics, was the addition of reconstituted tobacco waste.

In 2017, it was reported that illegal cartons of Prince cigarettes were openly sold online, often by criminal gangs. The main selling points were on Facebook and dba.dk. A carton typically cost between 250 and 300 Danish krone, making these cigarettes significantly cheaper than those in Danish stores where official Prince Red cartons cost 440 kr. The cigarettes are in any event illegal because no Danish tax is paid. But in a large part of the cigarettes there is something completely different from what was separated by the side of the package. Copyrights are typically produced at illegal factories in Eastern Europe and Asia. In Poland, the authorities often find illegal cigarettes, and in 2016, Polish police stormed illegal cigarette factories 30 times. Also at the Polish borders, 739 million cigarettes were confiscated in 2016. 186 times, the Polish authorities found Red Prince, which was produced in Germany for the Scandinavian market.

== Markets ==
Prince cigarettes are mainly sold in Denmark, but also are or were sold in Greenland, Norway, Sweden, Germany, France, Austria, Spain, Poland, Hungary, Czechoslovakia, Czech Republic, Greece, Latvia, Lithuania, Russia and India.

== Variants of the Prince brand ==
- Rich Taste (formerly Prince Full Flavour, introduced 1957)
- Rounded Taste (formerly Prince Lights, seni s.. senede)
- Rich Taste 100 (formerly Prince Full Flavour 100, introduced 1985)
- Rounded Taste 100 (formerly Prince Lights 100, introduced 1988)
- Menthol Taste (formerly Prince Lights Menthol, introduced 1990)
- Golden Taste (formerly Prince Ultra Lights, introduced 1990)
- Golden Taste 100 (formerly Prince Lights 100, introduced 1995)
- Smooth Taste (formerly Prince Extra Ultra, introduced 1999)
- Mellow Taste (formerly Prince Medium)
- Highland Taste: Introduced in 2006
- Indian Summer: Introduced in late 2007/early 2008
- First Cut: Introduced in late 2007/early 2008

== See also ==
- Tobacco smoking
