= Janet Banana =

First Lady of Zimbabwe (1980–1987)

- Canaan and Janet Banana

First Lady of Zimbabwe
- In role 18 April 1980 – 31 December 1987
- President: Canaan Banana
- Succeeded by: Sally Mugabe

Personal details
- Born: Janet Mbuyazwe; 1938 Matabeleland, Southern Rhodesia
- Died: 29 July 2021 (aged 82–83) Bulawayo, Zimbabwe
- Spouse: Canaan Banana (m. 1961; died 2003)
- Children: 4

Janet Banana (née Mbuyazwe; 1938 – 29 July 2021) was a Zimbabwean teacher who became First Lady of Zimbabwe. She was married to the country's first President, Canaan Banana, from 1961 until his death in 2003, and she served as the first First Lady of Zimbabwe from 1980 until 1987. In 2000, she sought asylum in the United Kingdom, where she became a citizen and remained until returning to Zimbabwe in 2019.

== Biography ==
=== Early life ===
Janet Mbuyazwe was born in 1938 into a family of farmers in the southern Matabeleland region of Zimbabwe during the years that it was a part of the Crown colony of Southern Rhodesia. When she became an adult, she chose to become a teacher and it was during this career that she first met Canaan Banana, who was also a teacher at the time. They married in 1961 and had four children. Her husband later left teaching to attend a theological college in order to become a minister in the Methodist church and the family moved several times to different churches for Canaan to provide religious service. However, when the Rhodesian independence movement began political action, Banana's husband decided to join the political sector as well and the United African National Council. But government arrests of UANC members led to the Banana family fleeing the country and not returning to the newly formed Rhodesia until 1975 while the Rhodesian Bush War was still ongoing.

=== Time as First Lady ===
Canaan Banana became President of Zimbabwe in 1980 and Janet became First Lady of Zimbabwe. She found the position exciting, both for her role in building the future of the country and for the position among international elite she now occupied, invited to attend events like the wedding of Prince Charles and Lady Diana Spencer. But it was also lonely, and she missed her family and familiar food, in a State House still staffed by employees hired to cook British food for Ian Smith. As First Lady and afterwards, she acted as an outspoken promoter of women's rights and racial integration in Zimbabwe. A conference for women hosted by the Methodist church in Bulawayo in 1987 had Banana speaking out on the segregated nature of the Methodist church in the country, including how that every women's organization had two branches largely divided on racial lines that she referred to as "mini-apartheids".

=== Later life ===
After seven years, Canaan Banana retired from the office of President following a constitutional amendment converting it from a ceremonial to an executive post, to be held by Robert Mugabe, hitherto Prime Minister. In the 1990s, her husband faced criminal charges for sodomy and Banana and her daughter sought political asylum in the United Kingdom in October 2000. She was awarded British citizenship in 2006, and took the oath of allegiance on 10 February 2006 at a ceremony in the London Borough of Haringey in front of the Mayor of Haringey. After Mugabe resigned in 2017, Banana made a statement hoping that his successor, Emmerson Mnangagwa, would have a "Damascene conversion, like St Paul" and turn away from the evils of Mugabe's government and the ethnic cleansing of the Gukurahundi. Despite her term as First Lady, Janet Banana did not receive a pension from either Mugabe or Mnangagwa. She later received her spousal pension after her return to Zimbabwe after 18 years in the United Kingdom. She returned to live in Bulawayo in 2019.

Janet Banana died on 29 July 2021 at Bulawayo's Mater Dei Hospital.
