= Stanley Goreraza =

Zimbabwean military officer and diplomat (died 2022)

Wing Commander Stanley Goreraza (died 5 June 2022) was an officer in the Air Force of Zimbabwe who served as defence attaché at the Zimbabwean embassy in China.

Born in Rhodesia, Goreraza was formerly married to Grace Marufu, then secretary to and now the widow of Robert Mugabe. The couple had one child, a son, Russell Goreraza, who now manages his mother's extensive farm property, Gushungo Dairy Estate.

In 1995, the fact that Goreraza's wife Grace had had two children by Mugabe became public. In 1995 or 1996, Grace and Stanley Goreraza divorced and Grace married Robert Mugabe in 1996.

By 2000, Goreraza was studying in China and he was due to return to Zimbabwe in late 2000. The following January, Goreraza was appointed Zimbabwe's defence attaché to China. In 2001, Goreraza was hospitalized in China and visited by Robert and Grace Mugabe.

In 2006, Goreraza was honoured for his long service in the Air Force of Zimbabwe, receiving a bar to his long and exemplary service medal.

On 5 June 2022, Goreraza died of cancer.
