= Cynthia Munwangari =

Burundian fashion designer

- Born: September 8, 1990 (age 35); Bujumbura, Burundi
- Occupation: Fashion designer
- Years active: 2010 — present
- Known for: Fashion
- Title: Director & Founder; Bujumbura Fashion Week

Cynthia Munwangari is a Burundian fashion designer, fashionista and businesswoman. She is the founder and current director of Bujumbura Fashion Week, held annually in Bujumbura (the country's largest city).

== Background and education ==
She was born on 8 September 1990, in Bujumbura, the largest city and then-capital of Burundi. Her father is a Burundi citizen and her mother traces her ancestry to Rwanda. She is the third-born and has two brothers and one sister. She received all her education in Burundi.

== Career ==
Munwangari is the founder-owner of the "Cy’Mun Collection" clothing label. She is also a fashion model for her label. In July 2014, Cynthia Munwangari, at the age of 23 years organised the first Bujumbura Fashion Week, attended by 24 African designers, from 14 countries. The four-hour fashion parade included forty models and was attended by Pierre Nkurunziza, the president of Burundi.

== Controversy ==
On the evening of Saturday 12 November 2016, one Kenneth Watmond Akena, employed as a community development officer in Aruu North County, Pader District, in Northern Uganda, while driving an automobile, collided with another vehicle in which Cynthia Munwangari was a passenger. The driver of the other vehicle was one Mathew Kanyamunyu, a Ugandan businessman and the boyfriend of Munwangari. The incident occurred in the Lugogo neighborhood of Kampala, Uganda's capital and largest city.

Later that evening Kanyamunyu and Munnwangari showed up at Norvik Hospital in the central business district of the city with Akena, who was bleeding from gunshot wounds to the abdomen. The Ugandan authorities were not satisfied with the explanations given by the couple regarding how Akena sustained his injuries, so they detained both. When Akena died the next day; both were charged with his murder.

In March 2017 Cynthia Munwangari and a brother of her boyfriend were granted bail but the boyfriend remained behind bars. As of August 2017, the trial continues, with Cynthia Munwangari out on bail and her boyfriend Matthew Kayamunyu incarcerated.

== See also ==
- Judiciary of Uganda
- Sonia Mugabo
