= First Lady of Zimbabwe =

Wife of the president of Zimbabwe

- Incumbent; Auxillia Mnangagwa since 24 November 2017
- Term length: Varies by marriage to the President
- Inaugural holder: Janet Banana
- Formation: 18 April 1980

First Lady of Zimbabwe is the title held by the wife of the president of Zimbabwe.

The current office holder is the wife of President Emmerson Mnangagwa, Auxillia C. Mnangagwa. Mnangagwa also held the parliamentary seat of Chirumanzu-Zibagwe until 30 July 2018 Mnangagwa did not contest her seat during the 2018 general election.

== First Ladies of Zimbabwe and its antecedents ==
=== Wives of the prime minister of Southern Rhodesia ===
Name	Start of term	End of term	Prime Minister
Gertrude Mary Coghlan	1 October 1923	28 August 1927	Charles Coghlan
Marion Meikle Moffat	2 September 1927	5 July 1933	Howard Unwin Moffat
Helen Augusta Mitchell (Browne)	5 July 1933	12 September 1933	George Mitchell
Blanche Huggins	12 September 1933	7 February 1953	Godfrey Huggins
Grace Todd	7 September 1953	17 February 1958	Garfield Todd
Vacant	17 February 1958	17 December 1962	Edgar Whitehead
Barbara Field	17 December 1962	13 April 1964	Winston Field
Janet Smith	13 April 1964	11 November 1965	Ian Smith

=== Wife of the prime minister of Rhodesia ===
Name	Term start	Term end	Prime Minister
Janet Smith	11 November 1965	1 June 1979	Ian Smith

=== First Lady of Zimbabwe Rhodesia ===
Name	Term start	Term end	President
Maggie Muzorewa	1 June 1979	12 December 1979	Abel Muzorewa

=== First Ladies of Zimbabwe ===
Name	Term start	Term end	President
Janet Banana	18 April 1980	31 December 1987	Canaan Banana
Sally Hayfron	31 December 1987	27 January 1992 (her death)	Robert Mugabe
Vacant	27 January 1992	17 August 1996	Robert Mugabe
Grace Mugabe	17 August 1996	21 November 2017	Robert Mugabe
Auxillia Mnangagwa	24 November 2017	Incumbent	Emmerson Mnangagwa

== See also ==
- President of Zimbabwe
- President of Rhodesia
- Auxillia Mnangagwa
- Grace Mugabe
- Sally Hayfron
- Janet Banana
- Chirumanzu-Zibagwe (Constituency)
