= Robert Mugabe Jr. =

Zimbabwean sportsman, fashion designer, political campaigner (born 1992)

Robert Mugabe Jr
- Born: 2 April 1992 (age 34)
- Occupations: Basketball player; fashion label owner; political campaigner
- Political party: ZANU-PF
- Parents: Robert Mugabe; Grace Marufu Mugabe
- Relatives: Bona Mugabe and Bellarmine (siblings)

Robert Tinotenda Mugabe Jr. (born 2 April 1992) is a Zimbabwean basketball player, fashion label owner, political campaigner, and the son of former president Robert Mugabe and Grace Mugabe.

== Early life and education ==
Robert Tinotenda Mugabe Jr. was born on 2 April 1992 to former Zimbabwean president Robert Mugabe and former First Lady Grace Mugabe.

He studied in the United Arab Emirates.

== Career and politics ==
At the age of 25, Mugabe played for the Zimbabwe men's national basketball team. He was previously part of the nation's under-18 team.

Robert Mugabe, with his brother Chatunga, launched the xGx clothing label in Johannesburg, in December 2017. The brothers had previously launched Trip Life music-entertainment company. Mugabe is also a brand ambassador for the SVG fashion brand.

In 2022, Mugabe was a member of Emmerson Mnangagwa's political campaign team. He is a member of the ZANU-PF political party.

== Personal life ==
In May 2022, Mugabe was admitted to a Singapore hospital after a lung collapse from pneumothorax. In September of the same year, he was injured after crashing his Range Rover in the Eastern Highlands. In February 2023, Mugabe was arrested, facing allegations of property damage and assault of a police officer. The prosecution was paused soon after a court appearance in Harare.

Mugabe is noted for his lavish lifestyle. At times, he has lived in South Africa.

On 1 October 2025, Mugabe was arrested in Harare after driving the wrong way on a one-way street. He was discovered with cannabis, charged with drug offences, and fined.

== See also ==
- Mugabe family
