= Chatunga Bellarmine Mugabe =

Zimbabwean entrepreneur and son of Robert Mugabe

- Born: 1997 (age 28–29); Harare, Zimbabwe
- Occupation: Entrepreneur
- Parents: Robert Mugabe (father); Grace Mugabe (mother)

Chatunga Bellarmine Mugabe (born 1997) is a Zimbabwean entrepreneur and the youngest son of the late Robert Mugabe, the first prime minister and second president of Zimbabwe, and his second wife, Grace Mugabe. He is known for his lavish lifestyle, business interests in the entertainment sector, and high-profile legal proceedings in both Zimbabwe and South Africa.

== Early life and family ==
Chatunga was born in 1997 in Harare, Zimbabwe, during his father's presidency. He grew up at the family's "Blue Roof" residence in Borrowdale, Harare. He is the youngest of three children born to Robert and Grace Mugabe; his elder siblings are Bona and Robert Jr. He also has a half-brother, Russell Goreraza. Following the 2017 Zimbabwean coup d'état and the subsequent death of his father in 2019, Mugabe relocated primarily to Johannesburg, South Africa.

== Business career ==
Mugabe has been active in the South African and Zimbabwean entertainment industries. In 2017, Mugabe and his brother Robert Jr. launched Big Apple 6, a promotions and entertainment company based in Johannesburg. The venture was designed to manage event promotions and music collaborations across the region. He has been associated with luxury branding and streetwear initiatives, often utilizing his social media presence to promote high-end fashion and lifestyle brands.

== Legal issues ==
=== Zimbabwe (2025) ===
In 2025, Mugabe was arrested in Zimbabwe following a violent confrontation at a gold mining concession in Mazowe. He was charged with several counts of assault and was released on bail.

=== South Africa (2026) ===
In February 2026, Mugabe was arrested in Johannesburg following a shooting incident at his home at Hyde Park. A 23-year-old employed as a gardener was reportedly shot in the back and left in a critical condition. The gun has never been found despite attempts by the South African Police Service using sniffer dogs and draining the swimming pool at the property. Mugabe and his cousin Tobias Mugabe Matonhodze were accused of several offences including attempted murder, possession of an unlicensed firearm and ammunition, defeating the ends of justice by disposing of the gun, and violations of the Immigration Act. On March 11, 2026, Mugabe abandoned his bail application at the Alexandra Magistrate's Court. By late March 2026, his defence team indicated that plea negotiations with the National Prosecuting Authority were at an advanced stage.

In April 2026, Matonhodze pleaded guilty to four charges, including attempted murder, and was given a three-year prison sentence. He and Matonhodze had agreed to jointly pay the victim R400 000 in compensation. Mugabe was fined R400 000 in an unrelated case dating to 2023, for pointing a toy gun in a manner that suggested it was real, and R200 000 for breach of immigration law, after pleading guilty on both charges. The judge ordered him immediately deported to Zimbabwe.
