= Richard Jones (photojournalist) =

British photojournalist

Richard Jones is a British photojournalist, based in Hong Kong until 2012. In 2009 he was the victim of an assault by Grace Mugabe and her bodyguard.

Jones' work related to China's One-Child Policy has won numerous Human Rights Press Awards and a National Press Photographers Association Award. He won the Photojournalism category at the Photography Masters Cup International Color Awards in 2009. He was nominated and "Highly Commended" in the Foreign Reporter of the Year category at the UK Press Awards in 2011 for his reporting from China for the Mail on Sunday.

In 2012 Jones moved to the UK and pursued a career in the cultural sector, working for museums and galleries. In 2023 he was named as a finalist National Lottery Awards "Outstanding Individuals" in heritage for his work documenting the faces and testimonies of the Last Generations of Coalminers from Wales.
