= Sonia Mugabo =

Rwandan businesswoman

- Born: 5 May 1990 (age 36); Kigali, Rwanda
- Citizenship: Rwandan
- Education: Buena Vista University (Bachelor of Arts in Visual Communication and Graphic Design)
- Occupation: Fashion designer
- Years active: 2013 — present
- Known for: Fashion
- Title: Founder & CEO of Sonia Mugabo Fashions

Sonia Mugabo (born 5 May 1990) is a Rwandan businesswoman, fashion designer and fashionista. She is the founder and chief executive officer of the fashion label Sonia Mugabo, named after her.

== Background and education ==
She was born in Kigali, on May 5, 1990. In an interview with Forbes Africa in August 2015, Mugabo stated that she was four years old during the 1994 Rwandan Genocide against the Tutsi. She attended Green Hills Academy, an international pre-university institution of learning, in Rwanda.

She then received a scholarship to finish her high school education at Lake Forest Academy (LFA), a prestigious co-educational boarding and day high school (grades 9 to 12), located in Lake Forest, Illinois in the United States. She attended Buena Vista University, in Storm Lake, Iowa, United States, graduating with a Bachelor of Arts degree in Visual Communication and Graphic Design. While at university, she interned at Teen Vogue, in New York City, in 2011.

== Career ==
Mugabo is the founder and chief executive of the Sonia Mugabo fashion label, which is named after her. She established her fashion label in 2013, after graduation from university. The label made its first public showcase in October 2013 at the "Kigali Fashion Week". As of November 2017, the label develops two collections annually. Sonia Mugabo designs clothes for both men and women, using locally sourced material.

== Other considerations ==
In March 2017, Sonia Mugabo was named among "30 Most Promising Young Entrepreneurs In Africa 2017" by Forbes.com. As of March 2017, she owned two branded stores in Kigali. A reader of the English language daily newspaper, the New Times, wrote to the Editor in January 2017, noting that Mugabo is an inspiration to the youth. In September 2021 Sonia Mugabo was engaged with Known businessman Giego Twahirwa

== See also ==
- Cynthia Munwangari
