= Pacific Cigarette Company =

Zimbabwean tobacco company

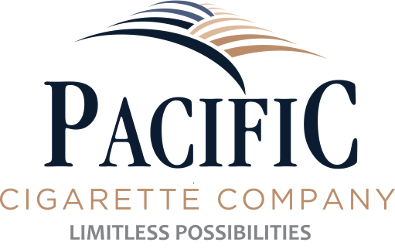
- Pacific Cigarette Company logo
- Formerly: Savanna Tobacco
- Type: Manufacturing
- Industry: Tobacco
- Founder: Adam Molai
- Headquarters: Harare, Zimbabwe
- Key people: Adam Molai, founder and CEO
- Products: Cigarettes
- Number of employees: 500+
- Website: www.pacificcigarette.com

Pacific Cigarette Company (formerly Savanna Tobacco) is a tobacco processing and cigarette manufacturing company, founded in 2002 by Adam Molai. It is the first cigarette manufacturer to be founded by a black African in Zimbabwe. Pacific Cigarette Company (PCC) is the manufacturer of Pacific, Branson, and Pegasus cigarette products.

== History ==
=== Founding ===
Pacific Cigarette Company was founded in 2002 as Savanna Tobacco by Zimbabwean entrepreneur Adam Molai and Nick Havercroft. Molai decided to found the company after observing that local tobacco was being harvested, manufactured into cigarettes in other countries, and then sold back to Zimbabweans.

The company started by purchasing and processing tobacco stems for export to other countries. After purchasing manufacturing equipment, Savanna launched its first cigarette product called Pacific Blue in 2004, becoming the first locally owned cigarette manufacturer in Zimbabwe.

=== Growth and name change ===
In 2009, Savanna Tobacco acquired a 75% stake in Burley Marketing Zimbabwe after buying out some shareholders in the company.

As of 2016, the company reported that 80% of its product was exported, with the South African market buying more of their products than the Zimbabwean market. The company also said that its market share was between 20 and 40%.

In 2017, the company changed its name to Pacific Cigarette Company (PCC). According to Molai, the company renamed itself because their customer base had already been referring to the company as "Pacific", the name of their flagship product line.

In 2018, PCC partnered with China Tobacco Shaanxi (CTSIC), a subsidiary of the China National Tobacco Company, in a manufacturing and licensing agreement for African markets.

As of 2022, PCC reported producing an average volume of 3 billion cigarette sticks a year.

In 2023, PCC was placed under voluntary business rescue after the government determined that the company owed millions of US dollars' worth of unpaid taxes. The company disputed the tax bill and blamed it on the country's foreign exchange surrender requirement on exports.

The company operates in Zimbabwe and exports to multiple countries in the region, including South Africa, Mozambique, Zambia, and Malawi.

PCC has provided various local sponsorships, including the Miss Zimbabwe contest, Oliver Mtukudzi, and local soccer teams.

== Products ==
PCC's flagship product line is Pacific, which comes in multiple flavors including Pacific Blue, Pacific Storm, Pacific Mist, and Pacific Breeze. PCC's additional product lines, Pegasus and Branson, also come in multiple flavors, including Branson Mint and Branson Flame, Pegasus Spring and Pegasus Sky. Pegasus Hong Ma was designed to have a "distinct Chinese flavour" to cater to Chinese customers.

PCC uses flow-wrap packaging in some of its products to allow customers to buy cigarettes in smaller packs of 2, 5, or 10 cigarettes. This was intended to reduce the sale of loose cigarettes which Molai has called "unhygienic and demeaning".

PCC products are typically cheaper than other cigarette brands sold in the region.

== Controversies ==
In November 2012, The Herald reported that most local cigarette companies, including Savanna Tobacco, had been recently robbed of millions of rand worth of product. The paper noted that British American Tobacco (BAT) had not reported any robberies. Additionally, a South African security firm called Forensic Security Services (FSS) was caught surveilling local tobacco companies, and several people were arrested. BAT's complicity was suspected but not proven, and they denied involvement. Later that month, President Robert Mugabe accused BAT of spying and hijacking Savanna Tobacco's trucks to "kill competition".

In 2014, Molai alleged that his competitors were undertaking industrial espionage and stifling Savanna's ability to increase exports. The following year, Vice President Emmerson Mnangagwa said he had opened an investigation into BAT's alleged attempts to undermine Savanna's growth. Several years later, a BBC Panorama investigation found evidence that BAT had, in fact, enlisted FSS to sabotage a Savanna Tobacco factory and that BAT had negotiated a bribe so that the government would release their people from jail.

PCC's cigarettes are smuggled into other countries, including South Africa and Botswana. According to a 2019 report by Atlantic Council, PCC's biggest market is in South Africa, where it accounts for the majority of trafficked cigarettes seized by authorities. A report by the Tobacco Institute of South Africa (which receives funds from BAT) found that PCC products comprise about 10% of the illegal cigarette market in South Africa. However, a more recent study by the University of Cape Town estimated that the company holds between 1 and 4% of the market share in South Africa and that about 78% of the company's cigarettes sold in South Africa are illegal.

Local media have reported that PCC was suspected of involvement in cigarette trafficking. A 2021 investigative report by Daily Maverick about goods trafficking alleged that PCC is part of "Mugabe’s patronage network" because founder Adam Molai is Mugabe's nephew-in-law. PCC has acknowledged that their cigarettes are smuggled but has denied responsibility and stated that "building brands with a Mugabe relationship has been the biggest challenge".

== Awards and recognition ==
- Monde Selection – Pacific Blue and Pacific Storm 2006 and 2011
