= Jan III Sobieski (cigarette) =

Polish cigarette brand

Jan III Sobieski is a Polish brand of cigarettes, currently owned and manufactured by British American Tobacco. The brand is a homage to the 17th-century Polish King Jan III Sobieski.

== History ==
The brand was introduced in March 1994. When British American Tobacco (BAT) began the manufacturing process, they became one of the key products of the foreign owned companies in Poland.

The brand gained a very large market share, leading to a rapid rise in Polish statistics concerning the manufacture of cigarettes. In 2000, the cigarettes were some of the most popular brands of tobacco products in Poland. Jan III Sobieski had 8% of the Polish cigarette market.

== Trade mark registration ==
In June 1995, BAT submitted an application for a registration of the trade mark "Jan III Sobieski", strictly specifying the set of words, graphics, as well as the font and colors that had to be trademarked. However, acquiring the trademark was not easy, because the Polish Patent Office ran relatively hard politics and rebellious record characters using popular names. In the case of King Jan III Sobieski, it was considered that its use as a brand of tobacco "would undermine the moral standards, respect for national traditions of the people of the late King and that was a depreciation values and authority figures". Only after the revision of the emergency the President UP the name King John III had been registered by the Office. All three versions are registered by the Polish Patent Office and protected from June 1995 onwards, contain the word "Jan III Sobieski".

== Legal controversy ==
In the mid 1990s, British American Tobacco launched the new brand of Polish cigarettes, which successfully went on the Polish market. However, four years after the founding of the brand of cigarettes to shops, there was a vodka brand bearing the same name, in which the logo on the label was very similar to what was on the packaging of tobacco products of BAT. Belonging to the French group Belvedere S.A. make strong wines repeated success with the reputation earned by cigarettes. At the end of the 1990s, Belvedere Distribution also introduced mineral water with the same name, and started an ad campaign of the new product. However, the lead role in the conflict between the leaders on the market of tobacco and vodka was at play. For company Belvedere in favour of works committees of Solidarność working in producing the drink "Jan III Sobieski" Sieradz Polmosie and Warsaw Koneserze. BAT in turn supported the Association of Manufacturers of branded products "Pro", for building, promotion and protection of the trade mark. The Polish Patent Office concluded, however, that using the same name for the two industries can cause confusion, and the brand "Jan III Sobieski" belongs to one owner.

== See also ==
- Tobacco smoking
