= Canaan Banana =

President of Zimbabwe from 1980 to 1987

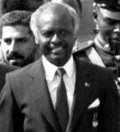
- Banana in 1986

1st President of Zimbabwe
- In office 18 April 1980 – 31 December 1987
- Prime Minister: Robert Mugabe
- Preceded by: Christopher Soames as Governor of Southern Rhodesia
- Succeeded by: Robert Mugabe

Personal details
- Born: 5 March 1936 Essexvale, Southern Rhodesia (present-day Zimbabwe)
- Died: 10 November 2003 (aged 67) London, England
- Party: ZANU
- Spouse: Janet Mbuyazwe (m. 1961)
- Children: 4
- Occupation: Minister; professor; politician

Canaan Sodindo Banana (5 March 1936 – 10 November 2003) was a Zimbabwean Methodist minister, theologian, and politician who served as the first President of Zimbabwe from 1980 to 1987. He was Zimbabwe's first head of state, a ceremonial president, after the Lancaster House Agreement that led to the country's independence. In 1987, he stepped down as president and was succeeded by Prime Minister Robert Mugabe, who became the country's executive president. In 1997, Banana was accused of being a homosexual, and after a highly publicised trial, was convicted of 11 counts of sodomy and "unnatural acts", serving six months in prison.

Banana was born in Essexvale (today Esigodini), a village in Matabeleland, Southern Rhodesia, to an Ndebele mother and a Mosotho father. He was educated at a mission school before studying at Epworth Theological College in Salisbury (now Harare). Ordained in 1962, he worked as a Methodist minister and a school administrator between 1963 and 1966. He was elected Chairman of the Bulawayo Council of Churches in 1969, holding that position until 1971. From 1971 to 1973, he worked for the All Africa Conference of Churches and was also a member of the Advisory Committee of the World Council of Churches. He became involved in anti-colonial politics, embracing black liberation theology and criticising the Rhodesian government under Ian Smith, which had declared the country independent under white-minority rule in 1965. He became vice-president of the African National Congress, but soon was forced to flee Rhodesia. He first went to Japan, before moving to Washington, D.C., United States, where he studied at Wesley Theological Seminary.

Upon returning to Rhodesia in 1975, he was imprisoned until 1976. That year, he accompanied Mugabe to the Geneva Conference, and in 1979, he attended the Lancaster House Conference in London that resulted in Zimbabwe's independence as a majority-rule democracy. In 1980, he became the country's first president, stepping down in 1987 so that Mugabe, who reformed the presidency from a ceremonial office into an executive one, could succeed him. Banana then worked as an Organisation of African Unity diplomat and also taught at the University of Zimbabwe. He also played a major role in arranging the union of the two main Zimbabwean revolutionary groups turned political parties, the ZAPU and his own ZANU, which merged in 1988 to form ZANU–PF, which is still the country's ruling party.

In 1997, Banana was arrested in Zimbabwe on charges of sodomy, following accusations made during the murder trial of his former bodyguard, who had killed another officer who had taunted him about being "Banana's homosexual wife". The charges related to allegations that Banana had misused his power while he was president to coerce numerous men into accepting sexual advances. Though he denied the accusations, he was found guilty of eleven charges of sodomy, attempted sodomy and indecent assault in 1998. He served six months in prison, and was also defrocked. He died of cancer in 2003, with sources varying on his place of death.

Banana was a controversial figure, especially after his criminal conviction. As president, he did not always command respect (a law was passed in 1982, banning Zimbabweans from joking about his surname). Nevertheless, he was held in esteem by some for his involvement in Zimbabwe's liberation struggle and later for his role in uniting ZANU and ZAPU, which ended the Gukurahundi massacres. After his death, Mugabe called him a "rare gift to the nation."

== Early life and career ==
Banana was born on 5 March 1936, near Essexvale (now Esigodini), Matabeleland, Southern Rhodesia. His mother was an Ndebele, and his father was an ethnic Basotho who had emigrated from Lesotho. He attended the local Mzinyati mission school, before completing his secondary education at Tegwani High School in Plumtree. He later studied at a teacher training institute before earning a diploma in theology at Epworth Theological College in Salisbury (today Harare). He was ordained a United Methodist minister in 1962. Between 1962 and 1966, he worked as a minister, visiting chaplain, and school administrator in Wankie (today Hwange) and Plumtree. In 1969, he was elected Chairman of the Bulawayo Council of Churches, an office he held until 1971. Between 1970 and 1973, he chaired the Southern Africa Content Group, part of the All Africa Conference of Churches' urban-industrial ministry. In that capacity, he worked with southern African churches as they adjusted to respond, theologically and practically, to urbanisation and industrialisation. During this time, he was also a member of the Advisory Committee of the World Council of Churches.

== Political activity ==
Our Father who art in the Ghetto,
Degraded is your name.
Thy servitude abounds,
Thy will is mocked,
As pie in the sky.
Teach us to demand,
Our share of gold.
Forgive us our docility,
As we demand our share of justice.
Lead us not into complicity,
Deliver us from our fears.
For ours is the sovereignty,
The power and the liberation,
For ever and ever,
Amen.

— Canaan Banana, from The Gospel According to the Ghetto

In the 1960s and 1970s, Banana became active in anti-colonial politics. From the pulpit, he began denouncing Rhodesia's white minority regime and preached a form of black liberation theology. He published a book entitled The Gospel According to the Ghetto, which included a personalised version of the Lord's Prayer that began "Our Father who art in the Ghetto." He embraced a socialist Christian theology, and declared that "when I see a guerrilla, I see Jesus Christ".

In 1971, the British government reached a deal with Rhodesian premier Ian Smith that provided for a transition to "majority rule" in exchange for an end to sanctions against Rhodesia. In response, Banana joined with fellow Methodist cleric Bishop Abel Muzorewa to form the United African National Council (UANC), which opposed the settlement. The proposed referendum was withdrawn and the UANC grew in prominence as a national political party. Initially, both Ndabaningi Sithole's Zimbabwe African National Union and Joshua Nkomo's Zimbabwe African People's Union loosely aligned themselves with the UANC. Because both ZANU and ZAPU participated with guerrilla forces in the Rhodesian Bush War, the UANC was the only legal black political party in Rhodesia, since it rejected violence. Banana served as the vice-president of the UANC from 1971 to 1973.

Although Banana and the UANC were more moderate than ZANU or ZAPU, they still faced persecution from the government. When several other UANC leaders were arrested, he fled from Rhodesia with his wife and children. At first, he went to Botswana, where he briefly stayed with a minister friend, Ben Hopkinson. Next, he went to Japan, where he studied at Kansai University in Osaka. Finally, he moved to the United States, settling in Washington, D.C., from 1973 to 1975. There, he served as the UANC representative to the United States and the United Nations, and studied at Wesley Theological Seminary from 1974 to 1975, obtained a Master of Theology.

== Presidency of Zimbabwe ==
When many Council members were arrested in the late 1960s, Banana and his family fled to the United States and did not return until 1975. Banana was arrested on his return but was released a year later, kept under house arrest, and then allowed to participate in Abel Muzorewa's plans for the country. However, he abandoned that effort and joined ZANU (led by Robert Mugabe), which was dedicated to overthrowing the Smith administration. Returning to Rhodesia in December 1976, Banana was arrested once more for his support of ZANU; upon the appointment of Lord Soames as Governor of Southern Rhodesia, he was released from prison.

Under the country's new constitution, Banana became the first president in 1980. In 1982, a law was passed forbidding citizens from making jokes about his name. In 1987, his largely ceremonial post was taken over by Mugabe, who made himself executive president. Banana then became a diplomat for the Organisation of African Unity and head of the religious department at the University of Zimbabwe. He played a large role in bringing the two major groups of independence fighters, ZANU and ZAPU, together to form the Zimbabwe African National Union – Patriotic Front, a merger that took place in 1988.

== Sodomy charges and imprisonment ==
In 1997, Banana was arrested in Zimbabwe on charges of sodomy, following accusations made during the murder trial of his former bodyguard, Jefta Dube. Dube, a policeman, had shot dead Patrick Mashiri, an officer who had taunted him about being "Banana's homosexual wife". The charges related to allegations from the state prosecutor that Banana had misused his power while he was president to coerce numerous men in positions of service (ranging from domestic staff to security guards, and even members of sports teams for whom he had acted as referee) into accepting sexual advances at State House. Banana was found guilty of eleven charges of sodomy, attempted sodomy and indecent assault in 1998. He denied all charges, saying that homosexuality is "deviant, abominable and wrong", and the allegations made against him were "pathological lies" intended to destroy his political career. Janet Banana later discussed her husband's alleged homosexuality and confirmed it, even though she considered the charges against him to be politically motivated.

He fled to South Africa whilst released on bail before he could be imprisoned, apparently believing Mugabe was planning his death. He returned to Zimbabwe in December 1998, after a meeting with Nelson Mandela, who convinced him to face the ruling. Banana was sentenced on 18 January 1999 to ten years in jail, nine years suspended, and was also defrocked. He actually served six months in an open prison before being released in January 2001. His wife sought political asylum in Britain in October 2000, under a pre-existing accord. His son Michael Thabo (died 17 November 2020) and Michael's wife Caroline Banana were the subject of a 2013 BBC documentary Britain on the Fiddle investigating welfare benefit fraud in the United Kingdom.

== Death ==
On 10 November 2003, Banana died of cancer in London according to a report delivered by the Zimbabwean High Commissioner. The Guardian, a London-based newspaper, said Banana had travelled to South Africa, where he eventually died, to receive appropriate treatment for his cancer. However, this assertion relies upon uncorroborated testimonial evidence. He was buried in Zimbabwe in late November 2003. President Robert Mugabe called him "a rare gift to the nation" in a radio address. Banana was buried without full honours that are traditionally reserved for former heads of state. He had also not received the full benefits of a former president, such as a state pension. The Politburo's Secretary for Information and Publicity, Nathan Shamuyarira, told state radio that "they (the politburo) could not afford Banana hero status as a matter of principle."

== Personal life ==
Banana married Janet Mbuyazwe in 1961.

Political offices
Preceded by New creation	President of Zimbabwe; 1980–1987	Succeeded by Robert Mugabe
