= Stella Ford Mugabo =

Rwandan politician

Stella Ford Mugabo (born 1962) is a Rwandan politician who has served as Minister of Cabinet Affairs since July 2013.

== Early life and education ==
Mugabo was born in 1962 in Uganda to Francis Ford Gashumba and Stella Mukamutara. She has a degree in education from Makerere University and a Master of Arts in Economics and Social Studies from the University of Manchester.

== Career ==
Mugabo worked as a public policy analyst for the office of the President of Uganda, and then as Academic Registrar at Kigali Institute of Science, Technology and Management. She was Executive Secretary of the Public Sector Capacity Building Secretariat from March 2010 until 2014. She was the chair of board of the Rwanda Institute of Administration and Management and a member of the board of Rwanda's Capacity Building Programme.

Mugabo was appointed Minister of Cabinet Affairs by President Paul Kagame in July 2013, replacing Protais Musoni.

== Personal life ==
Mugabo is married with five daughters. She is a Christian.
