= Robert Freeman Mugabe =

Ugandan general

Brigadier General Robert Freeman Mugabe
- Born: c. 1965 (age 60–61); Uganda
- Citizenship: Uganda
- Education: Uganda Military Academy
- Occupation: Military officer
- Years active: 1985–present
- Title: Commander of Ground-based Air Defence.

Brigadier General Robert Freeman Mugabe is a Ugandan military officer in the Uganda People's Defence Forces (UPDF). Effective 12 July 2022, he was the chairman of the UPDF General Court Martial, the highest court of military justice in the country to 26th September 2025. He cuurently serves as the Commander of Ground-based Air Defence at UPDF Air forces. Before that, he served as the adjutant general of Bombo Military Barracks, the headquarters of the UPDF Land Forces, located in Bombo, Uganda.

== Background ==
Mugabe is reported to have joined the National Resistance Army (NRA) in 1985. NRA transformed into what is the Uganda People's Defense Force today. He underwent officer cadet training at what was the Cadet Officer School, in Jinja under Tanzanian military instructors. Today, the Cadet Officer School is part of the Uganda Military Academy, in Kabamba, Uganda. He graduated in 1989 as a second lieutenant.

== Military career ==
Over the course of the past 30 years, Mugabe has served in several leadership positions in the UPDF and UPDF Air Force including as Air Defence Regiment Commander, Division Training Operations Officer and Division Administrative Officer. He also served as a member of the UPDF contingent to Somalia, as part of the AMISOM mission.

He was promoted from colonel to brigadier in April 2021 and has served as the adjutant general at the Bombo barracks since 2020. In 2022, he took over as chairman of the UPDF General Court Martial, from Lieutenant General Andrew Gutti, whose term expired in June 2022. Gutti retired from the UPDF on 1 September 2022.

Mugabe took over his new appointment on 1 August 2022, in the presence of General Wilson Mbasu Mbadi, the UPDF Chief of Defense Forces. He took the oath of office and assumed office the next day. In June 2024, he was appointed to a third consecutive term as the chairman of the GCM and was sworn into office by the Judge Advocate Colonel Richard Tukachungurwa.

Military offices
Preceded by Andrew Gutti; As Chairman of the UPDF General Court Martial	Chairman of the UPDF General Court Martial; 2022 - present	Succeeded by Incumbent; As Chairman of the UPDF General Court Martial
