= Haru Mutasa =

Zimbabwean journalist

- Born: Harugumi Mutasa; Zimbabwean
- Education: Degree in journalism (2004), Rhodes University
- Occupations: Journalist, news broadcaster
- Employer: Al Jazeera

Harugumi Mutasa is a Zimbabwean broadcast journalist. She is currently a journalist for Al Jazeera.

== Biography ==
Mutasa earned a Bachelor of Journalism degree from Rhodes University in 2004 and now works as a broadcast journalist for Al Jazeera English, covering news across Africa.

== Career ==
Early career

Mutasa began her career as a student interning during holiday vacations from varsity for the South African Broadcasting Corporation (SABC), CNN, Television New Zealand (TVNZ), Associated Press Television News (APTN) and the STAR Sports network.

Before joining Aljazeera – as a student reporter on vacation from Rhodes University in South Africa – while in Harare, Zimbabwe, Mutasa produced stories about her country for: CNN's Inside Africa, Television New Zealand (TVNZ) and APTN. She has been under the spotlight for challenging the Western media pertaining their reportage of Africa, particularly Zimbabwe. Mutasa underscored that Euporeans do not like to be challenged; in that regard, she urged media practitioners in Zimbabwe to deliberate and establish why Western countries promote such narratives.

Al Jazeera English for more than 20 years

She is a field-correspondent for the Southern Africa region, based in Harare, Zimbabwe. Previously, she worked in East Africa, based at the bureau in Nairobi. In addition to these regions, Mutasa has covered stories from across Africa.

Although known mainly as a news correspondent, Mutasa also hosts studio-based interview-programmes. In 2013, she hosted the One World Summit show, where pertinent issues around leadership were issues around millennial leadership were discussed, she was alongside Pakistani author and political commentator Fatima Bhutto.

== Awards ==
- 2007: Royal Television Society Awards:Finalist for the "Young Journalist of the Year" award.
