= Sally Mugabe =

Wife of Robert Mugabe (1931–1992)

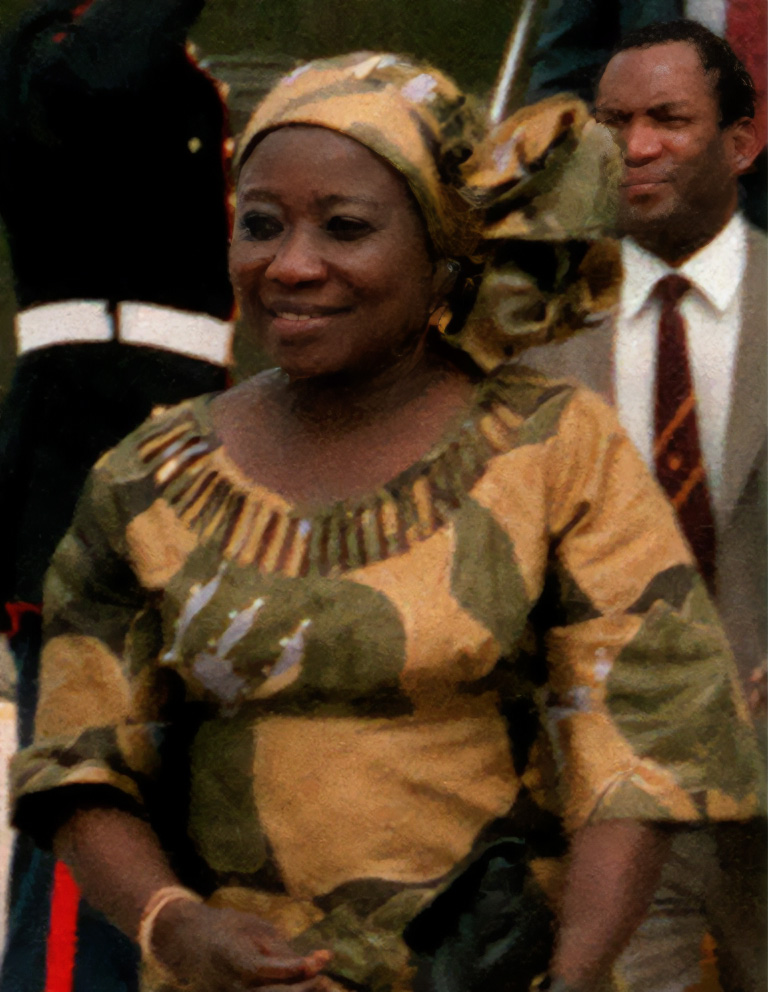
- Mugabe after a state visit to the United States in 1983

First Lady of Zimbabwe
- In role 31 December 1987 – 27 January 1992
- President: Robert Mugabe
- Preceded by: Janet Banana
- Succeeded by: Grace Mugabe (1996)

1st Secretary of the ZANU-PF Women’s league
- In office 1989–1992
- Preceded by: Position established
- Succeeded by: Joice Mujuru

Personal details
- Born: Sarah Francesca Hayfron; 6 June 1931 Gold Coast (now Ghana)
- Died: 27 January 1992 (aged 60) Harare, Zimbabwe
- Cause of death: Kidney failure
- Resting place: National Heroes' Acre, Harare, Zimbabwe
- Party: ZANU-PF
- Spouse: Robert Mugabe (m. 1961)
- Children: 1
- Occupation: Teacher; political activist

Sarah Francesca Mugabe (née Hayfron; 6 June 1931 – 27 January 1992) was the first wife of Robert Mugabe and the First Lady of Zimbabwe from 1987 until her death in 1992.

== Early life ==
Born Sarah Francesca Hayfron on 6 June 1931 in the Gold Coast (present-day Ghana), then a British colony. Sally and her twin sister, Esther were raised in a political family which was part of the growing nationalist politics in the colonial Gold Coast. Her maternal grandfather was Peter Awoonor-Renner, a Sierra Leone Creole lawyer and first leader of the Gold Coast bar. She went to Achimota School, then went on to university to study before qualifying as a teacher.

She met her future husband, Robert Mugabe, in the Gold Coast at Takoradi Teacher Training College where they were both teaching, and went with him to Southern Rhodesia, where they were married in April 1961 in Salisbury.

== Exile and family ==
A trained teacher who asserted her position as an independent political activist and campaigner, Hayfron demonstrated this activism as early as 1962 when she was active in mobilising African women to challenge the Southern Rhodesian constitution. She was charged with sedition and sentenced to five years imprisonment. Part of the sentence was suspended.

In 1967, Sally went into exile in London, where she studied and worked in a variety of jobs including as secretary to Margaret Feeny, first Director of the Africa Centre, Covent Garden, and Race Relations Clerk with the Runnymede Trust. She resided in Ealing, West London. Her stay in Britain was financed, at least in part, by the British Ariel Foundation. This was a charity founded in 1960. She spent the next eight years agitating and campaigning for the release of political detainees in Rhodesia, including her husband who had been arrested in 1964 and was to remain incarcerated for ten years. Their only son, Nhamodzenyika, who was born in 1963 during this period of detention and imprisonment, would succumb to a severe attack of malaria and die in Ghana in 1966. Mugabe was prevented from attending the burial of his son. Her father died in 1970.

The British Home Office attempted to deport her in 1970, but after her husband, still in prison, petitioned the British Prime Minister, Harold Wilson, and the Foreign and Commonwealth Office, she was given British residency. Her case for residency was supported by two British Government ministers in particular: Labour MP Maurice Foley, and the Conservative peer Lord Lothian.

With Robert Mugabe's release in 1975 and subsequent departure for Mozambique with Edgar Tekere, Sally rejoined her husband in Maputo. Here, she cast herself in the new role of a mother figure to the thousands of refugees created by the Rhodesian Bush War.

== Return to politics ==
In 1978, she was elected ZANU-PF Deputy Secretary for the Women's League.

In 1980, when ZANU-PF won Zimbabwe's independence elections, she was elevated to a new national role as wife of the first black Prime Minister of Zimbabwe. She officially became the First Lady of Zimbabwe in 1987 when her husband became the second President of Zimbabwe. She was elected Secretary General of the ZANU-PF Women's League at the Party's Congress of 1989.

She also founded the Zimbabwe Child Survival Movement. Sally Mugabe launched the Zimbabwe Women's Cooperative in the UK in 1986 and supported Akina Mama wa Afrika, a London-based African women's organisation focusing on development and women's issues in Africa and the United Kingdom.

== Death and remembrance ==
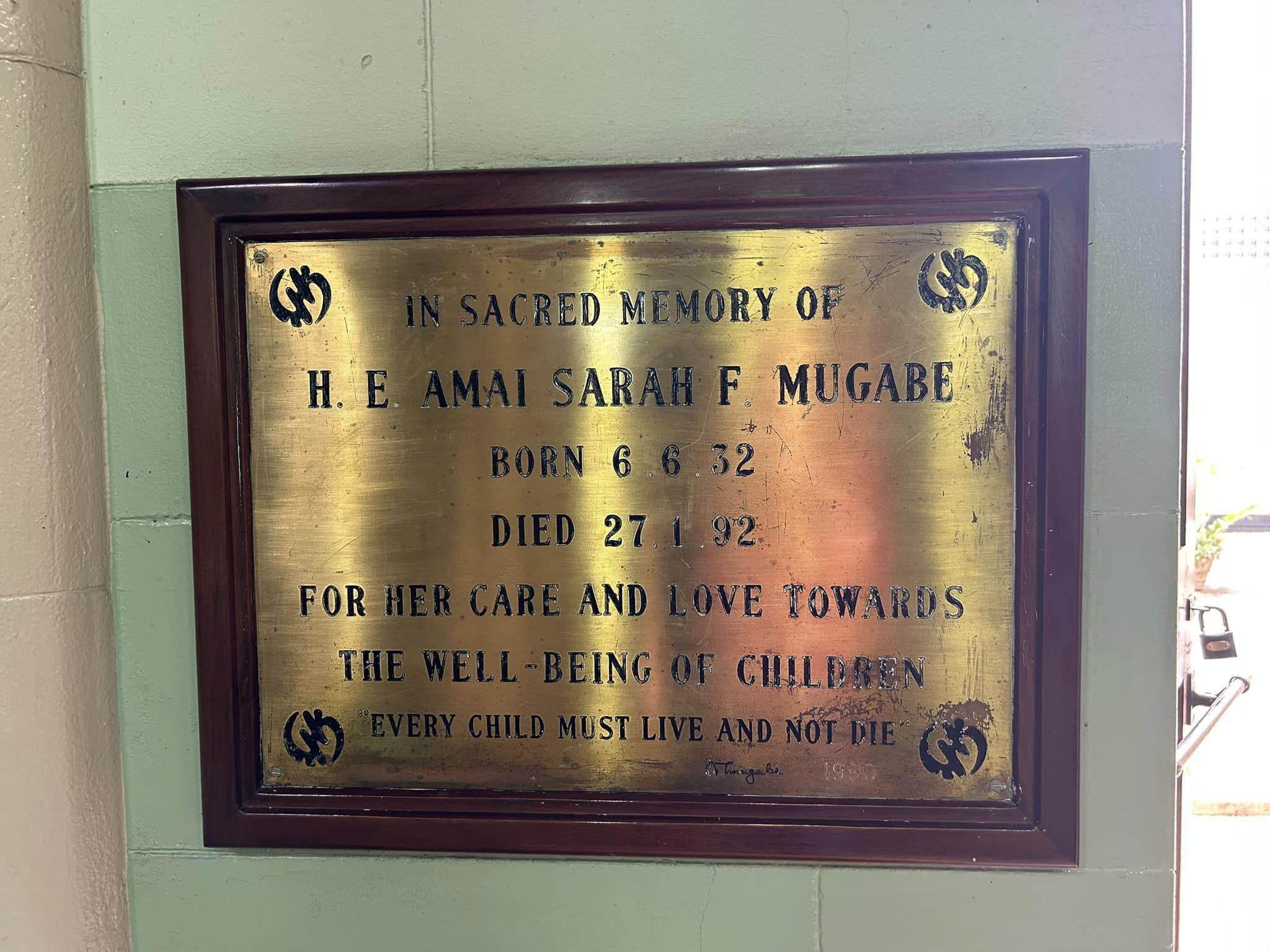
Memorial plaque at the Catholic Cathedral in Harare

Sally Mugabe died on 27 January 1992 of kidney failure. Upon her death, she was interred at the National Heroes' Acre in Harare, Zimbabwe. In 2002, to mark the 10th anniversary of her death, Zimbabwe issued a set of five postage stamps of a common design using two different photographs, each photograph appearing on two of the denominations. She is remembered fondly with love and affection, as she is still considered the founding mother of the nation of Zimbabwe.
