= Grace Mugabe =

Former First lady of Zimbabwe; wife of Robert Mugabe

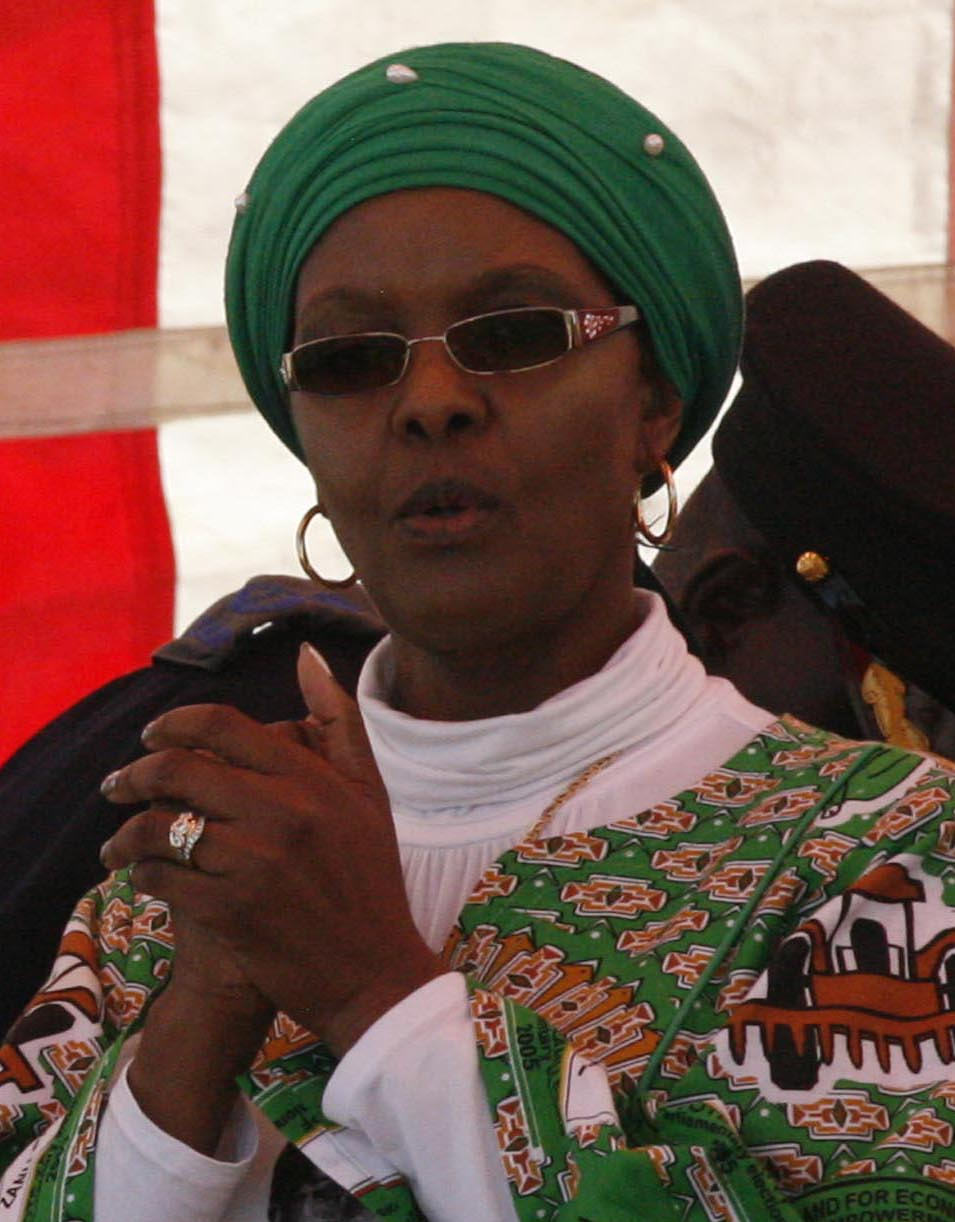
- Mugabe in 2013

First Lady of Zimbabwe
- In role 17 August 1996 – 21 November 2017
- President: Robert Mugabe
- Preceded by: Sally Mugabe
- Succeeded by: Auxillia Mnangagwa

6th Secretary of the ZANU–PF Women's League
- In office 6 December 2014 – December 2017
- Preceded by: Oppah Muchinguri
- Succeeded by: Mabel Chinomona

Personal details
- Born: Grace Ntombizodwa Marufu; 23 July 1965 (age 61) Benoni, South Africa
- Party: ZANU-PF (2014–2017, expelled)
- Spouses: Stanley Goreraza (m. 1983; div. 1996); Robert Mugabe (m. 1996; died 2019)
- Children: 4, including Bona, Robert Mugabe Jr. and Bellarmine
- Education: Renmin University of China; University of Zimbabwe (disputed)
- Occupation: Entrepreneur; politician
- Nickname: Gucci Grace

Grace Ntombizodwa Mugabe (formerly Goreraza, née Marufu; born 23 July 1965) is a Zimbabwean entrepreneur, politician and the widow of the late President Robert Mugabe. She served as the First Lady of Zimbabwe from 1996 until her husband's resignation in November 2017, a week after he was ousted from power in the 2017 Zimbabwean coup d'état. Starting as a secretary to Mugabe, she rose in the ranks of the ruling ZANU–PF party to become the head of its Women's League and a key figure in the Generation 40 faction. At the same time, she gained a reputation for privilege and extravagance during a period of economic turmoil in the country. She was given the nickname Gucci Grace due to her extravagance. She was expelled from the party, with other G40 members, during the 2017 coup.

Mugabe was cited as one of the Top 100 most influential Africans by New African magazine in 2014.

== Personal life ==
Grace Ntombizodwa was born in Benoni, South Africa to migrant parents as the fourth of five children in the family. In 1970, she moved to Rhodesia, to live with her mother, Idah Marufu in Chivhu while her father stayed and worked in South Africa to support his family. She attended primary school in Chivhu and then the Kriste Mambo secondary school in Manicaland.

She married air force pilot Stanley Goreraza and they had a son, Russell Goreraza, born in 1984 when Grace was 19 years old.

Whilst working as secretary to the president, Robert Mugabe, she became his mistress at a time when she was still married to Stanley Goreraza – and had two children, Bona born in 1988, named after Mugabe's mother, and Robert Peter Jr.

After the death of Mugabe's first wife, Sally Hayfron, the couple were married in an extravagant Catholic mass titled the "Wedding of the Century" by the Zimbabwe press. At the time of their marriage, Grace Marufu was 31 and Robert Mugabe was 72 years old.

Their second child, Robert Mugabe Jr., was born in the early 1990s. In 1997, she gave birth to the couple's third child, Chatunga Berlamine Mugabe.

Grace Mugabe enrolled as an undergraduate student at the School of Liberal Arts, Renmin University in China in 2007, studying the Chinese language. She graduated in 2011. She admitted, however, that she was not proficient in Chinese after finishing the degree. Her mother Idah Marufu died on 31 August 2018, aged 84.

== ZANU-PF ==
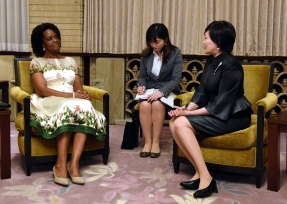
With Akie Abe (in Japan, 28 March 2016)

In late 2014, Grace Mugabe was critical of Vice-President Joice Mujuru, who allegedly plotted against her husband, President Mugabe. Ultimately, the accusations against Mujuru resulted in her elimination as a candidate to succeed Mugabe and her effectively becoming an outcast within ZANU-PF by the time it held a party congress in December 2014.

Meanwhile, Grace Mugabe's political prominence increased. She was nominated as head of the ZANU–PF Women's League, and delegates to the party congress approved her nomination by acclamation on 6 December 2014. In becoming head of the women's league, she also became a member of the ZANU-PF Politburo. Since 2016, the first lady's involvement in ZANU-PF in-house politics has seen rumours pointing out that she is fronting one of the party's secretive factions, the G40 (Generation 40). The other faction, Lacoste, assumingly led by the Vice-President Emmerson Mnangagwa. Factionalism in ZANU-PF at the time centered mainly on the Mugabe succession question.

The feud between Grace Mugabe and Mnangagwa reached a tipping point in late September 2017, with both parties pointing fingers to each other on ZANU-PF public gatherings. While addressing an audience at Mahofa's memorial service, Mnangagwa claimed he was poisoned at a ZANU-PF Youth Interface rally in Gwanda. Soon after Mnangagwa's remarks, President Robert Mugabe called a shock cabinet reshuffle in what many believe to be power-shifting exercise. Mnangagwa, like fellow suspected allies, lost the justice ministry. October 2017 marked Grace Mugabe's peak political influence in ZANU-PF.

In November 2017, Grace was instrumental in the firing of the then Vice-President Emmerson Mnangagwa, after reprimanding him for causing divisions in ZANU-PF. Shortly thereafter, Grace expressed her intentions of taking up the Vice-Presidency post. The country was in heightened tension and soon after that while Emmerson Mnangagwa had sought refuge outside of Zimbabwe, the military took over in a bloodless coup under General Constantino Chiwenga. Grace Mugabe was notably invisible at this time with various reports of her whereabouts. On 19 November, Grace Mugabe and 20 of her associates were expelled from the ZANU-PF. When Robert Mugabe died on 6 September 2019, both Mugabes were in Singapore.

== Sanctions ==
After observers from the European Union were barred from examining Zimbabwe's 2002 elections, the EU imposed sanctions on 20 members of the Zimbabwe leadership and then, in July, extended them to include Grace Mugabe and 51 others, banning them from travelling to participating countries and freezing any assets held there. In 2003, the United States instituted similar restrictions.

== Controversies ==
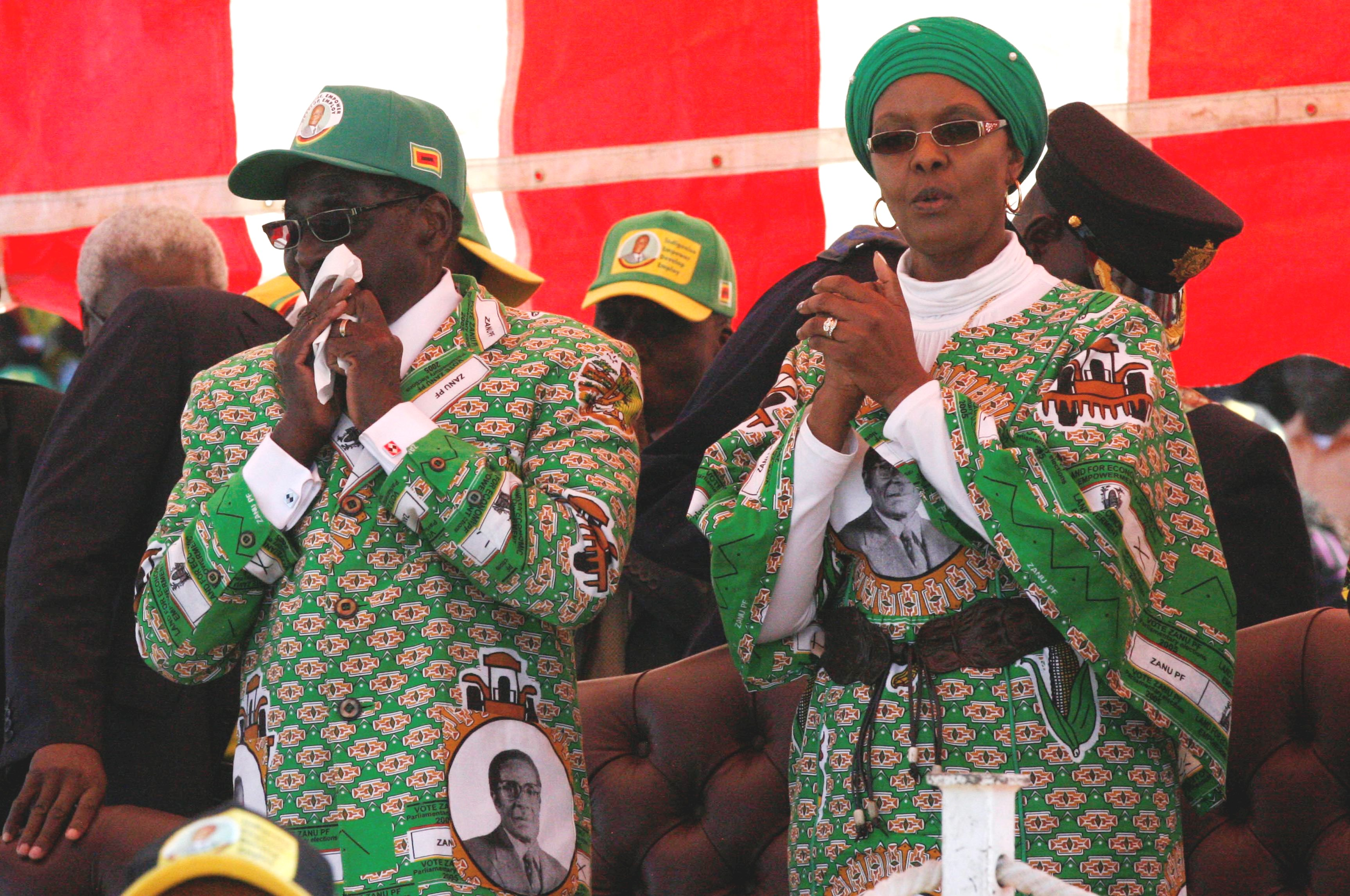
With Robert Mugabe on 4 August 2013

=== Real estate ===
During her tenure as first lady, Grace Mugabe oversaw the construction of two palaces. The first, commonly referred to as "Gracelands", was criticised for its extravagance. Grace Mugabe later explained that she had paid for it with her own personal savings. It was later sold to Muammar Gaddafi of Libya. The second was completed in 2007, costing around $50 million. The construction was funded by the ZANU-PF party to thank Robert Mugabe for his political service.

In 2002, Grace Mugabe toured farm properties in Zimbabwe, looking for a new location for herself and her family. She chose the Iron Mask Estate, which had been previously owned by farmers John and Eva Matthews.

The family owns property in Malaysia, and in early 2008, it was reported that Grace Mugabe hoped to move there with her children. The intention behind the move was to escape the stress of leadership and to address fears that the first family faces assassination. She also acquired property holdings in Hong Kong, including a diamond cutting business and a property at Tai Po, New Territories. IOL news speculated that this property acquisition was intended as both a weekend getaway for their daughter, Bona, who was studying at the University of Hong Kong under an assumed name, and that she and her husband expect to escape to China should they be ousted from power in Zimbabwe. Legislators of the pro-democracy movement urged the Hong Kong government to study whether to follow international practice in barring certain foreign politicians as many people might be looking at buying properties, investments, or education in Hong Kong. Lee Wing-tat said Beijing should be making the decision since this was a foreign affair. Spokesperson Jiang Yu from the Ministry of Foreign Affairs of the People's Republic of China said she was not aware of the Mugabes' alleged house purchase in Hong Kong and would not comment further. A professor at the University of Hong Kong said Beijing was trying to stay out of the controversy. The Beijing central government dismissed the concerns, adding that Falun Gong members were allowed to buy properties in Hong Kong.

It was reported in 2015 that Zimbabwe was involved in a legal dispute over the ownership of the property in Tai Po in which Bona Mugabe had stayed while a student in Hong Kong. The property had been acquired in June 2008 through a company controlled by Taiwanese-born South African businessman Hsieh Ping-sung for HK$40 million ($5.14 million) and transferred into his own name in 2010. The Mugabes allege that the villa belonged to the Zimbabwean government, while Hsieh, who was once a Mugabe confidant, claims there was no question that the house belonged to him.

=== Diamond trade allegations and lawsuit ===
In December 2010 U.S. diplomatic cables released by WikiLeaks brought up again earlier allegations that high-ranking Zimbabwean government officials and well-connected elites, including Mugabe's wife Grace, are generating millions of dollars in personal income by hiring teams of diggers to hand-extract diamonds from the Chiadzwa mine in eastern Zimbabwe. Grace Mugabe was reported in 2010 to be suing a Zimbabwean newspaper over its reporting of claims released by WikiLeaks that she had made "tremendous profits" from the country's diamond mines. The president's wife is demanding $15m (£9.6m) from the Standard newspaper.

=== Shopping ===
Grace Mugabe is known for her lavish lifestyle, and Western media has nicknamed her "Gucci Grace". The Daily Telegraph called her "notorious at home for her profligacy" in the coverage of a 2003 trip to Paris, during which she was reported as spending £75,000 in a short shopping spree; and in the years leading up to 2004 withdrew over £5 million from the Central Bank of Zimbabwe. When Grace Mugabe was included in the 2002 sanctions, one EU parliamentarian said that the ban would "stop Grace Mugabe going on her shopping trips in the face of catastrophic poverty blighting the people of Zimbabwe". She faces similar sanctions in the United States.

=== Education ===
Controversy ensued when Grace Mugabe was given a doctoral degree in sociology in September 2014 from the University of Zimbabwe two months after entering the programme. She was awarded the degree by her husband and University Chancellor Robert Mugabe. Her doctoral thesis was not published in the university archive along with other graduates and she has faced calls to return her PhD. The awarding of the degree caused a backlash in the Zimbabwean academic community, with some commenting that this could harm the reputation of the university. On 22 January 2018, the University website published Grace Mugabe's PhD thesis (without a signature page of a doctoral committee). Levi Nyagura, the vice chancellor of the University of Zimbabwe, was arrested in 2018 by the Zimbabwe Anti-Corruption Commission to be charged with abuse of office following an investigation into the PhD.

=== Various assaults ===
Mugabe's reputation for violence and hot temper earned her the nickname of "Dis-Grace" in her homeland. There have also been incidents abroad: The Times reported on 18 January 2009 that, while on a shopping trip in Hong Kong where her daughter Bona Mugabe was a university student, Mugabe ordered her bodyguard to assault Sunday Times photographer Richard Jones outside her luxury hotel. She then joined in the attack, punching Jones repeatedly in the face while wearing diamond encrusted rings, causing him cuts and abrasions. She was subsequently granted immunity from prosecution 'under Chinese diplomatic rules' because of her status as Mugabe's wife.

In August 2017, while visiting South Africa to treat an ankle injury, Grace is said to have assaulted a 20-year-old model, Gabriella Engels, and two friends, who were in the company of her two younger sons, Robert Jr. and Chatunga, at a hotel in Sandton, Johannesburg. It is alleged that Grace hit the women and her sons, with an extension cord, causing various injuries including a deep gash on Engels' forehead. This was after accusing the women of living with her sons. After charges were laid by Engels for "assault with intent to cause grievous bodily harm", Grace was due to appear at a Johannesburg court on 15 August 2017, but failed to do so; she was subsequently granted diplomatic immunity. After President Robert Mugabe got deposed by Emmerson Mnangagwa, Gabriella Engels posted a tweet vowing revenge on Grace Mugabe. On 30 July 2018, the South African High Court stripped Grace of her diplomatic immunity and allowed the case involving her assault against Engels to proceed.

=== Ivory smuggling ===
A police spokeswoman stated on 26 March 2018 that they were investigating a case of alleged ivory smuggling linked to Grace. The spokesman for Zimbabwe's national parks and wildlife agency stated that Mugabe and senior members of her staff had forced parks' officials to sign export permits for ivory pieces during her husband's presidency.

=== Mazowe Dam ===
In 2017, Grace's Mazowe Citrus Estate took control of 60 per cent of the Mazowe Dam. On 24 August 2018. Zimbabwe President Emmerson Mnangagwa issued a provision ordering the Mugabe family to vacate the Dam and return their share to the Environment, Water, and Climate Ministry.
