= Kutama, Zimbabwe =

Town in Zimbabwe

Coordinates: 17°48′24″S 30°23′10″E

Kutama is a town in the Zvimba District of Mashonaland West Province in Zimbabwe. The town is home to the Kutama College and was the birthplace of Zimbabwe's former President Robert Mugabe. Mugabe was buried in the courtyard of his rural homestead in Kutama on 28 September 2019.

== History ==
Former President of Zimbabwe Robert Mugabe was born in Kutama on 21 February 1924. He was also later buried at his home in Kutama on 28 September 2019.
