= Africa-Europe Summit =

Triennial meeting of African and European heads of state

The African Union–European Union Summit (also known as the Africa–Europe Summit) is a triennial meeting of heads of state and government from the member states of the African Union (AU) and the European Union (EU).

== History ==
The institutional partnership between Africa and Europe was formally established in April 2000 during the inaugural Africa-EU Summit held in Cairo, Egypt. At this meeting, leaders adopted the Cairo Declaration, framing a regular dialogue to address geopolitical, economic, and social ties. After the inaugural summit, tensions surrounding human rights, notably involving Zimbabwean President Robert Mugabe, resulted in several delays in subsequent summits. The dialogue successfully resumed at the second summit in Lisbon in 2007, with the adoption of the Joint Africa-EU Strategy.

== List of Summits ==
The summits traditionally alternate hosting venues between European and African nations:

No.	Date	City	Country	Host	Notes
1st	3–4 April 2000	Cairo	Egypt	Hosni Mubarak	Cairo Declaration.
2nd	8–9 December 2007	Lisbon	Portugal	José Sócrates	Adoption of the Joint Africa-EU Strategy (JAES).
3rd	29–30 November 2010	Tripoli	Libya	Muammar Gaddafi	
4th	2–3 April 2014	Brussels	Belgium	Herman Van Rompuy	
5th	29–30 November 2017	Abidjan	Ivory Coast	Alassane Ouattara	Focused on investing in youth and demographic shifts.
6th	17–18 February 2022	Brussels	Belgium	Charles Michel	Adopted the "Joint Vision for 2030"; emphasis on Global Gateway investments and post-COVID-19 recovery.
7th	24–25 November 2025	Luanda	Angola	João Lourenço	Marked the 25th anniversary of the formal partnership.

== See also ==
- African Union
- European Union
- Foreign relations of the European Union
