= 2007 Zimbabwean alleged coup attempt =

The Zimbabwean government claimed to have foiled a coup d'état attempt involving almost 400 soldiers and high-ranking members of the military that would have occurred on June 2 or June 15, 2007. The alleged leaders of the coup, all of whom were arrested, were retired army Captain Albert Matapo, Colonel Ben Ncube, Major General Engelbert Rugeje, and Air Vice Marshal Elson Moyo.

According to the government, the soldiers planned on forcibly removing President Robert Mugabe from office and asking Rural Housing Minister Emmerson Mnangagwa to form a government with the heads of the armed forces.

Some analysts have speculated that rival successors to Mugabe, such as former Zimbabwe African National Liberation Army leader Solomon Mujuru, were possibly trying to discredit Mnangagwa.

Treason charges were laid against Matapo and other civilians, but no treason trial ever took place, for lack of evidence. However seven men (including Matapo, but not Ncube, Rugeje or Moyo), who were allegedly only trying to form a new political party, were held in prison for seven years (and allegedly severely tortured beforehand) before being released in 2014, and subsequently founding their new party.

Ncube, Rugeje, and Moyo were all reported under house arrest in June 2007, but all remained in the army.

Mnangagwa remained in office, and eventually replaced Mugabe as President of Zimbabwe after a successful coup d'état in November 2017.

== May arrest ==
The Zimbabwean government claimed to have foiled an alleged coup d'état attempt involving almost 400 soldiers and high-ranking members of the military that would have occurred on June 2 or June 15, 2007. The alleged leaders of the coup, all of whom were arrested, were retired army Captain Albert Matapo, Spokesman for the Zimbabwe National Army Colonel Ben Ncube, Major General Engelbert Rugeje (Quartermaster at Army HQ), and Air Vice Marshal Elson Moyo (deputy commander of the air force).

According to the government, the soldiers planned on forcibly removing President Robert Mugabe from office and asking Rural Housing Minister Emmerson Mnangagwa to form a government with the heads of the armed forces. The government first heard of the plot when a former army officer who opposed the coup contacted the police in Paris, France, giving them a map and a list of those involved. Mnangagwa and State Security Minister Didymus Mutasa both said they did not know about the plot, Mnangagwa calling it "stupid."

Some analysts have speculated that rival successors to Mugabe, such as former Zimbabwe African National Liberation Army leader Solomon Mujuru, were possibly trying to discredit Mnangagwa.

Gilbert Kagodora, treasurer for the Movement for Democratic Change political party in Mashonaland Central, said he and Matapo were arrested by men whom he suspected work for the Central Intelligence Organization at 2:PM on May 29 in Harare.

We had gone to meet Matapo for business together with three other party activists at Winston Court along Fourth Street. Initially, they told us that we were being arrested for dealing in foreign currency and they then proceeded to blindfold us with masking tape. They also tied our hands and took us into a van downstairs. I could not tell exactly where they were driving us to.

Kagodora said he and Matapo were put in a basement where he believed Military Intelligence Unit officials tortured him, using electrical rods to elicit confessions. Interrogators asked about MDC terror camps in South Africa, leaders and financiers of the plot, petrol bombers in the MDC, and the Democratic Resistance Committee. On June 1 Kagodora came into the custody of the Law and Order section at Harare Central Police Station. He said he heard interrogators asking Matapo to reveal the names of army and police officers with ties to the coup d'état. Police released Kagadora on June 4.

== Charges and aftermath ==
Several men, either on active duty or retired from the Zimbabwe National Army, were arrested between May 29 and early June. They were present in secret court hearings twice in which family members and journalists were not allowed to attend. The case was heard by the High Court. Prosecutors accuse Albert Matapo of leading the coup and trying to "recruit as many soldiers as possible to take over the government and all camps and be in control of the nation after which he will announce to the nation that he was in control of government and would invite Minister Mnangagwa and service chiefs to form a government." Albert Rugowe, formerly an officer in the army, was accused of recruiting military officials for the coup. Captain Shepherd Maromo and Olivine Morale were also on trial.

According to a military source in Harare, the coup leaders allegedly contacted Western governments and asked them if they would support the coup. "The general feedback was that the western countries would publicly condemn the coup and privately support it only if it would restore democracy in Zimbabwe."

Treason charges were laid against Matapo and other civilians, but no treason trial ever took place, for lack of evidence. However seven men, former Army Captain Albert Matapo (who had retired from the army 16 years earlier in 1991), and six others, Emmanuel Marara, Oncemore Mudzurahona, Partson Mupfure, Nyasha Zivuku, Rangarirai Mazivofa and Shingirai Webster Mutemachani, ended up spending seven years in Chikurubi Prison, before being released on March 1, 2014. Matapo claimed they were severely tortured during interrogation, including electrocution to the genitals. He said they were not attempting a coup, and had no interest in supporting Mnangagwa (whom he deemed as bad as Mugabe, and potentially even worse than him), but were simply trying to form a political party, now called United Crusade for Achieving Democracy (UCAD), which was eventually launched by them in Harare on August 1, 2014.

Senior officers reportedly under house arrest in June 2007, such as Colonel Ben Ncube, Major-General Engelbert Rugeje and Air Vice Marshal Elson Moyo, remained in the army.

Emmerson Mnangagwa remained in office, and 10 years later was sworn in as President of Zimbabwe on 24 November 2017, after the resignation of Robert Mugabe following the 2017 Zimbabwean coup d'état, a removal that was however recognized by the African Union as a legitimate expression of the will of the Zimbabwean people.
