= 2017 Zimbabwean coup d'état =

Military overthrow of President Robert Mugabe

- Part of the 2016–17 Zimbabwe protests
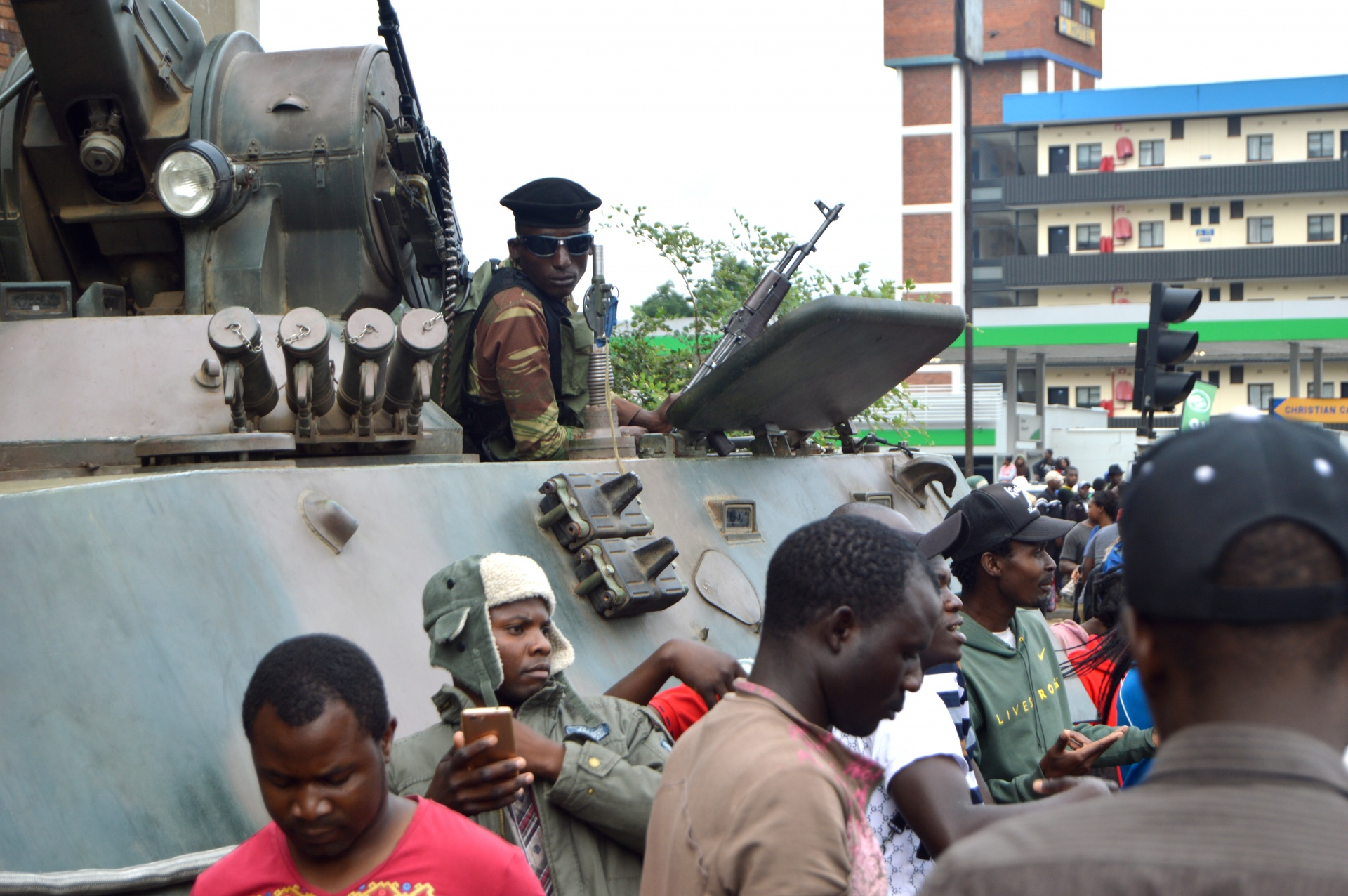
- A Zimbabwe Defence Forces APC in downtown Harare during the coup
| Date | 14–21 November 2017 (1 week) |
| Location | Harare, Zimbabwe |
| Result | Coup succeeded: Robert Mugabe resigns from the office of President of Zimbabwe after impeachment proceedings are initiated; Emmerson Mnangagwa becomes the 3rd President of Zimbabwe |

Belligerents
| Team Lacoste | Generation 40 |

Commanders and leaders
| Emmerson Mnangagwa (Vice-President): Constantino Chiwenga; Philip Valerio Sibanda; Perrance Shiri; Christopher Mutsvangwa; Sibusiso Moyo | Robert Mugabe (President): Grace Mugabe; Phelekezela Mphoko; Jonathan Moyo; Saviour Kasukuwere; Ignatius Chombo; Patrick Zhuwao; Walter Mzembi |

The 2017 Zimbabwean coup d'état was a bloodless military coup that took place in Zimbabwe on 14 to 21 November 2017, when Zimbabwean president Robert Mugabe was removed as president and party leader of ZANU–PF and was replaced by Emmerson Mnangagwa.

On the evening of 14 November 2017, elements of the Zimbabwe Defence Forces (ZDF) gathered around Harare, the capital of Zimbabwe, and seized control of the Zimbabwe Broadcasting Corporation and key areas of the city. The next day, the ZDF issued a statement saying that it was not a coup d'état and that President Mugabe was safe, although the situation would return to normal only after the ZDF had dealt with the "criminals" around Mugabe responsible for the socio-economic problems of Zimbabwe. Jacob Zuma, the then president of South Africa, phoned Mugabe and was told that Mugabe was under house arrest but otherwise "fine".

The uprising took place amid tensions in the ruling ZANU–PF party between former first vice-president Emmerson Mnangagwa (who was backed by the ZDF) and first lady Grace Mugabe (who was backed by the younger G40 faction) over who would succeed the 93-year-old president Mugabe. A week after Mnangagwa was fired and forced to flee the country, and a day before troops moved into Harare, ZDF chief Constantino Chiwenga issued a statement that purges of senior ZANU–PF officials like Mnangagwa had to stop.

On 19 November, ZANU-PF removed Mugabe as party leader, replacing him with Mnangagwa, and issued a deadline of 20 November for Mugabe to resign the presidency or face impeachment. Mugabe did not resign, so on 21 November a joint session of Parliament met for his impeachment. After the session convened, Mugabe sent a letter to Zimbabwe's Parliament resigning the presidency. Second Vice-President Phelekezela Mphoko became the Acting President. Mnangagwa was sworn in as president on 24 November 2017.

== Background ==
=== Early October ===
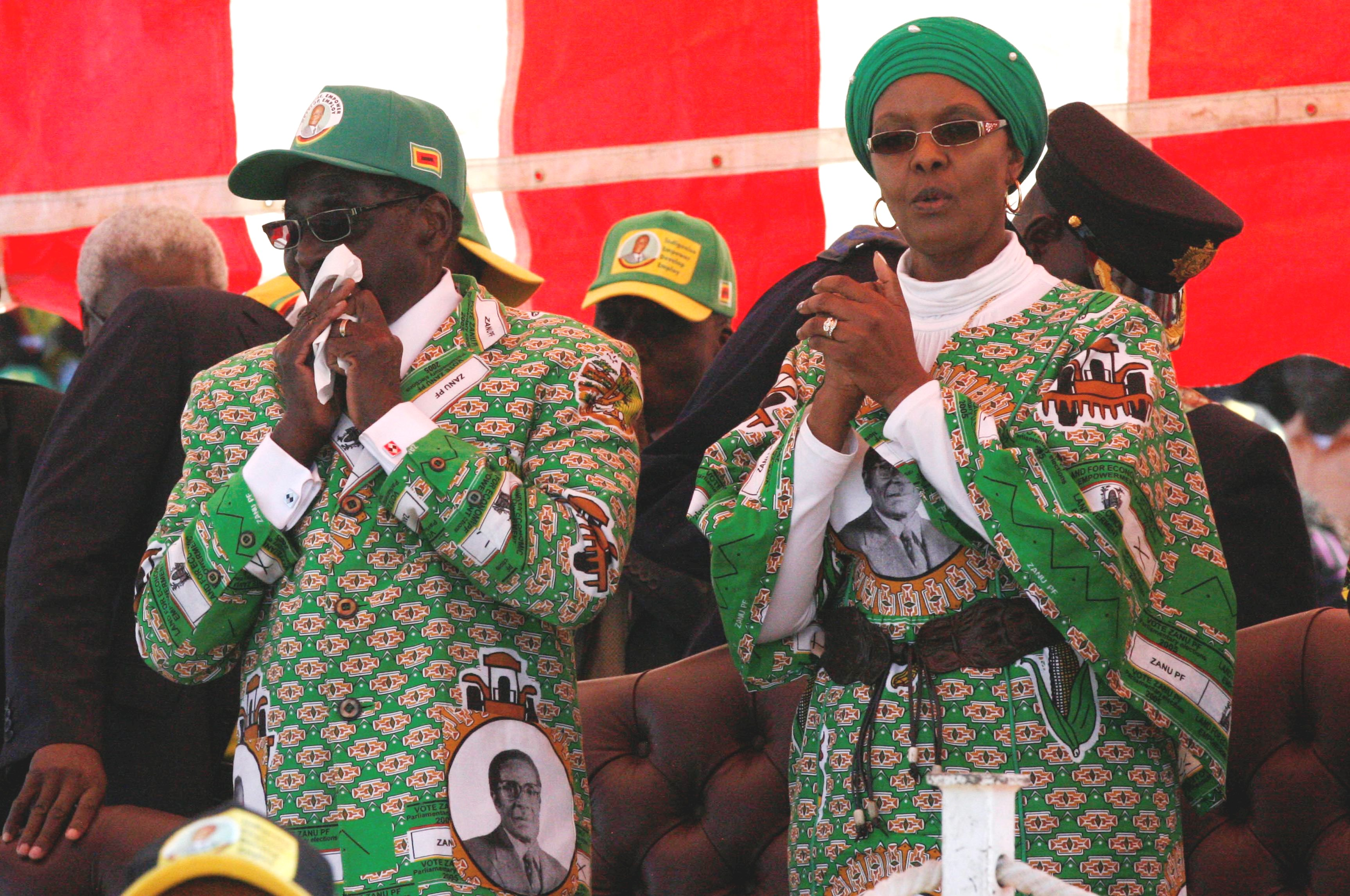
Robert Mugabe and Grace Mugabe in 2013

On the second week of October 2017, tensions between Vice-President Emmerson Mnangagwa and Grace Mugabe, two leading figures to replace the 93-year-old Robert Mugabe as President of Zimbabwe, were prominently displayed in the public sphere. Mnangagwa, a protégé of Mugabe's who had been his ally since the Zimbabwe War of Independence in the 1960s, said that doctors had confirmed that he had been poisoned during an August 2017 political rally led by the president and had to be airlifted to a hospital in South Africa for treatment. He also pledged his loyalty to the ZANU–PF party and President Mugabe and said that the story spread by his supporters that Grace Mugabe had ordered the poisoning via a dairy farm she controlled was untrue.

Grace Mugabe denied the poisoning claims as ridiculous and rhetorically asked: "Who is Mnangagwa, who is he?" Phelekezela Mphoko, Zimbabwe's other vice-president, publicly criticised Mnangagwa, saying that his comments about the August incident were part of an attempt to destabilise the country and undermine the authority of the president, since doctors had actually concluded that stale food was to blame.

=== 4 October ===
During a planned speech in Harare, Grace Mugabe went off-script to attack Mnangagwa, saying that her supporters were constantly receiving threats that if Mnangagwa did not succeed Mugabe, they would be assassinated and that the faction backing Mnangagwa was plotting a coup d'état.

At a rally, President Mugabe publicly rebuked Mnangagwa for the first time. At the same rally, Grace Mugabe called him a "coup plotter" and a "coward". The president fired Mnangagwa on 6 November. A statement from Information Minister Simon Khaya-Moyo said that Mnangagwa had "consistently and persistently exhibited traits of disloyalty, disrespect, deceitfulness and unreliability".

Mnangagwa's dismissal essentially left Grace Mugabe, supported by her Generation 40 (G40) faction of younger ZANU–PF officials, as the only major contender to succeed Robert Mugabe. Mnangagwa, one of Mugabe's last political allies who had stayed with him since independence in 1980, had the support of several generals in the Zimbabwean army, who had publicly stated that only a veteran of the war for independence – which would rule out Grace Mugabe – should rule the country. Although Mugabe had depended on support from the military to maintain his rule, in the last few years he had undertaken a systematic replacement of old veterans from the war of independence in important ZANU–PF party positions with younger officials who did not fight in the war. This move was seen as risky because Grace Mugabe was a divisive figure in Zimbabwe and did not have much support from important ZANU–PF officials from the liberation war era or in the South African region.

=== 8–12 November ===
On 8 November 2017, Mnangagwa fled to Mozambique and then South Africa to escape "incessant threats" against his family. Mnangagwa issued a statement saying that he did not plan to harm Mugabe. He told Mugabe, "You and your cohorts will instead leave ZANU–PF by the will of the people and this we will do in the coming few weeks." Mnangagwa vowed to return and called for members of ZANU–PF to abandon the president. After his exile, more than a hundred of Mnangagwa's alleged senior supporters were targeted for disciplinary sanctions by backers of Grace Mugabe.

That same day, Christopher Mutsvangwa also left for South Africa, where he warned South African intelligence that a military intervention was about to take place in Zimbabwe. Meanwhile, Zimbabwean army chief General Constantino Chiwenga was on an official visit to China, where he met generals Chang Wanquan and Li Zuocheng. While in China, General Chiwenga was advised by the military intelligence wing that Mugabe had ordered his arrest upon his return to Zimbabwe on 12 November 2017. Plans had already been put in place through the ZRP Support Unit (A paramilitary wing of the police). Soldiers loyal to Chiwenga, disguised as baggage handlers, overpowered the police at the airport and cleared the way for his arrival.

=== 13 November ===
Chiwenga called a press conference at the military headquarters where he read a statement saying that the military would intervene if their historical political allies continued to be targeted. He called recent events "treacherous shenanigans" and said that the military "will not hesitate to step in" if that was necessary to protect the Zimbabwean revolution. Chiwenga urged people to attend the December 2017 ZANU–PF party congress to exercise their democratic rights and that the party had been infiltrated by counter-revolutionaries. He also said that the infighting and purges in ZANU–PF had led to chaos and "no meaningful development in the country for the past five years". The statement was made with ninety high-ranking officers from important units of the Zimbabwe National Army present to create an image of army unity. The statement was originally broadcast on Zimbabwe Broadcasting Corporation, the state broadcaster, but pulled off the air, though there was no initial official government response.

== Timeline of events ==
=== 14 November ===
Military armoured vehicles were spotted on roadways around Harare, the capital of Zimbabwe, and drove in convoys through the city. The same day, Kudzanayi Chipanga, the leader of the ruling ZANU–PF party's youth league, which is aligned with Grace Mugabe, said that the Youth League was "ready to die" to try to prevent the army from deposing Mugabe and choosing a new leader, and that the generals should retire if they were unsatisfied with Mugabe's rule and wanted to become politicians. Mugabe attended a weekly meeting of the Zimbabwe cabinet in the afternoon. In the early evening after the cabinet meeting, Khaya-Moyo spoke for ZANU–PF and accused Chiwenga of treason and inciting insurrection.

That evening, soldiers took over the Harare offices of the state broadcaster, the Zimbabwe Broadcasting Corporation (ZBC), manhandling some of its employees. Workers at the ZBC were later told that they did not have to worry and that the troops were protecting the station. According to the military, the reason for its actions was that the ZBC had been ordered not to broadcast the military's statement the previous day.

Around 10:30 pm, Albert Ngulube, director of security of the Zimbabwean Central Intelligence Organisation, was arrested by soldiers after leaving Mugabe's home. He was beaten up at the Presidential Guard headquarters and was released on 17 November for medical treatment at a private hospital in the capital.

=== 15 November ===
The army then proceeded to raid the homes of twenty other people. Minister of Higher Education Jonathan Moyo was tipped off by a member of the army on early Wednesday morning and fled to the house of Saviour Kasukuwere, Minister of Local Government, and his family. That home was then attacked by the army around 2.30 am with gunfire before a ceasefire allowed the two families to escape to Mugabe's home. The army also raided the home of Finance Minister Ignatius Chombo, but they came under fire from his private Israeli security guards. One member of the guard was killed. Chombo was detained and assaulted by the troops; US$10 million in cash was found in the house. Police duties had been restricted and Police Commissioner Augustine Chihuri was missing, presumed arrested.

At 5 am Major General Sibusiso Moyo, the army chief of staff and an ally of Chiwenga's, spoke on behalf of the Zimbabwe Defence Forces in a broadcast on ZBC. Moyo asserted that it was not a military takeover and that President Mugabe was safe. However, the statement also said that the military was "targeting criminals" around Mugabe responsible for the country's socio-economic problems, and that after they achieved their aims, the situation would "return to normalcy". Moyo announced that all military leave was cancelled, soldiers should return to their barracks, security forces should "cooperate for the good of our country", and that "any provocation will be met with an appropriate response". Moyo also said that the independence of the judiciary of Zimbabwe was guaranteed and that citizens should remain calm and avoid unnecessary movement.

After the speech, the military apprehended Ignatius Chombo, the Zimbabwean finance minister and a leader of G40, the pro-Grace Mugabe faction of ZANU–PF. According to South Africa's The Times, other cabinet ministers seized who were leaders in G40 included Jonathan Moyo and Saviour Kasukuwere.

Also early that morning, gunfire and artillery were heard in the northern suburbs of Harare, where many government officials, including the president, had their residences. According to Agence France-Presse, a witness heard sustained gunfire near Mugabe's private home in the suburb of Borrowdale. Reuters reported an explosion close to the main campus of the University of Zimbabwe. Soldiers also blocked access to the Parliament of Zimbabwe, government buildings, courthouses, and the president's official residence in Harare. It was reported that two journalists were assaulted by the military and hospitalised.

The military announced a press conference for the morning, where it was expected that the responsible officers would present a deal with President Mugabe that settled his fate and that of his allies. However, the conference was delayed and then cancelled outright, possibly because of a breakdown in negotiations between Mugabe and the military.

For most of the morning, state-controlled television and radio stations simply rebroadcast Moyo's statement without further news updates, and played patriotic songs from the 1980s about independence alongside normal programming. State-owned newspaper The Herald ran headlines downplaying the military's actions and its website ran a live blog under the headline "Live and developing: No Military Takeover in Zim".

By the afternoon, the roadblocks around key government buildings in Harare had been removed, armoured vehicles were off the streets, and there was no longer extra security in the Borrowdale suburb, where most senior officials had their private homes. Although there was less overall traffic in the city, ordinary activities like school, administrative offices, and businesses returned to normal. Outside Harare, including Bulawayo, the country's second-largest city, Zimbabweans experienced little to no added military presence.

The same day, ZBC broadcast an apology from ZANU–PF youth wing leader Kudzai Chipanga to General Chiwenga, whom he had criticised the day before. Chipanga said that he made his statement voluntarily and that he and other members of the youth league "are still young and make mistakes".

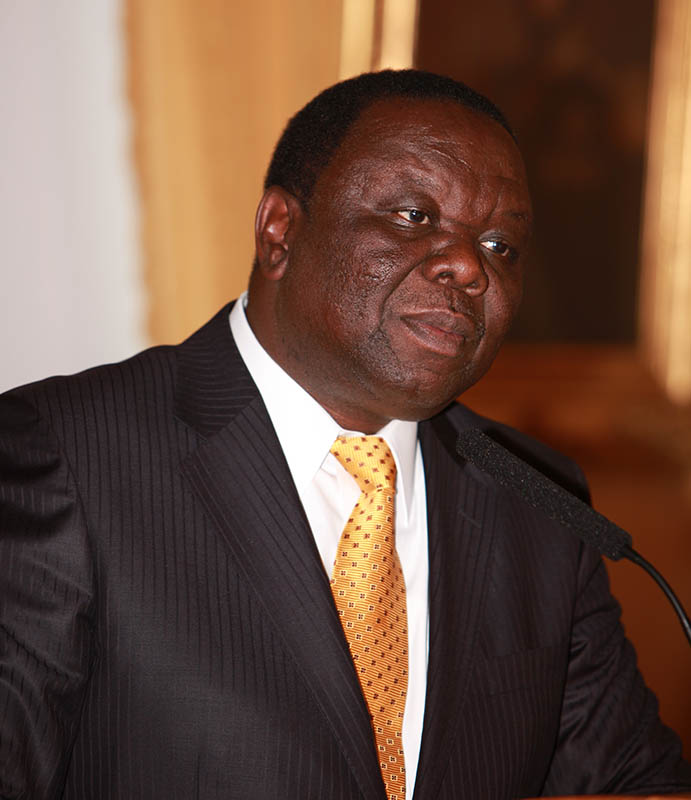
Morgan Tsvangirai

Morgan Tsvangirai, the former prime minister and leader of the main opposition party Movement for Democratic Change – Tsvangirai, who had won 42% of the popular vote against Mugabe's 56.2% in the 2002 presidential election, returned from receiving cancer treatments abroad. Soon after his return to the country, Tsvangirai called for Mugabe to step down.

=== 16 November ===
ZANU–PF MP and government minister Paul Chimedza was arrested at an army roadblock in Bubi while attempting to flee to South Africa. In Harare, armoured vehicles remained at key locations.

=== 17 November ===
Mugabe presided at a graduation ceremony at Zimbabwe Open University.

=== 18 November ===
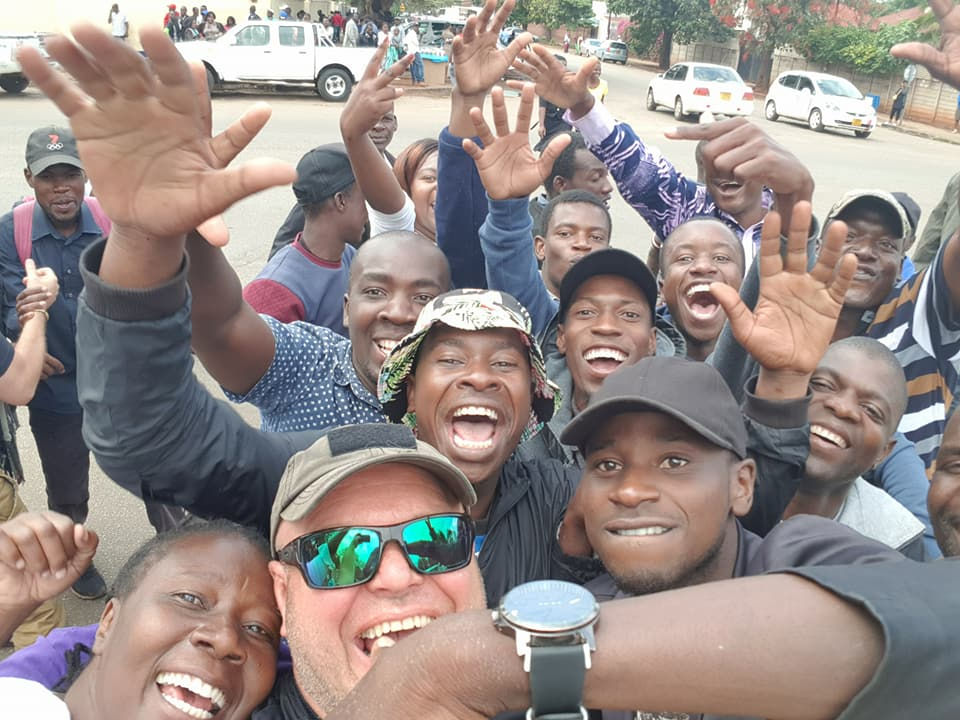
Citizens in the streets of Harare, 19 November 2017

There were well-attended and exuberant but peaceful public demonstrations in Harare and in all major towns in the country, supporting the actions of the army and celebrating the apparent end of Mugabe's presidency. Demonstrators also massed outside his office calling on him to quit. Protesters booed and jeered a motorcade that left Mugabe's residence, although a security source stated that Mugabe was not travelling.

=== 19 November ===
Mugabe was sacked by his party, and his wife and 20 of her associates were expelled as party members. However, in a speech delivered in Harare and broadcast on state television around the country, Mugabe ignored the party's actions and the political pressure around him, declining to resign and saying he would preside over the upcoming party conference. ZANU-PF issued Mugabe a deadline of noon on 20 November to resign or face impeachment.

=== 20 November ===
Mugabe ignored the noon deadline for his resignation. Paul Mangwana, ZANU–PF's deputy secretary for legal affairs, said that impeachment could be set in motion as early as the next day. Mugabe would be impeached on the basis that he "allowed his wife to usurp constitutional power".

Mangwana announced that party members had "unanimously" agreed to remove Mugabe from office and would work with the opposition MDC party to remove Mugabe in a two-day period. Mangwana also stated that a committee would be set up on 21 November and that the vote for impeachment would occur on 22 November.

Chiwenga announced in a televised address that Mnangagwa would soon return to Zimbabwe and hold talks with Mugabe, with whom he had now been in contact, and that the military coup, dubbed "Operation Restore Legacy", was progressing well.

Reuters reported that impeachment proceedings would proceed after the ruling ZANU–PF party completed the draft for a motion of impeachment. A copy of the draft, which also included a motion for a no-confidence vote, was obtained by British newspaper The Daily Telegraph. Of ZANU–PF's 250 lawmakers, all but 20 at a caucus meeting endorsed the impeachment motion, according to party chairman Simon Khaya-Moyo.

Tsvangirai called for an all-stakeholders meeting to chart the country's future and an internationally supervised process for the forthcoming elections. He said an all-inclusive process to take the country to legitimacy was the only way forward.

=== 21 November ===
In a sitting of the House of Assembly, Senator Monica Mutsvangwa of the ZANU–PF caucus made the motion to convene a joint session of Parliament with the full Senate for the impeachment of Mugabe, and MP James Maridadi of the MDC-T seconded the motion. The MPs then adjourned to the Harare International Conference Centre for the joint session because the Parliament building could not accommodate a joint sitting. The joint session was tasked with deciding on impeachment by a majority vote and selecting a nine-member committee to investigate the allegations against Mugabe:

# serious misconduct;

1. failure to obey, uphold and defend the Constitution;
2. willful violation of the Constitution;
3. inability to perform the functions of the Office because of physical or mental incapacity.

If this committee recommended impeachment, the joint sitting had to approve the recommendation by a two-thirds majority (233 seats of the 347-seat total). However, both major parties supported the motion and controlled all but four seats in the House of Assembly and all but two seats in the Senate between them. Mugabe's impeachment and removal thus appeared all but certain.

Prior to the session, a cabinet meeting called by Mugabe was snubbed by 17 out of 22 members, with the absentees opting to attend a mandatory meeting of the ZANU–PF parliamentary caucus. Mnangagwa wrote a letter saying that he could not meet personally with Mugabe while his safety could not be guaranteed. The letter also urged Mugabe to resign.

The crisis harmed Zimbabwe's economy, with investors dumping Zimbabwean stocks, sending them falling 10% on Monday to an eight-week low of 387.38.

At 18:00 CAT Mugabe resigned. His resignation, in the form of an official statement, was announced by Speaker of Parliament Jacob Mudenda to the joint session. Many of the legislators in every party cheered happily right after Mudenda read Mugabe's resignation letter. In accordance with the Zimbabwean constitution, the Vice-President, Phelekezela Mphoko, became acting president, pending nomination of a new candidate by the ruling party. However, as he was out of the country at the time, it is disputed whether or not he served in that acting position. The ZANU–PF chief whip duly nominated Mnangagwa, telling news organisations that he would take over as president within 48 hours.

== Post-resignation events ==
=== 22 November ===
Mnangagwa arrived in Zimbabwe in the afternoon and gave a speech to the public outside of ZANU-PF headquarters, pledging "the beginning of a new unfolding democracy". The Zimbabwe Broadcasting Corporation posted a report that Mnangagwa would be sworn on 24 November as interim president to serve out the remainder of Mugabe's term in office.

=== 24 November ===
Mnangagwa was sworn in.

== Mugabe's house arrest, negotiations, and resignation ==
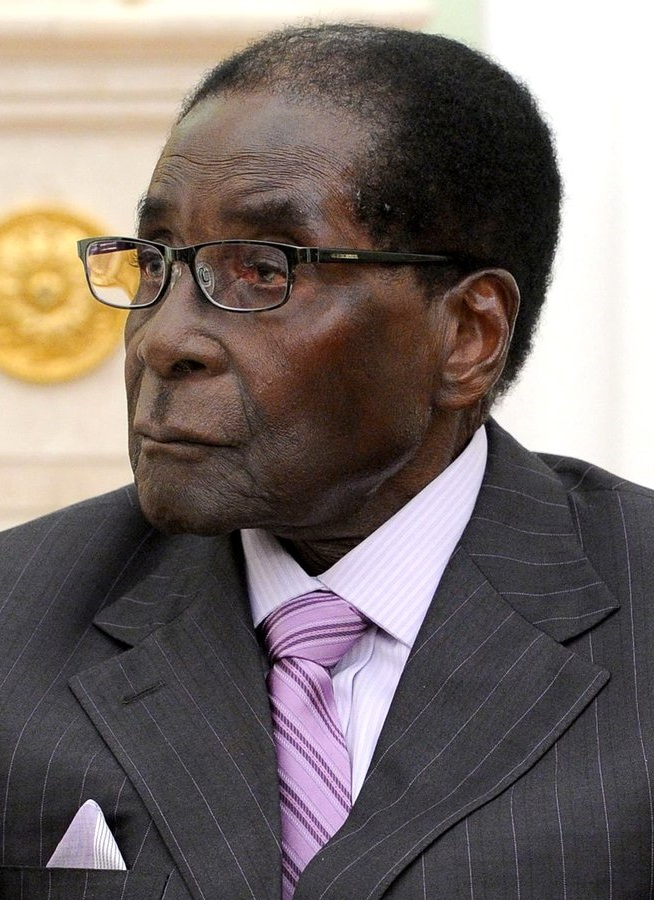
President Robert Mugabe, 93, who under different titles led Zimbabwe between 1980 and 2017

Major General Moyo's initial statement said that "Mugabe and his family are safe and sound, and their security is guaranteed", indicating that President Mugabe and Grace Mugabe were likely both under military custody, though no clarifications were initially issued. South African president Jacob Zuma said that Robert Mugabe had been placed under house arrest at Blue Roof by the Zimbabwe military. Mugabe told Zuma in a phone call that he was fine but was unable to leave his home.

Sky News reported that there were unconfirmed reports that Grace Mugabe had fled to Namibia. The Guardian also initially cited unconfirmed reports that she was in Namibia for a business trip, but later reported that she was apparently in detention with the rest of the family. On 15 November, Namibia neither confirmed nor denied the reports that Grace Mugabe was in the country. However, on 16 November, state-owned newspaper New Era quoted Namibian deputy prime minister Netumbo Nandi-Ndaitwah denying that Grace Mugabe was in the country.

On 15 November, South African Defence Minister Nosiviwe Mapisa-Nqakula and State Security Minister Bongani Bongo arrived at the Harare airport but were not allowed to leave the airport until the evening, when they were allowed to move to a hotel. On 16 November, Mugabe was at Harare's State House to participate in talks with General Chiwenga and the two envoys from the Southern African Development Community over a transition of power. His friend and Catholic priest Fidelis Mukonori acted as a mediator. Others present were Zimbabwe's Defence Minister and State Security Minister, Sydney Sekeramayi and Kembo Mohadi respectively. One of the leading figures in the alleged coup attempt of 2007, Air Vice Marshal Elson Moyo, was also present.

According to sources referred to by The Daily Telegraph and BBC News, Mugabe and his allies did not support his voluntary resignation before the end of his presidential term, which would coincide with the planned general election in 2018. That same day, The Independent reported that ZANU–PF leaders planned to meet the next day to draft a resolution dismissing Mugabe as president on 19 November and impeaching him on 21 November if he refused to step down.

On 17 November, Mugabe appeared to have been temporarily released from his house arrest to attend a graduation ceremony at Zimbabwe Open University in Harare.

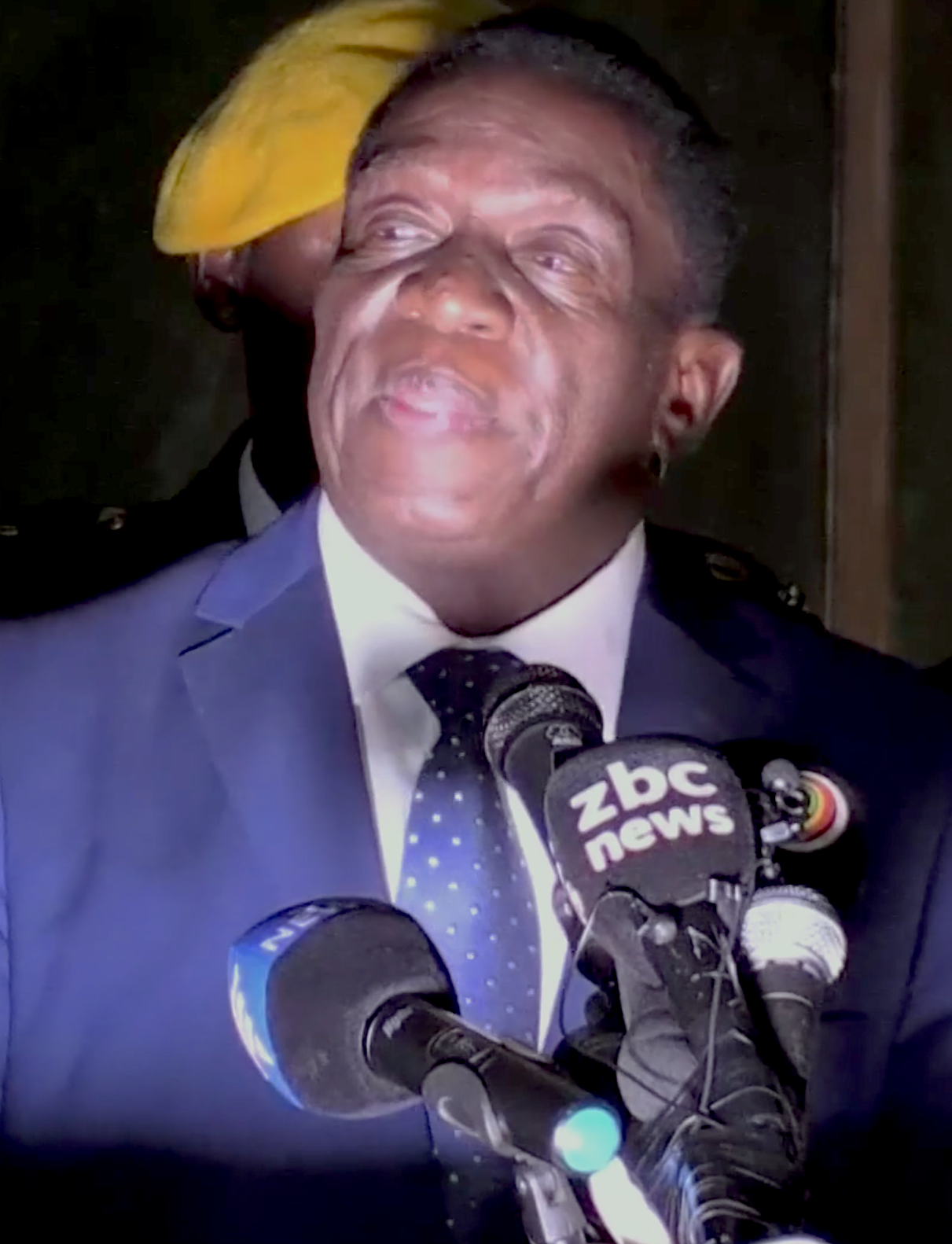
On 19 November, Emmerson Mnangagwa replaced Mugabe as the leader of ZANU–PF.

On 19 November, Mugabe was sacked as the leader of ZANU–PF, and Emmerson Mnangagwa, the former Zimbabwean vice-president, appointed in his place. Reports emerged that Mugabe was on hunger strike, refusing to voluntarily step down as President of Zimbabwe. The same day, Grace Mugabe and 20 of her associates were expelled from ZANU–PF. Reports later that day suggested that Mugabe would resign during a television address that evening. However, during that address he said that he would remain as president.

On 20 November, the country's military commander General Constantino Chiwenga announced in a televised address to the nation that former vice-president Emmerson Mnangagwa would soon return to Zimbabwe to resume talks with Mugabe and that he was encouraged by the contact between Mnangagwa, whom the army wanted to succeed Mugabe, and the President. On the same day, a motion to impeach and hold a no confidence vote against Mugabe was drafted by Lovemore Matuke, the ZANU–PF chief whip in parliament, before Mugabe finally resigned at 18:00 CAT by sending a letter to the Speaker of Parliament. Vice-President Phelekezela Mphoko became the Acting President.

There was little interest among the political elite in prosecuting Mugabe, with those who had sought his impeachment in the past arguing he should be "allowed to rest". On 23 November, military authorities agreed to grant Mugabe and his wife immunity from prosecution. The couple was also to receive no less than $10 million, according to the constitution.

== Reactions ==
=== Domestic ===
Nelson Chamisa, the deputy leader of the Movement for Democratic Change – Tsvangirai, the main opposition party in Zimbabwe, called for "peace, constitutionalism, democratization, the rule of law and the sanctity of human life". Tendai Biti, the leader of another opposition party, called for a "roadmap back to legitimacy" through a transitional government and dialogue with regional organisations. Evan Mawarire, a pastor and civic activist who had been arrested during the 2016–17 protests, asked citizens to "remain calm and hopeful, alert but prayerful" and that the crisis was "the culmination" of citizen activist work. Christopher Mutsvangwa, leader of the Zimbabwe National Liberation War Veterans Association and an ally of Mnangagwa, praised Army General Constantino Chiwenga for "a bloodless correction of gross abuse of power" and hoped that the army would restore a "genuine democracy" to Zimbabwe. Former vice-president Joice Mujuru called for a transitional government focusing on economic recovery and electoral reform.

=== International ===
==== Africa ====
Jacob Zuma, the President of South Africa, phoned Mugabe and confirmed his house arrest. Zuma also asked for calm and a transition that was in accordance with the Constitution of Zimbabwe. He also sent a ministerial-level envoy to talk with the leaders of the Zimbabwe military. Julius Malema, the leader of the Economic Freedom Fighters party and previously a Mugabe supporter, voiced support for the army's initiative. He tweeted: "Someone had to do something, the army should make sure that there is no loss of life however anyone seeking to undermine this transition should be dealt with decisively. Finally free and stable Zimbabwe is coming in our life time." Mmusi Maimane, the leader of the Democratic Alliance party simply stated that Mugabe must step down and called him a dictator. He also called for the democratic process to be upheld. Nedbank, a major South African bank, sent home several of its South African employees working for its Zimbabwean subsidiary, MBCA Bank.

Netumbo Nandi-Ndaitwah, the Foreign Minister of Namibia, said that the incident "creates uncertainty that is not conducive to peace, stability, and consolidation of democracy in Zimbabwe and the region as a whole" and said that Namibia expected that democratic institutions in Zimbabwe would continue to function under its constitution. Nandi-Ndaitwah also said that the Namibian government expected Zimbabwe to abide by the Southern African Development Community's Treaty on Governance and the African Union Constitutive Act. On 16 November, Namibia denied reports that Grace Mugabe was in the country.

Alpha Condé, the President of Guinea and the leader of the African Union, rebuked the actions of the military and demanded the immediate restoration of the rule of law under the Zimbabwean Constitution. Edgar Lungu, the President of Zambia, condemned the events, saying that they were "not in tune with modern politics". While Abdelaziz Benali Cherif, the Foreign Minister of Algeria, called for respect for Zimbabwe's constitutional order. Fatoumata Tambajang, Vice-President of the Gambia, called for dialogue between the military and political leadership to solve the crisis.

The Southern African Development Community (SADC) held an urgent meeting at the SADC headquarters in Gaborone on 16 November. The meeting was called by Zuma and was expected to be attended by the leaders of Angola, Tanzania, and Zambia.

On 22 November, Kenya's former prime minister Raila Odinga, a key mediator of the 2008–09 Zimbabwean political negotiations, hailed Zimbabwe for "peacefully overthrowing tyranny and dictatorship". The African Union issued a statement in which it refrained from describing the military intervention as a 'coup', but instead said Mugabe's ouster was a legitimate expression of the will of the Zimbabwean people.

==== Beyond Africa ====
Foreign embassies, including the American, Canadian, French, British and Dutch embassies in Harare, issued warnings to citizens of their countries to stay indoors because of the military activity in the city. A German spokesperson for the Federal Foreign Office told a press conference in Berlin that "We see developments there with concern ... The situation there is confusing and unclear." British foreign secretary Boris Johnson called "for everybody to refrain from violence" and stated that "everybody wants to see a stable and successful Zimbabwe".

While Australian prime minister Malcolm Turnbull characterised the Mugabe regime as a dictatorship, the Australian Department of Foreign Affairs and Trade upgraded its travel advice, warning Australians to reconsider travelling to the country. The Chinese Foreign Ministry claimed that a meeting which occurred on 10 November between General Chiwenga and Chinese defence minister Chang Wanquan was innocuous and that China hoped that "the relevant parties in Zimbabwe [would] appropriately handle their internal matters".

Venezuelan foreign minister Jorge Arreaza called for the "immediate restoration of the democratic institution and the respect for the Constitution".

António Guterres, the Secretary-General of the United Nations, through his deputy spokesperson, Farhan Haq, encouraged peace and resolution through negotiation within the workings of Zimbabwean Constitution. The UN also acknowledged the efforts of the SADC in resolving the crisis. European Commission spokesperson Catherine Ray stated that the situation "is a matter of concern for the EU" and called for "peaceful resolution".

Deputy Russian prime minister Yury Trutnev, on a visit to Southern Africa, directly blamed President Robert Mugabe for getting himself into trouble by failing to address the socioeconomic issues of the country which had left Zimbabweans impoverished and angry.

United States Secretary of State Rex Tillerson called Mugabe's resignation a "historic moment" for the country. He further congratulated Zimbabweans for peacefully bringing about a change which "was overdue" and emphasised that the United States would support Zimbabwe in transitioning to a stable, democratic government and economy.

British prime minister Theresa May welcomed Mugabe's resignation stating that it "provides Zimbabwe with an opportunity to forge a new path free of the oppression that characterised his rule".

== Analysis ==
Derek Matyszak, an analyst from the Institute for Security Studies, said that it was rare to see tanks on Zimbabwe's roads, and that their mere presence meant that the country was "entering new territory". According to Nii Akuetteh, an African policy analyst, the army's decision to present its actions as not being a coup was to avoid garnering opposition to their actions.

Brian Latham, a journalist with Bloomberg, judged that the future succession to Mugabe would be determined by four power brokers in the Zimbabwe elite. In addition to Emmerson Mnangagwa and Constantine Chiwenga, Latham also deemed that the influence of Lieutenant-General Philip Valerio Sibanda and Air Marshal Perrance Shiri would be decisive.

A 2019 study argued that the coup occurred "because soldiers from Zimbabwe's 1970s independence war subscribed to the coup's stated ideal to restore liberation struggle principles in the ruling Zimbabwe African National Union Patriotic Front party as well as party members who had been sidelined. Liberation war veterans held decisive army and air force command posts when the coup occurred... the coup's catalyst was Mugabe's refusal to meet his generals on 13 November 2017, for vital talks on widening differences between both parties. Sealing off dialogue catalyzed the coup."

=== Alleged Chinese involvement ===
Days before the coup, General Constantino Chiwenga visited China to meet senior Chinese military leaders, including Generals Chang Wanquan and Li Zuocheng. Chiwenga's visit to China has come under scrutiny, with speculation that he had sought Beijing's tacit approval for a possible move against Mugabe. However, the Chinese Foreign Ministry said that his visit was a "normal military exchange." The Chinese embassy in South Africa called the reports of Chinese involvement "contradictory, full of logical inconsistencies, and motivated by evil intentions."

== See also ==
- 2016–17 Zimbabwe floods
- 2016–17 Zimbabwe protests
- 2007 Zimbabwean alleged coup d'état attempt
- 2018 Bulawayo bombing
- 2018 Zimbabwean general election
- Constitution of Zimbabwe § Presidential succession
