= Chikurubi Prison =

Prison in Zimbabwe

Coordinates: 17.811667°S 31.163035°E

Chikurubi Prison is a maximum security prison in Zimbabwe. Located on the outskirts of the country's capital, Harare, the prison is notorious for alleged mistreatment and human rights abuses. The prison is known for its overcrowding and poor sanitary conditions. Cells typically measure 9 metres (30 ft) by 4 metres (13 ft), and there are as many as 25 prisoners housed in each cell.

== Notable prisoners ==
- Roy Bennett, Zimbabwean politician and former colonial policeman
- Simon Mann, British mercenary and former British Army officer
- Munyaradzi Kereke, former wealthy businessman, former ZANU–PF MP, and former advisor to retired Reserve Bank of Zimbabwe governor Gideon Gono, sentenced in 2016 to 10 years in jail after being convicted of raping his then 11-year-old niece, at the end of a decade-long legal campaign to bring him to justice despite him allegedly being protected by police and the Attorney General's office. Kereke has apologised to "Gono and the government but not to his victims".
- Former Army Captain Albert Matapo (who retired in 1991, 16 years before his alleged coup attempt), and six others, Emmanuel Marara, Oncemore Mudzurahona, Partson Mupfure, Nyasha Zivuku, Rangarirai Mazivofa and Shingirai Webster Mutemachani, ended up spending seven years in Chikurubi Prison for alleged involvement in the 2007 Zimbabwean alleged coup d'état attempt. They were accused of planning a coup d'état to replace Robert Mugabe by Emmerson Mnangagwa, but claim they were only trying to form a new political party, and deemed Mnangagwa as bad as Mugabe, and potentially even worse. No treason trial took place, for lack of evidence, and they were released on March 1, 2014, and subsequently launched their new political party. Matapo later described the prison as "hell".
- Chidhumo and Masendeke, the only criminal duo who launched the only successful prison break of the Chikurubi Prison.
- Evan Mawarire, a democracy activist who started #ThisFlag Citizens Movement against corruption, injustice and poverty. Mawarire was held in Chikurubi on separate arrests in February 2017 and January 2019 charged with treason. He was released on bail after weeks in the prison.https://www.reuters.com/article/markets/commodities/zimbabwe-activist-pastor-detained-over-protests-to-apply-for-bail-idUSL8N1ZO6SO/
- Hopewell Chin'ono, a journalist and frequent critic of the government.
- Hans Arne Ingemar Petersson, a previously law-abiding Swedish pensioner who was arrested at Robert Mugabe Airport in Harare after attempting to smuggle 3 kg of heroin in a pink suitcase. It is considered likely that Hans was deceived by a Thai woman whom he met in Sweden. Hans is currently serving a 15 year sentence in Chikurubi, where he is expected to die. https://www.newsday.co.zw/local-news/article/200010033/swedish-national-nabbed-over-3kg-heroin
