= 2016–2017 Zimbabwe protests =

Protests in Zimbabwe

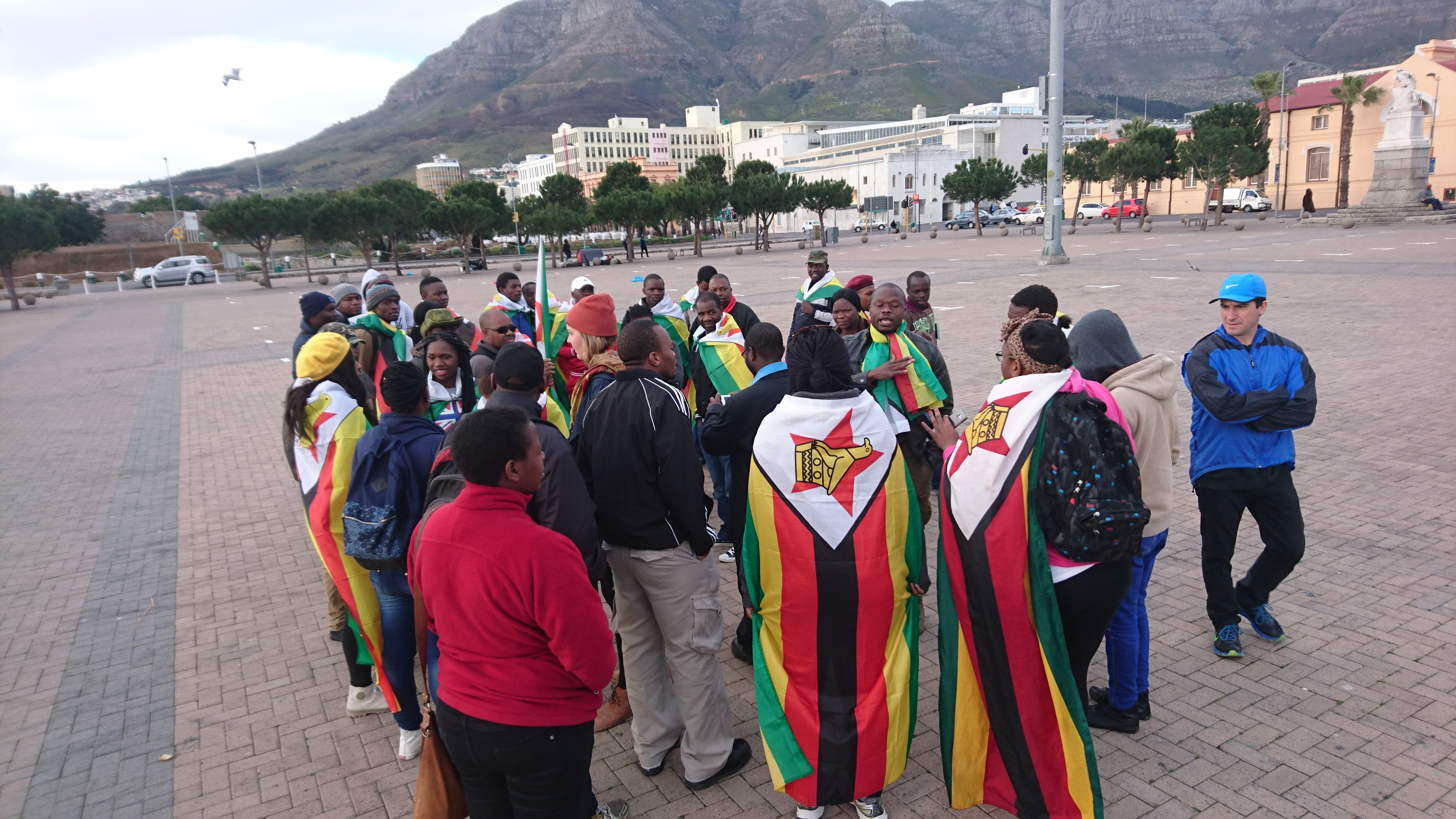
- Zimbabweans protesting in Cape Town, South Africa in support of the 2016 Zimbabwe protests taking place in Zimbabwe at the time.
- Date: 6 July 2016 – 21 November 2017
- Location: Zimbabwe; cities across South Africa, England, United States, Australia, Canada
- Caused by: Corruption, hunger, late payment of civil servants' salaries, economic repression, police brutality
- Goals: Firing corrupt ministers, the removal of police checkpoints, paying civil servants on time, stopping the introduction of bond notes, regime change, release of arrested activists, stopping police brutality
- Methods: Civil resistance, demonstrations, protest marches, rioting, picketing
- Result: Robert Mugabe resigns as President of Zimbabwe following the military takeover of the country

Parties
#ThisFlag movement; Tajamuka/Sesjikile campaign; MDC-T; War veterans	ZANU-PF-led government

Lead figures
Evan Mawarire; Promise Mkwananzi; Patson Dzamara; Christopher Mutsvangwa	Robert Mugabe; Ignatius Chombo; Jonathan Moyo

Casualties and losses
- Arrests: *100+; Injuries: *100+; Deaths

The 2016–2017 Zimbabwe protests began in Zimbabwe on 6 July 2016. Thousands of Zimbabweans protested government repression, poor public services, high unemployment, widespread corruption and delays in civil servants receiving their salaries. A national strike, named "stay-away day," began on 6 July and subsequent protests took place across the country and diaspora.

The Zimbabwean government blamed Western governments for the protests and were accused of blocking social media such as WhatsApp from 9 am until 11 am on 6 July 2016 to prevent people from gathering to protest.

On 18 November 2017, anti-Mugabe solidarity protests were held in Zimbabwe and other countries, following the military takeover of the country on 15 November. On 21 November, Robert Mugabe sent a letter to Zimbabwe's Parliament resigning the presidency.

== Background ==
The economy of Zimbabwe began shrinking significantly around 2000, following a series of events and government policies such as the fast-track land reform programme and the 1997 War Veterans' Compensation Fund pay-out. This led to hyperinflation, devaluation and the eventual collapse of the Zimbabwean dollar, high unemployment and general economic depression over the course of sixteen years.

The 2009 collapse of the Zimbabwean dollar led to the government's adoption of the US dollar and the informal adoption of other currencies (e.g. the South African rand and the Botswana pula). However, due to US dollars becoming scarce in circulation, to address the shortages, the government announced that it would issue its own notes known as "bond notes" that would be equivalent to US dollars. This led to widespread voiced resistance and campaigns by Zimbabweans around the country, fearing the return of the Zimbabwean dollar.

On 19 April 2016, Pastor Evan Mawarire posted a Facebook video calling for reform. The video begins with Mawarire stating, "I'm not a politician; I'm not an activist... just a citizen". As the emotive music plays, Mawarire wears the Zimbabwe flag and goes through each colour of the flag's stripes: "They tell me that the green is for the vegetation and for the crops. I don't see any crops in my country." He then returns to each colour again, stating how each colour should be an inspiration: the green "is the power of being able to push through soil, push past limitations and flourish and grow." He ends the viral video by promising to stop standing on the sidelines and start fighting for his country. From 1 May to 25 May, Mawarire headed an online campaign in a series of videos over social media, urging Zimbabweans around the world to wear the Zimbabwean flag around their necks and speak-up against the government.

== Pre-protests ==
On 24 June 2016, a protest was held at the Rainbow Towers Hotel, with protesters demanding that Vice President Phelekezela Mphoko vacate the hotel's presidential suite in which he has been staying with his family since December 2014. This protest was led by the Tajamuka/Sesjikile, National Vendors Union and Restoration of Human Rights groups.

Earlier in May 2016, the government had announced that it would impose an import ban on specified goods. On 1 July 2016, cross-border traders began protesting against this ban on both sides of the Zimbabwe-South Africa Beitbridge border post, calling for the ban's removal. This resulted in the burning of a Zimbabwe Revenue Authority warehouse, temporary closure of the border post and several arrests.

The national stay-away day came after clashes between taxi drivers and the police two days earlier, with 95 people being arrested and several more beaten with truncheons/baton sticks and harassed. President Robert Mugabe met with senior Zimbabwean officials to discuss the situation.

== 2016 main protest timeline ==
On 6 July 2016, national "stay-away" protests, organized over the Internet via WhatsApp, Twitter and Facebook social messaging platforms, using mainly the #ZimShutDown2016, #Tajamuka and #ThisFlag hashtags, took place in Zimbabwe, following fears of an economic collapse amid calls for President Robert Mugabe's resignation. These were organised by the #ThisFlag movement, the Tajamuka/Sesjikile campaign and other groups. On 7 July 2016, Zimbabwean authorities arrested dozens of protesters as anti-government protests spread across the country. In the capital, Harare, the protests forced the closure of banks and shops.

Protests in Harare and throughout the country were still ongoing on 8 July 2016, despite police intimidation and calls from President Mugabe for them to stop. Mugabe, in a live national television broadcast from a stadium in Bindura, blamed Western sanctions for his country's inability to pay government workers on time. #ThisFlag protest leader Pastor Evan Mawarire said the movement, which uses WhatsApp, Facebook, and Twitter, would hold a two-day strike the following week from 13 to 14 July if demands were not met. This included the sacking of corrupt ministers, payment of delayed salaries, and lifting of roadblocks that residents say are used by police to extract bribes. Also, a drought has aggravated the country's situation resulting in millions requiring food aid. Despite Mawarire's call for a strike, most businesses remained open on the 13–14th of July.

On 21 July 2016, the Zimbabwe National Liberation War Veterans Association (ZNLWVA) – a historically pro-Mugabe group of veterans of Zimbabwe's war of independence known for committing violence against opponents of the government – broke with Mugabe, calling him "dictatorial" and calling for free speech: "Regrettably, the general citizenry has previously been subjected to this inhuman and degrading treatment without a word of disapproval from us. That time has passed." Four war veterans' leaders were subsequently arrested for insulting and undermining the president's authority, and later released on bail. Following this, 9 ZNLWVA officials were dismissed from ZANU-PF including the 4 war veteran leaders, as Mugabe called for war veterans to elect new leadership.

Hundreds of protesters gathered in Harare on 3 August 2016, marching against the introduction of bond notes, with the aim of submitting a petition to the Ministry of Finance and Parliament. The protest was sanctioned by the courts, and the first petition rejecting bond notes was successfully delivered to the ministry. However, as protesters headed to Parliament to deliver a second petition, police chased and beat some of them using baton sticks and water cannons, leading to dispersion of the crowd. One BBC journalist was also beaten up by police in the scuffle and had his video camera broken. On the same day, expelled former vice-president Joice Mujuru filed a lawsuit at the Constitutional Court against Mugabe and the Reserve Bank of Zimbabwe, among other respondents, urging them to declare the introduction of bond notes unconstitutional.

Ahead of the second Test cricket match between Zimbabwe and New Zealand on 8 August in Bulawayo, Zimbabwe fans were asked by Pastor Evan Mawarire to join a peaceful protest in support of the #ThisFlag movement. In the 36th over on match day, to represent the 36 years under Mugabe and ZANU-PF rule, hundreds of spectators stood up, waved the Zimbabwean flag and sang the national anthem, while others ran around the pitch holding the flag. Ten people were arrested including unemployed graduates who wore their graduation gowns in protest against joblessness.

On 17 August, hundreds of protesters gathered and marched in Harare against the introduction of bond notes and police brutality, under the organisation of the Tajamuka/Sesjikile campaign and other groups. Their intention was to march to the Reserve Bank of Zimbabwe. Several protesters were beaten with baton sticks as they clashed with police. Tear gas and water cannons were also used to disperse the crowd.

Among the dozens detained in November for planning to protest, was Patson Dzamara, a high-profile opponent of Mugabe, who was found at a local hospital 24 hours after his burnt-out car was discovered, and who had apparently been badly beaten with sticks.

== Arrest and release of #ThisFlag leader ==
=== First arrest ===
On 12 July 2016, Pastor Evan Mawarire handed himself in for questioning at the request of the Zimbabwe Republic Police's Criminal Investigation Department (CID) to the Central Police Station in Harare. On 12 July, he was formally charged with section 36 for inciting public violence and disturbing the peace. On 13 July, in court, the prosecutors unexpectedly changed the charges to 'attempting to overthrow the government'; however, the judge halted the proceedings and stated: "the National Prosecuting Authority cannot charge the accused for the first time in court without charges being read out to him (in advance)". Mawarire was then released the same day.

On 16 July, Mawarire told the BBC: "Our protest – non-violent, non-inciting, stay-at-home – is the best because it is within the confines of the law." Speaking on 19 July, Mugabe denounced Mawarire, alleging that he promoted violence and was being sponsored by hostile Western governments. A large demonstration to express support for Mugabe and ZANU-PF was held in Harare on 20 July.

Following the comments by Mugabe castigating him, Mawarire who was visiting South Africa after his release, decided he would temporarily not be returning to Zimbabwe as he had concerns about his safety. At another ZANU-PF rally on 27 July, Mugabe stressed that the party would "not tolerate any nonsense" and warned Mawarire and his supporters: "Once you begin to interfere with our politics, you are courting real trouble. We know how to deal with our enemies who have been trying to bring about regime change." Mawarire has voiced protection of the Zimbabwean constitution.

He also warned foreign powers to stop trying to undermine his government, and he vowed that the war veterans responsible for a statement denouncing him several days prior would be identified and punished by the party.

=== Second arrest ===
Upon arrival at Harare International Airport on 1 February 2017 from the United States where he had been living in exile, Mawarire was detained and later charged with "subverting a constitutionally elected government" for the second time in 6 months.

== 2017 anti-Mugabe protests ==
Following the military takeover of Zimbabwe on 15 November 2017, thousands of Zimbabweans on 18 November, marched in solidarity through the streets of Harare and Bulawayo, among other places, calling for Mugabe to step down as president. The march was organised by various groups including the war veterans and Mawarire. Protestors also called for the Southern African Development Community to not interfere with the Zimbabwean political situation. Elsewhere, protesters gathered in Windhoek, Cape Town, Johannesburg and London.

On 20 November, students at the flagship University of Zimbabwe gathered outside exam venues, declaring that they would not write exams until Mugabe had resigned as president. They also demanded that the PhD degree that was awarded to First Lady Grace Mugabe be rescinded, citing that the integrity of the university had been compromised as a result. The degree was apparently awarded just three months after registration. As parliament met on 21 November in order to impeach Mugabe, a small group of protesters gathered outside the parliament building. While the session was underway, Mugabe submitted his letter of resignation as president of Zimbabwe.

== Demands ==
According to the BBC, the 2016 protestors had five demands:

- Pay civil servants on time
- Reduce roadblocks and stop officers harassing people for cash
- President Robert Mugabe should fire and prosecute corrupt officials
- Abandon plans to introduce bond notes
- Remove a recent ban on imported goods

== International response ==
- South Africa
  - Gwede Mantashe, the Secretary General of the ruling African National Congress stated that the Zimbabwe protests were sponsored by elements seeking regime change.
  - Julius Malema, the president of the Economic Freedom Fighters and previously a supporter of Robert Mugabe voiced support for the protests. He Tweeted: "We are on the side of the people of Zimbabwe, never be governed by fear. The people always win like you did in the 80s."
  - J'Something, lead vocalist of house music band Mi Casa, wore the Zimbabwean flag in apparent support for the #ThisFlag movement, while performing on stage in Bulawayo on 5 August 2016. He received criticism from information minister Jonathan Moyo on Twitter.

== See also ==
- 2017 Zimbabwean coup d'état
- Zimbabwean general election, 2018
