= Hopewell Chin'ono =

Zimbabwean journalist

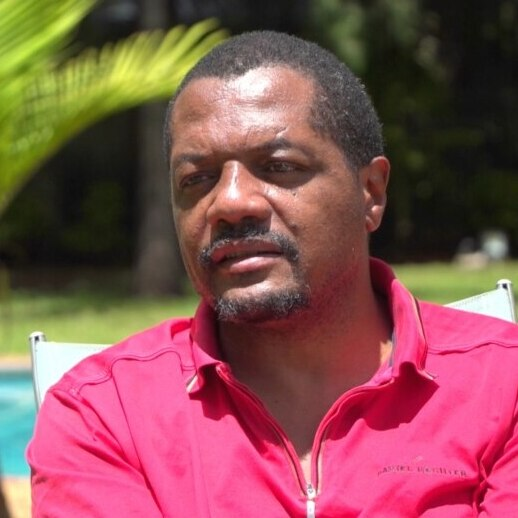
- in 2021
- Born: 26 March
- Education: City Universitty, Brunel & Harvard
- Occupation: Journalist

Hopewell Rugoho-Chin'ono is a Zimbabwean journalist born in Rhodesia. He has won numerous awards in journalism and has worked in both print and broadcasting journalism. He was a fellow at Harvard. He is a documentary film maker. He was the ITV News Africa Field Producer from 2008 to 2015 and New York Times Zimbabwe foreign correspondent from 2015 to 2017.

== Biography ==
Hopewell trained as a journalist at the Zimbabwean Institute of Mass Communications before getting his first post graduate Master of Arts degree in International Journalist from City University's Journalism school in London, England. After graduating from City University, he was a freelance radio producer and in 2003 he returned to Zimbabwe to work as a freelance correspondent for the BBC. The Zimbabwean government refused to give him a practicing license because of his link to the BBC.

He won a British Government Chevening scholarship in 2006 to read film at Brunel University, where he obtained a Master of Arts degree in Documentary Practice in 2007.

He returned to Zimbabwe in 2007 and made a documentary film called Pain in My Heart which won the 2008 CNN African Journalist of the year award, 2008 Archbishop Desmond Tutu Leadership Award and the Kaiser Family Foundation Award for Excellence in HIV/AIDS Reporting in Africa.

After making Pain in My Heart he set up Television International in Zimbabwe, a production house that produced news for ITN and South Africa's e.tv. He has also worked with CNN International as a field producer on special assignments and produced for Sky News, BBC Newsnight and Ireland's RTE.

In 2008 he went to the University of Oxford's Saïd Business School where he was awarded The Tutu Fellowship in African Leadership. Hopewell is a Nieman Fellow at Harvard University, the third Zimbabwean journalist to have win the Fellowship in journalism in 2009. In 2009 he was the winner of the US Aid Communication award in Zimbabwe for his HIV and Aids Reporting. In 2010 he was nominated for a Rory Peck television award for his documentary film A Violent Response. A Violent Response was nominated for a 2010 BANFF World Television Award in Canada.

Chin'ono was the television producer for UK's ITV News and the Zimbabwe Foreign Correspondent for The New York Times. He worked as South Africa's eNCA foreign correspondent and producer in Zimbabwe from February 2008 to April 2014. He temporarily left journalism to return to documentary film making. He directed State of Mind, a film looking at Zimbabwe's mental illness epidemic.

In 2020, Hopewell reported on alleged COVID-19 procurement fraud within the health ministry, which led to the arrest and sacking of Health Minister Obadiah Moyo. President Emmerson Mnangagwa fired Obadiah Moyo in July 2020 for "inappropriate conduct" over the $60 million medicines supply scandal.

On July 20, 2020, Hopewell was arrested and charged with inciting public violence. The US embassy called Hopewell's arrest "deeply concerning", while his lawyer called it "an abduction" and Amnesty accused Zimbabwean authorities of "misusing the criminal justice system to persecute journalists and activists".

He was freed in September on bail, then he was arrested again in November 2020 and was charged with obstructing justice and contempt of court for a tweet about the court outcome of a gold smuggling scandal involving the President's niece.

Hopewell Chin'ono was released on bail on January 27, 2021, after spending three weeks in prison. Chin'ono expressed concern about the COVID-19 pandemic in the overcrowded Chikurubi Prison and accuses the government of harassment for arresting him three times in five months.

In 2022 he won the United Nations International Anti-Corruption award which came with a US$250,000 prize.

In 2024 he was honored in having a chapter written about his work in a book called Moral Courage published in Canada. The biggest Canadian newspaper, the Globe and Mail acknowledged his work in Toronto, Canada in November 2024.

== Professional awards ==
=== 2022 ===
He won the International Anti-Corruption Excellence Award which was handed to him by the Emir of Qatar Sheikh Tamim bin Hamad Al Thani in Doha in the presence of President Paul Kagame of Rwanda, United Nations Under Secretary General, Dr Ghada Waly and the United Nations Special Advocate for the Prevention of Corruption, Dr. Al Marri. The award has a huge 6 figure cash payment.

=== 2020 ===
He won the People Journalism Prize for 2020 for his exposure of the massive COVID-19 looting of public funds.

=== 2018 ===
State of Mind It was the first documentary film made in Africa looking at mental health. It won a lot of awards and was screened in many international film festivals.

=== 2013 ===
Fearless: Beatrice Mtetwa & the Rule of Law. Co-produced with Lorie Conway. The documentary film looks at the life and works of Beatrice Mtetwa, a Zimbabwean human rights lawyer. It tells the story of the Rule of Law in Zimbabwe through the narratives of Beatrice's clients from journalists, human rights activist, opposition politician and gender activists. Aired on CNBC and Channel 4 The 2014 One Media Awards nomination in documentary section

=== 2010 ===
A Violent Response The documentary film looks at Zimbabwe's post-election violence. Hopewell Rugoho-Chin'ono worked on the production as the director, executive producer and director of photography.

The film won:

- The 2010 BANNF nomination in Canada
- The 2010 Rory Peck Award nomination for feature in London

=== 2008 ===
Last White Man, co-produced with Greek National Television. The film looks at the White Zimbabwean farmers and the Land Reform process. It is the image of Africa's ex-granary that became synonymous with poverty, inflation, corruption. It also looks at the historical aspects of the Land issue in Zimbabwe. Hopewell Rugoho-Chin'ono worked on the production as a Co-producer, Director of photography and Co-director.

=== 2008 ===
Inside Zimbabwe: Y Byd ar Bedwar, co-produced with ITV Wales, UK. A look at the starvation and levels of political intolerance taking place in Zimbabwe caused by bad governance and exacerbated by hyper inflation. This film was shot undercover for ITV Wales. Hopewell Rugoho-Chin'ono worked on the production as a Co-producer, Director of photography and Co-director.

=== 2007 ===
Pain in my Heart. A heart-breaking story of the HIV and Aids situation in Zimbabwe. It traces two HIV-infected Zimbabweans, one is on life saving Anti-Retroviral medication courtesy of a local church, the other is a single mother of two who fails to get medication and as a result dies, leaving two orphans. The film is a metaphor of the political situation in Zimbabwe. Hopewell Rugoho-Chin'ono worked on the production as the Documentary Film Director, Executive Producer and Co-director of photography.

The film won:

- The 2008 African Journalist of the year award
- The 2008 Henry Kaiser Foundation award for HIV & Aids Reporting in Africa
- The 2008 Archbishop Desmond Tutu Leadership award
- The 2009 USAID Communication Award

=== Academic qualifications ===
==== 2007 ====
Master of Arts Degree in Documentary Practice Brunel University, London, United Kingdom.

==== 2000 ====
Master of Arts Degree in International Journalism City University, London, United Kingdom.and also Uz

==== 1993 ====
Higher National Diploma in Mass Communications Zimbabwe Institute of Mass Communications, Harare, Zimbabwe.

=== Scholarship awards ===
==== 2009 ====
Robert Waldo Ruhl Scholarship Fund for Journalism to study at Harvard University as a Nieman Fellow in Cambridge, USA.

==== 2006 ====
Chevening British Government Scholarship to study Documentary Film Making at Brunel University in London, England.

=== Academic fellowships ===
==== 2010 ====
Nieman Global Health Journalism Fellowship Harvard University, Cambridge, Massachusetts, USA.

==== 2008 ====
Archbishop Desmond Tutu Fellowship for Young African Leaders Said Business School, University of Oxford, Oxford, United Kingdom.

=== Professional fellowships ===
- CNN Journalism Fellowship
