= 2016–2017 Zimbabwe floods =

- Date: December 2016 – March 2017
- Location: Zimbabwe
- Deaths: 251
- Injuries: 128 people
- Property damage: US$189m
- Displaced: ~2,000 people displaced, 160,000+ impacted

Zimbabwe experienced severe floods from December 2016 through March 2017 due to heavy rains that followed a two-year drought.

Zimbabwe's rainy season began in October 2016, continuing through December. The situation was worsened by Cyclone Dineo, which made landfall in Mozambique on 15 February 2017. It was downgraded to a tropical depression as it crossed into Zimbabwe the following day. Up to 100 mm of rain fell within 24 hours, causing the Gwayi River to overflow, flooding nearby villages and destroying homesteads and public infrastructure.

Forty-five districts were affected, with Matabeleland, Midlands, Masvingo, Mashonaland West, Manicaland, and Metropolitan provinces hit hardest. The government estimated that the floods killed 251 and injured at least 128 people. Private and public infrastructure were damaged or destroyed, including 5 bridges, more than 140 dams, 388 schools, and 2,579 houses, leaving many people marooned and homeless. Nearly 2,000 people were internally displaced in the worst affected Tsholotsho district, of which over 859 (mostly children) were sheltered in a temporary camp. Water supply infrastructure was damaged, compromising water quality, sanitation, and hygiene (WASH), leaving up to 100,000 people without safe drinking water, and contributing to disease outbreaks including typhoid, cholera, and malaria.

The Zimbabwean Government declared the floods a national emergency at the beginning of March 2017, issuing appeals to the private sector, development partners, NGOs, and foreign governments for international assistance. The total funding needed for immediate emergency assistance and long-term infrastructure rebuilding was estimated at US$189 million.

== Contributing factors ==
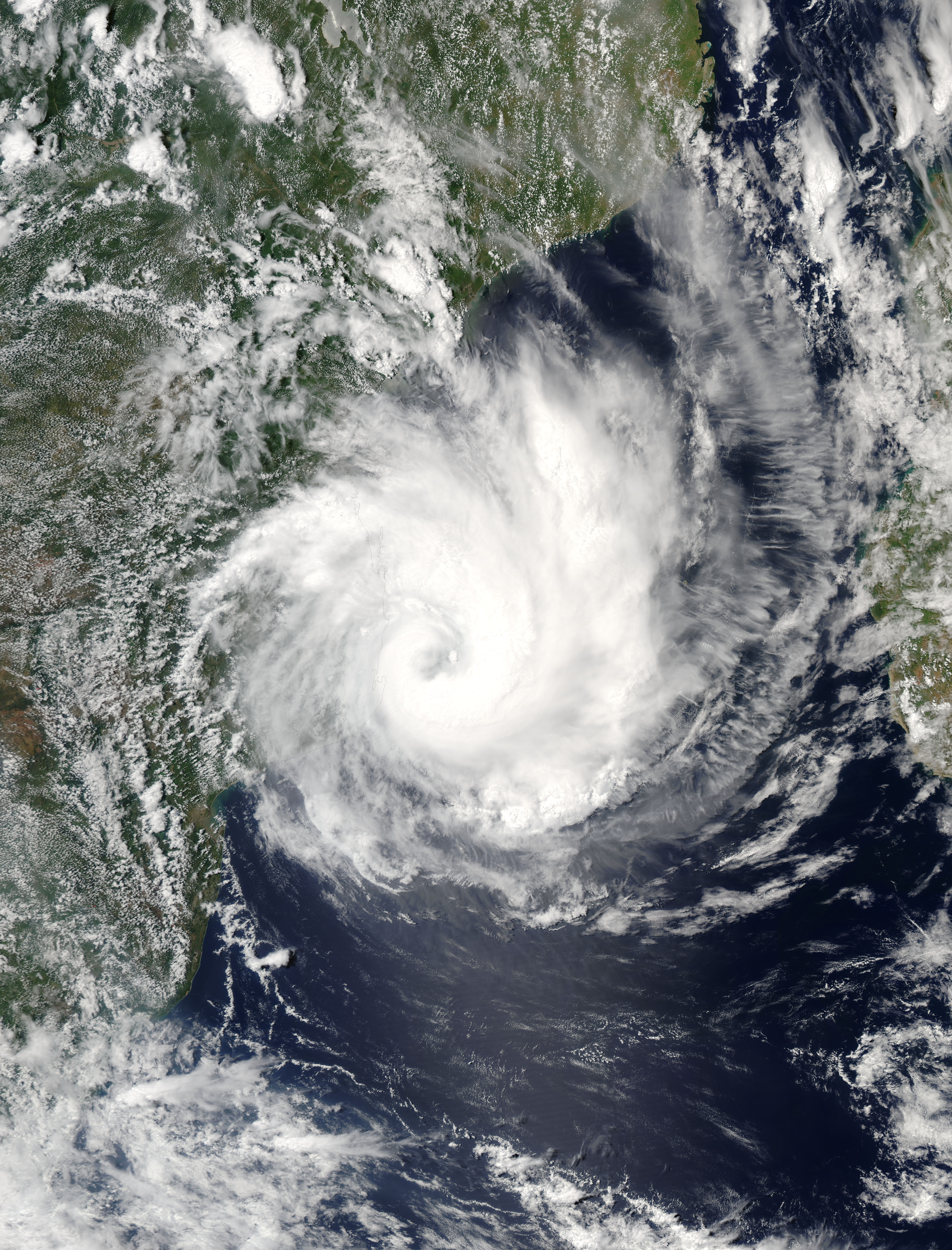
Cyclone Dineo on 15 February 2017, before making landfall in Mozambique

=== Meteorological factors ===
==== El Niño and La Niña cycles ====
The 2016-2017 floods were attributed to the La Niña phenomenon resulting in heavy rainfall and tropical cyclonic activity. It followed the 2014–2016 El Niño event which resulted in reduced rainfall and drought. This transition from severe drought conditions to excessive wet conditions led to rapidly saturated grounds.

==== Tropical cyclone ====
In February 2017, Cyclone Dineo originated from the Mozambique Channel in the Indian Ocean, with winds reaching a peak strength of 129.6 km/h. After making landfall, it hit the southeastern coast of Mozambique on 15 February with winds exceeding 100 km/h. The storm continued inland to reach Zimbabwe on 16 February, bringing heavy rains and strong winds with up to 100 mm of rain in 24 hours.

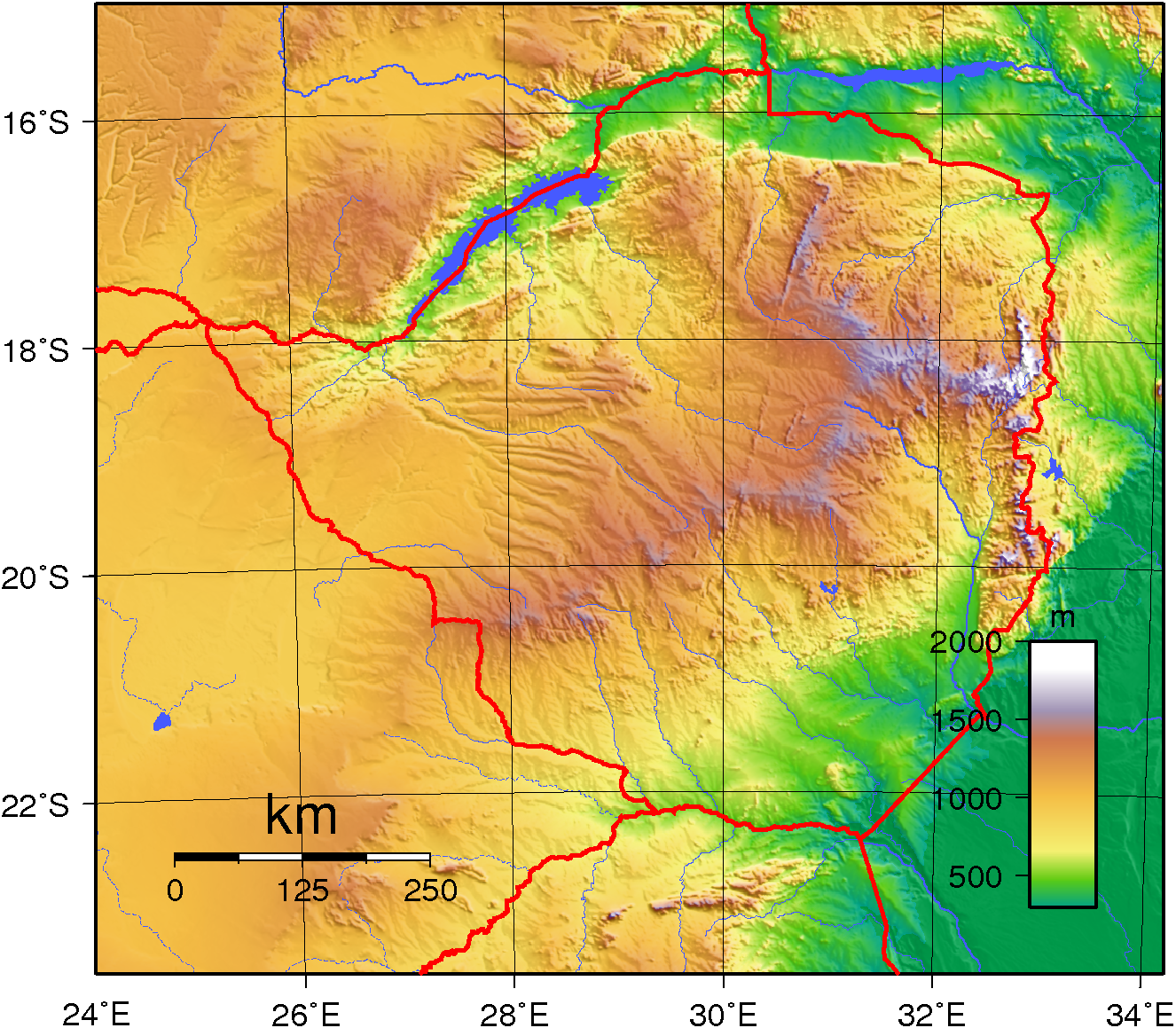
Topography of Zimbabwe

=== Geographical factors ===
==== Topography ====
A high broad plateau called the Highveld, part of the Zambezian region, crosses the spine of Zimbabwe at approximately 1,200 meters above sea level. This plateau forms a watershed with lower regions on either side. The surrounding areas slope into the Zambezi River basin to the north, the Limpopo River basin to the south, and the Save River basin to the southeast, making the low-lying regions more prone to flooding.

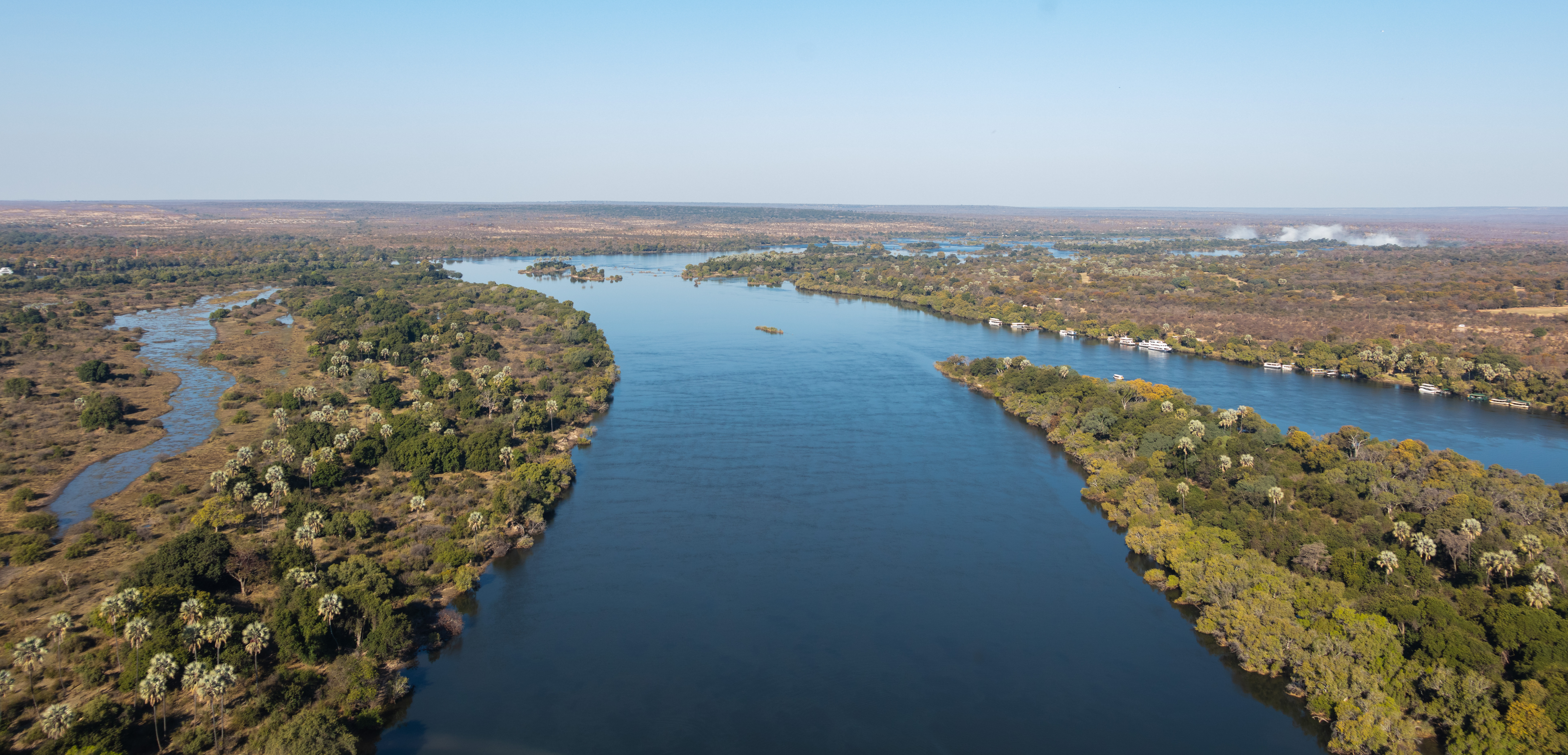
Zambezi River

==== Rivers and dams ====
Because of La Niña, many rivers and their tributaries had already received above-average rainfall, and the grounds were already saturated, leading to surface run-off. Cyclone Dineo made the situation worse, resulting in 85% of the country's dams overflowing, exacerbating the flooding situation.

==== Forests and soil ====
About 70% of the soil consists of granite-derived sandy soils that are susceptible to degradations such as leaching and erosion under heavy rains. Deforestation activities and soil degradation from farming and mining have made the country susceptible to floods by weakening the natural ability of trees to absorb water and reducing soil water retention capacity.

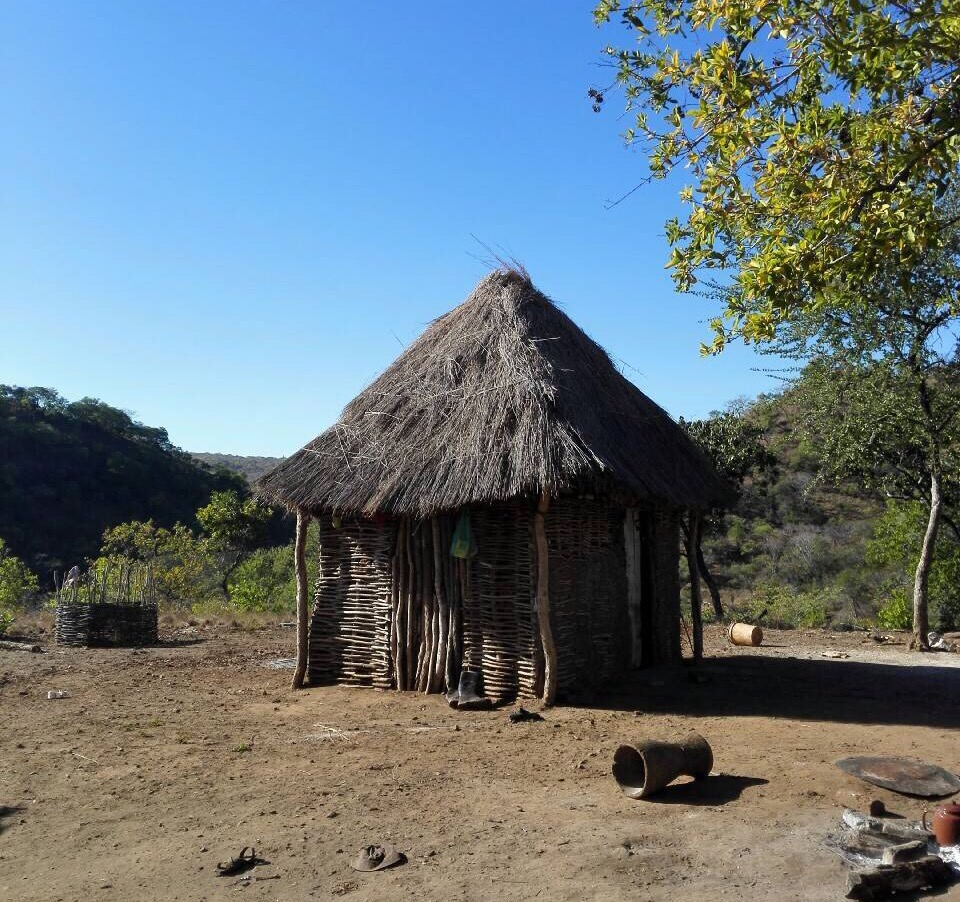
Traditional hut in rural Zimbabwe

=== Infrastructure and residential factors ===
Infrastructure such as dams, roads, bridges, or homesteads were prone to damage during heavy rains because they were old, outdated, or built with poor-quality construction materials, lacking the robustness to withstand such high volumes of water.

More than 70% of the population relies on agriculture as their primary source of income. Many reside in low-lying rural regions near rivers which offer rich soil for cultivation but are highly vulnerable to flooding.

=== Governmental factors ===
==== Early warning and preparedness ====
The government was unprepared and poorly equipped to properly respond to such a large-scale disaster due to its lack of funding, workforce, and resources, and its inability to implement climate change adaptation strategies. Early warning systems and information dissemination were insufficient because they failed to reach the most vulnerable populations in remote rural areas, which often do not have access to newspapers, television, radio, or telephones.

==== Policy ====
The Civil Protection Act (Chapter 10:06) of 1989 was the main government policy guiding disaster risk management at the time. It established the Department of Civil Protection (DCP), which was the authority responsible for coordinating disaster response and providing assistance at provincial or district levels. Its primary focus was on disaster response rather than on preparedness. In 2017, the DCP received .004% (US$286k) of the annual national budget to manage disasters.

The Disaster Risk Management Act bill was introduced in 2011, designed to ensure financial stability and structural reforms to provide the needed access to resources. However, at the time of the disaster, it was not yet approved by the legislature. Once implemented, the act reforms the nation's disaster risk management to be better in line with the Sendai Framework for Disaster Risk Reduction and provides a minimum of 1% of the national budget for disaster risk management.

== Location and population affected ==
=== Socioeconomic background ===
Zimbabwe was a lower-middle-income country with a population of 14.8 million at the time of the event in 2017 (16.7 million people in 2024). GNI per capita PPP (international) was US$2,160 with a GDP annual growth rate of 4.1%, and 30.4% living below the national poverty line.

Also in 2017, life expectancy at birth was 61 years, with 55.8 newborns out of 1,000 births dying before the age of five. Primary education was completed by 90.7% of the population. Thirty-seven percent had access to safe sanitation services, 44% had access to electricity, and 24% had access to the internet.

=== Affected regions ===
Administrative divisions of Zimbabwe

Forty-five of the country's 65 districts experienced flooding, prompting the government to declare a national disaster. Thirty-seven districts were severely affected, notably within the Matabeleland (North, West, South, and Central), Midlands, Masvingo, Mashonaland West, Manicaland, and Metropolitan provinces.

The low-lying regions of the country bore the brunt of the flooding impact, especially the Tsholotsho district in Matabeleland North, which was reported as one of the worst affected. Inadequate drainage and flat terrain contributed to flooding, as did proximity to the Gwayi River, adding vulnerability to flash floods. Extensive damage also affected regions in southern and western Zimbabwe, including Bulawayo and areas near the Mozambique border.

=== Impact on population ===
In total, about 160,000 people were affected by the floods from December 2016 through March 2017, many of whom were women and school-age children.

==== Housing and displacement ====
2,579 houses were demolished, leaving thousands homeless. Almost 2,000 were displaced within the Tsholotsho districts of Matabeleland North, of which 859 people representing 190 families were sheltered in a nearby temporary camp. They included vulnerable groups, 54% children (159 children under the age of five), 57 elderly (including eight disabled), 86 chronically ill children, and 39 children on HIV antiretroviral therapy. Poor sanitary conditions in overcrowded shelters made people more vulnerable to diseases of the respiratory system and skin. As of June 2017, all temporary shelter camp evacuees were relocated to higher ground and provided with basic shelter materials by the government.

==== Infrastructure damage ====
Breaches of 140 communities and privately owned dams caused extensive downstream infrastructure damage, especially in Matabeleland (South and North) and Midlands provinces. Roads were damaged and bridges collapsed, leaving almost all districts inaccessible.

Access to clean water, hygiene, and sanitation were severely impacted by the flood, particularly within overcrowded internally displaced persons (IDP) camps, heightening the risk of waterborne and vector-borne diseases, including cholera, typhoid, diarrhea, and malaria. Over 100,000 were without access to safe drinking water due to water infrastructure damage. Boreholes and latrines, including those at schools and healthcare facilities, were submerged and rendered unusable.

==== Impacted education ====
388 schools (287 primary and 101 secondary) were destroyed by flooding, disrupting studies and increasing stress for 166,216 children. Pupils from Mathuphula and Mahlaba primary schools were integrated at Sipepa Primary School, which had only six classrooms for 342 pupils and was quickly overcrowded.

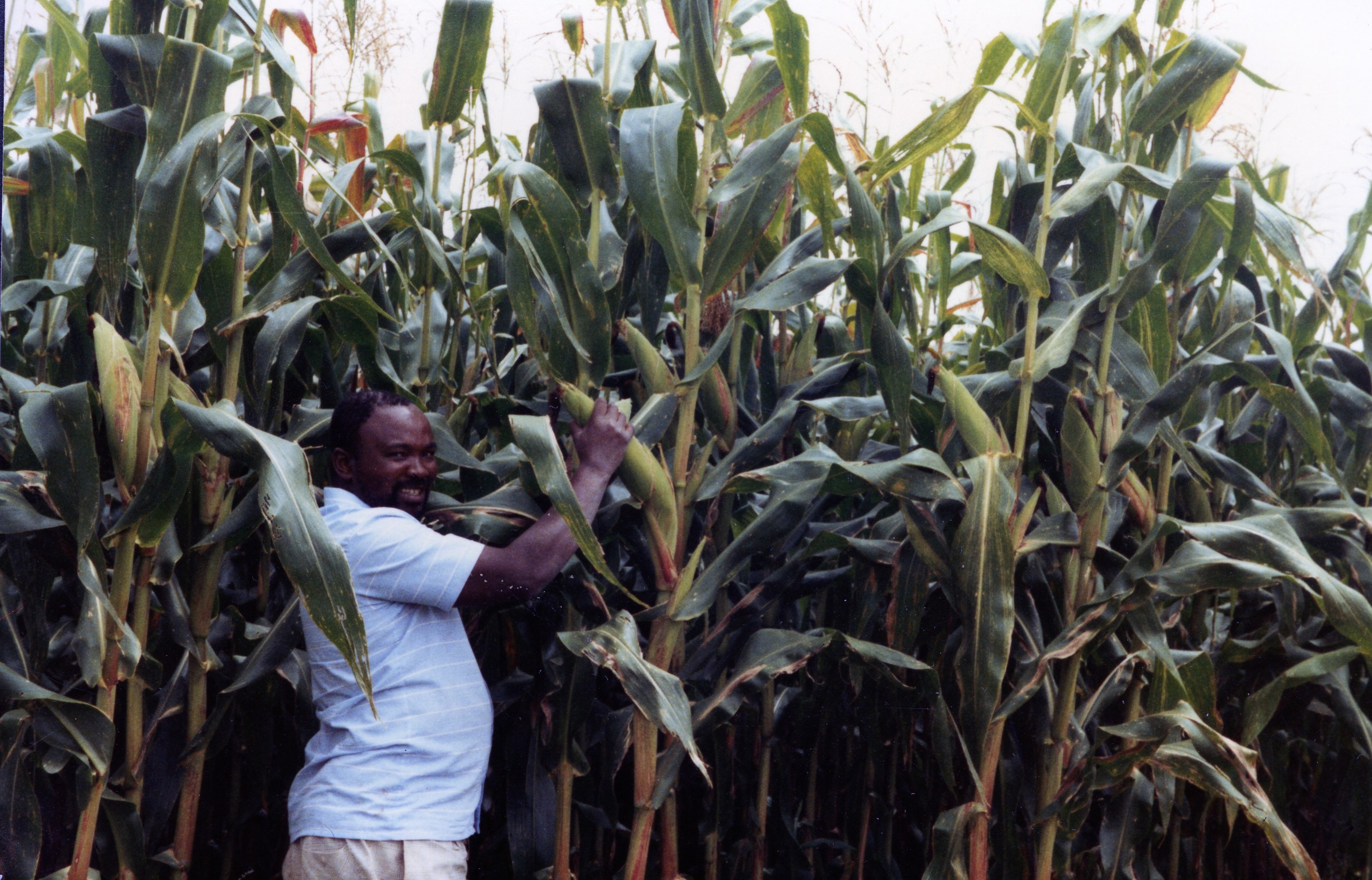
Maize farmer in Zimbabwe

==== Food insecurity ====
With agriculture forming a primary livelihood, significant losses in livestock, crops, and food supplies heavily impacted the rural population, contributing to food insecurity. Approximately 60% of the crops sown during the flood in January 2017 suffered waterlogging, leading to decreased yields. Additional livelihoods were lost due to the flooding of 90% of small-scale mines, rendering them inoperable from the disaster. The affected households relied extensively on food assistance and donations.

== Short- and long-term health impacts ==
The floods produced a number of short- and long-term health consequences impacting the physical and mental wellbeing of victims. Poor access to healthcare due to insufficient medical infrastructure was compounded by a national healthcare strike at the time of the disaster, further magnifying the negative health consequences.

=== Short-term health consequences ===
==== Physical trauma ====
The flood and landslides caused physical harm to people in the form of drowning, lightning strikes, fractures, lacerations, and other injuries. The floods resulted in 251 reported deaths and 128 injuries.

==== Waterborne diseases ====
The destruction of water supply infrastructure during the flooding allowed pathogens to contaminate water sources, increasing the burden of cholera, dysentery, typhoid, and hepatitis A. About 100,000 people were exposed to unsafe drinking water by the disaster. The Zimbabwe Ministry of Health reported 1,934 suspected and 59 confirmed typhoid cases, leading to five deaths. In March 2017, four cases of cholera were reported in Chiredzi and Chipinge districts, including two deaths due to delayed treatment. People living with disabilities were additionally burdened by a lack of health and hygiene-enabling facilities.

==== Vector-borne diseases ====
Flood waters stagnate, creating a good breeding environment for mosquitoes and increasing cases of mosquito-borne diseases. Eight flood-affected districts experienced malaria outbreaks during the disaster. 89,261 malaria cases, including 151 deaths, were reported in Zimbabwe from February through March. An increase in reported cases and deaths were blamed on flooding and poor access to healthcare facilities.

==== Burden on women and children ====
Most of the displaced people were women and children. Access to safe water and sanitation has a significant impact on women and girls, who experience difficulty with menstrual hygiene management, leading to the increased risk of disease and physical violence. Restricted water access is a double burden for women in Zimbabwe, who are culturally responsible for walking longer distances to collect and carry it to their families from safe sources. Temporary shelter accommodations are crowded, poorly lit, and lack privacy, increasing the risk of gender-based violence and sexual assault of women and children.

=== Long-term health consequences ===
==== Malnutrition ====
The disaster significantly disrupted food systems, increasing food insecurity risks already raised by the two preceding years of drought. Approximately 10% of the rural population of Zimbabwe, or 1.1 million people, were rendered food insecure with poor nutrition in 2017, resulting from the destruction of crops, death of livestock, and damage to infrastructure caused by persistent rains. Chronic malnutrition led to stunting in 26% of children under the age of five the following year.

==== Psychological stress ====
Victims interviewed three years after the disaster reported feeling anger, depression, anxiety, and helplessness resulting from personal and economic losses. Families experienced additional emotional turmoil as working-aged men out-migrated to Botswana and South Africa in search of new livelihoods, leaving women and children behind.

== Local and international response ==
The consequences faced by Zimbabwe through the 2016-2017 floods show that there were minimal mitigation and preparedness initiatives put in place for disasters, as is articulated by the Sendai Framework for Disaster Risk Reduction, to which Zimbabwe is a party. Local and international organizations responded to aid recovery for people affected by the disaster.

=== Local authorities response ===
The Department of Civil Protection took steps to assess the damage and coordinate relief mechanisms. This included establishing a National Disaster Management Committee to oversee the disaster response and recovery. The Government of Zimbabwe declared a state of national disaster on 3 March 2017, launching an appeal for humanitarian assistance, estimating that US$189 million was needed for emergency and recovery. Zimbabwe dispatched an immediate US$1 million, and allocated US$35 million more for the emergency.

=== International response ===
Various international organizations offered humanitarian assistance in response to the 2016-2017 Zimbabwean floods. These included the United Nations (UN), Government of Japan, NGOs like World Vision International, and The World Food Program. The Central Emergency Response Fund (CERF) allocated resources to support humanitarian assistance, which played a role in addressing immediate needs and filling response gaps.

International donors, including the UN (donating US$1.6m), China (US$1.06m), United Kingdom DFID (US$990k), USAID (US$300k), the European Union (US$300k), and Japan (US$50k), directed emergency response funds and goods for the response in addition to pre-existing official development assistance commitments totalling US$726m in 2017 that supported recovery.

Aid agencies provided assistance in form of camp coordination, health, education, nutrition, protection, and shelter. Furthermore, The UN coordinated relief efforts through a multi-stakeholder consultative forum composed of UN agencies, NGOs, the private sector and other donor communities. The World Food Program redirected food contributions from the drought response to the flood-affected communities. However, the destruction of roads and bridges made it difficult to deliver aid in rural areas.

== Lessons learned ==
The Government of Zimbabwe, UN agencies, NGOs, international experts, and academics studied the flooding event, disaster response, and recovery, prompting recommendations to enhance the preparedness and effectiveness of future actions.

=== Strengthen early warning systems ===
Zimbabwe's Meteorological Service Department operates an emergency warning system that broadcasts weather forecasts and emergency messages by mobile phone, radio, and newspaper. Post-disaster analyses found that warning messages are not always timely and in a language spoken by audiences, nor do they provide actionable instructions to follow. They recommend strengthening early warning systems that communicate clear emergency instructions promptly, including by SMS at no charge to receivers, that are tailored to each hazard zone and audience in an appropriate language.

=== Decentralize authority and supplies ===
Disaster risk management authority is centralized within the national Department of Civil Production, which devotes limited resources to provincial and district levels. Post-disaster analyses recommend building the capacity for disaster response within communities to enhance preparedness and recovery. Community volunteers understand local contexts and can respond quickly to help their communities recover. Pre-positioning emergency supplies, including shelters, clothing, WASH materials, medicines, and construction supplies to hazard zones, where they are most likely to be needed ahead of disasters, will improve the speed and effectiveness of response.

=== Address the needs of vulnerable populations ===
Studies found that women, children, and other vulnerable populations like the elderly and disabled were disproportionately burdened by the disaster, yet victims and responding agencies report that their needs were not adequately considered by emergency planners.

Analyses recommend that prioritization of gender issues should be considered in all aspects of disaster planning and response. These include improved privacy for women and children, distribution of sanitary kits for women in emergency supplies, more lighting and police presence in shelter camps, identification and protection of unaccompanied minors, and prioritizing nutrition and humanitarian aid provided to women, children, and other vulnerable populations.

=== Increase available budgets and resources ===
Zimbabwe's national budget does not allocate funds for disaster resource management, therefore the Department of Civil Protection must request funding annually from the treasury and on an ad-hoc basis as disasters occur. Studies report that bureaucratic process results in insufficient and delayed funding that focuses on disaster response rather than preparation, risk management, and the long-term recovery and relocation needs of affected populations. Experts recommend more guaranteed funding is necessary for disaster preparedness and response activities. Further, they suggest that the distribution of funds to local levels would further support community disaster response capacity building and engagement in preparation and post-disaster recovery.

=== Integrate disaster risk management with development ===
Reports cite breached dams as an example of economic development that amplified the disaster's effect, suggesting that integrating disaster resource management principles with development is critical for reducing vulnerabilities and fostering sustainable growth. Pre- and post-disaster analyses of Zimbabwe's disaster readiness reveal that disaster risk management techniques are not known in government ministries outside of civil protection, including those responsible for infrastructure and economic development. Experts recommend that those involved in development policymaking and planning, such as regional economists, receive training on disaster resource management, including traditional knowledge systems used by local communities, as a part of the long-term development strategy.
