= Chidhumo and Masendeke =

Zimbabwean criminal duo

Stephen Chidhumo
- Cause of death: Hanging
- Known for: Murder, armed robbery, rape and prison break

Edgar Masendeke
- Cause of death: Hanging
- Known for: Murder, armed robbery, rape and prison break

Stephen Chidhumo and Edgar Masendeke, better known as Chidhumo and Masendeke, were a Zimbabwean criminal duo who launched the only successful prison break of Chikurubhi Maximum prison.

== History ==
Chidhumo and Masendeke were hanged in 2002. They are reported to be some of the last death row prisoners to be executed in Zimbabwe after retirement of the then hangman. Chidhumo and Masendeke met at Mutimurefu Remand Prison in Masvingo in 1995 where each was serving a 16 year imprisonment sentence. Together, they planned and made an escape from prison in November 1995 along with Langton Moses Zano, Langton Charumbira, and Jameson Maverudze Musara. They overpowered and forced prison guards into the cells before walking away. The fugitives fled to Mozambique from where they launched a series of armed raids in Manicaland and Masvingo provinces for two years. They were involved in several encounters with the police but managed to evade arrest. In 1997, after two years on the run committing horrific crimes, Chidhumo was caught and arrested in Mozambique, Masendeke escaped. In August 1997, Chidhumo, however, managed to escape from Chikurubi Maximum Prison where he had been jailed and re-joined Masendeke in Mozambique. Masendeke was arrested after launch of “Operation Masendeke” by Zimbabwe Republic Police. A $60 000 reward was placed on Chidhumo’s head. His run was over after 29 days as detectives shot and arrested him in Beira.

The duo’s search captured headlines in Zimbabwe on national television, radio and newspapers with the police seeking assistance from anyone who would have known the whereabouts of Chidhumo and Masendeke.

== Stephen Chidhumo ==
Chidhumo was born in Padare Village in Zaka and he started criminal activities from teenage. According to Zaka village Headman Danda, Chidhumo was a businessman’s son. However, the businessman denied paternity, and the youngster was raised by his maternal grandfather.

He attended Rusere Primary School, dropped out at Grade Six and then went to live with an aunt in Bulawayo. Chidhumo never married and has no known children.

His mother died during his imprisonment. Some villagers say he became a criminal by association while others believe it was in his blood.

=== Arrest in 1991 ===
In 1991, Chidhumo was convicted and sentenced to 4 years for car theft. He was released in October

=== 1995 Jailbreak ===
After his release from prison, Chidhumo went on a robbery spree. He was arrested in Bulawayo in May 1995 but he escaped from police custody in Masvingo. A month later, Chidhumo was re-arrested in Mutare and was sentenced to time at Mutimurefu Prison where he met Masendeke.

In 1997, Chidhumo was arrested again in Mozambique. He was charged and found guilty on 24 counts of various crimes and was sentenced to 30 years by a Masvingo Magistrate after a Regional Magistrate, Selo Nare had sentenced him to 42 years for other offenses which he committed in Manicaland. He was sent to Chikurubi Maximum Prison to serve his sentence.

On 18 August 1997, Chidhumo escaped from Chikurubi along with three others – an ex-policeman Pedzisai Musariri, an ex-soldier Elias Chauke and Mariko Ngulube. Musariri was shot dead. Chauke was recaptured and Ngulube died from serious wounds sustained during the escape. Chidhumo managed to escape unscathed and re-joined Masendeke. They killed a prison warden in the process.

A $60,000 reward was announced for the assistance in the arrest of Chidhumo, he was arrested after 29 days and was sentenced to death.

=== Death ===
Chidhumo was executed at Chikurubi Maximum Prison in 2002.

== Edmund Masendeke ==
Masendeke's home was in Kwekwe. His father, Timothy Masendeke, who was an entrepreneur with grocery shops in Gutu and Kwekwe is said to have been abusive often beating up his children. He was also said to have been a polygamist and had more than 20 children with several women. As a young boy, Masendeke is said to have been a bully.

=== Arrest in 1995 ===
In 1995, Masendeke was arrested for murdering a woman in Masvingo and stealing her car.

While he was at Mutimurefu Remand Prison in Masvingo, Masendeke met Stephen Chidhumo in 1995. Together, they planned and made an escape from prison in November 1995.

At one point Masendeke accused his uncle of selling him out to the police and severely assaulted him and shot at his finger. Months later, Masendeke robbed him of a television set, wall clock and solar panels. He then kidnapped and later released the uncle’s worker.

=== Re-arrest in 1997 ===
Following a series of operations by the ZRP one of them particularly called "Operation Masendeke", he was arrested on his way to Chimoio near Susunhenga in Mozambique. Chidhumo was arrested two weeks later. At age 23, Masendeke pleaded guilty to 38 charges ranging from rape to murder and was sentenced to death.

=== Death ===
Masendeke was executed at Chikurubi Maximum Prison on 31 May 2002.
