= ThisFlag Movement =

Zimbabwean social and political movement

The #ThisFlag movement is a social and political movement stemming from disapproval of the falling economic conditions of Zimbabwe. The name of the hashtag originated from Pastor Evan Mawarire's 2016 online video in which he reflects over the symbolism behind the flag of Zimbabwe. Many people related to the sentiment of the video, sparking thousands of views on his video and followers in Mawarire's calls for peaceful protests against the Mugabe administration.

== Background ==
After the colony of Rhodesia became the free state of Zimbabwe in 1980, the country faced difficulties making changes to the governmental system. Zimbabwe has faced difficult economic times since the middle of the 1990s as a result of a combination of events, namely new government implemented programs, war participation, and internationally imposed export sanctions. In particular, Zimbabwe has had a strenuous relationship with the United Kingdom, which resulted in the removal of foreign aid and economic sanctions against Zimbabwe. These actions were impactful on the country's economy because agriculture and the exporting of those goods greatly contributed to Zimbabwe's GDP.

== Movement origins ==
On April 19, 2016, Mawarire posted a video to Facebook reflecting on what the Zimbabwean flag stands for and how he believes the government is not meeting those standards. His words gained traction with many people, especially the youth, leading to a 25-day online campaign in the form of videos. The citizens of Zimbabwe were able to comment on their disapprovals of the government, focusing in not only on the loss of their own aspirations but also pointing out the existing governmental corruption. On July 5, 2016, the movement continued when Mawarire urged people to boycott work by staying home. The call to stay home worked, and the government accused Mawarire of betraying Zimbabwe, which is a criminal offense in the country. Street vendors began selling flags as the movement caught on, which indirectly supported the movement. The government responded to the new symbolism of the flag by banning the wearing of the Zimbabwean flag around one's neck as Mawarire had done in his original video. Another facet of this movement was the encouragement of petitioning bond notes and calling for the removal of the cabinet minister.

== Widespread effects ==
The #ThisFlag movement has spread outside of Zimbabwe. Robert Mugabe denounced the existence of gay Zimbabweans at a United Nations conference in 2015. He specifically asserts that the acceptance of LGBTQI+ people is not African, and he relates them in his rhetoric to perverts. The marginalized LGBTQI+ community of Zimbabwe has used the momentum of the #ThisFlag movement to launch an online project called "The Tatelicious movement." This online movement specifically focuses on changing the public opinion and informing a better narrative for transgender people in Zimbabwe.
