= Engelbert Rugeje =

Zimbabwean politician and military officer

Rtd. Lieutenant General Engelbert Rugeje

National Political Commissar for ZANU-PF
- Incumbent
- Assumed office 15 December 2017
- President: Emmerson Mnangagwa
- Preceded by: Saviour Kasukuwere

Chief of Staff of the Zimbabwe National Army
- President: Robert Mugabe

Personal details
- Party: ZANU-PF

Military service
- Allegiance: Zimbabwe
- Branch/service: Zimbabwe National Army
- Rank: Lieutenant General

Engelbert Rugeje (born c. 1962) is a Zimbabwean politician and retired general officer who was the ZANU-PF national political commissar from December 2017 to 2018. He was the Chief of Staff of the Zimbabwe National Army (ZNA) until 2017. He was a prominent figure in the 2017 Zimbabwean coup d'état attempt. In December 2017 he was promoted from major general to lieutenant general upon retirement and admitted into ZANU-PF.

== History ==
He was born in Charamba village, located in the district of Bikita, Zimbabwe. Rugeje is also an heir of the Charamba family. The Charamba family belong to the Zimbabwean Duma clan which, in turn, traces its origins back to the Rozvi kingdom. Rugeje was educated at Silveira Mission where he excelled.

== Military service ==
He joined the Zimbabwe African National Liberation Army (ZANLA) as a teenager at the age of 16, serving as a partisan. Taking the moniker of "Sunbat", he rose within the ranks of ZANLA to become a member of the movement's general staff.

After the end of the Rhodesian Bush War, Rugeje was offered the rank of major in the new Zimbabwe Defence Forces. He was promoted to lieutenant colonel in 1983, and was made a colonel in 1987. Rugeje led a portion of the Zimbabwean military to quash the Zimbabwe People's Revolutionary Army (ZIPRA) rebellion in Matabeleland from 1983 to 1987. This was whilst he was the commander at Inkomo Barracks (the primary unit under his command being the First Mechanised Battalion). Rugeje ultimately led ZNA forces to victory over the ZIPRA. Rugeje was also successful in leading missions against the Mozambique National Resistance (RENAMO) when he was commander of One Commando Battalion (currently known as One Commando Regiment or simply "One Commando"). Around 1984, under Rugeje's leadership, One Commando assisted other elements of the Zimbabwean military in defeating most elements of the RENAMO.

In 1990 he was promoted to brigadier general and became quartermaster of the ZNA. In the mid to late 1990s he was actively involved in the Democratic Republic of Congo mission, in which he led successful counter insurgency missions. Rugeje graduated from Lancaster University with both a Master of Defence & Strategic Studies degree, and a Master of Laws degree. Major General Rugeje also holds a Master of Business Administration degree from Harvard University.

In 2000 he was promoted to major general, becoming the fourth in command of the Zimbabwe Defence Forces.

On October 24, 2006 he praised cooperation between the military of Zimbabwe and the Chinese People's Liberation Army.

On 18 December 2017, Rugeje was promoted to lieutenant general upon retirement by President Emmerson Mnangagwa.

== Involvement in coup d'état ==
Rugeje, ZNA spokesman Ben Ncube, and Air Vice-Marshal Elson Moyo were supposedly arrested on June 7, 2007 along with almost 400 soldiers for allegedly plotting to overthrow the Mugabe administration. Rugeje was called the "brains" of the attempted coup d'état.

== Controversy ==
In September 2012, Rugeje was accused of seizing land meant for Zimbabwe's conservation efforts for himself; along with other high-ranking military, political, and social figures. President Mugabe ordered all seized land to be evicted, and scolded those involved, calling them "greedy".

As of July 2014, Rugeje had still not vacated all (if any) of the aforementioned seized land. The Zimbabwean government began placing pressure on Rugeje, by denying him a hunting license. The particular type of hunting license he had requested would have allowed him to permit hunters, particularly foreign trophy-hunters, to hunt on and around the land he had seized. Ostensibly, Rugeje could make a profit through this, by charging for the right to hunt on the land, or by other related means. The Zimbabwean government took such an action as to make the land less profitable for Rugeje, thereby enticing him to abandon said land. At the time of this writing (January 2015) it is not known whether the pressure by the Zimbabwe government has encouraged Rugeje to leave the seized land.
