= Harare Institute of Technology =

Zimbabwean university offering courses mainly in technology

Harare Institute of Technology (HIT)
- Motto: Success Through Innovation
- Type: Public
- Established: 1988
- Vice-Chancellor: Engineer Quinton C Kanhukamwe
- Location: Harare, Zimbabwe; 17.838°S 31.008°E
- Campus: Urban
- Website: www.hit.ac.zw

Harare Institute of Technology (HIT) is a Zimbabwean university offering courses mainly in technology.

== History ==
The Harare Institute of Technology (HIT) was established in 1988 as a National Vocational Training Centre (NVTC). Over time, it evolved into a Technical College offering courses in automotive, electrical, and mechanical engineering, producing artisans capable of operating and maintaining machinery in industry with little or no research or generation of new technology related knowledge.

HIT conducts research, design, manufacture, develop, incubate, transfer, and commercialize technology for all sectors of the economy.

HIT was granted degree awarding status in 2005 with the promulgation of the Harare Institute of Technology Act {Chapter 25:26}. Harare Institute of Technology is the hub of technology development and delivery of technology programmes at undergraduate and postgraduate level. Programs offered are Bachelor of Technology (B.Tech)Honours Degrees which include: B.Tech Hons Electronic Engineering B.Tech Hons Computer Science B.Tech Hons Software Engineering Bachelor of Pharmacy Honours (B.Pharm) B.Tech Hons E-Commerce B.Tech Hons Financial Engineering; B.Tech Hons Chemical Process Systems Engineering; B.Tech Hons Industrial and Manufacturing Engineering; B.Tech Hons Electronic Engineering; B.Tech Hons Biotechnology; B.tech Hons Food Processing Technology B.Tech Hons Information Technology; B.Tech Hons Information Security and Assurance The University has the second School of Pharmacy after University of Zimbabwe.The Pharmacy programme at H.I.T is unique as it touches at the production and processing of drugs, as well as the clinical aspects of Pharmacy. The programme meets the WHO guidelines in the Health Sector The school of Pharmacy was established in 2011 after approval from the Ministry of Health and the Pharmacists Council of Zimbabwe (PCZ). The school Chairman of the School of Pharmacy currently is Professor Mazuru Gundidza, who is in the Pharmaceutical field and has over 32 years in the Pharmaceutical Industry.

== Notable alumni ==
- Evan Mawarire (1996), pastor and democratic activist
