= Elson Moyo =

Zimbabwean air officer

Commander of the Air Force of Zimbabwe
- In office 18 December 2017 – 15 March 2024
- President: Emmerson Mnangagwa
- Preceded by: Shebba Shumbayaonda (Acting)
- Succeeded by: John Jacob Nzvede

Chief of Staff for Joint Operations and Plans of the Zimbabwe Defence Forces
- President: Emmerson Mnangagwa; Robert Mugabe

Deputy Commander of the Air Force of Zimbabwe
- In office 30 October 2003 – 2007
- President: Robert Mugabe

Military service
- Allegiance: Zimbabwe
- Branch/service: Air Force of Zimbabwe
- Rank: Air Marshal

Air Marshal Elson Moyo is a retired Zimbabwean air officer who served as Commander of the Air Force of Zimbabwe from December 2017 to March 2024 and was one of the main figures in the 2017 Zimbabwean coup d'état attempt. In 2003 he was promoted from air commodore to air vice-marshal by former president Robert Mugabe.

== Early life and education ==
Moyo was born in Mberengwa. In 1977, when he was a student at Manama Secondary School, Moyo together with his cousin SB Moyo left school and joined the liberation struggle via Botswana.

== Career ==
Moyo was one of the first blacks to receive full training as a pilot together with retired Air Marshal Shebba Shumbayaonda. However, the two had to be trained outside the country because the Rhodesian government worked to block black Africans from becoming pilots.

After Zimbabwe gained independence, Moyo was a flying instructor at Thornhill Airbase in Gweru. During this time he trained many pilots who went on to become senior officers in the AFZ. Moyo was promoted from air commodore to air vice-marshal in November 2003. In early 2007, he held the post of Chief of Staff - Operations. Unlike former Air Force Commander, Perrance Shiri and the other high-ranking AFZ officers, Moyo is able to fly an aircraft and as such he commanded a degree of personal loyalty from those senior officers whom he instructed during their flying training.

Moyo is an accomplished pilot, who in 2011, had 1970 hours flying time in the following aircraft: Hunter, SF260M, SF260TP, Hawk, MIG 15, L29, MF1-17 and T-37.

From October 2003 to 2007, Moyo was the Deputy Commander of the Air Force of Zimbabwe.

In December 2017, Moyo was appointed Commander of the Air Force of Zimbabwe and his military rank was upgraded from air vice-marshal to air marshal by President Emmerson Mnangagwa. In March 2024, Moyo was replaced by John Jacob Nzvede as Air Force Commander.

== Death escape ==
Following what were reported as clashes with Shiri, in March 2007 Moyo had become critically ill as a result of suspected poisoning. He later recovered.

== Controversy ==
Moyo was arrested on 7 June 2007 along with Major General Engelbert Rugeje and around 400 other military personnel for allegedly plotting to overthrow the Mugabe administration. It was later noted that Moyo was under 24-hour surveillance and had been removed from his public roles. In 2015, Moyo was still in military service and reported to be the Chief of Staff for Joint Operation and Plans.

Elson Moyo achieved some notoriety after he was sued for allegedly committing adultery with the wife of a policeman.
