= Economic repression =

Economic repression comprises various actions to restrain certain economical activities or social groups involved in economic activities. It contrasts with economic liberalization. Economists note widespread economic repression in developing countries.

== Goals ==
The main goal of economic repression is protectionism, the instruments for which include fines and ceilings on interest rates or exchange rates.

== Examples ==
A common type of economic repression against individuals is blacklisting.
