= Subdivisions of Zimbabwe =

Administrative areas

Zimbabwe has a centralised government and is divided for administrative purposes into eight provinces and two cities with provincial status. Each province has a provincial capital from where official business is usually carried out.

Administrative divisions of Zimbabwe

Province	Capital	Population (2022)
Bulawayo	Bulawayo	665,952
Harare	Harare	1,491,740
Manicaland	Mutare	2,037,762
Mashonaland Central	Bindura	1,384,891
Mashonaland East	Marondera	1,731,173
Mashonaland West	Chinhoyi	1,893,584
Masvingo	Masvingo	1,638,528
Matabeleland North	Lupane	827,645
Matabeleland South	Gwanda	760,345
Midlands	Gweru	1,811,905

The names of most of the provinces were derived from the divide between Mashonaland and Matabeleland at the time of colonisation: Mashonaland was the territory governed first by the British South Africa Company Pioneer Column, and Matabeleland the territory conquered during the First Matabele War. These correspond roughly to the precolonial territories of the Shona people and the Matabele people, although there are significant ethnic minorities in most provinces. Each province is headed by a Provincial Governor, appointed by the President. The provincial government is run by a Provincial Administrator, appointed by the Public Service Commission. Other government functions at provincial level are carried out by provincial offices of national government departments.

The provinces are subdivided into 59 districts and 1,200 wards (sometimes referred to as municipalities). Each district is headed by a District Administrator, appointed by the Public Service Commission. There is also a Rural District Council, which appoints a Chief Executive Officer. The Rural District Council comprises elected ward councillors, the District Administrator and one representative of the chiefs (traditional leaders appointed under customary law) in the district. Other government functions at district level are carried out by district offices of national government departments.

The wards are not merely electoral wards, but have some administrative functions of their own: at ward level there is a Ward Development Committee, comprising the elected ward councillor, the kraalheads (traditional leaders subordinate to chiefs) and representatives of Village Development Committees. Wards are subdivided into villages, each of which has an elected Village Development Committee and a Headman (traditional leader subordinate to the kraalhead).
