= Evan Mawarire =

Zimbabwean human rights activist and pastor

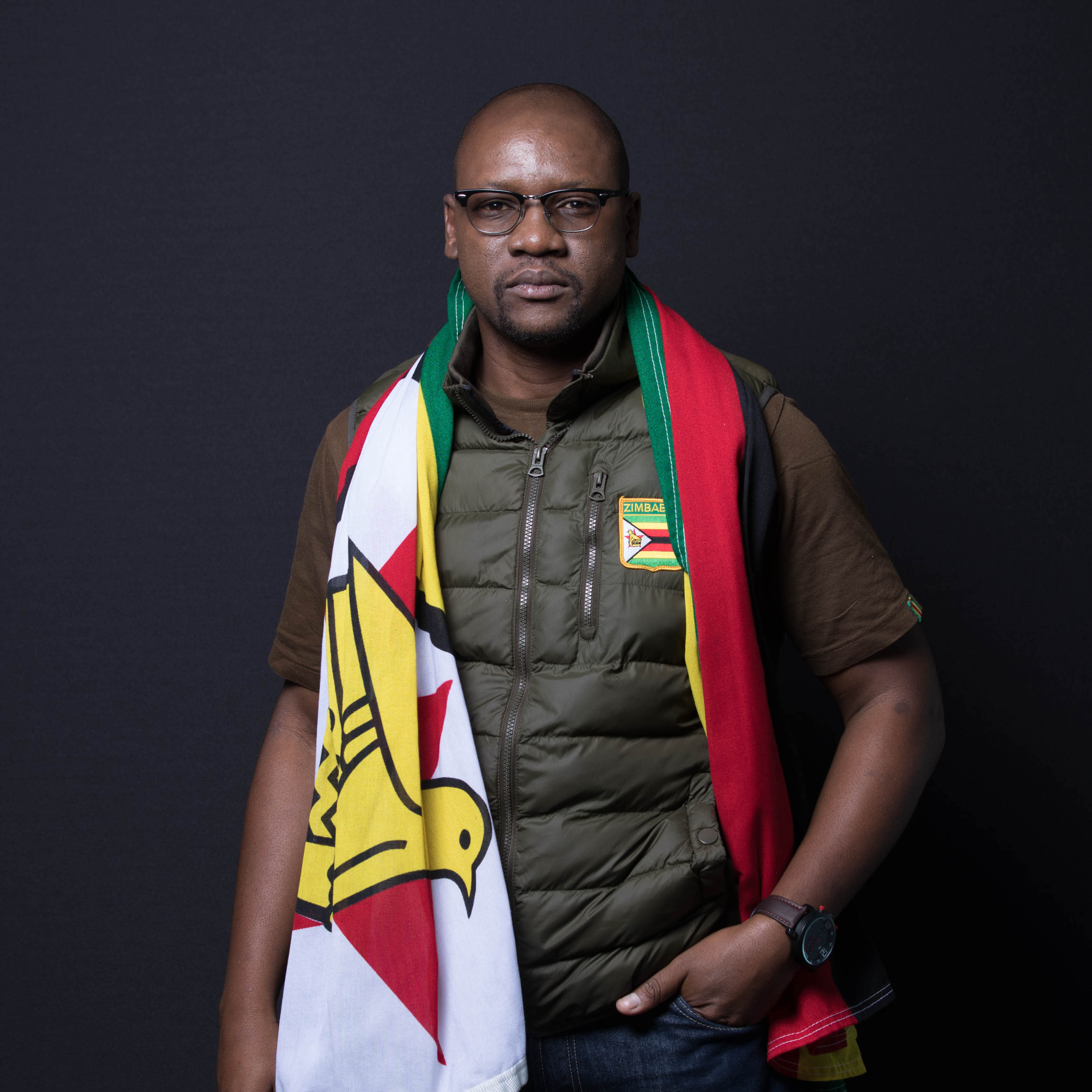
- Born: Evan Mawarire; 7 March 1977 (age 49); Rhodesia (now Zimbabwe)
- Occupations: Pastor; democratic activist
- Years active: 2016-present as a political figure
- Known for: 2016–17 Zimbabwe protests; #ThisFlag; opposition to Robert Mugabe
- Spouse: Samantha Mawarire
- Children: 3

Evan Mawarire (born 7 March 1977) is a Zimbabwean pastor and democratic activist. He came to prominence during the 2016–17 Zimbabwe protests that challenged the rule of Robert Mugabe’s government. It was reported that Mawarire urged the people of Zimbabwe to remain defiant and refuse to return to work after the protests. In late 2017, it was reported by BBC News that Mawarire was acquitted by a Zimbabwe court where he faced a potential 20-year prison sentence if convicted for allegedly trying to overthrow Robert Mugabe. Thousands turned up at his hearing sparking a spontaneous social movement that challenged corruption, injustice and poverty. On 13 July 2017 at least 150 lawyers stood up in court to represent Mawarire, while thousands amassed outside a Harare courthouse.

== Early life and education ==
His parents were civil servants and he was raised in a Christian household. He spent his early childhood in Harare, before moving to Mashonaland West Province. He attended Amandas Primary School in the town of Concession. From 1990 to 1992, he attended Prince Edward School in Harare, before transferring to Charles Clack High School in Magunje, a Salvation Army mission school, to complete his education from 1993 to 1994. At age 16, he was elected to Zimbabwe's child parliament, which was created to celebrate the International Day of the African Child. He was also elected child President of Zimbabwe. He went on to study at the Harare Institute of Technology, where he earned an Auto Electrician diploma in 1996.

== Career ==
He worked in business for a number of years, while at the same time volunteering at his church, teaching Sunday school. He found the work at his church more fulfilling, and in 2002 he quit his job and went to Bible college. From 2002 to 2007, he was the young adult and youth pastor at Celebration Churches International in Harare, before serving as the church's regional director in the United Kingdom from 2007 to 2010. In 2010, he established his own church, His Generation Church, in Harare.

== #ThisFlag movement ==
#ThisFlag, is a democracy movement in Zimbabwe that was founded by Mawarire with the intention of removing the government of president Robert Mugabe. The movement was also considered by some as the most influential civilian-led political movement in Zimbabwe's history. Martin Runganga, a detective in Zimbabwe's criminal investigations department likened Mawarire to Boko Haram stating that he (Mawarire) is brainwashing the people of Zimbabwe through religion similarly to Boko Haram. Some in Zimbabwe compared the movement that of Martin Luther King Jr.'s civil rights movement. The Herald, a Zimbabwean state-owned newspaper, claimed that Mawarire was a fraudster who conned church goers from his church based in United Kingdom so as to evade tax.

=== Arrests ===
In July 2016, Mawarire was arrested on charges of inciting violence in Zimbabwe and the Zimbabwe Republic Police seized his phone. On 1 February 2017, Mawarire was arrested in connection with a charge of trying to overthrow Robert Mugabe at the Robert Gabriel Mugabe International Airport in Zimbabwe on his way back from the United States. In June 2017, Mawarire was arrested for praying with protesting students of the University of Zimbabwe. In September 2017, Mawarire was arrested for citing Zimbabwe's economic problems by the Zimbabwe Republic Police at his church. Pastor Evan Mawarire was arrested again on 16 January 2019 after calling for and organising a national boycott against rising cost of living and misgovernance. Under the new president Emmerson Mnangagwa, Mawarire was charged with subversion.

=== Zimbabwean politics ===
Shortly after Morgan Tsvangirai's death it was reported that Mawarire considered Tsvangirai to be a significant player in Zimbabwe's post-independence legacy as he challenged Mugabe's rule from the outside, different from his predecessors. Shortly after Robert Mugabe's 94th birthday while at the Geneva Summit for Human Rights and Democracy, Mawarire voiced his skepticism on Zimbabwe's 2018 election being free and fair. It is uncertain whether Mawarire contemplates running for the Zimbabwean presidency but he has ruled out any prospects. In late March 2018, Mawarire announced that he would be running for a local government position in Harare.

=== Global image ===
Forbes published an article on how Mawarire came from obscurity to becoming a well-known human rights activist using the internet to fight for democracy. Foreign Policy magazine named him as one of 100 top thinkers of 2016. The Daily Maverick of South Africa named him African person of the year in 2016. In 2017, the Index on Censorship nominated him as a finalist for the freedom of expression awards 2017. Evan Mawarire is an alumnus of the Stanford University Draper Hills Fellowship for Democracy Development and the Rule of Law (CDDRL). In 2020, he was selected by Yale University as a Yale World Fellow, a signature global leadership development initiative that connects and trains a group of exemplary practitioners from a wide range of fields. In 2023, he was invited by the Georgetown School of Foreign Service to be one of the three commencement speakers, along with Daria Navalnaya and Debra Tice.

== Personal life ==
Mawarire and his wife Samantha have three children.
