= Results of the 2018 Zimbabwean general election =

- 30 July 2018
- Presidential election
- Registered: 5,695,936 (▼3.30%)
- Turnout: 85.19%
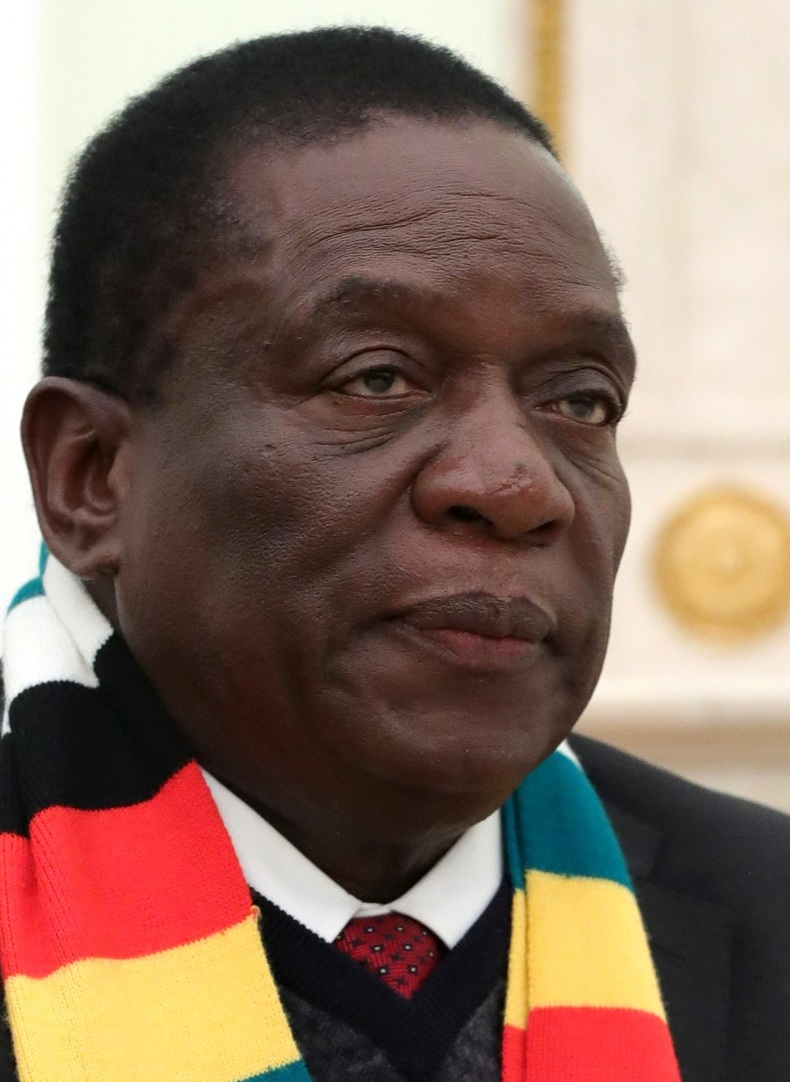

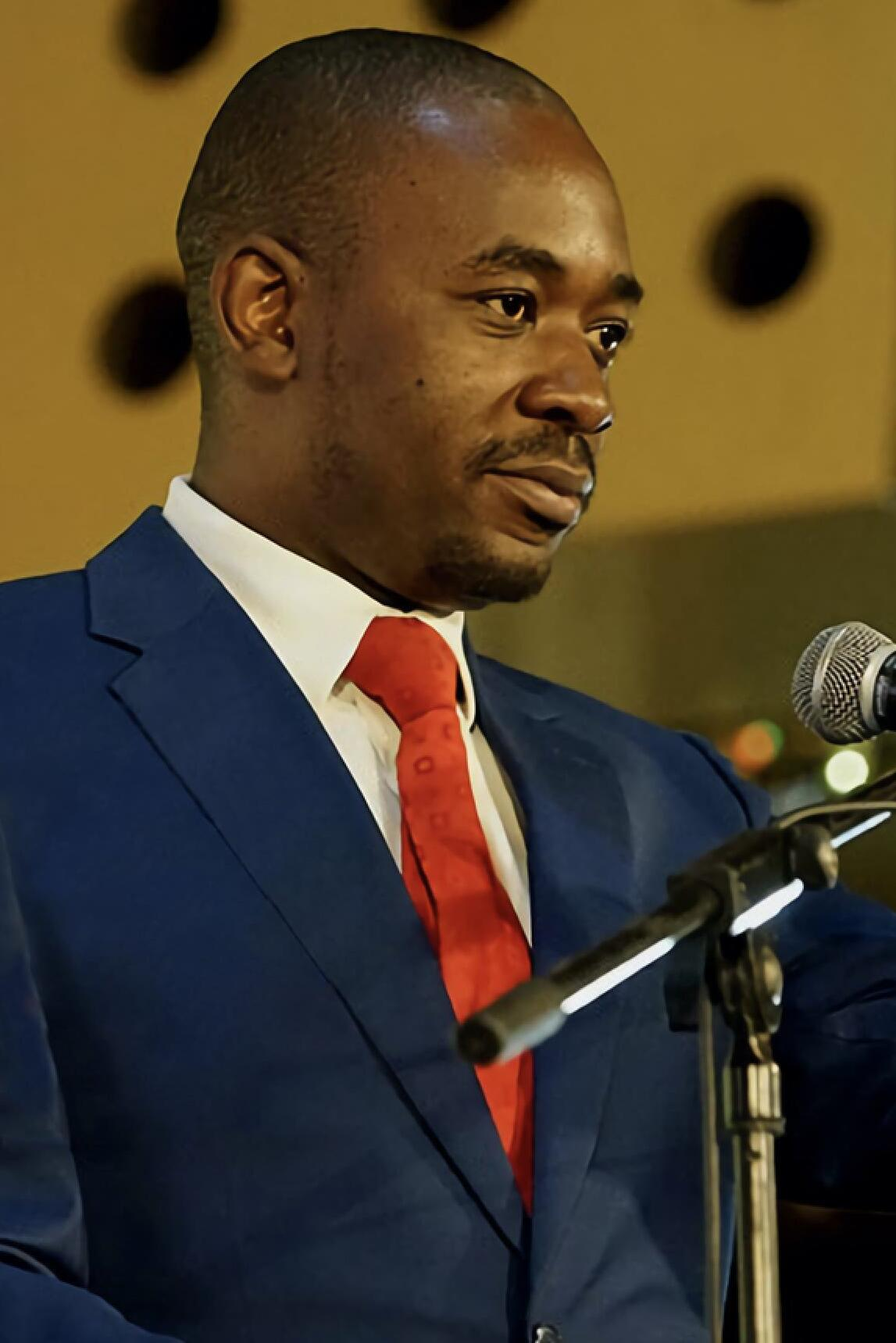
Candidate	Emmerson Mnangagwa	Nelson Chamisa
Party	ZANU–PF	MDC Alliance
Popular vote	2,461,745	2,150,343
Percentage	51.50%	44.99%
President before election
Emmerson Mnangagwa
ZANU–PF
Elected President
Emmerson Mnangagwa
ZANU–PF
- National Assembly
- All 270 seats in the National Assembly; 136 seats needed for a majority
Party	Leader	Vote %	Seats	+/–
ZANU–PF	Emmerson Mnangagwa	52.36	178	−18
MDC Alliance	Nelson Chamisa	34.62	89	New
MDC-T	Thokozani Khuphe	3.04	1	−69
NPF	Eunice Sandi Moyo	1.13	1	New
Independents	Temba Mliswa	5.08	1	−1
This lists parties that won seats. See the complete results below.
- Senate
- 60 of the 80 seats in the Senate; 41 seats needed for a majority
Party	Leader	Seats	+/–
ZANU–PF	Emmerson Mnangagwa	35	−2
MDC Alliance	Nelson Chamisa	24	New
MDC-T	Thokozani Khupe	1	−20
This lists parties that won seats. See the complete results below.
- Maps

The 2018 Zimbabwean general election was held in Zimbabwe on 30 July 2018 for the presidency and to set the membership of the 9th Parliament, consisting of the Senate and National Assembly.

== Presidential election ==
The results of the Presidential election were announced on 2 August 2018 – 3 days after the election – by the Honourable Mrs Justice Priscilla Makanyara Chigumba, spokesperson for the Zimbabwe Electoral Commission (ZEC). The following day, Nelson Chamisa, leader of the MDC Alliance called the results "fake", stating that they would not accept "this fiction" and that the party would "pursue all means necessary – legal and constitutional – to make sure that [they] protect the people's vote".

In the days that followed, there were protests by members of the MDC Alliance. The army opened fire on demonstrators and bystanders killing six people. Many opposition supporters were arrested, according to opposition leaders and human rights groups.

On 10 August, it was announced that Mnangagwa's inauguration, which had been scheduled for 12 August, would be delayed after Chamisa petitioned to challenge the election results in the Constitutional Court of Zimbabwe, with a ruling due by the end of the month.

ZEC published ten Excel spreadsheets on their website, breaking down the presidential results by constituency with the results broken down by polling station - 10,985 polling stations in total. By 17 August, the Zimbabwe Election Support Network (ZESN) had analysed these constituency results and identified that 365 pieces of information were missing. The ZESN also identified duplicate polling stations as well as 12 polling stations that had duplicate results with nearby polling stations. Additionally, there were 10 polling stations that had a turnout of 100% or more, the most notable being Chiredzi Town Council Ward 7, which reported a turnout of 182.7%. However, in spite of the many errors identified by the ZESN, they concluded that, "The files are not without errors. But these are relatively few in number to systematically benefit any candidate."

On 24 August the Constitutional Court of Zimbabwe handed down the judgment in Chamisa's challenge of the results. The judgment of the court also acknowledged that there had been errors in the figures supplied by ZEC both before and after the election. One such error pertained to the number of registered voters, which had been declared before the election to be 5,695,706 but which was in fact 5,695,936 due to 230 voters who had been registered during a BVR registration exercise in Chegutu, Mashonaland West Province, prior to the cut-off date for the registration of voters. The Court ultimately declared that

The correction of the mathematical errors in the number of the votes announced as having been received by the first respondent by the Commission had no effect at all on the result of the Presidential election and the declaration of the first respondent [Mnangagwa] to be duly elected as President of the Republic of Zimbabwe.

Emmerson Mnangwa was duly sworn in as President of Zimbabwe on 26 August at the National Sports Stadium in Harare.

By 31 August, ZEC had amended the ten spreadsheets that broke down the presidential election results by polling station, correcting many of the errors that the ZESN had identified, although the final totals in summary at the bottom of each sheet still contained some tabulation errors, where certain cells had been left out of the final totals.

=== Summary of results ===
Presidential election results by constituency Emmerson Mnangagwa Nelson Chamisa

Candidate	Party	Announced by ZEC on 2 August 2023		ZESN analysis of constituency results at 17 August 2018		Amended ZEC constituency results at 31 August 2018		Difference between final tabulation and declared results	
Candidate	Party	Votes	%	Votes	%	Votes	%	Votes	%
Emmerson Mnangagwa	ZANU-PF	2,460,463	51.52	2,455,559	51.43	2,461,745	51.50	1,282	0.05
Nelson Chamisa	MDC Alliance	2,147,436	44.97	2,151,620	45.06	2,150,343	44.99	2,907	0.14
Thokozani Khupe	MDC–T	45,573	0.95	45,607	0.96	45,582	0.95	9	0.02
Joseph Makamba Busha	FreeZim Congress	17,556	0.37	17,536	0.37	17,551	0.37	-5	-0.03
Nkosana Moyo	Alliance for People's Agenda	15,223	0.32	15,233	0.32	15,235	0.32	12	0.08
Evaristo Chikanga	Rebuild Zimbabwe	13,141	0.28	13,152	0.28	13,140	0.27	-1	-0.01
Joice Mujuru	People's Rainbow Coalition	12,878	0.27	12,830	0.27	12,885	0.27	7	0.05
Hlabangana Kwanele	Republican Party of Zimbabwe	9,449	0.20	9,453	0.20	9,457	0.20	8	0.08
Blessing Kasiyamhuru	Zimbabwe Partnership for Prosperity	7,022	0.15	7,030	0.15	7,014	0.15	-8	-0.11
William Mugadza	Bethel Christian Party	5,890	0.12	5,900	0.12	5,894	0.12	4	0.07
Divine Mhambi	National Alliance of Patriotic and Democratic Republicans	4,980	0.10	4,974	0.10	4,980	0.10	0	0.00
Peter Wilson	Democratic Opposition Party	4,898	0.10	4,900	0.10	4,899	0.10	1	0.02
Peter Munyanduri	New Patriotic Front	4,529	0.09	4,534	0.09	4,533	0.09	4	0.09
Ambrose Mutinhiri	National Patriotic Front	4,107	0.09	4,102	0.09	4,107	0.09	0	0.00
Daniel Shumba	United Democratic Alliance	3,907	0.08	3,906	0.08	3,907	0.08	0	0.00
Peter Gava	United Democratic Front	2,867	0.06	2,863	0.06	2,867	0.06	0	0.00
Brian Mteki	Independent	2,747	0.06	2,748	0.06	2,749	0.06	2	0.07
Lovemore Madhuku	National Constitutional Assembly	2,738	0.06	2,702	0.06	2,699	0.06	-39	-1.42
Noah Ngoni Manyika	Build Zimbabwe Alliance	2,678	0.06	2,682	0.06	2,683	0.06	5	0.19
Elton Mangoma	Coalition of Democrats	2,437	0.05	2,434	0.05	2,436	0.05	-1	-0.04
Melbah Dzapasi	#1980 Freedom Movement Zimbabwe	1,899	0.04	1,891	0.04	1,893	0.04	-6	-0.32
Violet Mariyacha	United Democracy Movement	1,673	0.04	1,674	0.04	1,674	0.04	1	0.06
Timothy Chiguvare	People's Progressive Party Zimbabwe	1,549	0.03	1,547	0.03	1,549	0.03	0	0.00
Total		4,775,640	100.00	4,774,877	100.00	4,779,822	100.00	4,182	0.09
Valid votes		4,775,640	98.51	4,774,877	98.51	4,779,822	98.51	4,182	0.09
Invalid/blank votes		72,358	1.49	72,288	1.49	72,406	1.49	48	0.07
Total votes		4,847,998	100.00	4,847,165	100.00	4,852,228	100.00	4,230	0.09
Registered voters/turnout		5,695,706	85.12	5,695,706	85.10	5,695,936	85.19	230	0.00

=== Results by province ===
Results by province
Province	Joseph Makamba Busha		Nelson Chamisa		Everisto Washington Chikanga		Melbah Dzapasi		Peter Mapfumo Gava		Kwanele Hlabangana		Blessing Kasiyamhuru		Thokozani Khupe		Lovemore Madhuku		Elton Steers Mangoma		Noah Ngoni Manyika		Chiguvare Tonderayi Johannes Timothy Mapfumo		Violet Mariyacha		Divine Mhambi-Hove		Emmerson Dambudzo Mnangagwa		Donald Nkosana Moyo		Bryn Taurai Mteki		Willard Tawonezvi Mugadza		Joice Teurai Ropa Mujuru		Tenda Peter Munyanduri		Ambrose Mutinhiri		Kuzozvirava Doniel Shumba		Peter Harry Wilson		Total Votes Rejected		Ballot Paper Unaccounted for	Total Votes Cast	Total Valid Votes Cast	Voter Population	Voter Turnout %
Province	FreeZim Congress		MDC Alliance		Rebuild Zimbabwe		#1980 Freedom Movement Zimbabwe		United Democratic Front		Republican Party of Zimbabwe		Zimbabwe Partnership for Prosperity		MDC-Tsvangirai		National Constitutional Assembly		Coalition of Democrats		Build Zimbabwe Alliance		People's Progressive Party Zimbabwe		United Democracy Movement		National Alliance of Patriotic and Democratic Republicans		ZANU-PF		Alliance for the People's Agenda		Independent		Bethel Christian Party		People's Rainbow Coalition		New Patriotic Front		National Patriotic Front		United Democratic Alliance		Democratic Opposition Party		Total Votes Rejected		Ballot Paper Unaccounted for	Total Votes Cast	Total Valid Votes Cast	Voter Population	Voter Turnout %
Province	Votes	%	Votes	%	Votes	%	Votes	%	Votes	%	Votes	%	Votes	%	Votes	%	Votes	%	Votes	%	Votes	%	Votes	%	Votes	%	Votes	%	Votes	%	Votes	%	Votes	%	Votes	%	Votes	%	Votes	%	Votes	%	Votes	%	Votes	%	Votes	%	Ballot Paper Unaccounted for	Total Votes Cast	Total Valid Votes Cast	Voter Population	Voter Turnout %
Bulawayo	497	0.23	144,107	66.90	364	0.17	94	0.04	78	0.04	442	0.21	320	0.15	5,753	2.67	81	0.04	60	0.03	104	0.05	45	0.02	65	0.03	57	0.03	60,168	27.93	1,350	0.63	68	0.03	231	0.11	1,050	0.49	133	0.06	91	0.04	118	0.05	129	0.06	1,901	0.87	24	217,330	215,405	258,567	84.05
Harare	1,008	0.13	548,895	71.66	831	0.11	148	0.02	150	0.02	347	0.05	647	0.08	3,021	0.39	302	0.04	211	0.03	611	0.08	97	0.01	88	0.01	92	0.01	204,719	26.73	1,577	0.21	156	0.02	574	0.07	1,689	0.22	221	0.03	208	0.03	221	0.03	170	0.02	5,816	0.75	13	771,812	765,983	900,728	85.69
Manicaland	2,759	0.45	296,429	48.48	1,835	0.30	241	0.04	391	0.06	1,223	0.20	1,027	0.17	4,793	0.78	548	0.09	435	0.07	237	0.04	219	0.04	247	0.04	627	0.10	292,938	47.91	2,508	0.41	477	0.08	838	0.14	1,279	0.21	594	0.10	533	0.09	575	0.09	659	0.11	10,221	1.64	8	621,641	611,412	733,370	85.69
Mashonaland Central	1,480	0.31	97,097	20.36	872	0.18	151	0.03	232	0.05	861	0.18	383	0.08	1,557	0.33	150	0.03	187	0.04	139	0.03	120	0.03	110	0.02	1,047	0.22	366,785	76.92	907	0.19	247	0.05	421	0.09	2,616	0.55	413	0.09	373	0.08	254	0.05	447	0.09	6,574	1.36	47	483,470	476,849	531,984	90.88
Mashonaland East	1,681	0.31	189,024	35.30	949	0.18	194	0.04	204	0.04	734	0.14	590	0.11	2,296	0.43	218	0.04	204	0.04	186	0.03	112	0.02	105	0.02	302	0.06	334,617	62.49	1,166	0.22	177	0.03	451	0.08	972	0.18	330	0.06	308	0.06	274	0.05	366	0.07	6,794	1.25	2	542,256	535,460	633,410	85.61
Mashonaland West	2,233	0.41	217,732	39.78	1,435	0.26	202	0.04	336	0.06	1,080	0.20	915	0.17	3,000	0.55	259	0.05	267	0.05	263	0.05	215	0.04	201	0.04	581	0.11	312,958	57.18	1,540	0.28	324	0.06	660	0.12	1,152	0.21	544	0.10	455	0.08	426	0.08	572	0.10	8,652	1.56	11	556,013	547,350	655,363	84.84
Masvingo Province	2,508	0.49	171,196	33.61	2,381	0.47	217	0.04	352	0.07	1,301	0.26	810	0.16	3,017	0.59	335	0.07	281	0.06	289	0.06	218	0.04	158	0.03	775	0.15	319,073	62.63	1,708	0.34	411	0.08	627	0.12	979	0.19	798	0.16	600	0.12	534	0.10	857	0.17	9,941	1.91	6	519,372	509,425	617,212	84.15
Matabeleland North	1,401	0.51	137,611	50.19	1,342	0.49	221	0.08	404	0.15	975	0.36	765	0.28	12,776	4.66	261	0.10	264	0.10	227	0.08	148	0.05	267	0.10	462	0.17	111,452	40.65	1,419	0.52	229	0.08	726	0.26	1,170	0.43	412	0.15	502	0.18	558	0.20	570	0.21	6,767	2.41	8	280,937	274,162	339,135	70.39
Matabeleland South	1,216	0.57	90,292	42.49	1,335	0.63	170	0.08	304	0.14	1,085	0.51	480	0.23	4,698	2.21	249	0.12	215	0.10	222	0.10	158	0.07	209	0.10	404	0.19	107,008	50.35	1,060	0.50	255	0.12	590	0.28	808	0.38	429	0.20	456	0.21	411	0.19	461	0.22	4,080	1.88	1	216,596	212,515	264,185	81.99
Midlands	2,768	0.44	257,960	40.86	1,796	0.28	255	0.04	416	0.07	1,409	0.22	1,077	0.17	4,671	0.74	296	0.05	312	0.05	405	0.06	217	0.03	224	0.04	633	0.10	352,027	55.77	2,000	0.32	405	0.06	776	0.12	1,170	0.19	659	0.10	581	0.09	536	0.08	668	0.11	11,660	1.81	12	642,933	631,261	761,982	84.38
National Total	17,551	0.37	2,150,343	44.99	13,140	0.27	1,893	0.04	2,867	0.06	9,457	0.20	7,014	0.15	45,582	0.95	2,699	0.06	2,436	0.05	2,683	0.06	1,549	0.03	1,674	0.04	4,980	0.10	2,461,745	51.50	15,235	0.32	2,749	0.06	5,894	0.12	12,885	0.27	4,533	0.09	4,107	0.09	3,907	0.08	4,899	0.10	72,406	1.49	132	4,852,360	4,779,822	5,695,936	85.19

=== Results by constituency ===
Results by constituency
Constituency	Province	Joseph Makamba Busha		Nelson Chamisa		Everisto Washington Chikanga		Melbah Dzapasi		Peter Mapfumo Gava		Kwanele Hlabangana		Blessing Kasiyamhuru		Thokozani Khupe		Lovemore Madhuku		Elton Steers Mangoma		Noah Ngoni Manyika		Chiguvare Tonderayi Johannes Timothy Mapfumo		Violet Mariyacha		Divine Mhambi-Hove		Emmerson Dambudzo Mnangagwa		Donald Nkosana Moyo		Bryn Taurai Mteki		Willard Tawonezvi Mugadza		Joice Teurai Ropa Mujuru		Tenda Peter Munyanduri		Ambrose Mutinhiri		Kuzozvirava Doniel Shumba		Peter Harry Wilson		Total Votes Rejected		Ballot Paper Unaccounted for	Total Votes Cast	Total Valid Votes Cast
Constituency	Province	FreeZim Congress		MDC Alliance		Rebuild Zimbabwe		#1980 Freedom Movement Zimbabwe		United Democratic Front		Republican Party of Zimbabwe		Zimbabwe Partnership for Prosperity		MDC-Tsvangirai		National Constitutional Assembly		Coalition of Democrats		Build Zimbabwe Alliance		People's Progressive Party Zimbabwe		United Democracy Movement		National Alliance of Patriotic and Democratic Republicans		ZANU-PF		Alliance for the People's Agenda		Independent		Bethel Christian Party		People's Rainbow Coalition		New Patriotic Front		National Patriotic Front		United Democratic Alliance		Democratic Opposition Party		Total Votes Rejected		Ballot Paper Unaccounted for	Total Votes Cast	Total Valid Votes Cast
Constituency	Province	Votes	%	Votes	%	Votes	%	Votes	%	Votes	%	Votes	%	Votes	%	Votes	%	Votes	%	Votes	%	Votes	%	Votes	%	Votes	%	Votes	%	Votes	%	Votes	%	Votes	%	Votes	%	Votes	%	Votes	%	Votes	%	Votes	%	Votes	%	Votes	%	Ballot Paper Unaccounted for	Total Votes Cast	Total Valid Votes Cast
Beitbridge East	MBS	137	0.50	13,160	48.06	118	0.43	16	0.06	16	0.06	89	0.33	45	0.16	182	0.66	15	0.05	21	0.08	21	0.08	13	0.05	19	0.07	55	0.20	13,042	47.63	80	0.29	20	0.07	29	0.11	137	0.50	39	0.14	38	0.14	37	0.14	51	0.19	492	1.80	0	27,872	27,380
Beitbridge West	MBS	111	0.86	3,597	27.88	95	0.74	15	0.12	16	0.12	80	0.62	31	0.24	219	1.70	22	0.17	15	0.12	21	0.16	20	0.16	20	0.16	55	0.43	8,049	62.38	62	0.48	25	0.19	34	0.26	257	1.99	39	0.30	36	0.28	30	0.23	54	0.42	386	2.99	0	13,289	12,903
Bikita East	MVG	110	0.57	8,633	44.47	135	0.70	8	0.04	17	0.09	70	0.36	24	0.12	145	0.75	24	0.12	9	0.05	10	0.05	6	0.03	6	0.03	36	0.19	9,849	50.73	143	0.74	31	0.16	32	0.16	31	0.16	18	0.09	16	0.08	23	0.12	39	0.20	417	2.15	0	19,832	19,415
Bikita South	MVG	75	0.44	6,575	38.21	84	0.49	16	0.09	12	0.07	47	0.27	13	0.08	127	0.74	19	0.11	9	0.05	8	0.05	8	0.05	6	0.03	37	0.22	9,853	57.26	118	0.69	21	0.12	22	0.13	53	0.31	27	0.16	24	0.14	19	0.11	33	0.19	300	1.74	0	17,506	17,206
Bikita West	MVG	105	0.49	8,712	40.66	108	0.50	8	0.04	12	0.06	38	0.18	31	0.14	144	0.67	18	0.08	10	0.05	12	0.06	12	0.06	6	0.03	54	0.25	11,907	55.56	101	0.47	15	0.07	23	0.11	17	0.08	20	0.09	17	0.08	18	0.08	41	0.19	359	1.68	0	21,788	21,429
Bindura North	MSC	61	0.14	14,824	34.08	31	0.07	7	0.02	10	0.02	31	0.07	18	0.04	94	0.22	6	0.01	12	0.03	4	0.01	6	0.01	7	0.02	15	0.03	28,051	64.49	47	0.11	12	0.03	32	0.07	163	0.37	21	0.05	25	0.06	10	0.02	13	0.03	360	0.83	0	43,860	43,500
Bindura South	MSC	104	0.34	10,926	36.14	76	0.25	11	0.04	12	0.04	49	0.16	26	0.09	139	0.46	10	0.03	11	0.04	13	0.04	7	0.02	4	0.01	25	0.08	18,511	61.23	64	0.21	48	0.16	35	0.12	72	0.24	18	0.06	31	0.10	16	0.05	23	0.08	349	1.15	3	30,583	30,231
Binga North	MBN	152	0.55	19,034	68.75	117	0.42	16	0.06	31	0.11	70	0.25	123	0.44	457	1.65	37	0.13	20	0.07	18	0.07	8	0.03	12	0.04	48	0.17	6,946	25.09	211	0.76	15	0.05	62	0.22	100	0.36	24	0.09	32	0.12	77	0.28	76	0.27	1,003	3.62	0	28,689	27,686
Binga South	MBN	231	0.86	17,799	66.10	165	0.61	18	0.07	86	0.32	93	0.35	72	0.27	541	2.01	28	0.10	24	0.09	19	0.07	14	0.05	27	0.10	48	0.18	7,176	26.65	218	0.81	38	0.14	95	0.35	29	0.11	46	0.17	48	0.18	57	0.21	56	0.21	1,032	3.83	0	27,960	26,928
Bubi	MBN	118	0.44	6,966	25.82	143	0.53	40	0.15	33	0.12	149	0.55	102	0.38	1,857	6.88	28	0.10	22	0.08	18	0.07	12	0.04	35	0.13	52	0.19	16,892	62.62	93	0.34	36	0.13	50	0.19	100	0.37	52	0.19	60	0.22	48	0.18	69	0.26	605	2.24	1	27,581	26,975
Budiriro	HRE	49	0.11	33,718	78.22	47	0.11	5	0.01	4	0.01	10	0.02	28	0.06	145	0.34	10	0.02	7	0.02	3	0.01	1	0.00	2	0.00	5	0.01	8,859	20.55	62	0.14	4	0.01	26	0.06	65	0.15	31	0.07	5	0.01	13	0.03	7	0.02	329	0.76	0	43,435	43,106
Buhera Central	MCL	158	0.70	8,288	36.87	115	0.51	8	0.04	17	0.08	61	0.27	44	0.20	202	0.90	8	0.04	17	0.08	20	0.09	9	0.04	16	0.07	48	0.21	13,015	57.90	119	0.53	33	0.15	47	0.21	71	0.32	39	0.17	48	0.21	36	0.16	58	0.26	629	2.80	0	23,106	22,477
Buhera North	MCL	50	0.29	6,361	36.92	46	0.27	1	0.01	9	0.05	25	0.15	30	0.17	92	0.53	8	0.05	12	0.07	3	0.02	4	0.02	4	0.02	12	0.07	10,379	60.24	58	0.34	10	0.06	22	0.13	41	0.24	13	0.08	15	0.09	20	0.12	13	0.08	197	1.14	0	17,425	17,228
Buhera South	MCL	141	0.60	10,228	43.44	95	0.40	8	0.03	9	0.04	60	0.25	16	0.07	189	0.80	9	0.04	12	0.05	10	0.04	7	0.03	5	0.02	24	0.10	12,415	52.72	137	0.58	16	0.07	45	0.19	25	0.11	22	0.09	23	0.10	28	0.12	23	0.10	389	1.65	0	23,936	23,547
Buhera West	MCL	109	0.50	10,740	48.83	65	0.30	8	0.04	17	0.08	31	0.14	27	0.12	159	0.72	8	0.04	12	0.05	6	0.03	9	0.04	2	0.01	20	0.09	10,476	47.63	124	0.56	16	0.07	34	0.15	43	0.20	17	0.08	19	0.09	28	0.13	26	0.12	300	1.36	0	22,296	21,996
Bulawayo Central	BYO	33	0.17	13,071	66.97	29	0.15	14	0.07	6	0.03	30	0.15	18	0.09	361	1.85	5	0.03	5	0.03	20	0.10	10	0.05	6	0.03	1	0.01	5,514	28.25	219	1.12	11	0.06	27	0.14	98	0.50	11	0.06	11	0.06	7	0.04	11	0.06	152	0.78	5	19,675	19,518
Bulawayo East	BYO	37	0.20	12,334	67.31	19	0.10	8	0.04	3	0.02	28	0.15	14	0.08	317	1.73	7	0.04	3	0.02	17	0.09	3	0.02	1	0.01	7	0.04	5,209	28.43	213	1.16	2	0.01	20	0.11	42	0.23	7	0.04	5	0.03	20	0.11	9	0.05	151	0.82	3	18,479	18,325
Bulawayo South	BYO	21	0.15	9,853	68.24	25	0.17	2	0.01	3	0.02	15	0.10	23	0.16	308	2.13	1	0.01	3	0.02	8	0.06	4	0.03	2	0.01	1	0.01	3,939	27.28	77	0.53	3	0.02	16	0.11	108	0.75	6	0.04	10	0.07	5	0.03	5	0.03	112	0.78	2	14,552	14,438
Bulilima East	MBS	85	0.58	5,798	39.78	88	0.60	14	0.10	26	0.18	63	0.43	29	0.20	431	2.96	13	0.09	19	0.13	16	0.11	9	0.06	17	0.12	22	0.15	7,690	52.76	80	0.55	11	0.08	40	0.27	26	0.18	20	0.14	24	0.16	20	0.14	35	0.24	266	1.82	0	14,842	14,576
Bulilima West	MBS	80	0.63	4,278	33.60	99	0.78	10	0.08	19	0.15	72	0.57	37	0.29	665	5.22	20	0.16	12	0.09	18	0.14	9	0.07	26	0.20	37	0.29	7,071	55.53	68	0.53	18	0.14	39	0.31	33	0.26	32	0.25	26	0.20	28	0.22	37	0.29	289	2.27	0	13,023	12,734
Chakari	MSW	92	0.30	4,947	15.95	57	0.18	6	0.02	22	0.07	89	0.29	60	0.19	96	0.31	11	0.04	12	0.04	14	0.05	7	0.02	10	0.03	26	0.08	25,315	81.63	43	0.14	17	0.05	28	0.09	28	0.09	44	0.14	34	0.11	28	0.09	24	0.08	527	1.70	1	31,538	31,010
Chegutu East	MSW	97	0.40	7,268	30.09	79	0.33	16	0.07	23	0.10	55	0.23	25	0.10	137	0.57	13	0.05	24	0.10	17	0.07	17	0.07	11	0.05	35	0.14	16,068	66.52	58	0.24	12	0.05	38	0.16	51	0.21	26	0.11	29	0.12	31	0.13	26	0.11	357	1.48	0	24,513	24,156
Chegutu West	MSW	44	0.18	14,019	55.88	39	0.16	6	0.02	14	0.06	21	0.08	26	0.10	107	0.43	11	0.04	9	0.04	19	0.08	2	0.01	6	0.02	12	0.05	10,517	41.92	94	0.37	8	0.03	23	0.09	43	0.17	19	0.08	16	0.06	15	0.06	18	0.07	298	1.19	1	25,387	25,088
Chikomba Central	MSE	96	0.69	5,865	42.35	59	0.43	6	0.04	15	0.11	29	0.21	21	0.15	123	0.89	5	0.04	9	0.06	19	0.14	5	0.04	3	0.02	20	0.14	7,314	52.81	85	0.61	11	0.08	27	0.19	78	0.56	18	0.13	6	0.04	16	0.12	20	0.14	180	1.30	0	14,030	13,850
Chikomba East	MSE	95	0.79	4,545	37.79	63	0.52	9	0.07	5	0.04	46	0.38	37	0.31	148	1.23	4	0.03	6	0.05	10	0.08	2	0.02	9	0.07	10	0.08	6,761	56.22	53	0.44	8	0.07	29	0.24	119	0.99	16	0.13	11	0.09	12	0.10	28	0.23	199	1.65	0	12,225	12,026
Chikomba West	MSE	80	0.32	8,428	33.72	44	0.18	6	0.02	10	0.04	33	0.13	31	0.12	110	0.44	8	0.03	5	0.02	13	0.05	7	0.03	5	0.02	9	0.04	16,026	64.11	53	0.21	7	0.03	17	0.07	53	0.21	18	0.07	11	0.04	7	0.03	15	0.06	291	1.16	0	25,287	24,996
Chimanimani East	MCL	159	0.63	8,025	31.95	70	0.28	14	0.06	12	0.05	46	0.18	25	0.10	176	0.70	26	0.10	16	0.06	12	0.05	6	0.02	17	0.07	49	0.20	16,155	64.32	87	0.35	21	0.08	26	0.10	50	0.20	19	0.08	29	0.12	27	0.11	48	0.19	427	1.70	0	25,542	25,115
Chimanimani West	MCL	50	0.24	9,260	45.26	36	0.18	3	0.01	21	0.10	30	0.15	21	0.10	150	0.73	9	0.04	8	0.04	4	0.02	7	0.03	7	0.03	30	0.15	10,621	51.91	76	0.37	10	0.05	30	0.15	26	0.13	14	0.07	14	0.07	21	0.10	12	0.06	209	1.02	0	20,669	20,460
Chinhoyi	MSW	67	0.23	19,740	67.18	43	0.15	9	0.03	5	0.02	18	0.06	32	0.11	100	0.34	5	0.02	4	0.01	9	0.03	5	0.02	6	0.02	4	0.01	9,088	30.93	50	0.17	12	0.04	38	0.13	106	0.36	14	0.05	12	0.04	8	0.03	8	0.03	279	0.95	0	29,662	29,383
Chipinge Central	MCL	83	0.33	9,806	38.82	66	0.26	6	0.02	10	0.04	42	0.17	25	0.10	98	0.39	39	0.15	13	0.05	9	0.04	5	0.02	6	0.02	18	0.07	14,814	58.64	49	0.19	14	0.06	28	0.11	60	0.24	20	0.08	10	0.04	13	0.05	27	0.11	399	1.58	1	25,661	25,261
Chipinge East	MCL	134	0.74	8,367	46.11	100	0.55	9	0.05	16	0.09	71	0.39	24	0.13	342	1.88	16	0.09	8	0.04	14	0.08	8	0.04	12	0.07	36	0.20	8,542	47.07	149	0.82	24	0.13	42	0.23	136	0.75	21	0.12	19	0.10	18	0.10	39	0.21	491	2.71	0	18,638	18,147
Chipinge South	MCL	131	0.63	9,446	45.10	91	0.43	23	0.11	19	0.09	75	0.36	45	0.21	267	1.27	124	0.59	22	0.11	28	0.13	21	0.10	20	0.10	68	0.32	10,187	48.64	118	0.56	25	0.12	51	0.24	24	0.11	35	0.17	38	0.18	38	0.18	48	0.23	537	2.56	0	21,481	20,944
Chipinge West	MCL	53	0.33	8,663	54.13	54	0.34	8	0.05	6	0.04	39	0.24	21	0.13	166	1.04	55	0.34	3	0.02	4	0.02	4	0.02	5	0.03	19	0.12	6,692	41.82	77	0.48	10	0.06	27	0.17	25	0.16	22	0.14	10	0.06	27	0.17	13	0.08	289	1.81	0	16,292	16,003
Chiredzi East	MVG	97	0.65	4,091	27.49	113	0.76	9	0.06	13	0.09	75	0.50	28	0.19	139	0.93	16	0.11	14	0.09	18	0.12	10	0.07	7	0.05	41	0.28	9,940	66.80	40	0.27	17	0.11	28	0.19	36	0.24	57	0.38	26	0.17	25	0.17	41	0.28	349	2.35	0	15,230	14,881
Chiredzi North	MVG	129	0.34	3,091	8.16	160	0.42	10	0.03	24	0.06	110	0.29	51	0.13	66	0.17	16	0.04	15	0.04	8	0.02	6	0.02	5	0.01	39	0.10	33,841	89.32	53	0.14	25	0.07	28	0.07	44	0.12	61	0.16	45	0.12	12	0.03	48	0.13	524	1.38	0	38,411	37,887
Chiredzi South	MVG	147	1.14	2,678	20.85	115	0.90	13	0.10	21	0.16	79	0.62	25	0.19	131	1.02	17	0.13	21	0.16	17	0.13	16	0.12	6	0.05	57	0.44	9,176	71.44	63	0.49	28	0.22	38	0.30	35	0.27	37	0.29	47	0.37	28	0.22	49	0.38	551	4.29	0	13,395	12,844
Chiredzi West	MVG	91	0.28	17,842	54.45	62	0.19	7	0.02	17	0.05	43	0.13	62	0.19	173	0.53	16	0.05	10	0.03	10	0.03	11	0.03	6	0.02	13	0.04	14,174	43.26	55	0.17	16	0.05	28	0.09	19	0.06	39	0.12	27	0.08	25	0.08	19	0.06	622	1.90	0	33,387	32,765
Chirumanzu	MID	92	0.56	6,100	37.39	45	0.28	13	0.08	3	0.02	17	0.10	14	0.09	87	0.53	7	0.04	3	0.02	8	0.05	9	0.06	11	0.07	15	0.09	9,680	59.34	85	0.52	5	0.03	32	0.20	43	0.26	5	0.03	10	0.06	12	0.07	17	0.10	233	1.43	3	16,549	16,313
Chirumanzu-Zibagwe	MID	67	0.24	7,107	25.86	47	0.17	6	0.02	5	0.02	28	0.10	40	0.15	106	0.39	5	0.02	8	0.03	4	0.01	4	0.01	2	0.01	18	0.07	19,862	72.26	55	0.20	15	0.05	21	0.08	24	0.09	26	0.09	7	0.03	13	0.05	15	0.05	418	1.52	0	27,903	27,485
Chitungwiza North	HRE	19	0.08	16,246	70.55	21	0.09	3	0.01	3	0.01	18	0.08	28	0.12	92	0.40	7	0.03	1	0.00	11	0.05	2	0.01	1	0.00	2	0.01	6,461	28.06	29	0.13	1	0.00	12	0.05	51	0.22	3	0.01	6	0.03	8	0.03	4	0.02	120	0.52	1	23,150	23,029
Chitungwiza South	HRE	36	0.12	20,127	69.50	35	0.12	7	0.02	6	0.02	13	0.04	55	0.19	116	0.40	3	0.01	4	0.01	32	0.11	15	0.05	5	0.02	2	0.01	8,366	28.89	29	0.10	3	0.01	28	0.10	49	0.17	4	0.01	7	0.02	9	0.03	9	0.03	214	0.74	0	29,174	28,960
Chivi Central	MVG	125	0.61	6,481	31.87	137	0.67	8	0.04	18	0.09	59	0.29	51	0.25	103	0.51	15	0.07	17	0.08	19	0.09	14	0.07	3	0.01	30	0.15	12,974	63.79	68	0.33	15	0.07	38	0.19	43	0.21	37	0.18	30	0.15	26	0.13	27	0.13	329	1.62	0	20,667	20,338
Chivi North	MVG	68	0.42	5,677	35.39	47	0.29	5	0.03	6	0.04	21	0.13	15	0.09	58	0.36	9	0.06	11	0.07	10	0.06	4	0.02	4	0.02	15	0.09	9,914	61.81	50	0.31	8	0.05	19	0.12	31	0.19	11	0.07	25	0.16	15	0.09	17	0.11	275	1.71	0	16,315	16,040
Chivi South	MVG	133	0.69	4,897	25.56	97	0.51	9	0.05	18	0.09	63	0.33	44	0.23	104	0.54	15	0.08	21	0.11	16	0.08	4	0.02	5	0.03	36	0.19	13,439	70.15	46	0.24	13	0.07	26	0.14	25	0.13	47	0.25	40	0.21	23	0.12	37	0.19	475	2.48	0	19,633	19,158
Chiwundura	MID	93	0.27	18,453	54.37	56	0.17	9	0.03	6	0.02	48	0.14	56	0.17	147	0.43	9	0.03	9	0.03	21	0.06	3	0.01	9	0.03	21	0.06	14,718	43.37	85	0.25	17	0.05	28	0.08	72	0.21	20	0.06	22	0.06	20	0.06	16	0.05	368	1.08	0	34,306	33,938
Dangamvura-Chikanga	MCL	61	0.12	37,370	75.11	45	0.09	4	0.01	10	0.02	21	0.04	51	0.10	166	0.33	23	0.05	3	0.01	8	0.02	8	0.02	9	0.02	8	0.02	11,750	23.61	65	0.13	10	0.02	34	0.07	73	0.15	4	0.01	13	0.03	8	0.02	13	0.03	320	0.64	0	50,077	49,757
Dzivarasekwa	HRE	40	0.14	19,783	71.19	43	0.15	10	0.04	6	0.02	19	0.07	7	0.03	134	0.48	14	0.05	6	0.02	12	0.04	2	0.01	0	0.00	5	0.02	7,517	27.05	44	0.16	4	0.01	33	0.12	72	0.26	6	0.02	11	0.04	15	0.05	7	0.03	242	0.87	0	28,032	27,790
Emakhandeni-Entumbane	BYO	34	0.22	10,837	70.24	32	0.21	8	0.05	9	0.06	29	0.19	26	0.17	325	2.11	9	0.06	3	0.02	4	0.03	3	0.02	4	0.03	2	0.01	3,907	25.32	62	0.40	3	0.02	15	0.10	76	0.49	7	0.05	14	0.09	7	0.05	13	0.08	152	0.99	1	15,582	15,429
Epworth	HRE	93	0.16	37,989	66.02	97	0.17	33	0.06	25	0.04	47	0.08	65	0.11	499	0.87	21	0.04	17	0.03	13	0.02	10	0.02	21	0.04	11	0.02	18,222	31.67	101	0.18	15	0.03	54	0.09	101	0.18	21	0.04	28	0.05	25	0.04	32	0.06	732	1.27	5	58,277	57,540
Glen Norah	HRE	33	0.16	16,514	79.42	16	0.08	1	0.00	3	0.01	4	0.02	10	0.05	45	0.22	4	0.02	1	0.00	13	0.06	1	0.00	1	0.00	3	0.01	4,031	19.39	27	0.13	2	0.01	19	0.09	50	0.24	5	0.02	2	0.01	2	0.01	6	0.03	149	0.72	0	20,942	20,793
Glenview North	HRE	25	0.16	12,462	79.46	15	0.10	5	0.03	3	0.02	4	0.03	30	0.19	43	0.27	5	0.03	3	0.02	3	0.02	0	0.00	0	0.00	2	0.01	2,993	19.08	19	0.12	3	0.02	12	0.08	48	0.31	2	0.01	2	0.01	3	0.02	2	0.01	90	0.57	1	15,775	15,684
Glenview South	HRE	26	0.15	13,664	77.86	19	0.11	7	0.04	5	0.03	10	0.06	39	0.22	59	0.34	3	0.02	12	0.07	7	0.04	4	0.02	1	0.01	1	0.01	3,608	20.56	16	0.09	4	0.02	15	0.09	36	0.21	5	0.03	2	0.01	2	0.01	5	0.03	108	0.62	0	17,658	17,550
Gokwe Central	MID	157	0.65	11,588	48.31	66	0.28	9	0.04	27	0.11	88	0.37	64	0.27	241	1.00	21	0.09	23	0.10	17	0.07	11	0.05	27	0.11	27	0.11	11,263	46.96	90	0.38	17	0.07	40	0.17	86	0.36	35	0.15	29	0.12	25	0.10	35	0.15	446	1.86	0	24,432	23,986
Gokwe Chireya	MID	101	0.42	3,767	15.78	52	0.22	9	0.04	12	0.05	61	0.26	49	0.21	124	0.52	12	0.05	17	0.07	12	0.05	15	0.06	7	0.03	37	0.15	19,375	81.15	91	0.38	16	0.07	19	0.08	18	0.08	21	0.09	15	0.06	12	0.05	35	0.15	557	2.33	0	24,434	23,877
Gokwe Gumunyu	MID	96	0.52	2,890	15.57	46	0.25	6	0.03	12	0.06	65	0.35	24	0.13	109	0.59	4	0.02	11	0.06	5	0.03	3	0.02	7	0.04	17	0.09	15,107	81.41	61	0.33	11	0.06	11	0.06	18	0.10	11	0.06	6	0.03	17	0.09	20	0.11	361	1.95	0	18,918	18,557
Gokwe Kabuyuni	MID	176	0.73	7,826	32.24	103	0.42	13	0.05	25	0.10	104	0.43	31	0.13	300	1.24	21	0.09	14	0.06	9	0.04	25	0.10	15	0.06	34	0.14	15,222	62.71	122	0.50	30	0.12	29	0.12	24	0.10	35	0.14	26	0.11	40	0.16	48	0.20	729	3.00	0	25,001	24,272
Gokwe Kana	MID	164	0.86	5,978	31.22	97	0.51	29	0.15	36	0.19	85	0.44	50	0.26	259	1.35	24	0.13	21	0.11	20	0.10	14	0.07	14	0.07	41	0.21	12,032	62.83	84	0.44	20	0.10	41	0.21	28	0.15	31	0.16	27	0.14	25	0.13	29	0.15	813	4.25	0	19,962	19,149
Gokwe Mapfungautsi	MID	200	0.78	8,483	33.26	139	0.54	16	0.06	24	0.09	95	0.37	48	0.19	294	1.15	16	0.06	24	0.09	15	0.06	20	0.08	12	0.05	46	0.18	15,686	61.50	138	0.54	24	0.09	51	0.20	28	0.11	43	0.17	47	0.18	24	0.09	34	0.13	548	2.15	0	26,055	25,507
Gokwe Nembudziya	MID	96	0.45	7,635	35.75	65	0.30	3	0.01	10	0.05	26	0.12	25	0.12	135	0.63	3	0.01	12	0.06	5	0.02	2	0.01	5	0.02	17	0.08	13,124	61.45	70	0.33	14	0.07	33	0.15	12	0.06	14	0.07	15	0.07	19	0.09	18	0.08	425	1.99	0	21,783	21,358
Gokwe Sasame	MID	249	1.02	8,851	36.41	134	0.55	15	0.06	28	0.12	103	0.42	60	0.25	380	1.56	30	0.12	17	0.07	15	0.06	14	0.06	18	0.07	54	0.22	13,890	57.14	173	0.71	35	0.14	48	0.20	39	0.16	42	0.17	22	0.09	32	0.13	61	0.25	758	3.12	0	25,068	24,310
Gokwe Sengwa	MID	119	0.67	4,283	24.04	83	0.47	7	0.04	23	0.13	71	0.40	42	0.24	207	1.16	13	0.07	15	0.08	20	0.11	11	0.06	9	0.05	30	0.17	12,605	70.76	80	0.45	22	0.12	27	0.15	20	0.11	36	0.20	33	0.19	19	0.11	38	0.21	500	2.81	0	18,313	17,813
Goromonzi North	MSE	91	0.37	11,064	45.51	64	0.26	9	0.04	10	0.04	31	0.13	31	0.13	143	0.59	10	0.04	9	0.04	4	0.02	5	0.02	5	0.02	11	0.05	12,583	51.76	59	0.24	13	0.05	38	0.16	72	0.30	14	0.06	13	0.05	14	0.06	19	0.08	304	1.25	0	24,616	24,312
Goromonzi South	MSE	120	0.19	39,689	63.80	79	0.13	56	0.09	11	0.02	44	0.07	57	0.09	152	0.24	24	0.04	17	0.03	17	0.03	9	0.01	15	0.02	17	0.03	21,593	34.71	92	0.15	11	0.02	35	0.06	98	0.16	19	0.03	18	0.03	15	0.02	25	0.04	676	1.09	0	62,889	62,213
Goromonzi West	MSE	93	0.28	19,181	58.20	66	0.20	13	0.04	10	0.03	37	0.11	24	0.07	160	0.49	12	0.04	9	0.03	11	0.03	5	0.02	4	0.01	17	0.05	12,991	39.42	71	0.22	10	0.03	60	0.18	109	0.33	20	0.06	21	0.06	22	0.07	10	0.03	482	1.46	0	33,438	32,956
Guruve North	MSC	120	0.42	4,216	14.84	62	0.22	27	0.10	11	0.04	54	0.19	24	0.08	77	0.27	12	0.04	5	0.02	7	0.02	9	0.03	6	0.02	28	0.10	23,477	82.62	81	0.29	6	0.02	11	0.04	48	0.17	41	0.14	33	0.12	17	0.06	43	0.15	511	1.80	0	28,926	28,415
Guruve South	MSC	101	0.37	4,049	14.95	51	0.19	7	0.03	17	0.06	63	0.23	23	0.08	84	0.31	12	0.04	6	0.02	14	0.05	5	0.02	3	0.01	33	0.12	22,358	82.53	62	0.23	19	0.07	32	0.12	48	0.18	20	0.07	35	0.13	13	0.05	35	0.13	357	1.32	3	27,450	27,090
Gutu Central	MVG	55	0.33	7,164	42.59	72	0.43	9	0.05	11	0.07	24	0.14	33	0.20	129	0.77	12	0.07	8	0.05	12	0.07	8	0.05	6	0.04	21	0.12	9,082	54.00	51	0.30	12	0.07	22	0.13	29	0.17	13	0.08	17	0.10	15	0.09	14	0.08	452	2.69	0	17,271	16,819
Gutu East	MVG	135	1.02	5,404	40.82	83	0.63	8	0.06	7	0.05	36	0.27	18	0.14	125	0.94	12	0.09	4	0.03	4	0.03	5	0.04	5	0.04	18	0.14	7,157	54.06	81	0.61	11	0.08	28	0.21	11	0.08	15	0.11	15	0.11	24	0.18	34	0.26	335	2.53	0	13,575	13,240
Gutu North	MVG	81	0.69	4,286	36.35	65	0.55	13	0.11	12	0.10	22	0.19	22	0.19	86	0.73	15	0.13	7	0.06	5	0.04	6	0.05	11	0.09	14	0.12	6,949	58.93	65	0.55	7	0.06	15	0.13	28	0.24	26	0.22	16	0.14	14	0.12	26	0.22	238	2.02	0	12,029	11,791
Gutu South	MVG	66	0.45	6,522	44.53	50	0.34	3	0.02	19	0.13	32	0.22	18	0.12	97	0.66	8	0.05	9	0.06	14	0.10	11	0.08	8	0.05	17	0.12	7,577	51.74	83	0.57	12	0.08	12	0.08	20	0.14	12	0.08	7	0.05	20	0.14	28	0.19	253	1.73	0	14,898	14,645
Gutu West	MVG	67	0.37	4,822	26.54	64	0.35	8	0.04	9	0.05	29	0.16	24	0.13	102	0.56	12	0.07	8	0.04	3	0.02	4	0.02	6	0.03	21	0.12	12,747	70.17	62	0.34	6	0.03	15	0.08	65	0.36	25	0.14	17	0.09	22	0.12	28	0.15	346	1.90	1	18,513	18,166
Gwanda Central	MBS	82	0.36	12,833	56.73	71	0.31	11	0.05	18	0.08	80	0.35	25	0.11	252	1.11	13	0.06	15	0.07	10	0.04	12	0.05	7	0.03	16	0.07	8,909	39.38	82	0.36	10	0.04	46	0.20	38	0.17	22	0.10	23	0.10	21	0.09	26	0.11	254	1.12	0	22,876	22,622
Gwanda North	MBS	92	0.70	6,968	52.73	110	0.83	14	0.11	34	0.26	63	0.48	31	0.23	382	2.89	24	0.18	14	0.11	10	0.08	11	0.08	15	0.11	20	0.15	5,118	38.73	83	0.63	11	0.08	51	0.39	29	0.22	34	0.26	26	0.20	44	0.33	30	0.23	301	2.28	0	13,515	13,214
Gwanda South	MBS	63	0.52	4,827	39.99	82	0.68	7	0.06	22	0.18	54	0.45	35	0.29	344	2.85	19	0.16	16	0.13	11	0.09	8	0.07	12	0.10	23	0.19	6,281	52.03	73	0.60	20	0.17	33	0.27	30	0.25	28	0.23	24	0.20	32	0.27	28	0.23	212	1.76	1	12,285	12,072
Gweru Urban	MID	35	0.12	19,554	69.47	28	0.10	1	0.00	5	0.02	16	0.06	36	0.13	139	0.49	4	0.01	9	0.03	26	0.09	4	0.01	5	0.02	3	0.01	8,046	28.58	74	0.26	9	0.03	28	0.10	92	0.33	9	0.03	12	0.04	8	0.03	5	0.02	234	0.83	0	28,382	28,148
Harare Central	HRE	20	0.10	13,216	67.42	12	0.06	5	0.03	2	0.01	4	0.02	4	0.02	66	0.34	10	0.05	1	0.01	34	0.17	3	0.02	1	0.01	2	0.01	6,058	30.90	86	0.44	2	0.01	11	0.06	50	0.26	4	0.02	5	0.03	4	0.02	3	0.02	97	0.49	0	19,700	19,603
Harare East	HRE	39	0.12	22,786	69.99	28	0.09	5	0.02	8	0.02	13	0.04	14	0.04	99	0.30	6	0.02	5	0.02	48	0.15	5	0.02	4	0.01	5	0.02	9,146	28.09	131	0.40	26	0.08	25	0.08	123	0.38	11	0.03	14	0.04	11	0.03	5	0.02	263	0.81	0	32,820	32,557
Harare North	HRE	53	0.17	21,214	68.94	35	0.11	1	0.00	4	0.01	19	0.06	20	0.06	116	0.38	8	0.03	13	0.04	37	0.12	3	0.01	3	0.01	6	0.02	8,938	29.04	121	0.39	18	0.06	38	0.12	97	0.32	7	0.02	14	0.05	6	0.02	2	0.01	306	0.99	0	31,079	30,773
Harare South	HRE	132	0.21	40,097	62.67	117	0.18	25	0.04	18	0.03	56	0.09	69	0.11	309	0.48	26	0.04	13	0.02	16	0.03	12	0.02	18	0.03	14	0.02	22,747	35.55	83	0.13	9	0.01	39	0.06	88	0.14	34	0.05	23	0.04	24	0.04	9	0.01	629	0.98	2	64,609	63,978
Harare West	HRE	24	0.08	23,328	73.90	15	0.05	2	0.01	3	0.01	9	0.03	12	0.04	76	0.24	10	0.03	3	0.01	31	0.10	4	0.01	1	0.00	1	0.00	7,726	24.47	195	0.62	3	0.01	22	0.07	83	0.26	6	0.02	1	0.00	11	0.03	3	0.01	170	0.54	1	31,740	31,569
Hatfield	HRE	26	0.08	23,026	74.95	17	0.06	1	0.00	0	0.00	13	0.04	14	0.05	89	0.29	16	0.05	5	0.02	20	0.07	5	0.02	5	0.02	0	0.00	7,296	23.75	85	0.28	3	0.01	20	0.07	57	0.19	4	0.01	8	0.03	3	0.01	8	0.03	152	0.49	1	30,874	30,721
Headlands	MCL	112	0.48	8,502	36.06	60	0.25	13	0.06	13	0.06	45	0.19	25	0.11	188	0.80	8	0.03	47	0.20	13	0.06	5	0.02	7	0.03	17	0.07	14,284	60.59	77	0.33	14	0.06	19	0.08	51	0.22	18	0.08	21	0.09	15	0.06	22	0.09	325	1.38	0	23,901	23,576
Highfield East	HRE	20	0.10	16,374	78.81	13	0.06	2	0.01	2	0.01	3	0.01	16	0.08	50	0.24	7	0.03	17	0.08	42	0.20	1	0.00	0	0.00	0	0.00	4,106	19.76	26	0.13	5	0.02	7	0.03	75	0.36	3	0.01	2	0.01	4	0.02	1	0.00	118	0.57	0	20,894	20,776
Highfield West	HRE	27	0.16	12,770	77.14	15	0.09	2	0.01	2	0.01	9	0.05	5	0.03	52	0.31	7	0.04	6	0.04	12	0.07	0	0.00	0	0.00	1	0.01	3,576	21.60	19	0.11	8	0.05	6	0.04	26	0.16	1	0.01	5	0.03	6	0.04	0	0.00	92	0.56	0	16,647	16,555
Hurungwe Central	MSW	67	0.29	8,718	37.45	46	0.20	11	0.05	12	0.05	27	0.12	23	0.10	79	0.34	4	0.02	7	0.03	6	0.03	5	0.02	3	0.01	28	0.12	14,097	60.55	36	0.15	13	0.06	18	0.08	23	0.10	18	0.08	16	0.07	9	0.04	15	0.06	279	1.20	0	23,560	23,281
Hurungwe East	MSW	139	0.51	5,090	18.66	67	0.25	20	0.07	12	0.04	65	0.24	43	0.16	116	0.43	8	0.03	17	0.06	15	0.06	13	0.05	13	0.05	40	0.15	21,313	78.15	91	0.33	26	0.10	30	0.11	30	0.11	41	0.15	27	0.10	23	0.08	32	0.12	420	1.54	0	27,691	27,271
Hurungwe North	MSW	151	0.77	6,233	31.78	74	0.38	8	0.04	19	0.10	67	0.34	35	0.18	140	0.71	14	0.07	18	0.09	14	0.07	13	0.07	4	0.02	27	0.14	12,505	63.75	90	0.46	13	0.07	30	0.15	24	0.12	28	0.14	23	0.12	29	0.15	57	0.29	457	2.33	0	20,073	19,616
Hurungwe West	MSW	159	0.80	8,330	42.13	99	0.50	15	0.08	24	0.12	72	0.36	43	0.22	241	1.22	20	0.10	22	0.11	13	0.07	19	0.10	24	0.12	53	0.27	10,266	51.92	110	0.56	28	0.14	47	0.24	51	0.26	30	0.15	21	0.11	37	0.19	48	0.24	527	2.67	2	20,301	19,772
Hwange Central	MBN	49	0.21	18,475	79.95	57	0.25	9	0.04	19	0.08	12	0.05	83	0.36	181	0.78	16	0.07	12	0.05	25	0.11	2	0.01	3	0.01	13	0.06	3,930	17.01	72	0.31	4	0.02	61	0.26	19	0.08	11	0.05	18	0.08	24	0.10	13	0.06	343	1.48	3	23,454	23,108
Hwange East	MBN	98	0.51	12,907	66.88	105	0.54	8	0.04	30	0.16	49	0.25	59	0.31	324	1.68	12	0.06	9	0.05	15	0.08	17	0.09	9	0.05	24	0.12	5,291	27.42	96	0.50	13	0.07	58	0.30	31	0.16	26	0.13	37	0.19	44	0.23	37	0.19	400	2.07	1	19,700	19,299
Hwange West	MBN	70	0.26	17,526	64.56	55	0.20	6	0.02	23	0.08	58	0.21	27	0.10	620	2.28	10	0.04	16	0.06	9	0.03	4	0.01	11	0.04	19	0.07	8,320	30.65	113	0.42	8	0.03	52	0.19	119	0.44	19	0.07	19	0.07	18	0.07	23	0.08	366	1.35	0	27,511	27,145
Insiza North	MBS	104	0.50	6,534	31.28	103	0.49	16	0.08	23	0.11	99	0.47	49	0.23	268	1.28	20	0.10	33	0.16	21	0.10	16	0.08	20	0.10	37	0.18	13,194	63.16	76	0.36	51	0.24	50	0.24	30	0.14	37	0.18	47	0.22	31	0.15	32	0.15	345	1.65	0	21,236	20,891
Insiza South	MBS	73	0.60	5,242	43.42	83	0.69	8	0.07	25	0.21	149	1.23	38	0.31	256	2.12	9	0.07	12	0.10	12	0.10	11	0.09	8	0.07	22	0.18	5,822	48.22	71	0.59	21	0.17	43	0.36	55	0.46	31	0.26	39	0.32	26	0.22	18	0.15	168	1.39	0	12,242	12,074
Kadoma Central	MSW	51	0.17	19,190	64.70	26	0.09	4	0.01	9	0.03	16	0.05	41	0.14	120	0.40	13	0.04	3	0.01	9	0.03	2	0.01	3	0.01	7	0.02	9,981	33.65	39	0.13	9	0.03	28	0.09	71	0.24	13	0.04	8	0.03	7	0.02	11	0.04	356	1.20	0	30,017	29,661
Kambuzuma	HRE	24	0.13	13,443	73.50	31	0.17	3	0.02	2	0.01	5	0.03	9	0.05	73	0.40	10	0.05	6	0.03	8	0.04	1	0.01	2	0.01	3	0.02	4,557	24.91	29	0.16	7	0.04	10	0.05	37	0.20	7	0.04	8	0.04	7	0.04	9	0.05	123	0.67	0	18,414	18,291
Kariba	MSW	173	0.64	14,555	53.62	70	0.26	7	0.03	15	0.06	56	0.21	40	0.15	146	0.54	11	0.04	10	0.04	5	0.02	7	0.03	10	0.04	39	0.14	11,631	42.85	126	0.46	17	0.06	46	0.17	74	0.27	18	0.07	17	0.06	36	0.13	36	0.13	594	2.19	0	27,739	27,145
Kuwadzana	HRE	48	0.15	24,399	75.50	28	0.09	4	0.01	7	0.02	8	0.02	26	0.08	117	0.36	14	0.04	3	0.01	3	0.01	3	0.01	3	0.01	6	0.02	7,479	23.14	40	0.12	6	0.02	25	0.08	68	0.21	8	0.02	9	0.03	10	0.03	3	0.01	214	0.66	0	32,531	32,317
Kuwadzana East	HRE	26	0.12	16,773	79.21	25	0.12	6	0.03	1	0.00	5	0.02	25	0.12	68	0.32	23	0.11	2	0.01	5	0.02	0	0.00	0	0.00	2	0.01	4,109	19.40	15	0.07	2	0.01	15	0.07	55	0.26	3	0.01	3	0.01	7	0.03	5	0.02	116	0.55	0	21,291	21,175
Kwekwe Central	MID	43	0.21	15,202	74.21	34	0.17	5	0.02	5	0.02	13	0.06	30	0.15	106	0.52	6	0.03	3	0.01	10	0.05	0	0.00	3	0.01	2	0.01	4,888	23.86	37	0.18	13	0.06	22	0.11	13	0.06	22	0.11	11	0.05	7	0.03	9	0.04	206	1.01	0	20,690	20,484
Lobengula	BYO	38	0.25	9,814	65.59	24	0.16	8	0.05	4	0.03	47	0.31	14	0.09	378	2.53	5	0.03	6	0.04	8	0.05	5	0.03	14	0.09	5	0.03	4,373	29.23	66	0.44	6	0.04	15	0.10	86	0.57	14	0.09	2	0.01	13	0.09	17	0.11	133	0.89	1	15,096	14,962
Lupane East	MBN	103	0.62	6,608	39.88	111	0.67	12	0.07	28	0.17	79	0.48	47	0.28	572	3.45	15	0.09	23	0.14	20	0.12	16	0.10	19	0.11	41	0.25	8,415	50.79	99	0.60	20	0.12	60	0.36	119	0.72	46	0.28	41	0.25	41	0.25	34	0.21	425	2.57	0	16,994	16,569
Lupane West	MBN	88	0.62	6,586	46.73	62	0.44	10	0.07	16	0.11	58	0.41	31	0.22	451	3.20	22	0.16	13	0.09	5	0.04	6	0.04	14	0.10	31	0.22	6,439	45.68	69	0.49	13	0.09	36	0.26	41	0.29	20	0.14	21	0.15	29	0.21	34	0.24	354	2.51	0	14,449	14,095
Luveve	BYO	65	0.23	18,971	67.36	42	0.15	12	0.04	14	0.05	59	0.21	67	0.24	934	3.32	13	0.05	9	0.03	9	0.03	5	0.02	8	0.03	10	0.04	7,511	26.67	158	0.56	9	0.03	25	0.09	192	0.68	15	0.05	8	0.03	18	0.06	11	0.04	251	0.89	1	28,417	28,165
Mabvuku-Tafara	HRE	28	0.11	18,936	75.19	23	0.09	6	0.02	7	0.03	10	0.04	15	0.06	88	0.35	7	0.03	16	0.06	27	0.11	1	0.00	2	0.01	4	0.02	5,886	23.37	28	0.11	9	0.04	26	0.10	39	0.15	3	0.01	10	0.04	7	0.03	7	0.03	198	0.79	1	25,384	25,185
Magunje	MSW	152	0.82	9,010	48.63	86	0.46	12	0.06	20	0.11	53	0.29	40	0.22	238	1.28	9	0.05	11	0.06	15	0.08	4	0.02	18	0.10	29	0.16	8,514	45.95	132	0.71	14	0.08	34	0.18	31	0.17	24	0.13	21	0.11	32	0.17	29	0.16	444	2.40	0	18,972	18,528
Magwegwe	BYO	41	0.34	8,127	66.65	26	0.21	5	0.04	9	0.07	30	0.25	15	0.12	409	3.35	8	0.07	6	0.05	1	0.01	0	0.00	5	0.04	2	0.02	3,328	27.29	74	0.61	6	0.05	14	0.11	46	0.38	10	0.08	9	0.07	12	0.10	10	0.08	113	0.93	0	12,306	12,193
Makokoba	BYO	35	0.23	10,342	67.73	26	0.17	10	0.07	3	0.02	18	0.12	21	0.14	450	2.95	7	0.05	6	0.04	7	0.05	3	0.02	3	0.02	3	0.02	4,164	27.27	65	0.43	2	0.01	16	0.10	59	0.39	15	0.10	1	0.01	3	0.02	11	0.07	177	1.16	0	15,447	15,270
Makonde	MSW	159	0.64	4,808	19.43	112	0.45	5	0.02	14	0.06	88	0.36	60	0.24	135	0.55	16	0.06	21	0.08	19	0.08	16	0.06	11	0.04	63	0.25	18,868	76.27	84	0.34	20	0.08	34	0.14	36	0.15	46	0.19	42	0.17	27	0.11	56	0.23	538	2.17	1	25,279	24,740
Makoni Central	MCL	69	0.31	13,455	60.33	35	0.16	5	0.02	15	0.07	20	0.09	14	0.06	154	0.69	16	0.07	11	0.05	5	0.02	2	0.01	8	0.04	9	0.04	8,307	37.25	79	0.35	4	0.02	28	0.13	17	0.08	10	0.04	11	0.05	12	0.05	16	0.07	274	1.23	0	22,576	22,302
Makoni North	MCL	84	0.45	6,216	33.35	53	0.28	7	0.04	11	0.06	32	0.17	47	0.25	159	0.85	12	0.06	74	0.40	10	0.05	8	0.04	8	0.04	19	0.10	11,705	62.80	61	0.33	9	0.05	16	0.09	19	0.10	27	0.14	28	0.15	18	0.10	15	0.08	287	1.54	1	18,926	18,638
Makoni South	MCL	124	0.58	10,043	46.60	85	0.39	3	0.01	17	0.08	33	0.15	38	0.18	156	0.72	15	0.07	10	0.05	8	0.04	9	0.04	5	0.02	20	0.09	10,711	49.70	94	0.44	16	0.07	27	0.13	62	0.29	12	0.06	18	0.08	23	0.11	21	0.10	307	1.42	0	21,857	21,550
Makoni West	MCL	82	0.53	7,548	48.71	56	0.36	14	0.09	14	0.09	48	0.31	41	0.26	117	0.75	15	0.10	14	0.09	5	0.03	7	0.05	2	0.01	11	0.07	7,321	47.24	77	0.50	13	0.08	29	0.19	28	0.18	14	0.09	21	0.14	7	0.05	13	0.08	218	1.41	0	15,715	15,497
Mangwe	MBS	124	0.83	6,124	40.75	144	0.96	13	0.09	32	0.21	111	0.74	52	0.35	463	3.08	29	0.19	21	0.14	24	0.16	9	0.06	24	0.16	44	0.29	7,390	49.17	106	0.71	20	0.13	57	0.38	42	0.28	53	0.35	60	0.40	41	0.27	45	0.30	351	2.34	0	15,379	15,028
Maramba-Pfungwe	MSE	34	0.13	1,280	5.03	19	0.07	2	0.01	3	0.01	29	0.11	5	0.02	19	0.07	5	0.02	5	0.02	3	0.01	2	0.01	0	0.00	7	0.03	23,966	94.15	22	0.09	2	0.01	4	0.02	18	0.07	12	0.05	3	0.01	8	0.03	8	0.03	182	0.71	1	25,639	25,456
Marondera Central	MSE	26	0.11	16,772	68.32	22	0.09	0	0.00	1	0.00	12	0.05	10	0.04	85	0.35	11	0.04	5	0.02	6	0.02	2	0.01	0	0.00	2	0.01	7,473	30.44	26	0.11	1	0.00	23	0.09	46	0.19	7	0.03	5	0.02	9	0.04	4	0.02	124	0.51	0	24,672	24,548
Marondera East	MSE	70	0.30	5,679	24.50	48	0.21	8	0.03	7	0.03	27	0.12	30	0.13	61	0.26	7	0.03	8	0.03	10	0.04	5	0.02	3	0.01	11	0.05	17,057	73.59	51	0.22	9	0.04	14	0.06	19	0.08	14	0.06	13	0.06	14	0.06	14	0.06	362	1.56	0	23,541	23,179
Marondera West	MSE	67	0.46	7,034	47.85	49	0.33	9	0.06	15	0.10	31	0.21	39	0.27	168	1.14	9	0.06	9	0.06	6	0.04	3	0.02	13	0.09	19	0.13	7,016	47.72	63	0.43	8	0.05	22	0.15	26	0.18	11	0.07	42	0.29	16	0.11	26	0.18	231	1.57	0	14,932	14,701
Masvingo Central	MVG	94	0.62	5,921	38.77	86	0.56	6	0.04	11	0.07	44	0.29	36	0.24	163	1.07	3	0.02	7	0.05	31	0.20	10	0.07	10	0.07	19	0.12	8,525	55.82	72	0.47	22	0.14	22	0.14	105	0.69	26	0.17	9	0.06	27	0.18	23	0.15	241	1.58	0	15,513	15,272
Masvingo North	MVG	66	0.34	6,022	31.24	67	0.35	4	0.02	15	0.08	44	0.23	40	0.21	103	0.53	10	0.05	1	0.01	9	0.05	4	0.02	6	0.03	18	0.09	12,690	65.83	42	0.22	11	0.06	25	0.13	29	0.15	23	0.12	18	0.09	15	0.08	16	0.08	261	1.35	1	19,540	19,278
Masvingo South	MVG	112	0.66	5,507	32.22	108	0.63	12	0.07	23	0.13	83	0.49	37	0.22	134	0.78	12	0.07	15	0.09	16	0.09	12	0.07	7	0.04	42	0.25	10,652	62.32	72	0.42	24	0.14	23	0.13	86	0.50	28	0.16	18	0.11	25	0.15	44	0.26	308	1.80	0	17,400	17,092
Masvingo Urban	MVG	38	0.11	23,073	65.53	25	0.07	3	0.01	2	0.01	11	0.03	10	0.03	149	0.42	4	0.01	3	0.01	4	0.01	15	0.04	2	0.01	0	0.00	11,713	33.27	23	0.07	10	0.03	23	0.07	48	0.14	6	0.02	12	0.03	31	0.09	5	0.01	225	0.64	1	35,436	35,210
Masvingo West	MVG	60	0.37	6,661	40.77	47	0.29	9	0.06	11	0.07	44	0.27	26	0.16	74	0.45	8	0.05	7	0.04	6	0.04	7	0.04	3	0.02	10	0.06	9,217	56.42	36	0.22	6	0.04	17	0.10	25	0.15	19	0.12	18	0.11	8	0.05	18	0.11	213	1.30	3	16,553	16,337
Matobo North	MBS	87	0.56	6,348	40.74	92	0.59	12	0.08	20	0.13	83	0.53	32	0.21	454	2.91	27	0.17	9	0.06	16	0.10	14	0.09	13	0.08	31	0.20	7,982	51.23	86	0.55	21	0.13	60	0.39	37	0.24	46	0.30	45	0.29	29	0.19	38	0.24	312	2.00	0	15,894	15,582
Matobo South	MBS	79	0.63	5,099	40.95	119	0.96	10	0.08	32	0.26	66	0.53	36	0.29	372	2.99	23	0.18	15	0.12	31	0.25	17	0.14	20	0.16	15	0.12	6,187	49.68	93	0.75	17	0.14	48	0.39	39	0.31	28	0.22	41	0.33	40	0.32	26	0.21	219	1.76	0	12,672	12,453
Mazowe Central	MSC	96	0.50	7,085	36.55	46	0.24	5	0.03	11	0.06	53	0.27	21	0.11	145	0.75	11	0.06	9	0.05	7	0.04	6	0.03	3	0.02	20	0.10	11,620	59.94	60	0.31	10	0.05	30	0.15	73	0.38	18	0.09	17	0.09	18	0.09	23	0.12	346	1.78	5	19,738	19,387
Mazowe North	MSC	100	0.46	4,360	19.88	39	0.18	7	0.03	15	0.07	49	0.22	20	0.09	62	0.28	10	0.05	10	0.05	5	0.02	7	0.03	5	0.02	28	0.13	17,016	77.59	46	0.21	13	0.06	12	0.05	51	0.23	27	0.12	12	0.05	11	0.05	26	0.12	327	1.49	1	22,259	21,931
Mazowe South	MSC	74	0.26	10,451	37.00	51	0.18	8	0.03	14	0.05	42	0.15	22	0.08	153	0.54	17	0.06	11	0.04	4	0.01	5	0.02	3	0.01	35	0.12	17,115	60.59	64	0.23	8	0.03	38	0.13	60	0.21	23	0.08	15	0.05	17	0.06	17	0.06	477	1.69	1	28,725	28,247
Mazowe West	MSC	48	0.21	3,713	16.54	32	0.14	3	0.01	8	0.04	27	0.12	10	0.04	38	0.17	6	0.03	5	0.02	7	0.03	3	0.01	1	0.00	21	0.09	18,386	81.89	31	0.14	9	0.04	19	0.08	34	0.15	13	0.06	16	0.07	7	0.03	16	0.07	310	1.38	0	22,763	22,453
Mbare	HRE	50	0.21	13,455	56.41	30	0.13	2	0.01	4	0.02	7	0.03	17	0.07	122	0.51	6	0.03	8	0.03	17	0.07	2	0.01	2	0.01	2	0.01	10,005	41.94	37	0.16	3	0.01	15	0.06	38	0.16	9	0.04	3	0.01	10	0.04	10	0.04	263	1.10	0	24,117	23,854
Mberengwa East	MID	61	0.45	3,596	26.33	41	0.30	7	0.05	19	0.14	23	0.17	19	0.14	86	0.63	9	0.07	5	0.04	2	0.01	3	0.02	2	0.01	15	0.11	9,550	69.92	56	0.41	5	0.04	16	0.12	108	0.79	13	0.10	4	0.03	7	0.05	12	0.09	210	1.54	0	13,869	13,659
Mberengwa North	MID	109	0.49	3,449	15.41	48	0.21	6	0.03	11	0.05	51	0.23	25	0.11	73	0.33	5	0.02	6	0.03	4	0.02	4	0.02	3	0.01	20	0.09	18,392	82.17	50	0.22	10	0.04	13	0.06	34	0.15	25	0.11	11	0.05	12	0.05	21	0.09	377	1.68	0	22,759	22,382
Mberengwa South	MID	75	0.46	2,830	17.48	43	0.27	7	0.04	11	0.07	56	0.35	31	0.19	88	0.54	2	0.01	7	0.04	3	0.02	9	0.06	2	0.01	20	0.12	12,814	79.13	51	0.31	13	0.08	11	0.07	49	0.30	21	0.13	13	0.08	13	0.08	25	0.15	306	1.89	0	16,500	16,194
Mberengwa West	MID	86	0.65	3,120	23.76	39	0.30	3	0.02	7	0.05	52	0.40	13	0.10	94	0.72	2	0.02	8	0.06	5	0.04	5	0.04	4	0.03	22	0.17	9,525	72.52	42	0.32	9	0.07	12	0.09	27	0.21	22	0.17	8	0.06	14	0.11	15	0.11	278	2.12	0	13,412	13,134
Mbire	MSC	179	0.64	6,476	23.26	93	0.33	19	0.07	21	0.08	89	0.32	34	0.12	166	0.60	14	0.05	14	0.05	15	0.05	9	0.03	12	0.04	43	0.15	20,322	73.00	105	0.38	16	0.06	36	0.13	37	0.13	30	0.11	25	0.09	32	0.11	51	0.18	710	2.55	1	28,549	27,838
Mbizo	MID	56	0.23	18,564	75.36	23	0.09	4	0.02	4	0.02	9	0.04	68	0.28	125	0.51	3	0.01	2	0.01	7	0.03	0	0.00	4	0.02	7	0.03	5,597	22.72	26	0.11	7	0.03	20	0.08	58	0.24	12	0.05	12	0.05	16	0.06	9	0.04	308	1.25	1	24,942	24,633
Mhangura	MSW	126	0.42	4,463	14.85	65	0.22	9	0.03	11	0.04	57	0.19	34	0.11	66	0.22	14	0.05	12	0.04	1	0.00	6	0.02	9	0.03	29	0.10	24,924	82.94	52	0.17	16	0.05	18	0.06	43	0.14	33	0.11	17	0.06	8	0.03	36	0.12	446	1.48	0	30,495	30,049
Mhondoro-Mubaira	MSW	116	0.60	9,465	49.30	79	0.41	10	0.05	10	0.05	44	0.23	29	0.15	247	1.29	16	0.08	13	0.07	5	0.03	15	0.08	13	0.07	29	0.15	8,794	45.80	91	0.47	13	0.07	39	0.20	79	0.41	23	0.12	15	0.08	27	0.14	27	0.14	291	1.52	0	19,490	19,199
Mhondoro-Ngezi	MSW	81	0.36	10,407	46.04	69	0.31	7	0.03	17	0.08	46	0.20	77	0.34	144	0.64	13	0.06	4	0.02	9	0.04	9	0.04	11	0.05	24	0.11	11,475	50.76	53	0.23	10	0.04	22	0.10	64	0.28	24	0.11	13	0.06	12	0.05	14	0.06	290	1.28	0	22,895	22,605
Mkoba	MID	35	0.12	20,775	74.02	24	0.09	5	0.02	4	0.01	11	0.04	52	0.19	83	0.30	2	0.01	1	0.00	54	0.19	1	0.00	4	0.01	6	0.02	6,813	24.28	32	0.11	9	0.03	18	0.06	91	0.32	8	0.03	18	0.06	11	0.04	8	0.03	281	1.00	1	28,347	28,065
Mount Darwin East	MSC	100	0.40	2,864	11.57	61	0.25	8	0.03	19	0.08	66	0.27	32	0.13	74	0.30	11	0.04	15	0.06	10	0.04	8	0.03	7	0.03	30	0.12	20,966	84.70	61	0.25	18	0.07	22	0.09	271	1.09	33	0.13	24	0.10	26	0.11	28	0.11	323	1.30	0	25,077	24,754
Mount Darwin North	MSC	63	0.32	2,383	12.01	49	0.25	6	0.03	15	0.08	53	0.27	17	0.09	70	0.35	4	0.02	13	0.07	6	0.03	12	0.06	5	0.03	28	0.14	16,625	83.78	34	0.17	6	0.03	25	0.13	313	1.58	29	0.15	31	0.16	25	0.13	32	0.16	374	1.88	1	20,219	19,844
Mount Darwin South	MSC	54	0.21	4,539	17.76	37	0.14	8	0.03	11	0.04	43	0.17	18	0.07	53	0.21	7	0.03	9	0.04	9	0.04	4	0.02	8	0.03	577	2.26	19,755	77.30	49	0.19	30	0.12	36	0.14	219	0.86	46	0.18	18	0.07	9	0.04	17	0.07	283	1.11	1	25,840	25,556
Mount Darwin West	MSC	65	0.26	3,505	13.77	60	0.24	15	0.06	16	0.06	65	0.26	26	0.10	126	0.49	9	0.04	19	0.07	6	0.02	7	0.03	25	0.10	46	0.18	20,350	79.92	55	0.22	12	0.05	21	0.08	931	3.66	27	0.11	27	0.11	15	0.06	35	0.14	320	1.26	0	25,783	25,463
Mount Pleasant	HRE	23	0.12	12,989	65.30	16	0.08	0	0.00	3	0.02	4	0.02	2	0.01	59	0.30	10	0.05	9	0.05	34	0.17	2	0.01	0	0.00	1	0.01	6,494	32.65	152	0.76	4	0.02	13	0.07	56	0.28	8	0.04	5	0.03	4	0.02	3	0.02	174	0.87	0	20,065	19,891
Mudzi North	MSE	75	0.36	3,848	18.55	42	0.20	6	0.03	17	0.08	42	0.20	22	0.11	80	0.39	17	0.08	19	0.09	7	0.03	7	0.03	10	0.05	26	0.13	16,376	78.94	36	0.17	11	0.05	13	0.06	19	0.09	16	0.08	20	0.10	11	0.05	26	0.13	323	1.56	0	21,069	20,746
Mudzi South	MSE	42	0.21	1,854	9.32	38	0.19	4	0.02	5	0.03	31	0.16	12	0.06	24	0.12	8	0.04	11	0.06	6	0.03	7	0.04	2	0.01	17	0.09	17,728	89.13	31	0.16	6	0.03	4	0.02	18	0.09	16	0.08	9	0.05	6	0.03	10	0.05	416	2.09	1	20,306	19,889
Mudzi West	MSE	26	0.17	1,400	9.07	8	0.05	3	0.02	4	0.03	19	0.12	7	0.05	29	0.19	7	0.05	8	0.05	3	0.02	0	0.00	6	0.04	10	0.06	13,846	89.66	23	0.15	10	0.06	5	0.03	6	0.04	3	0.02	5	0.03	5	0.03	9	0.06	191	1.24	0	15,633	15,442
Mufakose	HRE	18	0.12	12,105	77.46	14	0.09	3	0.02	3	0.02	4	0.03	6	0.04	71	0.45	22	0.14	13	0.08	11	0.07	1	0.01	4	0.03	2	0.01	3,279	20.98	15	0.10	3	0.02	10	0.06	32	0.20	6	0.04	1	0.01	2	0.01	2	0.01	124	0.79	0	15,751	15,627
Murewa North	MSE	106	0.47	7,401	33.10	50	0.22	13	0.06	13	0.06	33	0.15	23	0.10	118	0.53	6	0.03	12	0.05	24	0.11	6	0.03	8	0.04	19	0.08	14,339	64.13	65	0.29	10	0.04	19	0.08	35	0.16	16	0.07	15	0.07	12	0.05	17	0.08	246	1.10	0	22,606	22,360
Murewa South	MSE	89	0.38	4,824	20.43	36	0.15	7	0.03	16	0.07	37	0.16	27	0.11	57	0.24	16	0.07	16	0.07	4	0.02	4	0.02	1	0.00	11	0.05	18,325	77.62	49	0.21	2	0.01	17	0.07	18	0.08	17	0.07	12	0.05	11	0.05	14	0.06	229	0.97	0	23,839	23,610
Murewa West	MSE	108	0.49	8,263	37.11	53	0.24	12	0.05	16	0.07	40	0.18	34	0.15	223	1.00	14	0.06	14	0.06	7	0.03	9	0.04	4	0.02	18	0.08	13,185	59.22	85	0.38	12	0.05	22	0.10	53	0.24	25	0.11	21	0.09	22	0.10	25	0.11	349	1.57	0	22,614	22,265
Musikavanhu	MCL	110	0.70	8,544	54.36	88	0.56	17	0.11	24	0.15	55	0.35	38	0.24	245	1.56	29	0.18	9	0.06	7	0.04	12	0.08	27	0.17	34	0.22	6,121	38.95	123	0.78	23	0.15	27	0.17	73	0.46	27	0.17	20	0.13	31	0.20	32	0.20	523	3.33	0	16,239	15,716
Mutare Central	MCL	27	0.14	13,988	75.10	17	0.09	4	0.02	4	0.02	4	0.02	24	0.13	54	0.29	21	0.11	4	0.02	1	0.01	3	0.02	2	0.01	3	0.02	4,370	23.46	18	0.10	4	0.02	19	0.10	46	0.25	2	0.01	7	0.04	2	0.01	3	0.02	212	1.14	1	18,840	18,627
Mutare North	MCL	174	0.54	12,014	37.15	97	0.30	17	0.05	27	0.08	86	0.27	101	0.31	286	0.88	15	0.05	17	0.05	12	0.04	16	0.05	13	0.04	28	0.09	18,999	58.74	99	0.31	35	0.11	46	0.14	71	0.22	73	0.23	30	0.09	41	0.13	45	0.14	538	1.66	1	32,881	32,342
Mutare South	MCL	145	0.50	13,304	45.72	94	0.32	15	0.05	15	0.05	91	0.31	87	0.30	280	0.96	17	0.06	33	0.11	13	0.04	12	0.04	20	0.07	25	0.09	14,571	50.07	143	0.49	19	0.07	51	0.18	27	0.09	38	0.13	34	0.12	31	0.11	37	0.13	552	1.90	1	29,655	29,102
Mutare West	MCL	177	0.61	10,082	34.97	121	0.42	15	0.05	19	0.07	110	0.38	72	0.25	275	0.95	20	0.07	23	0.08	17	0.06	21	0.07	12	0.04	34	0.12	17,319	60.08	163	0.57	62	0.22	47	0.16	102	0.35	43	0.15	25	0.09	30	0.10	38	0.13	574	1.99	1	29,402	28,827
Mutasa Central	MCL	73	0.32	13,736	59.80	53	0.23	4	0.02	8	0.03	36	0.16	39	0.17	200	0.87	15	0.07	16	0.07	5	0.02	3	0.01	5	0.02	9	0.04	8,499	37.00	120	0.52	44	0.19	26	0.11	12	0.05	23	0.10	11	0.05	17	0.07	16	0.07	275	1.20	1	23,246	22,970
Mutasa North	MCL	168	0.66	12,921	50.80	92	0.36	11	0.04	17	0.07	49	0.19	96	0.38	174	0.68	7	0.03	11	0.04	8	0.03	13	0.05	12	0.05	23	0.09	11,541	45.37	137	0.54	17	0.07	29	0.11	28	0.11	30	0.12	11	0.04	24	0.09	17	0.07	469	1.84	0	25,905	25,436
Mutasa South	MCL	48	0.17	17,615	62.15	36	0.13	0	0.00	12	0.04	20	0.07	23	0.08	90	0.32	9	0.03	11	0.04	3	0.01	7	0.02	7	0.02	9	0.03	10,257	36.19	42	0.15	7	0.02	33	0.12	77	0.27	11	0.04	6	0.02	11	0.04	10	0.04	296	1.04	0	28,640	28,344
Mutoko East	MSE	62	0.36	2,818	16.32	17	0.10	3	0.02	4	0.02	25	0.14	13	0.08	43	0.25	3	0.02	4	0.02	1	0.01	0	0.00	2	0.01	12	0.07	14,161	82.03	35	0.20	3	0.02	7	0.04	18	0.10	11	0.06	2	0.01	12	0.07	7	0.04	221	1.28	0	17,484	17,263
Mutoko North	MSE	53	0.26	3,778	18.56	19	0.09	1	0.00	5	0.02	22	0.11	14	0.07	53	0.26	4	0.02	2	0.01	4	0.02	4	0.02	1	0.00	6	0.03	16,285	80.01	31	0.15	5	0.02	10	0.05	15	0.07	11	0.05	13	0.06	8	0.04	9	0.04	246	1.21	0	20,599	20,353
Mutoko South	MSE	48	0.19	5,088	20.09	20	0.08	3	0.01	2	0.01	26	0.10	17	0.07	41	0.16	4	0.02	4	0.02	2	0.01	2	0.01	3	0.01	9	0.04	19,969	78.83	23	0.09	5	0.02	6	0.02	19	0.08	10	0.04	7	0.03	5	0.02	18	0.07	320	1.26	0	25,651	25,331
Muzarabani North	MSC	35	0.19	1,786	9.59	14	0.08	2	0.01	4	0.02	12	0.06	12	0.06	26	0.14	3	0.02	11	0.06	1	0.01	2	0.01	2	0.01	22	0.12	16,616	89.22	15	0.08	1	0.01	6	0.03	14	0.08	10	0.05	7	0.04	8	0.04	14	0.08	194	1.04	5	18,822	18,623
Muzarabani South	MSC	38	0.15	2,169	8.48	30	0.12	2	0.01	5	0.02	34	0.13	15	0.06	29	0.11	4	0.02	7	0.03	5	0.02	4	0.02	4	0.02	25	0.10	23,115	90.38	23	0.09	2	0.01	10	0.04	24	0.09	6	0.02	7	0.03	3	0.01	14	0.05	283	1.11	17	25,875	25,575
Muzvezve	MSW	91	0.27	10,648	31.89	71	0.21	11	0.03	22	0.07	80	0.24	37	0.11	139	0.42	18	0.05	13	0.04	24	0.07	9	0.03	10	0.03	21	0.06	21,954	65.76	38	0.11	11	0.03	30	0.09	56	0.17	29	0.09	32	0.10	17	0.05	26	0.08	513	1.54	1	33,901	33,387
Mwenezi East	MVG	148	0.54	4,604	16.89	154	0.57	13	0.05	20	0.07	94	0.34	56	0.21	101	0.37	15	0.06	16	0.06	16	0.06	10	0.04	6	0.02	70	0.26	21,553	79.09	71	0.26	36	0.13	31	0.11	48	0.18	58	0.21	37	0.14	25	0.09	70	0.26	641	2.35	0	27,893	27,252
Mwenezi West	MVG	102	0.35	1,627	5.63	121	0.42	7	0.02	12	0.04	97	0.34	42	0.15	52	0.18	18	0.06	16	0.06	11	0.04	11	0.04	11	0.04	45	0.16	26,475	91.54	49	0.17	19	0.07	14	0.05	41	0.14	53	0.18	38	0.13	17	0.06	45	0.16	645	2.23	0	29,568	28,923
Nkayi North	MBN	82	0.48	3,989	23.21	105	0.61	22	0.13	19	0.11	85	0.49	32	0.19	3,302	19.21	21	0.12	32	0.19	16	0.09	10	0.06	36	0.21	37	0.22	8,955	52.11	72	0.42	7	0.04	38	0.22	154	0.90	33	0.19	43	0.25	40	0.23	55	0.32	499	2.90	0	17,684	17,185
Nkayi South	MBN	162	0.85	7,389	38.57	163	0.85	48	0.25	41	0.21	103	0.54	74	0.39	2,938	15.34	23	0.12	35	0.18	27	0.14	17	0.09	57	0.30	41	0.21	7,471	39.00	133	0.69	30	0.16	68	0.35	118	0.62	41	0.21	68	0.35	53	0.28	56	0.29	701	3.66	0	19,857	19,156
Nketa	BYO	58	0.24	15,562	65.61	32	0.13	7	0.03	9	0.04	38	0.16	49	0.21	428	1.80	5	0.02	4	0.02	13	0.05	2	0.01	4	0.02	10	0.04	7,141	30.11	168	0.71	5	0.02	31	0.13	110	0.46	11	0.05	8	0.03	12	0.05	13	0.05	203	0.86	1	23,924	23,720
Nkulumane	BYO	48	0.26	12,212	66.55	35	0.19	5	0.03	5	0.03	51	0.28	19	0.10	581	3.17	6	0.03	2	0.01	5	0.03	2	0.01	3	0.02	6	0.03	5,099	27.79	91	0.50	3	0.02	17	0.09	125	0.68	12	0.07	10	0.05	7	0.04	5	0.03	125	0.68	4	18,478	18,349
Norton	MSW	45	0.16	19,216	66.73	40	0.14	2	0.01	14	0.05	18	0.06	93	0.32	86	0.30	21	0.07	6	0.02	4	0.01	10	0.03	5	0.02	9	0.03	9,070	31.50	53	0.18	9	0.03	31	0.11	34	0.12	9	0.03	6	0.02	4	0.01	10	0.03	193	0.67	0	28,988	28,795
Nyanga North	MCL	109	0.46	9,028	38.39	69	0.29	12	0.05	24	0.10	52	0.22	23	0.10	212	0.90	4	0.02	13	0.06	7	0.03	4	0.02	12	0.05	34	0.14	13,589	57.79	101	0.43	7	0.03	27	0.11	76	0.32	23	0.10	26	0.11	29	0.12	35	0.15	444	1.89	1	23,961	23,516
Nyanga South	MCL	128	0.53	12,879	53.59	96	0.40	12	0.05	25	0.10	41	0.17	30	0.12	196	0.82	20	0.08	16	0.07	5	0.02	9	0.04	4	0.02	20	0.08	10,298	42.85	115	0.48	14	0.06	28	0.12	16	0.07	17	0.07	26	0.11	20	0.08	19	0.08	740	3.08	0	24,774	24,034
Pelandaba-Mpopoma	BYO	38	0.26	9,504	65.53	27	0.19	7	0.05	2	0.01	41	0.28	15	0.10	456	3.14	5	0.03	8	0.06	6	0.04	2	0.01	3	0.02	3	0.02	4,232	29.18	66	0.46	4	0.03	15	0.10	43	0.30	5	0.03	5	0.03	5	0.03	11	0.08	144	0.99	0	14,647	14,503
Pumula	BYO	49	0.24	13,480	65.65	47	0.23	8	0.04	11	0.05	56	0.27	39	0.19	806	3.93	10	0.05	5	0.02	6	0.03	6	0.03	12	0.06	7	0.03	5,751	28.01	91	0.44	14	0.07	20	0.10	65	0.32	20	0.10	8	0.04	9	0.04	13	0.06	188	0.92	6	20,727	20,533
Redcliff	MID	65	0.26	13,625	54.99	40	0.16	8	0.03	8	0.03	43	0.17	27	0.11	227	0.92	10	0.04	10	0.04	16	0.06	7	0.03	4	0.02	7	0.03	10,434	42.11	54	0.22	8	0.03	34	0.14	51	0.21	20	0.08	32	0.13	35	0.14	11	0.04	500	2.02	1	25,277	24,776
Rushinga	MSC	83	0.25	4,770	14.56	43	0.13	4	0.01	13	0.04	46	0.14	18	0.05	77	0.24	2	0.01	11	0.03	8	0.02	14	0.04	8	0.02	39	0.12	27,343	83.45	46	0.14	18	0.05	16	0.05	136	0.42	17	0.05	17	0.05	10	0.03	25	0.08	325	0.99	4	33,093	32,764
Sanyati	MSW	89	0.51	5,519	31.50	58	0.33	6	0.03	13	0.07	59	0.34	36	0.21	126	0.72	9	0.05	9	0.05	13	0.07	12	0.07	5	0.03	21	0.12	11,347	64.76	55	0.31	14	0.08	17	0.10	51	0.29	21	0.12	14	0.08	11	0.06	16	0.09	321	1.83	0	17,842	17,521
Seke	MSE	119	0.32	20,322	54.38	72	0.19	12	0.03	15	0.04	65	0.17	81	0.22	257	0.69	27	0.07	11	0.03	13	0.03	10	0.03	5	0.01	15	0.04	16,047	42.94	93	0.25	14	0.04	33	0.09	61	0.16	28	0.07	27	0.07	24	0.06	20	0.05	379	1.01	0	37,750	37,371
Shamva North	MSC	96	0.40	4,503	18.76	65	0.27	8	0.03	19	0.08	57	0.24	31	0.13	105	0.44	7	0.03	13	0.05	14	0.06	6	0.03	6	0.03	18	0.08	18,843	78.52	36	0.15	11	0.05	19	0.08	75	0.31	16	0.07	20	0.08	8	0.03	22	0.09	241	1.00	4	24,243	23,998
Shamva South	MSC	63	0.20	4,478	14.36	32	0.10	4	0.01	11	0.04	28	0.09	16	0.05	39	0.13	5	0.02	6	0.02	4	0.01	6	0.02	1	0.00	14	0.04	26,316	84.40	28	0.09	8	0.03	21	0.07	47	0.15	18	0.06	13	0.04	9	0.03	13	0.04	484	1.55	1	31,665	31,180
Shurugwi North	MID	56	0.20	10,363	37.85	40	0.15	7	0.03	9	0.03	39	0.14	35	0.13	112	0.41	9	0.03	3	0.01	20	0.07	6	0.02	9	0.03	25	0.09	16,470	60.16	45	0.16	10	0.04	19	0.07	38	0.14	14	0.05	25	0.09	11	0.04	14	0.05	396	1.45	2	27,777	27,379
Shurugwi South	MID	58	0.32	5,476	29.96	61	0.33	11	0.06	13	0.07	37	0.20	37	0.20	84	0.46	6	0.03	8	0.04	3	0.02	6	0.03	6	0.03	19	0.10	12,293	67.26	36	0.20	10	0.05	22	0.12	25	0.14	19	0.10	19	0.10	12	0.07	17	0.09	297	1.62	0	18,575	18,278
Silobela	MID	92	0.38	9,375	39.12	112	0.47	14	0.06	38	0.16	97	0.40	45	0.19	352	1.47	20	0.08	28	0.12	30	0.13	9	0.04	12	0.05	37	0.15	13,297	55.49	108	0.45	24	0.10	60	0.25	29	0.12	46	0.19	42	0.18	51	0.21	46	0.19	643	2.68	0	24,607	23,964
Southerton	HRE	17	0.11	11,179	74.75	11	0.07	0	0.00	5	0.03	6	0.04	14	0.09	45	0.30	4	0.03	2	0.01	8	0.05	2	0.01	1	0.01	0	0.00	3,568	23.86	25	0.17	3	0.02	15	0.10	33	0.22	2	0.01	8	0.05	4	0.03	4	0.03	89	0.60	0	15,045	14,956
St Mary's	HRE	35	0.14	17,917	70.66	33	0.13	5	0.02	8	0.03	12	0.05	36	0.14	70	0.28	8	0.03	12	0.05	111	0.44	2	0.01	4	0.02	5	0.02	6,978	27.52	22	0.09	3	0.01	14	0.06	51	0.20	7	0.03	7	0.03	11	0.04	4	0.02	162	0.64	0	25,517	25,355
Sunningdale	HRE	14	0.09	12,213	75.20	8	0.05	1	0.01	1	0.01	5	0.03	15	0.09	68	0.42	12	0.07	2	0.01	10	0.06	1	0.01	2	0.01	0	0.00	3,827	23.57	17	0.10	0	0.00	10	0.06	24	0.15	3	0.02	4	0.02	2	0.01	1	0.01	104	0.64	0	16,344	16,240
Tsholotsho North	MBN	90	0.65	5,580	40.18	74	0.53	7	0.05	20	0.14	42	0.30	28	0.20	369	2.66	7	0.05	11	0.08	11	0.08	10	0.07	16	0.12	27	0.19	7,148	51.47	77	0.55	10	0.07	56	0.40	170	1.22	19	0.14	35	0.25	49	0.35	31	0.22	224	1.61	0	14,111	13,887
Tsholotsho South	MBN	81	0.53	5,102	33.26	118	0.77	10	0.07	36	0.23	91	0.59	45	0.29	615	4.01	24	0.16	28	0.18	22	0.14	19	0.12	17	0.11	65	0.42	8,671	56.53	75	0.49	18	0.12	56	0.37	74	0.48	36	0.23	47	0.31	42	0.27	48	0.31	310	2.02	0	15,650	15,340
Umguza	MBN	77	0.29	9,650	36.02	67	0.25	15	0.06	22	0.08	86	0.32	42	0.16	549	2.05	18	0.07	19	0.07	22	0.08	13	0.05	11	0.04	16	0.06	15,798	58.97	91	0.34	17	0.06	34	0.13	96	0.36	39	0.15	33	0.12	36	0.13	38	0.14	505	1.89	3	27,297	26,789
Umzingwane	MBS	99	0.47	9,484	45.19	131	0.62	24	0.11	21	0.10	76	0.36	40	0.19	410	1.95	15	0.07	13	0.06	11	0.05	9	0.04	8	0.04	27	0.13	10,273	48.95	100	0.48	10	0.05	60	0.29	55	0.26	20	0.10	27	0.13	32	0.15	41	0.20	485	2.31	0	21,471	20,986
Uzumba	MSE	56	0.24	2,257	9.68	24	0.10	6	0.03	4	0.02	27	0.12	18	0.08	41	0.18	5	0.02	7	0.03	10	0.04	7	0.03	2	0.01	16	0.07	20,740	88.93	27	0.12	10	0.04	7	0.03	20	0.09	12	0.05	7	0.03	6	0.03	12	0.05	402	1.72	0	23,723	23,321
Vungu	MID	129	0.63	8,639	41.95	119	0.58	23	0.11	27	0.13	68	0.33	35	0.17	270	1.31	25	0.12	19	0.09	29	0.14	10	0.05	16	0.08	41	0.20	10,774	52.31	91	0.44	10	0.05	45	0.22	49	0.24	42	0.20	57	0.28	32	0.16	46	0.22	404	1.96	0	21,000	20,596
Warren Park	HRE	15	0.05	20,466	74.90	27	0.10	2	0.01	7	0.03	9	0.03	14	0.05	93	0.34	10	0.04	8	0.03	24	0.09	5	0.02	1	0.00	2	0.01	6,475	23.70	59	0.22	1	0.00	23	0.08	62	0.23	6	0.02	7	0.03	4	0.01	6	0.02	128	0.47	0	27,454	27,326
Wedza North	MSE	59	0.34	3,992	22.91	34	0.20	5	0.03	11	0.06	24	0.14	23	0.13	99	0.57	8	0.05	9	0.05	2	0.01	8	0.05	4	0.02	13	0.07	12,997	74.59	36	0.21	5	0.03	20	0.11	23	0.13	5	0.03	18	0.10	11	0.06	19	0.11	237	1.36	0	17,662	17,425
Wedza South	MSE	66	0.56	3,642	30.74	23	0.19	1	0.01	5	0.04	24	0.20	14	0.12	62	0.52	4	0.03	5	0.04	4	0.03	3	0.03	0	0.00	7	0.06	7,839	66.17	57	0.48	4	0.03	19	0.16	29	0.24	11	0.09	9	0.08	8	0.07	11	0.09	204	1.72	0	12,051	11,847
Zaka Central	MVG	110	0.57	7,143	37.16	89	0.46	6	0.03	13	0.07	30	0.16	34	0.18	152	0.79	14	0.07	11	0.06	8	0.04	7	0.04	5	0.03	42	0.22	11,320	58.89	71	0.37	9	0.05	24	0.12	25	0.13	33	0.17	19	0.10	19	0.10	39	0.20	411	2.14	0	19,634	19,223
Zaka East	MVG	88	0.67	3,549	27.07	114	0.87	6	0.05	12	0.09	33	0.25	19	0.14	89	0.68	10	0.08	10	0.08	7	0.05	2	0.02	2	0.02	26	0.20	8,945	68.23	51	0.39	10	0.08	25	0.19	29	0.22	26	0.20	14	0.11	10	0.08	33	0.25	336	2.56	0	13,446	13,110
Zaka North	MVG	106	0.58	6,360	34.57	91	0.49	8	0.04	13	0.07	34	0.18	32	0.17	165	0.90	9	0.05	15	0.08	8	0.04	8	0.04	10	0.05	28	0.15	11,233	61.06	82	0.45	18	0.10	28	0.15	24	0.13	38	0.21	26	0.14	23	0.13	39	0.21	424	2.30	0	18,822	18,398
Zaka West	MVG	100	0.79	3,854	30.33	87	0.68	9	0.07	4	0.03	39	0.31	19	0.15	106	0.83	8	0.06	7	0.06	7	0.06	7	0.06	6	0.05	26	0.20	8,171	64.31	60	0.47	9	0.07	21	0.17	32	0.25	43	0.34	22	0.17	25	0.20	44	0.35	411	3.23	0	13,117	12,706
Zengeza East	HRE	21	0.10	15,092	68.99	20	0.09	2	0.01	6	0.03	10	0.05	20	0.09	94	0.43	9	0.04	9	0.04	5	0.02	4	0.02	2	0.01	2	0.01	6,432	29.40	33	0.15	5	0.02	19	0.09	67	0.31	8	0.04	4	0.02	6	0.03	7	0.03	147	0.67	1	22,025	21,877
Zengeza West	HRE	27	0.12	16,614	72.53	20	0.09	0	0.00	2	0.01	11	0.05	32	0.14	63	0.28	10	0.04	7	0.03	14	0.06	5	0.02	2	0.01	3	0.01	5,980	26.11	32	0.14	0	0.00	12	0.05	56	0.24	4	0.02	4	0.02	1	0.00	6	0.03	163	0.71	0	23,068	22,905
Zhombe	MID	111	0.47	8,931	37.51	87	0.37	11	0.05	28	0.12	56	0.24	86	0.36	238	1.00	14	0.06	15	0.06	19	0.08	15	0.06	6	0.03	31	0.13	13,867	58.24	78	0.33	20	0.08	38	0.16	52	0.22	33	0.14	28	0.12	21	0.09	26	0.11	441	1.85	1	24,253	23,811
Zvimba East	MSW	85	0.26	16,179	49.94	61	0.19	6	0.02	9	0.03	39	0.12	38	0.12	174	0.54	10	0.03	11	0.03	8	0.02	9	0.03	6	0.02	22	0.07	15,465	47.73	67	0.21	16	0.05	36	0.11	85	0.26	19	0.06	18	0.06	23	0.07	13	0.04	470	1.45	0	32,869	32,399
Zvimba North	MSW	76	0.31	3,747	15.21	64	0.26	9	0.04	15	0.06	38	0.15	24	0.10	67	0.27	3	0.01	16	0.06	14	0.06	11	0.04	8	0.03	29	0.12	20,263	82.26	46	0.19	11	0.04	23	0.09	77	0.31	26	0.11	24	0.10	20	0.08	23	0.09	421	1.71	2	25,057	24,634
Zvimba South	MSW	111	0.51	7,706	35.56	60	0.28	11	0.05	20	0.09	35	0.16	25	0.12	122	0.56	11	0.05	14	0.06	10	0.05	3	0.01	5	0.02	16	0.07	13,298	61.37	53	0.24	16	0.07	29	0.13	60	0.28	5	0.02	27	0.12	7	0.03	26	0.12	405	1.87	3	22,078	21,670
Zvimba West	MSW	62	0.36	8,474	48.59	70	0.40	12	0.07	16	0.09	37	0.21	54	0.31	174	1.00	9	0.05	11	0.06	20	0.11	21	0.12	10	0.06	18	0.10	8,205	47.05	79	0.45	19	0.11	21	0.12	35	0.20	34	0.19	23	0.13	15	0.09	21	0.12	226	1.30	0	17,666	17,440
Zvishavane-Ngezi	MID	70	0.23	16,407	54.57	59	0.20	3	0.01	5	0.02	21	0.07	10	0.03	107	0.36	5	0.02	6	0.02	12	0.04	0	0.00	3	0.01	5	0.02	13,212	43.94	48	0.16	10	0.03	20	0.07	21	0.07	14	0.05	8	0.03	11	0.04	10	0.03	284	0.94	3	30,354	30,067
Zvishavane-Runde	MID	77	0.40	5,093	26.63	65	0.34	5	0.03	11	0.06	26	0.14	25	0.13	98	0.51	9	0.05	8	0.04	14	0.07	7	0.04	5	0.03	16	0.08	13,491	70.54	38	0.20	12	0.06	18	0.09	21	0.11	20	0.10	22	0.12	17	0.09	28	0.15	339	1.77	0	19,465	19,126
Total		17,551	0.37	2,150,343	44.99	13,140	0.27	1,893	0.04	2,867	0.06	9,457	0.20	7,014	0.15	45,582	0.95	2,699	0.06	2,436	0.05	2,683	0.06	1,549	0.03	1,674	0.04	4,980	0.10	2,461,745	51.50	15,235	0.32	2,749	0.06	5,894	0.12	12,885	0.27	4,533	0.09	4,107	0.09	3,907	0.08	4,899	0.10	72,406	1.51	132	4,852,360	4,779,822
Total		Votes	%	Votes	%	Votes	%	Votes	%	Votes	%	Votes	%	Votes	%	Votes	%	Votes	%	Votes	%	Votes	%	Votes	%	Votes	%	Votes	%	Votes	%	Votes	%	Votes	%	Votes	%	Votes	%	Votes	%	Votes	%	Votes	%	Votes	%	Votes	%	Ballot Paper Unaccounted for	Total Votes Cast	Total Valid Votes Cast
Total																																																Total Votes Rejected		Ballot Paper Unaccounted for	Total Votes Cast	Total Valid Votes Cast
Total		FreeZim Congress		MDC Alliance		Rebuild Zimbabwe		#1980 Freedom Movement Zimbabwe		United Democratic Front		Republican Party of Zimbabwe		Zimbabwe Partnership for Prosperity		MDC-Tsvangirai		National Constitutional Assembly		Coalition of Democrats		Build Zimbabwe Alliance		People's Progressive Party Zimbabwe		United Democracy Movement		National Alliance of Patriotic and Democratic Republicans		ZANU-PF		Alliance for the People's Agenda		Independent		Bethel Christian Party		People's Rainbow Coalition		New Patriotic Front		National Patriotic Front		United Democratic Alliance		Democratic Opposition Party		Total Votes Rejected		Ballot Paper Unaccounted for	Total Votes Cast	Total Valid Votes Cast
Total		Joseph Makamba Busha		Nelson Chamisa		Everisto Washington Chikanga		Melbah Dzapasi		Peter Mapfumo Gava		Kwanele Hlabangana		Blessing Kasiyamhuru		Thokozani Khupe		Lovemore Madhuku		Elton Steers Mangoma		Noah Ngoni Manyika		Chiguvare Tonderayi Johannes Timothy Mapfumo		Violet Mariyacha		Divine Mhambi-Hove		Emmerson Dambudzo Mnangagwa		Donald Nkosana Moyo		Bryn Taurai Mteki		Willard Tawonezvi Mugadza		Joice Teurai Ropa Mujuru		Tenda Peter Munyanduri		Ambrose Mutinhiri		Kuzozvirava Doniel Shumba		Peter Harry Wilson		Total Votes Rejected		Ballot Paper Unaccounted for	Total Votes Cast	Total Valid Votes Cast

== National Assembly ==
=== Summary ===
Party	Votes	%	Seats			
Party	Votes	%	Common	Women	Total	+/–
ZANU–PF	2,493,522	52.36	143	35	178	–18
Movement for Democratic Change Alliance	1,648,767	34.62	65	24	89	New
Movement for Democratic Change – Tsvangirai	144,679	3.04	0	1	1	–69
People's Rainbow Coalition	62,081	1.30	0	0	0	New
National Patriotic Front	53,755	1.13	1	0	1	New
Zimbabwe Partnership for Prosperity	26,982	0.57	0	0	0	New
Zimbabwe African People's Union	16,050	0.34	0	0	0	0
Zimbabwe Democratic Union	11,203	0.24	0	0	0	New
National Constitutional Assembly	9,763	0.20	0	0	0	New
Build Zimbabwe Alliance	8,507	0.18	0	0	0	New
Mthwakazi Republic Party	8,263	0.17	0	0	0	New
Coalition of Democrats	6,526	0.14	0	0	0	New
FreeZim Congress	4,096	0.09	0	0	0	0
United Democratic Alliance	3,615	0.08	0	0	0	New
Republican Party of Zimbabwe	3,265	0.07	0	0	0	New
Alliance for People's Agenda	2,165	0.05	0	0	0	New
#1980 Freedom Movement Zimbabwe	2,146	0.05	0	0	0	New
United Movement for Democracy	1,997	0.04	0	0	0	0
United African National Council	1,892	0.04	0	0	0	New
The African Democrats	1,387	0.03	0	0	0	New
The Alliance for National Salvation	1,204	0.03	0	0	0	New
Zimbabwe Revolutionary Democratic Party	1,170	0.02	0	0	0	New
People's Progressive Party Zimbabwe	1,064	0.02	0	0	0	New
Freedom Justice Coalition Zimbabwe	773	0.02	0	0	0	New
United Democratic Front	611	0.01	0	0	0	New
Zimbabwe Labour Party	464	0.01	0	0	0	New
Zimbabwe Patriotic Movement	402	0.01	0	0	0	New
Zimbabwe First Party	373	0.01	0	0	0	New
National Action Party	362	0.01	0	0	0	New
Rebuilding Zimbabwe Party	346	0.01	0	0	0	New
Ma'at Zimbabwe Party	342	0.01	0	0	0	New
Zimbabwe People's Party: Good People's Movement	328	0.01	0	0	0	New
Democratic Opposition Party	323	0.01	0	0	0	New
Forces of the Liberation Organisation of African National Party	303	0.01	0	0	0	New
Chief's Party	282	0.01	0	0	0	New
Unity Party Zimbabwe	214	0.00	0	0	0	New
New Zimbabwe Republican Party	198	0.00	0	0	0	New
Federal Democrats of Zimbabwe	194	0.00	0	0	0	New
Economic Reform Assembly	176	0.00	0	0	0	New
Democratic Alliance - United People's Party	147	0.00	0	0	0	New
Progressive Democrats of Zimbabwe	144	0.00	0	0	0	New
United Christian Alliance	121	0.00	0	0	0	New
United Crusade for Achieving Democracy Green Party of Zimbabwe	103	0.00	0	0	0	New
African People's Congress	70	0.00	0	0	0	New
Suffering Voices of Zimbabwe	66	0.00	0	0	0	New
Freedom Front	44	0.00	0	0	0	0
Independents	242,000	5.08	1	0	1	–1
Total	4,762,485	100.00	210	60	270	0
Valid votes	4,762,485	98.35				
Invalid/blank votes	79,821	1.65				
Total votes	4,842,306	100.00				
Registered voters/turnout	5,706,681	84.85				

=== Constituency results ===
House of Assembly election results by constituency ZANU-PF MDC Alliance National Patriotic Front Independent

The Parliamentary results were also marked by miscalculations, errors in spreadsheet tabulation, as well as a legal dispute between results announced and votes counted. The most notable dispute was that of the constituency of Chegutu West, where 121 votes from one ward were misallocated, leaving the MDC-A candidate, Gift Konjana with 10,828 votes to ZANU-PF candidate Dexter Nduna's 10,932. When the error was noticed, ZEC claimed that they had already announced ZANU-PF as the winner, and the result could only be reversed with an order of an Electoral Court. The matter ended up in court as Gift Machoka Konjana v Dexter Nduna, though ultimately ZANU-PF's Nduna took the seat in Parliament, in spite of losing the election to Konjana.

A document was finally provided by ZEC entitled Verified National Assembly Results 2018. While this document corrected errors such as that of Chegutu West, the constituency breakdown tables also included miscalculations. The Harare Provincial totals stated that the voter population was 900,728, although when the totals in the individual Harare constituencies were added up, the total came to 903,728 - an increase of 3,000. Similarly, the Mashonaland West Provincial totals were declared to have a voter population of 655,133, though the constituency totals added up to 663,106 - an increase of 7,973. Unlike the Presidential results, no spreadsheets were provided by ZEC giving a ward-by-ward breakdown of the Parliamentary votes. The document produced by ZEC shows a valid vote total across the country of 4,571,000, whereas the total of all the votes in the constituency listing comes to 4,762,485 - an increase of 191,485.

The MDC Alliance party stood more than one candidate in 11 constituencies, which split the vote for their party. In three of those constituencies the two MDC Alliance candidates together received the most votes, meaning that if the MDC Alliance had fielded only one candidate the party likely would have won those seats. In total, there are a net of 14 constituency based seats MDC Alliance would have likely won if they had fielded only one candidate per constituency and if other third-party candidates and independents had not stood. ZESN's analysis also noted that there were six constituencies where the parliamentary results and the presidential results were in conflict. For all six the ZANU-PF candidate won the parliamentary election with over 50% of the vote, but the votes for Mnangagwa were less than the votes for the ZANU-PF candidate. Of particular note is Zvishavane Ngezi where Chamisa beat Mnanagagwa by more than the ZANU-PF candidate beat the MDC Alliance candidate plus votes for other candidates. This calls into question the accuracy of this parliamentary result.

The Parliamentary results below are those provided by ZEC in the final Verified Results document, and include the errors mentioned above. However, as the tables below reflect the election results, Chegutu West is regarded as an MDC-A seat, in spite of it eventually being awarded to ZANU-PF.

==== Results by constituency ====
Results by constituency according to ZEC's Combined Verified Results
Constituency	Province	2013 result	2018 winning party				Turnout (Note: Excludes spoilt ballots)	Votes								
Constituency	Province	2013 result	Party	Votes	Share	Majority	Turnout	ZANU	MDC A	MDC–T	NPF	Other (Note: Includes all other parties and all independent candidates)	Total Valid	Votes Rejected	Total Cast	Voter Population
Beitbridge East	MBS	ZANU	ZANU	13,949	50.93%	2,454	80.10%	13,949	11,495			1,943	27,387	473	27,860	34,783
Beitbridge West	MBS	ZANU	ZANU	8,421	65.28%	5,538	80.69%	8,421	2,883			1,595	12,899	388	13,287	16,466
Bikita East	MVG	ZANU	ZANU	10,261	52.57%	1,719	83.98%	10,261	9,180 (Note: MDC-A fielded two candidates, acquiring 8,542 and 638 votes respectively)			76	19,517	315	19,832	23,616
Bikita South	MVG	ZANU	ZANU	10,559	61.45%	6,972	83.79%	10,559	3,587	792		2,245	17,183	323	17,506	20,893
Bikita West	MVG	ZANU	ZANU	12,991	60.55%	5,582	84.78%	12,991	7,409	592		463	21,455	333	21,788	25,700
Bindura North	MSC	ZANU	ZANU	29,897	68.89%	18,845	89.94%	29,897	11,052	595	695	1,158	43,397	456	43,853	48,759
Bindura South	MSC	ZANU	ZANU	19,201	63.54%	9,903	87.94%	19,201	9,298	636	351	731	30,217	364	30,581	34,775
Binga North	MBN	MDC–T	MDC-A	18,428	66.02%	10,677	85.06%	7,751	18,428		191	1,541	27,911	767	28,678	33,716
Binga South	MBN	MDC–T	MDC-A	10,357	38.42%	3,846	82.81%	6,511	10,357	1,428		8,662	26,958	991	27,949	33,752
Bubi	MBN	ZANU	ZANU	16,214	60.24%	10,395	82.57%	16,214	5,819	2,218	627	2,038	26,916	657	27,573	33,394
Budiriro	HRE	MDC–T	MDC-A	28,575	66.75%	20,046	85.88%	8,529	28,575	4,409	60	1,238	42,811	538	43,349	50,478
Buhera Central	MCL	ZANU	ZANU	13,125	58.28%	7,367	84.95%	13,125	5,758	1,141	1,455	1,040	22,519	587	23,106	27,201
Buhera North	MCL	ZANU	ZANU	10,056	58.64%	4,301	86.70%	10,056	5,755	491	212	634	17,148	277	17,425	20,097
Buhera South	MCL	ZANU	ZANU	13,141	55.64%	6,516	85.08%	13,141	6,625			3,852	23,618	316	23,934	28,132
Buhera West	MCL	ZANU	ZANU	11,901	54.05%	2,674	85.43%	11,901	9,227			891	22,019	283	22,302	26,107
Bulawayo Central	BYO	MDC–T	MDC-A	11,178	57.62%	6,939	85.23%	4,239	11,178	1,648	169	2,165	19,399	246	19,645	23,049
Bulawayo East	BYO	MDC–T	MDC-A	9,707	53.34%	5,765	85.00%	3,942	9,707	2,201	191	2,157	18,198	253	18,451	21,707
Bulawayo South	BYO	MDC–T	ZANU	5,752	40.06%	1,597	86.63%	5,752	6,404 (Note: MDC-A fielded two candidates, acquiring 4,155 and 2,249 votes respectively)	410	73	1,720	14,359	171	14,530	16,772
Bulilima East	MBS	ZANU	ZANU	7,657	52.50%	2,856	82.46%	7,657	4,801	855		1,272	14,585	266	14,851	18,009
Bulilima West	MBS	ZANU	ZANU	6,984	54.70%	3,480	81.23%	6,984	3,504	1,312		967	12,767	254	13,021	16,030
Chakari	MSW	ZANU	ZANU	25,028	80.95%	20,826	86.74%	25,028	4,202		738	949	30,917	621	31,538	36,359
Chegutu East	MSW	ZANU	ZANU	15,873	66.28%	10,781	86.42%	15,873	5,092	987	272	1,724	23,948	561	24,509	28,361
Chegutu West (Note: Although MDC-A officially won the vote count, due to a miscalculation on the day, ZANU-PF was declared the winner, and the ZANU-PF member eventually took the seat in Parliament. The case was heard in court as Gift Machoka Konjana v Dexter Nduna)	MSW	ZANU	MDC-A	10,949	43.87%	17	85.26%	10,932	10,949	1,796	381	898	24,956	427	25,383	29,771
Chikomba Central	MSE	ZANU	ZANU	7,543	54.36%	3,006	82.87%	7,543	4,537			1,795	13,875	153	14,028	16,928
Chikomba East	MSE	ZANU	ZANU	7,972	66.02%	4,377	83.97%	7,972	3,595			508	12,075	148	12,223	14,556
Chikomba West	MSE	ZANU	ZANU	17,079	68.46%	11,504	83.49%	17,079	5,575	1,661		634	24,949	334	25,283	30,283
Chimanimani East	MCL	ZANU	ZANU	17,610	70.09%	14,368	83.27%	17,610	3,242			4,273	25,125	413	25,538	30,668
Chimanimani West	MCL	ZANU	ZANU	10,757	52.49%	1,558	88.08%	10,757	9,199	0		536	20,492	177	20,669	23,466
Chinhoyi	MSW	MDC–T	MDC-A	16,641	56.87%	6,795	83.96%	9,846	16,641	784	62	1,928	29,261	384	29,645	35,310
Chipinge Central	MCL	ZANU	ZANU	15,017	59.75%	7,252	85.31%	15,017	7,765	1,163		1,190	25,135	502	25,637	30,053
Chipinge East	MCL	ZANU	MDC-A	8,967	49.22%	618	83.87%	8,349	8,967			902	18,218	420	18,638	22,222
Chipinge South	MCL	ZANU	ZANU	9,382	44.81%	1,512	83.84%	9,382	7,870			3,687	20,939	542	21,481	25,621
Chipinge West	MCL	ZANU	MDC-A	8,754	54.60%	2,279	84.79%	6,475	8,754		121	682	16,032	255	16,287	19,209
Chiredzi East	MVG	ZANU	ZANU	11,052	73.97%	7,163	84.39%	11,052	3,889			0	14,941	285	15,226	18,043
Chiredzi North	MVG	ZANU	ZANU	35,893	94.91%	34,602	96.93%	35,893			1,291	635	37,819	632	38,451	44,233
Chiredzi South	MVG	ZANU	ZANU	9,710	75.52%	7,774	82.38%	9,710	1,936	431		780	12,857	538	13,395	16,260
Chiredzi West	MVG	ZANU	ZANU	15,759	48.01%	5,251	86.03%	15,759	10,508		259	6,299	32,825	545	33,370	38,789
Chirumanzu	MID	ZANU	ZANU	11,144	68.26%	6,289	84.95%	11,144	4,855			328	16,327	219	16,546	19,476
Chirumanzu-Zibagwe	MID	ZANU	ZANU	19,045	69.60%	12,076	84.17%	19,045	6,969		509	842	27,365	545	27,910	33,158
Chitungwiza North	HRE	MDC–T	MDC-A	10,756	46.92%	4,494	84.22%	6,262	10,756	1,499		4,409	22,926	210	23,136	27,470
Chitungwiza South	HRE	ZANU	MDC-A	15,823	54.95%	7,389	83.89%	8,434	15,823	3,341	76	1,119	28,793	371	29,164	34,763
Chivi Central	MVG	ZANU	ZANU	14,186	69.99%	9,492	82.91%	14,186	4,694	892		498	20,270	406	20,676	24,937
Chivi North	MVG	ZANU	ZANU	10,627	66.31%	5,722	84.00%	10,627	4,905			494	16,026	291	16,317	19,426
Chivi South	MVG	ZANU	ZANU	13,330	69.71%	10,018	81.03%	13,330	3,312			2,481	19,123	510	19,633	24,230
Chiwundura	MID	ZANU	MDC-A	14,895	44.08%	217	81.94%	14,678	14,895			4,216	33,789	504	34,293	41,852
Dangamvura-Chikanga	MCL	MDC–T	MDC-A	32,381	65.46%	22,527	82.42%	9,854	32,381	2,902		4,333	49,470	583	50,053	60,726
Dzivarasekwa	HRE	MDC–T	MDC-A	15,995	56.81%	6,907	88.24%	9,088	15,995	2,031	58	981	28,153	385	28,538	32,341
Emakhandeni-Entumbane	BYO	MDC–T	MDC-A	8,398	54.65%	5,319	83.75%	3,079	8,398	1,451	301	2,139	15,368	196	15,564	18,583
Epworth	HRE	ZANU	MDC-A	26,082	45.49%	9,933	80.87%	16,149	26,082	2,676		12,427	57,334	907	58,241	72,019
Glen Norah	HRE	MDC–T	MDC-A	14,998	72.47%	10,973	86.87%	4,025	14,998	644		1,029	20,696	215	20,911	24,072
Glenview North	HRE	MDC–T	MDC-A	10,523	67.42%	7,566	87.64%	2,957	10,523	1,526		601	15,607	151	15,758	17,981
Glenview South	HRE	MDC–T	MDC-A	9,942	56.99%	6,694	86.99%	3,248	9,942	452		3,804	17,446	195	17,641	20,279
Gokwe Central	MID	ZANU	ZANU	10,057	41.86%	1,950	82.54%	10,057	8,107		192	5,671	24,027	405	24,432	29,600
Gokwe Chireya	MID	ZANU	ZANU	19,906	83.10%	16,628	88.40%	19,906	3,278		171	598	23,953	479	24,432	27,639
Gokwe Gumunyu	MID	ZANU	ZANU	15,245	81.99%	12,652	87.23%	15,245	2,593			755	18,593	329	18,922	21,692
Gokwe Kabuyuni	MID	ZANU	ZANU	15,695	64.23%	8,500	88.39%	15,695	7,195		127	1,419	24,436	562	24,998	28,282
Gokwe Kana	MID	ZANU	ZANU	12,250	63.74%	10,026	82.90%	12,250	2,224	287	384	4,073	19,218	745	19,963	24,081
Gokwe Mapfungautsi	MID	ZANU	ZANU	19,292	75.40%	15,093	84.26%	19,292	4,199			2,095	25,586	464	26,050	30,917
Gokwe Nembudziya	MID	ZANU	ZANU	13,543	63.05%	5,862	85.47%	13,543	7,681		256	0	21,480	305	21,785	25,487
Gokwe Sasame	MID	ZANU	ZANU	15,067	61.69%	8,152	85.01%	15,067	6,915		809	1,631	24,422	649	25,071	29,491
Gokwe Sengwa	MID	ZANU	ZANU	13,136	73.57%	9,890	83.88%	13,136	3,246		911	561	17,854	456	18,310	21,830
Goromonzi North	MSE	ZANU	ZANU	17,277	71.12%	11,915	82.25%	17,277	5,362	1,237		416	24,292	320	24,612	29,924
Goromonzi South	MSE	ZANU	MDC-A	32,423	52.41%	13,521	85.90%	18,902	32,423	2,447		8,091	61,863	977	62,840	73,155
Goromonzi West	MSE	ZANU	ZANU	12,384	37.64%	2,110	85.60%	12,384	16,965 (Note: MDC-A fielded two candidates, acquiring 10,274 and 6,691 votes respectively)			3,555	32,904	520	33,424	39,046
Guruve North	MSC	ZANU	ZANU	24,271	85.90%	21,163	89.74%	24,271	3,108		454	423	28,256	544	28,800	32,094
Guruve South	MSC	ZANU	ZANU	17,103	63.28%	15,345	88.70%	17,103	1,758		93	8,074	27,028	421	27,449	30,947
Gutu Central	MVG	ZANU	ZANU	11,496	68.47%	7,691	84.87%	11,496	4,853 (Note: MDC-A fielded two candidates, acquiring 3,805 and 1,048 votes respectively)	149		291	16,789	483	17,272	20,350
Gutu East	MVG	ZANU	ZANU	7,201	54.28%	2,330	84.65%	7,201	4,871	1,194		0	13,266	308	13,574	16,035
Gutu North	MVG	ZANU	ZANU	8,080	68.51%	4,802	84.74%	8,080	3,278	436		0	11,794	238	12,032	14,198
Gutu South	MVG	ZANU	ZANU	7,938	54.22%	1,886	84.36%	7,938	6,052	259		391	14,640	256	14,896	17,658
Gutu West	MVG	ZANU	ZANU	14,139	78.01%	11,141	85.00%	14,139	3,544 (Note: MDC-A fielded two candidates, acquiring 2,998 and 546 votes respectively)			442	18,125	384	18,509	21,776
Gwanda Central	MBS	ZANU	MDC-A	10,390	46.09%	930	82.64%	9,460	10,390	1,140	26	1,529	22,545	315	22,860	27,663
Gwanda North	MBS	ZANU	ZANU	4,419	33.43%	1,119	83.05%	4,419	3,300	1,081		4,419	13,219	293	13,512	16,270
Gwanda South	MBS	ZANU	ZANU	5,890	48.81%	1,189	80.36%	5,890	4,701	501		974	12,066	214	12,280	15,282
Gweru Urban	MID	MDC–T	MDC-A	17,896	63.74%	10,768	82.09%	7,128	17,896		219	2,833	28,076	294	28,370	34,559
Harare Central	HRE	MDC–T	MDC-A	10,876	55.73%	5,244	87.33%	5,632	10,876	2,251		19,514	19,514	172	19,686	22,541
Harare East	HRE	MDC–T	MDC-A	20,592	63.44%	11,999	86.69%	8,593	20,592	1,269	41	1,962	32,457	344	32,801	37,837
Harare North	HRE	ZANU	MDC-A	16,820	54.82%	4,715	85.04%	12,105	16,820	631		1,126	30,682	387	31,069	36,535
Harare South	HRE	ZANU	ZANU	24,503	38.70%	3,132	84.34%	24,503	29,044 (Note: MDC-A fielded two candidates, acquiring 21,317 and 7,673 votes respectively)	4,016	617	5,137	63,317	1,142	64,459	76,425
Harare West	HRE	MDC–T	MDC-A	19,612	63.22%	14,137	86.92%	5,475	19,612	798		5,137	31,022	275	31,297	36,007
Hatfield	HRE	MDC–T	MDC-A	18,576	60.99%	12,121	86.94%	6,455	18,576	1,119	140	4,165	30,455	330	30,785	35,409
Headlands	MCL	ZANU	ZANU	13,798	58.89%	8,918	85.14%	13,798	4,880	2,190		2,564	23,432	467	23,899	28,069
Highfield East	HRE	MDC–T	MDC-A	13,079	63.40%	9,431	77.88%	3,648	13,079	1,943		1,960	20,630	236	20,866	26,791
Highfield West	HRE	MDC–T	MDC-A	11,515	70.03%	8,042	86.40%	3,473	11,515	730	28	697	16,443	195	16,638	19,256
Hurungwe Central	MSW	ZANU	ZANU	14,321	55.32%	6,882	86.03%	14,321	7,439	784	2,125	1,218	25,887	472	26,359	30,639
Hurungwe East	MSW	ZANU	ZANU	18,683	76.14%	14,610	79.32%	18,683			4,073	1,782	24,538	598	25,136	31,688
Hurungwe North	MSW	ZANU	ZANU	12,726	64.86%	6,947	85.48%	12,726	5,779		263	852	19,620	450	20,070	23,480
Hurungwe West	MSW	ZANU	ZANU	11,645	58.84%	4,352	63.95%	11,645	7,293		403	450	19,791	474	20,265	31,688
Hwange Central	MBN	MDC–T	MDC-A	15,702	68.12%	10,639	85.11%	5,063	15,702	995		1,290	23,050	379	23,429	27,529
Hwange East	MBN	MDC–T	MDC-A	8,648	44.93%	3,676	83.30%	4,972	8,648	1,896	135	3,596	19,247	440	19,687	23,634
Hwange West	MBN	ZANU	MDC-A	11,580	42.87%	4,184	84.90%	7,396	11,580	2,944		5,089	27,009	451	27,460	32,345
Insiza North	MBS	ZANU	ZANU	15,276	73.45%	13,252	81.93%	15,276		2,024	1,825	1,673	20,798	430	21,228	25,911
Insiza South	MBS	ZANU	ZANU	6,583	54.58%	3,338	83.02%	6,583	3,245	945	262	1,026	12,061	173	12,234	14,736
Kadoma Central	MSW	ZANU	MDC-A	15,278	51.83%	7,896	82.71%	7,382	15,278	1,122	194	5,502	29,478	528	30,006	36,277
Kambuzuma	HRE	MDC–T	MDC-A	10,694	58.95%	6,425	85.64%	4,269	10,694	1,164	215 (Note: NPF fielded two candidates, acquiring 140 and 75 votes respectively.)	2,014	18,141	267	18,408	21,495
Kariba	MSW	ZANU	MDC-A	13,258	48.88%	1,307	85.70%	11,951	13,258	634		1,279	27,122	616	27,738	32,368
Kuwadzana	HRE	MDC–T	MDC-A	19,808	61.47%	10,211	84.65%	9,597	19,808	1,338	38	1,444	32,225	279	32,504	38,398
Kuwadzana East	HRE	MDC–T	MDC-A	15,390	73.00%	11,528	85.76%	3,862	15,390			1,830	21,082	196	21,278	24,811
Kwekwe Central	MID	ZANU	NPF	7,578	36.98%	461	84.64%	4,571	7,117		7,578	1,227	20,493	187	20,680	24,434
Lobengula	BYO	MDC–T	MDC-A	7,619	51.19%	3,815	84.89%	3,804	7,619	1,009	248	2,205	14,885	199	15,084	17,769
Lupane East	MBN	ZANU	ZANU	7,875	47.55%	2,084	82.44%	7,875	5,791	759	69	2,069	16,563	424	16,987	20,606
Lupane West	MBN	ZANU	ZANU	6,163	43.75%	822	81.14%	6,163	5,341	1,437	154	992	14,087	363	14,450	17,809
Luveve	BYO	MDC–T	MDC-A	13,193	47.08%	6,519	81.42%	6,674	13,193	3,018	181	4,956	28,022	389	28,411	34,893
Mabvuku-Tafara	HRE	MDC–T	MDC-A	13,756	54.83%	6,190	86.27%	7,566	15,733 (Note: MDC-A fielded two candidates, acquiring 13,756 and 1,977 votes respectively)	1,120		671	25,090	285	25,375	29,415
Magunje	MSW	ZANU	ZANU	6,726	36.18%	1,032	84.73%	6,726	5,694			6,168	18,588	383	18,971	22,390
Magwegwe	BYO	MDC–T	MDC-A	5,650	46.74%	3,284	82.82%	2,366	5,650	1,491	128	2,452	12,087	202	12,289	14,839
Makokoba	BYO	MDC–T	MDC-A	7,365	48.53%	3,376	84.50%	3,989	7,365	1,335	174	2,312	15,175	248	15,423	18,252
Makonde	MSW	ZANU	ZANU	19,337	78.21%	15,088	85.50%	19,337	4,249		617	523	24,726	552	25,278	29,564
Makoni Central	MCL	ZANU	MDC-A	12,531	56.09%	3,275	85.46%	9,256	12,531			554	22,341	231	22,572	26,412
Makoni North	MCL	ZANU	ZANU	12,189	65.48%	7,248	85.92%	12,189	4,941			1,484	18,614	310	18,924	22,026
Makoni South	MCL	ZANU	ZANU	11,622	53.95%	2,585	85.54%	11,622	9,037			882	21,541	314	21,855	25,549
Makoni West	MCL	ZANU	ZANU	7,772	50.28%	3,242	83.84%	7,772	4,530	2,507		649	15,458	257	15,715	18,745
Mangwe	MBS	ZANU	ZANU	7,744	51.40%	3,208	81.28%	7,744	4,536	1,335		1,451	15,066	308	15,374	18,914
Maramba Pfungwe	MSE	ZANU	ZANU	24,317	95.72%	23,388	91.88%	24,317	929			158	25,404	233	25,637	27,904
Marondera Central	MSE	ZANU	MDC-A	14,604	59.68%	6,218	84.82%	8,386	14,604	854		625	24,469	197	24,666	29,080
Marondera East	MSE	ZANU	ZANU	18,365	79.31%	13,761	85.27%	18,365	4,604			187	23,156	382	23,538	27,603
Marondera West	MSE	ZANU	ZANU	7,619	51.82%	2,219	84.00%	7,619	5,400	368		1,315	14,702	227	14,929	17,842
Masvingo Central	MVG	ZANU	ZANU	8,152	53.42%	3,443	83.13%	8,152	4,709			2,400	15,261	248	15,509	18,656
Masvingo North	MVG	ZANU	ZANU	11,906	61.93%	8,551	84.32%	11,906	3,355	654		3,311	19,226	308	19,534	23,166
Masvingo South	MVG	ZANU	ZANU	9,228	54.20%	6,683	83.75%	9,228	3,796 (Note: MDC-A fielded two candidates, acquiring 2,353 and 1,443 votes respectively. The second biggest party was PRC.)			4,001	17,025	376	17,401	20,777
Masvingo Urban	MVG	ZANU	MDC-A	17,451	49.84%	4,814	83.48%	12,637	17,451	2,051	196	2,682	35,017	413	35,430	42,442
Masvingo West	MVG	ZANU	ZANU	9,212	56.62%	4,518	83.73%	9,212	4,694	879		1,485	16,270	273	16,543	19,757
Matobo North	MBS	ZANU	ZANU	8,797	56.42%	4,394	82.84%	8,797	4,403	635	93	1,665	15,593	295	15,888	19,180
Matobo South	MBS	ZANU	ZANU	6,130	49.04%	1,924	82.51%	6,130	4,206	481		1,682	12,499	172	12,671	15,356
Mazowe Central	MSC	ZANU	ZANU	12,380	63.87%	8,356	87.34%	12,380	4,024	917	134	1,928	19,383	346	19,729	22,590
Mazowe North	MSC	ZANU	ZANU	17,277	79.01%	15,208	89.47%	17,277	3,504 (Note: MDC-A fielded two candidates, acquiring 2,069 and 1,435 votes respectively.)			2,520	21,866	390	22,256	24,874
Mazowe South	MSC	ZANU	ZANU	16,830	60.05%	11,552	87.66%	16,830	9,817 (Note: MDC-A fielded two candidates, acquiring 5,278 and 4,539 votes respectively.)		732	646	28,025	689	28,714	32,756
Mazowe West	MSC	ZANU	ZANU	18,349	82.18%	16,206	88.95%	18,349	2,958 (Note: MDC-A fielded two candidates, acquiring 2,143 and 815 votes respectively.)		699	323	22,329	427	22,756	25,582
Mbare	HRE	ZANU	MDC-A	12,981	54.80%	3,391	84.64%	9,590	12,981	702		417	23,690	422	24,112	28,489
Mberengwa East	MID	ZANU	ZANU	8,606	62.96%	4,517 (Note: The second largest party was PRC with 4,089 votes.)	82.26%	8,606	835			4,229	13,670	197	13,867	16,857
Mberengwa North	MID	ZANU	ZANU	18,412	82.37%	14,928	85.76%	18,412	3,484			457	22,353	405	22,758	26,537
Mberengwa South	MID	ZANU	ZANU	12,791	79.16%	10,284	83.92%	12,791	2,507			861	16,159	338	16,497	19,658
Mberengwa West	MID	ZANU	ZANU	10,337	78.36%	7,606	84.86%	10,337	2,731			124	13,192	211	13,403	15,794
Mbire	MSC	ZANU	ZANU	17,071	68.30%	12,367 (Note: The second largest party was ZDU with 4,704 votes.)	88.24%	17,071	3,009			4,915	24,995	576	25,571	28,979
Mbizo	MID	MDC–T	MDC-A	15,349	62.37%	9,185	84.42%	6,164	15,349		706 (Note: NPF fielded two candidates, acquiring 544 and 162 votes respectively.)	2,391	24,610	334	24,944	29,549
Mhangura	MSW	ZANU	ZANU	26,072	86.99%	22,606	87.48%	26,072	3,466		301	132	29,971	517	30,488	34,850
Mhondoro-Mubaira	MSW	ZANU	ZANU	9,418	48.96%	3,925	84.40%	9,418	5,493			4,324	19,235	253	19,488	23,089
Mhondoro-Ngezi	MSW	ZANU	ZANU	12,708	56.25%	6,145	84.52%	12,708	6,563	584		2,735	22,590	301	22,891	27,085
Mkoba	MID	MDC–T	MDC-A	18,925	67.64%	12,837	81.00%	6,088	18,925	893	77	1,997	27,980	307	28,287	34,924
Mount Darwin East	MSC	ZANU	ZANU	20,570	83.36%	18,098	89.74%	20,570	2,472		500	1,133	24,675	391	25,066	27,933
Mount Darwin North	MSC	ZANU	ZANU	16,166	81.42%	15,104	88.04%	16,166	1,062		396	2,230	19,854	362	20,216	22,961
Mount Darwin South	MSC	ZANU	ZANU	21,248	83.26%	18,100	88.45%	21,248	3,148		651	473	25,520	290	25,810	29,180
Mount Darwin West	MSC	ZANU	ZANU	19,920	78.41%	18,226	89.83%	19,920	1,694		912	2,880	25,406	372	25,778	28,696
Mount Pleasant	HRE	ZANU	MDC-A	9,357	47.27%	4,062	86.72%	5,295	9,357	602		4,541	19,795	261	20,056	23,126
Mudzi North	MSE	ZANU	ZANU	14,575	70.22%	11,822	84.89%	14,575	2,753			3,429	20,757	313	21,070	24,821
Mudzi South	MSE	IND.	ZANU	18,820	94.28%	17,679	89.27%	18,820	1,141			0	19,961	342	20,303	22,743
Mudzi West	MSE	ZANU	ZANU	14,289	92.57%	13,142	88.51%	14,289	1,147			0	15,436	197	15,633	17,663
Mufakose	HRE	MDC–T	MDC-A	9,087	58.57%	6,662	87.03%	2,425	9,087	1,075	111	5,241	15,514	226	15,740	18,086
Murewa North	MSE	ZANU	ZANU	16,781	74.96%	11,871	82.10%	16,781	4,910			697	22,388	217	22,605	27,535
Murewa South	MSE	ZANU	ZANU	10,808	45.91%	155 (Note: The runner up was an independent politician with 10,653 votes.)	84.81%	10,808	1,821			10,913	23,542	283	23,825	28,091
Murewa West	MSE	ZANU	ZANU	12,982	58.39%	6,766	83.67%	12,982	6,216	2,020	100	914	22,232	379	22,611	27,023
Musikavanhu	MCL	MDC–T	ZANU	6,559	41.62%	397	83.79%	6,559	6,162			3,039	15,760	476	16,236	19,376
Mutare Central	MCL	MDC–T	MDC-A	11,959	64.37%	6,275	84.92%	5,684	11,959	210		725	18,578	281	18,859	22,209
Mutare North	MCL	ZANU	ZANU	15,247	47.14%	6,940	86.47%	15,247	8,307		8,113	676	32,343	537	32,880	38,024
Mutare South	MCL	ZANU	ZANU	16,495	56.63%	6,445	82.42%	16,495	10,050		449	2,132	29,126	531	29,657	35,981
Mutare West	MCL	ZANU	ZANU	17,871	61.88%	9,951	84.67%	17,871	7,920			3,089	28,880	517	29,397	34,720
Mutasa Central	MCL	MDC–T	MDC-A	11,919	51.81%	2,298	86.43%	9,621	11,919	819		10,268	23,006	239	23,245	26,896
Mutasa North	MCL	ZANU	ZANU	11,913	46.77%	278	85.25%	11,913	11,635	0		1,925	25,473	425	25,898	30,378
Mutasa South	MCL	ZANU	MDC-A	14,783	52.15%	2,047	84.81%	12,736	14,783			826	28,345	281	28,626	33,752
Mutoko East	MSE	ZANU	ZANU	15,109	87.35%	12,920	88.82%	15,109	2,189				17,298	185	17,483	19,684
Mutoko North	MSE	ZANU	ZANU	16,902	83.20%	13,751	88.34%	16,902	3,151			262	20,315	283	20,598	23,318
Mutoko South	MSE	ZANU	ZANU	20,283	82.42%	16,444	85.51%	20,283	3,839	265		223	24,610	407	25,017	29,257
Muzarabani North	MSC	ZANU	ZANU	17,098	92.09%	15,937	88.71%	17,098	1,303 (Note: MDC-A fielded two candidates, acquiring 1,161 and 142 votes respectively.)			165	18,566	254	18,820	21,215
Muzarabani South	MSC	ZANU	ZANU	23,466	92.07%	21,862	89.75%	23,466	1,604			416	25,486	372	25,858	28,812
Muzvezve	MSW	ZANU	ZANU	23,833	71.79%	16,724	83.57%	23,833	7,109	1,449	104	705	33,200	663	33,863	40,520
Mwenezi East	MVG	ZANU	ZANU	22,926	83.89%	19,352	83.87%	22,926	3,574			828	27,328	564	27,892	33,256
Mwenezi West	MVG	ZANU	ZANU	26,778	92.73%	25,466	84.74%	26,778	1,312			787	28,877	691	29,568	34,894
Nkayi North	MBN	ZANU	ZANU	8,695	50.43%	2,598	82.93%	8,695	1,507	6,097		942	17,241	428	17,669	21,306
Nkayi South	MBN	MDC–T	ZANU	7,312	38.11%	665	80.55%	7,312	6,647	3,923	92	1,213	19,187	669	19,856	24,649
Nketa	BYO	MDC–T	MDC-A	12,799	54.22%	5,746	83.40%	7,053	12,799	1,045		2,709	23,606	297	23,903	28,659
Nkulumane	BYO	MDC–T	MDC-A	7,409	40.64%	3,149	84.41%	4,260	7,409	1,295	811	4,455	18,230	221	18,451	21,860
Norton	MSW	ZANU	IND.	16,857	55.98%	9,007	87.40%	4,255	7,850	566	173	17,266	30,110	221	30,331	34,703
Nyanga North	MCL	ZANU	ZANU	14,167	60.08%	7,417	84.94%	14,167	6,750		362	2,300	23,579	384	23,963	28,212
Nyanga South	MCL	ZANU	ZANU	12,322	51.10%	4,858	83.91%	12,322	7,464	1,114		3,214	24,114	654	24,768	29,518
Pelandaba-Mpopoma	BYO	MDC–T	MDC-A	7,059	49.04%	2,980	85.45%	4,079	7,059	1,464	88	1,704	14,394	198	14,592	17,076
Pumula	BYO	MDC–T	MDC-A	9,241	45.33%	4,591	82.49%	4,650	9,241	1,917	715	3,865	20,388	324	20,712	25,108
Redcliff	MID	ZANU	MDC-A	11,739	47.43%	419	85.10%	11,320	11,739		128	1,563	24,750	513	25,263	29,685
Rushinga	MSC	ZANU	ZANU	22,752	85.57%	20,446	89.71%	22,752	2,306		1,201	330	26,589	276	26,865	29,947
Sanyati	MSW	ZANU	ZANU	12,082	68.80%	7,330	85.18%	12,082	4,752		122	604	17,560	281	17,841	20,945
Seke	MSE	ZANU	ZANU	18,050	48.45%	1,681	84.25%	18,050	16,369			2,837	37,256	474	37,730	44,784
Shamva North	MSC	ZANU	ZANU	20,556	86.07%	17,869	89.41%	20,556	2,687		23	618	23,884	347	24,231	27,100
Shamva South	MSC	ZANU	ZANU	27,711	88.82%	24,794	91.07%	27,711	2,917	221	172	179	31,200	478	31,678	34,784
Shurugwi North	MID	ZANU	ZANU	17,467	63.91%	8,773	84.08%	17,467	8,694		73	1,095	27,329	443	27,772	33,030
Shurugwi South	MID	ZANU	ZANU	12,750	69.77%	9,832	83.86%	12,750	2,918			2,606	18,274	306	18,580	22,155
Silobela	MID	ZANU	ZANU	14,020	58.68%	7,959	84.97%	14,020	6,061	2,019		1,793	23,893	715	24,608	28,960
Southerton	HRE	MDC–T	MDC-A	9,073	61.02%	5,882	87.05%	3,191	9,073	1,138	187	1,281	14,870	153	15,023	17,257
St Mary's	HRE	MDC–T	MDC-A	10,219	40.57%	2,783	86.54%	7,436	10,219	1,888		5,647	25,190	304	25,494	29,460
Sunningdale	HRE	MDC–T	MDC-A	10,599	65.67%	6,461	87.14%	4,138	10,599	840		564	16,141	182	16,323	18,733
Tsholotsho North	MBN	MDC–T	ZANU	7,107	51.10%	2,250	78.91%	7,107	4,857	425	117	1,402	13,908	192	14,100	17,868
Tsholotsho South	MBN	ZANU	ZANU	8,283	54.03%	5,775	77.53%	8,283	2,508	1,628	167	2,743	15,329	315	15,644	19,653
Umguza	MBN	ZANU	ZANU	15,331	57.56%	8,675	83.01%	15,331	6,656	2,344	113	2,192	26,636	652	27,288	32,874
Umzingwane	MBS	ZANU	ZANU	11,630	55.43%	4,668	83.87%	11,630	6,962	1,005	154	1,229	20,980	478	21,458	25,585
Uzumba	MSE	ZANU	ZANU	21,405	92.04%	19,555	88.05%	21,405	1,850			0	23,255	468	23,723	26,944
Vungu	MID	ZANU	ZANU	11,350	55.25%	6,461	81.75%	11,350	4,889	1,764		2,541	20,544	453	20,997	25,685
Warren Park	HRE	MDC–T	MDC-A	18,725	68.75%	11,887	87.04%	6,838	18,725	654	58	960	27,235	199	27,434	31,520
Wedza North	MSE	ZANU	ZANU	13,785	79.22%	10,471	84.55%	13,785	3,314			303	17,402	259	17,661	20,887
Wedza South	MSE	ZANU	ZANU	9,525	80.06%	7,424	84.03%	9,525	2,101			272	11,898	152	12,050	14,340
Zaka Central	MVG	ZANU	ZANU	11,784	61.10%	4,844	83.14%	11,784	6,940			561	19,285	346	19,631	23,611
Zaka East	MVG	ZANU	ZANU	8,855	67.18%	5,051	84.06%	8,855	3,804			522	13,181	265	13,446	15,996
Zaka North	MVG	ZANU	ZANU	10,570	57.58%	5,062	83.20%	10,570	5,508	307	1,017	956	18,358	461	18,819	22,620
Zaka West	MVG	ZANU	ZANU	8,481	66.01%	5,214	83.02%	8,481	3,732 (Note: MDC-A fielded two candidates, acquiring 3,267 and 465 votes respectively.)		91	544	12,848	345	13,193	15,892
Zengeza East	HRE	MDC–T	MDC-A	11,658	53.56%	3,325	85.38%	8,333	11,658	783		9,327	21,768	255	22,023	25,793
Zengeza West	HRE	MDC–T	MDC-A	12,191	53.47%	6,952	85.61%	5,239	12,191	1,425		3,945	22,800	263	23,063	26,941
Zhombe	MID	ZANU	ZANU	13,377	56.04%	4,860	85.13%	13,377	8,517			1,977	23,871	380	24,251	28,486
Zvimba East	MSW	ZANU	ZANU	14,302	44.23%	1,008	85.68%	14,302	13,294		280	4,463	32,339	597	32,936	38,441
Zvimba North	MSW	ZANU	ZANU	20,308	82.87%	18,276	87.34%	20,308	2,032	860	159	1,148	24,507	545	25,052	28,684
Zvimba South	MSW	ZANU	ZANU	11,819	54.97%	7,841	85.84%	11,819	3,978			5,702	21,499	515	22,014	25,646
Zvimba West	MSW	ZANU	ZANU	6,902	39.66%	4,674	83.09%	6,902	2,228		1,936	6,337	17,403	253	17,656	21,248
Zvishavane Ngezi	MID	ZANU	ZANU	16,023	53.30%	2,471	85.64%	16,023	13,552			489	30,064	281	30,345	35,433
Zvishavane Runde	MID	ZANU	ZANU	14,362	74.96%	10,037	85.63%	14,362	4,325			473	19,160	306	19,466	22,734
Total for all constituencies							Turnout						Total Valid	Total Rejected	Total Cast	Total Voter Population
Total for all constituencies							Turnout	ZANU	MDC A	MDC-T	NPF	Other	Total Valid	Total Rejected	Total Cast	Total Voter Population
Total for all constituencies							Turnout	Votes								
Total for all constituencies							84.85%	2,493,522	1,648,767	144,679	53,755	421,762	4,762,485	79,821	4,842,306	5,706,681
Total for all constituencies							84.85%	51.49%	34.05%	2.99%	1.11%	8.71%	98.35%	1.65%	100.0%	5,706,681
Total for all constituencies							84.85%	Seats								
Total for all constituencies							84.85%	143 (Note: In the end, 144 ZANU-PF members took their seats in Parliament when it opened, due to the confusion around the Chegutu West seat being declared for ZANU-PF, in spite of MDC-A having won more votes.)	65 (Note: Only 64 MDC-A members took their seats in Parliament when it opened, due to the confusion around the Chegutu West seat being declared for ZANU-PF.)	0	1	1	210			
Total for all constituencies							84.85%	68.10%	30.95%	0%	0.48%	0.48%	100.0%			

==== Results by province ====
The provincial results below are based on the final Verified Results published by ZEC and are calculated using the combined constituency results above.

Constituency seat votes and share by Province
Province	Number of seats	ZANU-PF			MDC A			MDC–T		NPF			Others			Total
Province	Number of seats	Votes	%	Seats	Votes	%	Seats	Votes	%	Votes	%	Seats	Votes	%	Seats	Total
Bulawayo	12	53,887	25.2%	1	106,022	49.5%	11	18,284	8.5%	3,079	1.4%	0	32,839	15.3%	0	214,111
Harare	29	206,355	27.1%	1	438,323	57.5%	28	42,064	5.5%	1,629	0.2%	0	73,456	9.6%	0	761,827
Manicaland	26	302,919	49.6%	19	238,411	39.0%	7	12,537	2.1%	10,712	1.8%	0	46,726	7.6%	0	611,305
Mashonaland Central	18	361,866	77.5%	18	67,721	14.5%	0	2,369	0.5%	7,013	1.5%	0	27,707	5.9%	0	466,676
Mashonaland East	23	343,158	64.3%	21	144,795	27.1%	2	8,852	1.7%	100	0.02%	0	37,134	7.0%	0	534,039
Mashonaland West	22	306,149	55.9%	17	152,639	27.9%	4	9,566	1.7%	12,203	2.2%	0	66,689	12.2%	1	547,246
Masvingo	26	333,751	65.5%	25	130,893	25.7%	1	8,636	1.7%	2,854	0.6%	0	33,172	6.5%	0	509,306
Matabeleland North	13	108,673	39.7%	8	103,841	37.9%	5	26,094	9.5%	1,665	0.6%	0	33,769	12.3%	0	274,042
Matabeleland South	13	112,940	53.2%	12	64,426	30.3%	1	11,314	5.3%	2,360	1.1%	0	21,425	10.1%	0	212,465
Midlands	28	363,824	57.6%	22	201,696	31.9%	5	4,963	0.8%	12,140	1.9%	1	48,845	7.7%	0	631,468

=== Quota results ===
Results of the Quota seats by Province ZANU-PF MDC Alliance MDC-T

60 seats - 6 per Province - are reserved for women. These are allocated based on Proportional Representation following the Constituency election results.

Vote share and quota seat allocation by Province
Province	Party	Votes	%	Women Seats /6
Bulawayo	ZANU	53,887	25.2	2
Bulawayo	MDC A	106,022	49.5	3
Bulawayo	MDC–T	18,284	8.5	1
Harare	ZANU	206,355	27.1	2
Harare	MDC A	438,323	57.5	4
Manicaland	ZANU	302,919	49.6	3
Manicaland	MDC A	238,411	39.0	3
Mashonaland Central	ZANU	361,866	77.5	5
Mashonaland Central	MDC A	67,721	14.5	1
Mashonaland East	ZANU	343,158	64.3	4
Mashonaland East	MDC A	144,795	27.1	2
Mashonaland West	ZANU	306,149	55.9	4
Mashonaland West	MDC A	152,639	27.9	2
Masvingo	ZANU	333,751	65.5	4
Masvingo	MDC A	130,893	25.7	2
Matabeleland North	ZANU	108,673	39.7	3
Matabeleland North	MDC A	103,841	37.9	3
Matabeleland South	ZANU	112,940	53.2	4
Matabeleland South	MDC A	64,426	30.3	2
Midlands	ZANU	363,824	57.6	4
Midlands	MDC A	201,696	31.9	2

== Senate ==
60 seats - 6 per Province - are allocated based on Proportional Representation following the National Assembly Constituency election results. 18 seats are allocated for Chiefs, 2 from each Province, excluding the Metropolitan Provinces of Harare and Bulwayo, as well as the President and Deputy President of the National Council of Chiefs. The remaining two seats are allocated for persons with disabilities, who are voted for by the National Disability Board: one male and one female.

Seat allocation of the Senate ZANU-PF MDC Alliance MDC-T Chiefs Persons with disabilities

Results of the Senate seats by Province ZANU-PF MDC Alliance MDC-T

Vote share and Senate seat allocation by Province
Province	Party	Votes	%	Seats /6
Bulawayo	ZANU	53,887	25.2	2
Bulawayo	MDC A	106,022	49.5	3
Bulawayo	MDC–T	18,284	8.5	1
Harare	ZANU	206,355	27.1	2
Harare	MDC A	438,323	57.5	4
Manicaland	ZANU	302,919	49.6	3
Manicaland	MDC A	238,411	39.0	3
Mashonaland Central	ZANU	361,866	77.5	5
Mashonaland Central	MDC A	67,721	14.5	1
Mashonaland East	ZANU	343,158	64.3	4
Mashonaland East	MDC A	144,795	27.1	2
Mashonaland West	ZANU	306,149	55.9	4
Mashonaland West	MDC A	152,639	27.9	2
Masvingo	ZANU	333,751	65.5	4
Masvingo	MDC A	130,893	25.7	2
Matabeleland North	ZANU	108,673	39.7	3
Matabeleland North	MDC A	103,841	37.9	3
Matabeleland South	ZANU	112,940	53.2	4
Matabeleland South	MDC A	64,426	30.3	2
Midlands	ZANU	363,824	57.6	4
Midlands	MDC A	201,696	31.9	2
