= 10th Parliament of Zimbabwe =

←	9th Parliament
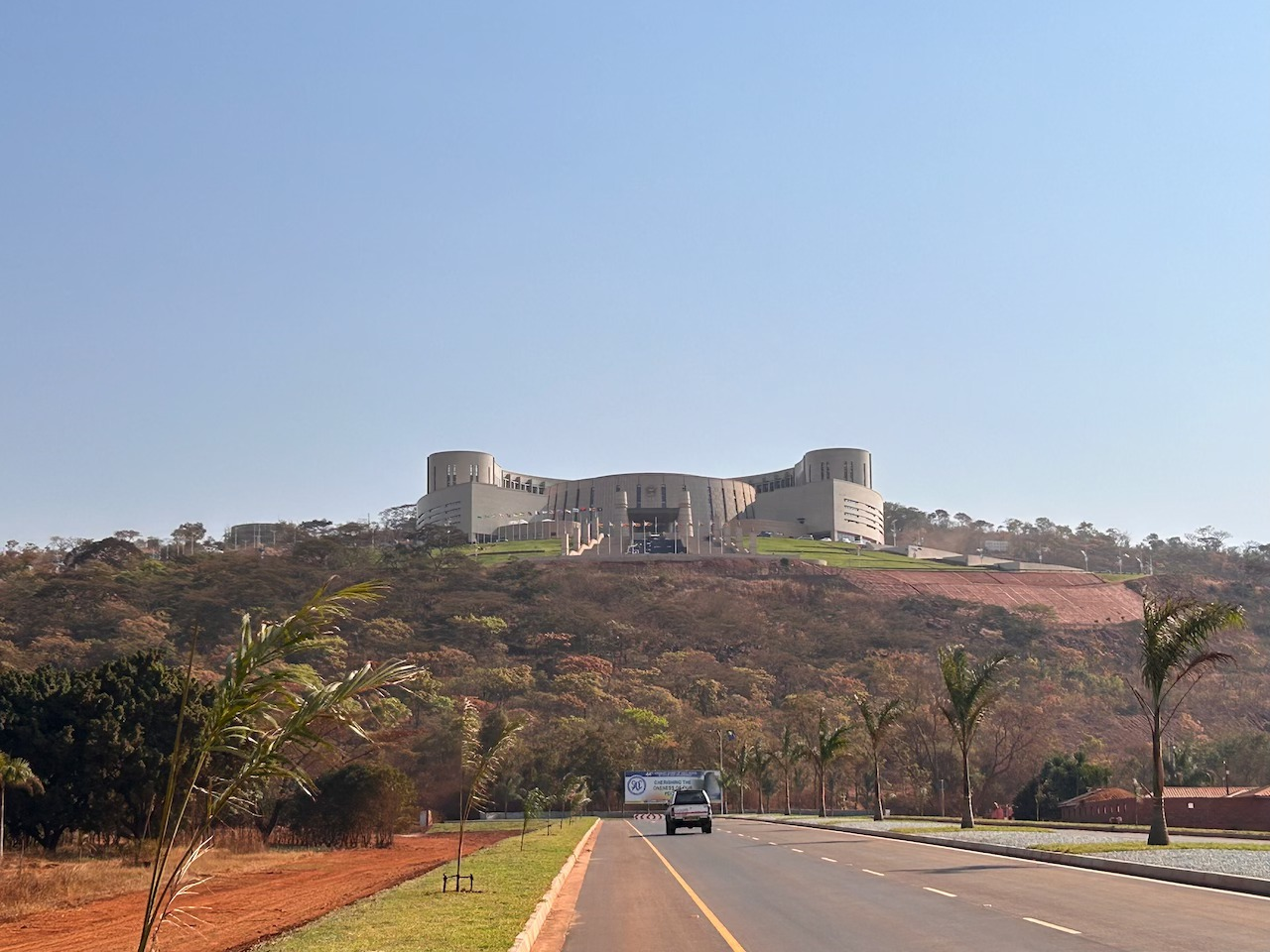
- Members were sworn in at the New Zimbabwe Parliament Building on 7 September 2023

Overview
- Legislative body: Parliament of Zimbabwe
- Jurisdiction: Zimbabwe
- Meeting place: Parliament House, Harare; New Zimbabwe Parliament Building, Mount Hampden
- Term: 4 September 2023; 3 years ago (Note: Under the Constitution of Zimbabwe, a new term of Parliament begins on the day that the President-Elect is sworn in following a general election. Members themselves were sworn in on 7 September 2023 and the first session was opened on 3 October 2023.) –
- Election: 2023 Zimbabwean general election
- Government: Third Mnangagwa Cabinet
- Website: parlzim.gov.zw

National Assembly
- Members: 280
- Speaker: Jacob Mudenda
- Deputy Speaker: Tsitsi Gezi
- Clerk: Kennedy Mugove Chokuda
- Party control: ZANU-PF

Senate
- Members: 80 → 90 (Note: Following the passage of the Constitution of Zimbabwe Amendment (No. 3) Act, 2026 in 2026, ten extra seats were created in the Senate for members appointed by the President.)
- President: Mabel Chinomona
- Deputy President: Michael Reuben Nyambuya
- Clerk: Kennedy Mugove Chokuda
- Party control: None (de jure); ZANU-PF (de facto) (Note: The Chiefs and Presidential nominees typically vote in line with ZANU-PF Senators.)

Sessions
- 1st: 3 October 2023 – 1 October 2024
- 2nd: 2 October 2024 – 23 October 2025
- 3rd: 28 October 2025 – 24 September 2026
- 4th: 29 September 2026 –

In Zimbabwe's 2023 general election, 210 members of the National Assembly were elected to the National Assembly – one for each parliamentary constituency. The Constitution of Zimbabwe provides for a further 60 female members, representing a women's quota, as well as a further 10 youth members' quota, made up of 10 candidates aged 21–35, chosen by proportional representation based on the constituency votes.

As part of the election, a new Senate was also elected. 60 members – six for each of Zimbabwe's 10 provinces – were elected by proportional representation, 16 traditional Chiefs were elected by the Council of Chiefs, while the President and Deputy President of the Council of Chiefs are automatically Senators. The final two seats in the Senate are made up of representatives of persons with disabilities, chosen by the National Disability Board.

The Zimbabwean Parliament comprises the elected National Assembly, the Senate and the President of Zimbabwe. The list of new parliamentarians was published in an Extraordinary edition of the Zimbabwe Government Gazette on 30 August 2023.

Following the passage of the Constitution of Zimbabwe Amendment (No. 3) Act, 2026, seats were created for 10 extra Senators, appointed by the President. President Mnangagwa made his first appointments to these new seats on 18 August 2026.

== National Assembly ==
=== Composition of the National Assembly ===
The National Assembly is made up of 280 members, as well as the presiding officer, known as the Speaker, who is elected at the Assembly's first sitting. A Member of the National Assembly who is elected as Speaker ceases to be a Member of the National Assembly, and the vacant seat must be filled in accordance with the Electoral Law.

74% of members selected for the National Assembly were either elected for the first time, or did not sit in the previous Parliament.

On 3 October 2023, a letter was sent to the Speaker of Parliament by Sengezo Tshabangu, who claimed to be the interim Secretary General of the Citizens Coalition for Change (CCC), stating that fifteen members (nine constituency MPs, five Women's Quota and one Youth Quota) of the National Assembly from the Citizens Coalition for Change (CCC) had ceased to be party members and therefore lost their membership of the National Assembly. The letter contained spelling mistakes, most notably spelling the word 'ceased' as 'seized'. The leader of the CCC, Nelson Chamisa subsequently wrote to the Speaker to inform him that the CCC did not have an 'interim Secretary General' position within their party and that only he was able to recall members. The Speaker subsequently acted on Tshabangu's letter and declared the seats of the supposedly-recalled MPs vacant on 10 October 2023 and notified the Zimbabwe Electoral Commission in line with the Constitution to prepare by-elections for the relevant constituencies. These by-elections were held on 9 December 2023.

On 7 November 2023, a further letter was sent to the Speaker of Parliament and the President of the Senate by Tshabangu. In this letter, he recalled a further six constituency MPs and 6 Women's Quota MPs, as well as five Senators. Their seats were declared vacant by the Speaker and President respectively on 14 November 2023. On the same day, the High Court ruled that any further recalls could not be acted upon by Parliament until legal challenges had completed. The Speaker, however, determined that the seats had been vacated when the letter was written – i.e. 7 November – and so remained vacant in spite of the Court order on 14 November.

Members
	Elected in September 2023				Current				
Constituency Maps									
Assembly composition									
Party	Common	Women	Youth	Total	Common	Women	Youth	Total	Change
ZANU–PF	136	33	7	176	154	33	7	194	▲18
CCC	73	27	3	103	56	27	3	86	▼17
Total	209	60	10	279	210	60	10	280	▲1
Vacant	1	0	0	1	0	0	0	0	▼1
Speaker	1				1				Steady
Government majority	73				108				▲35

=== Elected Constituency Members ===
210 members of the National Assembly are elected by secret ballot from the 210 constituencies into which Zimbabwe is divided. The following members were elected during the general election in September 2023.

Constituency	Party of incumbent at previous election	Member returned	Party of incumbent after election	Notes
Bulawayo Province
Bulawayo Central	MDC Alliance	Surrender Kapoikilu	CCC	
Bulawayo North	New constituency	Minehle Ntandoyenkosi Gumede	CCC	
Bulawayo South	ZANU-PF	Nicola Jane Watson	CCC	Candidate represented Bulawayo Central for MDC Alliance in previous Parliament. Seat declared vacant by the Speaker on 10 October 2023.
Cowdray Park	New constituency	Pashor Raphael Sibanda	CCC	Seat declared vacant by the Speaker on 10 October 2023.
Emakhandeni–Luveve	New constituency	Collins Discent Bajila	CCC	
Entumbane–Njube	New constituency	Prince Dube	CCC	
Lobengula–Magwegwe	New constituency	Ereck Gono	CCC	Seat declared vacant by the Speaker on 10 October 2023.
Mpopoma–Mzilikazi	New constituency	Desmond Makaza	CCC	Seat declared vacant by the Speaker on 10 October 2023.
Nketa	MDC Alliance	Obert Manduna	CCC	Seat declared vacant by the Speaker on 10 October 2023.
Nkulumane	MDC Alliance (2018)	Desire Moyo	CCC	Killed in car crash on 10 October 2025.
Nkulumane	CCC (2022)	Desire Moyo	CCC	Killed in car crash on 10 October 2025.
Pelandaba–Tshabalala	New constituency	Gift Siziba	CCC	Seat declared vacant by the Speaker on 14 November 2023.
Pumula	MDC Alliance (2018)	Sichelesile Mahlangu	CCC	Candidate reelected
Pumula	CCC (2022)	Sichelesile Mahlangu	CCC	Candidate reelected
Harare Province
Budiriro North	New constituency	Susan Matsunga	CCC	
Budiriro South	New constituency	Darlington Dzikamai Chigumbu	CCC	
Chitungwiza North	MDC Alliance	Godfrey Karakadzayi Sithole	CCC	
Chitungwiza South	MDC Alliance	Maxwell Mavhunga	CCC	Same candidate as previous election; candidate switched party allegiance
Churu	New constituency	Traswell Chikomo	CCC	
Dzivarasekwa	MDC Alliance	Edwin Mushoriwa	CCC	
Epworth North	New constituency	Togarepi Zivai Mhetu	CCC	
Epworth South	New constituency	Honour Mbofana Taedzwa	ZANU-PF	
Glen Norah	MDC Alliance (2018)	Wellington Chikombo	CCC	Candidate reelected
Glen Norah	CCC (2022)	Wellington Chikombo	CCC	Candidate reelected
Glen View North	MDC Alliance (2018)	Happymore Chidziva	CCC	
Glen View North	CCC (2022)	Happymore Chidziva	CCC	
Glen View South	MDC Alliance	Grandmore Hakata	CCC	Died on 23 January 2025.
Harare Central	MDC Alliance (2018)	Lovemore Jimu	CCC	
Harare Central	CCC (2022)	Lovemore Jimu	CCC	
Harare East	MDC Alliance (2018)	Rusty Markham	CCC	Candidate represented Harare South in previous Parliament for MDC Alliance. Resigned from Parliament on 31 January 2024.
Harare East	CCC (2022)	Rusty Markham	CCC	Candidate represented Harare South in previous Parliament for MDC Alliance. Resigned from Parliament on 31 January 2024.
Harare South	ZANU-PF	Trymore Kanupula	ZANU-PF	
Harare West	MDC Alliance	Joanah Mamombe	CCC	Same candidate as previous election; candidate switched party allegiance
Hatcliffe	New constituency	Agency Gumbo	CCC	Same candidate as previous election; candidate switched party allegiance
Hatfield	MDC Alliance	Rewayi Nyamuronda	CCC	
Highfield	New constituency	Donald Mavhudzi	CCC	
Hunyani	New constituency	Tongai Mafidi Mnangagwa	ZANU-PF	
Kuwadzana East	MDC Alliance (2018)	Chalton Hwende	CCC	Candidate reelected
Kuwadzana East	CCC (2022)	Chalton Hwende	CCC	Candidate reelected
Kuwadzana West	New constituency	Johnson Matambo	CCC	
Mabvuku-Tafara	MDC Alliance	Munyaradzi Febion Kufahakutizwi	CCC	Seat declared vacant by the Speaker on 10 October 2023.
Mbare	MDC Alliance	Sunungukai Martin Matinyanya	ZANU-PF	
Mount Pleasant	MDC Alliance	Fadzayi Mahere	CCC	Resigned from Parliament on 29 January 2024.
Southerton	MDC Alliance	Bridget Nyandoro	CCC	
St Mary's	MDC Alliance (2018)	Brighton Mazhindu	CCC	
St Mary's	CCC (2022)	Brighton Mazhindu	CCC	
Sunningdale	MDC Alliance	Maureen Kademaunga	CCC	
Warren Park	MDC Alliance	Shakespear Hamauswa	CCC	
Zengeza East	MDC Alliance	Goodrich Chimbaira	CCC	
Zengeza West	MDC Alliance	Innocent Zvaipa	CCC	
Manicaland Province
Buhera Central	ZANU-PF	Samson Matema	ZANU-PF	
Buhera North	ZANU-PF	Phillip Guyo	ZANU-PF	
Buhera South	ZANU-PF	Ngonidzashe Mudekunye	ZANU-PF	
Buhera West	ZANU-PF	Tafadzwa Mugwadi	ZANU-PF	
Chikanga	New constituency	Lynette Karenyi	CCC	
Chimanimani East	ZANU-PF	Joshua Kurt Sacco	ZANU-PF	Candidate reelected
Chimanimani West	ZANU-PF	Wilson Maposa	ZANU-PF	
Chipinge Central	ZANU-PF	Raymore Machingura	ZANU-PF	Candidate reelected
Chipinge East	MDC Alliance	Lincoln Dhliwayo	ZANU-PF	
Chipinge South	ZANU-PF	Clifford Hlatywayo	CCC	
Dangamvura	New constituency	Chapfiwa Prosper Mutseyami	CCC	Candidate represented Dangamvura/Chikanga for MDC Alliance in previous Parliament
Headlands	ZANU-PF	Farai Walter Mapfumo	ZANU-PF	
Makoni Central	MDC Alliance	Patrick Sagandira	CCC	
Makoni North	ZANU-PF	Joseph Muwombi	ZANU-PF	
Makoni South	ZANU-PF	Albert Nyakuedzwa	ZANU-PF	
Makoni West	ZANU-PF	Jenfan Muswere	ZANU-PF	Candidate reelected
Mutare Central	MDC Alliance	Brian Leslie James	CCC	
Mutare North	ZANU-PF	Admire Mahachi	ZANU-PF	
Mutare South	ZANU-PF	Tawanda Dumbarimwe	ZANU-PF	
Mutare West	ZANU-PF	Nyasha Marange	ZANU-PF	
Mutasa Central	MDC Alliance	Innocent Dambudzo Benza	ZANU-PF	
Mutasa North	ZANU-PF	Obey Bvute	ZANU-PF	
Mutasa South	MDC Alliance (2018)	Misheck Mugadza	ZANU-PF	Candidate reelected
Mutasa South	ZANU-PF (2022)	Misheck Mugadza	ZANU-PF	Candidate reelected
Mutema-Musikavanhu	New constituency	Angeline Gata	ZANU-PF	
Nyanga North	ZANU-PF	Chido Sanyatwe	ZANU-PF	Candidate reelected
Nyanga South	ZANU-PF	Supa Collins Mandiwanzira	ZANU-PF	Candidate reelected
Mashonaland Central Province
Bindura North	ZANU-PF	Kenneth Shupikai Musanhi	ZANU-PF	Candidate reelected
Bindura South	ZANU-PF	Toendepi Remigious Matangira	ZANU-PF	Candidate reelected
Guruve North	ZANU-PF	Tendai Pindukai	ZANU-PF	
Guruve South	ZANU-PF	Christopher Magomo	ZANU-PF	
Mazowe Central	ZANU-PF	Maxmore Njanji	ZANU-PF	
Mazowe North	ZANU-PF	Tsungai Makumbe	ZANU-PF	
Mazowe South	ZANU-PF	Nobert Tichaona Mazungunye	ZANU-PF	
Mazowe West	ZANU-PF	Kazembe Kazembe	ZANU-PF	Candidate reelected
Mbire	ZANU-PF	David Butau	ZANU-PF	
Mount Darwin East	ZANU-PF	Dzidzai Batau	ZANU-PF	
Mount Darwin North	ZANU-PF	Labbany Munemo	ZANU-PF	
Mount Darwin South	ZANU-PF	Kudakwashe Mupamhanga	ZANU-PF	
Mount Darwin West	ZANU-PF	Witness Jonga	ZANU-PF	
Muzarabani North	ZANU-PF	Soda Zhemu	ZANU-PF	Candidate reelected
Muzarabani South	ZANU-PF	Benjamin Kabikira	ZANU-PF	
Rushinga	ZANU-PF	Tendai Nyabani	ZANU-PF	Candidate reelected
Shamva North	ZANU-PF	Isac Chinodakufa	ZANU-PF	
Shamva South	ZANU-PF	Joseph Mapiki	ZANU-PF	
Mashonaland East Province
Chikomba East	ZANU-PF	Felix Tapiwa Mhona	ZANU-PF	
Chikomba West	ZANU-PF	Tatenda Mavetera	ZANU-PF	
Goromonzi North	ZANU-PF	Ozias Bvute	ZANU-PF	Candidate reelected
Goromonzi South	MDC Alliance	Stephen Chagwiza	CCC	Seat declared vacant by the Speaker on 14 November 2023.
Goromonzi West	ZANU-PF	Nyamupinga Biatah Karimatsenga	ZANU-PF	
Maramba Pfungwe	ZANU-PF	Tichawona Makuwi Karumazondo	ZANU-PF	Candidate reelected
Marondera Central	MDC Alliance (2018)	Caston Matewu	CCC	Candidate reelected
Marondera Central	CCC (2022)	Caston Matewu	CCC	Candidate reelected
Marondera East	ZANU-PF	Vimbayi Mutokonyi	ZANU-PF	
Marondera West	ZANU-PF	Godwin Tavaziva	ZANU-PF	
Mudzi North	ZANU-PF	Benjamin Musweweshiri	ZANU-PF	
Mudzi South	ZANU-PF	Jonathan Tawonana Samukange	ZANU-PF	Reelected
Mudzi West	ZANU-PF	Knowledge Kaitano	ZANU-PF	
Murewa North	ZANU-PF	Daniel Garwe	ZANU-PF	Candidate reelected
Murewa South	ZANU-PF	Noah Takawota Joni Mangondo	ZANU-PF	
Murewa West	ZANU-PF	Farai Jere	ZANU-PF	
Mutoko East	ZANU-PF	Richard Musiyiwa	ZANU-PF	Candidate reelected
Mutoko North	ZANU-PF	Caleb Makwiranzou	ZANU-PF	
Mutoko South	ZANU-PF	Isaac Tasikani	ZANU-PF	
Ruwa	New constituency	Thomas Muwodzeri	CCC	
Seke	ZANU-PF	Willard Tapfumanei Madzimbamuto	CCC	Seat declared vacant by the Speaker on 14 November 2023.
Uzumba	ZANU-PF	Wiriranai Muchemwa	ZANU-PF	
Wedza North	ZANU-PF	Itayi Ndudzo	ZANU-PF	
Wedza South	ZANU-PF	Tinoda Machakaire	ZANU-PF	Candidate reelected
Mashonaland West Province
Chakari	ZANU-PF	Andrew Nkani	ZANU-PF	Candidate reelected
Chegutu East	ZANU-PF	Webster Kotiwani Shamu	ZANU-PF	Candidate reelected
Chegutu West	ZANU-PF (Note: Although MDC-A officially won the vote count, due to a miscalculation on the day ZANU-PF was declared the winner, and the ZANU-PF member eventually took the seat in Parliament. The case was heard in court as Gift Machoka Konjana v Dexter Nduna.)	Admore Chivero	CCC	Seat declared vacant by the Speaker on 14 November 2023.
Chinhoyi	MDC Alliance	Leslie Everman Mhangwa	CCC	
Hurungwe Central	ZANU-PF	Richard Ziki	ZANU-PF	
Hurungwe East	ZANU-PF	Chenjerai Kangausaru	ZANU-PF	
Hurungwe North	ZANU-PF	Pax Muringazuva	ZANU-PF	
Hurungwe West	ZANU-PF	Chinjai Kambuzuma	ZANU-PF	
Kadoma Central	MDC Alliance	Gift Mambiripiri	CCC	
Kariba	MDC Alliance	Shine Gwangwaba	CCC	
Magunje	ZANU-PF	Supera Monga	ZANU-PF	
Makonde	ZANU-PF	Simbarashe Ziyambi	ZANU-PF	
Mhangura	ZANU-PF	Douglas Tendai Mombeshora	ZANU-PF	
Mhondoro-Mubaira	ZANU-PF	Chamunorwa Chiwanza	ZANU-PF	
Mhondoro-Ngezi	ZANU-PF	Tavengwa Mukuhlani	ZANU-PF	Candidate reelected
Muzvezve	ZANU-PF	Vangelis Peter Haritatos	ZANU-PF	Candidate reelected
Norton	Independent	Richard Tsvangirai	CCC	
Sanyati	ZANU-PF	Polite Kambamura	ZANU-PF	Candidate reelected
Zvimba East	ZANU-PF	Oliver Mutasa	CCC	Seat declared vacant by the Speaker on 14 November 2023.
Zvimba North	ZANU-PF	Marian Chombo	ZANU-PF	Candidate reelected
Zvimba South	ZANU-PF	Taurai Dexter Malinganiso	ZANU-PF	
Zvimba West	ZANU-PF	Mercy Maruva Dinha	ZANU-PF	
Masvingo Province
Bikita East	ZANU-PF	Court Zevezayi	ZANU-PF	
Bikita South	ZANU-PF	Energy Mutodi	ZANU-PF	
Bikita West	ZANU-PF	Daniel Nhatiso	ZANU-PF	
Chiredzi Central	New constituency	Ropafadzo Makumire	CCC	
Chiredzi East	ZANU-PF	Siyaki Mundungehama	ZANU-PF	
Chiredzi North	ZANU-PF	Royi Bhila	ZANU-PF	Candidate reelected
Chiredzi South	ZANU-PF	Joel Sithole	ZANU-PF	
Chiredzi West	ZANU-PF	Darlingtone Chiwa	ZANU-PF	
Chivi Central	ZANU-PF	Exevia Maoneke	ZANU-PF	
Chivi North	ZANU-PF	Huruva Godfrey Mukungunugwa	ZANU-PF	
Chivi South	ZANU-PF	Saul Maburutse	ZANU-PF	
Gutu Central	ZANU-PF	Winston Chitando	ZANU-PF	Candidate reelected
Gutu East	ZANU-PF	Benjamin Ganyiwa	ZANU-PF	Suspended from ZANU-PF and seat vacated as a result on 17 March 2025.
Gutu South	ZANU-PF	Pupurai Togarepi	ZANU-PF	Candidate reelected
Gutu West	ZANU-PF	John Paradza	ZANU-PF	Vote delayed to 11 November 2023 due to death of competing candidate
Masvingo Central	ZANU-PF	Eddison Mudiwa N Zvobgo	ZANU-PF	
Masvingo North	ZANU-PF	Brian Mudumi	ZANU-PF	
Masvingo South	ZANU-PF	Tanatsiwa Mukomberi	ZANU-PF	
Masvingo Urban	MDC Alliance	Martin Mureri	CCC	
Masvingo West	ZANU-PF	Ezra Ruvai Chadzamira	ZANU-PF	
Mwenezi East	ZANU-PF	Sheillah Chikomo	ZANU-PF	
Mwenezi North	New constituency	Master Makope	ZANU-PF	Candidate represented Mwenezi East in previous Parliament
Mwenezi West	ZANU-PF	Priscilla Moyo	ZANU-PF	Candidate reelected
Zaka Central	ZANU-PF	Davis Marapira	ZANU-PF	
Zaka North	ZANU-PF	Ophias Murambiwa	ZANU-PF	Candidate represented Zaka West in previous Parliament
Zaka South	New constituency	Clemence Chiduwa	ZANU-PF	
Matabeleland North Province
Binga North	MDC Alliance (2018)	Prince Dubeko Sibanda	CCC	Candidate reelected. Seat declared vacant by the Speaker on 10 October 2023.
Binga North	CCC (2022)	Prince Dubeko Sibanda	CCC	Candidate reelected. Seat declared vacant by the Speaker on 10 October 2023.
Binga South	MDC Alliance	Fanuel Cumanzala	CCC	
Bubi	ZANU-PF	Simelisizwe Sibanda	ZANU-PF	
Hwange Central	MDC Alliance	Fortune Daniel Molokela-Tsiye	CCC	Reelected
Hwange East	MDC Alliance	Joseph Bonda	CCC	
Hwange West	MDC Alliance	Vusumuzi Moyo	CCC	
Lupane East	ZANU-PF	Bright Vanya Moyo	CCC	Seat declared vacant by the Speaker on 10 October 2023.
Lupane West	ZANU-PF	Mxolisi Charles Sibanda	CCC	
Nkayi North	ZANU-PF	Sithembiso G Nyoni	ZANU-PF	Candidate reelected
Nkayi South	ZANU-PF	Jabualani Hadebe	CCC	
Tsholotsho North	ZANU-PF	Libion Sibanda	CCC	
Tsholotsho South	ZANU-PF	Musa Ncube	ZANU-PF	
Umguza	ZANU-PF	Richard Moyo	ZANU-PF	Candidate reelected
Matabeleland South Province
Beitbridge East	ZANU-PF	Albert Nguluvhe	ZANU-PF	Candidate reelected
Beitbridge West	ZANU-PF	Morgan Ncube	CCC	Seat declared vacant by the Speaker on 10 October 2023.
Bulilima	New constituency	Dingumuzi Phuti	ZANU-PF	
Gwanda North	ZANU-PF	Desire Nkala	CCC	
Gwanda South	ZANU-PF	Omphile Marupi	ZANU-PF	
Gwanda Tshitaudze	New constituency	Fisani Moyo	ZANU-PF	
Insiza North	ZANU-PF	Farai Taruvinga	ZANU-PF	Candidate reelected. Died on 31 March 2025
Insiza South	ZANU-PF	Spare Sithole	ZANU-PF	Candidate reelected
Mangwe	ZANU-PF	Vincent Sihlabo	CCC	
Matobo	New constituency	Edgar Moyo	ZANU-PF	Candidated represented Matobo North in previous Parliament
Matobo Mangwe	New constituency	Madalaboy Ndebele	CCC	
Umzingwane	ZANU-PF	Levi Mayihlome	ZANU-PF	Candidate reelected
Midlands Province
Chirumanzu	ZANU-PF	Barbara Rwodzi	ZANU-PF	Candidate reelected
Chirumanzu Zibagwe	ZANU-PF	Jacob Chokururama	ZANU-PF	
Chiwundura	MDC Alliance	Sleiman Timios Kwidini	ZANU-PF	
Gokwe Central	ZANU-PF	Daveson Masvisvi	ZANU-PF	
Gokwe Chireya	ZANU-PF	Torerayi Moyo	ZANU-PF	Candidate reelected
Gokwe Gumunyu	ZANU-PF	Steven Ngwenya	ZANU-PF	Candidate reelected
Gokwe Kabuyuni	ZANU-PF	Spencer Tshuma	ZANU-PF	
Gokwe Kana	ZANU-PF	Owen Ncube	ZANU-PF	Candidate reelected
Gokwe Mapfungautsi	ZANU-PF	Tawanda Karikoga	ZANU-PF	Candidate reelected
Gokwe Nembudziya	ZANU-PF	Flora Buka	ZANU-PF	
Gokwe Sengwa	ZANU-PF	Paul Mavhima	ZANU-PF	Candidate reelected
Gokwe Sasame	ZANU-PF	Madron Matiza	ZANU-PF	
Gweru Urban	MDC Alliance	Josiah Makombe	CCC	
Kwekwe Central	NPF (2018)	Judith Tobaiwa	CCC	Candidate reelected
Kwekwe Central	CCC (2022)	Judith Tobaiwa	CCC	Candidate reelected
Mberengwa Central	New constituency	Tinashe Shumba	ZANU-PF	
Mberengwa East	ZANU-PF	Tasara Hungwe	ZANU-PF	
Mberengwa West	ZANU-PF	Tafanana Zhou	ZANU-PF	
Mbizo	MDC Alliance (2018)	Corban Madzivanyika	CCC	
Mbizo	CCC (2022)	Corban Madzivanyika	CCC	
Mkoba North	New constituency	Amos Chibaya	CCC	Candidate represented Mkoba in previous Parliament. Seat declared vacant by the Speaker on 14 November 2023.
Mkoba South	New constituency	John Kuka	CCC	
Redcliff	MDC Alliance	July Moyo	ZANU-PF	
Shurugwi North	ZANU-PF	Joseph Mpasi	ZANU-PF	
Shurugwi South	ZANU-PF	Wilson Mhuri	ZANU-PF	
Silobela	ZANU-PF	Nyevera Jona	ZANU-PF	
Vungu	ZANU-PF	Brown Ndlovu	ZANU-PF	
Zhombe	ZANU-PF	Edmore Samambwa	ZANU-PF	Candidate reelected
Zvishavane Ngezi	ZANU-PF	Meeky Jaravaza	ZANU-PF	
Zvishavane Runde	ZANU-PF	Fred Moyo	ZANU-PF	

=== Women's Quota ===
An additional 60 women members, six from each of the provinces into which Zimbabwe is divided, are elected under a party-list system of proportional representation which is based on the votes cast for candidates representing political parties in each of the provinces in the general election for constituency members in the provinces.

Province	Member	Party	Notes
Bulawayo	Stabile Mlilo	CCC	Seat declared vacant by the Speaker on 10 October 2023.
Bulawayo	Jasmine Toffa	CCC	Reelected (Previously MDC Alliance). Seat declared vacant by the Speaker on 10 October 2023.
Bulawayo	Thokozani Khupe	CCC	
Bulawayo	Janeth Dube	CCC	Seat declared vacant by the Speaker on 10 October 2023.
Bulawayo	Samukeliso Maseko	CCC	
Bulawayo	Judith Mkwanda Ncube	ZANU-PF	
Harare	Ellen Shiriyedenga	CCC	
Harare	Juliana Makuvire	CCC	
Harare	Linnet Mazingaidzo	CCC	Seat declared vacant by the Speaker on 14 November 2023.
Harare	Gladys Kudzaishe Hlatywayo	CCC	
Harare	Nyasha Eunice Grace Chikwinya	ZANU-PF	
Harare	Mercy Mugomo	ZANU-PF	
Manicaland	Getrude Mutandi	ZANU-PF	
Manicaland	Patricia Kudhlande	ZANU-PF	
Manicaland	Univencia Amanda Chakukura	ZANU-PF	
Manicaland	Monica Mukwada	CCC	Seat declared vacant by the Speaker on 14 November 2023.
Manicaland	Miriam Matinenga	CCC	
Manicaland	Sekai Mungani	CCC	Seat declared vacant by the Speaker on 14 November 2023.
Mashonaland Central	Tsitsi Gezi	ZANU-PF	Reelected. Elected Deputy Speaker on 8 September 2023.
Mashonaland Central	Gertrude Chibagu	ZANU-PF	Reelected
Mashonaland Central	Barbra Tinotenda Thompson	ZANU-PF	
Mashonaland Central	Dorothy Mashonganyika	ZANU-PF	Reelected
Mashonaland Central	Elizabeth Shongedza	ZANU-PF	Reelected
Mashonaland Central	Bacillia Majaya	CCC	
Mashonaland East	Tabeth Murwira	ZANU-PF	
Mashonaland East	Lucia Mudzingwa	ZANU-PF	
Mashonaland East	Emily Jesaya	ZANU-PF	
Mashonaland East	Lilian Zemura	ZANU-PF	Reelected
Mashonaland East	Constance Chihota	CCC	Seat declared vacant by the Speaker on 14 November 2023. On 19 July 2024 the High Court of Zimbabwe instructed parliament to reinstate Chihota as she had been erroneously recalled.
Mashonaland East	Dephine Gutsa	CCC	Seat declared vacant by the Speaker on 14 November 2023.
Mashonaland West	Jennifer Nomsa Mhlanga	ZANU-PF	Reelected
Mashonaland West	Abygail Gava	ZANU-PF	
Mashonaland West	Nomsa Chaimvura	ZANU-PF	
Mashonaland West	Ruth Chari	ZANU-PF	
Mashonaland West	Mutsa Fransisca Murombedzi	CCC	
Mashonaland West	Consilia Chinanzvavana	CCC	Reelected (previously MDC Alliance)
Masvingo	Yeukai Simbanegavi	ZANU-PF	Reelected
Masvingo	Aliginia Samson	ZANU-PF	Reelected
Masvingo	Auxcilia Dhanzi	ZANU-PF	
Masvingo	Faith Makaza	ZANU-PF	
Masvingo	Machirairwa Mugidho	CCC	Reelected (previously MDC Alliance). Seat declared vacant by the Speaker on 14 November 2023.
Masvingo	Tendeukai Matara	CCC	
Matabeleland North	Sethulo Ndebele	CCC	
Matabeleland North	Francisca Ncube	CCC	Reelected (previously MDC Alliance)
Matabeleland North	Memory Linyane	CCC	
Matabeleland North	Mail Nkomo	ZANU-PF	Reelected
Matabeleland North	Lusyomo Nyelele	ZANU-PF	
Matabeleland North	Elizabeth Masuku	ZANU-PF	Reelected
Matabeleland South	Rossy Mpofu	ZANU-PF	Reelected
Matabeleland South	Evelyn Ndlovu	ZANU-PF	Reelected
Matabeleland South	Patricia Diana Ndudzo	ZANU-PF	
Matabeleland South	Nomatemba Ndlovu	CCC	
Matabeleland South	Velisiwe Nkomo	CCC	Seat declared vacant by the Speaker on 10 October 2023.
Matabeleland South	Sithabisiwe Moyo	CCC	
Midlands	Vairet Nhari	ZANU-PF	Reelected
Midlands	Perseviarance Zhou	ZANU-PF	Reelected
Midlands	Adionah Rutendo Mpofu	ZANU-PF	
Midlands	Tsitsi Zhou	ZANU-PF	
Midlands	Emma Shanziwe Muzondiwa	CCC	Seat declared vacant by the Speaker on 14 November 2023.
Midlands	Sekai Marashe	CCC	

=== Youth Quota ===
Beginning with the 2023 general election, a further 10 seats are reserved for youth members, that is, persons aged from 21 – 35 years of age, one from each of the provinces into which Zimbabwe is divided, elected under a party-list system of proportional representation which is based on the votes cast for candidates representing political parties in a general election for constituency members in the provinces.

Province	Member	Party	Notes
Bulawayo	Sivina Evidence Zana	CCC	Seat declared vacant by the Speaker on 10 October 2023.
Harare	Takudzwa Godfrey Ngadziore	CCC	
Manicaland	Stanley Sakupwanya	ZANU-PF	
Mashonaland Central	Emmerson Raradza	ZANU-PF	
Mashonaland East	Tawanda Titus Mudowo	ZANU-PF	
Mashonaland West	Mutsawashe Carl Ziyambi	ZANU-PF	
Masvingo	Naledi Lindarose Maunganidze	ZANU-PF	
Matabeleland North	Lovejoy Sibanda	CCC	
Matabeleland South	Tinashe Tafadzwa Mushipe	ZANU-PF	
Midlands	David Kudakwashe Mnangagwa	ZANU-PF	Son of President Emmerson Mnangagwa

== Senate ==
=== Composition of the Senate ===
The Senate is made up of 80 members, as well as the presiding officer, known as the President of the Senate, who is elected at the Senate's first sitting. A Senator who is elected as President of the Senate ceases to be a Senator, and the vacant seat must be filled in accordance with the Electoral Law.

On 4 October 2023, a letter was sent to the President of the Senate by Sengezo Tshabangu, who claimed to be the interim Secretary General of the Citizens Coalition for Change (CCC), stating that nine members of the Senate from the Citizens Coalition for Change (CCC) had ceased to be party members and therefore lost their membership of the Senate. The leader of the CCC, Nelson Chamisa subsequently wrote to the Speaker and the President of the Senate to inform them that the CCC did not have an 'interim Secretary General' position within their party and that only he was able to recall members. The President subsequently acted on Tshabangu's letter and declared the seats of the supposedly-recalled Senators vacant on 10 October 2023.

On 7 November 2023, a further letter was sent to the Speaker of Parliament and the President of the Senate by Tshabangu. In this letter, he recalled a further six constituency MPs and 6 Women's Quota MPs, as well as five Senators. Their seats were declared vacant by the Speaker and President respectively on 14 November 2023. On the same day, the High Court ruled that any further recalls could not be acted upon by Parliament until legal challenges had completed. The Speaker, however, determined that the seats had been vacated when the letter was written - i.e. 7 November - and so remained vacant in spite of the Court order on 14 November.

Following the passage of the Constitution of Zimbabwe Amendment (No. 3) Act, 2026, seats were created for 10 extra Senators, appointed by the President. President Mnangagwa made his first appointments to these new seats on 18 August 2026.

Senate composition			
Affiliation	Elected	Current	Change
ZANU–PF	33	33	Steady
CCC	27	27	Steady
Chiefs	18	18	Steady
Persons with disabilities	2	2	Steady
Presidential nominees	—N/a	10	▲10
Total	80	90	▲10
Vacant	0	0	Steady
President of the Senate	1	1	Steady

=== Provincial Seats ===
There are 60 provincial seats in the Senate. Six are elected from each of the provinces into which Zimbabwe is divided, under a party-list system of proportional representation which is based on the votes cast for candidates representing political parties in each of the provinces in the general election for Members of the National Assembly. Male and female candidates are listed alternately, with every list being headed by a female candidate.

Province	Senator	Party	Notes
Bulawayo	Helen Zivira	CCC	Reelected (previously MDC Alliance). Seat declared vacant by the President on 10 October 2023.
Bulawayo	Gideon Shoko	CCC	Reelected (previously MDC Alliance). Seat declared vacant by the President on 10 October 2023.
Bulawayo	Siphiwe Ncube	CCC	Reelected (previously MDC Alliance). Seat declared vacant by the President on 10 October 2023.
Bulawayo	Felix Magalela Sibanda	CCC	Seat declared vacant by the President on 10 October 2023.
Bulawayo	Ritta Ndlovu	CCC	
Bulawayo	Molly Ndlovu	ZANU-PF	Reelected
Harare	Miriam Katumba	CCC	
Harare	Webster Maondera	CCC	Seat declared vacant by the President on 14 November 2023.
Harare	Vongai Tome	CCC	Seat declared vacant by the President on 14 November 2023.
Harare	Jameson Zvidzai Timba	CCC	Seat declared vacant by the President on 14 November 2023.
Harare	Omega Sipani Hungwe	ZANU-PF	Reelected
Harare	Charles Zvidzayi Tawengwa	ZANU-PF	
Manicaland	Irene Zindi	ZANU-PF	
Manicaland	Michael Reuben Nyambuya	ZANU-PF	Reelected. Elected Deputy President on 8 September 2023.
Manicaland	Monica Mutsvangwa	ZANU-PF	Reelected
Manicaland	Keresencia Chabuka	CCC	Reelected (previously MDC Alliance). Died on 6 July 2024.
Manicaland	David Antony Chimhini	CCC	Seat declared vacant by the President on 10 October 2023.
Manicaland	Jane Chitsamba	CCC	
Mashonaland Central	Monicah Mavhunga	ZANU-PF	
Mashonaland Central	James Chafunga Makamba	ZANU-PF	
Mashonaland Central	Angeline Kumbirai Tongogara	ZANU-PF	Reelected
Mashonaland Central	Eleven Kambizi	ZANU-PF	
Mashonaland Central	Dorothy A Kadungure	ZANU-PF	
Mashonaland Central	Marry Grace Gwature	CCC	
Mashonaland East	Aplonia Munzverengwi	ZANU-PF	Reelected
Mashonaland East	Michael Chakanaka Bimha	ZANU-PF	
Mashonaland East	Bertha Chinyanga Garwe	ZANU-PF	
Mashonaland East	Conrad Jericho Gotora	ZANU-PF	
Mashonaland East	Maggie Ngwena	CCC	
Mashonaland East	Tapfumanei Wunganayi Muzoda	CCC	
Mashonaland West	Bybit Lydia Tsomondo	ZANU-PF	
Mashonaland West	Christopher Mutsvangwa	ZANU-PF	
Mashonaland West	Priscah Mupfumira	ZANU-PF	Reelected
Mashonaland West	Sikelela James Gumpo	ZANU-PF	Reelected
Mashonaland West	Editor Eremenziah Matamisa	CCC	Seat declared vacant by the President on 14 November 2023.
Mashonaland West	Tawanda Ralph Magunje	CCC	Seat declared vacant by the President on 14 November 2023.
Masvingo	Ottillia Muhlava Maluleke	ZANU-PF	Reelected
Masvingo	Lovemore Matuke	ZANU-PF	Reelected
Masvingo	Annah Rungani	ZANU-PF	
Masvingo	Robson Mavenyengwa	ZANU-PF	
Masvingo	Magie Chakabuda	CCC	
Masvingo	Godfrey Mativenga Madzikanda	CCC	Seat declared vacant by the President on 10 October 2023.
Matabeleland North	Anastasia Moyo	CCC	Seat declared vacant by the President on 10 October 2023.
Matabeleland North	Gabbuza Joel Gabuza	CCC	Seat declared vacant by the President on 10 October 2023.
Matabeleland North	Tendai Sibanda	CCC	Seat declared vacant by the President on 10 October 2023.
Matabeleland North	Alice Dube	ZANU-PF	Reelected
Matabeleland North	Obert Mpofu	ZANU-PF	Reelected. Withdrawn in October 2023 and replaced by Headman Moyo on 20 October 2023.
Matabeleland North	Rebecca Fanuel	ZANU-PF	
Matabeleland South	Tambudzani Bhudagi Mohadi	ZANU-PF	Reelected
Matabeleland South	Richard Ndlovu	ZANU-PF	
Matabeleland South	Esther Nyathi	ZANU-PF	
Matabeleland South	Nonhlanhla Mlotshwa	CCC	
Matabeleland South	Solani Moyo	CCC	
Matabeleland South	Meliwe Phuthi	CCC	Reelected (previously MDC Alliance)
Midlands	Tsitsi Veronica Muzenda	ZANU-PF	Reelected
Midlands	Frederick Makamure Shava	ZANU-PF	
Midlands	Maybe Mbohwa	ZANU-PF	Reelected
Midlands	Daniel Mackenzie Ncube	ZANU-PF	
Midlands	Sisasenkosi Ndebele	CCC	
Midlands	Sesel Zvidzai	CCC	

=== Chiefs' seats ===
Chapter 6, Part 3, §120(b) and (c) of the Constitution of Zimbabwe reserves 16 seats in the Senate for Chiefs, of whom two are elected by the provincial assembly of Chiefs from each of the provinces, other than the metropolitan provinces, and two for the President and Deputy President of the National Council of Chiefs.

Elected by Provincial Assembly of Chiefs for	Traditional Chiefs Name	Name of Chief	Notes
President of the Council of Chiefs (ex officio)		Lucas Mtshane Khumalo	Previously Deputy President
Deputy President of the Council of Chiefs (ex officio)		Fortune Charumbira	Previously President
Manicaland	Makumbe	Shepherd Gundu Chengeta	Reelected. Died on 31 October 2023.
Manicaland	Mapungwana	Annias Mapungwana	Reelected. Died 20 April 2026.
Mashonaland Central	Nyamaropa	Munyaradzi Tivaringe	
Mashonaland Central	Matsiwo	Chigwadzara Chinhenza	Reelected
Mashonaland East	Chikwaka	Witness M. Bungu	Reelected
Mashonaland East	Nechombo	Langton Chikukwa	Reelected
Mashonaland West	Ngezi	Peter Pasipamire	Reelected
Mashonaland West	Dandawa	Try Manyepa	
Masvingo	Chitanga	Felani Chauke	Reelected
Masvingo	Nhema	Ranganai Bwawanda	Reelected
Matabeleland North	Siansali	Siatabwa Nkatazo	Reelected
Matabeleland North	Mathupula	Khumalo Mandlakazulu	Reelected
Matabeleland South	Nyangazonke	Vuyani Ndiweni	Reelected
Matabeleland South	Masendu	Siandalizwe Dube	Reelected
Midlands	Ngungumbane	Zama Nthua Mkwananzi	Reelected
Midlands	Chireya	Henry Chidzivo	

=== Persons with disabilities ===
Chapter 6, Part 3, §120(d) of the Constitution of Zimbabwe reserves two seats in the Senate for representatives of persons with disabilities. In terms of paragraph 3(3)(b) of the Seventh Schedule to the Electoral Act [Chapter 2:13], one must be male, the other must be female. These Senators are elected by the National Disability Board.

Gender	Senator	Notes
Female	Annah Shiri	
Male	Ishumael Zhou	

=== Presidential appointees ===
The Constitution of Zimbabwe Amendment (No. 3) Act, 2026 introduced 10 seats in the Senate for members directly appointed by the President of Zimbabwe based on their professional skills and other competencies. The first appointments were made on 18 August 2026.

Appointee	Qualifications for Nomination	Notes
Jabulani Sibanda	Former President of the Zimbabwe National Liberation War Veterans Association	Appointed 18 August 2026.
Mary Mliswa	Former MP and ZANU-PF treasurer	Appointed 18 August 2026.
Nokuthula Matsikenyere	Former MP and Cabinet member	Appointed 18 August 2026.
Kudakwashe Tagwirei	Businessman	Appointed 18 August 2026.
Godwills Masimirembwa	Lawyer and founder of the Zimbabwe Institute of Legal Studies. Former MP.	Appointed 18 August 2026.
Lucy Chitaga		Appointed 18 August 2026.
Gibson Mashingaidze	Retired Major-General	Appointed 18 August 2026.
Makhosini Hlongwane	Former MP, cabinet minister and ZBC news reporter	Appointed 18 August 2026.
Brilliant Dube	Former president of Zimbabwe's National Students Union, and Director of Protocol in opposition CCC party	Appointed 18 August 2026.
Irene Mutumbwa		Appointed 18 August 2026.

== By-elections, replacements and recalls ==
=== Constituency by-elections ===
Constituency	Province	Date	Party of incumbent before vacancy	Outgoing member	Reason for by-election	Party of incumbent after election	Member returned
Bulawayo South	BYO	9 December 2023	CCC	Nicola Jane Watson	Seat declared vacant by the Speaker on 10 October 2023.	ZANU-PF	Raj Modi
Cowdray Park	BYO	9 December 2023	CCC	Pashor Raphael Sibanda	Seat declared vacant by the Speaker on 10 October 2023.	ZANU-PF	Aurther Mujeyi
Lobengula–Magwegwe	BYO	9 December 2023	CCC	Ereck Gono	Seat declared vacant by the Speaker on 10 October 2023.	CCC	Tendayi Chitura Nyathi
Mpopoma-Mzilikazi	BYO	9 December 2023	CCC	Desmond Makaza	Seat declared vacant by the Speaker on 10 October 2023.	CCC	Charles Moyo
Nketa	BYO	9 December 2023	CCC	Obert Manduna	Seat declared vacant by the Speaker on 10 October 2023.	ZANU-PF	Albert Tawanda Mavunga
Mabvuku-Tafara	HRE	8 December 2023	CCC	Munyaradzi Febion Kufahakutizwi	Seat declared vacant by the Speaker on 10 October 2023.	ZANU-PF	Pedzai Sakupwanya
Binga North	MBN	9 December 2023	CCC	Prince Dubeko Sibanda	Seat declared vacant by the Speaker on 10 October 2023.	ZANU-PF	Chineke Muchimba
Lupane East	MBN	9 December 2023	CCC	Bright Vanya Moyo	Seat declared vacant by the Speaker on 10 October 2023.	ZANU-PF	Phathisiwe Machangu
Beitbridge West	MBS	9 December 2023	CCC	Morgan Ncube	Seat declared vacant by the Speaker on 10 October 2023.	ZANU-PF	Thusani Ndou
Pelandaba-Tshabalala	BYO	3 February 2024	CCC	Gift Siziba	Seat declared vacant by the Speaker on 14 November 2023.	ZANU-PF	Joseph Tshuma
Goromonzi South	MSE	3 February 2024	CCC	Stephen Chagwiza	Seat declared vacant by the Speaker on 14 November 2023.	ZANU-PF	Washington Zhanda
Seke	MSE	3 February 2024	CCC	Willard Tapfumanei Madzimbamuto	Seat declared vacant by the Speaker on 14 November 2023.	ZANU-PF	Munyaradzi Tobias Kashambe
Chegutu West	MSW	3 February 2024	CCC	Addmore Chivero	Seat declared vacant by the Speaker on 14 November 2023.	ZANU-PF	Shakemore Wellington Timburwa
Zvimba East	MSW	3 February 2024	CCC	Oliver Mutasa	Seat declared vacant by the Speaker on 14 November 2023.	ZANU-PF	Kudakwashe Mananzva
Mkoba North	MID	3 February 2024	CCC	Amos Chibaya	Seat declared vacant by the Speaker on 14 November 2023.	ZANU-PF	Edgar Ncube
Mount Pleasant	HRE	27 April 2024	CCC	Fadzayi Mahere	Member resigned from Parliament on 29 January 2024.	ZANU-PF	George Mashavave
Harare East	HRE	27 April 2024	CCC	Rusty Markham	Member resigned from Parliament on 31 January 2024.	ZANU-PF	Kiven Mutimbanyoka
Glen View South	HRE	12 April 2025	CCC	Grandmore Hakata	Death of Member on 24 January 2025.	ZANU-PF	Tranquility Tsitsi Tawomhera
Gutu East	MVG	14 June 2025	ZANU-PF	Benjamin Ganyiwa	Member suspended from ZANU-PF on 17 March 2025.	ZANU-PF	Zvarevashe Masvingise
Insiza North	MBS	14 June 2025	ZANU-PF	Farai Taruvinga	Death of Member on 31 March 2025.	ZANU-PF	Delani Moyo
Nkulumane	BYO	21 December 2025	CCC	Desire Moyo	Member killed in car crash on 10 October 2025.	ZANU-PF	Freedom Phineas Murechu

=== Quota replacements ===
Quota	Province	Replacement Date	Party of incumbent before vacancy	Outgoing member	Reason for vacancy	Party of incumbent after substitution	Member returned
Women's	Bulawayo	1 March 2024	CCC	Stabile Mlilo	Seat declared vacant by the Speaker on 10 October 2023.	CCC	Nomvula Mguni
Women's	Bulawayo	1 March 2024	CCC	Jasmine Toffa	Seat declared vacant by the Speaker on 10 October 2023.	CCC	Otilia Sibanda
Women's	Bulawayo	1 March 2024	CCC	Janeth Dube	Seat declared vacant by the Speaker on 10 October 2023.	CCC	Lungile Ncube
Women's	Matabeleland South	1 March 2024	CCC	Velisiwe Nkomo	Seat declared vacant by the Speaker on 10 October 2023.	CCC	Sibongile Maphosa
Youth	Bulawayo	1 March 2024	CCC	Sivina Evidence Zana	Seat declared vacant by the Speaker on 10 October 2023.	CCC	Sikhuphukile Dube
Women's	Harare	12 April 2024	CCC	Linnet Mazingaidzo	Seat declared vacant by the Speaker on 14 November 2023.	CCC	Vivian Pamela Chitimbe
Women's	Manicaland	12 April 2024	CCC	Monica Mukwada	Seat declared vacant by the Speaker on 14 November 2023.	CCC	Batitsa Nyasha
Women's	Manicaland	12 April 2024	CCC	Sekai Mungani	Seat declared vacant by the Speaker on 14 November 2023.	CCC	Samantha Mureyani
Women's	Mashonaland East	12 April 2024	CCC	Dephine Gutsa	Seat declared vacant by the Speaker on 14 November 2023.	CCC	Diana Marikano
Women's	Masvingo	12 April 2024	CCC	Machirairwa Mugidho	Seat declared vacant by the Speaker on 14 November 2023.	CCC	Tsungirirai Rungwave
Women's	Midlands	12 April 2024	CCC	Emma Shanziwe Muzondiwa	Seat declared vacant by the Speaker on 14 November 2023.	CCC	Melphiner Gwabeni

=== Senate replacements ===
Quota	Province	Replacement Date	Representing	Outgoing member	Reason for vacancy	Representing	Member returned
Provincial	Matabeleland North	20 October 2023	ZANU-PF	Obert Mpofu	Withdrawn in October 2023.	ZANU-PF	Headman Moyo
Provincial	Bulawayo	1 March 2024	CCC	Helen Zivira	Seat declared vacant by the President on 10 October 2023.	CCC	Lilian Mlilo
Provincial	Bulawayo	1 March 2024	CCC	Gideon Shoko	Seat declared vacant by the President on 10 October 2023.	CCC	Kucaca Ivumile Phulu
Provincial	Bulawayo	1 March 2024	CCC	Siphiwe Ncube	Seat declared vacant by the President on 10 October 2023.	CCC	Linda Sibanda
Provincial	Bulawayo	1 March 2024	CCC	Felix Magalela Sibanda	Seat declared vacant by the President on 10 October 2023.	CCC	Collet Ndhlovu
Provincial	Manicaland	1 March 2024	CCC	David Antony Chimhini	Seat declared vacant by the President on 10 October 2023.	CCC	Maxwell Mdhluri
Provincial	Masvingo	1 March 2024	CCC	Godfrey Mativenga Madzikanda	Seat declared vacant by the President on 10 October 2023.	CCC	Sam Chapfudza
Provincial	Matabeleland North	1 March 2024	CCC	Anastasia Moyo	Seat declared vacant by the President on 10 October 2023.	CCC	Teresa Kabondo
Provincial	Matabeleland North	1 March 2024	CCC	Gabbuza Joel Gabuza	Seat declared vacant by the President on 10 October 2023.	CCC	Sengezo Tshabangu
Provincial	Matabeleland North	1 March 2024	CCC	Tendai Sibanda	Seat declared vacant by the President on 10 October 2023.	CCC	Grace Mumpande
Chiefs	Manicaland	24 July 2024	Makumbe	Shepherd Gundu Chengeta	Member died on 31 October 2023.	Mutasa	James Mutasa
Provincial	Harare	12 April 2024	CCC	Webster Maondera	Seat declared vacant by the President on 14 November 2023.	CCC	Murisi Zwizwai
Provincial	Harare	12 April 2024	CCC	Vongai Tome	Seat declared vacant by the President on 14 November 2023.	CCC	Tambudzai Kunaka
Provincial	Harare	12 April 2024	CCC	Jameson Zvidzai Timba	Seat declared vacant by the President on 14 November 2023.	CCC	Moses Manyengawana
Provincial	Mashonaland West	12 April 2024	CCC	Editor Eremenziah Matamisa	Seat declared vacant by the President on 14 November 2023.	CCC	Spiwe Munemo
Provincial	Mashonaland West	12 April 2024	CCC	Tawanda Ralph Magunje	Seat declared vacant by the President on 14 November 2023.	CCC	Tawanda Bvumo
Provincial	Harare	3 September 2024	CCC	Murisi Zwizwai	Death of Senator on 1 June 2024.	CCC	Kudakwashe Matibiri
Provincial	Manicaland	15 November 2024	CCC	Keresencia Chabuka	Death of Senator on 6 July 2024.	CCC	Midiah Kupfuma
Chiefs	Manicaland	11 June 2026	Mapungwana	Annias Mapungwana	Member died on 20 April 2026.	Makoni	Simbayi Cogen
