= 2023–2025 Zimbabwean by-elections =

2023/2024 by-elections in Zimbabwe

2023 Zimbabwean by-elections
- 11 November 2023; 9 December 2023

10 out of the 280 seats in the National Assembly (Note: Not all seats in the Zimbabwean Parliament are elected by popular vote. A selection is selected by Proportional Representation, and as such the number of seats after a by-election may be fewer than those being competed, where representatives have been recalled/died.)
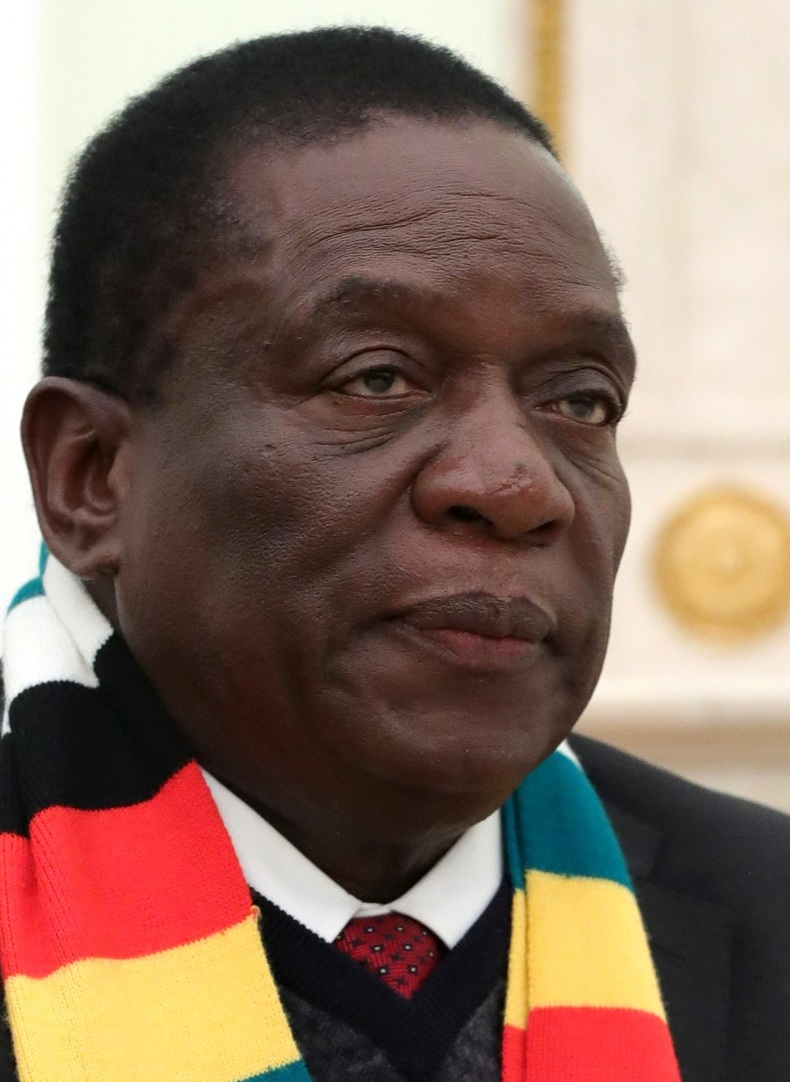

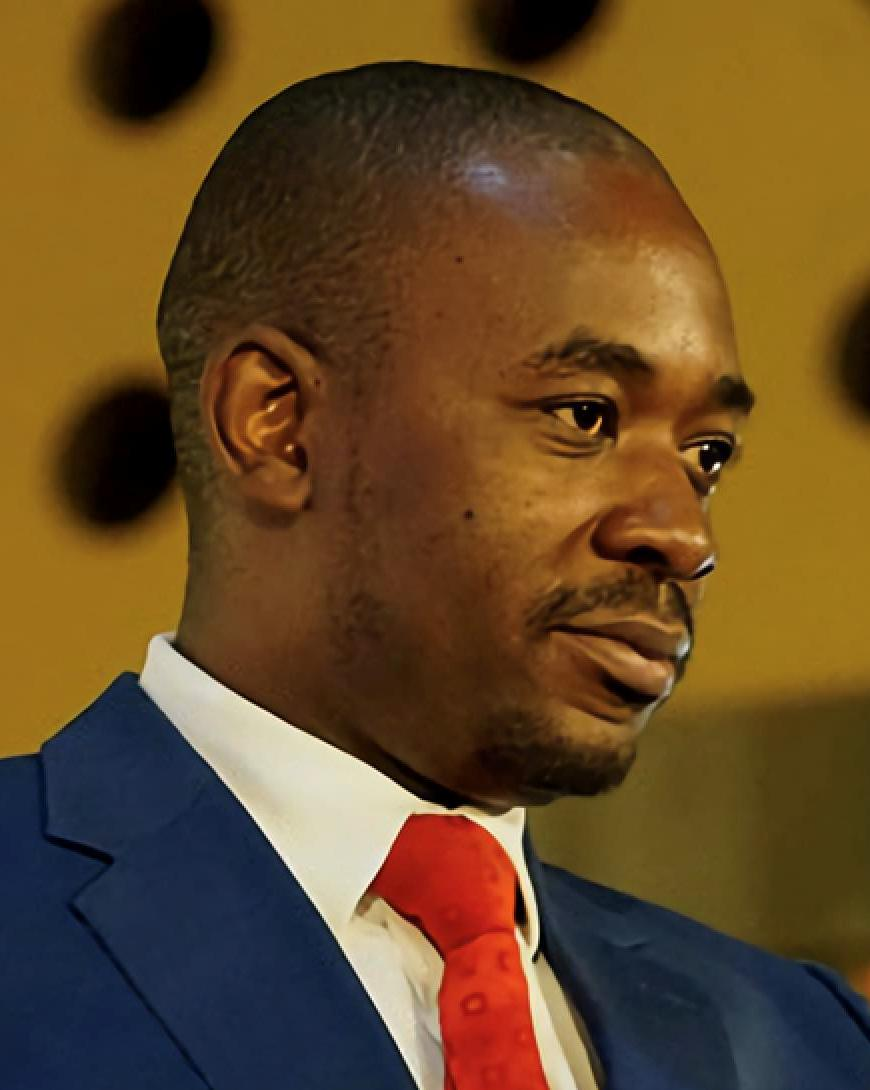
	Majority party	Minority party	Third party
Leader	Emmerson Mnangagwa	Nelson Chamisa
Party	ZANU–PF	CCC	ZAPU
Last election	176 seats, 56.11%	103 seats, 41.58%	0 seats, 0%
Seats after	184 seats	78 seats	0 seats
Seat change	▲8	▼25	Steady
	Fourth party	Fifth party
Leader	Lovemore Madhuku	Harry Peter Wilson
Party	NCA	DOP
Last election	0 seats, 0%	0 seats, 0%
Seats after	0 seats	0 seats
Seat change	Steady	Steady

2024 Zimbabwean by-elections
- 3 February 2024; 27 April 2024

8 out of the 280 seats in the National Assembly
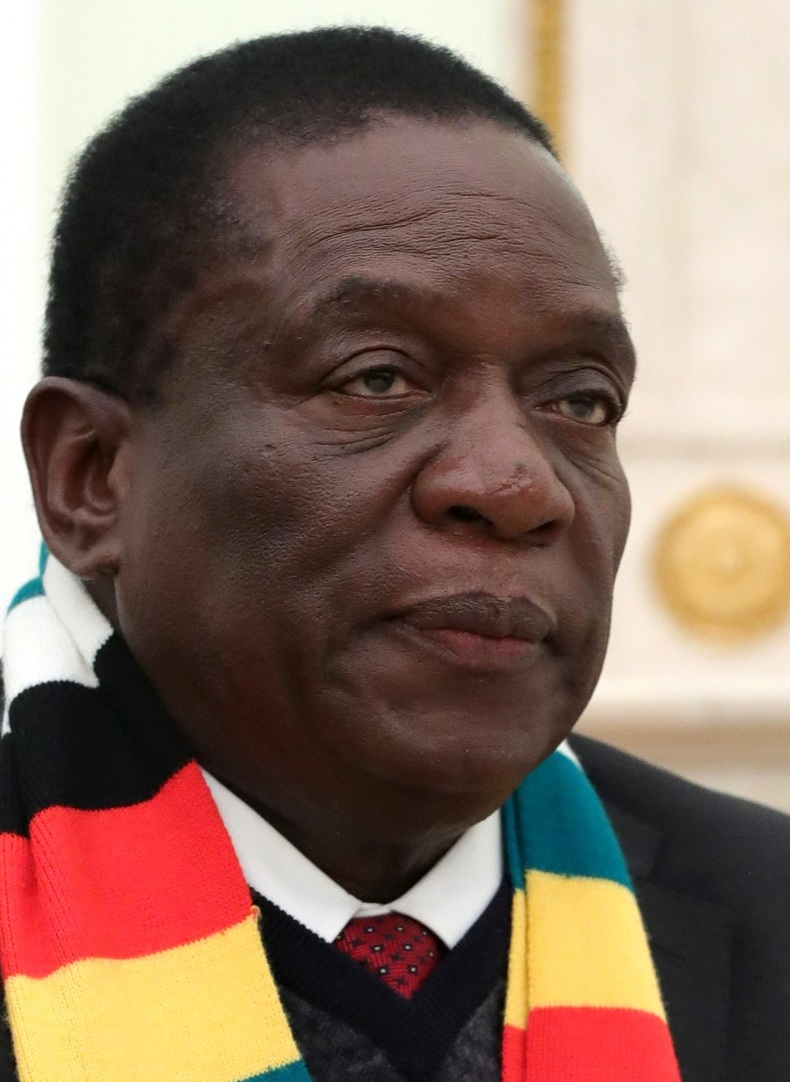
	Majority party	Minority party	Third party
Leader	Emmerson Mnangagwa	Unknown (Note: On 25 January 2024, Nelson Chamisa announced he was resigning from the CCC with immediate effect. It was not clear on the day of the by-election who the leader of the CCC was.)
Party	ZANU–PF	CCC	ZAPU
Last election	184 seats	78 seats	0 seats
Seats after	192 seats	78 seats	0 seats
Seat change	▲8	Steady	Steady
	Fourth party	Fifth party
Party	NCA	DOP
Last election	0 seats	0 seats
Seats after	0 seats	0 seats
Seat change	Steady	Steady

By-elections were held in Zimbabwe on 11 November 2023, on 9 December 2023, on 3 February 2024 and on 27 April 2024 to fill vacancies in the National Assembly and in local government. The by-elections were triggered by Sengezo Tshabangu, who claimed to be the interim Secretary-General of the Citizens Coalition for Change, when he recalled nine constituency legislators, six proportional representative women’s quota and senators and seventeen councilors mainly from Bulawayo, one of the party's strongholds.

== Background ==
=== Gutu West Constituency ===
Due to the death of independent candidate Christopher Mutonhori before the general election on 23 August 2023, the Zimbabwe Electoral Commission cancelled the parliamentary election in the Gutu West constituency in terms of Section 50 of the Electoral Act, which stipulates that should a candidate die before the election, the nominations are declared null and void. After the general elections, president Emmerson Mnangagwa proclaimed on 22 September 2023 that the by-election would be held on 11 November 2023.

=== Recall of CCC members ===
On 3 October 2023, Sengezo Tshabangu, who claimed to be the interim Secretary-General of the Citizens Coalition for Change, recalled 15 members of the National Assembly (9 constituency MPs, 5 women's quota MPs and 1 youth quota MP), 9 senators and 17 councilors mainly from Bulawayo. The CCC disputed Tshabangu's authority and the CCC president Nelson Chamisa wrote to National Assembly speaker Jacob Mudenda to disregard Tshabangu's letter.

In spite of Chamisa's protests, Mudenda wrote to the Zimbabwe Electoral Commission declaring the seats vacant, while the Local Government minister Winston Chitando notified the city councils about the vacant council seats. On 20 October 2023, president Mnangagwa proclaimed 9 December 2023 as the date for the by-elections. The Harare High Court rejected the expelled CCC MPs' appeal to be reinstated on 4 November 2023. On 7 November 2023, the Nomination Court sat to receive papers from candidates for the by-elections.

The CCC had been hit hard by double candidacy during the August general election, as Sengezo Tshabangu’s camp fielded its own set of candidates using the same party name.

On 7 November 2023, a further letter was sent to the Speaker of Parliament and the President of the Senate by Tshabangu. In this letter, he recalled a further six constituency MPs and 6 Women's Quota MPs, as well as five Senators. Their seats were declared vacant by the Speaker and President respectively on 14 November 2023. On the same day, the High Court ruled that any further recalls could not be acted upon by Parliament until legal challenges had completed. The Speaker, however, determined that the seats had been vacated when the letter was written - i.e. 7 November - and so remained vacant in spite of the Court order on 14 November. President Mnangagwa declared the date for the by-elections of these six constituencies to be 3 February 2024.

=== Political violence ===
In November 2023, Citizens Coalition for Change activist Tapfumaneyi Masaya was kidnapped and murdered while campaigning. This was just a fortnight after CCC lawmaker Takudzwa Ngadziore was reportedly abducted and tortured.

=== High Court challenges ===
At the Nomination Court proceedings, the recalled MPs submitted an application to stand in the by-elections as CCC candidates. While their applications were accepted, meaning that in some constituencies there would be two CCC candidates competing against each other, Tshabangu submitted an application to the High Court to bar the recalled MPs from standing as CCC candidates. On 7 December, just two days before the by-election, the High Court issued an order which barred the recalled MPs from standing as candidates, and further stated that their names should not appear on ballot papers.

=== Chamisa resignation ===
Chamisa withdrew from CCC ahead of by-election on 3rd of February 2024. Fadzayi Mahere and other withdrew from Parliament in solidarity with Nelson Chamisa, prompting a by-election in their respective constituencies.

== Results ==
=== 11 November 2023 ===
Constituency
Gutu West
Province
Masvingo
Reason for vacancy
Death of competing candidate during August general election
Results

Candidate	Party	Votes	%	+/–
John Paradza	ZANU-PF	12,147	79.30	+1.3
Martin Sebastine Mudzingwa	Independent	1,775	11.59	New
Ephraem Morudu	CCC	1,258	8.21	New
Robson Kurwa	NCA	138	0.90	New
Total		15,318	100.00	–
Valid votes		15,318	99.15	+1.22
Invalid/blank votes		132	0.85	-1.22
Total votes		15,450	100.00	–
Registered voters/turnout			60.2	-24.8
Majority		10,372	67.77	+6.30
ZANU-PF hold				

=== 9 December 2023 ===
Constituency	Province	Reason for vacancy	Results
Beitbridge West	Matebeleland South	Recall of incumbent legislator Morgan Ncube	Candidate / Party / Votes / % / +/–; Thusani Ndou / ZANU-PF / 4,929 / 88.81 / +42.62; Blessing Brendan Dube / Independent / 366 / 6.59 / New; Thoriso Moyo / ZAPU / 255 / 4.59 / New; ~~Morgan Ncube~~ / ~~CCC~~ / 0 / 0.00 / Barred; ~~Blessing Choeni~~ / ~~CCC~~ / 0 / 0.00 / Withdrew; Total / / 5,550 / 100.00 / –; Valid votes / / 5,550 / 94.76; Invalid/blank votes / / 307 / 5.24; Total votes / / 5,857 / 100.00; Majority / / 4,563 / 82.22 / +81.62; ZANU-PF gain from CCC
Binga North	Matebeleland North	Recall of incumbent legislator Prince Dubeko Sibanda	Candidate / Party / Votes / % / +/–; Chineke Muchimba / ZANU-PF / 9,862 / 90.77 / +33.42; Judith Sibanda / CCC / 1,003 / 9.23 / -47.28; ~~Prince Dubeko Sibanda~~ / ~~CCC~~ / 0 / 0.00 / Barred; Total / / 10,865 / 100.00 / –; Valid votes / / 10,865 / 93.35; Invalid/blank votes / / 774 / 6.65; Total votes / / 11,639 / 100.00; Registered voters/turnout / / 34,132 / 34.10; Majority / / 8,859 / 81.54 / +66.02; ZANU-PF gain from CCC
Bulawayo South	Bulawayo	Recall of incumbent legislator Nicola Jane Watson	Candidate / Party / Votes / % / +/–; Rajeshkumari Modi / ZANU-PF / 1,608 / 58.73 / +32.64; James Sithole / CCC / 1,130 / 41.27 / -31.53; ~~Nicola Jane Watson~~ / ~~CCC~~ / 0 / 0.00 / Barred; Total / / 2,738 / 100.00 / –; Majority / / 478 / 17.46 / -29.25; ZANU-PF gain from CCC
Cowdray Park	Bulawayo	Recall of incumbent legislator Pashor Raphael Sibanda	Candidate / Party / Votes / % / +/–; Aurther Mujeyi / ZANU-PF / 1,765 / 53.08 / +9.44; Vusumuzi Chirwa / CCC / 1,560 / 46.92 / -9.44; ~~Pashor Raphael Sibanda~~ / ~~CCC~~ / 0 / 0.00 / Barred; Total / / 3,325 / 100.00 / –; Valid votes / / 3,325 / 85.32; Invalid/blank votes / / 572 / 14.68; Total votes / / 3,897 / 100.00; Registered voters/turnout / / 27,638 / 14.10; Majority / / 205 / 6.17 / -6.55; ZANU-PF gain from CCC
Lobengula-Magwegwe	Bulawayo	Recall of incumbent legislator Ereck Gono	Candidate / Party / Votes / % / +/–; Tendayi Chitura Nyathi / CCC / 1,648 / 55.56 / -15.14; Menziwa Dube / ZANU-PF / 1,318 / 44.44 / +27.66; ~~Ereck Gono~~ / ~~CCC~~ / 0 / 0.00 / Barred; Total / / 2,966 / 100.00 / –; Valid votes / / 2,966 / 86.65; Invalid/blank votes / / 457 / 13.35; Total votes / / 3,423 / 100.00; Registered voters/turnout / / 25,544 / 13.40; Majority / / 330 / 11.12 / -42.81; CCC hold
Lupane East	Matebeleland South	Recall of incumbent legislator Bright Vanya Moyo	Candidate / Party / Votes / % / +/–; Phathisiwe Machangu / ZANU-PF / 6,863 / 79.68 / +34.35; David Nyathi / CCC / 1,750 / 20.32 / -26.77; ~~Bright Vanya Moyo~~ / ~~CCC~~ / 0 / 0.00 / Barred; Total / / 8,613 / 100.00 / –; Majority / / 5,113 / 59.36 / +57.65; ZANU-PF gain from CCC
Mabvuku-Tafara	Harare	Recall of incumbent legislator Munyaradzi Kufahakutizwi	2023 Mabvuku-Tafara by-election: Party / Candidate / Votes / % / ±%; ZANU–PF / Pedzai Sakupwanya / Unopposed; Total votes / / —N/a / 100.0; ZANU–PF gain from CCC
Mpopoma-Mzilikazi	Bulawayo	Recall of incumbent legislator Desmond Makaza	Candidate / Party / Votes / % / +/–; Charles Moyo / CCC / 1,632 / 47.58 / -26.91; Dzingai Kamamba / ZANU-PF / 1,097 / 31.98 / +15.21; Pardon Tapfumaneyi / Independent / 654 / 19.07 / +15.14; Blessings Sibanda / DOP / 47 / 1.37 / +1; ~~Desmond Makaza~~ / ~~CCC~~ / 0 / 0.00 / Barred; Total / / 3,430 / 100.00 / –; Valid votes / / 3,430 / 86.86; Invalid/blank votes / / 519 / 13.14; Total votes / / 3,949 / 100.00; Registered voters/turnout / / / –; Majority / / 535 / 15.6 / -42.12; CCC hold
Nketa	Bulawayo	Recall of incumbent legislator Obert Manduna	Candidate / Party / Votes / % / +/–; Albert Tawanda Mavunga / ZANU-PF / 1,550 / 49.90 / +32.32; Ambrose Sibindi / CCC / 1,439 / 46.33 / -26.61; Luckmore Gwetu / DOP / 117 / 3.77 / New; ~~Obert Manduna~~ / ~~CCC~~ / 0 / 0.00 / Barred; Total / / 3,106 / 100.00 / –; Valid votes / / 3,106 / 90.55; Invalid/blank votes / / 324 / 9.45; Total votes / / 3,430 / 100.00; Registered voters/turnout / / 24,020 / 14.28; Majority / / 111 / 3.57 / -51.79; ZANU-PF gain from CCC

=== 3 February 2024 ===
Constituency	Province	Reason for vacancy	Results
Seke	Mashonaland East	Recall of incumbent legislator Willard Tapfumanei Madzimbamuto	Candidate / Party / Votes / % / +/–; Munyaradzi Tobias Kashambe / ZANU-PF / 8,586 / 73.66 / +25.46; Willard Tapfumanei Madzimbamuto / Independent / 2,401 / 20.60 / New; Everisto Chisi / CCC / 669 / 5.74 / -45.16; Total / / 11,656 / 100.00 / –; Valid votes / / 11,656 / 97.38; Invalid/blank votes / / 313 / 2.62; Total votes / / 11,969 / 100.00; Registered voters/turnout / / 39,659 / 30.18; Majority / / 6,185 / 53.06 / +50.32; ZANU-PF gain from CCC
Goromonzi South	Mashonaland East	Recall of incumbent legislator Stephen Chagwiza	Candidate / Party / Votes / % / +/–; Washington Zhanda / ZANU-PF / 6,865 / 86.55 / +38.92; Reuben Chikudo / CCC / 1,067 / 13.45 / 37.65; Total / / 7,932 / 100.00 / –; Valid votes / / 7,932 / 95.55; Invalid/blank votes / / 369 / 4.45; Total votes / / 8,301 / 100.00; Registered voters/turnout / / 45,862 / 18.10; Majority / / 5,798 / 73.1 / +22; ZANU-PF gain from CCC
Pelandaba–Tshabalala	Bulawayo	Recall of incumbent legislator Gift Siziba	Candidate / Party / Votes / % / +/–; Joseph Tshuma / ZANU-PF / 1,845 / 74.85 / +53.22; Moreblessing Tembo / CCC / 464 / 18.82 / -28.78; Yona Abraham Nkomo / DOP / 156 / 6.33 / +5.10; Total / / 2,465 / 100.00 / –; Valid votes / / 2,465 / 92.08; Invalid/blank votes / / 212 / 7.92; Total votes / / 2,677 / 100.00; Registered voters/turnout / / 22,822 / 11.73; Majority / / 1,381 / 56.02 / +8.42; ZANU-PF gain from CCC
Chegutu West	Mashonaland West	Recall of incumbent legislator Admore Chivero	Candidate / Party / Votes / % / +/–; Shakemore Wellington Timburwa / ZANU-PF / 6,697 / 67.03 / +24.39; Admore Chivero / Independent / 2,626 / 26.28 / New; Gift Machoka Koniana / CCC / 668 / 6.69 / -45.89; Total / / 9,991 / 100.00 / –; Majority / / 4,071 / 40.75 / +30.82; ZANU-PF gain from CCC
Zvimba East	Mashonaland West	Recall of incumbent legislator Oliver Mutasa	Candidate / Party / Votes / % / +/–; Kudakwashe Mananzva / ZANU-PF / 10,359 / 78.44 / +28.75; Oliver Mutasa / Independent / 1,992 / 15.08 / New; Agrippa Alberito / CCC / 855 / 6.47 / -43.84; Total / / 13,206 / 100.00 / –; Valid votes / / 13,206 / 98.05; Invalid/blank votes / / 262 / 1.95; Total votes / / 13,468 / 100.00; Registered voters/turnout / / 42,620 / 31.6; Majority / / 8,367 / 63.36 / +62.74; ZANU-PF gain from CCC
Mkoba North	Midlands Province	Recall of incumbent legislator Amos Chibaya	Candidate / Party / Votes / % / +/–; Edgar Ncube / ZANU-PF / 2,415 / 59.22 / +31.52; Patrick Tayiya / DOP / 1,663 / 40.78 / New; Total / / 4,078 / 100.00 / –; Valid votes / / 4,078 / 95.66; Invalid/blank votes / / 185 / 4.34; Total votes / / 4,263 / 100.00; Registered voters/turnout / / 30,320 / 14.06; Majority / / 752 / 18.44 / -24.75; ZANU-PF gain from CCC

=== 27 April 2024 ===
Constituency
Province
Reason for vacancy
Results
Harare East
Harare
Resignation of incumbent legislator Rusty Markham

Candidate	Party	Votes	%	+/–
Kiven Mutimbanyoka	ZANU-PF	3,533	64.15	+33.02
Ropafadzo Cynthia Cheza	Independent	1,974	35.85	New
Total		5,507	100.00	–
Valid votes		5,507	99.08	
Invalid/blank votes		51	0.92	
Total votes		5,558	100.00	
Registered voters/turnout		36,566	15.20	
Majority		1,559	35.68	+2.92
ZANU-PF gain from CCC				

Mount Pleasant
Harare
Resignation of incumbent legislator Fadzayi Mahere

Candidate	Party	Votes	%	+/–
George Mashavave	ZANU-PF	3,205	73.34	+43.57
Nason Mamuse	Independent	945	21.62	New
Brian Ticky	Independent	220	5.03	New
Total		4,370	100.00	–
Valid votes		4,370	95.50	
Invalid/blank votes		206	4.50	
Total votes		4,576	100.00	
Registered voters/turnout		39,448	11.60	
Majority		2,260	51.72	+32.32
ZANU-PF gain from CCC				
