= Mavunga =

Mavunga is a Zimbabwean surname. Notable people with the surname include:

- Albert Mavunga, a Zimbabwean politician
- Julian Mavunga, a Zimbabwean-American basketball player
- Leeroy Mavunga, a Zimbabwean footballer
- Stephanie Mavunga, Zimbabwean-born American and Polish professional basketball player
