= Desire Moyo =

Zimbabwean politician (1979–2025)

The Hon. Desire Moyo MP

Member of Parliament for Nkulumane
- In office 7 September 2023 – 10 October 2025
- President: Emmerson Mnangagwa
- Preceded by: Kucaca Ivumile Phulu
- Majority: 7,478 (56.8%)

Personal details
- Born: 11 October 1979
- Died: 10 October 2025 (aged 45)
- Political party: Citizens Coalition for Change

Desire Moyo (11 October 1979 – 10 October 2025) was a Zimbabwean politician from the Citizens Coalition for Change. In the 2023 Zimbabwean general election, he was elected MP for Nkulumane.

On 10 October 2025, he was killed after his car collided with an elephant on the Bulawayo-Gweru highway. He was 45.

== See also ==
- List of members of the 10th Parliament of Zimbabwe
