= Ereck Gono =

Zimbabwean politician

Member of the National Assembly of Zimbabwe for Lobengula–Magwegwe
- In office 7 September 2023 – 3 October 2023
- Preceded by: New seat
- Succeeded by: Tendayi Chitura (elect)

Personal details
- Party: Citizens Coalition for Change

Ereck Gono is a Zimbabwean politician who was elected to the National Assembly of Zimbabwe in the 2023 general election for the constituency of Lobengula–Magwegwe as a member of the Citizens Coalition for Change. On 3 October 2023, he and fourteen other CCC MPs were recalled as MPs following a letter by Sengezo Tshabangu, who claimed to be the interim Secretary-General of the party. Gono and other MPs disputed the cessation of their CCC party membership and registered to contest the by-elections in their constituencies on 9 December 2023. On 7 December 2023, two days before the by-elections, Gono and the other recalled MPs were barred from contesting the by-elections.
