= Brighton Mazhindu =

Zimbabwean politician and member of parliament

Member of the National Assembly of Zimbabwe
- Incumbent
- Assumed office 2018
- Constituency: St Mary's

Personal details
- Party: Citizens Coalition for Change

Brighton Mazhindu is a Zimbabwean politician from the Citizens Coalition for Change who has been a member of the Parliament of Zimbabwe since 2018.

== See also ==
- 10th Parliament of Zimbabwe
