= Tapfumaneyi Masaya =

Zimbabwean bishop and political activist (1971/1972–2023)

Tapfumaneyi Masaya (1971/1972 – 14 November 2023) was a Zimbabwean bishop and political activist from the Citizens Coalition for Change.

== Biography ==
Masaya was kidnapped in November 2023 while campaigning for the upcoming by-elections. He was later found murdered. This was just a fortnight after CCC lawmaker Takudzwa Ngadziore was reportedly abducted and tortured.
