= Prince Dubeko Sibanda =

Zimbabwean politician

Member of the National Assembly of Zimbabwe for Binga North
- In office 5 April 2022 – 3 October 2023
- In office 4 September 2018 – 1 October 2020

Personal details
- Party: Citizens Coalition for Change

Prince Dubeko Sibanda is a Zimbabwean politician who was elected in the 2018 general election to represent the constituency of Binga North in the National Assembly as a member of the MDC Alliance. He was recalled as an MP by MDC-T Secretary General Douglas Mwonzora in October 2020. Sibanda joined the Citizens Coalition for Change and won the seat back in a by-election on 26 March 2022.

Sibanda was re-elected the MP for Binga North in the 2023 general election. Shortly afterwards, he and a group of CCC MPs were recalled by Sengezo Tshabangu, who claimed to be the party’s interim Secretary-General . Sibanda registered to stand in the by-election in his constituency scheduled for 9 December 2023, but was barred from contesting by the Harare High Court.
