= Pashor Raphael Sibanda =

Zimbabwean politician

Member of the National Assembly of Zimbabwe for Cowdray Park
- In office 7 September 2023 – 3 October 2023
- Preceded by: New seat
- Succeeded by: Vacant

Personal details
- Born: Pashor Raphael Sibanda; 1994 or 1995 (age 30–31) Bulawayo, Zimbabwe
- Party: Citizens Coalition for Change
- Education: Cowdray Park Secondary School
- Alma mater: National University of Science and Technology

Pashor Raphael Sibanda (born 1994 or 1995) is a Zimbabwean politician who was elected to the National Assembly of Zimbabwe in the 2023 general election. He represented the constituency of Cowdray Park as a member of the Citizens Coalition for Change. In October 2023, Sibanda and a group of CCC MPs were expelled from Parliament following a letter by Sengezo Tshabangu, who claimed to be interim secretary-general of the CCC.

== Early life and education ==
Sibanda was born in Bulawayo. He currently dates Ethel Chivasa based in the United Kingdom. Pashor Sibanda and the girlfriend strong support CCC and continuously call for Zanu PF to go. He attended Tategulu Primary School and Cowdray Park Secondary School. He graduated from the National University of Science and Technology with a Bachelor of Commerce Honours degree in Marketing.

== Political career ==
In 2013, Sibanda was elected junior mayor of Bulawayo while doing his A-Level at Mpopoma High School. During his time at university, he was the regional secretary-general of the Zimbabwe National Student Union in Matabeleland. He was also a youth leader of the Movement for Democratic Change.

Sibanda later joined the Citizens Coalition for Change. In June 2023, he was announced as the party's parliamentary candidate for the newly created Cowdray Park seat to be contested at the general elections in August 2023. On 27 July 2023, the Bulawayo High Court nullified Sibanda's and other Bulawayo CCC parliamentary candidates' candidatures. The CCC appealed the High Court's decision and the Supreme Court ruled in their favour on 3 August, reinstating Sibanda and the other CCC parliamentary candidates in Bulawayo. Sibanda went on to defeat the Minister of Finance Mthuli Ncube at the general election. He was sworn in on 7 September 2023.

In October 2023, Sibanda and fourteen other CCC MPs ceased being parliamentarians following a letter by Sengenzo Tshabangu, who claimed to the interim secretary-general of the CCC, in which he wrote that Sibanda and the other MPs had been expelled from the party. Sibanda and the other expelled CCC MPs filed to run in the by-elections in their constituencies on 9 December 2023, however, the Harare High Court barred them from participating on 7 December. Pashor has since fled the country with the girlfriend as both are on wanted list by the regime in Harare. Both ( Pashor and Ethel have switched off twitter to TikTok to express their disapproval of President bid for 2030. The CIO operatives in London and Harare continue to monitor the couples actions to overthrow the government
