= Beitbridge West =

Constituency of the Parliament of Zimbabwe

- Constituency for the National Assembly of Zimbabwe
- Province: Matabeleland South
- Region: Beitbridge District

Current constituency
- Seats: 1
- Party: ZANU–PF
- Member: Thusani Ndou

Beitbridge West is a constituency represented in the National Assembly of the Parliament of Zimbabwe, located in Beitbridge District in Matabeleland South Province. It is currently represented since a December 2023 by-election by Thusani Ndou of ZANU–PF.

== History ==
Beitbridge West was represented by Metrine Mudau of ZANU–PF between 2008 and 2018. In the 2018 election, Ruth Mavhungu Maboyi of ZANU–PF was elected to the seat.

Morgan Ncube was elected MP for Beitbridge West in the August 2023 general election by 96 votes, becoming the first opposition candidate to win a parliamentary seat in Beitbridge since 2000.

On 3 October 2023, Sengezo Tshabangu, who claimed to be the interim Secretary-General of the CCC, wrote a letter to National Assembly Speaker Jacob Mudenda, in which he stated that Ncube and a group of CCC MPs had been expelled from the party. Mudenda recognized Tshabangu's letter and wrote to the Zimbabwe Electoral Commission that Ncube and other CCC MPs had lost their parliamentary membership, despite party leader Nelson Chamisa asking Mudenda to disregard the letter. Ncube and the other expelled CCC MPs subsequently all filed to stand as CCC candidates in their constituencies for the upcoming by-elections. On 7 December 2023, two days before the scheduled by-elections, the Harare High Court barred Ncube and the other expelled CCC MPs from contesting the by-elections. In the by-election held on 9 December 2023, Thusani Ndou of ZANU–PF was elected to represent the constituency with 88.8% of the vote.

== Members ==
Election	Name	Party
2008	Metrine Mudau	ZANU–PF
2013	Metrine Mudau	ZANU–PF
2018	Ruth Mavhungu Maboyi	ZANU–PF
2023	Morgan Ncube	CCC
2023 by-election	Thusani Ndou	ZANU–PF

== Election results ==
=== 2023 by-election ===
Candidate	Party	Votes	%	+/–
Thusani Ndou	ZANU-PF	4,929	88.81	+42.62
Blessing Brendan Dube	Independent	366	6.59	New
Thoriso Moyo	ZAPU	255	4.59	New
~~Morgan Ncube~~	~~CCC~~	0	0.00	Barred
~~Blessing Choeni~~	~~CCC~~	0	0.00	Withdrew
Total		5,550	100.00	–
Valid votes		5,550	94.76	
Invalid/blank votes		307	5.24	
Total votes		5,857	100.00	
Majority		4,563	82.22	+81.62
ZANU-PF gain from CCC				

== See also ==
- List of Zimbabwean parliamentary constituencies
