= Bright Vanya Moyo =

Zimbabwean politician

Member of the National Assembly of Zimbabwe for Lupane East
- In office 7 September 2023 – 3 October 2023
- Preceded by: New constituency
- Succeeded by: Phathisiwe Machangu

Personal details
- Party: Citizens Coalition for Change

Bright Vanya Moyo is a Zimbabwean politician who served as the Member of Parliament for Lupane East between September and October 2023 as a member of the Citizens Coalition for Change.

In early-October 2023, Moyo was one of fifteen CCC MPs who were recalled by self-proclaimed CCC secretary-general Sengezo Tshabangu. He then registered to contest the by-election in his constituency in December 2023. He was later barred from contesting the by-election by the Harare High Court which saw Phathisiwe Machangu of the ZANU–PF win the seat.
