= Obert Manduna =

Zimbabwean politician

Member of the National Assembly of Zimbabwe for Nketa
- In office 7 September 2023 – 3 October 2023
- Preceded by: Phelela Masuku
- Succeeded by: Albert Tawanda Mavunga

Personal details
- Party: Citizens Coalition for Change

Obert Manduna is a Zimbabwean politician who served as the Member of Parliament for Nketa between September and October 2023 as a member of the Citizens Coalition for Change.

In-early October 2023, Manduna alongside 14 other CCC Members of Parliament ceased being parliamentarians following a letter to Speaker Jacob Mudenda by self-proclaimed CCC Secretary-General Sengezo Tshabangu, in which he purported that they had been expelled from the party. Manduna registered to contest the subsequent by-election in his constituency but was banned by the Harare High Court.
