= Linnet Mazingaidzo =

Zimbabwean politician

Linnet Mazingaidzo is a Zimbabwean politician from Citizens Coalition for Change. She is a women's quota representative for Harare Province.

== See also ==
- List of members of the 10th Parliament of Zimbabwe
