= Munyaradzi Kufahakutizwi =

Zimbabwean politician

Member of the National Assembly of Zimbabwe for Mabvuku-Tafara
- In office 7 September 2023 – 3 October 2023
- Preceded by: James Chidhakwa
- Succeeded by: Pedzai Sakupwanya

Personal details
- Party: Citizens Coalition for Change (2022–present)
- Other political affiliations: MDC Alliance (Until 2020)

Munyaradzi Febion Kufahakutizwi is a Zimbabwean politician who served as the Member of the National Assembly of Zimbabwe for Mabvuku-Tafara between September and October 2023 as a member of the Citizens Coalition for Change.

== Political career ==
Kufahakutizwi was elected the councillor for ward 19 of the Harare City Council as a member of the MDC Alliance during the 2018 harmonised elections. In October 2020, he was expelled from the MDC and ceased to be councillor. He then joined the newly formed Citizens Coalition for Change party led by former MDC Alliance leader Nelson Chamisa and stood as the party's candidate in the by-election in ward 19 in March 2022 and won the seat back.

Kufahakutizwi was elected Member of Parliament for the seat of Mabvuku-Tafara in the 2023 harmonised elections held in August 2023, having narrowly defeated ZANU–PF's Pedzai Sakupwanya.

In October 2023, Sengezo Tshabangu wrote a letter to the Speaker of the National Assembly Jacob Mudenda, in which he claimed to be the Secretary-General of the CCC and stated that Kufahakutizwi and other CCC MPs had been expelled from the party. Despite Chamisa telling Mudenda to disregard Tshabangu's letter, Mudenda went ahead and declared the seats vacant, resulting in by-elections in Mabvuku-Tafara and the other constituencies for 9 December 2023. Kufahakutizwi registered to run in the by-election as a member of the CCC, but was barred from running in the by-election by a High Court order on 7 December, which saw Pedzai Sakupwanya win the seat unopposed.
