= Nkulumane (constituency) =

Constituency of the Parliament of Zimbabwe

- National Assembly constituency for the Parliament of Zimbabwe
- District: Bulawayo
- Province: Bulawayo
- Electorate: 22,833 (2025)
- Major settlements: Nkulumane

Current constituency
- Number of members: 1
- Party: ZANU-PF
- Member: Freedom Phineas Murechu

Nkulumane is a constituency of the National Assembly of the Parliament of Zimbabwe located in the city of Bulawayo in eastern Zimbabwe.

== Elections ==
In the 2023 Zimbabwean general election, Desire Moyo was elected from the Citizens Coalition for Change. Moyo was killed in car crash on 10 October 2025, rendering the seat vacant. The seat was won by ZANU-PF candidate Freedom Phineas Murechu in the following by-election on 20 December 2025.

2025 by-election: Nkulumane
Candidate	Party	Votes	%
Freedom Phineas Murechu	ZANU–PF	3,416	66.42
Rodney Donovan Jele	Independent	745	14.49
Auxilia Zitha	Independent	325	6.32
Mothusi Madlela Ndlovu	CCC	320	6.22
Fuzwayo Mbuso	Independent	121	2.35
Vivian Viyo Siziba	ZAPU	110	2.14
Alson Moyo	EFF Zimbabwe	65	1.26
Ethel Sibanda	MDC-T	23	0.45
Nompilo Malaba Ncube	ZANC	18	0.35
Total		5,143	100.00
Valid votes		5,143	99.30
Invalid/blank votes		36	0.70
Total votes		5,179	100.00
Registered voters/turnout		22,833	22.68
Majority		2,671	
ZANU-PF gain from CCC			

2023 general election: Nkulumane
Candidate	Party	Votes	%
Desire Moyo	CCC	9,880	74.98
Freedom Phineas Murechu	ZANU–PF	2,402	18.23
Andrew Ndlovu	ZAPU	465	3.53
Nompilo Zidyabhebhe	ZANC	177	1.34
Florida Deliah Mtetwa	UZA	151	1.15
Adelaide Mhlanga	FreeZimCongress	101	0.77
Total		13,176	100.00
Registered voters/turnout		22,682	–
Majority		7,478	
CCC hold			

2022 by-election: Nkulumane
Candidate	Party	Votes	%	+/–
Kucaca Ivumile Phulu	CCC	2,760	56.64	New
David Ndlovu	ZANU–PF	1,900	38.99	+15.62
Gideon Mangena	MDC Alliance	150	3.08	−37.56
Lovejoy Gregory Ncube	Republican Party of Zimbabwe	45	0.92	−0.58
Dumisani Tokwido	Democratic Opposition Party	18	0.37	New
Total		4,873	100.00	–
Majority		860	17.65	+0.38%
CCC gain from MDC Alliance				

== See also ==
- List of parliamentary constituencies of Zimbabwe
