= Shepherd Gundu Chengeta =

Zimbabwean politician (1966–2023)

Shepherd Gundu Chengeta, known as Chief Makumbe, (6 February 1966 – 31 October 2023) was a Zimbabwean politician who was a tribal member of the Senate of Zimbabwe. He died on 31 October 2023, at the age of 57.

== See also ==
- List of members of the 10th Parliament of Zimbabwe
