= Felix Mafa Sibanda =

Felix Mafa Sibanda MP

Member of the Seventh Zimbabwean Parliament for Magwegwe
- Incumbent
- Assumed office September 2008
- Preceded by: Fletcher Dulini-Ncube
- Majority: 732 (24.6%)

Personal details
- Born: Felix Magalela Mafa Sibanda; 5 February 1951 (age 75) Montrose Block, Fort Rixon, Insiza, Matebeleland South
- Party: Movement for Democratic Change - Tsvangirai
- Spouse: IDA
- Parent: Mafa Ilifa Maphahla Sibanda (father)

Felix Magalela Mafa Sibanda born 5 February 1951 is a Zimbabwean activist, community organizer, politician and member of parliament for Magwegwe in Bulawayo for the MDC-T party, as well as being national vice spokesperson for that party. He is from the Ndebele Royal inner circle, his great-great-grandfather, Masonginyoka arrived from Transvaal with Mzilikazi as a personal doctor to the King. Tshokomela, his father's father was also King Lobengula's doctor who gave rise to his father Maphahla, also nicknamed Mafa Sigodo meaning the "heir" hence the name Mafa or Ilifa.

In 1980 he was the Zimbabwe African People's Union (ZAPU) candidate for Mashonaland Central constituency in Harare.

In 1985, he stood for ZAPU as a Glen View Candidate. This was done at the request of Joshua Nkomo himself. In 1999, his Glen View house was set on fire by the Zimbabwe African National Union – Patriotic Front thugs and he was chased away from Harare and sent packing to Bulawayo. His crime was for being Ndebele. In 1987. his eldest son Canan Mafa, a former Zimbabwe People's Revolutionary Army (ZIPRA) guerrilla, was abducted by ZANU PF Fifth Brigrade and drowned in the Zambezi river. He became the most outspoken person against Gukurahundi and eventually founded Post Independence Survivors' Trust, a pressure group to find justice against Gukurahundi perpetrators and healing for the victims.

As a trade unionist in 1981, Felix Mafa was the first person recorded in Zimbabwe's history to be responsible for nationwide civil servants strike for better wages and work conditions, including fighting for pensions, and medical services. In subsequent year, Felix continued to press the government for better conditions in civil government. He was the president of the Zimbabwe Teachers Union (ZITU) for many years. The Minister of Labour said that the strike was illegal, and on 22 August, the general secretary, John Makoni, and deputy general secretary, Charles Chiiru, of the Public Service Association (PSA) were arrested. They were released the next day.

The strike was called off on 22 August, but thousands of workers stayed out. On 23 August, the government said that strikers were sacked. This was estimated to affect 70–80% of 180,000 civil servants. Armed riot police were deployed in the capital, Harare, on 27 August to keep watch over sacked workers who gathered in the central park.

The PSA was prevented from giving its viewpoint in the state-owned press. There were threats of arrests, intimidation and victimisation of strikers.

On 3 September, the government agreed to reinstate sacked workers who went back to work. However, managers were told to identify everyone who had gone on strike. Over 30,000 workers were identified and not paid for the two and half weeks of the strike. The government began to abolish jobs.

Nurses and junior doctors resumed the strike on 21 October because they had not got the increase promised by the government. On 28 October, doctors and senior nurses went back to work.

On 4 November, Dr. Farai Jiah was arrested and charged with inciting the strike. Dr. Austin Bene was arrested on 5 November. Both were sacked. Doctors went on strike again.

On 8 November, Felix Mafa, the ZITU president was arrested and sacked, though the charges were later dropped. Many nurses were fired and given one month to appeal.

The government started to advertise health service vacancies in South Africa and the UK.

On 11 November, the Zimbabwe Congress of Trade Unions (ZCTU) and other sections of society held a demonstration in Harare in support of the strikers. The authorities refused to provide a police escort. Morgan Tsvangirai, the ZCTU general secretary, and Isaac Matongo, the ZCTU vice-president, were arrested for two hours and the crowd was tear-gassed before the march started. Riot police used tear gas and batons to disperse demonstrators. The government invoked the colonial Law and Order (Maintenance Act) against the strikers.

On 12 November, the ZCTU called a two-day national strike calling for the reinstatement of the sacked workers.

On 18 November, the Supreme Court referred the cases of the five arrested doctors and nurses for inciting workers to strike. The Harare Magistrates Court noted that the law might be unconstitutional thus violating the right of the accused.

On 26 November, after an appeal to President Mugabe, half the nurses and a third of the junior doctors had been reinstated. Union leaders were excluded. Nurses refused to go back until their leaders were reinstated. They said they would continue to press for a legal mechanism for collective bargaining and dispute resolution.

By 18 December, the two doctors were still not reinstated. The authorities also refused to reinstate five nurses, and three hundred nurses walked out again. The government said they would not be reinstated and tried to stop them getting jobs in local health institutions. Nurses who went back to work reported victimisation.

Prior to his involvement in MDC party politics, he was a civil society activist in the National Constitutional Assembly, serving as Southern Region Organising Secretary and Advocacy chairman. He also serves as director of the Post Independence Survivors' Trust (PIST), from its formation in 2004 until 2008. In the 1990s, Mafa was a teachers' trade unionist, for the Zimbabwe Teachers' Union. He has spoken out strongly against the Gukurahundi and Operation Murambatsvina.

== See also ==
- 1980 Southern Rhodesian general election#Mashonaland East Province
- 1985 Zimbabwean parliamentary election
