= Pelandaba–Mpopoma =

Constituency of the Parliament of Zimbabwe

- Former constituency for the National Assembly of Zimbabwe
- Province: Bulawayo
- Region: Bulawayo
- Major settlements: Imiyela, Mabutweni, Matshobana, Mpopoma, Mpopoma South, Pelandaba

Former constituency
- Created: 2005
- Abolished: 2023
- Seats: 1
- Created from: Mpopoma, Pelandaba
- Replaced by: Mpopoma–Mzilikazi, Pelandaba–Tshabalala

Pelandaba–Mpopoma was a constituency represented in the National Assembly of the Parliament of Zimbabwe. Located in the city of Bulawayo in eastern Zimbabwe, it comprised the high-density suburbs of Imiyela, Mabutweni, Matshobana, Mpopoma, Mpopoma South, and Pelandaba. Its most recent MP following the 2018 election was Charles Moyo of the Movement for Democratic Change Alliance.

== Profile ==
Pelandaba–Mpopoma comprised the high-density suburbs of Imiyela, Mabutweni, Matshobana, Mpopoma, Mpopoma South, and Pelandaba in the city/metropolitan province of Bulawayo. The constituency was marked by high levels of poverty and unemployment, with most constituents participating in black-market and informal work rather than working in the formal economy. Many constituents also depended on cross-border trading with Zimbabwe's neighboring countries. As of 2015, the constituency contained seven primary schools, three secondary schools, and two health centres.

== History ==
In the 2005 election, the constituency was won by Milton Gwetu of the Movement for Democratic Change. In the 2008 and 2013 elections, constituency elected MDC–T candidates Samuel Khumalo and Bekithemba Nyathi, respectively. On 4 March 2015, MDC–T leadership recalled Nyathi from parliament after the legislator joined a splinter group called the United MDC. Per Section 129 (1) (k) of the Constitution of Zimbabwe, a member of parliament is automatically recalled if that member ceases to belong to the political party on whose ticket he or she was elected. In a by-election held on 10 June 2015, Joseph Chuma of ZANU–PF was elected to replace Nyathi. In the 2018 election, Charles Moyo of the Movement for Democratic Change Alliance was elected for Pelandaba–Mpopoma, winning the constituency back for the opposition.

== Members ==
Election	Name	Party	Ref.
2005	Milton Gwetu	MDC	
2008	Samuel Khumalo	MDC–T	
2013	Bekithemba Nyathi	MDC–T	
2015 by-election	Joseph Chuma	ZANU–PF	
2018	Charles Moyo	MDC Alliance	

== See also ==
- List of Zimbabwean parliamentary constituencies
