= Desmond Makaza =

Zimbabwean politician

Member of the National Assembly of Zimbabwe for Mpopoma–Mzilikazi
- In office 7 September 2023 – 3 October 2023
- Preceded by: New constituency
- Succeeded by: Charles Moyo

Personal details
- Party: Citizens Coalition for Change

Desmond Makaza is a Zimbabwean politician affiliated with the Citizens Coalition for Change, and he was the Member of the National Assembly of Zimbabwe for Mpopoma–Mzilikazi during September–October 2023.

Makaza was among fifteen CCC MPs recalled from parliament in October 2023 after self-proclaimed Secretary-General Sengezo Tshabangu alleged their expulsion, a move challenged by party president Nelson Chamisa. Makaza subsequently filed nomination papers to contest the by-election in his constituency on 9 December, but was disqualified from contesting by the Harare High Court.
