= Morgan Ncube =

Zimbabwean politician

Member of the National Assembly of Zimbabwe for Beitbridge West
- In office 7 September 2023 – 3 October 2023
- Preceded by: Ruth Mavhungu-Maboyi
- Succeeded by: Thusani Ndou

Mayor of Beitbridge
- In office 10 September 2018 – September 2020
- Preceded by: Showa Moyo (acting)
- Succeeded by: Munyaradzi Chitsunge

Personal details
- Party: Citizens Coalition for Change (2022–present)
- Other political affiliations: MDC Alliance (2018–2020)

Morgan Ncube is a Zimbabwean politician who served as the Member of Parliament for Beitbridge West as a member of the Citizens Coalition for Change between September and October 2023. He formerly served as the mayor of Beitbridge in Matabeleland South from 2018 to 2020 as a member of the MDC Alliance.

== Political career ==
Ncube was a member of the MDC Alliance and served as the party's national youth organising secretary. He was elected the councillor for Ward 4 of the Beitbridge Town Council during the 2018 harmonised elections. Shortly afterwards, he was elected unopposed as town mayor.

In September 2020, Ncube was expelled from the MDC Alliance by Movement for Democratic Change – Tsvangirai leader Thokozani Khupe for supporting former MDC Alliance leader Nelson Chamisa. He ceased to be a councillor and mayor as a result. Ncube then became a member of Chamisa's new political party, the Citizens Coalition for Change, after its founding in January 2022 and won his council seat back in a by-election in March 2022 as a member of the party.

Ncube was elected Member of Parliament for Beitbridge West in the general election held on 23 August 2023 by 96 votes, becoming the first opposition candidate to win a parliamentary seat in Beitbridge since 2000.

On 3 October 2023, Sengenzo Tshabangu, who claimed to be the interim Secretary-General of the CCC, wrote a letter to National Assembly Speaker Jacob Mudenda, in which he stated that Ncube and a group of CCC MPs had been expelled from the party. Mudenda recognized Tshabangu's letter and wrote to the Zimbabwean electoral commission that Ncube and other CCC MPs had lost their parliamentary membership, despite party leader Chamisa asking Mudenda to disregard the letter. Ncube and the other expelled CCC MPs subsequently all filed to stand as CCC candidates in their constituencies for the by-elections on 9 December 2023. On 7 December 2023, two days before the scheduled by-elections, the Harare High Court barred Ncube and the other expelled CCC MPs from contesting the by-elections.
