= Murewa South =

Murehwa South
- Constituency for the National Assembly of Zimbabwe
- Province: Mashonaland East
- Region: Murehwa District

Current constituency
- Number of members: 1
- Party: ZANU–PF
- Member: Noah Mangondo

Murehwa South, also spelled Murewa South, is a constituency represented in the National Assembly of the Parliament of Zimbabwe, located in Murehwa District in Mashonaland East Province. Its current MP since the 2023 election is Noah Mangondo of ZANU–PF. Previously, the constituency was represented by Nyasha Masoka following a 26 March 2022 by-election to replace Joel Biggie Matiza, who died on 22 January 2021 (both of ZANU–PF).

== Election results ==
2022 by-election: Murehwa South
Candidate	Party	Votes	%	+/–
Nyasha Masoka	ZANU–PF	11,125	83.92	+38.01
Rodreck Munemo	CCC	1,729	13.04	New
Dagmore Maruza	MDC Alliance	309	2.33	-5.41
Simba Nesara	United Democratic Alliance	94	0.71	New
Total		13,257	100.00	–
Majority		9,396	70.88	+70.22
ZANU–PF hold				

== See also ==
- List of Zimbabwean parliamentary constituencies
