= Gertrude Chibagu =

Zimbabwean politician

Gertrude Chibagu is a Zimbabwean politician from ZANU–PF. She is a women's quota representative for Mashonaland Central Province.

== See also ==
- List of members of the 10th Parliament of Zimbabwe
