= Lobengula–Magwegwe =

Constituency of the Parliament of Zimbabwe

- National Assembly constituency for the Parliament of Zimbabwe
- District: Bulawayo
- Province: Bulawayo
- Electorate: 25,615 (2023)
- Major settlements: Lobengula, Magwegwe

Current constituency
- Created: 2023
- Number of members: 1
- Party: Citizens Coalition for Change
- Member: Tendayi Chitura Nyathi
- Created from: Lobengula and Magwegwe

Lobengula–Magwegwe is a constituency of the National Assembly of the Parliament of Zimbabwe located in the city of Bulawayo in eastern Zimbabwe.

== History ==
The constituency was created in 2023 out of the Lobengula and Magwegwe constituencies.

== Elections ==
In the 2023 Zimbabwean general election, Ereck Gono was elected from the Citizens Coalition for Change. He was replaced by Tendayi Chitura Nyathi following the 2023–2024 Zimbabwean by-elections.

== See also ==
- List of parliamentary constituencies of Zimbabwe
