= Mabvuku–Tafara =

Zimbabwean constituency

- National Assembly constituency for the Parliament of Zimbabwe
- District: Harare
- Province: Harare
- Electorate: 38,002 (2023)

Current constituency
- Number of members: 1
- Party: ZANU–PF
- Member: Pedzai Sakupwanya

Mabvuku–Tafara is a constituency represented in the National Assembly of the Parliament of Zimbabwe.

== Members ==
| Election | Name | Party |
|---|---|---|
| 2023 | Munyaradzi Febion Kufahakutizwi | Citizens Coalition for Change |
| 2023 by-election | Pedzai Sakupwanya | ZANU–PF |

== See also ==
- List of Zimbabwean parliamentary constituencies
