= 2022 Zimbabwean by-elections =

2022 by-elections in Zimbabwe

2022 Zimbabwean parliamentary by-election
- 26 March 2022

28 of the 270 seats in the House of Assembly
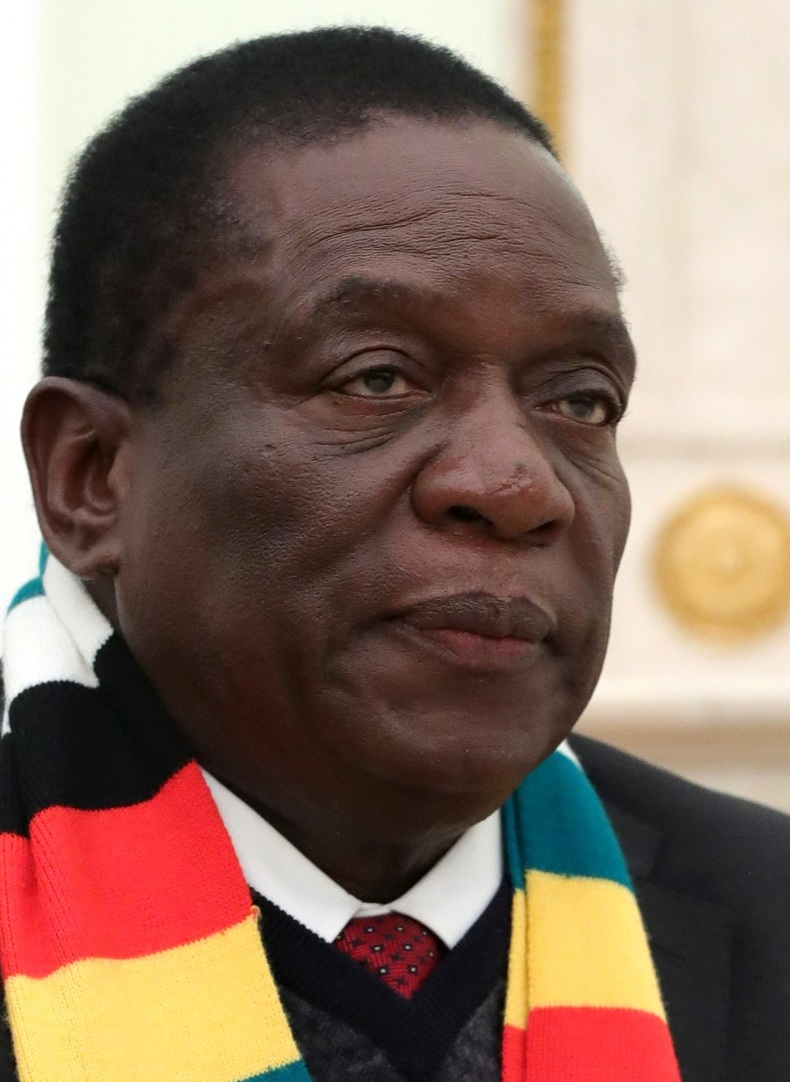

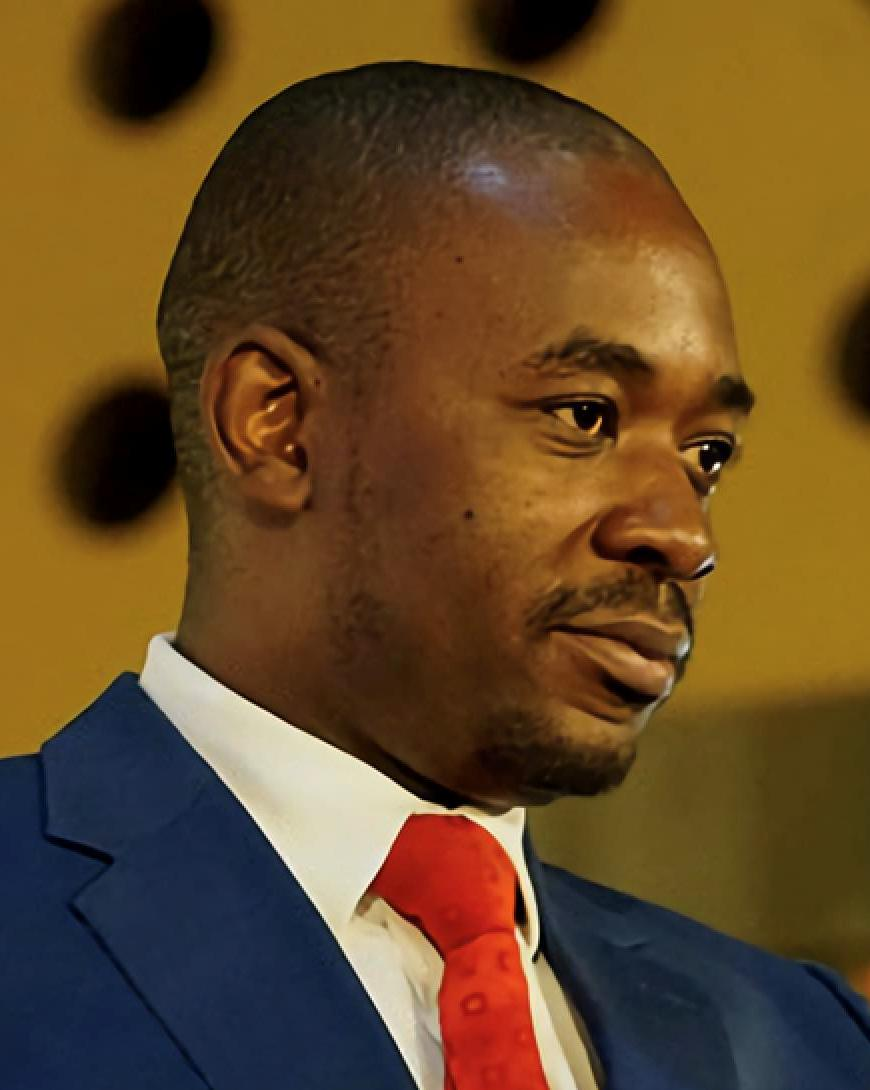
	Majority party	Minority party	Third party
Leader	Emmerson Mnangagwa	Nelson Chamisa	Douglas Mwonzora
Party	ZANU–PF	CCC	MDC Alliance
Last election	179 seats, 52.35%	New Party	88 seats, 34.72%
Seats after	181	19	68
Seat change	▲2	▲19	▼20
	Fourth party
Leader	Ambrose Mutinhiri
Party	National Patriotic Front
Last election	1 seat, 1.04%
Seats after	0
Seat change	▼1
- Results of the elections: ZANU-PF win CCC win No election

- Composition of the National Assembly after the election

The 2022 Zimbabwean by-elections were held on 26 March 2022, to fill in vacancies in the Parliament of Zimbabwe and in local government.

The Citizens Coalition for Change (CCC) won 19 out of the 28 national assembly seats in the constituencies. The elections were regarded as a bad sign for the ruling ZANU–PF for the general election the following year, but the CCC failed to win the presidency or the parliament.

== Results ==
Constituency	Province	Reason for vacancy	Results
Nkulumane	Bulawayo	Recall of Kucaca Ivumile Phulu	Candidate / Party / Votes / % / +/–; Kucaca Ivumile Phulu / CCC / 2,760 / 56.64 / New; David Ndlovu / ZANU–PF / 1,900 / 38.99 / +15.62; Gideon Mangena / MDC Alliance / 150 / 3.08 / −37.56; Lovejoy Gregory Ncube / Republican Party of Zimbabwe / 45 / 0.92 / −0.58; Dumisani Tokwido / Democratic Opposition Party / 18 / 0.37 / New; Total / / 4,873 / 100.00 / –; Majority / / 860 / 17.65 / +0.38%; CCC gain from MDC Alliance
Pumula	Bulawayo	Recall of Sichelesile Mahlangu	Candidate / Party / Votes / % / +/–; Sichelesile Mahlangu / CCC / 3,092 / 64.92 / New; Pumulani Nsingo / ZANU–PF / 1,212 / 25.45 / +2.64; Richard Ncube / ZAPU / 227 / 4.77 / +0.30; Albert Mhlanga / MDC Alliance / 110 / 2.31 / -43.02; Thabani Tshuma / Independent / 62 / 1.30 / New; Ntandoyenkosi Ndlovu / United Democratic Alliance / 33 / 0.69 / +0.15; Stanford Nyoni / Republican Party of Zimbabwe / 27 / 0.57 / -0.03; Total / / 4,763 / 100.00 / –; Majority / / 1,880 / 39.47 / +16.95; CCC gain from MDC Alliance
Epworth	Harare	Recall of Earthrage Kureva	Candidate / Party / Votes / % / +/–; Zalerah Hazvineyi Makari / ZANU–PF / 10,246 / 51.73 / +23.56; Earthrage Kureva / CCC / 8,283 / 41.82 / New; Togarepi Zivai Mhetu / MDC Alliance / 745 / 3.76 / -41.73; Innocent Hazvina / Independent / 441 / 2.23 / New; Richard Musiyadzanikwa / Labour, Economists and African Democrats / 92 / 0.46 / New; Total / / 19,807 / 100.00 / –; Majority / / 1,963 / 9.91 / -7.41; ZANU–PF gain from MDC Alliance
Glen Norah	Harare	Recall of Wellington Chikombo	Candidate / Party / Votes / % / +/–; Wellington Chikombo / CCC / 5,098 / 72.45 / New; Chrispen Allen Magaya / ZANU–PF / 1,552 / 22.05 / +2.60; Israel Mabhande / MDC Alliance / 280 / 3.98 / -68.49; Kuda Garwe / New Patriotic Front / 58 / 0.82 / New; Allen Munyuki / United Democratic Alliance / 49 / 0.70 / -0.18; Total / / 7,037 / 100.00 / –; Valid votes / / 7,037 / 99.28 / +0.31; Invalid/blank votes / / 51 / 0.72 / -0.31; Total votes / / 7,088 / 100.00 / –; Registered voters/turnout / / 23,865 / 29.70 / -57.17; Majority / / 3,546 / 50.39 / -2.63; CCC gain from MDC Alliance
Glen View North	Harare	Death of Kennedy Dinar	Candidate / Party / Votes / % / +/–; Fani Munengami / CCC / 4,053 / 70.33 / New; Martin Mambo / ZANU–PF / 1,578 / 27.38 / +8.43; Rhino Mashaya / MDC Alliance / 112 / 1.94 / -65.48; Prudence Tatenda Munyandari / New Patriotic Front / 20 / 0.35 / New; Total / / 5,763 / 100.00 / –; Valid votes / / 5,763 / 99.04 / 0; Invalid/blank votes / / 56 / 0.96 / 0; Total votes / / 5,819 / 100.00 / –; Registered voters/turnout / / 17,740 / 32.80 / -54.84; Majority / / 2,475 / 42.95 / -5.53; CCC gain from MDC Alliance
Harare Central	Harare	Recall of Murisi Zwizwai	Candidate / Party / Votes / % / +/–; Murisi Zwizwai / CCC / 3,332 / 69.49 / New; Loice Magweba / ZANU–PF / 1,375 / 28.68 / -0.18; Marara Norest Chiureki / MDC Alliance / 65 / 1.36 / -54.37; Linda Masarira / Labour, Economists and African Democrats / 20 / 0.42 / New; Rukanda Henry Gwinyai / MA'AT Zimbabwe / 3 / 0.06 / New; Total / / 4,795 / 100.00 / –; Majority / / 1,957 / 40.81 / +13.94; CCC gain from MDC Alliance
Harare East	Harare	Recall of Tendai Biti	Candidate / Party / Votes / % / +/–; Tendai Biti / CCC / 7,534 / 69.79 / New; Mavis Gumbo / ZANU–PF / 3,045 / 28.20 / +1.74; Christopher Mbanga / MDC Alliance / 114 / 1.06 / -62.38; Garikai Mlambo / United Zimbabwe Alliance / 100 / 0.93 / New; Rukanda Henry Gwinyai / Labour, Economists and African Democrats / 3 / 0.03 / New; Total / / 10,796 / 100.00 / –; Valid votes / / 10,796 / 99.16 / +0.21; Invalid/blank votes / / 92 / 0.84 / -0.21; Total votes / / 10,888 / 100.00 / –; Majority / / 4,489 / 41.58 / +4.61; CCC gain from MDC Alliance
Highfield East	Harare	Recall of Erick Murai	Candidate / Party / Votes / % / +/–; Erick Murai / CCC / 5,610 / 72.60 / New; Nobert Chikumbo / ZANU–PF / 1,600 / 20.71 / +3.02; Gilbert Bgwende / MDC Alliance / 483 / 6.25 / -57.15; Shelton Mupambwa / Patriotic Zimbabweans / 34 / 0.44 / New; Total / / 7,727 / 100.00 / –; Valid votes / / 7,727 / 99.22 / +0.35; Invalid/blank votes / / 61 / 0.78 / -0.35; Total votes / / 7,788 / 100.00 / –; Registered voters/turnout / / 10,816 / 72.00 / -5.88; Majority / / 4,010 / 51.9 / +6.19; CCC gain from MDC Alliance
Highfield West	Harare	Recall of Happymore Chidziva	Candidate / Party / Votes / % / +/–; Happymore Chidziva / CCC / 4,592 / 73.77 / New; Emmanuel Juta / ZANU–PF / 1,474 / 23.68 / +2.56; Ruwuke Simon Hove / MDC Alliance / 159 / 2.55 / -67.48; Total / / 6,225 / 100.00 / –; Valid votes / / 6,225 / 98.86 / +0.03; Invalid/blank votes / / 72 / 1.14 / -0.03; Total votes / / 6,297 / 100.00 / –; Registered voters/turnout / / 18,909 / 33.30 / -53.1; Majority / / 3,118 / 49.52 / +0.61; CCC gain from MDC Alliance
Kambuzuma	Harare	Recall of Willias Madzimure	Candidate / Party / Votes / % / +/–; Willias Madzimure / CCC / 3,092 / 68.21 / New; Oscar Nyamunokora / ZANU–PF / 1,333 / 29.41 / +5.88; Fungai Chiposi / MDC Alliance / 108 / 2.38 / -56.57; Total / / 4,533 / 100.00 / –; Majority / / 1,759 / 38.8 / +3.39; CCC gain from MDC Alliance
Kuwadzana	Harare	Death of Miriam Mushayi	Candidate / Party / Votes / % / +/–; Johnson Matambo / CCC / 7,157 / 70.81 / New; Betty Nhambu / ZANU–PF / 2,636 / 26.08 / -3.70; Fatima Madamombe / MDC Alliance / 259 / 2.56 / -58.91; Nesbert Mapfumo / United Democratic Alliance / 56 / 0.55 / New; Total / / 10,108 / 100.00 / –; Valid votes / / 10,108 / 100.00 / +0.86; Invalid/blank votes / / 0 / 0.00 / -0.86; Total votes / / 10,108 / 100.00 / –; Registered voters/turnout / / 52,454 / 19.27 / -65.38; Majority / / 4,521 / 44.73 / +13.04; CCC gain from MDC Alliance
Kuwadzana East	Harare	Recall of Chalton Hwende	Candidate / Party / Votes / % / +/–; Chalton Hwende / CCC / 5,238 / 76.36 / New; Ernest Kudzaishe Chagadama / ZANU–PF / 1,311 / 19.11 / +0.79; Urayayi Mangwiro / MDC Alliance / 146 / 2.13 / -70.87; Chamunorwa David Kachidza / United Zimbabwe Alliance / 98 / 1.43 / New; Jedediah K.S. Chigariro / United Democratic Alliance / 39 / 0.57 / +0.49; Selentino Majiri / Patriotic Zimbabweans / 28 / 0.41 / New; Total / / 6,860 / 100.00 / –; Valid votes / / 6,860 / 100.00 / +0.92; Invalid/blank votes / / 0 / 0.00 / -0.92; Total votes / / 6,860 / 100.00 / –; Registered voters/turnout / / 23,160 / 29.62 / -56.14; Majority / / 3,927 / 57.24 / +2.56; CCC gain from MDC Alliance
Mufakose	Harare	Recall of Susan Matsunga	Candidate / Party / Votes / % / +/–; Susan Matsunga / CCC / 4,039 / 75.00 / New; Melvin Taurai Marembo / ZANU–PF / 1,128 / 20.95 / +5.32; Rodwell Shambamuto / MDC Alliance / 218 / 4.05 / -54.522; Total / / 5,385 / 100.00 / –; Valid votes / / 5,385 / 98.61 / +0.05; Invalid/blank votes / / 76 / 1.39 / -0.05; Total votes / / 5,461 / 100.00 / –; Registered voters/turnout / / 17,730 / 30.80 / -56.23; Majority / / 2,911 / 54.06 / +11.12; CCC gain from MDC Alliance
St Mary's	Harare	Recall of Unganai Tarusenga	Candidate / Party / Votes / % / +/–; Unganai Dickson Tarusenga / CCC / 5,830 / 55.16 / New; Norbet Jinjika / ZANU–PF / 4,483 / 42.42 / +12.90; Adam Puzo / MDC Alliance / 201 / 1.90 / -38.67; Marcos Sanyanga / Independent / 55 / 0.52 / New; Total / / 10,569 / 100.00 / –; Valid votes / / 10,569 / 99.18 / +0.37; Invalid/blank votes / / 87 / 0.82 / -0.37; Total votes / / 10,656 / 100.00 / –; Registered voters/turnout / / 28,878 / 36.90 / -49.64; Majority / / 1,347 / 12.74 / +1.69; CCC gain from MDC Alliance
Dangamvura–Chikanga	Manicaland	Recall of Prosper Mutseyami	Candidate / Party / Votes / % / +/–; Prosper Chapfiwa Mutseyami / CCC / 13,132 / 65.50 / New; Isau Mupfumi / ZANU–PF / 6,304 / 31.44 / +11.52; Taurai Mudzipurwa / MDC Alliance / 348 / 1.74 / -65.46; Hosia Chipanga / Patriotic Zimbabweans / 209 / 1.04 / New; Anesu Zaranyika / MA'AT Zimbabwe / 57 / 0.28 / New; Total / / 20,050 / 100.00 / –; Majority / / 6,828 / 34.05 / -11.49; CCC gain from MDC Alliance
Mutasa South	Manicaland	Recall of Regai Tsunga	Candidate / Party / Votes / % / +/–; Misheck Mugadza / ZANU–PF / 5,818 / 51.49 / +6.56; Regai Tsunga / CCC / 5,269 / 46.63 / New; Pedzisai Tauzeni / MDC Alliance / 162 / 1.43 / -50.72; Eurydice Lynette Ndoro / Independent / 50 / 0.44 / New; Total / / 11,299 / 100.00 / –; Majority / / 549 / 4.86 / -2.36; ZANU–PF gain from MDC Alliance
Marondera Central	Mashonaland East	Recall of Caston Matewu	Candidate / Party / Votes / % / +/–; Caston Matewu / CCC / 6,756 / 59.77 / New; Ignatious Mateveke / ZANU–PF / 4,200 / 37.16 / +2.89; Witness Muzavazi / MDC Alliance / 292 / 2.58 / -57.10; Tawanda Carlos Pindirire / Independent / 55 / 0.49 / New; Total / / 11,303 / 100.00 / –; Majority / / 2,556 / 22.61 / -2.80; CCC gain from MDC Alliance
Marondera East	Mashonaland East	Death of Patrick Chidakwa	Candidate / Party / Votes / % / +/–; Jeremiah Z Chiwetu / ZANU–PF / 9,379 / 82.01 / +2.70; Samuel Machekanyanga / CCC / 1,874 / 16.39 / New; Thomas Tasarirenhamo / MDC Alliance / 104 / 0.91 / -18.97; Moses Mandaza / Zimbabwe Labour Party / 80 / 0.70 / -0.11; Total / / 11,437 / 100.00 / –; Majority / / 7,505 / 65.62 / +6.19; ZANU–PF hold
Murehwa South	Mashonaland East	Death of Joel Biggie Matiza	Candidate / Party / Votes / % / +/–; Nyasha Masoka / ZANU–PF / 11,125 / 83.92 / +38.01; Rodreck Munemo / CCC / 1,729 / 13.04 / New; Dagmore Maruza / MDC Alliance / 309 / 2.33 / -5.41; Simba Nesara / United Democratic Alliance / 94 / 0.71 / New; Total / / 13,257 / 100.00 / –; Majority / / 9,396 / 70.88 / +70.22; ZANU–PF hold
Chivi South	Masvingo	Recall of Killer Zivhu	Candidate / Party / Votes / % / +/–; Munyaradzi Zizhou / ZANU–PF / 6,832 / 79.10 / +9.39; Paul Thompson Mhlolo / CCC / 1,414 / 16.37 / New; Shadreck Mapope / MDC Alliance / 252 / 2.92 / -14.40; Faith Chuma / Patriotic Zimbabweans / 139 / 1.61 / New; Total / / 8,637 / 100.00 / –; Valid votes / / 8,637 / 97.64 / +0.24; Invalid/blank votes / / 209 / 2.36 / -0.24; Total votes / / 8,846 / 100.00 / –; Majority / / 5,418 / 62.73 / +10.343; ZANU–PF hold
Mwenezi East	Masvingo	Death of Joosbi Omar	Candidate / Party / Votes / % / +/–; Master Makope / ZANU–PF / 12,177 / 87.35 / +3.46; Tendekai Mandizvidza / CCC / 1,573 / 11.28 / New; Turner Mhango / Free Zimbabwe Congress / 191 / 1.37 / +0.21; Total / / 13,941 / 100.00 / –; Valid votes / / 13,941 / 98.11 / +0.13; Invalid/blank votes / / 269 / 1.89 / -0.13; Total votes / / 14,210 / 100.00 / –; Registered voters/turnout / / 32,969 / 43.10 / -40.77; Majority / / 10,604 / 76.06 / +5.25; ZANU–PF hold
Binga North	Matabeleland North	Recall of Prince Dubeko Sibanda	Candidate / Party / Votes / % / +/–; Prince Dubeko Sibanda / CCC / 10,130 / 53.85 / New; Kudakwashe M. Munsaka / ZANU–PF / 7,971 / 42.37 / +14.60; Peggie Mudimba / MDC Alliance / 356 / 1.89 / -64.13; Disciple Mukuli / Independent / 220 / 1.17 / New; Clive Muzamba / United Democratic Alliance / 136 / 0.72 / New; Total / / 18,813 / 100.00 / –; Majority / / 2,159 / 11.48 / -26.77; CCC gain from MDC Alliance
Tsholotsho South	Matabeleland North	Death of Zenzo Sibanda	Candidate / Party / Votes / % / +/–; Musa Ncube / ZANU–PF / 4,759 / 54.95 / +0.92; Tapson Nganunu / CCC / 2,879 / 33.24 / New; Leonard Mthombemi / ZAPU / 868 / 10.02 / +6.85; Bongani Moyo / Independent / 155 / 1.79 / New; Total / / 8,661 / 100.00 / –; Valid votes / / 8,661 / 98.71 / +0.72; Invalid/blank votes / / 113 / 1.29 / -0.72; Total votes / / 8,774 / 100.00 / –; Registered voters/turnout / / 19,562 / 44.85 / -32.68; Majority / / 1,880 / 21.71 / -15.96; ZANU–PF hold
Gokwe Central	Midlands	Recall of Victor Matemadanda	Candidate / Party / Votes / % / +/–; Daveson Masvisvi / ZANU–PF / 8,290 / 60.78 / +18.92; Lisias Mutegwe / CCC / 5,130 / 37.61 / New; Edward Vakai / MDC Alliance / 220 / 1.61 / -32.13; Total / / 13,640 / 100.00 / –; Majority / / 3,160 / 23.17 / +15.06; ZANU–PF hold
Kwekwe Central	Midlands	Death of Masango Matambanadzo (NPF)	Candidate / Party / Votes / % / +/–; Judith Tobaiwa / CCC / 6,639 / 67.52 / New; John Mapurazi / ZANU–PF / 2,883 / 29.32 / +7.02; Lenin Tafadzwa Dzingire / United Zimbabwe Alliance / 165 / 1.68 / New; Mbekezeli Ndlovu / MDC Alliance / 145 / 1.47 / -33.26; Total / / 9,832 / 100.00 / –; Majority / / 3,756 / 32.2 / +29.96; CCC gain from National Patriotic Front
Mberengwa South	Midlands	Death of Alum Mpofu	Candidate / Party / Votes / % / +/–; Tasara Hungwe / ZANU–PF / 7,935 / 84.78 / +5.62; Davies Shoko / CCC / 1,425 / 15.22 / New; Total / / 9,360 / 100.00 / –; Majority / / 6,510 / 69.55 / +5.91; ZANU–PF hold
Mbizo	Midlands	Recall of Settlement Chikwinya	Candidate / Party / Votes / % / +/–; Settlement Chikwinya / CCC / 7,146 / 66.42 / New; Vongaishe Mupereri / ZANU–PF / 3,232 / 30.04 / +4.99; Eventhough-Brave Mapfumo / MDC Alliance / 189 / 1.76 / -60.60; Gladys G. Mutunami / United Zimbabwe Alliance / 103 / 0.96 / New; Lovemore Chibukwe / United Democratic Alliance / 89 / 0.83 / New; Total / / 10,759 / 100.00 / –; Majority / / 3,914 / 36.38 / -0.94; CCC gain from MDC Alliance
Mkoba	Midlands	Recall of Amos Chibaya	Candidate / Party / Votes / % / +/–; Amos Chibaya / CCC / 6,809 / 70.39 / New; William Gondo / ZANU–PF / 2,613 / 27.01 / +5.25; Albert Chadoka / MDC Alliance / 230 / 2.38 / -65.26; Malvern Zihapa / Federation of African States / 21 / 0.22 / New; Total / / 9,673 / 100.00 / –; Majority / / 4,196 / 43.38 / +2.50; CCC gain from MDC Alliance
