= Cowdray Park (constituency) =

Constituency of the Parliament of Zimbabwe

- National Assembly constituency for the Parliament of Zimbabwe
- District: Bulawayo
- Province: Bulawayo
- Electorate: 27,568 (2023)
- Major settlements: Cowdray Park

Current constituency
- Created: 2023
- Number of members: 1
- Party: ZANU–PF
- Member: Arthur Mujeyi
- Created from: Luveve

Cowdray Park is a constituency of the National Assembly of the Parliament of Zimbabwe, located in the Cowdray Park suburb of Bulawayo. Created for the 2023 general election, it is represented since a December 2023 by-election by Arthur Mujeyi of ZANU–PF.

== Profile ==
The suburb had a population of 75,000 people in 2022. Most of the constituency is not electrified and has no working sewer system since the community's founding in the mid-2000s.

== History ==
The constituency was created in 2023. The bulk of the seat came from the neighbouring Luveve constituency.

In the 2023 election, finance minister Mthuli Ncube of ZANU–PF was defeated by Pashor Raphael Sibanda of the Citizens Coalition for Change.

In October 2023, Sibanda and fourteen other CCC MPs ceased being parliamentarians following a letter by Sengenzo Tshabangu, who claimed to the interim secretary-general of the CCC, in which he wrote that Sibanda and the other MPs had been expelled from the party. Sibanda and the other expelled CCC MPs filed to run in the by-elections scheduled for 9 December 2023; however, the Harare High Court barred them from participating.

In the 9 December 2023 by-election, ZANU–PF candidate Arthur Mujeyi defeated CCC candidate Vusumuzi Chirwa with 53% of the vote.

== Election results ==
2023–2024 Zimbabwean by-elections: Cowdray Park
Candidate	Party	Votes	%	+/–
Aurther Mujeyi	ZANU-PF	1,765	53.08	+9.44
Vusumuzi Chirwa	CCC	1,560	46.92	-9.44
~~Pashor Raphael Sibanda~~	~~CCC~~	0	0.00	Barred
Total		3,325	100.00	–
Valid votes		3,325	85.32	
Invalid/blank votes		572	14.68	
Total votes		3,897	100.00	
Registered voters/turnout		27,638	14.10	
Majority		205	6.17	-6.55
ZANU-PF gain from CCC				

2023 Zimbabwean general election: Cowdray Park
Candidate	Party	Votes	%
Pashor Raphael Sibanda	CCC	8,411	56.36
Mthuli Ncube	ZANU-PF	6,513	43.64
Total		14,924	100.00
Majority		1,898	12.7
CCC gain (new constituency)			
Source: ZEC

== See also ==
- List of Zimbabwean parliamentary constituencies
