= Pelandaba–Tshabalala =

Constituency of the Parliament of Zimbabwe

- National Assembly constituency for the Parliament of Zimbabwe
- District: Bulawayo
- Province: Bulawayo
- Electorate: 22,817 (2023)

Current constituency
- Created: 2023
- Number of members: 1
- Party: ZANU-PF
- Member: Joseph Tshuma
- Created from: Pelandaba–Mpopoma

Pelandaba–Tshabalala is a constituency of the National Assembly of the Parliament of Zimbabwe located in the city of Bulawayo in eastern Zimbabwe.

== History ==
The constituency was created for the 2023 Zimbabwean general election, when the constituency was created from Pelandaba–Mpopoma.

== Elections ==
In the 2023 Zimbabwean general election, Gift Siziba was elected from the Citizens Coalition for Change. He was replaced by Joseph Tshuma following the 2023–2024 Zimbabwean by-elections.

== See also ==
- List of parliamentary constituencies of Zimbabwe
