= Mzilikazi, Bulawayo =

Township of Bulawayo, Zimbabwe

Mzilikazi is a high-density suburb or township of Bulawayo, Zimbabwe. It was established in 1945, and was named after the Ndebele king Mzilikazi.

It forms the core of the parliamentary seat of Mpopoma–Mzilikazi.
