= St Mary's (constituency) =

Zimbabwean constituency

- National Assembly constituency for the Parliament of Zimbabwe
- District: Chitungwiza
- Province: Harare
- Electorate: 34,268 (2023)

Current constituency
- Number of members: 1
- Party: Citizens Coalition for Change
- Member: Brighton Mazhindu

St Mary's is a constituency represented in the National Assembly of the Parliament of Zimbabwe. The current MP is Brighton Mazhindu of the Citizens Coalition for Change since the 2018 election.

== Members ==
Election	Name	Party
2018	Brighton Mazhindu	MDC Alliance
2023	Brighton Mazhindu	Citizens Coalition for Change

== See also ==
- List of Zimbabwean parliamentary constituencies
