= Murisi Zwizwai =

Zimbabwean politician (1969/1970 – 2024)

Murisi Zwizwai (1970 – 1 June 2024) was a Zimbabwean politician from Movement for Democratic Change – Tsvangirai who served as Deputy Minister of Mines and Mining Development and later as Deputy Minister of information, publicity and broadcasting services. He was the Member of the National Assembly of Zimbabwe for Harare Central first elected in 2003. He was re-elected in the 2022 by-election. He died in Harare on 1 June 2024, aged 54.
