= Glen Norah (constituency) =

Zimbabwean constituency

- National Assembly constituency for the Parliament of Zimbabwe
- District: Harare
- Province: Harare
- Electorate: 33,763 (2023)
- Major settlements: Glen Norah, Harare

Current constituency
- Number of members: 1
- Party: Citizens Coalition for Change
- Member: Wellington Chikombo

Glen Norah is a constituency represented in the National Assembly of the Parliament of Zimbabwe. The current MP is Wellington Chikombo of the Citizens Coalition for Change since the 2018 election.

== Members ==
Election	Name	Party
2018	Wellington Chikombo	MDC Alliance
2023	Wellington Chikombo	Citizens Coalition for Change

== See also ==
- List of Zimbabwean parliamentary constituencies
