= Magwegwe =

Constituency of the Parliament of Zimbabwe

- Former constituency for the National Assembly of Zimbabwe
- Region: Bulawayo
- Major settlements: Magwegwe

Former constituency
- Abolished: 2023

Magwegwe was a constituency of the National Assembly of the Parliament of Zimbabwe located in the city of Bulawayo in eastern Zimbabwe.

== History ==
The constituency was abolished for the 2023 Zimbabwean general election, and replaced with Lobengula–Magwegwe.

== Members ==
Constituency	Name	Party	Notes
2018	Anele Ndebele	MDC Alliance	

== See also ==
- List of parliamentary constituencies of Zimbabwe
