= Takudzwa Ngadziore =

Zimbabwean politician (born 1998)

Takudzwa Godfrey Ngadziore (born 1998) is a Zimbabwean politician from the Citizens Coalition for Change. In the 2023 Zimbabwean general election he was elected to the National Assembly from the youth quota for Harare Province, becoming the baby of the house.

== Biography ==
In 2020, Ngadziore was imprisoned for protesting as president of the Zimbabwe National Students Union (ZINASU). He was arrested and imprisoned again in 2021, along with two other ZINASU officers, for protesting the detention of another activist and former student leader. In November 2023, Ngadziore was reportedly abducted and tortured. This was just a fortnight before CCC activist Tapfumaneyi Masaya was kidnapped and murdered.
