= Albert Mavunga =

Zimbabwean politician

The Hon. Albert Mavunga MP

Deputy Minister of Local Government and Public Works responsible for Local Authorities and Traditional Leadership
- Incumbent
- Assumed office 13 February 2025
- President: Emmerson Mnangagwa
- Minister: Daniel Garwe
- Preceded by: New role in Ministry

Member of Parliament for Nketa
- Incumbent
- Assumed office 9 December 2023
- President: Emmerson Mnangagwa
- Preceded by: Obert Manduna
- Constituency: Nketa
- Majority: 111 (3.6%)

Personal details
- Party: ZANU-PF

Albert Tawanda Mavunga is a Zimbabwean politician, serving as the Member of Parliament for Nketa and current Deputy Minister of Local Government and Public Works responsible for Local Authorities and Traditional Leadership. He was elected to the National Assembly during the 9 December 2023 by-election, following the withdrawal of Obert Manduna.
