= Nketa (constituency) =

Constituency of the Parliament of Zimbabwe

- National Assembly constituency for the Parliament of Zimbabwe
- District: Bulawayo
- Province: Bulawayo
- Electorate: 23,998 (2023)
- Major settlements: Nketa

Current constituency
- Number of members: 1
- Party: ZANU-PF
- Member: Albert Tawanda Mavunga

Nketa is a constituency of the National Assembly of the Parliament of Zimbabwe located in the city of Bulawayo in eastern Zimbabwe.

== Elections ==
In the 2023 Zimbabwean general election, Obert Manduna was elected from the Movement for Democratic Change Alliance.

== See also ==
- List of parliamentary constituencies of Zimbabwe
