= Sengezo Tshabangu =

Zimbabwean politician

Sengezo Tshabangu is a Zimbabwean politician. Since March 2024, Tshabangu has served in the Zimbabwe parliament as a Senator from Matabeleland North Province. He claims to be the interim Secretary General of the Citizens Coalition for Change (CCC). In October 2023, he recalled fifteen parliamentarians and seventeen councilors, including Masvingo's mayor, citing they were no longer party members in October. He went on to recall a further nine councillors, including Harare mayor Ian Makoni and his deputy on 9 November 2023. On 30 May 2024, National Assembly Speaker Advocate Jacob Mudenda announced that Tshabangu was appointed Leader of the Opposition in the Zimbabwe parliament. However, it has not yet reported if he was sworn in to this position. It was also revealed that no meeting was held for this decision among CCC MPs.

== Political career ==
Tshabangu was a member of the Movement for Democratic Change.

Tshabangu was part of the group that split from Tsvangirai in 2014, to form the People's Democratic Party, led by Tendai Biti. He rejoined the mainstream Movement for Democratic Change - Alliance when the alliance was formed ahead of the 2018 harmonised elections. He attended the meetings of the MDC Alliance key bodies that rebranded the MDC Alliance as it stood on 21 and 22 January 2022 as the Citizens Coalition for Change and adopted the alliance constitution as the constitution of the CCC.

=== Citizens Coalition for Change ===
Sengezo has recalled fifteen parliamentarians and twenty-six councillors as of 9 November 2023. Recently, a lady called Mavis Tshabangu Chilenji, a former secretary in the office of Emmerson Mnangagwa claimed that Sengezo is her son with the current president. He further recalled 52 more counsellors from 15 local authorities.

=== Zimbabwe parliament ===
On 3 March 2024, Tshabangu was sworn into the Zimbabwe parliament as a proportional representation (PR) senator. On May 30, 2024, National Assembly Speaker Advocate Jacob Mudenda announced that Tshabangu was made leader of the opposition. In addition, Chipinge South MP Clifford Hlatwayo was named as the CCC’s leader of the house and Nomathemba Ndlovu, the proportional representation MP for Matabeleland South, was named as chief whip. Tshabangu would also receive an appointment on the Parliament Standing Rules and Orders Committee. Despite being appointed, it has not yet been reported if they were sworn in to this opposition leadership positions. CCC MP Charlton Hwende, who was appointed to the parliament's Public Accounts Committee also protested Mudena's announcement by revealing that no meeting among CCC MPs ever took place concerning the parliament opposition leadership and committee appointments, stating that ”You can’t say there was a meeting of CCC because the party never sat down.”
