= Citizens Coalition for Change =

- Secretary-General: Sengezo Tshabangu
- President (Disputed): Welshman Ncube; Jameson Timba
- Founder: Nelson Chamisa
- Founded: 22 January 2022
- Split from: Movement for Democratic Change Alliance
- Headquarters: Harare
- Ideology: Social democracy Christian democracy Liberal democracy Civic nationalism Left-wing nationalism Social conservatism Anti-corruption
- Political position: Centre-left
- International affiliation: Progressive Alliance
- Colours: Yellow
- National Assembly: 86 / 280
- Senate: 27 / 90
- Pan-African Parliament: 0 / 5

Website
- www.ccczimbabwe.com

The Citizens Coalition for Change (CCC) is a Zimbabwean political party established in 2022 by former members of the Movement for Democratic Change Alliance.

== Background ==
Nelson Chamisa formed Citizens Coalition for Change (CCC) after losing a dispute over the Movement for Democratic Change Alliance against Douglas Mwonzora, leader of the Movement for Democratic Change - Tsvangirai (MDC-T). Chamisa proposed yellow and the raised index finger as the new colour and symbol of the party.

Following the formation of the CCC, several MDC Alliance MPs and councilors were accused of showing allegiance to Chamisa and recalled from parliament by Mwonzora, whom had taken over the MDC Alliance. This, alongside the deaths of some officials, left a number of vacancies in parliamentary seats, which triggered by-elections under Zimbabwean constitutional law. Elections for 28 seats were conducted on 26 March 2022 in which the newly formed CCC won 19 and ZANU–PF won 9 seats. Mwonzora's rump MDC Alliance did not secure any seats. The weeks preceding the by-election saw some government-sponsored violence against CCC (including violence at a CCC rally in Kwekwe which led to the stabbing and death of a party supporter, Mboneni Ncube, by suspected ZANU-PF supporters).

== 2023 recall of Members of Parliament ==
At its inception in 2022, the CCC party had its president Nelson Chamisa as the sole office holder. Chamisa refused to craft an interim constitution and party structures as interim leader. During this period of disorganization, Sengezo Tshabangu, another party member, began his campaign to claim the title and role of the interim secretary general of the party. His claim was rejected by Chamisa. It had been suggested that he represents an agitated group of the old generation of the MDC Alliance who were sidelined by Chamisa, most notably Tendai Biti and Welshman Ncube, two VPs of the former MDC Alliance. However, evidence to support these claims was insufficient.

On 3 October 2022, Tshabangu wrote letters to the speaker of the parliament, president of the senate, and minister of local government recalling MPs, senators and councillors who were elected on the CCC ticket. He submitted his own credentials and interim constitution to the parliament and ZEC, which essentially meant he was now the bona fide leader of the party. The letters were accepted and the MPs, senators and councillors were recalled. The recalled MPs, Senators and Councillors approached the high court of Zimbabwe claiming that Tshabangu was not a member of the CCC party, moreso the secretary general. However, this could not be proven due to the party's lack of constitution, party member list, and minutes of its meetings. Tshabangu thus took control of the CCC party following the high court's decision. The recalled MPs, senators and councillors approached the Supreme Court of Zimbabwe to counter Tshabangu's claim. The CCC party also approached the high court interdicting Tshabangu from using its party name, symbols and claiming to be the secretary general. Instead, Sengezo Tshabangu has submitted an interim constitution of the party which means he is now the bona fide leader of the party.

Chamisa resigned on 27 January 2024, claiming government interference had "contaminated" and "hijacked" the CCC.

== Post-Chamisa era ==
After Nelson Chamisa resigned as party president and member of the CCC in 2024, other members who were loyal to him also left the party. Among the notable departures were Rusty Markham and Fadzayi Mahere. In February 2024 it was announced that Welshman Ncube will serve as interim party leader on a 90-day rotational arrangement with Tendai Biti and Lynette Karenyi-Kore until the party holds its elective congress.

== Electoral history ==
=== Presidential elections ===
Election	Party candidate	Votes	Percentage	Votes	Percentage	Result
Election	Party candidate	First Round		Second Round		Result
2023	Nelson Chamisa	1,967,243	44.03%	—	—	Lost ✗

=== House of Assembly elections ===
Election	Party leader	Votes	%	Seats	+/–	Position	Result
2022 (by-election)	Nelson Chamisa			19 / 28	▲19	1st	Opposition
2023	Nelson Chamisa	1,856,393	41.46%	103 / 280	▲103	▼2nd	Opposition
2023 (by-election)	Nelson Chamisa			2 / 10	▼8		
2024 (by-election)	Unknown			0 / 6	▼6		

=== Senate elections ===
Election	Party leader	Seats	+/–	Position	Result
2023	Nelson Chamisa	27 / 80	▲27	2nd	Opposition
