= Results of the 2023 Zimbabwean general election =

2023 Zimbabwe election results

- 23 August 2023
- Presidential election
- Registered: 6,623,511 (▲16.28%)
- Turnout: 68.86% (▼16.33pp)
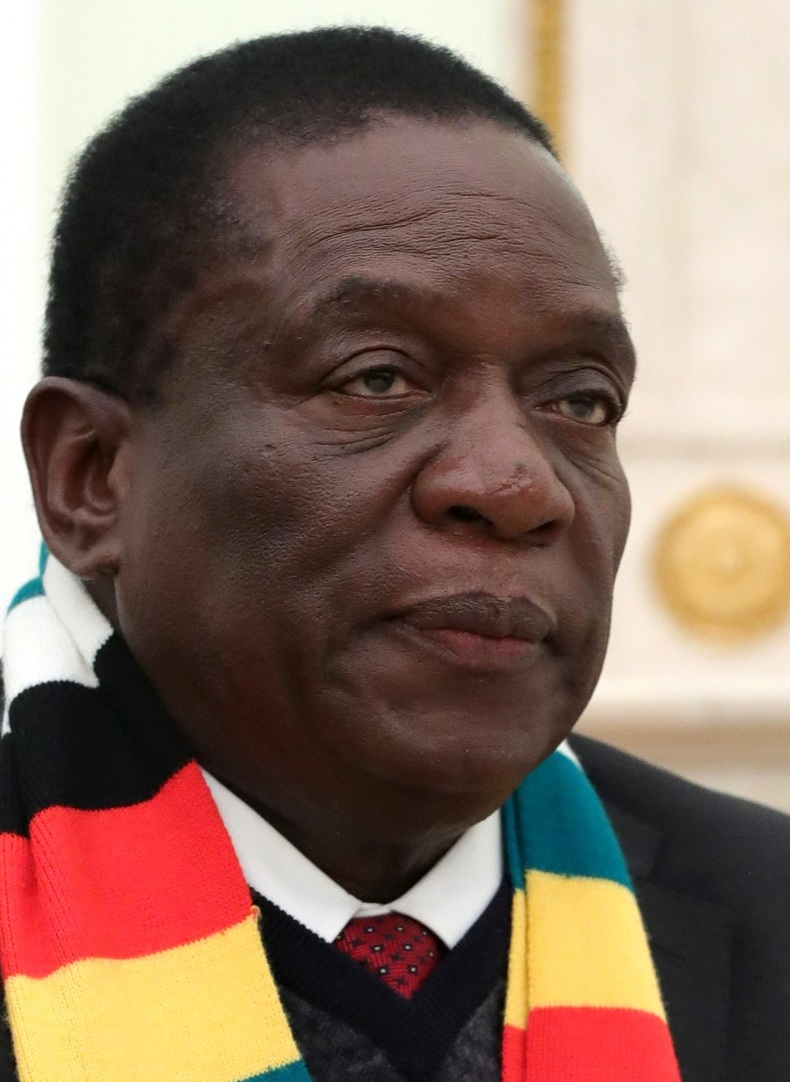

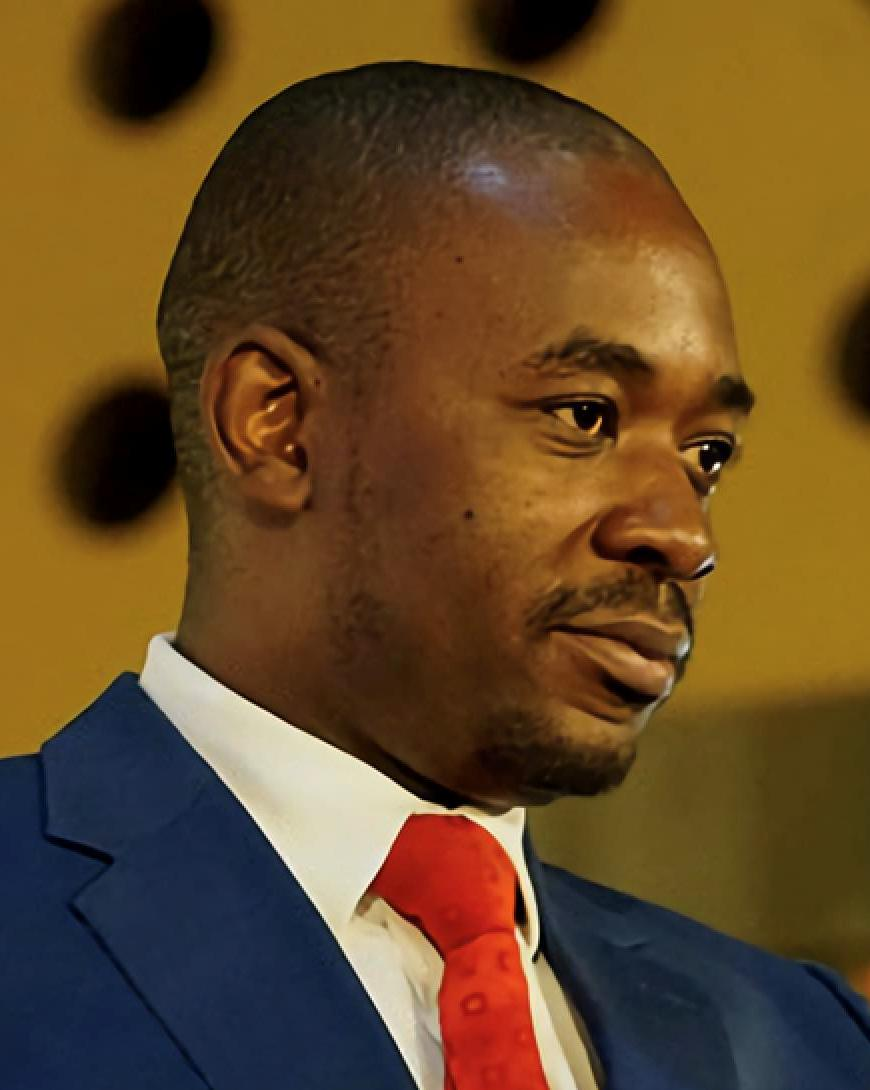
Candidate	Emmerson Mnangagwa	Nelson Chamisa
Party	ZANU–PF	CCC
Popular vote	2,350,711	1,967,343
Percentage	52.60%	44.03%
President before election
Emmerson Mnangagwa
ZANU–PF
Elected President
Emmerson Mnangagwa
ZANU–PF
- National Assembly
- All 280 seats in the National Assembly; 141 seats needed for a majority
Party	Leader	Vote %	Seats	+/–
ZANU–PF	Emmerson Mnangagwa	56.18	177	−2
CCC	Nelson Chamisa	41.46	103	New
This lists parties that won seats. See the complete results below.
- Senate
- 60 of the 80 seats in the Senate; 41 seats needed for a majority
Party	Leader	Seats	+/–
ZANU–PF	Emmerson Mnangagwa	33	−1
CCC	Nelson Chamisa	27	New
This lists parties that won seats. See the complete results below.
- Maps

The 2023 Zimbabwean general election was held in Zimbabwe on 23 August 2023 for the presidency and to set the membership of the 10th Parliament, consisting of the Senate and National Assembly.

Observer bodies described the elections as not being free and fair.

== Presidential Election ==
=== Summary ===
Presidential election results by constituency Emmerson Mnangagwa Nelson Chamisa

Emmerson Mnangagwa was re-elected president.

Candidate	Party	Votes	%
Emmerson Mnangagwa	ZANU–PF	2,350,711	52.60
Nelson Chamisa	Citizens Coalition for Change	1,967,343	44.03
Wilbert Mubaiwa	National People’s Congress	53,517	1.20
Douglas Mwonzora	Movement for Democratic Change – Tsvangirai	28,883	0.65
Joseph Makamba Busha	FreeZim Congress	18,816	0.42
Blessing Kasiyamhuru	Zimbabwe Partnership for Prosperity	13,060	0.29
Tapiwa Trust Chikohora	Zimbabwe Coalition for Peace and Development Party	10,230	0.23
Gwinyai Henry Muzorewa	United African National Council	7,053	0.16
Elisabeth Valerio	United Zimbabwe Alliance	6,989	0.16
Harry Peter Wilson	Democratic Opposition Party	6,743	0.15
Lovemore Madhuku	National Constitutional Assembly	5,323	0.12
Total		4,468,668	100.00
Valid votes		4,468,668	97.97
Invalid/blank votes		92,553	2.03
Total votes		4,561,221	100.00
Registered voters/turnout		6,623,511	68.86
Source: ZEC

=== Results by province ===
Results by Province
Province	Joseph Makamba Busha		Nelson Chamisa		Tapiwa Trust Chikohora		Blessing Kasiyamhuru		Lovemore Madhuku		Emmerson Mnangagwa		Wilbert Mubaiwa		Gwinyai Henry Muzorewa		Douglas Mwonzora		Elisabeth Valerio		Harry Peter Wilson		Total Votes Rejected		Total Votes Cast	Total Valid Votes Cast	Voter Population	Voter Turnout %
Province	FreeZim Congress		CCC		ZCPD		ZIPP		NCA		ZANU–PF		NPC		UANC		MDC-T		UZA		DOP		Total Votes Rejected		Total Votes Cast	Total Valid Votes Cast	Voter Population	Voter Turnout %
Province	Votes	%	Votes	%	Votes	%	Votes	%	Votes	%	Votes	%	Votes	%	Votes	%	Votes	%	Votes	%	Votes	%	Votes	%	Total Votes Cast	Total Valid Votes Cast	Voter Population	Voter Turnout %
Bulawayo	437	0.26	131,037	78.52	306	0.18	255	0.15	129	0.08	31,053	18.61	1,389	0.83	230	0.14	1,004	0.60	803	0.48	249	0.15	2,040	1.21	168,932	166,892	287,352	58.79
Harare	1,236	0.17	517,494	71.46	778	0.11	804	0.11	543	0.07	193,881	26.77	4,958	0.68	470	0.06	2,337	0.32	1,365	0.19	325	0.04	10,071	1.37	734,262	724,191	1,084,601	67.70
Manicaland	2,496	0.45	240,672	43.47	1,547	0.28	1,814	0.33	1,074	0.19	290,960	52.56	8,588	1.55	993	0.18	3,891	0.70	713	0.13	877	0.16	11,354	2.01	564,979	553,625	829,324	68.13
Mashonaland Central	2,089	0.44	95,508	19.97	785	0.16	1,289	0.27	455	0.10	370,175	77.41	4,058	0.85	586	0.12	2,280	0.48	358	0.07	648	0.14	9,200	1.89	487,431	478,231	625,968	77.87
Mashonaland East	1,435	0.26	184,827	33.51	892	0.16	914	0.17	415	0.08	354,081	64.20	5,101	0.92	671	0.12	2,178	0.39	435	0.08	563	0.10	10,694	1.90	562,206	551,512	773,281	72.70
Mashonaland West	2,579	0.47	209,744	38.10	1,165	0.21	1,667	0.30	529	0.10	323,523	58.77	5,664	1.03	825	0.15	3,157	0.57	757	0.14	887	0.16	13,931	2.47	564,428	550,497	785,583	71.85
Masvingo	2,634	0.53	167,813	33.96	1,454	0.29	2,240	0.45	637	0.13	307,383	62.21	6,798	1.38	908	0.18	2,825	0.57	540	0.11	896	0.18	11,087	2.19	505,215	494,128	723,934	69.79
Matabeleland North	1,425	0.65	111,609	51.03	955	0.44	1,060	0.48	489	0.22	91,306	41.74	5,356	2.45	751	0.34	4,249	1.94	826	0.38	703	0.32	6,594	2.93	225,323	218,729	371,701	60.62
Matabeleland South	1,331	0.76	80,365	45.89	970	0.55	1,035	0.59	416	0.24	82,511	47.12	3,997	2.28	702	0.40	2,673	1.53	503	0.29	612	0.35	4,772	2.65	179,887	175,115	300,768	59.81
Midlands	3,154	0.57	228,274	41.08	1,378	0.25	1,982	0.36	636	0.11	305,838	55.03	7,608	1.37	917	0.17	4,289	0.77	689	0.12	983	0.18	12,810	2.25	568,558	555,748	840,999	67.61
National Total	18,816	0.42	1,967,343	44.03	10,230	0.23	13,060	0.29	5,323	0.12	2,350,711	52.60	53,517	1.20	7,053	0.16	28,883	0.65	6,989	0.16	6,743	0.15	92,553	2.03	4,561,221	4,468,668	6,623,511	68.86

=== Results by constituency ===
Results by constituency
Constituency	Province	Joseph Makamba Busha		Nelson Chamisa		Tapiwa Trust Chikohora		Blessing Kasiyamhuru		Lovemore Madhuku		Emmerson Mnangagwa		Wilbert Mubaiwa		Gwinyai Henry Muzorewa		Douglas Mwonzora		Elisabeth Valerio		Harry Peter Wilson		Total Votes Rejected		Total Votes Cast	Total Valid Votes Cast	Voter Population	Voter Turnout %
Constituency	Province	FreeZim Congress		CCC		ZCPD		ZIPP		NCA		ZANU–PF		NPC		UANC		MDC-T		UZA		DOP		Total Votes Rejected		Total Votes Cast	Total Valid Votes Cast	Voter Population	Voter Turnout %
Constituency	Province	Votes	%	Votes	%	Votes	%	Votes	%	Votes	%	Votes	%	Votes	%	Votes	%	Votes	%	Votes	%	Votes	%	Votes	%	Total Votes Cast	Total Valid Votes Cast	Voter Population	Voter Turnout %
Beitbridge East	MBS	97	0.69	5,541	39.16	59	0.42	74	0.52	33	0.23	8,000	56.53	152	1.07	44	0.31	101	0.71	21	0.15	29	0.20	464	3.17	14,615	14,151	25,046	58.35
Beitbridge West	MBS	92	0.58	7,937	50.07	69	0.44	64	0.40	33	0.21	7,263	45.82	160	1.01	27	0.17	145	0.91	23	0.15	38	0.24	393	2.42	16,244	15,851	27,034	60.09
Bikita East	MVG	118	0.69	6,781	39.47	52	0.30	118	0.69	22	0.13	9,483	55.20	380	2.21	34	0.20	130	0.76	20	0.12	42	0.24	640	3.59	17,820	17,180	24,925	71.49
Bikita South	MVG	129	0.72	6,581	36.78	61	0.34	77	0.43	28	0.16	10,396	58.10	359	2.01	54	0.30	132	0.74	21	0.12	56	0.31	496	2.70	18,390	17,894	26,383	69.70
Bikita West	MVG	88	0.44	8,015	39.87	67	0.33	63	0.31	25	0.12	11,249	55.95	364	1.81	39	0.19	132	0.66	23	0.11	40	0.20	510	2.47	20,615	20,105	28,737	71.74
Bindura North	MSC	58	0.20	13,046	45.38	28	0.10	35	0.12	11	0.04	15,241	53.01	175	0.61	14	0.05	94	0.33	29	0.10	18	0.06	332	1.14	29,081	28,749	38,583	75.37
Bindura South	MSC	152	0.56	8,979	33.24	57	0.21	98	0.36	29	0.11	17,041	63.09	331	1.23	35	0.13	219	0.81	39	0.14	29	0.11	535	1.94	27,544	27,009	37,755	72.95
Binga North	MBN	107	0.45	13,578	57.23	76	0.32	54	0.23	79	0.33	8,791	37.06	686	2.89	45	0.19	226	0.95	26	0.11	56	0.24	997	4.03	24,721	23,724	34,164	72.36
Binga South	MBN	136	0.70	10,689	54.68	92	0.47	107	0.55	56	0.29	7,203	36.84	764	3.91	68	0.35	340	1.74	31	0.16	64	0.33	982	4.78	20,532	19,550	32,939	62.33
Bubi	MBN	132	0.71	5,509	29.82	70	0.38	115	0.62	32	0.17	11,692	63.29	398	2.15	72	0.39	353	1.91	42	0.23	59	0.32	461	2.43	18,935	18,474	30,533	62.01
Budiriro North	HRE	40	0.16	19,901	79.20	31	0.12	31	0.12	33	0.13	4,794	19.08	146	0.58	19	0.08	74	0.29	46	0.18	11	0.04	288	1.13	25,414	25,126	38,340	66.29
Budiriro South	HRE	29	0.14	17,177	81.17	16	0.08	16	0.08	21	0.10	3,632	17.16	173	0.82	13	0.06	60	0.28	21	0.10	5	0.02	266	1.24	21,429	21,163	33,332	64.29
Buhera Central	MCL	159	0.97	5,152	31.42	80	0.49	137	0.84	40	0.24	10,167	62.01	318	1.94	43	0.26	204	1.24	63	0.38	33	0.20	477	2.83	16,873	16,396	25,570	65.99
Buhera North	MCL	91	0.48	7,174	37.73	48	0.25	60	0.32	15	0.08	11,159	58.69	278	1.46	33	0.17	114	0.60	19	0.10	22	0.12	339	1.75	19,352	19,013	27,819	69.56
Buhera South	MCL	164	0.96	7,606	44.41	89	0.52	114	0.67	43	0.25	8,423	49.19	378	2.21	46	0.27	207	1.21	24	0.14	31	0.18	423	2.41	17,548	17,125	26,839	65.38
Buhera West	MCL	101	0.55	6,837	37.36	55	0.30	77	0.42	26	0.14	10,540	57.60	408	2.23	39	0.21	167	0.91	11	0.06	39	0.21	423	2.26	18,723	18,300	27,414	68.30
Bulawayo Central	BYO	39	0.27	11,297	79.31	15	0.11	9	0.06	7	0.05	2,661	18.68	72	0.51	4	0.03	45	0.32	70	0.49	25	0.18	151	1.05	14,395	14,244	25,804	55.79
Bulawayo North	BYO	28	0.21	10,451	77.29	21	0.16	19	0.14	10	0.07	2,715	20.08	71	0.53	13	0.10	54	0.40	114	0.84	26	0.19	240	1.74	13,762	13,522	22,735	60.53
Bulawayo South	BYO	32	0.22	11,648	81.00	24	0.17	21	0.15	11	0.08	2,420	16.83	72	0.50	15	0.10	69	0.48	51	0.35	17	0.12	147	1.01	14,527	14,380	24,024	60.47
Bulilima	MBS	111	0.75	6,489	43.61	96	0.65	162	1.09	43	0.29	7,023	47.20	442	2.97	117	0.79	261	1.75	46	0.31	88	0.59	782	4.99	15,660	14,878	26,261	59.63
Chakari	MSW	68	0.24	6,379	22.25	35	0.12	89	0.31	14	0.05	21,807	76.05	122	0.43	18	0.06	93	0.32	17	0.06	34	0.12	783	2.66	29,459	28,676	40,456	72.82
Chegutu East	MSW	117	0.47	6,442	26.02	60	0.24	104	0.42	26	0.11	17,490	70.65	253	1.02	33	0.13	170	0.69	25	0.10	36	0.15	652	2.57	25,408	24,756	35,113	72.36
Chegutu West	MSW	70	0.27	14,591	56.94	36	0.14	54	0.21	18	0.07	10,319	40.27	264	1.03	30	0.12	154	0.60	67	0.26	24	0.09	455	1.74	26,082	25,627	37,087	70.33
Chikanga	MCL	16	0.09	14,403	78.77	11	0.06	17	0.09	17	0.09	3,610	19.74	108	0.59	6	0.03	31	0.17	47	0.26	19	0.10	152	0.82	18,437	18,285	28,697	64.25
Chikomba East	MSE	102	0.56	6,531	35.54	58	0.32	65	0.35	23	0.13	10,967	59.68	389	2.12	44	0.24	147	0.80	15	0.08	36	0.20	431	2.29	18,808	18,377	27,879	67.46
Chikomba West	MSE	72	0.26	9,095	33.00	38	0.14	42	0.15	18	0.07	17,933	65.07	204	0.74	21	0.08	78	0.28	36	0.13	24	0.09	468	1.67	28,029	27,561	40,741	68.80
Chimanimani East	MCL	113	0.49	6,234	27.19	61	0.27	120	0.52	28	0.12	15,855	69.15	282	1.23	44	0.19	118	0.51	28	0.12	45	0.20	462	1.98	23,390	22,928	33,219	70.41
Chimanimani West	MCL	94	0.36	9,640	36.88	48	0.18	85	0.33	34	0.13	15,548	59.48	444	1.70	43	0.16	166	0.64	14	0.05	25	0.10	460	1.73	26,601	26,141	37,096	71.71
Chinhoyi	MSW	41	0.16	18,614	71.89	33	0.13	22	0.08	20	0.08	6,798	26.26	220	0.85	16	0.06	82	0.32	33	0.13	13	0.05	305	1.16	26,197	25,892	38,059	68.83
Chipinge Central	MCL	112	0.46	10,368	42.74	61	0.25	71	0.29	43	0.18	13,056	53.82	311	1.28	48	0.20	127	0.52	31	0.13	29	0.12	609	2.45	24,866	24,257	36,740	67.68
Chipinge East	MCL	114	0.55	7,675	36.84	78	0.37	65	0.31	107	0.51	12,093	58.04	392	1.88	57	0.27	177	0.85	17	0.08	59	0.28	652	3.03	21,486	20,834	32,419	66.28
Chipinge South	MCL	200	0.97	9,539	46.19	152	0.74	135	0.65	233	1.13	9,331	45.18	557	2.70	105	0.51	259	1.25	53	0.26	89	0.43	705	3.30	21,358	20,653	34,236	62.38
Chiredzi Central	MVG	27	0.13	13,416	64.43	30	0.14	18	0.09	7	0.03	7,002	33.63	230	1.10	9	0.04	64	0.31	9	0.04	10	0.05	230	1.09	21,052	20,822	29,570	71.19
Chiredzi East	MVG	99	0.54	3,572	19.40	68	0.37	94	0.51	40	0.22	14,099	76.55	214	1.16	46	0.25	128	0.70	18	0.10	39	0.21	483	2.56	18,900	18,417	27,056	69.86
Chiredzi North	MVG	65	0.31	3,014	14.18	33	0.16	64	0.30	8	0.04	17,841	83.92	123	0.58	34	0.16	47	0.22	9	0.04	21	0.10	285	1.32	21,544	21,259	27,883	77.27
Chiredzi South	MVG	198	1.04	6,083	32.07	132	0.70	141	0.74	92	0.49	11,357	59.87	485	2.56	86	0.45	248	1.31	52	0.27	94	0.50	67	0.35	19,035	18,968	29,285	65.00
Chiredzi West	MVG	65	0.30	6,383	29.35	38	0.17	50	0.23	12	0.06	14,955	68.76	156	0.72	16	0.07	55	0.25	5	0.02	16	0.07	244	1.11	21,995	21,751	29,467	74.64
Chirumanzu	MID	65	0.37	6,913	39.12	42	0.24	62	0.35	16	0.09	10,071	56.99	335	1.90	27	0.15	89	0.50	27	0.15	24	0.14	343	1.90	18,014	17,671	25,192	71.51
Chirumanzu-Zibagwe	MID	58	0.25	5,694	24.88	39	0.17	77	0.34	16	0.07	16,712	73.03	148	0.65	24	0.10	82	0.36	16	0.07	17	0.07	464	1.99	23,347	22,883	34,106	68.45
Chitungwiza North	HRE	26	0.11	17,073	69.84	34	0.14	18	0.07	14	0.06	6,961	28.48	162	0.66	15	0.06	97	0.40	30	0.12	16	0.07	316	1.28	24,762	24,446	35,942	68.89
Chitungwiza South	HRE	36	0.15	17,463	73.30	17	0.07	37	0.16	10	0.04	5,894	24.74	180	0.76	20	0.08	104	0.44	54	0.23	9	0.04	294	1.22	24,118	23,824	35,312	68.30
Chivi Central	MVG	61	0.36	5,618	33.36	66	0.39	81	0.48	25	0.15	10,520	62.47	279	1.66	25	0.15	116	0.69	21	0.12	28	0.17	474	2.74	17,314	16,840	25,289	68.46
Chivi North	MVG	90	0.51	6,179	34.92	56	0.32	74	0.42	18	0.10	10,805	61.06	304	1.72	45	0.25	87	0.49	13	0.07	24	0.14	373	2.06	18,068	17,695	25,508	70.83
Chivi South	MVG	92	0.53	4,325	24.74	72	0.41	77	0.44	17	0.10	12,550	71.80	178	1.02	36	0.21	80	0.46	18	0.10	35	0.20	485	2.70	17,965	17,480	26,061	68.93
Chiwundura	MID	65	0.36	7,499	41.43	23	0.13	57	0.31	18	0.10	10,190	56.30	120	0.66	13	0.07	81	0.45	19	0.10	15	0.08	283	1.54	18,383	18,100	27,986	65.69
Churu	HRE	66	0.20	19,665	59.92	49	0.15	49	0.15	19	0.06	12,587	38.35	219	0.67	22	0.07	98	0.30	23	0.07	21	0.06	516	1.55	33,334	32,818	45,558	73.17
Cowdray Park	BYO	40	0.27	11,205	75.23	29	0.19	24	0.16	10	0.07	3,316	22.26	115	0.77	23	0.15	85	0.57	37	0.25	10	0.07	149	0.99	15,043	14,894	27,568	54.57
Dangamvura	MCL	24	0.10	17,455	74.11	22	0.09	15	0.06	37	0.16	5,723	24.30	146	0.62	20	0.08	72	0.31	32	0.14	8	0.03	196	0.83	23,750	23,554	37,208	63.83
Dzivarasekwa	HRE	46	0.18	17,610	68.13	26	0.10	23	0.09	18	0.07	7,751	29.99	214	0.83	16	0.06	86	0.33	46	0.18	12	0.05	492	1.87	26,340	25,848	37,162	70.88
Emakhandeni-Luveve	BYO	49	0.37	10,531	78.95	29	0.22	33	0.25	15	0.11	2,322	17.41	123	0.92	24	0.18	129	0.97	65	0.49	18	0.13	174	1.29	13,512	13,338	23,116	58.45
Entumbane-Njube	BYO	41	0.32	10,181	78.87	26	0.20	17	0.13	10	0.08	2,340	18.13	128	0.99	16	0.12	73	0.57	61	0.47	16	0.12	160	1.22	13,069	12,909	22,150	59.00
Epworth North	HRE	55	0.23	15,177	62.27	41	0.17	35	0.14	11	0.05	8,715	35.76	209	0.86	15	0.06	92	0.38	11	0.05	12	0.05	538	2.16	24,911	24,373	38,244	65.14
Epworth South	HRE	42	0.23	10,818	58.66	40	0.22	35	0.19	14	0.08	7,150	38.77	176	0.95	21	0.11	108	0.59	19	0.10	19	0.10	447	2.37	18,889	18,442	28,279	66.80
Glen Norah	HRE	41	0.19	17,536	81.57	11	0.05	16	0.07	6	0.03	3,588	16.69	166	0.77	16	0.07	71	0.33	40	0.19	6	0.03	207	0.95	21,704	21,497	33,763	64.28
Glenview North	HRE	62	0.29	16,951	79.21	35	0.16	30	0.14	20	0.09	4,013	18.75	156	0.73	16	0.07	58	0.27	45	0.21	13	0.06	337	1.55	21,736	21,399	35,579	61.09
Glenview South	HRE	35	0.19	15,423	83.38	37	0.20	36	0.19	16	0.09	2,748	14.86	105	0.57	8	0.04	47	0.25	35	0.19	8	0.04	202	1.08	18,700	18,498	31,153	60.03
Gokwe Central	MID	154	0.64	11,905	49.22	54	0.22	68	0.28	26	0.11	11,349	46.93	350	1.45	40	0.17	154	0.64	21	0.09	64	0.26	428	1.74	24,613	24,185	36,376	67.66
Gokwe Chireya	MID	137	0.76	3,867	21.58	62	0.35	92	0.51	36	0.20	13,189	73.60	243	1.36	45	0.25	182	1.02	13	0.07	54	0.30	523	2.84	18,443	17,920	26,205	70.38
Gokwe Gumunyu	MID	77	0.46	3,327	19.83	32	0.19	69	0.41	18	0.11	12,870	76.70	222	1.32	27	0.16	99	0.59	9	0.05	29	0.17	384	2.24	17,163	16,779	24,642	69.65
Gokwe Kabuyuni	MID	191	0.88	6,936	32.12	89	0.41	116	0.54	48	0.22	13,258	61.40	503	2.33	50	0.23	300	1.39	27	0.13	76	0.35	583	2.63	22,177	21,594	31,023	71.49
Gokwe Kana	MID	205	1.06	5,323	27.40	84	0.43	101	0.52	35	0.18	12,917	66.49	401	2.06	50	0.26	228	1.17	18	0.09	64	0.33	604	3.02	20,030	19,426	29,874	67.05
Gokwe Mapfungautsi	MID	159	0.87	5,406	29.55	67	0.37	75	0.41	26	0.14	11,890	64.98	328	1.79	37	0.20	249	1.36	16	0.09	44	0.24	502	2.67	18,799	18,297	26,674	70.48
Gokwe Nembudzia	MID	133	0.76	7,996	45.74	52	0.30	58	0.33	27	0.15	8,508	48.67	468	2.68	27	0.15	156	0.89	24	0.14	33	0.19	383	2.14	17,865	17,482	27,369	65.27
Gokwe Sengwa	MID	163	0.97	3,600	21.42	45	0.27	82	0.49	27	0.16	12,315	73.28	329	1.96	30	0.18	162	0.96	11	0.07	41	0.24	530	3.06	17,335	16,805	24,898	69.62
Gokwe Sasame	MID	240	1.18	7,936	39.04	88	0.43	118	0.58	50	0.25	10,904	53.64	570	2.80	53	0.26	286	1.41	22	0.11	62	0.30	654	3.12	20,983	20,329	30,302	69.25
Goromonzi North	MSE	62	0.24	11,872	46.81	55	0.22	34	0.13	25	0.10	12,879	50.78	234	0.92	24	0.09	135	0.53	22	0.09	19	0.07	536	2.07	25,897	25,361	37,976	68.19
Goromonzi South	MSE	65	0.20	17,689	55.46	34	0.11	37	0.12	17	0.05	13,597	42.63	284	0.89	26	0.08	112	0.35	17	0.05	15	0.05	513	1.58	32,406	31,893	44,732	72.44
Goromonzi West	MSE	72	0.29	13,235	53.24	50	0.20	36	0.14	17	0.07	10,940	44.01	272	1.09	31	0.12	112	0.45	57	0.23	37	0.15	340	1.35	25,199	24,859	36,116	69.77
Guruve North	MSC	119	0.43	4,121	15.01	34	0.12	77	0.28	29	0.11	22,697	82.69	177	0.64	28	0.10	101	0.37	14	0.05	50	0.18	377	1.35	27,824	27,447	34,456	80.75
Guruve South	MSC	156	0.63	4,701	18.95	46	0.19	81	0.33	27	0.11	19,140	77.15	383	1.54	63	0.25	150	0.60	28	0.11	34	0.14	479	1.89	25,288	24,809	33,942	74.50
Gutu Central	MVG	79	0.40	8,086	40.44	54	0.27	49	0.25	12	0.06	11,282	56.43	268	1.34	23	0.12	89	0.45	23	0.12	28	0.14	370	1.82	20,363	19,993	28,550	71.32
Gutu East	MVG	146	0.87	5,722	33.96	62	0.37	57	0.34	30	0.18	10,282	61.03	340	2.02	27	0.16	124	0.74	13	0.08	45	0.27	402	2.33	17,250	16,848	24,847	69.42
Gutu South	MVG	72	0.42	6,581	38.67	59	0.35	59	0.35	25	0.15	9,643	56.67	384	2.26	31	0.18	116	0.68	16	0.09	31	0.18	350	2.02	17,367	17,017	24,856	69.87
Gutu West	MVG	47	0.26	3,968	21.86	38	0.21	58	0.32	18	0.10	13,738	75.67	155	0.85	19	0.10	72	0.40	14	0.08	27	0.15	335	1.81	18,489	18,154	25,646	72.09
Gwanda North	MBS	85	0.59	8,107	56.37	87	0.60	79	0.55	41	0.29	5,300	36.85	312	2.17	44	0.31	250	1.74	34	0.24	44	0.31	354	2.40	14,737	14,383	24,825	59.36
Gwanda South	MBS	147	1.09	6,419	47.42	108	0.80	83	0.61	42	0.31	5,724	42.28	399	2.95	89	0.66	312	2.30	127	0.94	87	0.64	278	2.01	13,815	13,537	24,117	57.28
Gwanda Tshitaudze	MBS	96	0.65	6,619	44.84	59	0.40	53	0.36	23	0.16	7,465	50.58	201	1.36	44	0.30	139	0.94	31	0.21	30	0.20	324	2.15	15,084	14,760	25,548	59.04
Gweru Urban	MID	20	0.11	13,253	71.48	27	0.15	12	0.06	13	0.07	5,023	27.09	87	0.47	5	0.03	54	0.29	42	0.23	6	0.03	173	0.92	18,715	18,542	30,455	61.45
Harare Central	HRE	36	0.15	18,862	78.03	20	0.08	30	0.12	28	0.12	4,978	20.59	92	0.38	12	0.05	37	0.15	67	0.28	10	0.04	270	1.10	24,442	24,172	39,127	62.47
Harare East	HRE	22	0.09	16,996	71.36	6	0.03	12	0.05	17	0.07	6,457	27.11	126	0.53	8	0.03	64	0.27	100	0.42	8	0.03	345	1.43	24,161	23,816	36,535	66.13
Harare South	HRE	57	0.21	13,896	51.82	35	0.13	37	0.14	19	0.07	12,394	46.22	220	0.82	26	0.10	85	0.32	25	0.09	20	0.07	440	1.61	27,254	26,814	39,759	68.55
Harare West	HRE	20	0.09	19,195	82.74	13	0.06	12	0.05	20	0.09	3,762	16.22	62	0.27	7	0.03	47	0.20	58	0.25	2	0.01	145	0.62	23,343	23,198	35,401	65.94
Hatcliffe	HRE	53	0.22	16,515	69.90	28	0.12	37	0.16	16	0.07	6,521	27.60	233	0.99	20	0.08	103	0.44	83	0.35	18	0.08	369	1.54	23,996	23,627	35,326	67.93
Hatfield	HRE	21	0.09	19,056	80.05	16	0.07	12	0.05	16	0.07	4,442	18.66	109	0.46	15	0.06	42	0.18	71	0.30	6	0.03	252	1.05	24,058	23,806	35,752	67.29
Headlands	MCL	55	0.29	4,496	23.44	42	0.22	50	0.26	24	0.13	14,156	73.81	202	1.05	31	0.16	95	0.50	10	0.05	17	0.09	386	1.97	19,564	19,178	27,393	71.42
Highfield	HRE	31	0.15	16,986	81.06	22	0.10	16	0.08	18	0.09	3,599	17.17	154	0.73	15	0.07	78	0.37	28	0.13	8	0.04	246	1.16	21,201	20,955	31,706	66.87
Hunyani	HRE	70	0.26	13,571	50.90	34	0.13	70	0.26	12	0.05	12,452	46.70	256	0.96	28	0.11	124	0.47	31	0.12	16	0.06	617	2.26	27,281	26,664	37,623	72.51
Hurungwe Central	MSW	57	0.25	9,846	42.94	25	0.11	33	0.14	16	0.07	12,614	55.01	171	0.75	15	0.07	91	0.40	37	0.16	26	0.11	635	2.69	23,566	22,931	31,710	74.32
Hurungwe East	MSW	160	0.60	4,179	15.72	58	0.22	94	0.35	35	0.13	21,589	81.19	218	0.82	39	0.15	156	0.59	14	0.05	48	0.18	825	3.01	27,415	26,590	35,859	76.45
Hurungwe North	MSW	174	0.65	7,741	29.13	61	0.23	79	0.30	27	0.10	17,880	67.29	271	1.02	40	0.15	219	0.82	22	0.08	57	0.21	1,075	3.89	27,646	26,571	36,705	75.32
Hurungwe West	MSW	189	0.91	7,387	35.76	52	0.25	107	0.52	35	0.17	12,091	58.54	395	1.91	58	0.28	254	1.23	29	0.14	59	0.29	1,066	4.91	21,722	20,656	30,026	72.34
Hwange Central	MBN	21	0.14	12,548	81.13	19	0.12	10	0.06	9	0.06	2,568	16.60	168	1.09	13	0.08	84	0.54	22	0.14	5	0.03	168	1.07	15,635	15,467	24,185	64.65
Hwange East	MBN	139	0.77	10,060	55.75	70	0.39	71	0.39	53	0.29	6,728	37.29	414	2.29	45	0.25	349	1.93	51	0.28	64	0.35	414	2.24	18,458	18,044	30,545	60.43
Hwange West	MBN	35	0.20	11,664	66.45	35	0.20	36	0.21	13	0.07	5,335	30.39	176	1.00	20	0.11	143	0.81	74	0.42	22	0.13	315	1.76	17,868	17,553	30,305	58.96
Insiza North	MBS	106	0.73	4,607	31.86	62	0.43	90	0.62	22	0.15	8,961	61.96	294	2.03	23	0.16	216	1.49	42	0.29	39	0.27	395	2.66	14,857	14,462	24,274	61.21
Insiza South	MBS	137	0.89	6,707	43.34	75	0.48	99	0.64	34	0.22	7,710	49.82	415	2.68	48	0.31	194	1.25	14	0.09	43	0.28	317	2.01	15,793	15,476	25,098	62.93
Kadoma Central	MSW	39	0.17	16,319	69.95	21	0.09	15	0.06	13	0.06	6,572	28.17	160	0.69	15	0.06	115	0.49	47	0.20	14	0.06	404	1.70	23,734	23,330	36,245	65.48
Kariba	MSW	144	0.59	12,210	50.31	57	0.23	68	0.28	19	0.08	11,048	45.52	443	1.83	37	0.15	170	0.70	31	0.13	41	0.17	689	2.76	24,957	24,268	35,661	69.98
Kuwadzana East	HRE	38	0.17	18,173	79.29	26	0.11	19	0.08	17	0.07	4,274	18.65	210	0.92	22	0.10	85	0.37	50	0.22	6	0.03	332	1.43	23,252	22,920	35,543	65.42
Kuwadzana West	HRE	48	0.19	19,527	76.33	23	0.09	29	0.11	21	0.08	5,597	21.88	173	0.68	19	0.07	99	0.39	40	0.16	7	0.03	279	1.08	25,862	25,583	37,927	68.19
Kwekwe Central	MID	33	0.19	11,826	66.92	19	0.11	15	0.08	7	0.04	5,559	31.45	83	0.47	17	0.10	68	0.38	35	0.20	11	0.06	266	1.48	17,939	17,673	27,302	65.71
Lobengula-Magwegwe	BYO	31	0.22	11,493	80.48	35	0.25	28	0.20	9	0.06	2,293	16.06	160	1.12	28	0.20	119	0.83	67	0.47	18	0.13	153	1.06	14,434	14,281	25,615	56.35
Lupane East	MBN	118	0.86	6,090	44.56	79	0.58	85	0.62	28	0.20	6,390	46.75	330	2.41	61	0.45	326	2.39	78	0.57	82	0.60	393	2.80	14,060	13,667	24,185	58.14
Lupane West	MBN	141	0.88	7,670	47.88	89	0.56	101	0.63	44	0.27	6,957	43.43	472	2.95	61	0.38	345	2.15	65	0.41	74	0.46	611	3.67	16,630	16,019	28,482	58.39
Mabvuku Tafara	HRE	39	0.14	20,420	73.29	38	0.14	23	0.08	9	0.03	7,010	25.16	188	0.67	15	0.05	70	0.25	35	0.13	14	0.05	278	0.99	28,139	27,861	38,002	74.05
Magunje	MSW	133	0.71	8,277	43.92	61	0.32	82	0.44	21	0.11	9,605	50.97	373	1.98	47	0.25	181	0.96	23	0.12	43	0.23	657	3.37	19,503	18,846	26,840	72.66
Makonde	MSW	184	0.64	5,914	20.44	80	0.28	133	0.46	31	0.11	22,018	76.11	274	0.95	68	0.24	154	0.53	26	0.09	47	0.16	723	2.44	29,652	28,929	39,392	75.27
Makoni Central	MCL	41	0.20	12,194	60.52	32	0.16	23	0.11	14	0.07	7,434	36.90	258	1.28	12	0.06	110	0.55	15	0.07	16	0.08	267	1.31	20,416	20,149	29,610	68.95
Makoni North	MCL	97	0.53	6,129	33.18	54	0.29	75	0.41	25	0.14	11,526	62.40	352	1.91	39	0.21	134	0.73	18	0.10	23	0.12	402	2.13	18,874	18,472	26,941	70.06
Makoni South	MCL	99	0.43	7,725	33.89	52	0.23	68	0.30	33	0.14	14,224	62.40	384	1.68	36	0.16	123	0.54	12	0.05	39	0.17	426	1.83	23,221	22,795	33,512	69.29
Makoni West	MCL	99	0.57	6,456	37.40	68	0.39	63	0.36	26	0.15	9,961	57.70	361	2.09	38	0.22	142	0.82	16	0.09	33	0.19	343	1.95	17,606	17,263	26,036	67.62
Mangwe	MBS	91	0.60	8,116	53.89	74	0.49	59	0.39	50	0.33	5,971	39.65	303	2.01	62	0.41	223	1.48	61	0.41	51	0.34	320	2.08	15,381	15,061	25,204	61.03
Maramba-Pfungwe	MSE	30	0.11	1,352	4.93	12	0.04	18	0.07	15	0.05	25,859	94.30	72	0.26	20	0.07	24	0.09	7	0.03	12	0.04	341	1.23	27,762	27,421	32,730	84.82
Marondera Central	MSE	36	0.14	17,501	66.76	29	0.11	17	0.06	11	0.04	8,340	31.81	164	0.63	12	0.05	64	0.24	35	0.13	7	0.03	279	1.05	26,495	26,216	38,119	69.51
Marondera East	MSE	38	0.20	4,303	22.55	20	0.10	36	0.19	19	0.10	14,408	75.51	144	0.75	20	0.10	59	0.31	17	0.09	18	0.09	382	1.96	19,464	19,082	27,083	71.87
Marondera West	MSE	88	0.29	12,305	40.67	59	0.19	55	0.18	21	0.07	17,139	56.64	378	1.25	32	0.11	124	0.41	24	0.08	34	0.11	554	1.80	30,813	30,259	43,190	71.34
Masvingo Central	MVG	134	0.78	7,273	42.35	73	0.43	140	0.82	37	0.22	8,921	51.94	365	2.13	35	0.20	154	0.90	12	0.07	31	0.18	445	2.53	17,620	17,175	25,834	68.20
Masvingo North	MVG	40	0.19	8,956	43.12	20	0.10	56	0.27	12	0.06	11,349	54.65	196	0.94	27	0.13	67	0.32	19	0.09	26	0.13	481	2.26	21,249	20,768	30,916	68.73
Masvingo South	MVG	165	1.00	5,759	34.94	97	0.59	176	1.07	32	0.19	9,653	58.56	312	1.89	58	0.35	173	1.05	22	0.13	37	0.22	467	2.75	16,951	16,484	25,153	67.39
Masvingo Urban	MVG	27	0.12	15,647	72.44	12	0.06	31	0.14	16	0.07	5,636	26.09	108	0.50	12	0.06	56	0.26	51	0.24	5	0.02	196	0.90	21,797	21,601	33,514	65.04
Masvingo West	MVG	94	0.47	8,875	44.60	24	0.12	80	0.40	23	0.12	10,441	52.47	233	1.17	15	0.08	79	0.40	13	0.07	22	0.11	437	2.15	20,336	19,899	30,063	67.64
Matobo	MBS	107	0.74	6,244	43.27	94	0.65	91	0.63	27	0.19	6,980	48.37	435	3.01	82	0.57	273	1.89	42	0.29	55	0.38	384	2.59	14,814	14,430	25,010	59.23
Matobo Mangwe	MBS	144	1.06	6,763	49.94	124	0.92	127	0.94	49	0.36	5,179	38.24	597	4.41	85	0.63	355	2.62	45	0.33	74	0.55	392	2.81	13,934	13,542	24,133	57.74
Mazowe Central	MSC	148	0.50	7,650	25.82	56	0.19	93	0.31	43	0.15	20,984	70.83	338	1.14	35	0.12	203	0.69	21	0.07	54	0.18	580	1.92	30,205	29,625	39,268	76.92
Mazowe North	MSC	129	0.48	5,504	20.68	44	0.17	54	0.20	25	0.09	20,532	77.13	172	0.65	24	0.09	99	0.37	15	0.06	21	0.08	558	2.05	27,177	26,619	34,328	79.17
Mazowe South	MSC	85	0.37	7,139	31.46	40	0.18	49	0.22	29	0.13	15,029	66.22	177	0.78	18	0.08	84	0.37	25	0.11	20	0.09	437	1.89	23,132	22,695	30,059	76.96
Mazowe West	MSC	141	0.45	5,727	18.45	40	0.13	69	0.22	33	0.11	24,657	79.44	179	0.58	38	0.12	102	0.33	20	0.06	33	0.11	846	2.65	31,885	31,039	41,155	77.48
Mbare	HRE	87	0.26	18,343	54.72	42	0.13	37	0.11	23	0.07	14,462	43.14	313	0.93	20	0.06	151	0.45	28	0.08	18	0.05	691	2.02	34,215	33,524	45,872	74.59
Mberengwa Central	MID	140	0.65	4,019	18.72	42	0.20	107	0.50	21	0.10	16,762	78.06	192	0.89	51	0.24	99	0.46	19	0.09	21	0.10	532	2.42	22,005	21,473	30,936	71.13
Mberengwa East	MID	170	0.84	5,943	29.50	61	0.30	97	0.48	28	0.14	13,261	65.82	310	1.54	55	0.27	142	0.70	30	0.15	50	0.25	404	1.97	20,551	20,147	30,561	67.25
Mberengwa West	MID	160	0.84	4,623	24.24	59	0.31	118	0.62	28	0.15	13,451	70.52	291	1.53	64	0.34	205	1.07	16	0.08	58	0.30	670	3.39	19,743	19,073	28,228	69.94
Mbire	MSC	253	0.96	7,037	26.59	104	0.39	113	0.43	45	0.17	17,928	67.74	541	2.04	53	0.20	281	1.06	30	0.11	80	0.30	827	3.03	27,292	26,465	36,514	74.74
Mbizo	MID	41	0.17	17,305	73.12	22	0.09	23	0.10	7	0.03	5,944	25.12	180	0.76	9	0.04	102	0.43	23	0.10	11	0.05	331	1.38	23,998	23,667	35,438	67.72
Mhangura	MSW	124	0.38	3,805	11.69	55	0.17	122	0.37	29	0.09	27,987	85.99	206	0.63	35	0.11	126	0.39	25	0.08	32	0.10	764	2.29	33,310	32,546	42,855	77.73
Mhondoro-Mubaira	MSW	136	0.60	8,721	38.16	81	0.35	117	0.51	25	0.11	13,101	57.32	402	1.76	43	0.19	21	0.09	28	0.12	181	0.79	601	2.56	23,457	22,856	33,950	69.09
Mhondoro-Ngezi	MSW	141	0.51	11,305	40.74	67	0.24	78	0.28	16	0.06	15,589	56.18	291	1.05	45	0.16	165	0.59	23	0.08	26	0.09	467	1.66	28,213	27,746	39,268	71.85
Mkoba North	MID	22	0.12	13,439	76.10	20	0.11	27	0.15	6	0.03	3,872	21.93	164	0.93	6	0.03	47	0.27	52	0.29	5	0.03	222	1.24	17,882	17,660	28,922	61.83
Mkoba South	MID	26	0.14	14,514	78.22	29	0.16	17	0.09	6	0.03	3,657	19.71	167	0.90	16	0.09	69	0.37	45	0.24	10	0.05	164	0.88	18,720	18,556	30,663	61.05
Mount Pleasant	HRE	43	0.16	18,156	68.59	19	0.07	22	0.08	36	0.14	7,920	29.92	105	0.40	9	0.03	34	0.13	117	0.44	8	0.03	305	1.14	26,774	26,469	39,427	67.91
Mpopoma-Mzilikazi	BYO	37	0.25	11,651	79.79	16	0.11	12	0.08	11	0.08	2,541	17.40	176	1.21	16	0.11	86	0.59	38	0.26	18	0.12	188	1.27	14,790	14,602	23,650	62.54
Mount Darwin East	MSC	145	0.61	3,382	14.32	44	0.19	71	0.30	31	0.13	19,406	82.15	269	1.14	37	0.16	158	0.67	23	0.10	57	0.24	556	2.30	24,179	23,623	31,057	77.85
Mount Darwin North	MSC	94	0.47	2,339	11.59	43	0.21	104	0.52	29	0.14	17,175	85.13	187	0.93	25	0.12	124	0.61	14	0.07	41	0.20	555	2.68	20,730	20,175	27,966	74.13
Mount Darwin South	MSC	99	0.38	5,835	22.32	61	0.23	88	0.34	21	0.08	19,535	74.72	274	1.05	47	0.18	121	0.46	25	0.10	38	0.15	520	1.95	26,664	26,144	34,518	77.25
Mount Darwin West	MSC	81	0.34	2,911	12.20	27	0.11	51	0.21	16	0.07	20,486	85.83	135	0.57	31	0.13	84	0.35	18	0.08	28	0.12	317	1.31	24,185	23,868	30,638	78.94
Mudzi North	MSE	53	0.30	3,657	20.40	54	0.30	30	0.17	14	0.08	13,797	76.97	159	0.89	28	0.16	102	0.57	11	0.06	21	0.12	399	2.18	18,325	17,926	24,711	74.16
Mudzi South	MSE	74	0.32	2,502	10.87	42	0.18	35	0.15	25	0.11	19,946	86.67	194	0.84	35	0.15	105	0.46	16	0.07	41	0.18	787	3.31	23,802	23,015	29,426	80.89
Mudzi West	MSE	53	0.26	2,085	10.36	34	0.17	28	0.14	13	0.06	17,656	87.77	129	0.64	21	0.10	74	0.37	5	0.02	19	0.09	460	2.24	20,577	20,117	26,573	77.44
Murewa North	MSE	123	0.52	8,380	35.37	58	0.24	44	0.19	31	0.13	14,490	61.16	309	1.30	41	0.17	147	0.62	27	0.11	42	0.18	437	1.81	24,129	23,692	35,321	68.31
Murewa South	MSE	57	0.25	4,519	19.97	42	0.19	43	0.19	22	0.10	17,613	77.82	190	0.84	25	0.11	88	0.39	17	0.08	18	0.08	398	1.73	23,032	22,634	32,236	71.45
Murewa West	MSE	80	0.32	8,485	34.00	71	0.28	64	0.26	23	0.09	15,684	62.85	334	1.34	52	0.21	114	0.46	11	0.04	38	0.15	714	2.78	25,670	24,956	37,680	68.13
Mutare Central	MCL	19	0.09	15,052	73.04	23	0.11	8	0.04	14	0.07	5,196	25.21	178	0.86	12	0.06	67	0.33	29	0.14	11	0.05	229	1.10	20,838	20,609	31,086	67.03
Mutare North	MCL	128	0.54	7,514	31.51	85	0.36	85	0.36	28	0.12	15,442	64.75	306	1.28	43	0.18	163	0.68	18	0.08	38	0.16	502	2.06	24,352	23,850	34,356	70.88
Mutare South	MCL	127	0.55	10,590	45.77	74	0.32	92	0.40	37	0.16	11,589	50.09	345	1.49	50	0.22	150	0.65	29	0.13	53	0.23	565	2.38	23,701	23,136	36,409	65.10
Mutare West	MCL	119	0.52	7,274	31.59	69	0.30	99	0.43	28	0.12	14,830	64.41	323	1.40	39	0.17	195	0.85	17	0.07	32	0.14	534	2.27	23,559	23,025	34,996	67.32
Mutasa Central	MCL	82	0.35	10,335	44.16	34	0.15	49	0.21	15	0.06	12,391	52.94	330	1.41	25	0.11	98	0.42	14	0.06	32	0.14	395	1.66	23,800	23,405	32,375	73.51
Mutasa North	MCL	128	0.54	9,855	41.38	65	0.27	85	0.36	21	0.09	12,972	54.47	457	1.92	31	0.13	161	0.68	10	0.04	32	0.13	539	2.21	24,356	23,817	33,765	72.13
Mutasa South	MCL	34	0.15	11,627	52.97	28	0.13	21	0.10	9	0.04	9,998	45.54	122	0.56	15	0.07	66	0.30	27	0.12	5	0.02	311	1.40	22,263	21,952	32,920	67.63
Mutema-Musikavanhu	MCL	116	0.45	12,084	47.12	92	0.36	98	0.38	133	0.52	12,142	47.35	552	2.15	55	0.21	254	0.99	54	0.21	64	0.25	590	2.25	26,234	25,644	38,639	67.90
Mutoko East	MSE	32	0.14	3,634	16.06	29	0.13	42	0.19	10	0.04	18,592	82.16	141	0.62	40	0.18	82	0.36	3	0.01	25	0.11	355	1.54	22,985	22,630	29,171	78.79
Mutoko North	MSE	54	0.27	4,736	23.59	21	0.10	40	0.20	17	0.08	14,822	73.83	213	1.06	41	0.20	107	0.53	12	0.06	13	0.06	493	2.40	20,569	20,076	27,127	75.82
Mutoko South	MSE	34	0.16	4,934	22.70	18	0.08	28	0.13	10	0.05	16,464	75.75	132	0.61	25	0.12	59	0.27	6	0.03	24	0.11	370	1.67	22,104	21,734	29,043	76.11
Muzarabani North	MSC	42	0.18	1,446	6.29	21	0.09	41	0.18	12	0.05	21,266	92.51	82	0.36	12	0.05	37	0.16	5	0.02	24	0.10	332	1.42	23,320	22,988	29,178	79.92
Muzarabani South	MSC	86	0.35	2,506	10.26	18	0.07	65	0.27	15	0.06	21,517	88.13	85	0.35	20	0.08	59	0.24	10	0.04	33	0.14	390	1.57	24,804	24,414	30,506	81.31
Muzvezve	MSW	107	0.46	7,637	33.03	35	0.15	58	0.25	16	0.07	14,919	64.53	167	0.72	31	0.13	99	0.43	29	0.13	20	0.09	506	2.14	23,624	23,118	34,641	68.20
Mwenezi East	MVG	91	0.48	2,296	12.04	26	0.14	97	0.51	25	0.13	16,317	85.54	93	0.49	33	0.17	50	0.26	21	0.11	27	0.14	423	2.17	19,499	19,076	26,982	72.27
Mwenezi North	MVG	120	0.70	3,533	20.47	44	0.25	58	0.34	19	0.11	13,083	75.80	190	1.10	31	0.18	118	0.68	26	0.15	38	0.22	412	2.33	17,672	17,260	24,977	70.75
Mwenezi West	MVG	161	0.73	1,607	7.33	85	0.39	142	0.65	30	0.14	19,547	89.17	129	0.59	65	0.30	91	0.42	30	0.14	35	0.16	592	2.63	22,514	21,922	31,619	71.20
Nkayi North	MBN	120	0.90	4,929	36.95	97	0.73	78	0.58	38	0.28	6,372	47.77	379	2.84	92	0.69	1,086	8.14	87	0.65	61	0.46	387	2.82	13,726	13,339	24,350	56.37
Nkayi South	MBN	112	0.95	5,931	50.29	83	0.70	89	0.75	27	0.23	4,623	39.20	403	3.42	65	0.55	366	3.10	45	0.38	49	0.42	442	3.61	12,235	11,793	23,652	51.73
Nketa	BYO	25	0.17	11,361	78.18	22	0.15	12	0.08	14	0.10	2,768	19.05	119	0.82	28	0.19	75	0.52	82	0.56	26	0.18	184	1.25	14,716	14,532	23,998	61.32
Nkulumane	BYO	47	0.36	10,222	77.52	33	0.25	32	0.24	10	0.08	2,470	18.73	121	0.92	22	0.17	101	0.77	103	0.78	26	0.20	165	1.24	13,352	13,187	22,682	58.87
Norton	MSW	59	0.23	18,076	70.74	43	0.17	29	0.11	30	0.12	7,010	27.44	133	0.52	12	0.05	86	0.34	50	0.20	23	0.09	276	1.07	25,827	25,551	36,164	71.42
Nyanga North	MCL	95	0.42	7,548	33.71	78	0.35	60	0.27	25	0.11	13,679	61.10	463	2.07	47	0.21	308	1.38	32	0.14	53	0.24	538	2.35	22,926	22,388	33,100	69.26
Nyanga South	MCL	69	0.34	9,710	47.47	46	0.22	42	0.21	19	0.09	9,915	48.47	333	1.63	36	0.18	183	0.89	73	0.36	30	0.15	429	2.05	20,885	20,456	30,929	67.53
Pelandaba-Tshabalala	BYO	36	0.26	10,761	77.78	25	0.18	20	0.14	11	0.08	2,687	19.42	123	0.89	12	0.09	76	0.55	47	0.34	38	0.27	195	1.39	14,031	13,836	22,817	61.49
Pumula	BYO	32	0.24	10,236	77.74	31	0.24	28	0.21	11	0.08	2,520	19.14	109	0.83	29	0.22	92	0.70	68	0.52	11	0.08	134	1.01	13,301	13,167	23,193	57.35
Redcliff	MID	60	0.26	11,374	49.89	47	0.21	61	0.27	13	0.06	10,763	47.21	234	1.03	26	0.11	158	0.69	42	0.18	18	0.08	458	1.97	23,254	22,796	34,445	67.51
Rushinga	MSC	86	0.30	4,526	15.71	48	0.17	60	0.21	23	0.08	23,550	81.76	262	0.91	53	0.18	157	0.55	7	0.02	33	0.11	428	1.46	29,233	28,805	37,052	78.90
Ruwa	MSE	22	0.08	18,862	71.73	11	0.04	10	0.04	14	0.05	7,171	27.27	126	0.48	6	0.02	36	0.14	34	0.13	4	0.02	321	1.21	26,617	26,296	37,228	71.50
Sanyati	MSW	113	0.50	5,772	25.45	71	0.31	100	0.44	34	0.15	16,115	71.05	190	0.84	54	0.24	171	0.75	36	0.16	26	0.11	577	2.48	23,259	22,682	33,491	69.45
Seke	MSE	75	0.27	14,313	52.12	46	0.17	44	0.16	21	0.08	12,437	45.29	314	1.14	29	0.11	127	0.46	28	0.10	26	0.09	637	2.27	28,097	27,460	39,617	70.92
Shamva North	MSC	119	0.40	4,265	14.41	44	0.15	91	0.31	20	0.07	24,617	83.18	197	0.67	35	0.12	152	0.51	24	0.08	32	0.11	583	1.93	30,179	29,596	37,255	81.01
Shamva South	MSC	96	0.28	4,394	12.86	30	0.09	49	0.14	17	0.05	29,374	85.99	94	0.28	18	0.05	55	0.16	11	0.03	23	0.07	548	1.58	34,709	34,161	41,738	83.16
Shurugwi North	MID	81	0.35	9,219	40.17	33	0.14	53	0.23	20	0.09	13,162	57.35	218	0.95	20	0.09	96	0.42	20	0.09	28	0.12	472	2.02	23,422	22,950	34,939	67.04
Shurugwi South	MID	99	0.59	5,136	30.60	36	0.21	76	0.45	21	0.13	10,973	65.38	226	1.35	27	0.16	132	0.79	18	0.11	39	0.23	392	2.28	17,175	16,783	25,366	67.71
Silobela	MID	128	0.63	7,178	35.50	80	0.40	88	0.44	25	0.12	11,959	59.15	340	1.68	53	0.26	289	1.43	29	0.14	50	0.25	875	4.15	21,094	20,219	31,347	67.29
Southerton	HRE	26	0.12	16,361	78.39	23	0.11	24	0.11	18	0.09	4,147	19.87	144	0.69	11	0.05	69	0.33	42	0.20	6	0.03	294	1.39	21,165	20,871	30,698	68.95
St Mary's	HRE	42	0.17	17,498	71.70	24	0.10	21	0.09	18	0.07	6,525	26.74	157	0.64	13	0.05	72	0.30	29	0.12	6	0.02	288	1.17	24,693	24,405	34,268	72.06
Sunningdale	HRE	22	0.10	16,821	74.17	12	0.05	13	0.06	19	0.08	5,576	24.59	87	0.38	7	0.03	38	0.17	77	0.34	6	0.03	184	0.80	22,862	22,678	33,518	68.21
Tsholotsho North	MBN	124	0.85	7,321	50.44	92	0.63	100	0.69	44	0.30	6,010	41.41	376	2.59	72	0.50	214	1.47	93	0.64	67	0.46	486	3.24	14,999	14,513	26,094	57.48
Tsholotsho South	MBN	142	0.87	7,362	45.14	114	0.70	139	0.85	43	0.26	7,643	46.86	374	2.29	91	0.56	221	1.35	112	0.69	69	0.42	472	2.81	16,782	16,310	29,457	56.97
Umguza	MBN	98	0.48	8,258	40.73	39	0.19	75	0.37	23	0.11	10,994	54.22	416	2.05	46	0.23	196	0.97	100	0.49	31	0.15	466	2.25	20,742	20,276	32,810	63.22
Umzingwane	MBS	118	0.81	6,816	46.74	63	0.43	54	0.37	19	0.13	6,935	47.55	287	1.97	37	0.25	204	1.40	17	0.12	34	0.23	369	2.47	14,953	14,584	24,218	61.74
Uzumba	MSE	63	0.24	1,965	7.39	25	0.09	33	0.12	12	0.05	24,224	91.16	144	0.54	25	0.09	54	0.20	6	0.02	23	0.09	268	1.00	26,842	26,574	33,934	79.10
Vungu	MID	130	0.77	6,028	35.85	65	0.39	96	0.57	37	0.22	9,786	58.20	285	1.70	60	0.36	250	1.49	33	0.20	44	0.26	468	2.71	17,282	16,814	28,415	60.82
Warren Park	HRE	23	0.11	17,336	81.52	16	0.08	15	0.07	19	0.09	3,605	16.95	124	0.58	9	0.04	71	0.33	38	0.18	10	0.05	220	1.02	21,486	21,266	34,908	61.55
Wedza North	MSE	76	0.30	6,634	26.43	51	0.20	62	0.25	16	0.06	17,814	70.98	249	0.99	41	0.16	107	0.43	19	0.08	29	0.12	691	2.68	25,789	25,098	35,563	72.52
Wedza South	MSE	74	0.40	6,238	34.13	35	0.19	71	0.39	21	0.11	11,309	61.88	326	1.78	32	0.18	121	0.66	10	0.05	38	0.21	520	2.77	18,795	18,275	27,085	69.39
Zaka Central	MVG	105	0.51	7,090	34.76	38	0.19	134	0.66	19	0.09	12,458	61.07	352	1.73	26	0.13	128	0.63	19	0.09	29	0.14	587	2.80	20,985	20,398	31,211	67.24
Zaka North	MVG	167	0.85	6,606	33.74	77	0.39	102	0.52	21	0.11	12,037	61.49	300	1.53	38	0.19	147	0.75	30	0.15	52	0.27	645	3.19	20,222	19,577	30,169	67.03
Zaka South	MVG	154	0.79	5,847	29.92	70	0.36	144	0.74	24	0.12	12,739	65.18	301	1.54	44	0.23	142	0.73	22	0.11	58	0.30	658	3.26	20,203	19,545	29,433	68.64
Zengeza East	HRE	39	0.17	16,669	70.89	21	0.09	26	0.11	18	0.08	6,451	27.43	145	0.62	9	0.04	81	0.34	41	0.17	14	0.06	304	1.28	23,818	23,514	34,800	68.44
Zengeza West	HRE	41	0.17	18,319	74.43	23	0.09	23	0.09	17	0.07	5,876	23.87	154	0.63	24	0.10	92	0.37	35	0.14	10	0.04	309	1.24	24,923	24,614	35,745	69.72
Zhombe	MID	182	0.85	6,440	30.10	74	0.35	105	0.49	31	0.14	13,849	64.73	331	1.55	46	0.21	267	1.25	23	0.11	48	0.22	689	3.12	22,085	21,396	31,585	69.92
Zvimba East	MSW	84	0.27	16,066	52.41	40	0.13	51	0.17	20	0.07	13,855	45.19	256	0.84	39	0.13	148	0.48	71	0.23	27	0.09	644	2.06	31,301	30,657	42,539	73.58
Zvimba North	MSW	157	0.60	5,135	19.65	54	0.21	82	0.31	25	0.10	20,283	77.62	197	0.75	38	0.15	93	0.36	27	0.10	40	0.15	784	2.91	26,915	26,131	36,220	74.31
Zvimba South	MSW	140	0.62	5,906	26.09	60	0.27	79	0.35	29	0.13	15,933	70.39	238	1.05	49	0.22	150	0.66	30	0.13	21	0.09	597	2.57	23,232	22,635	32,976	70.45
Zvimba West	MSW	142	0.73	9,422	48.31	80	0.41	71	0.36	30	0.15	8,900	45.63	420	2.15	63	0.32	259	1.33	67	0.34	49	0.25	446	2.24	19,949	19,503	30,326	65.78
Zvishavane-Ngezi	MID	69	0.29	13,386	55.70	31	0.13	32	0.13	12	0.05	10,128	42.14	218	0.91	18	0.07	103	0.43	21	0.09	15	0.06	430	1.76	24,463	24,033	35,001	69.89
Zvishavane-Runde	MID	146	0.65	8,189	36.40	56	0.25	80	0.36	18	0.08	13,516	60.08	265	1.18	21	0.09	140	0.62	18	0.08	46	0.20	583	2.53	23,078	22,495	32,749	70.47
Total		18,816	0.42	1,967,343	44.03	10,230	0.23	13,060	0.29	5,323	0.12	2,350,711	52.60	53,517	1.20	7,053	0.16	28,883	0.65	6,989	0.16	6,743	0.15	92,553	2.03	4,561,221	4,468,668	6,623,511	68.86
Total		Votes	%	Votes	%	Votes	%	Votes	%	Votes	%	Votes	%	Votes	%	Votes	%	Votes	%	Votes	%	Votes	%	Votes	%	Total Votes Cast	Total Valid Votes Cast	Voter Population	Voter Turnout %
Total																								Total Votes Rejected		Total Votes Cast	Total Valid Votes Cast	Voter Population	Voter Turnout %
Total		FreeZim Congress		CCC		ZCPD		ZIPP		NCA		ZANU–PF		NPC		UANC		MDC-T		UZA		DOP		Total Votes Rejected		Total Votes Cast	Total Valid Votes Cast	Voter Population	Voter Turnout %
Total		Joseph Makamba Busha		Nelson Chamisa		Tapiwa Trust Chikohora		Blessing Kasiyamhuru		Lovemore Madhuku		Emmerson Mnangagwa		Wilbert Mubaiwa		Gwinyai Henry Muzorewa		Douglas Mwonzora		Elisabeth Valerio		Harry Peter Wilson		Total Votes Rejected		Total Votes Cast	Total Valid Votes Cast	Voter Population	Voter Turnout %

== National Assembly ==
=== Summary ===
House of Assembly election results by constituency ZANU-PF CCC

Party	Votes	%	Seats				
Party	Votes	%	Common	Women	Youth	Total	+/–
ZANU–PF	2,515,607	56.18	137	33	7	177	–2
Citizens Coalition for Change	1,856,393	41.46	73	27	3	103	New
Movement for Democratic Change – Tsvangirai	15,307	0.34	0	0	0	0	–88
Zimbabwe African People's Union	10,857	0.24	0	0	0	0	0
United Zimbabwe Alliance	4,937	0.11	0	0	0	0	New
National Constitutional Assembly	2,462	0.05	0	0	0	0	0
Democratic Opposition Party	2,105	0.05	0	0	0	0	New
FreeZim Congress	1,926	0.04	0	0	0	0	0
Democratic Union of Zimbabwe	1,881	0.04	0	0	0	0	0
Mthwakazi Republic Party	1,641	0.04	0	0	0	0	0
Zimbabwe National Revival Party	1,271	0.03	0	0	0	0	New
Zimbabwe African National Congress	628	0.01	0	0	0	0	New
United African National Council	574	0.01	0	0	0	0	0
Zimbabwe Coalition for Peace and Development Party	434	0.01	0	0	0	0	New
National People’s Congress	297	0.01	0	0	0	0	New
Economic Freedom Fighters	286	0.01	0	0	0	0	New
United Freedom Party	187	0.00	0	0	0	0	New
Freedom Alliance	148	0.00	0	0	0	0	New
Independents	60,445	1.35	0	0	0	0	–1
Total	4,477,386	100.00	210	60	10	280	+10
Source: Zimbabwe Electoral Commission Zimbabwe Elections

=== Constituency results ===
==== Results by constituency ====
Results by constituency
Constituency	Province	2018 result	2023 winning party				Turnout (Note: Excludes spoilt ballots)	Votes						
Constituency	Province	2018 result	Party	Votes	Share	Majority	Turnout	ZANU	CCC	MDC	NPC	FZC	Other (Note: Includes all other parties and all independent candidates)	Total
Beitbridge East	MBS	ZANU	ZANU	8,635	60.5%	3,009		8,635	5,626					14,261
Beitbridge West	MBS	ZANU	CCC	7,428	46.8%	96		7,332	7,428				1,114	15,874
Bikita East	MVG	ZANU	ZANU	9,880	56.7%	2,336		9,880	7,544					17,424
Bikita South	MVG	ZANU	ZANU	11,396	63.2%	4,774		11,396	6,622					18,018
Bikita West	MVG	ZANU	ZANU	11,614	57.6%	3,839		11,614	7,775				774	20,163
Bindura North	MSC	ZANU	ZANU	16,513	57.4%	4,469		16,513	12,044				236	28,793
Bindura South	MSC	ZANU	ZANU	17,912	66.2%	8,757		17,912	9,155					27,067
Binga North	MBN	MDC-A	CCC	13,530	56.5%	3,867		9,663	13,530	288			463	23,944
Binga South	MBN	MDC-A	CCC	10,967	55.4%	3,709		7,258	10,967				1,567	19,792
Bubi	MBN	ZANU	ZANU	11,208	60.5%	6,536		11,208	4,672	583		150	1,902	18,515
Budiriro North	HRE	(Note: Constituency created as part of the 2023 delimitation)	CCC	18,135	72.2%	13,375		4,760	18,135				2,228	25,123
Budiriro South	HRE		CCC	17,348	81.8%	13,645		3,703	17,348				148	21,199
Buhera Central	MCL	ZANU	ZANU	11,220	68.0%	5,944		11,220	5,276					16,496
Buhera North	MCL	ZANU	ZANU	12,288	64.5%	5,532		12,288	6,756					19,044
Buhera South	MCL	ZANU	ZANU	9,222	53.8%	1,310		9,222	7,912					17,134
Buhera West	MCL	ZANU	ZANU	11,037	60.4%	4,040		11,037	6,997	247				18,281
Bulawayo Central	BYO	MDC-A	CCC	11,066	77.9%	7,926		3,140	11,066					14,206
Bulawayo North	BYO		CCC	10,260	76.1%	7,581		2,679	10,260				538	13,477
Bulawayo South	BYO	ZANU	CCC	10,470	72.8%	6,718		3,752	10,470				160	14,382
Bulilima	MBS		ZANU	7,185	47.0%	525		7,185	6,660				1,442	15,287
Chakari	MSW	ZANU	ZANU	22,145	77.6%	15,750		22,145	6,395					28,540
Chegutu East	MSW	ZANU	ZANU	17,913	72.4%	11,081		17,913	6,832					24,745
Chegutu West	MSW	MDC-A (Note: Although MDC-A officially won the vote count, due to a miscalculation on the day ZANU-PF was declared the winner, and the ZANU-PF member eventually took the seat in Parliament. The case was heard in court as Gift Machoka Konjana v Dexter Nduna.)	CCC	13,942	52.6%	2,634		11,308	13,942				1,267	26,517
Chikanga	MCL		CCC	14,237	78.0%	10,385		3,852	14,237				174	18,263
Chikomba East	MSE	ZANU	ZANU	12,089	65.5%	5,886		12,089	6,203				159	18,451
Chikomba West	MSE	ZANU	ZANU	19,620	71.4%	11,760		19,620	7,860					27,480
Chimanimani East	MCL	ZANU	ZANU	16,823	73.1%	10,630		16,823	6,193					23,016
Chimanimani West	MCL	ZANU	ZANU	16,229	61.8%	6,312		16,229	9,917				111	26,257
Chinhoyi	MSW	MDC-A	CCC	15,761	60.7%	5,710		10,051	15,761				145	25,957
Chipinge Central	MCL	ZANU	ZANU	13,133	54.1%	1,985		13,133	11,148					24,281
Chipinge East	MCL	MDC-A	ZANU	12,186	58.1%	3,604		12,186	8,582				213	20,981
Chipinge South	MCL	ZANU	CCC	11,039	53.3%	2,949		8,090	11,039				1,572	20,701
Chiredzi Central	MVG		CCC	12,342	59.2%	4,510		7,832	12,342				676	20,850
Chiredzi East	MVG	ZANU	ZANU	14,265	78.4%	10,343		14,265	3,922					18,187
Chiredzi North	MVG	ZANU	ZANU	18,696	87.9%	16,112		18,696	2,584					21,280
Chiredzi South	MVG	ZANU	ZANU	11,552	60.5%	4,024		11,552	7,528					19,080
Chiredzi West	MVG	ZANU	ZANU	15,054	69.7%	8,500		15,054	6,554					21,608
Chirumanzu	MID	ZANU	ZANU	10,430	58.8%	3,125		10,430	7,305					17,735
Chirumanzu Zibagwe	MID	ZANU	ZANU	17,787	77.8%	12,711		17,787	5,076					22,863
Chitungwiza North	HRE	MDC-A	CCC	10,393	42.8%	2,190		8,203	15,845 (Note: CCC fielded two candidates, acquiring 10,393 and 5,452 votes respectively)				222	24,270
Chitungwiza South	HRE	MDC-A	CCC	10,145	42.9%	3,482 (Note: CCC fielded two candidates, coming both first and second place. The margin between combined CCC votes and ZANU-PF is 10,199.)		6,609	16,808 (Note: CCC fielded two candidates, acquiring 10,145 and 6,663 votes respectively)				213	23,630
Chivi Central	MVG	ZANU	ZANU	11,710	69.0%	6,455		11,710	5,255					16,965
Chivi North	MVG	ZANU	ZANU	11,769	66.3%	5,864		11,769	5,905				78	17,752
Chivi South	MVG	ZANU	ZANU	12,874	73.6%	8,257		12,874	4,617					17,491
Chiwundura	MID	MDC-A	ZANU	10,890	60.0%	3,624		10,890	7,266					18,156
Churu	HRE		CCC	16,004	49.0%	1,799		14,205	18,443 (Note: CCC fielded two candidates, acquiring 16,004 and 2,439 votes respectively)					32,648
Cowdray Park	BYO		CCC	8,411	56.4%	1,898		6,513	8,411					14,924
Dangamvura	MCL		CCC	17,000	72.1%	10,657		6,343	17,000				221	23,564
Dzivarasekwa	HRE	MDC-A	CCC	16,453	63.4%	7,226		9,227	16,453				259	25,939
Emakhandeni-Luveve	BYO		CCC	9,657	72.2%	6,241		3,416	9,657				304	13,377
Entumbane-Njube	BYO		CCC	8,330	64.8%	5,866		2,464	10,133 (Note: CCC fielded two candidates, acquiring 8,330 and 1,803 votes respectively)				256	12,853
Epworth North	HRE		CCC	14,609	59.6%	5,088		9,521	14,609				376	24,506
Epworth South	HRE		ZANU	8,112	45.7%	1,367		8,112	9,426 (Note: CCC fielded three candidates, acquiring 6,745, 1,367 and 1,314 votes respectively)	228				17,766
Glen Norah	HRE	MDC-A	CCC	17,009	79.2%	12,748		4,261	17,009				214	21,484
Glen View North	HRE	MDC-A	CCC	16,553	77.0%	12,051		4,502	16,553			88	347	21,490
Glen View South	HRE	MDC-A	CCC	15,203	82.0%	12,091		3,112	15,203				216	18,531
Gokwe Central	MID	ZANU	ZANU	12,315	50.8%	998		12,315	11,317				593	24,225
Gokwe Chireya	MID	ZANU	ZANU	10,380	57.7%	8,356		10,380	2,024				5,598	18,002
Gokwe Gumunyu	MID	ZANU	ZANU	12,847	76.5%	8,910		12,847	3,937					16,784
Gokwe Kabuyuni	MID	ZANU	ZANU	14,780	67.9%	7,801		14,780	6,979					21,759
Gokwe Kana	MID	ZANU	ZANU	12,917	70.8%	7,594		12,917	5,323					18,240
Gokwe Mapfungautsi	MID	ZANU	ZANU	13,198	71.8%	8,168		13,198	5,030				162	18,390
Gokwe Nembudziya	MID	ZANU	ZANU	8,730	49.7%	121		8,730	8,609				229	17,568
Gokwe Sengwa	MID	ZANU	ZANU	13,424	79.2%	9,899		13,424	3,525					16,949
Gokwe Sasame	MID	ZANU	ZANU	11,862	57.8%	3,218		11,862	8,644					20,506
Goromonzi North	MSE	ZANU	ZANU	14,546	57.2%	3,665		14,546	10,881					25,427
Goromonzi South	MSE	MDC-A	CCC	16,312	51.1%	1,096		15,216	16,312				421	31,949
Goromonzi West	MSE	ZANU	ZANU	12,072	48.5%	1,380		12,072	10,692				2,139	24,903
Guruve North	MSC	ZANU	ZANU	23,539	86.5%	19,879		23,539	3,660					27,199
Guruve South	MSC	ZANU	ZANU	20,324	81.9%	16,117		20,324	4,207		297			24,828
Gutu Central	MVG	ZANU	ZANU	13,683	60.0%	7,244		13,683	6,439					20,122
Gutu East	MVG	ZANU	ZANU	7,569	44.6%	2,810		7,569	4,759				4,641	16,969
Gutu South	MVG	ZANU	ZANU	9,960	58.3%	2,844		9,960	7,116					17,076
Gutu West (Note: Parliamentary election postponed to 11 November due to candidate dying during general election)	MVG	ZANU	ZANU	12,147	79.30%	10,372	60.2%	12,147	1,258				1,913	15,318
Gwanda North	MBS	ZANU	CCC	7,456	51.4%	405		7,051	7,456					14,507
Gwanda South	MBS	ZANU	ZANU	7,941	58.5%	2,842		7,941	5,099				539	13,579
Gwanda Tshitaudze	MBS		ZANU	8,671	58.7%	2,832		8,671	5,839				271	14,781
Gweru Urban	MID	MDC-A	CCC	12,450	67.1%	7,028		5,422	12,450	672				18,544
Harare Central	HRE	MDC-A	CCC	15,062	63.1%	9,859		5,203	18,651 (Note: CCC fielded two candidates, acquiring 15,062 and 3,589 votes respectively)					23,854
Harare East	HRE	MDC-A	CCC	15,642	63.9%	8,021		7,621	16,669 (Note: CCC fielded two candidates, acquiring 15,642 and 1,027 votes respectively)	108			84	24,482
Harare South	HRE	ZANU	ZANU	13,560	51.1%	6,140 (Note: CCC fielded three candidates, coming second, third and fourth place. The margin between combined CCC votes and ZANU-PF is 558.)		13,560	13,002 (Note: CCC fielded three candidates, acquiring 7,420, 4,009 and 1,573 votes respectively)					26,562
Harare West	HRE	MDC-A	CCC	18,141	78.9%	14,688		3,453	19,536 (Note: CCC fielded two candidates, acquiring 18,141 and 1,395 votes respectively)					22,989
Hatcliffe	HRE		CCC	11,431	48.6%	1,484		9,947	13,367 (Note: CCC fielded two candidates, acquiring 11,431 and 1,936 votes respectively)				215	23,529
Hatfield	HRE	MDC-A	CCC	9,516	40.4%	671 (Note: CCC fielded two candidates, coming both first and second place. The margin between combined CCC votes and ZANU-PF is 13,456.)		4,905	18,361 (Note: CCC fielded two candidates, acquiring 9,516 and 8,845 votes respectively)				288	23,554
Headlands	MCL	ZANU	ZANU	14,931	77.7%	11,173		14,931	3,758				527	19,216
Highfield	HRE		CCC	16,837	80.4%	13,048		3,789	16,837	248		63		20,937
Hunyani	HRE		ZANU	13,249	50.0%	3,014 (Note: CCC fielded two candidates, coming both second and third place. The margin between combined CCC votes and ZANU-PF is 370.)		13,249	12,879 (Note: CCC fielded two candidates, acquiring 10,235 and 2,644 votes respectively)				378	26,506
Hurungwe Central	MSW	ZANU	ZANU	13,116	56.9%	3,641		13,116	9,475			442		23,033
Hurungwe East	MSW	ZANU	ZANU	23,290	87.4%	19,940		23,290	3,350					26,640
Hurungwe North	MSW	ZANU	ZANU	18,524	69.4%	10,361		18,524	8,163					26,687
Hurungwe West	MSW	ZANU	ZANU	13,139	62.9%	5,377		13,139	7,762					20,901
Hwange Central	MBN	MDC-A	CCC	9,167	59.6%	4,010		5,157	9,167	102		74	871	15,371
Hwange East	MBN	MDC-A	CCC	8,931	49.3%	446		8,485	8,931	684				18,100
Hwange West	MBN	MDC-A	CCC	7,954	45.1%	450		7,504	7,954	1,985			186	17,629
Insiza North	MBS	ZANU	ZANU	9,716	66.8%	4,879		9,716	4,837					14,553
Insiza South	MBS	ZANU	ZANU	8,072	52.0%	633		8,072	7,439					15,511
Kadoma Central	MSW	MDC-A	CCC	14,940	63.9%	6,984		7,956	14,940	476				23,372
Kariba	MSW	MDC-A	CCC	11,786	48.5%	771 (Note: CCC fielded two candidates, coming both first and third place. The margin between combined CCC votes and ZANU-PF is 1,629.)		11,015	12,644 (Note: CCC fielded two candidates, acquiring 11,786 and 858 votes respectively)			381	261	24,301
Kuwadzana East	HRE	MDC-A	CCC	18,212	79.4%	14,032		4,180	18,212	312			239	22,943
Kuwadzana West	HRE		CCC	20,043	78.4%	14,792		5,251	20,043				272	25,566
Kwekwe Central	MID	NPF	CCC	10,933	61.7%	4,392		6,541	10,933	113			135	17,722
Lobengula-Magwegwe	BYO		CCC	10,114	70.7%	7,714		2,400	10,114				1,789	14,303
Lupane East	MBN	ZANU	CCC	6,476	47.0%	235		6,241	6,476				1,052	13,769
Lupane West	MBN	ZANU	CCC	8,098	50.0%	994		7,104	8,098	701			280	16,183
Mabvuku-Tafara	HRE	MDC-A	CCC	15,680	56.6%	3,642		12,038	15,680					27,718
Magunje	MSW	ZANU	ZANU	10,121	53.3%	1,699		10,121	8,422				453	18,996
Makonde	MSW	ZANU	ZANU	22,815	78.7%	17,367		22,815	5,448				719	28,982
Makoni Central	MCL	MDC-A	CCC	9,644	48.4%	1,141		8,503	9,644	1,760				19,907
Makoni North	MCL	ZANU	ZANU	12,306	66.3%	6,049		12,306	6,257					18,563
Makoni South	MCL	ZANU	ZANU	13,556	59.5%	5,105		13,556	8,451				768	22,775
Makoni West	MCL	ZANU	ZANU	10,863	62.8%	4,964		10,863	5,899				549	17,311
Mangwe	MBS	ZANU	CCC	7,705	50.9%	1,199		6,506	7,705				914	15,125
Maramba Pfungwe	MSE	ZANU	ZANU	25,757	94.7%	24,309		25,757	1,448					27,205
Marondera Central	MSE	MDC-A	CCC	14,712	56.2%	4,998		9,714	16,475 (Note: CCC fielded two candidates, acquiring 14,712 and 1,763 votes respectively)					26,189
Marondera East	MSE	ZANU	ZANU	15,221	79.9%	11,655		15,221	3,566				262	19,049
Marondera West	MSE	ZANU	ZANU	18,297	60.2%	7,191		18,297	11,106				970	30,373
Masvingo Central	MVG	ZANU	ZANU	9,967	57.6%	2,617		9,967	7,350					17,317
Masvingo North	MVG	ZANU	ZANU	11,694	56.1%	2,547		11,694	9,147					20,841
Masvingo South	MVG	ZANU	ZANU	11,467	69.3%	6,379		11,467	5,088					16,555
Masvingo Urban	MVG	MDC-A	CCC	13,042	60.5%	6,529		6,513	13,042	294			1,715	21,564
Masvingo West	MVG	ZANU	ZANU	10,472	52.5%	1,014		10,472	9,458					19,930
Matobo	MBS		ZANU	7,366	50.6%	1,147		7,366	6,219				976	14,561
Matobo Mangwe	MBS		CCC	6,701	49.2%	1,655		5,046	6,701				1,880	13,627
Mazowe Central	MSC	ZANU	ZANU	21,916	73.7%	14,096		21,916	7,820					29,736
Mazowe North	MSC	ZANU	ZANU	21,840	81.9%	17,009		21,840	4,831					26,671
Mazowe South	MSC	ZANU	ZANU	15,973	70.2%	9,201		15,973	6,772					22,745
Mazowe West	MSC	ZANU	ZANU	25,771	83.0%	20,476		25,771	5,295					31,066
Mbare	HRE	MDC-A	ZANU	17,809	53.0%	2,137		17,809	15,672				119	33,600
Mberengwa Central	MID		ZANU	17,689	82.1%	13,822		17,689	3,867					21,556
Mberengwa East	MID	ZANU	ZANU	14,899	73.9%	9,636		14,899	5,263					20,162
Mberengwa West	MID	ZANU	ZANU	13,795	72.0%	8,980		13,795	4,815			559		19,169
Mbire	MSC	ZANU	ZANU	19,059	72.3%	11,739		19,059	7,320					26,379
Mbizo	MID	MDC-A	CCC	15,946	67.1%	8,445		7,501	15,946	305				23,752
Mhangura	MSW	ZANU	ZANU	29,195	89.7%	25,857		29,195	3,338					32,533
Mhondoro-Mubaira	MSW	ZANU	ZANU	14,019	61.0%	5,303		14,019	8,716				243	22,978
Mhondoro-Ngezi	MSW	ZANU	ZANU	15,980	57.8%	4,792		15,980	11,188				493	27,661
Mkoba North	MID		CCC	12,555	70.9%	7,649		4,906	12,555	124		68	56	17,709
Mkoba South	MID		CCC	14,005	75.4%	9,879		4,126	14,005	306			130	18,567
Mount Darwin East	MSC	ZANU	ZANU	20,731	87.2%	17,683		20,731	3,048					23,779
Mount Darwin North	MSC	ZANU	ZANU	18,460	91.2%	16,688		18,460	1,772					20,232
Mount Darwin South	MSC	ZANU	ZANU	20,153	76.9%	15,391		20,153	4,762				1,294	26,209
Mount Darwin West	MSC	ZANU	ZANU	21,127	88.5%	18,979		21,127	2,148				599	23,874
Mount Pleasant	HRE	MDC-A	CCC	12,863	49.2%	5,076		7,787	18,373 (Note: CCC fielded two candidates, acquiring 12,863 and 5,510 votes respectively)					26,160
Mpopoma-Mzilikazi	BYO		CCC	10,808	74.5%	8,375		2,433	10,808				1,268	14,509
Mudzi North	MSE	ZANU	ZANU	15,099	84.1%	12,241		15,099	2,858					17,957
Mudzi South	MSE	ZANU	ZANU	20,653	89.7%	18,277		20,653	2,376					23,029
Mudzi West	MSE	ZANU	ZANU	18,513	92.1%	16,930		18,513	1,583					20,096
Murewa North	MSE	ZANU	ZANU	14,870	62.7%	7,655		14,870	7,215				1,647	23,732
Murewa South	MSE	ZANU	ZANU	19,657	87.1%	16,755		19,657	2,902					22,559
Murewa West	MSE	ZANU	ZANU	17,733	70.6%	10,462		17,733	7,271				114	25,118
Mutare Central	MCL	MDC-A	CCC	15,628	75.7%	10,618		5,010	15,628					20,638
Mutare North	MCL	ZANU	ZANU	16,133	67.2%	8,255		16,133	7,878					24,011
Mutare South	MCL	ZANU	ZANU	12,886	55.4%	2,524		12,886	10,362					23,248
Mutare West	MCL	ZANU	ZANU	14,641	63.3%	7,118		14,641	7,523				959	23,123
Mutasa Central	MCL	MDC-A	ZANU	13,717	58.4%	3,936		13,717	9,781					23,498
Mutasa North	MCL	ZANU	ZANU	14,085	58.7%	4,173		14,085	9,912					23,997
Mutasa South	MCL	MDC-A	ZANU	11,608	52.8%	1,225		11,608	10,383					21,991
Mutema-Musikavanhu	MCL		ZANU	13,717	53.1%	2,242		13,717	11,475				623	25,815
Mutoko East	MSE	ZANU	ZANU	19,073	84.1%	15,460		19,073	3,613					22,686
Mutoko North	MSE	ZANU	ZANU	16,132	80.0%	12,101		16,132	4,031					20,163
Mutoko South	MSE	ZANU	ZANU	17,459	80.3%	13,163		17,459	4,296					21,755
Muzarabani North	MSC	ZANU	ZANU	21,514	93.9%	20,091		21,514	1,423					22,937
Muzarabani South	MSC	ZANU	ZANU	22,526	91.9%	20,542		22,526	1,984					24,510
Muzvezve	MSW	ZANU	ZANU	16,754	72.3%	10,329		16,754	6,425					23,179
Mwenezi East	MVG	ZANU	ZANU	17,232	90.0%	15,322		17,232	1,910					19,142
Mwenezi North	MVG		ZANU	13,945	80.5%	10,672		13,945	3,373					17,318
Mwenezi West	MVG	ZANU	ZANU	14,391	65.6%	7,896		14,391	1,054				6,495	21,940
Nkayi North	MBN	ZANU	ZANU	5,492	40.8%	1,427		5,492	3,110	4,065			804	13,471
Nkayi South	MBN	ZANU	CCC	6,269	52.6%	1,203		5,066	6,845 (Note: CCC fielded two candidates, acquiring 6,269 and 576 votes respectively)					11,911
Nketa	BYO	MDC-A	CCC	10,605	72.9%	8,049		2,556	10,605				1,379	14,540
Nkulumane	BYO	MDC-A	CCC	9,880	75.0%	7,478		2,402	9,880			101	793	13,176
Norton	MSW	Indp	CCC	13,089	51.1%	5,571		5,017	13,089				7,518	25,624
Nyanga North	MCL	ZANU	ZANU	13,166	58.7%	4,626		13,166	8,540	735				22,441
Nyanga South	MCL	ZANU	ZANU	10,327	50.3%	752		10,327	9,575	619				20,521
Pelandaba-Tshabalala	BYO		CCC	6,529	47.6%	2,700 (Note: CCC fielded two candidates, coming both first and second place. The margin between combined CCC votes and ZANU-PF is 7,389.)		2,969	10,358 (Note: CCC fielded two candidates, acquiring 6,529 and 3,829 votes respectively.)				401	13,728
Pumula	BYO	MDC-A	CCC	7,546	57.7%	4,940		2,606	9,895 (Note: CCC fielded two candidates, acquiring 7,546 and 2,349 votes respectively.)				580	13,081
Redcliff	MID	MDC-A	ZANU	12,167	53.3%	1,815		12,167	10,352				316	22,835
Rushinga	MSC	ZANU	ZANU	24,575	85.2%	20,321		24,575	4,254					28,829
Ruwa	MSE		CCC	16,986	64.4%	7,613		9,373	16,986					26,359
Sanyati	MSW	ZANU	ZANU	17,474	76.9%	12,631		17,474	4,843				406	22,723
Seke	MSE	ZANU	CCC	14,032	50.9%	755		13,277	14,032				235	27,544
Shamva North	MSC	ZANU	ZANU	26,320	88.9%	23,022		26,320	3,298					29,618
Shamva South	MSC	ZANU	ZANU	31,068	90.9%	27,962		31,068	3,106					34,174
Shurugwi North	MID	ZANU	ZANU	13,919	60.5%	4,825		13,919	9,094					23,013
Shurugwi South	MID	ZANU	ZANU	12,156	72.3%	7,488		12,156	4,668					16,824
Silobela	MID	ZANU	ZANU	11,674	57.1%	3,891		11,674	7,783				980	20,437
Southerton	HRE	MDC-A	CCC	15,408	73.9%	10,667		4,741	15,408				707	20,856
St Mary's	HRE	MDC-A	CCC	11,094	45.6%	3,366		7,728	16,613 (Note: CCC fielded two candidates, acquiring 11,094 and 5,519 votes respectively.)					24,341
Sunningdale	HRE	MDC-A	CCC	13,360	59.5%	7,124		6,236	16,122 (Note: CCC fielded two candidates, acquiring 13,360 and 2,762 votes respectively.)				97	22,455
Tsholotsho North	MBN	ZANU	CCC	7,571	51.6%	1,773		5,798	7,571				1,312	14,681
Tsholotsho South	MBN	ZANU	ZANU	7,885	47.8%	774		7,885	7,111				1,483	16,479
Umguza	MBN	ZANU	ZANU	11,718	57.8%	3,648		11,718	8,070				490	20,278
Umzingwane	MBS	ZANU	ZANU	7,416	50.6%	184		7,416	7,232					14,648
Uzumba	MSE	ZANU	ZANU	24,588	92.6%	22,611		24,588	1,977					26,565
Vungu	MID	ZANU	ZANU	10,390	61.7%	4,512		10,390	5,878				574	16,842
Warren Park	HRE	MDC-A	CCC	19,609	75.3%	15,617		3,992	21,709 (Note: CCC fielded two candidates, acquiring 19,609 and 2,100 votes respectively.)	189			161	26,051
Wedza North	MSE	ZANU	ZANU	18,762	74.6%	13,051		18,762	5,711				664	25,137
Wedza South	MSE	ZANU	ZANU	12,563	68.3%	6,741		12,563	5,822					18,385
Zaka Central	MVG	ZANU	ZANU	13,309	64.6%	6,031		13,309	7,278					20,587
Zaka North	MVG	ZANU	ZANU	12,620	64.1%	5,541		12,620	7,079					19,699
Zaka South	MVG		ZANU	14,163	71.9%	8,627		14,163	5,536					19,699
Zengeza East	HRE	MDC-A	CCC	14,614	62.1%	6,018		14,614	8,596				320	23,530
Zengeza West	HRE	MDC-A	CCC	17,835	72.3%	10,991		6,844	17,835					24,679
Zhombe	MID	ZANU	ZANU	14,055	65.3%	6,573		14,055	7,482					21,537
Zvimba East	MSW	ZANU	CCC	15,435	50.3%	189		15,246	15,435					30,681
Zvimba North	MSW	ZANU	ZANU	20,616	79.3%	15,234		20,616	5,382					25,998
Zvimba South	MSW	ZANU	ZANU	15,065	66.5%	11,489		15,065	3,576				4,011	22,652
Zvimba West	MSW	ZANU	ZANU	11,496	58.6%	3,922		11,496	7,574				536	19,606
Zvishavane Ngezi	MID	ZANU	ZANU	12,124	50.4%	517		12,124	11,607	163			165	24,059
Zvishavane Runde	MID	ZANU	ZANU	15,169	67.2%	7,779		15,169	7,390					22,559
Total for all constituencies							Turnout							Total
Total for all constituencies							Turnout	ZANU	CCC	MDC	NPC	FZC	Other	Total
Total for all constituencies							Turnout	Votes						
Total for all constituencies								2,515,607	1,856,393	15,307	297	1,926	87,856	4,477,386
Total for all constituencies								56.18%	41.46%	0.34%	0.01%	0.04%	1.96%	100.0%
Total for all constituencies								Seats						
Total for all constituencies								137	73	0	0	0	0	210
Total for all constituencies								65.2%	34.8%	0%	0%	0%	0%	100.0%

==== Results by province ====
The provincial results below were recorded on election day itself, and do not include the total for the Gutu West constituency. Voting in Gutu West was postponed to 11 November, as a candidate died ahead of election day. As such, it was the results below that were used to determine the proportional representation seats following the general election.

Constituency seat votes and share by Province
Province	Number of seats	ZANU-PF			CCC			MDC		Others		Total
Province	Number of seats	Votes	%	Seats	Votes	%	Seats	Votes	%	Votes	%	Total
Bulawayo	12	37,330	22.4%	0	121,657	73.0%	12	0	0%	7,659	4.5%	166,556
Harare	30	229,162	31.5%	4	489,397	67.3%	26	1,085	0.2%	7,254	1.0%	726,898
Manicaland	26	305,872	55.1%	21	240,123	43.3%	5	3,361	0.6%	5,717	1.0%	555,073
Mashonaland Central	18	389,321	81.3%	18	86,899	18.2%	0	0	0%	2,426	0.5%	478,646
Mashonaland East	23	380,284	68.9%	19	165,216	29.9%	4	0	0%	6,611	1.2%	552,111
Mashonaland West	22	342,255	62.0%	16	192,700	34.9%	6	476	0.1%	16,875	3.1%	552,306
Masvingo	26	303,627	63.6%	23	159,277	33.4%	2	294	0.1%	14,379	3.0%	477,577
Matabeleland North	13	98,579	44.8%	4	102,502	46.6%	9	8,408	3.8%	10,634	4.8%	220,123
Matabeleland South	12	90,937	51.6%	8	78,241	44.4%	4	0	0%	7,136	4.1%	176,314
Midlands	28	326,093	58.6%	23	219,123	39.4%	5	1,683	0.3%	9,565	1.7%	556,464

=== Quota results ===
Results of the Quota seats by Province ZANU-PF CCC

60 seats - 6 per Province - are reserved for women, and 10 seats - 1 per Province - are reserved for youth. These are allocated based on Proportional Representation following the Constituency election results.

Vote share and quota seat allocation by Province
Province	Party	Votes	%	Women Seats /6	Youth Seats /1	Total Seats /7
Bulawayo	ZANU	37,330	22.4	1	-	1
Bulawayo	CCC	121,657	73.0	5	1	6
Harare	ZANU	229,162	31.5	2	-	2
Harare	CCC	489,397	67.3	4	1	5
Manicaland	ZANU	305,872	55.1	3	1	4
Manicaland	CCC	240,123	43.3	3	-	3
Mashonaland Central	ZANU	389,321	81.3	5	1	6
Mashonaland Central	CCC	86,899	18.2	1	-	1
Mashonaland East	ZANU	380,284	68.9	4	1	5
Mashonaland East	CCC	165,216	29.9	2	-	2
Mashonaland West	ZANU	342,255	62.0	4	1	5
Mashonaland West	CCC	192,700	34.9	2	-	2
Masvingo	ZANU	303,627	63.6	4	1	5
Masvingo	CCC	159,277	33.4	2	-	2
Matabeleland North	ZANU	98,579	44.8	3	-	3
Matabeleland North	CCC	102,502	46.6	3	1	4
Matabeleland South	ZANU	90,937	51.6	3	1	4
Matabeleland South	CCC	78,241	44.4	3	-	3
Midlands	ZANU	326,093	58.6	4	1	5
Midlands	CCC	219,123	39.4	2	-	2

== Senate ==
60 seats - 6 per Province - are allocated based on Proportional Representation following the National Assembly Constituency election results. 18 seats are allocated for Chiefs, 2 from each Province, excluding the Metropolitan Provinces of Harare and Bulwayo, as well as the President and Deputy President of the National Council of Chiefs. The remaining two seats are allocated for persons with disabilities, who are voted for by the National Disability Board: one male and one female.

Seat allocation of the Senate ZANU-PF CCC Chiefs Persons with disabilities

Results of the Senate seats by Province ZANU-PF CCC

Vote share and Senate seat allocation by Province
Province	Party	Votes	%	Seats /6	Total Seats /6
Bulawayo	ZANU	37,330	22.4	1	1
Bulawayo	CCC	121,657	73.0	5	5
Harare	ZANU	229,162	31.5	2	2
Harare	CCC	489,397	67.3	4	4
Manicaland	ZANU	305,872	55.1	3	3
Manicaland	CCC	240,123	43.3	3	3
Mashonaland Central	ZANU	389,321	81.3	5	5
Mashonaland Central	CCC	86,899	18.2	1	1
Mashonaland East	ZANU	380,284	68.9	4	4
Mashonaland East	CCC	165,216	29.9	2	2
Mashonaland West	ZANU	342,255	62.0	4	4
Mashonaland West	CCC	192,700	34.9	2	2
Masvingo	ZANU	303,627	63.6	4	4
Masvingo	CCC	159,277	33.4	2	2
Matabeleland North	ZANU	98,579	44.8	3	3
Matabeleland North	CCC	102,502	46.6	3	3
Matabeleland South	ZANU	90,937	51.6	3	3
Matabeleland South	CCC	78,241	44.4	3	3
Midlands	ZANU	326,093	58.6	4	4
Midlands	CCC	219,123	39.4	2	2
