= Constituencies of the Parliament of Zimbabwe =

Zimbabwean parliamentary constituencies
- Constituencies after the 2023 Delimitation Report
- Category: Electoral district
- Location: Zimbabwe
- Created by: Zimbabwe Electoral Commission
- Created: 2023
- Number: 210 (as of 2023)
- Government: National Assembly

The following is a list of parliamentary constituencies in Zimbabwe, broken down by province.

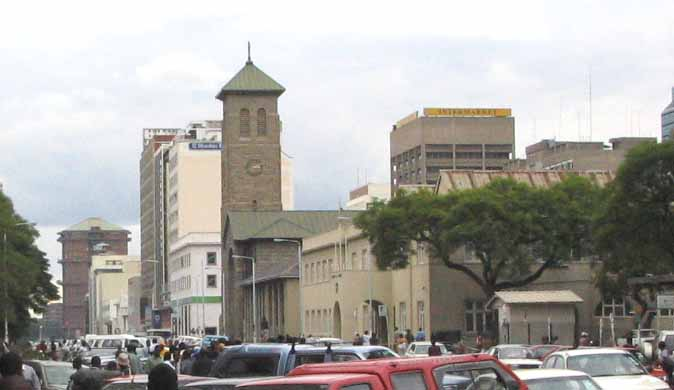
Parliament of Zimbabwe in Harare

The National Assembly, the lower house of the Parliament of Zimbabwe, consists of 270 members. Of these, 210 are elected in single-member constituencies of roughly equal size, with provinces having a varying number of constituencies depending on population. (The remaining 60 seats are elected using proportional representation at the province level, and are reserved for women).

Boundaries were redrawn by the Zimbabwe Electoral Commission for the 2023 general election.

== Bulawayo ==
- Bulawayo Central (1980–1987; since 2008)
- Bulawayo North (since 2023)
- Bulawayo South (1980–1987; since 1990)
- Cowdray Park (since 2023)
- Emakhandeni–Luveve (since 2023)
- Entumbane–Njube (since 2023)
- Lobengula–Magwegwe (since 2023)
- Mpopoma–Mzilikazi (since 2023)
- Nketa
- Nkulumane
- Pelandaba–Tshabalala (since 2023)
- Pumula (since 2008)

=== Former constituencies ===
- Bulawayo East (2005–2023)
- Emakhandeni–Entumbane (2008–2023)
- Lobengula (2008–2023)
- Luveve (until 2023)
- Magwegwe (until 2023)
- Makokoba (1990–2023)
- Pelandaba–Mpopoma (2005–2023)
- Pumula–Luveve (until 2008)

== Harare ==
- Budiriro North (since 2023)
- Budiriro South (since 2023)
- Chitungwiza North
- Chitungwiza South
- Churu (since 2023)
- Epworth North (since 2023)
- Epworth South (since 2023)
- Dzivarasekwa
- Glen Norah
- Glen View North (since 2008)
- Glen View South (since 2008)
- Harare Central
- Harare East
- Harare South
- Harare West
- Hatcliffe (since 2023)
- Hatfield
- Highfield (until 2008; since 2023)
- Hunyani (since 2023)
- Kuwadzana East (since 2008)
- Kuwadzana West (since 2023)
- Mabvuku–Tafara
- Mbare
- Mount Pleasant (1980–1987; since 2008)
- Southerton
- St Mary's
- Sunningdale
- Warren Park
- Zengeza East
- Zengeza West

=== Former constituencies ===
- Budiriro (until 2023)
- Epworth (until 2023)
- Glen View (split into Glen View North and Glen View South in 2008)
- Harare North (1990–2023; reconfigured and renamed as Hatcliffe)
- Highfield East (2008–2023)
- Highfield West (2008–2023)
- Kambuzuma (until 2023)
- Kuwadzana (until 2023)
- Mufakose (until 2023)

== Manicaland ==
=== Current constituencies ===
- Buhera Central
- Buhera North
- Buhera South (since 1985)
- Buhera West
- Chikanga (since 2023)
- Chimanimani East
- Chimanimani West
- Chipinge Central
- Chipinge East
- Chipinge South
- Dangamvura (since 2023)
- Headlands (since 2008)
- Makoni Central (since 2008)
- Makoni North
- Makoni South
- Makoni West
- Mutare Central
- Mutare North
- Mutare South
- Mutare West
- Mutasa Central
- Mutasa North
- Mutasa South
- Mutema–Musikavanhu (since 2023)
- Nyanga North
- Nyanga South

=== Former constituencies ===
- Chipinge West (until 2023)
- Dangamvura–Chikanga (split into Chikanga and Dangamvura in 2023)
- Musikavanhu (merged into Chipinge West in 2023)

== Mashonaland Central ==
- Bindura North
- Bindura South
- Guruve North
- Guruve South
- Mazowe Central
- Mazowe North
- Mazowe South
- Mazowe West
- Mbire
- Mount Darwin East
- Mount Darwin North
- Mount Darwin South
- Mount Darwin West
- Muzarabani North
- Muzarabani South
- Rushinga
- Shamva North
- Shamva South

== Mashonaland East ==
- Chikomba East
- Chikomba West
- Goromonzi North
- Goromonzi South
- Goromonzi West (since 2008)
- Maramba–Pfungwe
- Marondera Central (since 2008)
- Marondera East
- Marondera West
- Mudzi North
- Mudzi South
- Mudzi West
- Murehwa North
- Murehwa South
- Murehwa West
- Mutoko East
- Mutoko North
- Mutoko South
- Ruwa (since 2023)
- Seke
- Uzumba
- Wedza North
- Wedza South

=== Former constituencies ===
- Chikomba Central (until 2023)
- Goromonzi (until 2008)

== Mashonaland West ==
- Chakari
- Chegutu East
- Chegutu West
- Chinhoyi
- Hurungwe Central
- Hurungwe East
- Hurungwe North
- Hurungwe West
- Kadoma Central
- Kariba
- Magunje
- Makonde
- Mhangura
- Mhondoro–Mubaira
- Mhondoro–Ngezi
- Muzvezve
- Norton
- Sanyati
- Zvimba East
- Zvimba North
- Zvimba South
- Zvimba West

== Masvingo ==
- Bikita East
- Bikita South
- Bikita West
- Chiredzi Central (since 2023)
- Chiredzi East
- Chiredzi North
- Chiredzi South
- Chiredzi West
- Chivi Central (since 2008)
- Chivi North (since 2008)
- Chivi South (since 2008)
- Gutu Central
- Gutu East
- Gutu South
- Gutu West
- Masvingo Central
- Masvingo North
- Masvingo South
- Masvingo Urban
- Masvingo West
- Mwenezi East
- Mwenezi North (since 2023)
- Mwenezi West
- Zaka Central
- Zaka North
- Zaka South (since 2023)

=== Former constituencies ===
- Chivi (split into Chivi Central, Chivi North, and Chivi South in 2008)
- Gutu North (until 2023)
- Zaka East (until 2023)
- Zaka West (until 2023)

== Matabeleland North ==
- Binga North (since 2008)
- Binga South (since 2008)
- Bubi
- Lupane East
- Lupane West
- Nkayi South
- Nkayi North
- Tsholotsho North (since 2008)
- Tsholotsho South (since 2008)
- Hwange East
- Hwange Central
- Hwange West
- Umguza

=== Former constituencies ===
- Binga (split into Binga North and Binga South in 2008)
- Tsholotsho (split into Tsholotsho North and Tsholotsho South in 2008)

== Matabeleland South ==
- Beitbridge East
- Beitbridge West
- Bulilima (since 2023)
- Gwanda North
- Gwanda South
- Gwanda–Tshitaudze (since 2023)
- Insiza North
- Insiza South
- Mangwe
- Matobo (since 2023)
- Matobo–Mangwe (since 2023)
- Umzingwane

=== Former constituencies ===
- Bulilima East (merged into Bulilima in 2023)
- Bulilima West (merged into Bulilima in 2023)
- Gwanda Central (reconfigured as Gwanda–Tshitaudze in 2023)
- Matobo North (merged into Matobo in 2023)
- Matobo South (merged into Matobo in 2023)

== Midlands ==
- Chirumanzu
- Chirumanzu–Zibagwe (since 2008)
- Chiwundura
- Gokwe Central
- Gokwe–Chireya
- Gokwe–Gumunyu
- Gokwe–Kabuyuni
- Gokwe–Kana
- Gokwe–Mapfungautsi
- Gokwe–Nembudziya
- Gokwe–Sengwa
- Gokwe–Sasame
- Gweru Urban
- Kwekwe Central
- Mberengwa Central (since 2023)
- Mberengwa East
- Mberengwa West
- Mbizo (since 2008)
- Mkoba North (since 2023)
- Mkoba South (since 2023)
- Redcliff
- Shurugwi North
- Shurugwi South
- Silobela (since 1990)
- Vungu
- Zhombe (since 1990)
- Zvishavane–Ngezi
- Zvishavane–Runde

=== Former constituencies ===
- Kwekwe West (split into Silobela and Zhombe in 1990)
- Mberengwa North (until 2023)
- Mbrerengwa South (until 2023)
- Mkoba (until 2023)

== See also ==
- Elections in Zimbabwe
