= Bulawayo North =

Constituency of the Parliament of Zimbabwe

- National Assembly constituency for the Parliament of Zimbabwe
- District: Bulawayo
- Province: Bulawayo
- Electorate: 22,735 (2023)
- Major settlements: Bulawayo

Current constituency
- Created: 2023
- Number of members: 1
- Party: Citizens Coalition for Change
- Member: Minehle Ntandoyenkosi Gumede
- Created from: Bulawayo Central

Bulawayo North is a constituency of the National Assembly of the Parliament of Zimbabwe located in the city of Bulawayo in eastern Zimbabwe.

== History ==
The constituency was created in 2023.

== Elections ==
In the 2023 Zimbabwean general election, Minehle Ntandoyenkosi Gumede was elected from the Citizens Coalition for Change.

== See also ==
- List of parliamentary constituencies of Zimbabwe
