= Sunningdale (constituency) =

Zimbabwean constituency

- National Assembly constituency for the Parliament of Zimbabwe
- District: Harare
- Province: Harare
- Electorate: 33,518 (2023)

Current constituency
- Number of members: 1
- Party: Citizens Coalition for Change
- Member: Maureen Kademaunga

Sunningdale is a constituency represented in the National Assembly of the Parliament of Zimbabwe. The current MP is Maureen Kademaunga of the Citizens Coalition for Change since the 2023 election.

== Members ==
| Election | Name | Party |
|---|---|---|
| 2013 | Margaret Matienga | MDC–T |
| 2018 | Winnie Kankuni | MDC Alliance |
| 2023 | Maureen Kademaunga | Citizens Coalition for Change |

== See also ==
- List of Zimbabwean parliamentary constituencies
