= Southerton (constituency) =

Zimbabwean constituency

- National Assembly constituency for the Parliament of Zimbabwe
- District: Harare
- Province: Harare
- Electorate: 30,698 (2023)

Current constituency
- Number of members: 1
- Party: Citizens Coalition for Change
- Member: Bridget Nyandoro

Southerton is a constituency represented in the National Assembly of the Parliament of Zimbabwe. The current MP is Bridget Nyandoro of the Citizens Coalition for Change since the 2023 election.

== Members ==
Election	Name	Party
2013	Gift Chimanikire	MDC–T
2018	Peter Moyo	MDC Alliance
2023	Bridget Nyandoro	Citizens Coalition for Change

== See also ==
- List of Zimbabwean parliamentary constituencies
