= Zengeza East =

- National Assembly constituency for the Parliament of Zimbabwe
- District: Chitungwiza
- Province: Harare
- Electorate: 34,800 (2023)
- Major settlements: Zengeza, Chitungwiza

Current constituency
- Created: 2008
- Number of members: 1
- Party: Citizens Coalition for Change
- Member: Goodrich Chimbaira
- Created from: Chitungwiza

Zengeza East is a constituency represented in the National Assembly of the Parliament of Zimbabwe. It covers part of the Zengeza suburb of Chitungwiza, a city in Harare Province. Its current MP since the 2018 election is Goodrich Chimbaira of the Citizens Coalition for Change (previously of the Movement for Democratic Change Alliance).

== History ==
In the 2018 election, Goodrich Chimbaira of the Movement for Democratic Change Alliance was elected MP for Zengeza East. Chimbaira was reelected in the 2023 election, this time representing the newly-formed Citizens Coalition for Change.

== Members ==
Election	Name	Party
2008	Alexio Musundire	MDC–T
2013	Alexio Musundire	MDC–T
2018	Goodrich Chimbaira	MDC Alliance
2023	Goodrich Chimbaira	CCC

== See also ==
- List of Zimbabwean parliamentary constituencies
