= Hatfield (constituency) =

Zimbabwean constituency

- National Assembly constituency for the Parliament of Zimbabwe
- District: Harare
- Province: Harare
- Electorate: 35,752 (2023)
- Major settlements: Hatfield, Harare

Current constituency
- Number of members: 1
- Party: Citizens Coalition for Change
- Member: Rewayi Nyamuronda

Hatfield is a constituency represented in the National Assembly of the Parliament of Zimbabwe. The current MP is Rewayi Nyamuronda of the Citizens Coalition for Change since the 2023 election.

== Members ==
Election	Name	Party
2023	Rewayi Nyamuronda	Citizens Coalition for Change

== See also ==
- List of Zimbabwean parliamentary constituencies
