= Entumbane–Njube =

Constituency of the Parliament of Zimbabwe

- National Assembly constituency for the Parliament of Zimbabwe
- District: Bulawayo
- Province: Bulawayo
- Electorate: 22,150 (2023)

Current constituency
- Created: 2023
- Number of members: 1
- Party: Citizens Coalition for Change
- Member: Prince Dube
- Created from: Emakhandeni–Entumbane and Lobengula

Entumbane–Njube is a constituency of the National Assembly of the Parliament of Zimbabwe located in the city of Bulawayo in eastern Zimbabwe.

== History ==
The constituency was created in 2023.

== Elections ==
In the 2023 Zimbabwean general election, Prince Dube was elected from the Citizens Coalition for Change.

== See also ==
- List of parliamentary constituencies of Zimbabwe
