= Bindura North =

Constituency of the Parliament of Zimbabwe

- Constituency for the National Assembly of Zimbabwe
- Province: Mashonaland Central
- Region: Bindura District

Current constituency
- Number of members: 1
- Party: ZANU–PF
- Member(s): Kenneth Musanhi

Bindura North is a constituency represented in the National Assembly of the Parliament of Zimbabwe, located in Bindura District in Mashonaland Central Province. Its current MP since the 2013 general election is Kenneth Musanhi of ZANU–PF.

== History ==
In the 2023 general election, ZANU–PF incumbent Kenneth Musanhi was reelected against Citizens Coalition for Change candidate Zvidzai Kajokoto.

== Members ==
Election	Name	Party
2013	Kenneth Musanhi	ZANU–PF
2018	Kenneth Musanhi	ZANU–PF
2023	Kenneth Musanhi	ZANU–PF

== See also ==
- List of Zimbabwean parliamentary constituencies
