= Tapiwa Trust Chikohora =

Zimbabwean businessman and politician

Tapiwa Trust Chikohora (born 1 December 1974) is a Zimbabwean businessman who is president of the Zimbabwe chamber of commerce.

== Early life and education ==
Chikohora was born in Chivi District in Masvingo Province. He completed his primary and secondary education in Gweru at Cecil John Rhodes and Fletcher High School respectively before enrolling at the University of South Africa studying accounting. He is a chartered accountant by profession.

== Political career ==
Chikohora was one of the presidential candidates for the Zimbabwe Coalition for Peace and Development Party (ZCPD) in the 2023 Zimbabwean general election, and came in 7th place out of 12 candidates winning 10,230 (0.2%). His party fielded parliamentary candidates in some constituencies, but did not stand across the country due to high fees for nomination. The party promised to introduce "sweeping reforms" and form an "inclusive government" if elected to office.
