= Wilbert Mubaiwa =

Zimbabwean businessman and politician

Wilbert Archibald Mubaiwa is a Zimbabwean businessman and politician.

== Career ==
Mubaiwa is an engineer and banker by profession.

Mubwaia contested Guruve South as an independent candidate in the 2018 Zimbabwean general election. In 2022, he founded the National People's Congress (NPC).

Mubaiwa is a presidential candidate in the 2023 Zimbabwean general election. He is a Pan-Africanist.
