= United African National Council =

- Abbreviation: UANC
- President: Gwinyai Henry Muzorewa
- Founder: Abel Muzorewa
- Founded: 1971
- Headquarters: Harare
- Ideology: Reconciliation; Social liberalism Anti-communism
- Political position: Centre-left
- Alliance: United Parties (1996–2000)
- Colours: Green, yellow, red, black

Party flag

The United African National Council (UANC) is a political party in Zimbabwe. It was briefly the ruling party during 1979–1980, when its leader Abel Muzorewa was prime minister.

== History ==
The party was founded by Muzorewa in 1971. Among those who subsequently joined was Gordon Chavunduka, former president of the National People's Union (NPU), a predominantly black African party that had contested the 1970 Rhodesian general election.

Running as African National Council independents, it won six of the eight African seats in the House of Assembly in the 1974 general elections. The party was renamed the United African National Council in 1977, but did not contest the 1977 general elections.

Following the Internal Settlement of 1978, the party won the 1979 elections, winning 51 of the 100 seats, resulting in Muzorewa becoming prime minister. However, the new government failed to win international recognition due to its exclusion of the African nationalist ZAPU and ZANU in negotiations and following the Lancaster House Agreement, early elections were held in April 1980. The UANC won only three seats as ZANU–PF took power.

After failing to win a seat in the 1985 and 1990 elections, the party joined with other opposition parties to form United Parties to support Muzorewa in the 1996 presidential election, but he subsequently pulled out (albeit with his name remaining on the ballot). United Parties also unsuccessfully contested the 2000 parliamentary elections.

The party contested the 2018 general elections but received just 1,889 votes.

== Electoral history ==
=== Presidential elections ===
Election	Party candidate	Votes	%	Votes	%	Result
Election	Party candidate	First Round		Second Round		Result
1996	Abel Muzorewa	72,600	4.80%	—	—	Lost ✗
2023	Gwinyai Henry Muzorewa	7,358	0.17%	—	—	Lost ✗

=== National Assembly ===
Election	Party leader	Votes	%	Seats	Change	Position	Result
1974	—	1,590	53.36%	6 / 100	New	▲2nd	Opposition
1979	Abel Muzorewa	1,212,639	67.27%	51 / 100	▲51	▲1st	Government
1980	Abel Muzorewa	219,307	8.28%	3 / 100	▼48	▼3rd	Opposition
1985	Abel Muzorewa	64,764	2.24%	0 / 100	▼3	3rd	Extra-parliamentary
1990	Abel Muzorewa	11,191	0.53%	0 / 120	0	▼4th	Extra-parliamentary
2000	Abel Muzorewa	18,606	0.75%	0 / 120	0	▲3rd	Extra-parliamentary
2018	Gwinyai Henry Muzorewa	1,889	0.04%	0 / 270	0	▼18th	Extra-parliamentary
2023	Gwinyai Henry Muzorewa	574	0.01%	0 / 280	0	▲13th	Extra-parliamentary

== See also ==
- List of political parties in Zimbabwe
- Politics of Zimbabwe
