= Elisabeth Valerio =

Zimbabwean businesswoman and politician

Elisabeth Isabel Valerio
- Born: Zimbabwe
- Education: University of California, Los Angeles.
- Occupations: biochemist and conservationist by profession
- Known for: She was the only female candidate for president in the 2023 Zimbabwean general election.
- Political party: Established United Zimbabwe Alliance political party in 2022.
- Mother: Isabel Madangure first woman to contest a presidential election in African history. A descendants of Masvingo's chieftain Mugabe.

Elisabeth Isabel Valerio is a Zimbabwean businesswoman and politician who is leader of the United Zimbabwe Alliance (UZA). She was the only female candidate for president in the 2023 Zimbabwean general election.

== Early life and education ==
Elisabeth Valerio was born in Masvingo, Zimbabwe. She grew up in Hwange in Matabeleland North Province. She spent most of her childhood in the mid-1970s in her parents’ grocery store at Machipisa Shopping Center in Highfield.

Valerio attended University of California, Los Angeles.

== Career ==
Valerio is a biochemist and conservationist by profession. She began her career as a biochemist then moved to Hwange, where she became an environmentalist. In 2020, Elisabeth was led a national appeal to Emmerson Mnangagwa to stop coal mining in the Hwange National Park and any other park reserve, the Zimbabwe’s cabinet then announced that no mining would occur within any national park in Zimbabwe. She is the founding Chairperson for the Association for Tourism Hwange.

In 2022, Elisabeth founded of the Entrepreneurial & Leadership Initiative for Sustainability in Africa (ELISA). Elisabeth Valerio established United Zimbabwe Alliance political party in 2022. The party was launched on 16 March 2022 at the Andy Millar Hall in Harare, Zimbabwe.

Valerio became an official candidate in the 2023 Zimbabwean general election after winning an appeal barring her participation. In the election she came ninth out of eleven candidates.

== Personal life ==
Valerio's mother Isabel Madangure was the first woman to contest a presidential election in African history. They are descendants of Masvingo's chieftain Mugabe.
