= Mutare Central =

Constituency of Zimbabwe

- Constituency for the National Assembly of Zimbabwe
- Province: Manicaland
- Region: Mutare

Current constituency
- Created: 1990; reestablished 2000
- Seats: 1
- Party: Citizens Coalition for Change
- Member: Brian James

Mutare Central is a constituency represented in the National Assembly of the Parliament of Zimbabwe, located in Mutare in Manicaland Province. Its current MP since the 2023 general election is Brian James of the Citizens Coalition for Change, the former mayor of Mutare. The constituency was previously represented between 2000 and 2023 by Innocent Gonese.

== Members ==
Election	Name	Party
Mutare Urban
1985	Edgar Tekere	ZANU–PF
Mutare Central
1990	Daniel Sithole	ZANU–PF
Constituency abolished 1995–2000
2000	Innocent Gonese	MDC
2005	Innocent Gonese	MDC
2008	Innocent Gonese	MDC–T
2013	Innocent Gonese	MDC–T
2018	Innocent Gonese	MDC Alliance
2023	Brian James	CCC

== Electoral history ==
In the 2008 parliamentary election the seat was won by the MDC candidate loyal to Morgan Tsvangirai. The ZANU–PF candidate came second followed by the MDC candidate loyal to Arthur Mutambara.

General Election 2008: Mutare Central
Party	Candidate	Votes	%	±%
ZANU–PF	Munowenyu Brian Garikai Trinity	2322	22.36	
MDC–T	Gonese Innocent Tinashe	7284	70.15	
MDC (Mutambara)	Rusanga Gift	639	6.15	
Majority		4962	47.79	
Turnout		10383		

Other candidates polled a total of 138 votes (1.34%)

== See also ==
- List of Zimbabwean parliamentary constituencies
