= Mutare South =

- Constituency for the National Assembly of Zimbabwe
- Province: Manicaland
- Region: Mutare District

Current constituency
- Number of members: 1
- Party: ZANU–PF
- Member(s): Tawanda Dumbarimwe

Mutare South is a constituency represented in the National Assembly of the Parliament of Zimbabwe, located in Manicaland Province. Its current MP since the 2023 election is Tawanda Dumbarimwe of ZANU–PF.

== History ==
In the 2018 election, Jeffrey Ngome of ZANU–PF was elected to represent the constituency.

== See also ==
- List of Zimbabwean parliamentary constituencies
