= Mount Darwin North =

Constituency of the Parliament of Zimbabwe

- Constituency for the National Assembly of Zimbabwe
- Province: Mashonaland Central
- Region: Mount Darwin District

Current constituency
- Seats: 1
- Party: ZANU–PF
- Member(s): Labbany Munemo

Mount Darwin North is a constituency represented in the National Assembly of the Parliament of Zimbabwe. Its current MP since the 2023 general election is Labbany Munemo of ZANU–PF.

== History ==
In the 2013 general election, Noveti Muponora of ZANU–PF was elected to represent the constituency. Muponora was reelected in 2018.

== Members ==
Election	Name	Party
2000	Joice Mujuru	ZANU–PF
2005	Joice Mujuru	ZANU–PF
2008	Dickson Mafios	ZANU–PF
2013	Noveti Muponora	ZANU–PF
2018	Noveti Muponora	ZANU–PF
2023	Labbany Munemo	ZANU–PF

== See also ==
- List of Zimbabwean parliamentary constituencies
