= Mbare (constituency) =

Constituency of the Parliament of Zimbabwe

- National Assembly constituency for the Parliament of Zimbabwe
- District: Harare
- Province: Harare
- Electorate: 45,872 (2023)
- Major settlements: Mbare

Current constituency
- Number of members: 1
- Party: ZANU–PF
- Member: Martin Matinyanya

Mbare is a constituency represented in the National Assembly of the Parliament of Zimbabwe, located in Harare. Its current MP since the 2023 election is Martin Matinyanya of ZANU–PF.

== History ==
The constituency is based on the southern Harare suburb of Mbare. It is one of the most politically volatile areas in Harare with a high degree of political intolerance and the persecution of perceived opponents of ZANU–PF.

== Members ==
| Election | Name | Party |
|---|---|---|
| 1985 | Edward Pswarayi | ZANU–PF |
Constituency abolished 1990–2005
| 2005 | Gift Chimanikire | MDC |
| 2008 | Piniel Denga | MDC–T |
| 2013 | Tendai Savanhu | ZANU–PF |
| 2018 | Starman Chamisa | CCC |
| 2023 | Martin Matinyanya | ZANU–PF |

== See also ==
- List of Zimbabwean parliamentary constituencies
