= Gwinyai Henry Muzorewa =

Zimbabwean politician

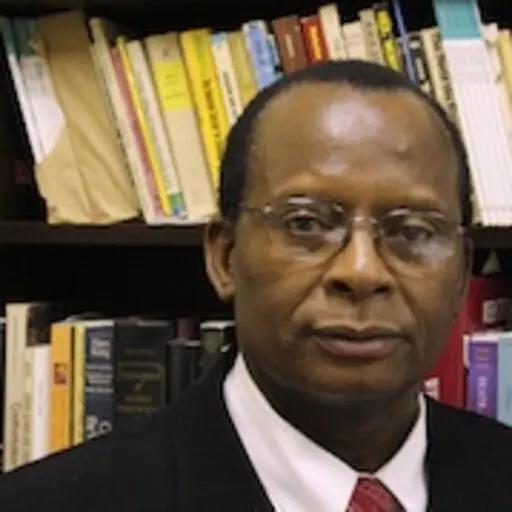
- Born: Gwinyai Henry Muzorewa
- Citizenship: Zimbabwean
- Education: Garrett-Evangelical Seminary
- Alma mater: Union Theological Seminary
- Occupations: Academic, Minister of Religion

Gwinyai Henry Muzorewa is a Zimbabwean clergyman, politician and the president of the United African National Council (UANC).

Muzorewa is a professor of theology at Lincoln University.

== Early life ==
Muzorewa is the younger brother of late former Zimbabwe-Rhodesia Prime Minister Bishop Abel Muzorewa, who led the country between 1978 and 1979.

He earned his Master of Divinity from Garrett Evangelical Seminary and his Master of Philosophy and Doctor of Philosophy from Union Theological Seminary.

Muzorewa was a leader at Epworth Theological College in Zimbabwe and later became chair of the Department of History, Political Science, Pan-African Studies, Philosophy, and Religion at Lincoln University.

== Books ==
Muzorewa has authored several books that include:

- Christ as Our Ancestor: Christology from an African Perspective
- Mission Studies Bibliography
- Religion, Race and Nationalism
- A College Introduction to Religion
- The Great Being: Creator, Yahweh, Chuku, Allah, God, Brahman: An Introduction to the World's Major Religions
- The Origins and Development of African Theology
- African Origins of Monotheism: Challenging the Eurocentric * Interpretation of God Concepts on the Continent and in Diaspora

== Philanthropy ==
Muzorewa donates part of his salary to Lincoln University's scholarship fund for first-generation college students, many of whom are from impoverished neighbourhoods in New York, Washington, D.C. and Philadelphia.

Muzorewa has dedicated time and effort to helping orphans and widows affected by the Zimbabwe War of Liberation.

== Political career ==
In 2018, Muzorewa approached the High Court seeking an order to compel the Zimbabwe Electoral Commission to accept his nomination papers. The Zimbabwean Election Commission had refused to accept Muzorewa's presidential nomination papers for having filed them late. Muzorewa said the delays were caused by officials at the Registrar-General's Office (RG) who took too long to issue him a replacement birth certificate. Muzorewa's name ultimately did not appear on the ballot.

Muzorewa was a candidate for the 2023 Presidential election for the UANC party.
