= Mthwakazi Republic Party =

Political party in Zimbabwe

- President: Mqondisi Moyo
- Chairperson: Mqondisi Ndebele
- Secretary-General: Ackim Mhlanga
- Founded: 2014
- Ideology: Separatism

Party flag

Website
- www.mrpnetwork.co.za

Mthwakazi Republic Party is a political party in Zimbabwe. It has been described as both secessionist and restorationist, seeking to restore the Mthwakazi kingdom.

== History ==
The party was founded in 2014 in Bulawayo.

In 2020, the party started a campaign to obtain 20,000 signatures to petition the government, neighbouring countries, the British government, and the Queen of the United Kingdom, to restore the Mthwakazi kingdom. Mqondisi Moyo, the party president, said this initiative was inspired by UN resolutions, specifically, that "minority groups must be afforded their autonomy and self-determination", and that self-determination should be afforded to "all minority groups whose human rights were being denied and their dignity trampled on by majority ethnic groups anywhere in the world". Moyo said the Mthwakazi kingdom is made up of 20 different tribes.

In 2018, the party delivered a petition to Pick n Pay Stores, saying the company had become "a liability to the people of Bulawayo and Matabeleland in general, through meddling in tribal politics of the current regime".

In 2020, the party alleged that Ingutsheni Hospital was employing workers from outside Bulawayo, saying this was "a contravention of the Constitutional rights of Matabeleland dwellers".

On 8 April 2021 the Mthwakazi Republic Party staged a peaceful protest in the Zimbabwean embassy in South Africa, demanding the release of nine of their members held in Khami prison.

In August 2024, the Southern African Development Community secretariat in Gaborone, Botswana, acknowledged the petition receipt from the party, which the party regards as part of its International lobbying strategy.

== Elections ==
Prior to 2018, the party had not participated in Zimbabwe's elections, wanting "Matabeleland independence first". In the 2018 Zimbabwean general election, the party ran candidates "within the borders of Mthwakazi", stating it would be "important in raising the profile of his party and its restorationist agenda". The party promised that if elected, "the education sector remains our single most important target".
