= Chipinge Central =

- Constituency for the National Assembly of Zimbabwe
- Province: Manicaland
- Region: Chipinge

Current constituency
- Seats: 1
- Party: ZANU–PF
- Member(s): Raymore Machingura

Chipinge Central is a constituency represented in the National Assembly of the Parliament of Zimbabwe located in Manicaland Province. Its current MP since the 2018 election is Raymore Machingura of ZANU–PF.

== Electoral history ==
In the 2008 parliamentary election the seat was won by the ZANU-PF candidate Chitima Alice Mwaemura defeating the MDC candidate from the Morgan Tsvangirai faction, Sithole Samson.

General Election 2008: Chipinge Central
Party	Candidate	Votes	%	±%
ZANU–PF	Chitima Alice Mwaemura	6377	52.11	
MDC–T	Sithole Samson	5862	47.89	
Majority		515	4.22	
Turnout		12239		

== See also ==
- List of Zimbabwean parliamentary constituencies
