= Joseph Makamba Busha =

Zimbabwean politician

Joseph Makamba Busha (29 July 1964) is a Zimbabwean businessman philanthropist and presidential candidate for Zimbabwe, was born in Mutoko, Mashonaland East province, Zimbabwe, and later moved to Murehwa in the same province where he lives with his family.

== Youth and studies ==
Joseph Busha was born in Mutoko, Zimbabwe; his father died three years later. After his father died in 1967 he was raised on his family's farm in Zimbabwe by his mother. He is a graduate of the University of Zimbabwe (Zimbabwe), University of Witwatersrand (Johannesburg, South Africa) and Warwick Business School, University of Warwick (Coventry, United Kingdom). He received four degrees, one diploma and seven professional certificates in mathematical finance.

== Career ==
Between 1994 and 2000, Busha worked for HSBC Securities (SA), Standard & Corporate Merchant Bank (SCMB) and NEDCOR, specializing in the construction and trading of derivative strategies, arbitrage trading, equities and interest rate financial modelling, yield curve modelling, quantitative investment research, marketing, investment banking and implementation of market risk management systems. In 2000, he founded JM Busha Investment Group, a social enterprise focusing on solution-driven investment management, investment banking, long-term insurance; financial risk management solutions and general financial advisory services. The company has subsidiary companies in Lesotho, Namibia, South Africa, Swaziland, Zambia and Zimbabwe. Joseph Busha serves as managing director.

== Advocacy ==
Busha is President of Freezim Congress, a political party in Zimbabwe. He is also the founder of JM BUSHA 54 Football Club, the NGO JM BUSHA 54 RACES for Peace and Unity in Africa (www.jmbusha54.com). This NGO focuses on programs in Africa supporting music, sports, education, and arts in order to bring peace.
