= 2023 Zimbabwean general election =

- 23 August 2023
- Presidential election
- Registered: 6,623,511 (▲16.28%)
- Turnout: 68.86% (▼16.33pp)
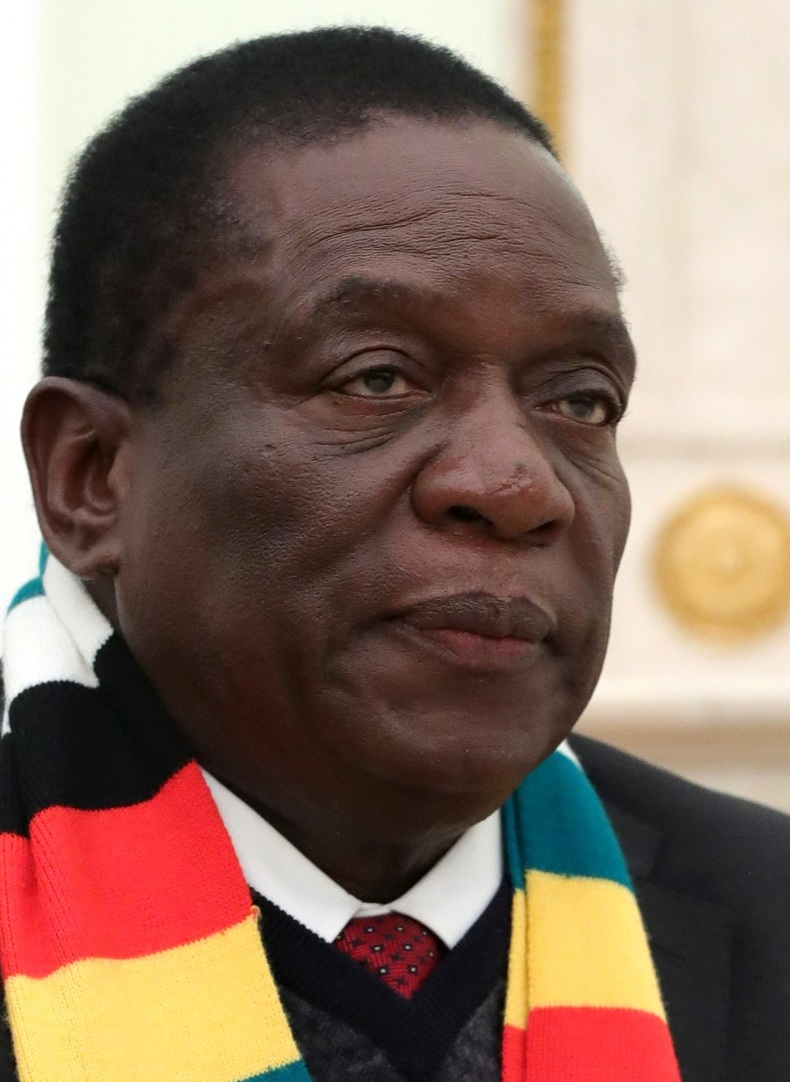

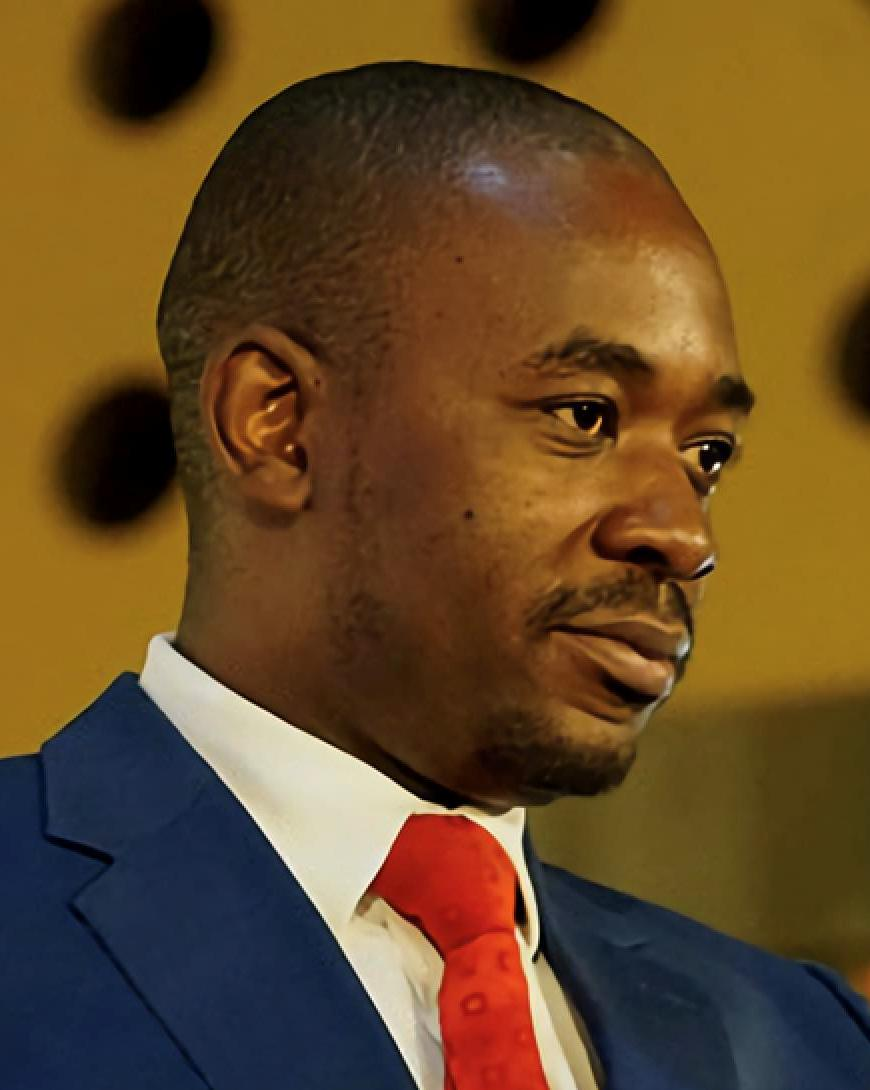
Candidate	Emmerson Mnangagwa	Nelson Chamisa
Party	ZANU–PF	CCC
Popular vote	2,350,711	1,967,343
Percentage	52.60%	44.03%
- Presidential election results by constituency
President before election
Emmerson Mnangagwa
ZANU–PF
Elected President
Emmerson Mnangagwa
ZANU–PF
- National Assembly
- All 280 seats in the National Assembly; 141 seats needed for a majority
Party	Leader	Vote %	Seats	+/–
ZANU–PF	Emmerson Mnangagwa	56.18	177	−2
CCC	Nelson Chamisa	41.46	103	New
This lists parties that won seats. See the complete results below.
House of Assembly election results by constituency
- Senate
- 60 of the 80 seats in the Senate; 41 seats needed for a majority
Party	Leader	Seats	+/–
ZANU–PF	Emmerson Mnangagwa	33	−1
CCC	Nelson Chamisa	27	New
This lists parties that won seats. See the complete results below.
Senate election results by province

General elections were held throughout Zimbabwe on 23 and 24 August 2023 to elect the president, legislators and councillors. The main race for presidential office was between two candidates of Karanga origin: ZANU–PF's Emmerson Mnangagwa and Citizens Coalition for Change's Nelson Chamisa.

The presidential election was won by the incumbent president Mnangagwa, while the governing ZANU–PF party won a majority of seats in parliament, with observer bodies describing the elections as not being free and fair.

The voter rolls for the election increased to 6.5 million, up from 5.8 million in 2018.

The Zimbabwe Electoral Commission spoke about the delays citing that they would compensate for the delays meaning if the polling station was opened at 11 am, it would close at 11 pm to ensure that there is 12 hours of voting. There were some reports from the Zimbabwe Broadcasting Corporation that about 5 wards in Manicaland people did not manage to vote at all because of logistical difficulties which were faced by the ZEC. About 35 more were delayed, of which 11 of them were in the capital of the country, Harare, which ultimately lead to ZEC declaring 24 August 2023 to be a second voting day, although voting is supposed to take place within one day according to Zimbabwean law.

Political parties competed for one presidential seat, 1,970 council seats and 280 parliamentary seats, and 60 senate seats to be elected for a five-year term. As per the Constitution of Zimbabwe, the president is to be elected using the two-round system.

The general population feared possible violence during the election because both sides have a history of political violence. Preelectoral polls suggested a runoff was likely, but Mnangagwa was elected in a single round with a narrow majority.

== Electoral system ==
Presidential Election

The president of Zimbabwe is elected using the two-round system.

Parliamentary Election

The 280 members of the National Assembly consist of 210 members elected in single-member constituencies along with 60 women and 10 youth seats elected by proportional representation in ten seven-seat constituencies based on the country's provinces. Voters cast a single vote, which is counted for both forms of election. The 80 members of the Senate include 60 members elected from ten six-member constituencies (also based on the provinces) by proportional representation using party lists; the lists must have a woman at the top and alternate between men and women. The other 20 seats include two reserved for persons with disabilities and 18 for traditional chiefs.

Local Authority Election

The Local Authority elections consist of 1970 members elected in single-member ward along with 603 seats reserved for women elected by proportional representation in local authorities based on an additional 30% of seats in a local authority being reserved for women. Voters cast a single vote, which is counted for both forms of election.

== Presidential candidates ==
The Zimbabwe Electoral Commission approved 11 candidates, but disqualified Saviour Kasukuwere for failing to meet residency requirements. The approved candidates include:

- Emmerson Mnangagwa of ZANU–PF - incumbent president of Zimbabwe since 2017.
- Nelson Chamisa of the Citizens Coalition for Change (CCC).
- Elisabeth Valerio of the United Zimbabwe Alliance (UZA).
- Joseph Makamba Busha of the FreeZim Congress (FZC)
- Tapiwa Trust Chikohora of the Zimbabwe Coalition for Peace and Development Party (ZCPD).
- Blessing Kasiyamhuru of the Zimbabwe Partnership for Prosperity (ZIPP).
- Lovemore Madhuku of the National Constitutional Assembly (NCA).
- Harry Peter Wilson of the Democratic Opposition Party (DOP).
- Henry Gwinyai Muzorewa of the United African National Council (UANC).
- Wilbert Mubaiwa of the National People's Congress (NPC).

== Campaign ==
The main issue of the election campaign was inflation and the economic crisis which had been exacerbated by the hyperinflation of the new Zimbabwean dollar.

The number of women candidates declined significantly compared to previous elections in 2018.

== Conduct ==
A Commonwealth observer mission was invited as part of an attempt to restore Zimbabwe's membership in the Commonwealth.

Voting was extended for another day after a lack of ballot papers disrupted voting, with some voters being forced to queue overnight to cast their ballots. There were reportedly delays of up to 10 hours in opposition stronghold areas. The Zimbabwe Electoral Commission acknowledged the late distribution of ballot papers at some polling stations and blamed it on printing delays "arising from numerous court challenges". Forty-one poll monitors were arrested during the election, being accused of illegally attempting to announce results before the state elections body. Accusations of vote rigging were made by the opposition.

== Results ==
=== President ===
Mnangagwa was re-elected president.

Candidate	Party	Votes	%
Emmerson Mnangagwa	ZANU–PF	2,350,711	52.60
Nelson Chamisa	Citizens Coalition for Change	1,967,343	44.03
Wilbert Mubaiwa	National People’s Congress	53,517	1.20
Douglas Mwonzora	Movement for Democratic Change – Tsvangirai	28,883	0.65
Joseph Makamba Busha	FreeZim Congress	18,816	0.42
Blessing Kasiyamhuru	Zimbabwe Partnership for Prosperity	13,060	0.29
Tapiwa Trust Chikohora	Zimbabwe Coalition for Peace and Development Party	10,230	0.23
Gwinyai Henry Muzorewa	United African National Council	7,053	0.16
Elisabeth Valerio	United Zimbabwe Alliance	6,989	0.16
Harry Peter Wilson	Democratic Opposition Party	6,743	0.15
Lovemore Madhuku	National Constitutional Assembly	5,323	0.12
Total		4,468,668	100.00
Valid votes		4,468,668	97.97
Invalid/blank votes		92,553	2.03
Total votes		4,561,221	100.00
Registered voters/turnout		6,623,511	68.86
Source: Zimbabwe Electoral Commission, ZEC

==== Results by province ====
Results by Province
Province	Joseph Makamba Busha		Nelson Chamisa		Tapiwa Trust Chikohora		Blessing Kasiyamhuru		Lovemore Madhuku		Emmerson Mnangagwa		Wilbert Mubaiwa		Gwinyai Henry Muzorewa		Douglas Mwonzora		Elisabeth Valerio		Harry Peter Wilson		Total Votes Rejected		Total Votes Cast	Total Valid Votes Cast	Voter Population	Voter Turnout %
Province	FreeZim Congress		CCC		ZCPD		ZIPP		NCA		ZANU–PF		NPC		UANC		MDC-T		UZA		DOP		Total Votes Rejected		Total Votes Cast	Total Valid Votes Cast	Voter Population	Voter Turnout %
Province	Votes	%	Votes	%	Votes	%	Votes	%	Votes	%	Votes	%	Votes	%	Votes	%	Votes	%	Votes	%	Votes	%	Votes	%	Total Votes Cast	Total Valid Votes Cast	Voter Population	Voter Turnout %
Bulawayo	437	0.26	131,037	78.52	306	0.18	255	0.15	129	0.08	31,053	18.61	1,389	0.83	230	0.14	1,004	0.60	803	0.48	249	0.15	2,040	1.21	168,932	166,892	287,352	58.79
Harare	1,236	0.17	517,494	71.46	778	0.11	804	0.11	543	0.07	193,881	26.77	4,958	0.68	470	0.06	2,337	0.32	1,365	0.19	325	0.04	10,071	1.37	734,262	724,191	1,084,601	67.70
Manicaland	2,496	0.45	240,672	43.47	1,547	0.28	1,814	0.33	1,074	0.19	290,960	52.56	8,588	1.55	993	0.18	3,891	0.70	713	0.13	877	0.16	11,354	2.01	564,979	553,625	829,324	68.13
Mashonaland Central	2,089	0.44	95,508	19.97	785	0.16	1,289	0.27	455	0.10	370,175	77.41	4,058	0.85	586	0.12	2,280	0.48	358	0.07	648	0.14	9,200	1.89	487,431	478,231	625,968	77.87
Mashonaland East	1,435	0.26	184,827	33.51	892	0.16	914	0.17	415	0.08	354,081	64.20	5,101	0.92	671	0.12	2,178	0.39	435	0.08	563	0.10	10,694	1.90	562,206	551,512	773,281	72.70
Mashonaland West	2,579	0.47	209,744	38.10	1,165	0.21	1,667	0.30	529	0.10	323,523	58.77	5,664	1.03	825	0.15	3,157	0.57	757	0.14	887	0.16	13,931	2.47	564,428	550,497	785,583	71.85
Masvingo	2,634	0.53	167,813	33.96	1,454	0.29	2,240	0.45	637	0.13	307,383	62.21	6,798	1.38	908	0.18	2,825	0.57	540	0.11	896	0.18	11,087	2.19	505,215	494,128	723,934	69.79
Matabeleland North	1,425	0.65	111,609	51.03	955	0.44	1,060	0.48	489	0.22	91,306	41.74	5,356	2.45	751	0.34	4,249	1.94	826	0.38	703	0.32	6,594	2.93	225,323	218,729	371,701	60.62
Matabeleland South	1,331	0.76	80,365	45.89	970	0.55	1,035	0.59	416	0.24	82,511	47.12	3,997	2.28	702	0.40	2,673	1.53	503	0.29	612	0.35	4,772	2.65	179,887	175,115	300,768	59.81
Midlands	3,154	0.57	228,274	41.08	1,378	0.25	1,982	0.36	636	0.11	305,838	55.03	7,608	1.37	917	0.17	4,289	0.77	689	0.12	983	0.18	12,810	2.25	568,558	555,748	840,999	67.61
National Total	18,816	0.42	1,967,343	44.03	10,230	0.23	13,060	0.29	5,323	0.12	2,350,711	52.60	53,517	1.20	7,053	0.16	28,883	0.65	6,989	0.16	6,743	0.15	92,553	2.03	4,561,221	4,468,668	6,623,511	68.86

=== National Assembly ===
The National Assembly has 210 single-member constituencies, the results of which are shown below. The remaining 70 seats comprises 60 seats which are reserved for women, six seats in each province, and 10 seats for youth, one seat in each province, which are filled based on the votes in the single-member constituencies using party-list proportional representation, distributed using the largest remainder method and the Hare quota.

On election day itself ZANU–PF won 136 seats and the CCC 73, with ZANU–PF retaining its rural base and the CCC capturing the urban vote. Voting in the Gutu West constituency was postponed to 11 November after one of the candidates died shortly before the elections. Following the parliamentary election in Gutu West, 65.24% of the constituency seats went to ZANU-PF and 34.76% of the constituency seats went to the CCC.

Party	Votes	%	Seats				
Party	Votes	%	Common	Women	Youth	Total	+/–
ZANU–PF	2,515,607	56.18	137	33	7	177	–2
Citizens Coalition for Change	1,856,393	41.46	73	27	3	103	New
Movement for Democratic Change – Tsvangirai	15,307	0.34	0	0	0	0	–88
Zimbabwe African People's Union	10,857	0.24	0	0	0	0	0
United Zimbabwe Alliance	4,937	0.11	0	0	0	0	New
National Constitutional Assembly	2,462	0.05	0	0	0	0	0
Democratic Opposition Party	2,105	0.05	0	0	0	0	New
FreeZim Congress	1,926	0.04	0	0	0	0	0
Democratic Union of Zimbabwe	1,881	0.04	0	0	0	0	0
Mthwakazi Republic Party	1,641	0.04	0	0	0	0	0
Zimbabwe National Revival Party	1,271	0.03	0	0	0	0	New
Zimbabwe African National Congress	628	0.01	0	0	0	0	New
United African National Council	574	0.01	0	0	0	0	0
Zimbabwe Coalition for Peace and Development Party	434	0.01	0	0	0	0	New
National People’s Congress	297	0.01	0	0	0	0	New
Economic Freedom Fighters	286	0.01	0	0	0	0	New
United Freedom Party	187	0.00	0	0	0	0	New
Freedom Alliance	148	0.00	0	0	0	0	New
Independents	60,445	1.35	0	0	0	0	–1
Total	4,477,386	100.00	210	60	10	280	+10
Source: Zimbabwe Electoral Commission Zimbabwe Elections

=== Senate ===
Party	Seats	+/–
ZANU–PF	33	–1
Citizens Coalition for Change	27	New
Chiefs	18	0
Persons with disabilities	2	0
Total	80	0
Source: Zimbabwe Electoral Commission

==== MPs who lost their seats ====
Defeated	Party	Constituency	Defeated by	Party
Starman Chamisa	Citizens Coalition for Change	Mbare	Martin Matinyanya	ZANU–PF
Temba Mliswa	Independent	Norton	Richard Tsvangirai	Citizens Coalition for Change
Raj Modi	ZANU–PF	Bulawayo South	Nicola Watson	Citizens Coalition for Change
Mthuli Ncube	ZANU–PF	Cowdray Park	Pashor Raphael Sibanda	Citizens Coalition for Change

== See also ==
- 2023 Zimbabwean by-elections
