= Results of the 1990 Zimbabwean general election =

Elections were held in Zimbabwe on 23 March 1990 to elect the President and Parliament. Robert Mugabe of the Zimbabwe African National Union – Patriotic Front (ZANU–PF) was reelected President with 83 percent of the vote against Edgar Tekere of the Zimbabwe Unity Movement, who received 17 percent. ZANU–PF won 117 of the 120 elected seats in Parliament, which after the abolition of the Senate in 1989 consisted of the unicameral House of Assembly.

== President ==
Candidate	Party	Votes	%
Robert Mugabe	Zimbabwe African National Union – Patriotic Front	2,026,976	83.05
Edgar Tekere	Zimbabwe Unity Movement	413,840	16.95
Invalid/blank votes		146,388	–
Total		2,587,204	100
Registered voters/turnout		4,799,333	53.91
Source: African Elections Database

== Parliament ==
=== Summary ===
Party	Votes	%	Seats
Zimbabwe African National Union – Patriotic Front	1,690,071	80.54	117
Zimbabwe Unity Movement	369,031	17.59	2
Zimbabwe African National Union – Ndonga	19,448	0.93	1
United African National Council	11,191	0.53	0
National Democratic Union	498	0.02	0
Independents	7,954	0.38	0
Invalid/blank votes	139,653	–	–
Total	2,237,846	100	120
Registered voters/turnout	5,874,115	56.83	–
Source: African Elections Database

=== Constituency results ===
The 120 elected seats in the House of Assembly were filled via first-past-the-post voting in single-member districts. ZANU–PF won 116 seats, the Zimbabwe Unity Movement won two, and ZANU–Ndonga took one. Elections could not be held on election day in Chimanimani because the ballots printed for that constituency did not include the candidates' names, but ZANU–PF won that seat as well when elections were held at a later date. Turnout figures include spoilt ballots and thus are not exact totals of the vote counts listed for the candidates in a constituency.

Bulawayo
Constituency	Candidate	Party	Votes	%
Bulawayo North	John Nkomo	ZANU–PF	8,581	65.35
Bulawayo North	Crispen Mwete	ZUM	4,550	34.65
Bulawayo North	Turnout		13,743	38.74
Bulawayo South	Lot Senda	ZANU–PF	9,661	53.65
Bulawayo South	Samson Mushore	ZUM	5,405	30.02
Bulawayo South	Themba Dlodlo	Independent	2,110	11.72
Bulawayo South	Zachariah Chigumira	ZANU–Ndonga	830	4.61
Bulawayo South	Turnout		18,789	56.56
Lobengula	Joshua Nkomo	ZANU–PF	8,706	84.27
Lobengula	Maxwell Nyandoro	ZUM	1,420	13.75
Lobengula	Stephen Chisimo	UANC	205	1.98
Lobengula	Turnout		10,576	24.62
Luveve (Note: Full results for Luveve were not released.)	Angeline Masuku	ZANU–PF	n/a	n/a
Luveve	Turnout		n/a	n/a
Magwegwe	Norman Zikhali	ZANU–PF	19,202	79.41
Magwegwe	Robert Mutendi	ZUM	3,988	16.49
Magwegwe	Tongesai Nyandoro	UANC	992	4.10
Magwegwe	Turnout		24,769	54.95
Makokoba	Sidney Malunga	ZANU–PF	11,136	77.47
Makokoba	Ishmael Nyakudarika	ZUM	3,238	22.53
Makokoba	Turnout		15,090	45.80
Mpopoma	Edson Ncube	ZANU–PF	13,164	77.05
Mpopoma	Philip Hadebe	ZUM	3,042	17.80
Mpopoma	Grey Bango	Independent	359	2.10
Mpopoma	Godfrey Mpezeni	UANC	287	1.68
Mpopoma	Phineas Sithole	ZANU–Ndonga	234	1.37
Mpopoma	Turnout		17,877	38.29
Nkulumane	Dumiso Dabengwa	ZANU–PF	15,494	80.31
Nkulumane	Victor Katsolo	ZUM	3,470	17.99
Nkulumane	Caleb Nyatoti	UANC	328	1.70
Nkulumane	Turnout		20,840	61.24
Pelandaba	Joseph Msika	ZANU–PF	10,902	83.20
Pelandaba	Christopher Mariga	ZUM	2,202	16.80
Pelandaba	Turnout		13,204	36.85
Harare
Constituency	Candidate	Party	Votes	%
Chitungwiza	Witness Mangwende	ZANU–PF	20,217	75.52
Chitungwiza	Dominic Macheka	ZUM	6,316	23.59
Chitungwiza	Munyamana Gwavhu	NDU	237	0.89
Chitungwiza	Turnout		27,533	64.97
Dzivarasekwa	William Mushonga	ZANU–PF	24,218	67.39
Dzivarasekwa	Elijah Manjeya	ZUM	11,240	31.28
Dzivarasekwa	Moses Jiri	UANC	477	1.33
Dzivarasekwa	Turnout		38,938	98.97
Glen View	Necasio Mangisi	ZANU–PF	15,415	61.45
Glen View	George Mugura	ZUM	9,348	37.26
Glen View	Jonias Makadzange	UANC	323	1.29
Glen View	Turnout		25,873	59.75
Highfield East	Herbert Ushewokunze	ZANU–PF	8,292	58.79
Highfield East	Joseph Dendere	ZUM	5,473	38.80
Highfield East	Jeremiah Nyamande	Independent	275	1.95
Highfield East	Xavier Chihota	NDU	64	0.45
Highfield East	Turnout		14,103	35.92
Highfield West	Richard Nyandoro	ZANU–PF	18,676	
Highfield West	Isaac Manyemba	ZUM	10,666	
Highfield West	William Chadzukwa	UANC	3,284	
Highfield West	Turnout		33,132	91.76
Kambuzuma	Oliver Chidawu	ZANU–PF	8,740	
Kambuzuma	Xebio Bosha	ZUM	5,423	
Kambuzuma	Frederick Mahere	UANC	247	
Kambuzuma	Nicholas Hatidani	Independent	241	
Kambuzuma	Farai Masango	Independent	77	
Kambuzuma	Turnout		14,728	43.67
Harare Central	Bernard Chidzero	ZANU–PF	9,545	
Harare Central	Raphael Hamadziripi	ZUM	6,864	
Harare Central	Turnout		17,120	37.31
Harare East	Margaret Dongo	ZANU–PF	16,390	
Harare East	Morgan Changamire	ZUM	9,770	
Harare East	Turnout		28,220	70.04
Harare North	Tirivanhu Mudariki	ZANU–PF	11,967	
Harare North	Masipula Sithole	ZUM	5,055	
Harare North	Turnout		18,371	56.76
Harare South	Smith Marara	ZANU–PF	15,100	
Harare South	Davison Gomo	ZUM	8,156	
Harare South	Noah Chifungo	ZANU–Ndonga	1,203	
Harare South	Turnout		25,762	n/a
Harare West	Don Chipango	ZANU–PF	15,675	
Harare West	Stephen Nyoka	ZUM	7,323	
Harare West	Turnout		24,460	55.16
Mabvuku	Irene Mugabe	ZANU–PF	14,107	
Mabvuku	Edyson Chiwara	ZUM	5,290	
Mabvuku	Pendeka Stanlake Nyakudya	UANC	342	
Mabvuku	Turnout		25,762	n/a
Manyame	Joel Mupfudza	ZANU–PF	14,298	
Manyame	Conrad Mukosera	ZUM	5,644	
Manyame	Turnout		21,320	45.95
Mbare East	Tony Gara	ZANU–PF	12,522	
Mbare East	Biston David	ZUM	4,420	
Mbare East	Tawinei Chitongo	NDU	197	
Mbare East	Turnout		17,880	51.76
Mbare West	Ephraim Masawi	ZANU–PF	8,315	
Mbare West	Nesbert Mutengezanwa	ZUM	4,415	
Mbare West	Robert Marowa	UANC	339	
Mbare West	Turnout		13,493	37.36
Mufakose	Patrick Marime	ZANU–PF	15,144	
Mufakose	Everisto Ngwena	ZUM	3,544	
Mufakose	Edward Mazaiwana	UANC	1,087	
Mufakose	Turnout		20,308	55.17
St Mary's	Joseph Macheka	ZANU–PF	18,323	
St Mary's	Stanley Musonza	ZUM	4,905	
St Mary's	Turnout		23,228	50.94
Zengeza	Benjamin Moyo	ZANU–PF	16,370	
Zengeza	Simon Mapengo	ZUM	7,646	
Zengeza	Turnout		26,156	60.89
Manicaland
Constituency	Candidate	Party	Votes	%
Buhera North	Nevison Nyashanu	ZANU–PF	20,260	92.49
Buhera North	Gabriel Chaiva	ZUM	1,644	7.51
Buhera North	Turnout		22,490	69.61
Buhera South	Kumbirai Kangai	ZANU–PF	22,423	94.68
Buhera South	Lovemore Shoniwa	ZUM	1,330	5.60
Buhera South	Turnout		24,481	n/a
Buhera West	Victoria Chitepo	ZANU–PF	9,988	99.42
Buhera West	Denny Munetsi	ZUM	58	0.58
Buhera West	Turnout		10,386	n/a
Chimanimani (Note: Because blank ballots were mistakenly sent to Chimanimani, the election there was postponed and held at a later date.)	Michael Mataure	ZANU–PF	10,687	84.34
Chimanimani	Lucky Maringapasi	ZUM	1,158	9.14
Chimanimani	Tinarwo Mwazviwanza	ZANU–Ndonga	545	4.30
Chimanimani	Kingdom Sithole	Independent	282	2.23
Chimanimani	Turnout		13,074	39.49
Chipinge North	Gordon Mushakavanhu	ZUM	10,087	44.83
Chipinge North	Joseph Muzite	ZANU–PF	7,065	31.40
Chipinge North	Goodson Sithole	ZANU–Ndonga	5,347	23.77
Chipinge North	Turnout		24,323	52.51
Chipinge South	Wiseman Zengeni	ZANU–Ndonga	8,970	42.10
Chipinge South	Killian Mvududu	ZUM	8,721	40.93
Chipinge South	Henry Moyana	ZANU–PF	3,616	16.97
Chipinge South	Turnout		22,309	47.62
Makoni Central	Didymus Mutasa	ZANU–PF	10,805	74.78
Makoni Central	Godfrey Mandimutsira	ZUM	3,644	25.22
Makoni Central	Turnout		n/a	n/a
Makoni East	Dexter Chavunduka	ZANU–PF	18,755	75.80
Makoni East	Winnie Mwashita	ZUM	5,988	24.20
Makoni East	Turnout		27,102	80.37
Makoni South	Gibson Munyero	ZANU–PF	9,626	79.22
Makoni South	Lazarus Mtungwazi	ZUM	2,525	20.78
Makoni South	Turnout		13,499	31.80
Makoni West (Note: Full results for Makoni West were not released.)	Moven Mahachi	ZANU–PF	n/a	n/a
Makoni West	Turnout		n/a	n/a
Mutare Central	Daniel Sithole	ZUM	9,058	49.85
Mutare Central	Zororo Duri	ZANU–PF	8,700	47.88
Mutare Central	Clement Mhlanga	ZANU–Ndonga	411	2.26
Mutare Central	Turnout		18,842	41.71
Mutare North	Oppah Muchinguri	ZANU–PF	14,165	48.63
Mutare North	Giles Mutsekwa	ZUM	13,484	46.29
Mutare North	David Mabunyara	ZANU–Ndonga	1,481	5.08
Mutare North	Turnout		30,671	72.22
Mutare South	Lazarus Nzarayebani	ZANU–PF	10,520	72.78
Mutare South	Christopher Zimunya	ZUM	3,925	27.15
Mutare South	Turnout		15,636	39.89
Mutare West	Moton Malianga	ZANU–PF	14,806	77.30
Mutare West	Wilson Murwiri	ZUM	4,349	22.70
Mutare West	Turnout		20,765	46.67
Mutasa	Misheck Chinamasa	ZANU–PF	6,864	53.33
Mutasa	Christopher Nyamwanza	ZUM	6,007	46.67
Mutasa	Turnout		14,234	33.89
Nyanga	Tichaendepi Masaya	ZANU–PF	11,184	64.69
Nyanga	Sylvester Matsapa	ZUM	6,025	34.85
Nyanga	Turnout		19,289	43.10
Mashonaland Central
Constituency	Candidate	Party	Votes	%
Bindura	Joice Mujuru	ZANU–PF	35,262	89.56
Bindura	Emmanuel Magoche	ZUM	4,110	10.43
Bindura	Turnout		41,669	92.91
Centenary	Border Gezi	ZANU–PF	unopposed	
Chiweshe	Chenhamo Chimutengwende	ZANU–PF	unopposed	
Guruve	Ephraim Chafesuka	ZANU–PF	unopposed	
Mount Darwin	Richard Mujana	ZANU–PF	22,892	92.21
Mount Darwin	Peter Sango	ZUM	1,363	5.49
Mount Darwin	Olis Manyeruke	Independent	570	2.29
Mount Darwin	Turnout		26,425	n/a
Mukumbura	Joseph Kaparadza	ZANU–PF	unopposed	
Shamva	Donald Nyamaropa	ZANU–PF	unopposed	
Mashonaland East
Constituency	Candidate	Party	Votes	%
Chihota	Ernest Chipitiri	ZANU–PF	10,343	87.93
Chihota	Jackson Muzambi	ZUM	1,088	9.25
Chihota	Zacharia Nyamadzawo	Independent	332	2.82
Chihota	Turnout		12,599	29.47
Chinomora	Kenneth Bute	ZANU–PF	13,525	89.50
Chinomora	Anathasio Mushimbo	ZUM	1,586	10.50
Chinomora	Turnout		16,393	42.08
Goromonzi	Herbert Murerwa	ZANU–PF	19,678	86.90
Goromonzi	Percy Chigodora	ZUM	2,967	13.10
Goromonzi	Turnout		24,460	51.49
Marondera	Sydney Sekeramayi	ZANU–PF	18,892	85.53
Marondera	Sheila van Reenen	ZUM	3,195	14.47
Marondera	Turnout		23,479	66.20
Mudzi	Bainos Mupezeni	ZANU–PF	unopposed	
Murehwa North	Alois Mangwende	ZANU–PF	unopposed	
Murehwa South	David Karimanzira	ZANU–PF	unopposed	
Mutoko North	Mabel Chinomona	ZANU–PF	unopposed	
Mutoko South	Richard Katsande	ZANU–PF	19,176	95.36
Mutoko South	Claudius Mugambiwa	Independent	933	4.64
Mutoko South	Turnout		22,174	58.72
Wedza	Stanlake Marwodzi	ZANU–PF	16,507	91.66
Wedza	Joshua Siya	ZUM	1,501	8.34
Wedza	Turnout		19,993	50.76
Mashonaland West
Constituency	Candidate	Party	Votes	%
Chegutu	Mashava Mugwagwa	ZANU–PF	20,420	86.52
Chegutu	Edward Hamadziripi Chipape	ZUM	3,182	13.48
Chegutu	Turnout		25,301	76.18
Hurungwe	Kenneth Marombe	ZANU–PF	25,818	87.66
Hurungwe	Clement Gondo	ZUM	3,635	12.34
Hurungwe	Turnout		31,681	89.63
Kadoma East	Edna Madzongwe	ZANU–PF	18,312	88.20
Kadoma East	Leslie Mashayamombe	ZUM	2,450	11.80
Kadoma East	Turnout		33,498	95.18
Kadoma West	Enos Chikowore	ZANU–PF	25,865	85.58
Kadoma West	Luke Bosha	ZUM	4,368	14.45
Kadoma West	Turnout		31,663	73.16
Kariba	Tongayi Nyikadzino	ZANU–PF	27,482	87.48
Kariba	Peter Munjaranji	ZUM	3,933	12.52
Kariba	Turnout		33,498	76.18
Karoi	Edgar Kwenda	ZANU–PF	5,432	88.64
Karoi	Tommy Charewa	ZUM	696	11.36
Karoi	Turnout		6,483	18.10
Makonde Central	Nathan Shamuyarira	ZANU–PF	23,430	85.90
Makonde Central	Sungano Janhi Moyo	ZUM	3,171	11.63
Makonde Central	William Marumahoko	UANC	674	2.47
Makonde Central	Turnout		28,678	76.29
Makonde East	Mudhomeni Chivende	ZANU–PF	27,865	86.23
Makonde East	Noah Bangure	ZUM	4,451	13.77
Makonde East	Turnout		35,104	74.99
Makonde North	Swithun Mombeshora	ZANU–PF	13,883	86.73
Makonde North	Cleopas Watama	ZUM	2,125	13.27
Makonde North	Turnout		16,953	42.80
Makonde West	Sean Hundermark	ZANU–PF	16,507	91.60
Makonde West	Robert Ruzivo	ZUM	1,513	8.40
Makonde West	Turnout		19,204	45.47
Mhondoro	Felix Muchemwa	ZANU–PF	10,610	87.70
Mhondoro	Douglas Chanakira	ZUM	1,488	12.30
Mhondoro	Turnout		12,707	34.74
Ngezi	Frederick Mugwangwavari	ZANU–PF	8,222	95.36
Ngezi	Lovemore Tapera	ZUM	400	4.64
Ngezi	Turnout		9,036	25.41
Zvimba	Sabina Mugabe	ZANU–PF	8,008	93.85
Zvimba	Esau Chakupe	ZUM	525	6.15
Zvimba	Turnout		8,852	20.73
Masvingo
Constituency	Candidate	Party	Votes	%
Bikita East	Gabriel Machinga	ZANU–PF	unopposed	
Bikita West	Jewel Kufandada	ZANU–PF	10,715	74.23
Bikita West	Kenneth Matimba	ZANU–PF	3,719	25.77
Bikita West	Turnout		15,656	41.93
Chiredzi Central	Henry Pote	ZANU–PF	21,903	83.21
Chiredzi Central	Leo Chanda	ZUM	4,420	16.79
Chiredzi Central	Turnout		29,239	68.96
Chiredzi South	Aaron Baloyi	ZANU–PF	unopposed	
Chiredzi–Zaka	Titus Maluleke	ZANU–PF	unopposed	
Chivi North	Ketina Mudamburi	ZANU–PF	unopposed	
Chivi South	Paradza Mandebvu	ZANU–PF	18,834	96.09
Chivi South	Munashe Chidavashe	ZUM	767	3.91
Chivi South	Turnout		20,368	48.95
Gutu East	Ephraim Marwizi	ZANU–PF	8,865	59.83
Gutu East	Nelson Mawema	ZANU–PF	5,951	40.17
Gutu East	Turnout		15,367	41.91
Gutu North	Joseph Mandaba	ZANU–PF	12,409	61.84
Gutu North	Oliver Munyaradzi	ZANU–PF	7,657	38.16
Gutu North	Turnout		21,467	59.40
Gutu South	Shuvai Mahofa	ZANU–PF	18,799	93.88
Gutu South	Isaac Chimwanda	ZUM	1,226	6.12
Gutu South	Turnout		20,758	60.06
Masvingo Central	Dzikamai Mavhaire	ZANU–PF	26,188	87.02
Masvingo Central	Naboth Musabayana	ZUM	3,905	12.98
Masvingo Central	Turnout		32,062	76.36
Masvingo North	George Mudukuti	ZANU–PF	unopposed	
Masvingo South	Eddison Zvobgo	ZANU–PF	unopposed	
Mwenezi	Zephaniah Matchaba-Hove	ZANU–PF	22,547	95.33
Mwenezi	Philemon Baloyi	ZUM	1,105	4.67
Mwenezi	Turnout		24,916	56.08
Zaka East	Simbi Mubako	ZANU–PF	7,118	53.23
Zaka East	Wurayayi Chisamba	ZANU–PF	4,812	38.62
Zaka East	Isaac Gwenure	ZUM	530	4.25
Zaka East	Turnout		13,371	n/a
Zaka West	Jefta Chindanya	ZANU–PF	19,803	94.26
Zaka West	Gladman Machakata	ZUM	1,205	5.74
Zaka West	Turnout		22,536	47.25
Matabeleland North
Constituency	Candidate	Party	Votes	%
Binga	Paul Siachimbo	ZANU–PF	7,358	73.10
Binga	Abraham Chiketo	ZUM	2,708	26.90
Binga	Turnout		14,199	34.83
Bubi	Micah Bhebhe	ZANU–PF	14,639	84.39
Bubi	Michael Ndondo	ZUM	2,708	15.61
Bubi	Turnout		19,102	56.17
Hwange	Crispen Sibanda	ZANU–PF	19,790	77.19
Hwange	Elton Muchemwa	ZUM	5,847	22.81
Hwange	Turnout		28,340	61.97
Lupane	Nkosembi Khumalo	ZANU–PF	18,379	85.08
Lupane	Thomas Sililo Masuku	ZUM	3,222	14.92
Lupane	Turnout		23,790	50.33
Nkayi	Welshman Mabhena	ZANU–PF	16,313	93.24
Nkayi	Rogers Ndlovu	ZUM	1,182	6.76
Nkayi	Turnout		19,797	48.91
Nyamandhlovu	Max Rosenfels	ZANU–PF	10,462	85.35
Nyamandhlovu	Geoffrey Peterson	ZUM	1,796	14.65
Nyamandhlovu	Turnout		13,204	36.49
Tsholotsho	Amos Mkwananzi	ZANU–PF	19,993	91.17
Tsholotsho	Elliot Mlotshwa	ZUM	1,936	8.83
Tsholotsho	Turnout		24,028	53.61
Matabeleland South
Constituency	Candidate	Party	Votes	%
Beitbridge	Kembo Mohadi	ZANU–PF	16,190	86.05
Beitbridge	Simon Ncube	ZUM	2,624	13.95
Beitbridge	Turnout		21,502	52.43
Bulilimamangwe North	Richard Ndlovu	ZANU–PF	16,385	88.30
Bulilimamangwe North	Shortie Ncube	ZUM	2,172	11.70
Bulilimamangwe North	Turnout		20,233	56.81
Bulilimamangwe South	Simon Khaya-Moyo	ZANU–PF	12,151	89.00
Bulilimamangwe South	Michael Ndawana	ZUM	1,502	11.00
Bulilimamangwe South	Turnout		15,233	45.67
Gwanda North	Johnson Ndlovu	ZANU–PF	15,364	84.33
Gwanda North	Agrippa Madlela	Independent	1,524	8.36
Gwanda North	Clement Khumalo	ZUM	1,331	7.31
Gwanda North	Turnout		19,083	55.06
Gwanda South (Note: Full results for Gwanda South were not released.)	Eliah Masiyane	ZANU–PF	n/a	n/a
Gwanda South	Turnout		n/a	n/a
Insiza	Naison Ndlovu	ZANU–PF	13,660	84.22
Insiza	Newman Ndlela	ZUM	2,560	15.78
Insiza	Turnout		17,848	45.59
Matobo	Stephen Nkomo	ZANU–PF	17,346	92.91
Matobo	Reason Nkomazana	ZUM	1,323	7.099
Matobo	Turnout		21,282	58.33
Umzingwane	Thenjiwe Lesabe	ZANU–PF	12,122	82.22
Umzingwane	Hezikia Hlabangana	ZUM	1,740	11.80
Umzingwane	Aaron Ndabambi	Independent	882	5.98
Umzingwane	Turnout		15,606	35.52
Midlands
Constituency	Candidate	Party	Votes	%
Chikomba	Ernest Kadungure	ZANU–PF	25,929	94.23
Chikomba	Jesmiel Chakauya	ZUM	1,589	5.77
Chikomba	Turnout		28,630	59.58
Chirumanzu	Hlomayi Mangwende	ZANU–PF	21,468	92.04
Chirumanzu	Hoinos Machaya	ZUM	1,856	7.96
Chirumanzu	Turnout		24,649	56.07
Gokwe East	Titus Marongwe	ZANU–PF	19,888	91.87
Gokwe East	Isaiah Mucheki	ZUM	1,761	8.13
Gokwe East	Turnout		22,989	67.05
Gokwe North	Benson Mbowa	ZANU–PF	20,672	88.73
Gokwe North	Patrick Manwende	ZUM	2,626	11.27
Gokwe North	Turnout		24,862	55.48
Gokwe South	Jason Machaya	ZANU–PF	21,785	89.66
Gokwe South	Nokuthula Nduka	ZUM	2,511	10.34
Gokwe South	Turnout		25,872	74.60
Gokwe West (Note: Full results for Gokwe West were not released.)	George Marange	ZANU–PF	n/a	n/a
Gokwe West	Turnout		n/a	n/a
Gweru Central	Simon Muzenda	ZANU–PF	14,083	71.84
Gweru Central	Patrick Kombayi	ZUM	5,234	26.70
Gweru Central	Bernard Kutesera	UANC	285	1.45
Gweru Central	Turnout		20,173	52.54
Gweru North (Note: Full results for Gweru North were not released.)	Cyril Ndebele	ZANU–PF	n/a	n/a
Gweru North	Turnout		n/a	n/a
Gweru South	Ernest Tongogara	ZANU–PF	17,311	76.73
Gweru South	Bernard Gwati	ZUM	4,863	21.55
Gweru South	Onward Manyeruke	UANC	387	1.72
Gweru South	Turnout		23,281	55.28
Kwekwe	Emmerson Mnangagwa	ZANU–PF	23,898	77.11
Kwekwe	Sylvester Chibanda	ZUM	7,094	22.89
Kwekwe	Turnout		32,428	78.97
Mberengwa East	Richard Hove	ZANU–PF	21,632	95.56
Mberengwa East	Ben Shumba	ZUM	1,004	4.44
Mberengwa East	Turnout		23,355	51.27
Mberengwa West	Ben Mataga	ZANU–PF	22,005	88.87
Mberengwa West	Choboro Masarira	Independent	1,513	6.11
Mberengwa West	Mathias Munyenyiwa	ZUM	1,242	5.02
Mberengwa West	Turnout		26,216	55.76
Shurugwi	David Ruzive	ZANU–PF	25,575	94.01
Shurugwi	Peter Musiyiwa	ZUM	1,630	5.99
Shurugwi	Turnout		28,343	63.22
Silobela	Steven Vuma	ZANU–PF	14,402	85.31
Silobela	Kaiza Jackson	ZUM	2,479	14.69
Silobela	Turnout		17,589	54.16
Zvishavane	Tsungirirai Hungwe	ZANU–PF	22,438	88.82
Zvishavane	Raphael Mudari	ZUM	2,823	11.18
Zvishavane	Turnout		26,461	58.00
Zhombe	Peter Hewlett	ZANU–PF	15,912	91.58
Zhombe	Rodger Ross	ZUM	1,083	6.23
Zhombe	Raphael Muroyiwa	Independent	380	2.19
Zhombe	Turnout		18,241	53.71
Sources: Chimanimani and Mberengwa East; all other constituencies
