= Peter Hewlett =

Zimbabwean farmer and politician (born 1941)

Member of Parliament
- In office 1995–2000
- Preceded by: Constituency established
- Succeeded by: Constituency abolished
- Constituency: Kwekwe North
- In office 1990–1995
- Preceded by: Josiah Chinyati
- Succeeded by: Daniel Mackenzie Ncube
- Constituency: Zhombe

Personal details
- Born: 18 July 1941 (age 85) Fort Victoria, Southern Rhodesia (now Masvingo, Zimbabwe)
- Party: ZANU–PF
- Spouse: Geraldine Thomas
- Children: 2
- Education: University of Missouri; University of Texas at Austin
- Occupation: Farmer, politician

Peter William Hewlett (born 18 July 1941) is a Zimbabwean farmer and politician who served as a member of Parliament in the House of Assembly from 1990 to 2000. A member of ZANU–PF, he represented the Zhombe and Kwekwe North constituencies.

Born in Masvingo, he attended the Ruzawi and Peterhouse schools before going to the United States to study agriculture and ranching at the University of Missouri and the University of Texas at Austin. He returned to Southern Rhodesia and began farming near Masvingo, and later, near Kwekwe. He was also involved in the meat-processing industry and owned a shop in Harare. Upon his election to the House of Assembly in 1990, he became one of three white parliamentarians in Zimbabwe.

== Early life and education ==
Hewlett was born on 18 July 1941 in Fort Victoria, Southern Rhodesia (now Masvingo, Zimbabwe). He attended Ruzawi School and Peterhouse School for his primary and secondary education, both located near the town of Marandellas (now Marondera). He decided to become a farmer like his parents, and went to the United States for two years to study modern farming methods. There, he studied cattle ranching and irrigation at the University of Missouri and beef production at the University of Texas at Austin.

== Career ==
After his two-year tour of study, Hewlett returned to Southern Rhodesia and leased a farm near Fort Victoria. In the 1960s, he purchased a farm near Que Que (now Kwekwe), where he grew maize and wheat. He bought East Range Farm in 1975 and developed it into a cattle ranch. He went on to start his own butcheries and later entered the meat-processing industry. In 1982, he purchased the 3,288-hectare Lorraine farm in Kwekwe District. He eventually owned seven farms in total in the Kwekwe area. By 1995, he was running a gourmet shop in Harare. In 1998, his company Umshandige Ranches owned two farms covering a total 14,180 hectares.

In the March 1990 general election, Hewlett ran as the ZANU–PF candidate for the Zhombe constituency. He was elected with 92 percent of the vote against Rodger Ross of the Zimbabwe Unity Movement, who received six percent, and independent candidate Raphael Muroyiwa with two percent. Hewlett was one of three white members of parliament, alongside Max Rosenfels and Sean Hundermark, both also members of ZANU–PF. In March 1992, after Parliament passed legislation allowing for seizure of white-owned farms with partial compensation, Hewlett warned that the law would destroy the Zimbabwean economy. He called on the government to slow down the land reform process and use the farms it had already purchased before acquiring more. Hewlett, who was absent for the vote, had himself already sold five of his seven farms to the government.

In the April 1995 election, Hewlett was reelected to parliament unopposed for the newly created Kwekwe North constituency. He was once again one of three white MPs, along with Allan Elliot and Jacobus de Wet. He did not run for reelection in 2000. That year, his Lorraine farm was listed among those set to be acquired without compensation by the Zimbabwean government.

== Personal life ==
Hewlett was married to the Northern Rhodesian-born Geraldine Ann Thomas. Together, they had two children, Grant and Mireille. Grant is a Kwekwe-based businessman, while Mireille is a competitive rower. Geraldine, Grant, and Mireille Hewlett were among the Zimbabweans named in the Panama Papers. Hewlett speaks Shona fluently.
