= Zibagwe RDC =

Local authority in Kwekwe District, Zimbabwe

Coordinates: 18.934792°S 29.807852°E

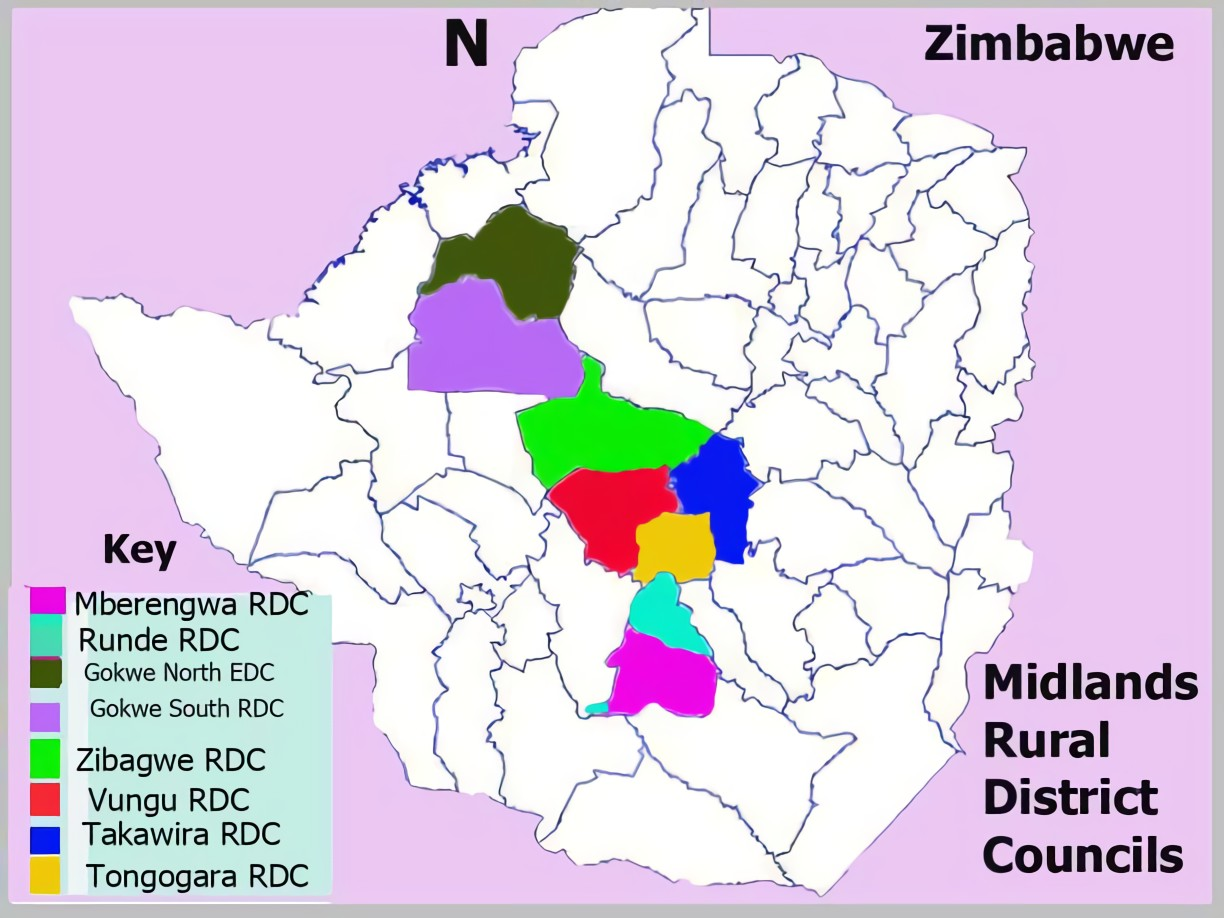
Midlands RDCs

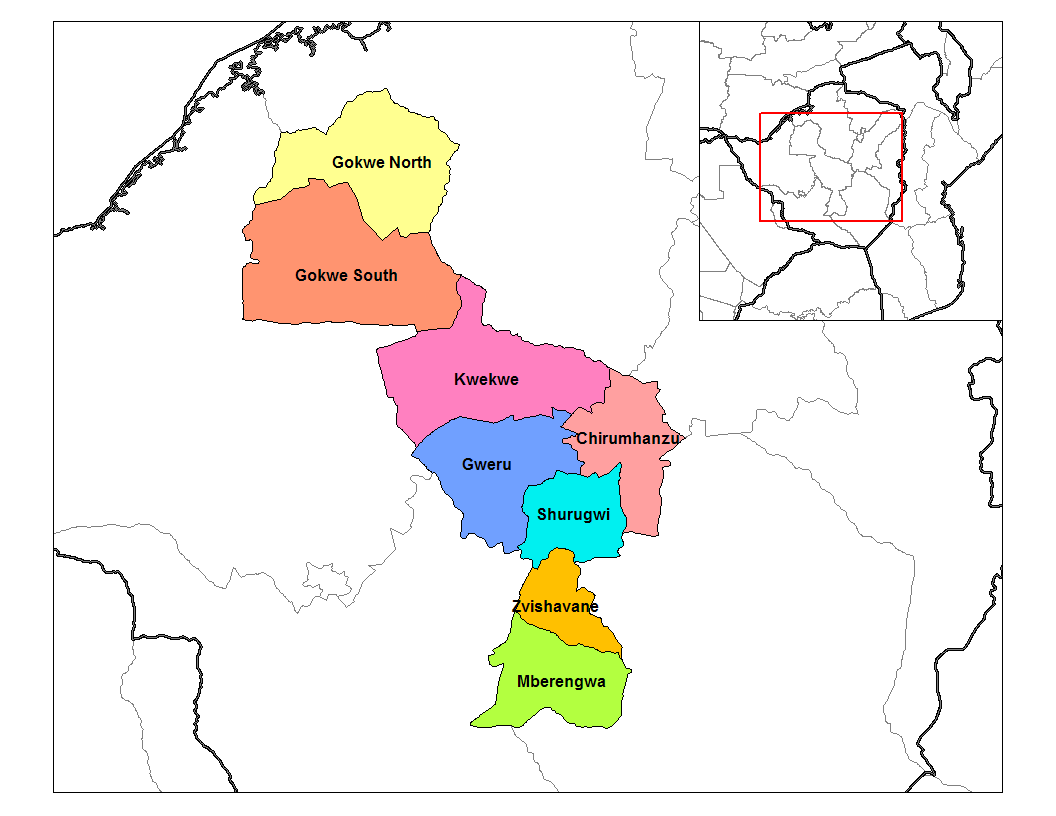
Midlands districts

Zimbabwe Rural District Council is a rural local government arm in Kwekwe District created under the Rural District Councils Act: Chapter 20.13. It was formed from the amalgamation of the former Kwekwe Rural Council and the Mashambazhou District Council in 1993. An RDC is the administrative equivalent of an urban town council, but for a rural area.

== Background ==
There are 60 rural district councils from Zimbabwe's eight non-metropolitan provinces. Midlands Province has eight rural district councils, including Zibagwe RDC.

The district is subdivided into 33 wards, and the registered villagers in each ward elect a councillor to represent them at the district level in the Rural District Council (RDC).

A district is administered by both the district administrator (DA) and the council (RDC). The DA exerts considerable influence within council. He is a senior civil servant employed according to the Public Service Commission regulations. He attends council meetings as a non-voting observer and adviser. Unlike councillors, the DA has significant powers outside the council, in as much that he is involved in the appointment of chiefs.

The Rural District Council is the only democratic rural local governance body at the district level. Its members are elected as provided by the constitution (2013 Constitution section 275.2.b) and all so elected from each ward form a rural district council which is the equivalent of the urban town council.

Each elected councillor chairs the Ward Development Committee (WADCO or WDC) at ward level. Other members of the WADCO are locally appointed from committee members of village development committees (VIDCO).

The CEO is appointed by the RDC and approved by the minister, or the minister might do both. The CEO exerts significant authority and even administers the oath of office for councillors and keeps the minutes of meetings. He is a senior staff member permanently employed by the council unlike his counterparts, whose terms of office cease just before the next elections; usually theirs are five-year terms.

== Leadership ==
Chief Executive Officer (CEO):

- Farai Machaya

(not to be confused with the Midlands Governor's son)

Chairman 2013–2018:

- Clr Chamunogwa Andersen Zvishamira (Ward 32)

Vice-Chairman 2013–2018:

- Clr Jason Deetlefs (Ward 21)

== Zibagwe RDC (2013–2018) ==
Ward No.	Ward Name	Councilor (alt.)	Gender	Affiliated to	Constistituency	Remarks
#01	--	Sebastian Masengu	m	Zanu-PF	Churumanzu-Zibagwe	
#02	--	Edson Basilio Mutosvori	m	Zanu-PF	Churumanzu-Zibagwe	
#03	--	Boneface Vunganai	m	Zanu-PF	Redcliff	
#04	--	Ranganai Chauke	m	Zanu-PF	Silobela	
#05	--	Lovemore Siziba	m	Zanu-PF	Silobela	
#06	Mabura	Ernest Tuva Madarani	m	Zanu-PF	Zhombe	
#07	Sidakeni	Benjamibe Moyo	m	Zanu-PF	Zhombe	
#08	Empress Mine	Ambrose Ncube	m	Zanu-PF	Zhombe	
#09	Gwesela West	Mhurai Muzunze	f	Zanu-PF	Zhombe	
#10	Zhombe Central	Josephat Mazhara	m	Zanu-PF	Zhombe	
#11	--	Mirriam Dube	f	Zanu-PF	Zhombe	
#12	--	Erasmus Machingura	m	Zanu-PF	Zhombe	
#13	--	Cafenol Moyo	m	Zanu-PF	Zhombe	
#14	--	Peter Ncube	m	Zanu-PF	Zhombe	
#15	--	Elliot Mapfumo	m	Zanu-PF	Silobela	
#16	--	Martin Sylvester Sibanda	m	Zanu-PF	Zhombe	
#17	--	Best Moyo	m	Zanu-PF	Silobela	
#18	--	Muzondiwa M Ndere	m	Zanu-PF	Silobela	
#19	--	Cleto Chifana	m	Zanu-PF	Silobela	
#21	--	Jason E Deetlefs	m	Zanu-PF	Silobela	Vice-Chairman
#22	--	Navison Dube	m	Zanu-PF	Redcliff	
#23	--	Lovemore Ncube	m	Zanu-PF	Redcliff	
#24	--	Munashe Majani	m	Zanu-PF	Redcliff	
#25#	--	Stanley Ndlovu	m	MDC-T	Silobela	
#26	--	Memezi Ncube	m	Zanu-PF	Silobela	
#27	--	Thabani Nsingo	m	MDC-T	Silobela	
#28	--	Thabesile Mloyi	f	Zanu-PF	Silobela	
#29	--	Willard Moyo	m	MDC-T	Silobela	
#30	--	Elisha Gwatidzo	m	Zanu-PF	Redcliff	
#31	--	Augustine Ruwizhi	m	Zanu-PF	Churumanzu-Zibagwe	
#32	Donjane	Chamunogwa A Zvishamira	m	Zanu-PF	Zhombe	Chairman
#33	--	Jabulani Munikwa	m	MDC-T	Silobela	

|SEE 2013_Local Authorities Election Results | External Link

== Constituencies covered ==
Constituency Name	Member of Parliament (alt.)	Gender	Total Wards	Wards	Affiliated to
Churumanzu-Zibagwe	Prosper Machando	m	3	1, 2, 31	Zanu-PF
Redcliff	Lloyd Dzikamai Mukapiko	m	5	3, 22, 23, 24, 30	MDC Alliance
Silobela	Mthokozisi Manoki-Mpofu	m	14	4,5, 15, 17, 18, 19, 20, 21, 25, 26, 27, 28, 29, 33	Zanu-PF
Zhombe	Edmore Samambwa	m	11	6, 7, 8, 9, 10, 11, 12, 13, 14, 16, 32	Zanu-PF

Churumanzu-Zibagwe has only three wards in this rural district. Most of its wards are in Takawira Rural District Council.

== See also ==
- Kwekwe District
- Kwekwe
- Redcliff
- Silobela
- Zhombe
- Zhombe Constituency

=== Zibagwe RDC (2008–2013) ===
Ward No.	Ward Name	2008–2013 Councilor	Gender	Affiliated to
#04	--	Chademana J. J. Ephraim	m	Zanu PF
#06	Mabura	Madarani Ernest Tuwa	m	Zanu PF
#07	Sidakeni	Gambara Boniface Faku	m	MDC Tsvangirai
#08		Nyoni Tennyson	m	MDC Tsvangirai
#10	Empress Mine	Majaqaba Judith	f	MDC Tsvangirai
#11	--	Magugu Patson	m	MDC Tsvangirai
#12	--	Charumbira Phineas	m	MDC Tsvangirai
13	--	Moyo Munikelwa Veli	-	MDC Tsvangirai
#14	-	Ncube Sandra	f	MDC Tsvangirai
16	--	Mandela Khumbulani	m	MDC Tsvangirai
18	--	Ndere Muzondiwa Morris	m	Zanu PF
19	--	Muzanenhamo Tsitsi Maria	f	Zanu PF
20	--	Moyo Maqhawe	m	MDC Tsvangirai
21	--	Mlilo Boyana Laxson	m	MDC Tsvangirai
#22	--	Sibanda Moffath	m	MDC Tsvangirai
#24	--	Mahlangu Leo	m	MDC Tsvangirai
#25	--	Ndlovu Stanley	m	MDC Tsvangirai
#27	--	Nyathi Misheck Magulangafi	m	MDC Tsvangirai
#29	--	Moyo Willard	m	MDC Tsvangirai
#32	Donjane	Zvishamira C. Andiseni	m	Zanu PF
