= Paul Mwazha =

Zimbabwean clergyman (1918–2025)

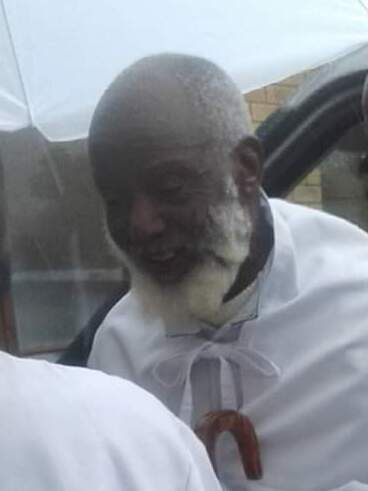
- Mwazha in 2017
- Born: 25 October 1918; Holy Cross Mission, Chirumanzu, Southern Rhodesia (now Zimbabwe)
- Died: 20 November 2025 (aged 107)
- Education: Qualified Teacher
- Alma mater: Howard Teaching Institute
- Occupation: Clergyman
- Known for: Leader of The African Apostolic Church
- Children: 7

Ecclesiastical career
- Religion: Christianity
- Church: The African Apostolic Church, VaApostora veAfrica
- Congregations: Apostolic
- Title: Archbishop

Ernest Paul Mamvura Mwazha (25 October 1918 – 20 November 2025) was a Zimbabwean clergyman. His followers refer to him as Mutumwa, which translates to "angelic messenger" in Shona. He was the founder and leader of the African Apostolic Church.

== Early life ==
Mwazha was born on 25 October 1918 at Holy Cross Mission, in Chirumhanzu District, near Mvuma, in the Midlands Province of Zimbabwe.

At birth, Mwazha was named Mamvura by his mother, Saramina. He was later renamed Paul in accordance with the Catholic tradition of assigning newly baptized children Christian name.

Mwazha was reportedly baptized by Father Schmidt, a German Roman Catholic missionary. Shortly after his birth, he became seriously ill with influenza and was presumed dead. This led to a rushed baptism, during which he was given the last rites before burial.

According to accounts from the African Apostolic Church, immediately after his baptism, Paul allegedly came back to life. Witnesses, including Father Schmidt and the gathered congregation, were said to be filled with the Holy Spirit and reportedly exclaimed in Shona, "Mwana amutsirwe basa, mwana amutsirwe basa, mwana amutsirwe basa," which loosely translates to 'the child has been raised for a mission.'

Mwazha began attending Roman Catholic Catechism classes at the age of 11. After completing his education at a Methodist Church school, he joined the Methodist Church and became a teacher.

== Mission ==
In 1953, Mwazha participated in a spiritual revival led by an evangelist group from the Methodist church. Interdenominational prayer sessions during this revival led to him forming the African Apostolic Church. His church is estimated to have over 7 million congregants. The African Apostolic Church has a dress code, and The Herald noted that he maintained a modest personal life for almost 56 years. He did not trim his beard, from the time he took a vow when he founded the church.

Devotees of the African Apostolic Church often call him NHUME or Mutumwa, meaning 'God's messenger'. He was consulted by elders in Zimbabwe to pray for a community that has suffered from a wave of murders and heinous crimes.

== Controversies ==
In 2020, members of the church took legal action against Mwazha's plans to name one of his sons, Bishop Alfred Mwazha, as the next leader of the church. The High Court nullified the appointment, and church representatives said they did not recognize actions taken by Bishop Alfred Mwazha in his purported capacity as head of the church.

== Personal life and death ==
Paul Mwazha was married to Joyce Makaonesu Mwazha, who died of diabetes in April 2017, at the age of 79. They had seven children, sixteen grandchildren, and at least three great-grandchildren. Mwazha's sons are all bishops and part of the church's leadership.

Zimbabwe's main opposition leader, Nelson Chamisa, visited Mwazha's homestead in Harare to congratulate him on reaching 101 years of age in October 2019.

Mwazha died on 20 November 2025, at the age of 107.
