= 1985 Zimbabwean parliamentary election =

- 1–2 July 1985 (common roll); 27 June 1985 (white roll)

All 100 seats in the House of Assembly 51 seats needed for a majority
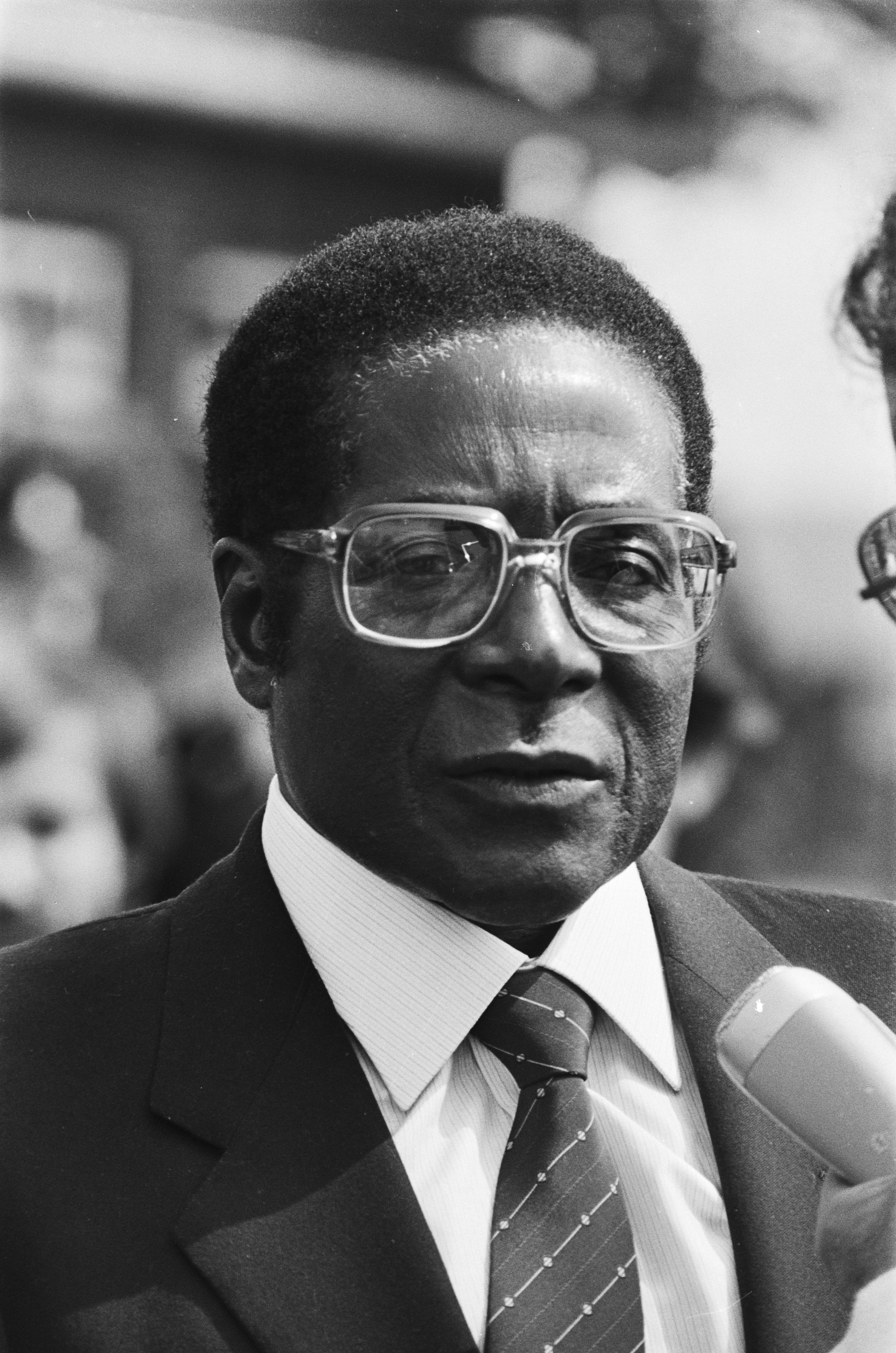

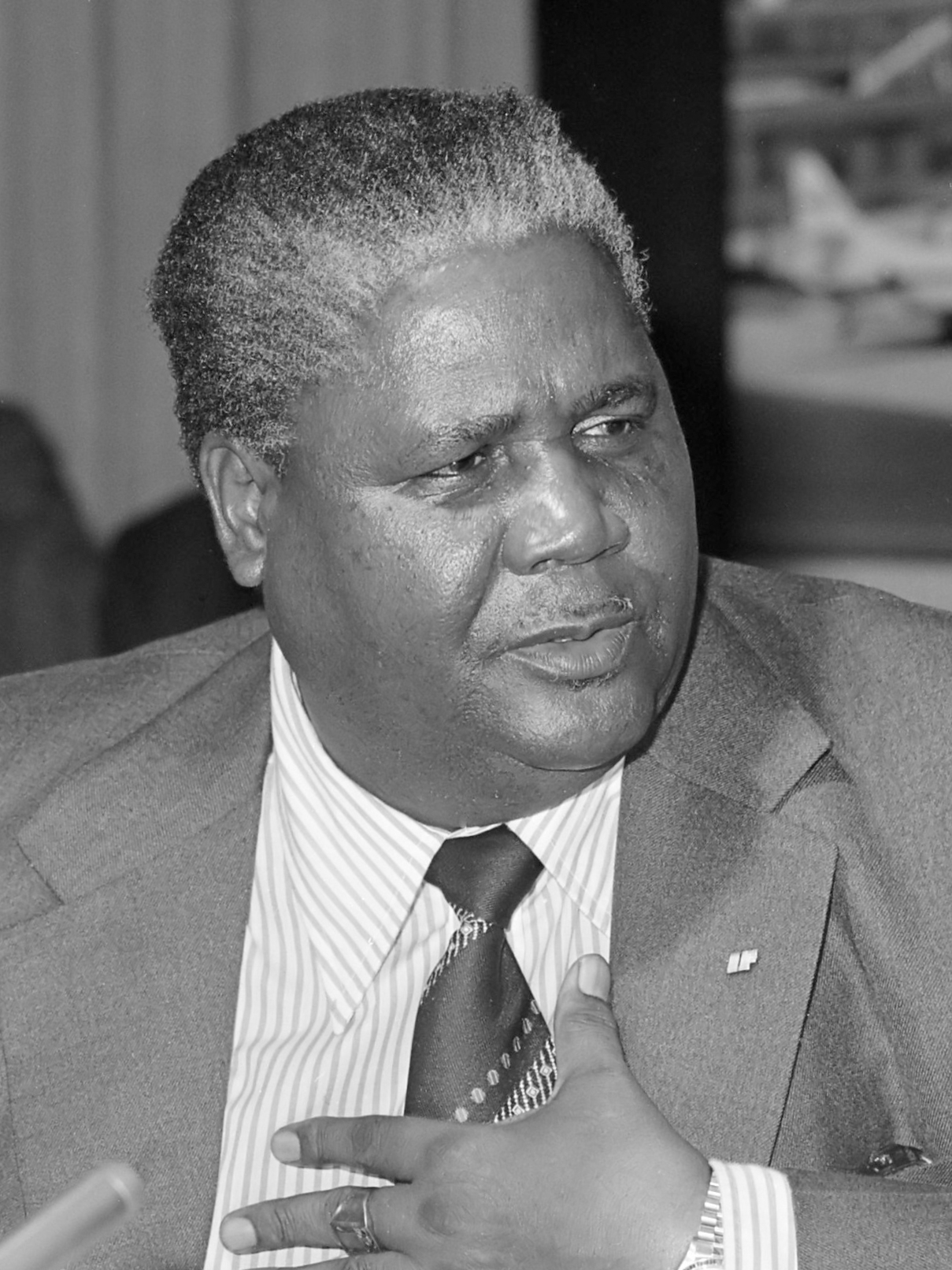

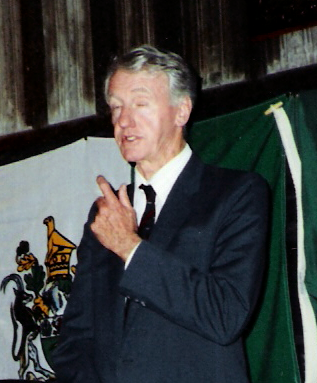
	First party	Second party	Third party
Leader	Robert Mugabe	Joshua Nkomo	Ian Smith
Party	ZANU–PF	ZAPU	CAZ
Last election	57	20	20
Seats won	64	15	15
Seat change	▲7	▼5	▼5
Popular vote	2,233,320	556,996	18,704 (Note: White roll)
Percentage	77.2%	19.3%	55.4%
Prime Minister before election
Robert Mugabe
ZANU–PF
Prime Minister-designate
Robert Mugabe
ZANU–PF

Parliamentary elections were held in Zimbabwe in June and July 1985. The result was a victory for the ruling ZANU–PF party led by Robert Mugabe, which increased its majority in parliament.

== Electoral system ==
The House of Assembly consisted of 100 seats, 20 of which were reserved for white voters, and the remaining 80 were elected on a 'common roll' consisting of all adult citizens except those on the white roll. Since Zimbabwean independence in 1980, an electoral roll for the common roll seats had been compiled. Single-member constituencies were drawn up for the common roll seats instead of election by lists in regions used in the 1980 elections. The common roll seats were elected on 1–2 July.

The white roll seats had been drawn up in 1978 but the large exodus of white Zimbabweans (especially from rural areas) had led to a wide disparity in electorate sizes. The Delimitation Commission therefore redrew the map and renamed many of the seats to match changes in place names. Another change to the system was that preferential voting was reinstituted for the white roll seats, so that a candidate had to win more than half of the votes (after transfers) to be elected. The white roll seats were elected on 27 June.

== Campaign ==
=== Common roll ===
The previous election had shown that ZANU (PF) had monopolised popular support among the Shona areas, and the chances of it losing the election were minimal. However, ZANU (PF) needed to affirm its support and demonstrate that it retained the confidence of the people that it was making genuine progress. Popular support for PF-ZAPU, outside the Ndebele areas, was minimal, and the United African National Council of Abel Muzorewa had lost support to ZANU (PF) following the effective transition into government of Robert Mugabe.

=== White roll ===
The white MPs in the previous Assembly, who had all started off as members of the Rhodesian Front (later renamed the Republican Front), had split over their reaction to the ZANU (PF) government with more than half resigning their membership in March 1982 to become Independents who partially supported ZANU (PF). Eventually, in April 1985, the Independent Zimbabwe Group was formed in preparation for the election. Generally, whites in Harare and Bulawayo had little complaint about the conduct of government, having seen minimal change in their lifestyles.

There was therefore a genuine contest in the Zimbabwean white community between the Conservative Alliance of Zimbabwe (the renamed Rhodesian Front), advocating strong defence of white interests, and the Independent Zimbabwe Group, advocating conciliation and partnership with ZANU (PF).

== Conduct ==
There was violence and Ndebele–Shona ethnic animosities during the elections.

== Results ==
Graph of the party split among 100 seats.
Party	Common roll			White roll			Total seats
Party	Votes	%	Seats	Votes	%	Seats	Total seats
ZANU–PF	2,233,320	77.19	64				64
ZAPU	558,771	19.31	15	311	0.91	0	15
United African National Council	64,764	2.24	0				0
ZANU–Ndonga	36,054	1.25	1				1
Conservative Alliance of Zimbabwe				18,731	55.02	15	15
Independent Zimbabwe Group				13,513	39.70	4	4
National Democratic Union	295	0.01	0				0
National Front of Zimbabwe	81	0.00	0				0
Independents				1,486	4.37	1	1
Total	2,893,285	100.00	80	34,041	100.00	20	100
Valid votes	2,893,285	97.35		34,041	95.21		
Invalid/blank votes	78,861	2.65		1,712	4.79		
Total votes	2,972,146	100.00		35,753	100.00		
Source: African Elections Database

=== By constituency ===
==== Common roll ====
Constituency	Candidate	Party	Votes	%
MANICALAND (11 seats)
BUHERA NORTH	Vundukai Kenneth Manyonda	ZANU (PF)	25,313	98.6
BUHERA NORTH	Stanford Chipfumbu	PF-ZAPU	224	0.9
BUHERA NORTH	Benedict Tokoyo	UANC	139	0.5
BUHERA SOUTH	Kumbirai Manyika Kangai	ZANU (PF)	34,397	98.4
BUHERA SOUTH	Misheck Pfende Mutongoreya	ZANU	376	1.1
BUHERA SOUTH	John Chirinda	PF-ZAPU	166	0.5
CHIMANIMANI	Simon Musutani Sithole	ZANU (PF)	34,733	76.7
CHIMANIMANI	Maziwanza Nason Tinarwo	ZANU	9,742	21.5
CHIMANIMANI	Oscar Tashora Mandipaza	PF-ZAPU	803	1.8
CHIPINGE	Goodson Guhu Mushakaanhu Sithole	ZANU	16,461	50.0
CHIPINGE	William Hlebeni Ndangana	ZANU (PF)	15,625	47.5
CHIPINGE	Benjamin Sibiya	PF-ZAPU	838	2.5
MAKONI EAST	Naomi Pasiharigutwi Nhiwatiwa	ZANU (PF)	51,772	96.7
MAKONI EAST	Peter Gumindega Maenzanise	UANC	1,084	2.0
MAKONI EAST	Benjamin Zindoga	PF-ZAPU	493	0.9
MAKONI EAST	Amon Zwingowaniseyi	ZANU	187	0.3
MAKONI WEST	Moven Enock Mahachi	ZANU (PF)	20,203	95.7
MAKONI WEST	Langton Farisayi Charidza	UANC	584	2.8
MAKONI WEST	Muzadzi Tinarwo Tamwaramwa	PF-ZAPU	196	0.9
MAKONI WEST	Davidson Jahwi	ZANU	132	0.6
MUTARE EAST	Lazarus Gumisai Chauyachauya Nzarayebani	ZANU (PF)	33,868	94.6
MUTARE EAST	Morgan Masiyamhuru	UANC	1,094	3.1
MUTARE EAST	Michael Tarisayi Ruswa	PF-ZAPU	425	1.2
MUTARE EAST	Mwabvira Arnold Sawana	ZANU	407	1.1
MUTARE URBAN	Edgar Ziwinayi Tekere	ZANU (PF)	30,076	83.3
MUTARE URBAN	Kagoro Felix Kadzombe	UANC	3,694	10.2
MUTARE URBAN	Ford Magada	PF-ZAPU	1,178	3.3
MUTARE URBAN	David Mungunyana	ZANU	1,150	3.2
MUTARE WEST	Moton Dizzy Paul Malianga	ZANU (PF)	28,551	96.4
MUTARE WEST	Webster Chamuda Mufambi Zimunya	UANC	784	2.6
MUTARE WEST	Matthew Masiyakurima	PF-ZAPU	143	0.5
MUTARE WEST	David Musiyagamu Ngarize	ZANU	136	0.5
MUTASA	Victoria Fikile Chitepo	ZANU (PF)	28,529	94.0
MUTASA	King Itai David Mutasa	UANC	1,555	5.1
MUTASA	Misheck Tenia Samuel Chinamasa	PF-ZAPU	273	0.9
NYANGA	Chimbidzayi Ezekiel Caleb Sanyangare	ZANU (PF)	34,223	96.9
NYANGA	Paraitanga Samson Chatsama	PF-ZAPU	592	1.7
NYANGA	Noel Gabriel Mukono	UANC	498	1.4
MASHONALAND CENTRAL (5 seats)
BINDURA/SHAMVA	Joice Teurai Ropa Nhongo	ZANU (PF)	42,822	98.3
BINDURA/SHAMVA	Arthur Muchena	PF-ZAPU	415	1.0
BINDURA/SHAMVA	Ishmael Chemael Stephen Hajabu	UANC	344	0.8
DARWIN	Musanhu George Peter Clever Wilfred Rutanhira	ZANU (PF)	23,022	98.5
DARWIN	Frank Rwanga	PF-ZAPU	236	1.0
DARWIN	Timothy Mukwengwe Mufunga	ZANU	110	0.5
GURUVE	Rackson Shasha Dizha Mucheki	ZANU (PF)	39,556	98.2
GURUVE	Msandaira Jairos Mufurusa	UANC	453	1.1
GURUVE	Mudavanhu John Gatsi	PF-ZAPU	273	0.7
MAZOWE	Chenhamo Chakezha Chimutengwende	ZANU (PF)	46,556	98.0
MAZOWE	Henry Mhandu	UANC	449	0.9
MAZOWE	Jacob Machingauta Mhandu	PF-ZAPU	380	0.8
MAZOWE	Baldwin Murape Muchenje	ZANU	101	0.2
RUSHINGA	Paddington Zvorwadza	ZANU (PF)	47,213	98.7
RUSHINGA	Naison Kakomwe	UANC	368	0.8
RUSHINGA	Potenky Chikaka Takundwa	PF-ZAPU	251	0.5
MASHONALAND EAST (18 seats)
CHINAMORA	Herbert Sylvester Masiyiwa Ushewokunze	ZANU (PF)	43,880	95.8
CHINAMORA	Kenneth George Bopoto-Ngwerume	PF-ZAPU	1,105	2.4
CHINAMORA	Pendeka Stanlake Nyadudya	UANC	799	1.7
CHITUNGWIZA	Witness Pasichigare Magunda Mangwende	ZANU (PF)	37,434	90.6
CHITUNGWIZA	Claver Cliff Takawira Manhombo	UANC	2,686	6.5
CHITUNGWIZA	Oziah Muchuchu	PF-ZAPU	888	2.1
CHITUNGWIZA	Fakazani Nelson Mabvuu	ZANU	247	0.6
CHITUNGWIZA	Mark Muchabaiwa	NDU	52	0.1
DZIVARASEKWA	Tapfumaneyi Maurice Nyagumbo	ZANU (PF)	44,277	89.2
DZIVARASEKWA	Simon Tagarira Chauruka	PF-ZAPU	2,670	5.4
DZIVARASEKWA	Raymond Chikarara Nyaude Madzima	UANC	2,594	5.2
DZIVARASEKWA	Finlay Banda	NDU	95	0.2
GLEN VIEW	Idah Mashonganyika	ZANU (PF)	31,506	88.5
GLEN VIEW	Abel Tendekayi Muzorewa	UANC	2,876	8.1
GLEN VIEW	Felix Magalela Mafa Sibanda	PF-ZAPU	838	2.4
GLEN VIEW	Elton Zinduku Pamberi	ZANU	400	1.1
GOROMONZI	Kenneth Bute	ZANU (PF)	28,873	96.7
GOROMONZI	Thomas Tapa	UANC	569	1.9
GOROMONZI	Solomon Pfakacha Gundo Mabika	PF-ZAPU	427	1.4
HARARE	Bernard Thomas Chidzero	ZANU (PF)	39,180	88.4
HARARE	Nevison Chakaipa Mukanganga Nyashanu	PF-ZAPU	2,625	5.9
HARARE	Ferris Simon Tandari Mushonga	UANC	2,172	4.9
HARARE	Mabaudi Wiseman Zengeni	ZANU	268	0.6
HARARE	James Clever Mavunga Shereni	NFZ	50	0.1
HARARE	Abednigo Munyamana Gwavu	NDU	39	0.1
HIGHFIELD	Robert Gabriel Mugabe	ZANU (PF)	33,548	84.2
HIGHFIELD	William Chadzukwa Madziwa	UANC	3,885	9.7
HIGHFIELD	Ruth Lottie Nomondo Chinamano	PF-ZAPU	2,360	5.9
HIGHFIELD	Peter Munyaradzi Mandaza	NFZ	31	0.1
HIGHFIELD	Xavier Chihota	NDU	30	0.1
HIGHFIELD	Enock Bonyongwe	ZANU	disq.	-
Manyame	Robert Mubayiwa Marere	ZANU (PF)	32,971	89.3
Manyame	Zarous Takapera	UANC	2,388	6.5
Manyame	Takaruza Nyakudya	PF-ZAPU	1,242	3.4
Manyame	Alice Marange	ZANU	301	0.8
MARONDERA	Sydney Tigere Sekeremayi	ZANU (PF)	30,822	96.6
MARONDERA	Joseph Tawonerwi Charumbira	UANC	679	2.1
MARONDERA	Taderera Chimurenga Maingehama	PF-ZAPU	414	1.3
MBARE	Edward Munatsireyi Pswarayi	ZANU (PF)	31,112	88.7
MBARE	Robert Manuel Marowa	UANC	2,765	7.9
MBARE	Denga Haven Hunda	PF-ZAPU	902	2.6
MBARE	Idah Gaga Mazani	ZANU	254	0.7
MBARE	Rosten Gore	NDU	37	0.1
MUDZI	Abraham Kabasa	ZANU (PF)	30,290	93.5
MUDZI	Justin Chibundu Gutuza	UANC	1,726	5.3
MUDZI	Nicholas Mtero Mhlambi	PF-ZAPU	267	0.8
MUDZI	Tennyson Tennis Shereni Magura	ZANU	101	0.3
MUFAKOSE	John Zhakata	ZANU (PF)	36,875	85.1
MUFAKOSE	Edward Stewart Mazaiwana	UANC	4,136	9.5
MUFAKOSE	Anthony Masawi	PF-ZAPU	2,342	5.4
MUKUVUSI	Amos Bernard Muvengwa Midzi	ZANU (PF)	41,200	87.3
MUKUVUSI	David Charles Zvinaiye Mukome	UANC	3,587	7.6
MUKUVUSI	Sottayi Tapfumaneyi Davidson Katsere	PF-ZAPU	2,136	4.5
MUKUVUSI	James Noah Chitungo	ZANU	295	0.6
MUREWA NORTH	Rudo Shalom Peace Mungwashu	ZANU (PF)	43,175	99.0
MUREWA NORTH	Adah Murape	PF-ZAPU	422	1.0
MUREWA SOUTH	Ishemunyoro Godi Karimanzira	ZANU (PF)	28,997	98.1
MUREWA SOUTH	Mujuru Josiah Banhamombe	UANC	350	1.2
MUREWA SOUTH	Johannes Munuwepayi Mangwende	PF-ZAPU	213	0.7
MUTOKO	Richard Baradza Sygnah Katsande	ZANU (PF)	23,995	98.4
MUTOKO	Emmie Ncube	UANC	271	1.1
MUTOKO	Reginald Nyamadzaro Karumazondo	PF-ZAPU	126	0.5
WEDZA	Joseph Muchineripi Jekanyika	ZANU (PF)	32,153	98.2
WEDZA	Beki Dickson Mandizvidza	UANC	412	1.3
WEDZA	Muchabaiwa Dzvokora	PF-ZAPU	189	0.6
ZENGEZA	John Madzinga	ZANU (PF)	37,240	92.5
ZENGEZA	Tonderayi Peter Chitengu	UANC	1,894	4.7
ZENGEZA	Elkanah Ben Tjuma	PF-ZAPU	969	2.4
ZENGEZA	Elias Nyandoro	ZANU	136	0.3
ZENGEZA	Shepherd Gurupira	NDU	42	0.1
MASHONALAND WEST (8 seats)
CHEGUTU EAST	Mudzingwa Noah Kadenhe	ZANU (PF)	41,459	95.7
CHEGUTU EAST	Titus Garikayi Mukarati	UANC	1,159	2.7
CHEGUTU EAST	Loveless Madiye	PF-ZAPU	718	1.7
CHEGUTU WEST	Enos Chamunorwa Chikowore	ZANU (PF)	28,153	91.1
CHEGUTU WEST	Chinyauro Abraham	PF-ZAPU	1,966	6.4
CHEGUTU WEST	Abraham Chirwa	UANC	796	2.6
KADOMA	Charles Ndhlovu	ZANU (PF)	20,746	95.1
KADOMA	Elijah Mketwa Moyo	PF-ZAPU	675	3.1
KADOMA	Kashamadzo Maxwell Machingambi	UANC	305	1.4
KADOMA	Tichataura James Mudzimba	ZANU	82	0.4
KARIBA	Stone Chakabvapasi	UANC	Election postponed due to the death of Robson Dayford Manyika	
KARIBA	Johnson Gumpo	PF-ZAPU	Election postponed due to the death of Robson Dayford Manyika	
KARIBA	Robson Dayford Manyika	ZANU (PF)	Election postponed due to the death of Robson Dayford Manyika	
KAROI	Edgar Mapiye Kwenda	ZANU (PF)	26,853	92.8
KAROI	Joram Rwapedza Makaranga	UANC	1,325	4.6
KAROI	Erison Dendera	PF-ZAPU	751	2.6
MAKONDE EAST	Sabina Gabriel Mugabe	ZANU (PF)	54,599	96.4
MAKONDE EAST	Kenneth Madzvanya Mano	PF-ZAPU	1,395	2.5
MAKONDE EAST	Josiah Zinhanga Mudzengi	UANC	660	1.2
MAKONDE NORTH	Swithun Tachiona Mombeshora	ZANU (PF)	22,473	92.3
MAKONDE NORTH	Kimpton Masango	PF-ZAPU	1,222	5.0
MAKONDE NORTH	Isaac Gwanzura Shumba	UANC	640	2.6
MAKONDE WEST	Nathan Marwirakuwa Shamuyarira	ZANU (PF)	43,920	93.7
MAKONDE WEST	Kiliyoni Songe Babuyile	PF-ZAPU	1,718	3.7
MAKONDE WEST	Dube Willie Marumahoko	UANC	988	2.1
MAKONDE WEST	Peter Mombeshora	ZANU	252	0.5
MASVINGO (11 seats)
BIKITA	Gabriel Mharadze Machinga	ZANU (PF)	38,806	99.1
BIKITA	David Kufakunesu Chikukutu	ZANU	203	0.5
BIKITA	John Mushava	PF-ZAPU	144	0.4
CHIREDZI NORTH	Henry Hebert Pote	ZANU (PF)	42,287	97.5
CHIREDZI NORTH	Stephen Maseko	PF-ZAPU	634	1.5
CHIREDZI NORTH	West Zimuto	ZANU	436	1.0
CHIREDZI SOUTH	Titus Hatlani Maluleka	ZANU (PF)	33,778	91.1
CHIREDZI SOUTH	Titos Risenga Chauke	PF-ZAPU	2,711	7.3
CHIREDZI SOUTH	Helani Aaron Jack Mapulange Hobwana	ZANU	597	1.6
CHIVI	Josaya Dunira Hungwe	ZANU (PF)	22,208	99.5
CHIVI	Chinatsira Jonas Zvovurere	PF-ZAPU	83	0.4
CHIVI	Edward Goko Watungwa	ZANU	19	0.1
GUTU NORTH	Oliver Musa Munyaradzi	ZANU (PF)	30,957	99.8
GUTU NORTH	Julia Vimbani	PF-ZAPU	53	0.2
GUTU SOUTH	Shuvai Mahofa	ZANU (PF)	35,685	99.5
GUTU SOUTH	Jainos Kufakunesu Mutazu	PF-ZAPU	175	0.5
MASVINGO NORTH	Dzingai Mutumbuka	ZANU (PF)	53,438	97.4
MASVINGO NORTH	Aaron Betserai Honye	PF-ZAPU	1,150	2.1
MASVINGO NORTH	Leonard Mhangarai Ringisai Nyemba	ZANU	283	0.5
MASVINGO SOUTH	Eddison Jonas Mudadirwa Zvobgo	ZANU (PF)	42,672	99.3
MASVINGO SOUTH	Jemitias Hungwe Matende	PF-ZAPU	291	0.7
MWENEZI	Justin Murebwa Machava	ZANU (PF)	26,897	95.9
MWENEZI	Simon Zinyoka Moyo	PF-ZAPU	1,140	4.1
NDANGA EAST	Simbi Veke Mubako	ZANU (PF)	27,795	99.5
NDANGA EAST	Hundson Negro Dope	PF-ZAPU	130	0.5
NDANGA/ZIMUTO	Mayor Urimbo	ZANU (PF)	32,319	99.7
NDANGA/ZIMUTO	Peter Matumbike	PF-ZAPU	105	0.3
MATABELELAND NORTH (9 seats)
BINGA	Francis Munkombwe	PF-ZAPU	38,879	90.5
BINGA	Jacob Francis Mudenda	ZANU (PF)	3,414	7.9
BINGA	Josephat Mdzingwa	UANC	660	1.5
BULAWAYO	Lot Sitshebo Senda	PF-ZAPU	26,710	63.8
BULAWAYO	Amina Huges	ZANU (PF)	13,537	32.3
BULAWAYO	Gladys Tiriboyi	UANC	1,387	3.3
BULAWAYO	Phineas Toreveti Murefu	ZANU	253	0.6
HWANGE/TSHOLOTSHO	David Joseph Mfanyana Kwidini	PF-ZAPU	29,538	83.3
HWANGE/TSHOLOTSHO	Obert Moses Mpofu	ZANU (PF)	5,926	16.7
LUPANE	Micah Mahamba Bhebe	PF-ZAPU	30,523	97.4
LUPANE	Selina Maria West	ZANU (PF)	825	2.6
MAGWEGWE	Joshua Mqabuko Nkomo	PF-ZAPU	32,141	81.8
MAGWEGWE	Reuben Mutambarinwa Zemura	ZANU (PF)	6,483	16.5
MAGWEGWE	Morgan Kugaraunzwana Machiya	UANC	682	1.7
MPOPOMA	Sydney Donald Malunga	PF-ZAPU	37,089	73.3
MPOPOMA	Josias Chirongo Chidyamakono	ZANU (PF)	11,163	22.1
MPOPOMA	Walter Nqabeni Mthimkhulu	UANC	2,068	4.1
MPOPOMA	Nason Tenene	ZANU	256	0.5
NKAYI	Welshman Mabhena	PF-ZAPU	25,874	95.8
NKAYI	Samsom Msindo Ndebele	ZANU (PF)	760	2.8
NKAYI	Solomon Tongani	UANC	366	1.4
NYAMANDHLOVU	John Landa Nkomo	PF-ZAPU	36,098	85.8
NYAMANDHLOVU	Shadreck Fortrixon Ndlovu	ZANU (PF)	4,679	11.1
NYAMANDHLOVU	Christopher Fumirai Mariga	UANC	1,044	2.5
NYAMANDHLOVU	Enock Musiyandaka	ZANU	234	0.6
PELANDABA	Joseph Wilfred Msika	PF-ZAPU	28,201	81.2
PELANDABA	Amanda Ntuli	ZANU (PF)	5,361	15.4
PELANDABA	Kefas Isaac Muchenje	UANC	991	2.9
PELANDABA	Zachariah Tongai Chigumira	ZANU	178	0.5
MATABELELAND SOUTH (6 members)
BEITBRIDGE	Kembo Mohadi	PF-ZAPU	13,680	56.6
BEITBRIDGE	John Masole Mbedgi	ZANU (PF)	10,476	43.4
BULALIMA/MANGWE	Isaac Lentswi Nyathi	PF-ZAPU	31,334	96.4
BULALIMA/MANGWE	Callistus Dingiswayo Ndlovu	ZANU (PF)	923	2.8
BULALIMA/MANGWE	Egpher Muhlauri	UANC	259	0.8
GWANDA	Edward Ndlovu	PF-ZAPU	21,798	92.8
GWANDA	Aleck Ndlovu	ZANU (PF)	1,684	7.2
INSIZA	Naison Khutshwekhaya Kwidini	PF-ZAPU	27,804	89.1
INSIZA	Enos Muzombi Nkala	ZANU (PF)	3,392	10.9
MATOBO	Stephen Jeqe Nyongolo Nkomo	PF-ZAPU	32,045	89.6
MATOBO	Jitile Gibbious Hindoga Dube	ZANU (PF)	3,000	8.4
MATOBO	Abraham Mazwi Khumalo	UANC	724	2.0
MZINGWANE	Thenjiwe Virginia Lesabe	PF-ZAPU	33,509	86.7
MZINGWANE	Joshua Maqwala Masilela	ZANU (PF)	5,128	13.3
MIDLANDS (12 seats)
CHARTER EAST	Ernest Rusununguko Kadungure	ZANU (PF)	34,276	98.8
CHARTER EAST	Edson Muzanenhamo Mutsinze	UANC	271	0.8
CHARTER EAST	Abednego Dan Njawaya	PF-ZAPU	159	0.5
CHIRUMANZU	Frederick Musiiwa Makamure Shava	ZANU (PF)	29,197	98.3
CHIRUMANZU	Dzingirayi Munodawafa	UANC	268	0.9
CHIRUMANZU	Samson Hlanga Mpanduki	PF-ZAPU	252	0.8
GOKWE EAST	Byron Reuben Mtonhodzi Hove	ZANU (PF)	32,354	79.6
GOKWE EAST	Mabasa Edward Chilimanzi	PF-ZAPU	6,796	16.7
GOKWE EAST	Edson Mzite	UANC	1,485	3.7
GOKWE WEST	Jesiniahs Dick Makanganise	ZANU (PF)	32,354	79.6
GOKWE WEST	Kesia Madzorera	PF-ZAPU	6,796	16.7
GOKWE WEST	Jackson John Manyoka	UANC	1,485	3.7
GWERU DISTRICT	Ernest Simbarashe Tongogara	ZANU (PF)	21,293	58.2
GWERU DISTRICT	William Henry Kona	PF-ZAPU	14,194	38.8
GWERU DISTRICT	Raphel Gondo	UANC	902	2.5
GWERU DISTRICT	Charles Rumhembe	ZANU	181	0.5
GWERU URBAN	Simon Vengayi Muzenda	ZANU (PF)	25,532	80.8
GWERU URBAN	Sophia Agamemnonos	PF-ZAPU	5,708	18.1
GWERU URBAN	Sylvester Bernard Kutesera Mutasa	UANC	1,106	3.5
GWERU URBAN	Mark Mfenei Mavhure	ZANU	262	0.8
KWEKWE EAST	Emmerson Dambudzo Mnangagwa	ZANU (PF)	37,017	86.0
KWEKWE EAST	Elias Hananda	PF-ZAPU	4,733	11.0
KWEKWE EAST	Kenneth Kumbirayi Kaparepare	UANC	1,313	3.0
KWEKWE WEST	Josiah Tavagwisa Chinyati	ZANU (PF)	18,600	50.6
KWEKWE WEST	Stephen Kenneth Sesulelo Vuma	PF-ZAPU	17,257	46.9
KWEKWE WEST	Luckson Chando Mugara	UANC	766	2.1
KWEKWE WEST	Samuel Maara	ZANU	150	0.4
MBERENGWA NORTH	Richard Chemist Hove	ZANU (PF)	33,897	97.2
MBERENGWA NORTH	Solomon Mtinsi	PF-ZAPU	868	2.5
MBERENGWA NORTH	Laimon Mukosi	UANC	120	0.3
MBERENGWA SOUTH	Ben Ndiringe Mataga	ZANU (PF)	27,554	88.4
MBERENGWA SOUTH	Norman Mabena	PF-ZAPU	3,631	11.6
SHURUGWI	Simbarashe Simbanenduku Mumbegegwi	ZANU (PF)	26,242	97.5
SHURUGWI	Misheck Machonisa	PF-ZAPU	490	1.8
SHURUGWI	Stanley Mupeti	UANC	183	0.7
ZVISHAVANE	Julia Tukai Zvobgo	ZANU (PF)	26,152	91.8
ZVISHAVANE	Lydia Dhlamini	UANC	2,111	7.4
ZVISHAVANE	Mzondiwa Dube	PF-ZAPU	233	0.8

==== White roll ====
Constituency	Candidate	Party	Votes	%
AVONDALE	John Alfred Landau	IZG	883	50.4
AVONDALE	Terence Michael Oatt	CAZ	870	49.6
BORROWDALE	Anthony Read	IZG	1,004	62.5
BORROWDALE	John Ronald Probert	CAZ	603	37.5
BULAWAYO CENTRAL	Ian Douglas Smith	CAZ	1,441	72.4
BULAWAYO CENTRAL	Patrick Francis Shields	IZG	548	27.6
BULAWAYO NORTH	Guybon Cumming	CAZ	1,330	72.1
BULAWAYO NORTH	Esmay Dorothy Scott	IZG	515	27.9
BULAWAYO SOUTH	Graham Austen Biffen	CAZ	1,354	74.9
BULAWAYO SOUTH	Dr Robert Graeme Nixon	IZG	454	25.1
CENTRAL	Antonius Frans Berkhout	CAZ	1,111	76.6
CENTRAL	Frank George Capon	IZG	339	23.4
EASTERN	Desmond Butler	CAZ	1,107	61.9
EASTERN	David Gerald Meikle	IZG	680	38.1
HATFIELD	Dennis Evan Johnson	CAZ	716	46.6
HATFIELD	Richard Cartwright	IZG	400	26.0
HATFIELD	Herbert Joseph Thompson Foya	Ind	337	21.9
HATFIELD	John Warner Jarman	Ind	84	5.5
HATFIELD	Second count			
HATFIELD	Dennis Evan Johnson	CAZ	721	49.2
HATFIELD	Richard Cartwright	IZG	406	27.7
HATFIELD	Herbert Joseph Thompson Foya	Ind	339	23.1
HATFIELD	John Warner Jarman	Ind	–	–
HATFIELD	Third count			
HATFIELD	Dennis Evan Johnson	CAZ	729	63.8
HATFIELD	Richard Cartwright	IZG	414	36.2
HATFIELD	Herbert Joseph Thompson Foya	Ind	–	–
HATFIELD	John Warner Jarman	Ind	–	–
HIGHLANDS	Charles William Duke	CAZ	913	49.5
HIGHLANDS	Peter Arnold Naudé	IZG	702	38.1
HIGHLANDS	Danial Ronald Meyer	Ind	228	12.4
HIGHLANDS	Second count			
HIGHLANDS	Charles William Duke	CAZ	924	56.0
HIGHLANDS	Peter Arnold Naudé	IZG	727	44.0
HIGHLANDS	Danial Ronald Meyer	Ind	–	–
KADOMA-CHEGUTU	Gerald Christopher Smith	CAZ	849	50.1
KADOMA-CHEGUTU	George Alfred Pio	IZG	847	49.9
KOPJE	Shaw Dyson	CAZ	753	56.7
KOPJE	Dennis Divaris	IZG	574	43.3
MAKONI	John Maurice Kay	IZG	707	51.8
MAKONI	Shelagh Gertrude Van Reenen	CAZ	658	48.2
MARLBOROUGH	William Michie Irvine	IZG	1,070	56.8
MARLBOROUGH	James Keith Borrows	CAZ	813	43.2
MAZOWE-MUTOKO	Mark Henry Heathcote Partridge	CAZ	793	46.4
MAZOWE-MUTOKO	William Douglas Christopher Reed	IZG	768	45.0
MAZOWE-MUTOKO	André Sothern Holland	Ind	147	8.6
MAZOWE-MUTOKO	Second count			
MAZOWE-MUTOKO	Mark Henry Heathcote Partridge	CAZ	796	50.2
MAZOWE-MUTOKO	William Douglas Christopher Reed	IZG	789	49.8
MAZOWE-MUTOKO	André Sothern Holland	Ind	–	–
MIDLANDS	Cyril Vernon Crofts Tapson	CAZ	814	54.5
MIDLANDS	Henry Swan Elsworth	IZG	679	45.5
MOUNT PLEASANT	Jonas Christian Andersen	Ind	1,017	50.2
MOUNT PLEASANT	Pieter Kenyon Fleming-Voltelyn van der Byl	CAZ	544	26.8
MOUNT PLEASANT	Raymond Alexander Lindsay Grant	IZG	466	23.0
NORTHERN	Bertram Ankers	CAZ	912	56.9
NORTHERN	Esmond Meryl Micklem	IZG	692	43.1
RUNDE	Johan Christiaan Adriaan Welman	CAZ	994	64.8
RUNDE	Peter John Field	IZG	540	35.2
SOUTHERN	David Clive Mitchell	CAZ	1,130	66.4
SOUTHERN	Max Rosenfels	IZG	573	33.6
WESTERN	Stephen Andrew Locke	CAZ	999	56.3
WESTERN	Robert Arnold Farley	IZG	371	20.9
WESTERN	Lonley Lolley Seckel	PF-ZAPU	311	17.5
WESTERN	Aaron Michael Milner	Ind	61	3.4
WESTERN	Lawrence Alastair Bronson	Ind	33	1.9

== Changes during the Assembly ==
In the delayed poll in Kariba constituency, two candidates were nominated: Kenneth Madzvanya Mano (PF-ZAPU) and Enos Mzombi Nkala (ZANU (PF)). Nkala subsequently withdrew, although a poll was required (it took place on 5–7 July) and Mano was declared elected.

Charles Duke (CAZ, Highlands) joined ZANU (PF) in June 1986.

Ian Smith (CAZ, Bulawayo Central) was suspended from the Assembly for one year on 2 April 1987 over statements he had made in South Africa which were critical of the Mugabe government.

Three members elected from the white roll constituencies joined ZANU (PF) on 28 July 1987. They were John Landau (IZG, Avondale), Jock Kay (IZG, Makoni), and Tony Read (Ind, Borrowdale).

In September 1987, having achieved the support of 75% of the House of Assembly as required under the Lancaster House Agreement, the constitution was amended to abolish the white roll constituencies. Twenty further members (including many of the former white MPs who were supportive of ZANU (PF)) were co-opted into the House of Assembly to replace them.
