= CCJS =

CCJs or CCJS may stand for:

- Cornway College a private, co-educational, day and boarding school in Zimbabwe.
- Council of Christians and Jews
- County Court judgments
