= Takawira Rural District Council =

Rural local authority

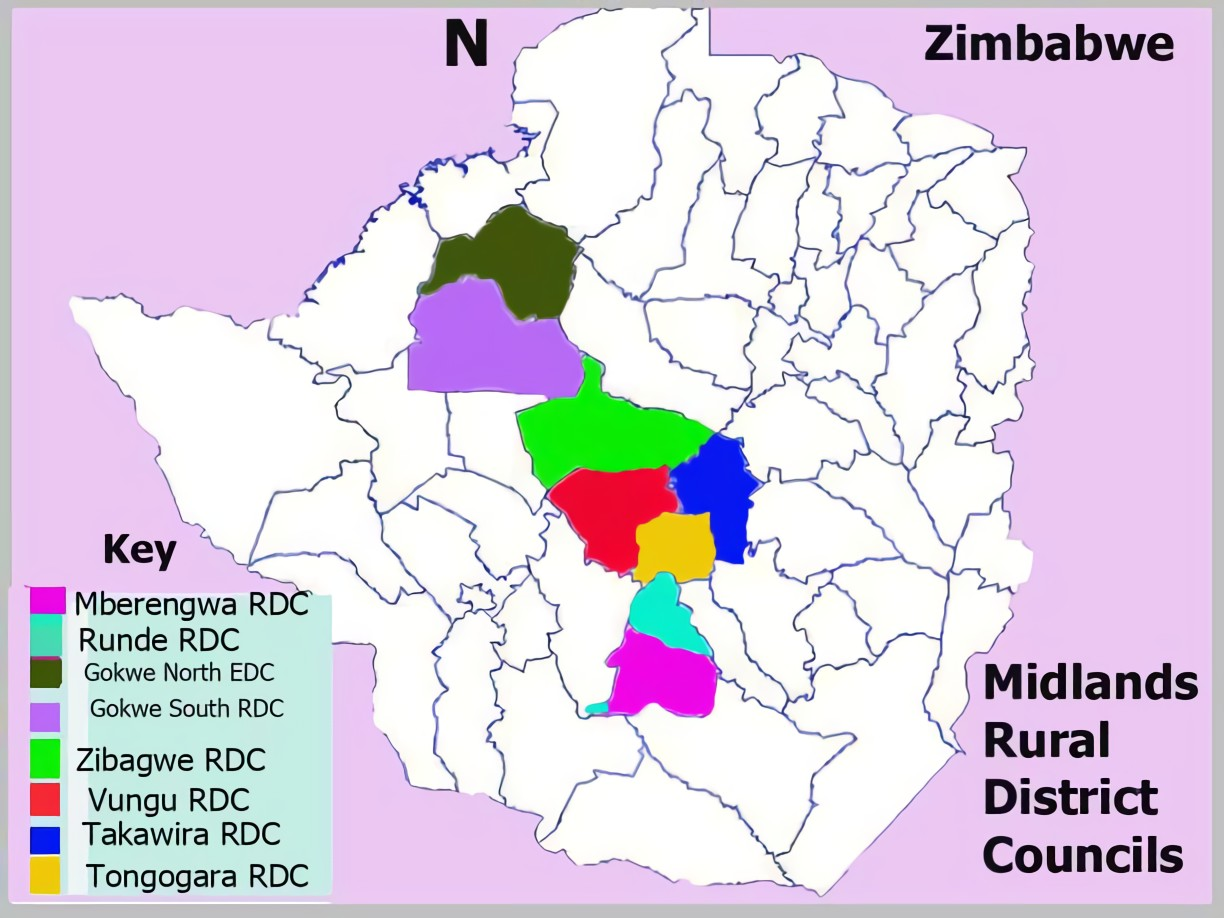
Midlands RDCs

Takawira Rural District Council is rural local authority created under the Rural District Councils Act Chapter 29.13 as provided by the constitution. It is bestowed with wide ranging administrative and legislative powers over their respective jurisdictions through this Act.

It is Chirumhanzu Rural District authority. Chirumhanzu District is rural with Mvuma being the only urban setup in the District.

== Background ==
Chirumanzu Rural District Council was established through Proclamation No. 1 of 1993 which amalgamated Takawira District Council and Charter Rural Council and established new boundaries for the district.

Chirumhanzu Rural District Council has the communal area, the resettlement area and three urban areas, Mvuma, Lalapanzi and Charandura under its jurisdiction.

The three urbanized centers do not have town councils. Instead Chirumhanzu RDC now officially called Takawira RDC has set committees to run the three centers;

- Mvuma Area Committee;

Lalapanzi Area Committee;

Charandura Area Committee.

The district comprises twenty five wards; that is 12 in the communal area, 3 in Mvuma, 1 in Lalapanzi and 9 in resettlement areas.

== Operations ==
Takawira RDC comprises Chirumanzu Constituency and the greater part of Chirumanzu-Zibagwe Constituency.

Chirumanzu Cinstituency covers 13 wards 1, 2, 3, 4, 5, 6, 7, 8, 9, 10,21, 23 and 25. Chirumanzu-Zibagwe Constituency covers twelve of Takawira RDC wards; 11, 12, 13, 14, 15, 16, 17, 18, 19, 20, 22 and 24. However Chirumanzu-Zibagwe Constituency overlaps into Kwekwe Rural District Council taking wards 1, 2 and 31, these include Marivale, Sebakwe Recreational and Munyati respectively. These 3 wards were previously in Zhombe Constituency.

== 2013 - 2018 Councillors ==
Ward	Councilor (Alt.)	Gender	Affiliated to	Constituency
#01	Peter C Chinguruve	m	Zanu-PF	Chirumanzu
#02	Marco V Masocha	m	Zanu-PF	Chirumanzu
#03	David P Windizi	m	Zanu-PF	Chirumanzu
#04	Clyphos Matizira	m	Zanu-PF	Chirumanzu
#05	Veronica Duve	f	Zanu-PF	Chirumanzu
#06	Johannes Kohli	m	Zanu-PF	Chirumanzu
#07	Duvai Taruvinga	m	Zanu-PF	Chirumanzu
#08	Tirivanhu L Mhazo	m	Zanu-PF	Chirumanzu
#09	Zvenyika Makanda	m	Zanu-PF	Chirumanzu
#10	Lucy Paradza	f	Zanu-PF	Chirumanzu
#11	Gabriel Mavezera	m	Zanu-PF	Chirumanzu-Zibagwe
#12	Joseph Gwarazimba	m	Zanu-PF	Chirumanzu-Zibagwe
#13	Tremendous Musaea	m	Zanu-PF	Chirumanzu-Zibagwe
#14	Tendai Mandioopera	f	Zanu-PF	Chirumanzu-Zibagwe
#15	Raphael Mapete	m	Zanu-PF	Chirumanzu-Zibagwe
#16	Thomas D Masora	m	Zanu-PF	Chirumanzu-Zibagwe
#17	Richard Muzenda	m	Zanu-PF	Chirumanzu-Zibagwe
#18	Paul Mnangagwa	m	Zanu-PF	Chirumanzu-Zibagwe
#19	Tafiraje Mutimba	m	Zanu-PF	Chirumanzu-Zibagwe
#20	Thomas Chisadza	m	Zanu-PF	Chirumanzu-Zibagwe
#21	Norman T Mureriwa	m	Zanu-PF	Chirumanzu
#22	Tapera Dzitirai	m	Zanu-PF	Chirumanzu-Zibagwe
#23	Simon Mafuwa	m	Zanu-PF	Chirumanzu
#24	Irene Girimu	m	Zanu-PF	Chirumanzu-Zibagwe
#25	Jairos Turika	m	Zanu-PF	Chirumanzu

== 2008 - 2013 Councillors ==
Winners of the 2008 Local Authorities election.

Ward	Councilor (Alt.)	Gender	Affiliated to	Constituency
#02	Matambo Vivian Vimbayi	m	Mdc-T	Chirumanzu
#03	Nhigo George Chenjerayi	m	Mdv-T	Chirumanzu
#05	Muzira Aquilina Tapudza	m	Mdc-T	Chirumanzu
#06	Mapurisa Siphelani	m	Mdc-T	Chirumanzu
#08	Mhazo Tirivanhu Lawrence	m	Zanu-PF	Chirumanzu
#09	Mushaike Hitler Regis	m	Mdc-T	Chirumanzu
#10	Paradza Lucy	f	Zanu-PF	Chirumanzu
#15	Chiunye Gilbert Gidds	m	Zanu-PF	Chirumanzu-Zibagwe
#17	Zishiri Blessing Charema	m	Zanu-PF	Chirumanzu-Zibagwe
#20	Chisadza Thomas	m	Zanu-PF	Chirumanzu-Zibagwe
#21	Mureriwa Norman Takaidza	m	Zanu-PF	Chirumanzu-Zibagwe
#22	Dzitirai Tapera	m	Zani-PF	Chirumanzu-Zibagwe

== See also ==
- Chirumanzu-Zibagwe
- Zibagwe Rural District Council
