= Auxillia Mnangagwa =

First Lady of Zimbabwe

The Right Honourable Auxillia Mnangagwa
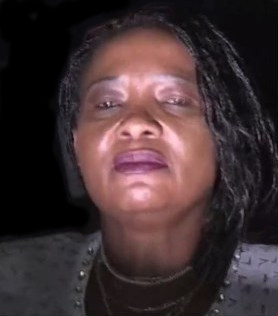
- Mnangagwa in 2017

First Lady of Zimbabwe
- Current
- Assumed role 24 November 2017
- President: Emmerson Mnangagwa
- Preceded by: Grace Mugabe

Second Lady of Zimbabwe
- In office 12 December 2014 – 6 November 2017
- Vice President: Emmerson Mnangagwa
- Preceded by: Solomon Mujuru (as Second Gentleman, 2011)
- Succeeded by: Marry Mubaiwa

Member of the Parliament of Zimbabwe for Chirumanzu–Zibagwe
- In office 28 March 2015 – 30 July 2018
- Preceded by: Emmerson Mnangagwa
- Succeeded by: Prosper Machando

Personal details
- Born: Auxillia Kutyauripo; 25 March 1963 (age 63) Mazowe, Southern Rhodesia (now Zimbabwe)
- Party: ZANU–PF
- Spouse: Emmerson Mnangagwa
- Children: 3

Auxillia Mnangagwa (née Kutyauripo; born 21 March 1963) is a Zimbabwean politician and has served as the First Lady of Zimbabwe since November 2017, as the wife of President Emmerson Mnangagwa. After spending over ten years at the Ministry of Manpower and Development, she joined the Prime Minister's office in 1992. She was elected as a ZANU–PF Member of Parliament in 2015, serving for the same constituency as her husband after he became Vice-President under Robert Mugabe.

== Biography ==
Born on 25 March 1963 in Mazowe District in Mashonaland Central, Auxillia is the second child in a family of five. She was brought up on a farm in Chiweshe where she attended primary and secondary school. Her parents divorced when she was in Grade 3. After completing a secretarial course at Silveira House, Chishawasha, in 1981, she worked for the Ministry of Manpower and Development under Edgar Tekere. She entered politics in 1982, eventually rising to the politburo. From 1992, she was assigned to the Prime Minister's office, joining the Central Intelligence Organisation in 1997. Some reports maintain that from 1992, acting as a high-level security officer at the Sheraton Hotel, she provided information to Mugabe on Emmerson Mnangagwa who was then the de facto head of the CIO. She denies these assertions.

In 1997, she began studying in the Environment and Tourism department at the University of Zimbabwe. She left for Switzerland two years later, graduating in Hotel and Tourism Administration in 2001. On her return to Zimbabwe, she joined the finance department of ZANU-PF in Kwekwe. Following an unsuccessful attempt to stand for the ZANU-PF in her native Mazowe Central, she joined the party's Central Committee in 2009. On behalf of Zanu-PF, she set up a number of women's banks in at Silobela, Zhombe, Kwekwe and Chirumanzu-Zibagwe in Zimbabwe's Midlands Province.

Following her husband's appointment as Vice-President, she stood as the Member of Parliament for Chirumanzu–Zibagwe. After the withdrawal of the two other candidates, she went on to win the parliamentary by-election in 2015.

In 2024, the United States imposed sanctions on Auxilia, her husband Emerson, Vice President Constantino Chiwenga and 11 other Zimbabwean individuals and entities for involvement in human rights abuses, corruption, and minerals smuggling.

In 2026, Mnangagwa visited a suspected serial killer in Chikurubi Prison.

== Personal life ==
She married Emmerson Mnangagwa following the death of his previous wife Jayne, the sister of Josiah Tongogara, at which point she became his second wife. They have three children together: Emmerson Jr., Sean, and Collins.

== Electoral history ==
By-election 2015: Chirumanzu–Zibagwe
Party	Candidate	Votes	%	±%
ZANU–PF	Auxillia Mnangagwa	16,092	94.8%	
NCA	Munashe Mutodza	79	0.5%	
TZ	Abigail Rumbidzai Musambasa	456	2.7%	
Good People’s Movement	Gadzamoyo Dehwa	86	0.5%	
Independent	Chawaona Wilbroad Kanoti	257	1.5%	
Majority		15214	89.6%	
Turnout		16970	86.7%	
ZANU–PF hold		Swing		

== See also ==
- First Lady of Zimbabwe
- Chirumanzu–Zibagwe
