= Cornway College =

- Cornway College Emblem

Location
- No. 1 Haydon, Mount Hampden; Mashonaland West; Zimbabwe; 17°44′30.6″S 30°56′10.3″E

Information
- Type: Private, day and boarding school
- Motto: Let There Be Light
- Religious affiliation: Christianity
- Denomination: Interdenominational
- Opened: 23 January 2006
- Founder: Lovemore Kurotwi
- Gender: Co-educational
- Age: 4 to 18
- Average class size: 25 pupils
- Education system: English
- Language: English
- Houses: Cheetah, Eland, Lion, Tiger
- Colours: Navy blue, aqua, white, yellow
- Nickname: CC
- Team name: Mustangs (Basketball); Wolves (Volleyball)
- Affiliations: National Association of Secondary School Heads
- Examination boards: Cambridge International Examinations; Higher Education Examinations Council; Zimbabwe School Examinations Council
- Postal address: P.O Box CY 3314, Causeway, Harare, Zimbabwe
- Website: Official website

Cornway College is a private, co-educational, day and boarding school in Mount Hampden, Mashonaland West, Zimbabwe, which is 16.5 kilometres from the Harare Central Business District. Cornway College was established in 2006 at its present location. It has a preparatory school (Cornway Junior College) and a high school (Cornway Senior College). The language of instruction is English.

Cornway has a student body with children of various nationalities from the Southern African region to as far afield as the United Kingdom. Cornway College was ranked as one of the Top 10 High Schools in Zimbabwe in 2014.

== History ==
=== Early history ===
The college will bloom like a cornflower.

— Lovemore Kurotwi Junior, circa 2006

Cornway College was founded by Lovemore Kurotwi and was opened on 23 January 2006. Its founding student body was from a study group called Whitehorse Academy which was founded by Mrs S.M. Wenzel, the academy had a pupil population of 120 at the time. The name "Cornway College" was suggested by Lovemore Kurotwi Junior when he was eleven years old. His reason for naming the college "Cornway College" was "The college will bloom like a cornflower." The founding Headmaster of Cornway College is Edmore Mutekwe who left in 2008 and his preparatory counterpart was Mr Mpofu. Both Heads have left the school.

=== 2010s ===
- 2010

Construction of the boarding facilities was completed and both colleges started enrolling pupils who wished to be boarders.

- 2011

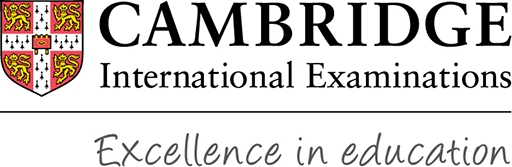
Cambridge International Examinations

The Senior College became a registered Cambridge International Examinations centre. This meant that the college could conduct the examinations for Cambridge International Examinations for Ordinary Level, International General Certificate of Secondary Education, Advanced Subsidiary Level and Advanced Level internally. Before this, Cornway Senior College conducted examinations at an external registered Cambridge International Examinations centre.

- 2012

Cornway was the base of the Zimbabwe national Under-13 football team training camp, coached by Peter Ndlovu, in preparations for the VW World Junior Masters held in Poland. Cornway Senior College hosted its inaugural 3-day sports festival (basketball for girls and soccer for boys) with 18 schools attending the event. The boys' soccer team won in the soccer category of the tournament whilst the girls' basketball team were runners-up. The Interact Club at Cornway Senior College hosted a Christmas dinner at the school hostels where the best pupils of 2012 were honoured.

- 2013

Buses to transport day pupils and staff from the school to their homes in Harare were acquired. They are also used as transport for pupils and to educational tours and sporting events.

Cornway Junior College held its inaugural Africa Day commemorations under the theme "My Culture, My Pride" showcasing African music, dance, cuisine and fashion. Fifty-four countries were represented at the event.

The Senior College became a registered Higher Education Examinations Council centre (HEXCO), allowing pupils to sit for the Computers examinations in particular at the college. The awarded certificate is a vocational qualification that supplements the IGCSE/O-Level and A-Level certificate. Cornway Senior College won M and H Under-17 soccer tournament at Kwekwe High School in which 12 schools participated. The boys' volleyball team won the International School of South Africa (ISSA) Volleyball Festival in Mahikeng, South Africa for the second time whilst the girls' team were the runners-up in their category as the 32 teams from South Africa and Zimbabwe participated. The boys' volleyball team were crowned in the boys' category of the NASH Under-20 volleyball champions at Herman Germaine High School in Bindura. Cornway Senior College received a prize at the Science, Engineering and Technology (SET) Week held at the Harare Exhibition Park for devising a mobile phone-controlled remote system.

- 2014

The Junior College received a new headmaster, after the departure of Mrs Zengeya. The Junior College began implementing the Cambridge Primary program developed by Cambridge International Examinations.

The Senior College Under-20 basketball team won second place in the St. George's College U20 Basketball Invitational Tournament that saw the participation of fifteen schools. The Under-20 soccer team came third out of the nineteen schools that played in the Hammer and Tongues U20 Soccer Tournament. The Cornway Senior College boys' volleyball team won the St George's College Under 20 Volleyball Tournament with the girls' volleyball team achieving second place in their category. The boys' volleyball team at Cornway Senior College retained its title in the National Association of Secondary School Heads (NASH) U20 volleyball tournament held at Kwekwe High School in the Midlands Province. The Interact Club at the Senior College held a Charity Golf Tournament at Highland Country Club on the 8th of August. Proceeds from the event went to Simbaredenga Children's Home. Cornway had seven boys selected into Zimbabwe Under-17 national basketball team after the players won the National Association of Secondary School Heads (NASH) Under-17 Basketball tournament in Harare representing Mashonaland West. The Senior College won the second edition of the National Association of Secondary School Heads (NASH) Under 20 Beach Volleyball Tournament in the boys' category with 24 boys' teams and 22 girls' teams participating in the tournament. The Senior College was ranked as one of the Top 10 High Schools in Zimbabwe in 2014. Twenty pupils of the Senior College and Harare City Council workers went on a clean-up campaign to raise awareness of hygiene, cleaning up Mabelreign Shopping Centre in Harare.

- 2015

Cornway Senior College boys' basketball team won the Bob@91 Basketball Tournament in the schools category. The quiz team, representing Cornway, that participated in the inaugural Harare High School Quiz hosted by the Young Men's Christian Association Zimbabwe, were runners-up, coming second out of eight schools at the event. Cornway Senior College had five handball players (four boys and one girl) selected into the Mashrhino handball team, a select side that set up by the Mashonaland West Handball Association to participate in the Hanse Cup hosted by TSG Bergedof (a German handball club) and the Hamburg Handball Association in Hamburg, Germany. The Mashrhino squad was the first non-European side to participate in the tournament. The Under-20 soccer team attained second place in the Hammer and Tongues U20 Soccer Tournament that saw 20 schools in attendance. The Under-20 volleyball teams won the St. George's College U20 Boys and Girls Volleyball Tournament. The Senior College boys' volleyball team won the NASH Volleyball Tournament held in Marondera. Three handball players (boys) from Cornway were selected by the Mashonaland West Handball Association into the Mashrhino select side that will participate in the 2016 edition of the Hanse Cup. In September, Prince Masvikeni became the head of the Senior College following Gideon Sadazi's departure.

- 2016

The Senior College boys' basketball team won the schools division of the Bob 92 Basketball Tournament held in Harare. The Senior College Interact Club made a donation of 400 textbooks, stationery and teacher reading material to St Mannocks Primary School, a rural school in Manyame, Mashonaland West that serves the local farming communities. The Senior College Under-20 boys' football team won the Schools Champions League title. The Senior College boys' basketball team won the Day & Night Basketball Tournament hosted by Prince Edward School in Harare with girls' basketball team attained second place in the tournament.

== Motto ==
And God said, "Let there be light," and there was light. — Genesis 1:3, New International Version

"Let There Be Light" is the motto of the Colleges. The motto is synonymous with a phrase from a popular verse in the Bible. The verse is Genesis 1:3 and is as follows in the New International Version of the bible: "And God said, "Let there be light," and there was light." The phrase can be interpreted as the spreading of knowledge and dispelling ignorance. The Latin equivalent, "Fiat Lux" (also rendered as "Sit Lux" et cetera) is used by numerous other institutions globally e.g. University of California, University of Liverpool etc. The motto appears on the Cornway College emblem.

== Admission ==
- Senior College

Admission into the college is largely based on academic merit.

- For Form One admission, applicants must sit for entrance examination to get a place at the school. If unable to sit for the entrance examination, depending on the availability of places, applicants can use Cambridge Primary qualification, ZIMSEC Grade Seven qualification or any equivalent qualification to apply.
- For Forms Two and Three, reports or assessments from previous schools accompanied by a transfer letter. This is dependent on the availability of places.
- For the Sixth Form (Lower Six only), admission into the college is determined by IGCSE, Ordinary Level or equivalent qualifications.

== See also ==
- List of schools in Zimbabwe
- List of boarding schools
- Education in Zimbabwe
