= Silobela (constituency) =

Coordinates: 18.984258°S 29.299732°E

- Constituency for the National Assembly of Zimbabwe
- Province: Midlands
- Region: Silobela

Current constituency
- Created: 1990
- Number of members: 1
- Party: ZANU–PF
- Member(s): Jona Nyevera
- Created from: Kwekwe West

Silobela is a constituency represented in the National Assembly of the Parliament of Zimbabwe, located in Silobela, Midlands Province. Its current MP since the 2023 election is Jona Nyevera of ZANU–PF.

== History ==
In the 1985–1990 term the whole of Silobela Communal Land and Zhombe Communal Land were part of one big constituency, Kwekwe West, whose MP was Hon. Josiah Tavagwisa Chinyati. From 2000 to 2008 the boundaries of Silobela constituency remained the same. 9 wards of Redcliff Municipality were under Silobela. At present the Redcliff Municipal wards are no longer part of this constituency. Also ward 5, 15 and 26 of the Kwekwe Rural District Council Zibagwe RDC, which are in Zhombe, have been added to this constituency. The current Silobela constituency comprises wards 4, 5, 15, 17, 18, 19, 20, 21, 25, 27, 28, 29 and 33.

== Members ==
Election	Name	Party
1990	Steven Vuma	ZANU–PF
1995	Margaret Msimbe	ZANU–PF
2000	Abednigo Malinga	MDC
2005	Abednigo Malinga	MDC
2008	Anadi Arnold Sululu	MDC–T
2013	Mtokozisi Manoki-Mpofu	ZANU–PF
2018	Mtokozisi Manoki-Mpofu	ZANU–PF
2023	Jona Nyevera	ZANU–PF

== Election results ==
Zimbabwean general election, 2013
Party	Candidate	Votes	%	±%
Independent 1	Clement Moyo	183	1.1%	?
Independent 2	Fanuel Sibindi	96	0.06%	?
MDC-M	Rittah Ndlovu	1050	6.6%	?
MDCZ	Anadi Sululu	5,323	33.4%	?
ZANU-PF	Mtokozisi M Mpofu	8,142	51.2%	?
ZAPU	Thomas T Ndebele	318	1.9%	?

== See also ==
- List of Zimbabwean parliamentary constituencies
