= Redcliff (constituency) =

Coordinates: 19.03334°S 29.78333°E

Kwekwe Central
- Constituency for the National Assembly of Zimbabwe
- Province: Midlands
- Region: Redcliff

Current constituency
- Seats: 1
- Party: Citizens Coalition for Change
- Member(s): Judith Tobaiwa

Redcliff is a constituency represented in the National Assembly of the Parliament of Zimbabwe, located in Redcliff, Midlands Province. Its current MP since the 2023 election is July Moyo of ZANU–PF.

== History ==
Redcliff was created out of Kwekwe constituency prior to the 2008 general election. It comprises Redcliff town, Ripple Creek and Komera. It also covers parts of Silobela, including St Marks, Totololo, Loreto, Gothic Mine and Hozoli. East of the Harare-Bulawayo Road it takes up to Shungu and Mlezu in Chiwundura. It is administered by Redcliff Municipality. However, five of its wards are under Zibagwe Rural District Council: 22, 23, 24 and 30, and parts of ward 3.

== Profile ==
Local government comprises nine urban councillors under Redcliff Municipality and four rural district councillors under Kwekwe Rural District Council, officially called Zibagwe Rural District Council.

=== Population ===
Population table

Class	Males	Females	Total	Registered voters	
Population	30032	30462	60894	30018	14451
Proportion	48%	52%	100%	50%	4 persons

Voters here were almost 50% of the population which suggests that almost every adult is a registered voter and each couple have two children under majority age. This raises questions as to whether the census can be relied upon.

=== Voters ===
Subject	Ward 1	Ward 2	Ward 3	Ward 4	Ward 5	Ward 6	Ward 7	Ward 8	Ward 9	Ward 22	Ward 24	Ward 25	Ward 30	Total
Voters	1458	2109	3692	2772	2735	3712	969	*	*	3376	517	5412	*	30018

=== Education ===
There are 29 primary schools and 4 secondary schools in Redcliff Constituency, 119 primary school teachers and 70 at secondary schools. Enrolment according to a 2011 government publication was 17,002 primary school pupils and 688 secondary school students.

=== Primary schools ===
Subject	Ward 1	Ward 2	Ward 3	Ward 4	Ward 5	Ward 6	Ward 7	Ward 8	Ward 9	Ward 22	Ward 24	Ward 25	Ward 30	Total
Schools	2	1	13	*	4	1	1	*	*	2	3	2	*	29
Boys	646	492	2073	*	2418	173	530	*	*	913	1037	502	*	8721
Girls	639	415	2074	*	2087	168	556	*	*	-896	842	540	*	8281
Total pupils	1285	844	4147	*	4505	341	1086	*	*	1809	1979	1006	*	17002
Teachers (m)	3	4	35	*	16	1	2	*	*	23	23	12	*	119
Teachers (f)	38	25	82	*	199	10	32	*	*	27	35	13	*	381
Total teachers	41	29	117	*	135	11	34	*	*	50	58	25	*	500
Ratio	31	29	35	*	33	31	32	*	*	36	34	40	*	34

=== Secondary schools ===
All four secondary schools in Redcliff Constituency are owned by the Kwekwe Rural District Council officially called Zibagwe RDC. Enrolment total in the four schools was 688 students to 70 teachers, for a 10:1 ratio.

Ward 22 has the highest number of students, Ward 24 the least, while Ward 25 has the highest number of female students.

== Health facilities ==
Source: Redcliff Constituency Profile

Subject	Ward 1	Ward 2	Ward 3	Ward 4	Ward 5	Ward 6	Ward 7	Ward 8	Ward 9	Ward 22	Ward 24	Ward 25	Ward 30	Total
Polyclinics	*	1	*	*	*	1	*	*	*	*	*	*	*	2
Surgeries	*	1	1	*	*	1	1	*	1	*	*	*	*	5
Clinics	*	1	*	*	*	*	*	*	3	*	2	*	1	7
Hospitals	*	*	*	*	*	*	*	*	*	1	*	*	*	1
Rural HCs	*	*	*	*	*	*	*	*	*	*	*	1	*	1
Doctors	*	2	1	*	*	1	1	*	1	1	*	*	*	7
Nurses	*	7	*	*	*	*	*	*	24	14	3	3	1	52

Key: Rural HC = Rural health center. This a clinic, less than a hospital.

=== Animal health ===
There are 17,442 cattle, 8 veterinary service centers and 18 dip tanks. Ward 25 has highest number of cattle and Ward 30 the least. Cattle and dip tanks are in wards 1, 22, 24, 25 and 30 only.

Distribution table

Subject	Ward 1	Ward 22	Ward 24	Ward 25	Ward 30	Total
Cattle	4496	5212	1133	5815	784	17442
Percentage	25.8%	29.9	6.5%	33.3%	4.5%	100%

=== Water points ===
These exclude urban area water points.

Subject	Ward 22	Ward 24	Ward 25	Total
Boreholes	33	41	26	100
Functional	33	26	25	84
Deep wells	3	1	1	5

- Ward 22 = Makaba Ward
- Ward 24 = Kushinga Ward
- Ward 25 = Msokeli Ward

== Election results ==
Parliamentary election 2018: Redcliff parliamentary elections
Party	Candidate	Votes	%	±%
PRC	Coffee Pindirire	905	-%	?
ZIPP	Gotora Edmore	245	-%	?
Independent	Jack Cheneso	458	-%	?
Independent	Maradze Lovemore	334	-%	?
NPF	Moyo Brenda	128	-%	?
ZANU-PF	Moyo July	11,320		?
MDC Alliance	Mukapiko Dzikamai Lloyd	11,739	-%	?
UDA	Mupandaguta Matthew	79	-%	?

Parliamentary election 2013: Redcliff
Party	Candidate	Votes	%
Independent	Chinhara Aaron	2,448	?
MDC–T	Chidziva Happymore	5,823	?
MDC-M	Sibanda Godwin	743	?
ZANU–PF	Ncube Harris	7,631	?
Majority		1,808	
ZANU–PF win			

2008 parliamentary election

Six candidates contested for the Redcliff Constituency parliamentary seat with the final result coming after a by-election on 27 June 2008. Isheunesu Muza of ZANU-PF beat Chinhara Aaron of MDC-M, Tapera Sengweni of MDC-T, Makaha Ignatius of ZDP and Anastasia Moyo, an Independent candidate.

== See also ==
- List of Zimbabwean parliamentary constituencies
