= Chirumanzu–Zibagwe =

Coordinates: 19°17′S 30°32′E

- Constituency for the National Assembly of Zimbabwe
- Region: Chirumhanzu District

Current constituency
- Created: 2008; 18 years ago
- Member: Prosper Machando (ZANU–PF)
- Created from: Chirumanzu and Zhombe

Chirumanzu–Zibagwe is a constituency of the National Assembly of the Parliament of Zimbabwe, located in the Chirumhanzu District in Midlands Province. Mvuma, a small mining town, is one of the largest commercial centers in the constituency. The constituency was created in 2008 from the old Chirumanzu and Zhombe constituencies. Emmerson Mnangagwa, now the President of Zimbabwe, was the inaugural member, followed by his wife, Auxillia Mnangagwa. Its current Member of Parliament is Prosper Machando (ZANU–PF).

== History ==
Chirumanzu–Zibagwe was created prior to the 2008 Zimbabwean general election, with territory taken from the old Chirumanzu and Zhombe constituencies. It stretches all the way from Mvuma, east side of the Harare-Masvingo Highway to the west side of the Harare-Bulawayo Highway to areas which were formerly under Zhombe constituency. It also covers places like Rukundo and Netherburn along the Gweru-Mvuma Highway.

Emmerson Mnangagwa won the constituency in 2008, and was reelected in 2013. In a 2015 by-election, his wife Auxillia Mnangagwa was elected to replace her husband, who vacated the seat when he became Vice-President of Zimbabwe. In 2018, Mnangagwa announced that she would not be running for reelection to Parliament in order to focus more on her role as First Lady. Her successor, the incumbent Prosper Machando, won the seat in the July 2018 general election.

== Demographics ==
In 2011, Chirumanzu–Zibagwe had a population of 40,185 people in 10,246 households. In 2011, the constituency had 19,566 registered voters, or 48% of the population. The constituency had 38 primary schools with 292 teachers serving 24,041 students, and 13 secondary schools with 2,887 pupils and 112 teachers. There are 11 health facilities in the constituency, including five hospitals.

== List of members ==
Image	Name	Term	Party
	Emmerson Mnangagwa	2008 – 2014	ZANU–PF
	Auxillia Mnangagwa	2015 – 2018	ZANU–PF
	Prosper Machando	2018 – present	ZANU–PF

== Electoral history ==
By-election 2015: Chirumanzu-Zibagwe
Party	Candidate	Votes	%	±%
ZANU–PF	Auxillia Mnangagwa	16,092	94.8%	
NCA	Munashe Mutodza	79	0.5%	
TZ	Abigail Rumbidzai Musambasa	456	2.7%	
Good People’s Movement	Gadzamoyo Dehwa	86	0.5%	
Independent	Chawaona Wilbroad Kanoti	257	1.5%	
Majority		15214	89.6%	
Turnout		16970	86.7%	
ZANU–PF hold		Swing		

== See also ==
- List of Zimbabwean parliamentary constituencies
