= Eliah Masiyane =

Zimbabwean politician

Eliah Masiyane (died 15 July 2022) was a Zimbabwean politician and clergyman. He was a Lutheran evangelist and elected as member of Parliament of Zimbabwe for Gwanda South constituency in the 1990 general election, representing ZANU-PF.
