= Chirumhanzu District =

Coordinates: 19.2816°S 30.5305°E

- administrative district
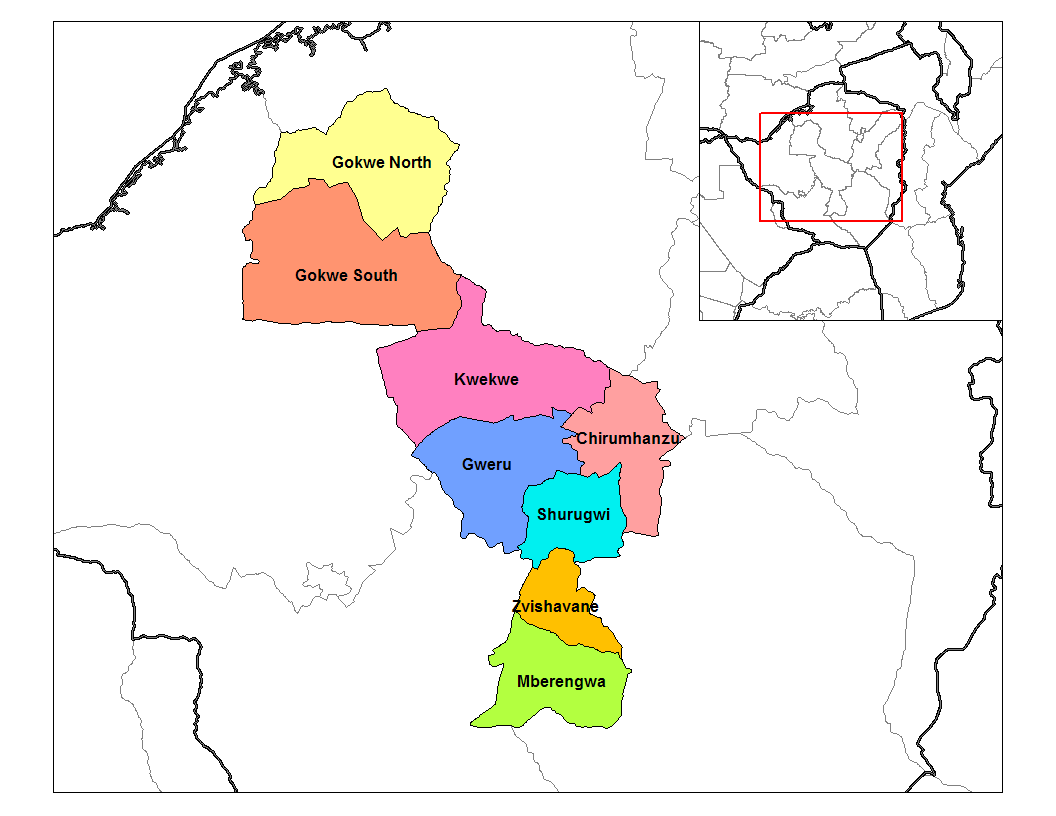
- Chirumhanzu District in Midlands
- Country: Zimbabwe
- Province: Midlands

Area
  - Total: 4,749 km^{2} (1,834 sq mi)

Population (2022)
  - Total: 95,272
- Time zone: UTC+2 (CAT)

Chirumhanzu District is a Second-order Administrative Sub-division of Midlands (Zimbabwe) between Gweru and Masvingo.

Its center is about 46 km south of Mvuma but the administrative centre has moved to Mvuma a small mining town that is found along Harare-Masvingo-Beitbridge Highway near Gweru Turn-off.

== Geography ==
The district is 496 square kilometers in area. In 2002 census there were 70,441 people, thus 16,319 households and given a growth rate of 1.1% per annum, the current population is estimated at +/- 80,000. (2016)

Chirumanzu communal lands occupy the southern part of Chirumanzu district between longitude 29˚50́E and 30˚45Έ and between latitudes 19˚30́S and 20˚20́S.

== Weather ==
The mean annual rainfall is 650mm while the mean temperature ranges from 12-28˚C.

Climate change means that weather and climate information should now be packaged timely and with greater relevance to specific areas, to help small-scale farmers plan better. For Chirumanzu District, click |this | external link for an updated current and weekly weather forecast.

== Background ==
Chirumhanzi District derives its name from the legendary Chirumhanzu chieftain. Chirumhanzu was a descriptive name for a particular chief. The correct spelling should be Chiri-muhanzu meaning "something that is hidden under the garment". The original Chief Chirimuhanzu had a celebrated garment made of dassie or rock-rabbit skins. He had special a pouch he kept under the garment skirts which many still think was a talisman or a stolen treasure. Local people, following their custom, did not dare to mention the chief's traditional name, and just said "Chirimuhanzu," meaning "that whatever in the garment". No one knew what dangled from underneath his garment, and they referred to that thing as "it in the garment" _ Chiri-mu-hanzu.

== Local government ==
Chirumanzu Rural District Council now officially called Takawira Rural District Council is the local authority in this district. It operates in terms of the Zimbabwe Rural District Councils Act

Takawira RDC covers 2 parliamentary constituencies, Chirumhanzu constituency and Chirumanzu-Zibagwe constituency.

== Economy ==
The chrome rich Great Dyke passes through the districts. There are a number of small mines along the Great Dyke which include |Netherburn Mine Latitude: -19°19'26.47" Longitude: 30°9'9.97" and Africa Chrome Fields

The bigger mines are Duration Gold, Athens Mine, Zimasco and Zim Alloys.

== Hospitals ==
There are several mission hospitals in Chirumhanzu District; Driefontein, Holy Cross Mission, Muvonde Mission and St Theresa.

== Education ==
=== Primary schools ===
Source: Chirumanzu Primary Schools

- Angley Ranch Primary School
- Batanai Primary School
- Chapwanya Primary School
- Chamakanda Primary School
- Chihosho Primary School
- Chilimanzi Primary School
- Chimbindi Primary School
- Chinyuni Primary School
- Chitendrano Primary School
- Chitora Primary School
- Chiweshe Primary School
- Chizhou Primary School
- Chizvinire Primary School
- Debwe Primary School
- Driefontein Primary School
- Fairfield Primary School
- Gwanza Primary School
- Govere Primary School
- Guramatunhu School
- Mavhaire Primary school
- Machekano Tokwe Primary School
- Machekano Primary School
- Magada Primary School
- Majandu Primary School
- Makanya School
- Mapiravana Primary School
- Mashamba Primary School
- Maware Primary School
- Mazvimba School
- Muwani Primary School
- Gambiza Primary School
- Nyamandi Primary School
- Hwata Primary School
- Mhende Primary School
- Munikwa Primary School
- Mutya Primary School
- Nyautongwe Primary School
- Rupepwe Primary School
- Rutunga Primary School
- Shashe Primary School
- st Josephs primary school

=== Secondary schools ===
Source: Chirumanzu Secondary Schools

- ACEBS College
- Chengwena Secondary School
- Chizhou Secondary School
- Chivona Secondary School
- Gonawapotera School
- Lalapanzi Secondary School
- Mapiravana Secondary School
- Mutenderende Secondary School
- Siyahokwe Government High School
- Holy Cross High School
- Hama Higher School
- Mushandirapamwe Secondary School
- Chamakanda Secondary School
- Chishuku Secondary School
- Driefontein Secondary School
- Leopold Takawira High School
- New England Secondary School
- Rambakombwa Secondary School
- Otton Drift Secondary School
- Taringana secondary school
- Upfumba Secondary School
- Mukomberanwa Secondary School

== See also ==
- Takawira RDC
- Midlands Province
- Mvuma
- Lalapanzi
- Chirumanzu-Zibagwe constituency
