= Zhombe (constituency) =

Constituency of the Parliament of Zimbabwe

Coordinates: 18.677197°S 29.34916°E

- Constituency for the National Assembly of Zimbabwe
- Province: Midlands
- Region: Zhombe

Current constituency
- Created: 1990
- Number of members: 1
- Party: ZANU–PF
- Member(s): Edmore Samambwa

Zhombe is a constituency represented inf the National Assembly of the Parliament of Zimbabwe, located in Zhombe, Midlands Province. Its current MP since the 2018 election is Edmore Samambwa of ZANU–PF.

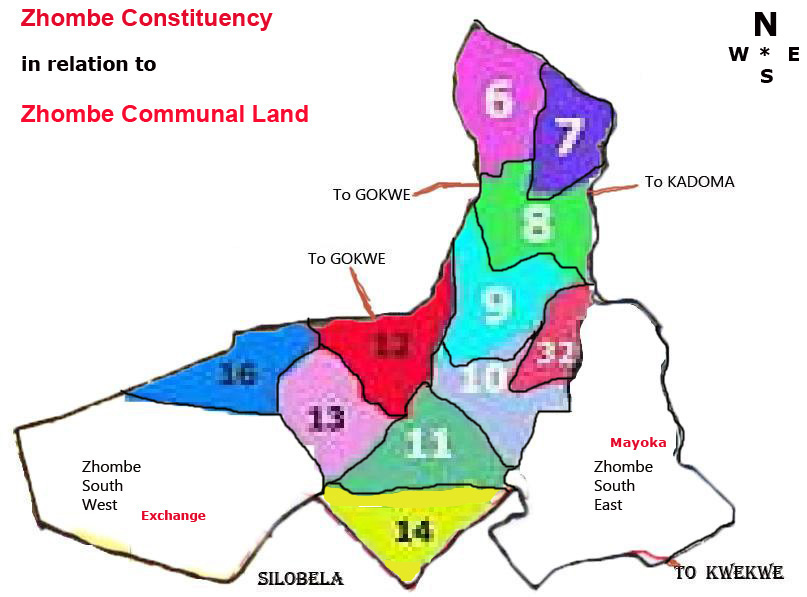
Zhombe constituency in relation to Zhombe communal land

== Members ==
| Election | Name | Party |
|---|---|---|
| 1990 | Peter Hewlett | ZANU–PF |
| 1995 | Peter Hewlett | ZANU–PF |
| 2000 | Daniel Mackenzie Ncube | ZANU–PF |
| 2005 | Daniel Mackenzie Ncube | ZANU–PF |
| 2008 | Roger Tazviona | MDC–T |
| 2013 | Daniel Mackenzie Ncube | ZANU–PF |
| 2018 | Edmore Samambwa | ZANU–PF |
| 2023 | Edmore Samambwa | ZANU–PF |

== Election results ==
=== 2018 ===
Parliamentary election 2018: Zhombe
| Party | Candidate | Votes | % | ±% |
|---|---|---|---|---|
| ZIPP | Edward Chamboko | 905 | -% | ? |
| MDC Alliance | Datsun Mapfumo | 8,517 | -% | ? |
| FreeZim Congress | Hlupe Mbiba | 151 | -% | ? |
| PRC | Benison Judah Ntini | 684 | -% | ? |
| ZANU-PF | Edmore Samambwa | 13,377 | -% | ? |
| ZAPU | Thokozana Sitsha | 238 | -% | ? |

=== 2013 ===
Parliamentary election 2013: Zhombe
| Party | Candidate | Votes | % | ±% |
|---|---|---|---|---|
| Independent | Brian Bako | 834 | 4.8% | ? |
| MDC-M | Sandra Ncube | 921 | 5.3% | ? |
| MDC-T | Roger Tazviona | 5,218 | 30.2% | ? |
| ZANU-PF | Daniel Mackenzie Ncube | 9;850 | 57% | ? |
| ZAPU | Bernard Magugu | 427 | 2.5% | ? |

=== 2008 ===
Parliamentary election 2008: Zhombe
| Party | Candidate | Votes | % |
|---|---|---|---|
| MDC–T | Roger Tazviona | 5,445 | ?% |
| MDC-M | John Edson Nyathi | 2,289 | ?% |
| ZANU–PF | Daniel Mackenzie Ncube | 5,122 | ?% |
| Majority | | 323 | ?% |
| MDC–T win (new seat) | | | |

Voter turnout 40.55%

=== 2005 ===
Parliamentary election 2005: Zhombe
| Party | Candidate | Votes | % |
|---|---|---|---|
| MDC–T | Edson Nyathi | 8,579 | 35.7% |
| ZANU–PF | Daniel Mackenzie Ncube | 14,750 | 61.3%% |
| Majority | | 6281 | 26.1% |
| ZANU–PF win | | | |

At the time of election in 2005, there was a total of 44,851 registered voters in Zhombe constituency. 54% voted, and of 24,050 ballots cast, the MDC polled 8,579 and Zanu-PF polled 14,750, while 721 were spoiled ballots.

=== 2000 ===
Parliamentary election 2000: Zhombe
| Party | Candidate | Votes | % | ±% |
|---|---|---|---|---|
| Independent | Albert Charles Moyo Madambe | 386 | 1.9% | ? |
| Independent | Ganagana Wilbroad | 0 | 0 | ? |
| Movement for Democratic Change-Tsvangirai | Anna Mutisi | 8,165 | 39.6% | ? |
| United Parties | Gibson Dhuza | 539 | 2.6% | ? |
| ZANU–PF | Daniel Mackenzie Ncube | 10,757 | 52.1% | ? |

=== 1995 ===
Peter Hewlett, ZANU-PF was elected.

This was the first election to be boycotted by some minority political parties in Zimbabwe since independence in 1980. However 55 of the 120 seats were not contested and ZANU-PF was the only party that fielded candidates in all the remaining 65 constituencies.

ZANU- Ndonga won 2 seats letting ZANU-PF collect 118 over 120 seats. Margaret Dongo, a renegade from ZANU-PF, contested her defeat in a court of law and a by-election gave her the seat. At the end of the day ZANU-PF had 117 seats, ZANU-NDONGA 2 and Margaret Dongo 1.

=== 1990 ===
Parliamentary election 1990: Zhombe
| Party | Candidate | Votes | % |
|---|---|---|---|
| Independent | Raphael Muroyiwa | | |
| ZUM | Rodger Ross | | |
| ZANU–PF | Peter Hewlett | | |
| Majority | | | |
| ZANU–PF win | | | |

=== 1985 ===
Parliamentary election 1985: Kwekwe West
| Party | Candidate | Votes | % | ±% |
|---|---|---|---|---|
| ZANU-PF | Josiah Tavagwisa Chinyati | 18,6007 | 50.6% | ? |
| PF-ZAPU | Stephen Kenneth Sesulelo Vuma | 17,257 | 46.9% | ? |
| UANC | Luckson Chando Mugara | 766 | 2.1% | ? |
| ZANU | Samuel Maara | 150 | 0.4% | ? |

== See also ==
- List of Zimbabwean parliamentary constituencies
