= Manyame (constituency) =

Manyame is a constituency of Mashonaland West in Zimbabwe. It is about 40 km from Harare.

It was created before the 2005 Zimbabwean parliamentary elections. After the 2005 election, researcher Lloyd M Sachikonye reported in an article published in the Journal of African Elections that the Zimbabwe Electoral Commission found that while "14,812 voters had cast their ballots when the polls closed," the final count was 23,760 votes. The constituency was won by Patrick Zhuwao, nephew of then-President of Zimbabwe Robert Mugabe, for the ruling party, ZANU–PF, over the opposition Movement for Democratic Change by a margin of 15,448 votes to 8,312.

== See also ==
- Manyame River
- Manyame Air Base
