= Zimbabwe Unity Movement =

The Zimbabwe Unity Movement, was a short lived political movement in Zimbabwe. It served as a successor and link to the Conservative Alliance of Zimbabwe. Edgar Tekere ran as Presidential Candidate in the 1990 Zimbabwean Presidential election, against Robert Mugabe.

== History ==
Tekere supported Mugabe at the 1985 elections but by October 1988 his consistent criticism of corruption resulted in his expulsion from the party. When Mugabe voiced his belief that Zimbabwe would be better governed as a one-party state, Tekere strongly disagreed, saying "A one-party state was never one of the founding principles of ZANU-PF and experience in Africa has shown that it brought the evils of nepotism, corruption and inefficiency."

In 1989, Tekere established the Zimbabwe Unity Movement (ZUM), challenging Mugabe in the 1990 elections without success. His economic platform including offering a broadly free market against Mugabe's centralized economic planning. Tekere received unprecedented support for his opposition to Mugabe, prompting the ZANU to engage in voter suppression, violence, and harassment. Incidents included a fatal attack on two ZUM representatives in Karoi. Intimidation was employed throughout regions of Zimbabwe where ZANU encountered substantial opposition from ZUM. Conversely, in areas like Masvingo Province in southern Zimbabwe, where ZANU had solidified its base through beneficial relationships and the provision of social services, the political climate was relatively calm with minimal reports of election-related violence. During the election on 1 April 1990, Mugabe received 2,026,976 votes, compared to the 413,840 (16% of the vote) received by Tekere.

At the simultaneous Parliamentary elections the ZUM won 20% of the vote but only two seats in the House of Assembly. Zimbabwe Unity Movement supporters were the targets of violent attacks from supporters of ZANU (PF) and five candidates were murdered. A student representative Israel Mutanhaurwa of ZUM was abducted in broad daylight by suspected state agents at the local cinemas in Gweru to be dumped unharmed on the outskirts of Mkoba a local suburb. No-one was arrested or convicted of the crime. Those convicted of the attempted murder of former Gweru Mayor Patrick Kombayi who was shot in lower abdomen but survived the shooting, were pardoned immediately afterwards.
