= Mvuma =

Coordinates: 19°17′S 30°32′E

Mvuma, previously named 'Umvuma', is a small mining town in Midlands province in Zimbabwe.

Located 192 km south of Harare along the Harare - Masvingo highway. Approx 100 km from Masvingo.

== Background ==
The main employer was the Athens Mine (formerly the Falcon Mine) owned by Lonrho Zimbabwe which mined gold, silver, and copper. It was closed down around 1996 due to a mine shaft collapse and the low price of gold. One may still see a huge chimney, on top of a hill near the mine, built in 1913 and visible from miles away. The chimney is 40.28m tall. A Scotsman by the name of Blackie, the maternal grandfather of virologist Professor Robert 'Bob' Swanepoel, apparently played a major role in building this chimney.

== Population ==
The population is estimated to be around 7000, and the town has an altitude of 1406m.

== Geology ==
The Athens and Falcon gold-copper mines are just south of Mvuma, within the east-west trending Umvuma greenstone belt, consisting of talcose, tremolitic, and chloritic schists. Claims were filed at Falcon in 1900, and mining of chalcopyrite, with a gold content of 6.7 gram per ton, took place from 1910 until 1926. The Athens, 500 m to the east, was mined from 1923 until 1958 for gold and silver within pyrite, pyrrhotite, and chalcopyrite. Lonrho Investment Co. operated the claims starting in 1973.

== Geography ==
The area is link between Gweru and Chivhu. Located approximately 83 km from Gweru and approximately 54 km to Chivhu. The area is surrounded by Chirumhanzu Communal lands which fall within its administration. Nearby farms include the former Central Estates Headquarters formerly owned by N. Van Hoogstraten with capacity to employee 1000 workers. Due to land redistribution in 2000 the agricultural hub failed, with the closure of Athens mine, led to migration and thus urban decay of Mvuma.

== Operations ==
There are huge cyanide dumps around the town as a by-product from the gold mining. Now dominated by cattle ranching and agriculture as the means of community support. Formally known as Umvuma, and Umvooma. Mvuma houses a few government offices at district level. It hosts the Chirumhanzu Rural District Council offices as well as a district hospital.

== Economy ==
In 2010 business started booming in Mvuma, taking advantage of highway users. Chicken Slice, a fast food outlet and Unique Rama, a truckstop and restaurant, were opened. In 2013 a complex housing banks and lodges was commissioned improving the livelihoods by creating employment for the locals. Mvuma Art and Craft Centre is on the western side of the A4 a short distance north of Chicken Slice. A range of stone sculptures is sold to passing motorists.
