= Max Rosenfels =

Max Rosenfels (born 27 August 1925) was a Zimbabwean politician and rancher.

== Biography ==
Rosenfels was born at Marula. His grandfather, a German Jew, came to Rhodesia in 1894.

He was educated locally, and at Plumtree School.

He was a member of the Senate of Zimbabwe from 1983 when as an independent candidate he defeated the Republican Front's candidate, Des van Jaarsveldt, to succeed Senator Jack Mussett.

In 1985, Rosenfels stood for the House of Assembly, but was defeated.

In 1990 Rosenfels was elected to the House of Assembly as a ZANU–PF MP.

He and his son were ambushed in 1983 but both men survived the attack.

Rosenfels was Jewish.
