= 1990 Zimbabwean general election =

- 23 March 1990
- Presidential election
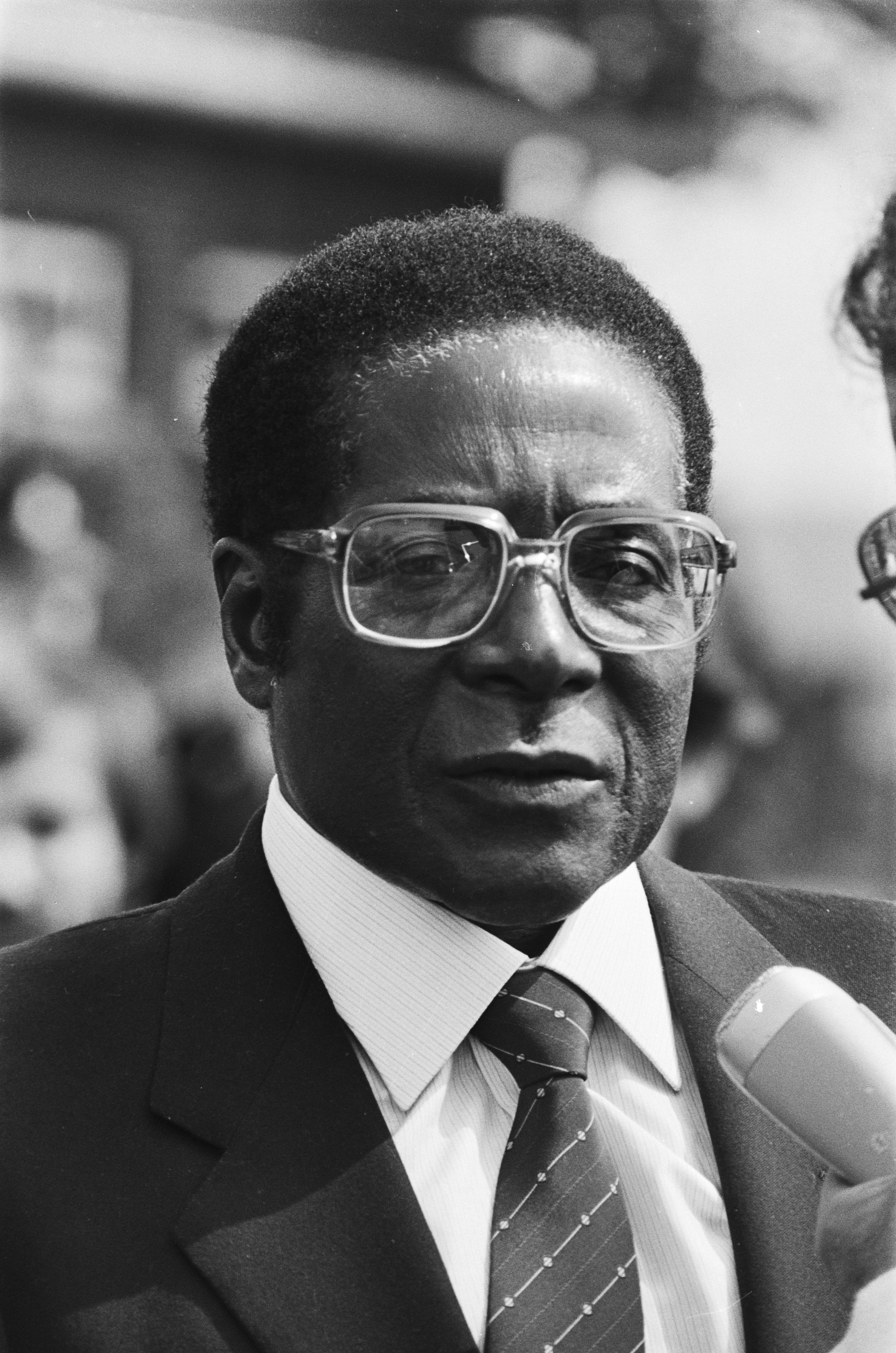

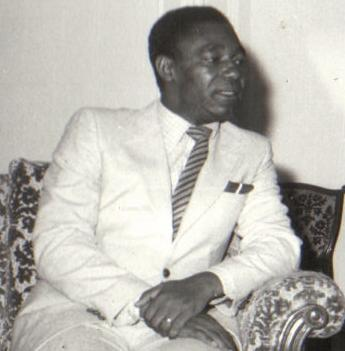
Candidate	Robert Mugabe	Edgar Tekere
Party	ZANU–PF	ZUM
Popular vote	2,026,976	413,840
Percentage	83.05%	16.95%
- Results by province
President before election
Robert Mugabe
ZANU–PF
Elected President
Robert Mugabe
ZANU–PF
- Parliamentary election
Party	Leader	Vote %	Seats	+/–
ZANU–PF	Robert Mugabe	80.55	117	+53
ZUM	Edgar Tekere	17.59	2	New
ZANU–Ndonga	Ndabaningi Sithole	0.93	1	+1
This lists parties that won seats. See the complete results below.

General elections were held in Zimbabwe on 23 March 1990 to elect the president and Parliament. They were the first elections to be contested under the amended constitution of 1987, which established an elected executive presidency and abolished the Senate. They were also the first ever elections in the country to be contested on a single roll, with no separate voting for whites and blacks.

In the presidential contest, incumbent Robert Mugabe secured his first full term; he had become President following the 1987 constitutional amendments after serving as Prime Minister since the country gained internationally recognised independence in 1980. Mugabe's ZANU–PF party won 117 of the 120 elected seats in Parliament.

The elections were not free and fair. Mugabe's regime and the ZANU-PF used paramilitary organizations to intimidate opposition, and also abused legislative and judicial powers to stay in power.

== Results ==
=== President ===
Candidate	Party	Votes	%
Robert Mugabe	ZANU–PF	2,026,976	83.05
Edgar Tekere	Zimbabwe Unity Movement	413,840	16.95
Total		2,440,816	100.00
Valid votes		2,440,816	94.34
Invalid/blank votes		146,388	5.66
Total votes		2,587,204	100.00
Registered voters/turnout		4,799,333	53.91
Source: African Elections Database

=== Parliament ===
A total of 4,799,324 voters were registered, but 576,432 were in uncontested constituencies.

Graph of the party split among 120 seats.
Party	Votes	%	Seats	+/–
ZANU–PF	1,690,071	80.55	117	+53
Zimbabwe Unity Movement	369,031	17.59	2	New
ZANU–Ndonga	19,448	0.93	1	0
United African National Council	11,191	0.53	0	New
National Democratic Union	498	0.02	0	New
Independents	7,954	0.38	0	–1
Total	2,098,193	100.00	120	+20
Valid votes	2,098,193	93.76		
Invalid/blank votes	139,653	6.24		
Total votes	2,237,846	100.00		
Registered voters/turnout	4,222,892	52.99		
Source: African Elections Database, Nohlen et al.
