= Second Cabinet of Emmerson Mnangagwa =

Government of Zimbabwe 2018-2023

- Cabinet of Zimbabwe
- 2018–2023
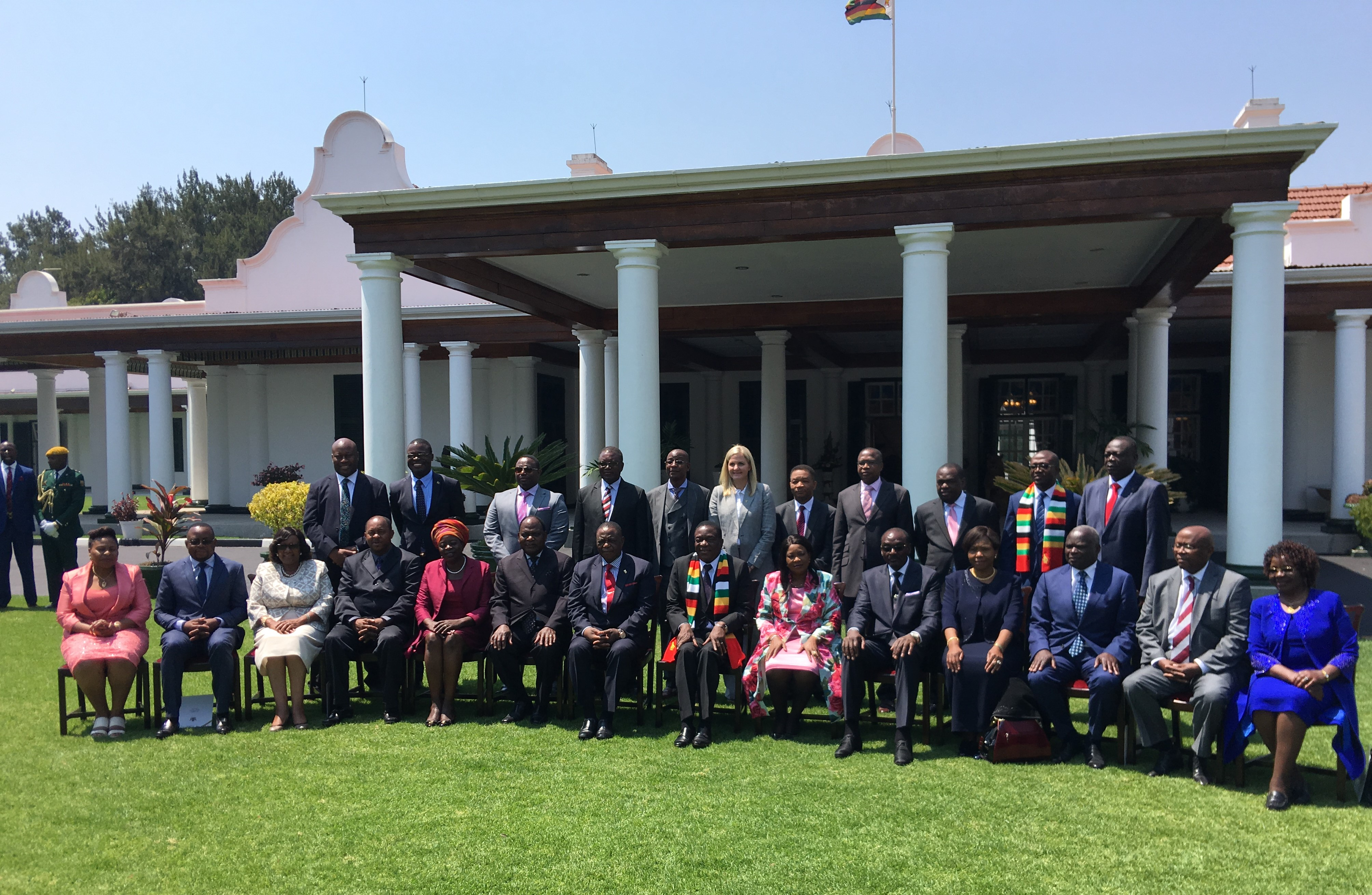
- 2018 Cabinet after swearing in
- Date formed: 26 August 2018
- Date dissolved: 22 August 2023

People and organisations
- President: Emmerson Mnangagwa
- First Vice-President: Constantino Chiwenga
- Second Vice-President: Kembo Mohadi
- No. of ministers: 22
- Member party: ZANU-PF
- Status in legislature: Majority
- Opposition party: MDC Alliance
- Opposition leader: Nelson Chamisa; Disputed

History
- Election: 30 July 2018
- Legislature term: 9th Parliament
- Predecessor: First Cabinet of Emmerson Mnangagwa
- Successor: Third Cabinet of Emmerson Mnangagwa

The second cabinet of Emmerson Mnangagwa was the government of Zimbabwe following the 2018 general election until the dissolution of Parliament on 22 August 2023, ahead of the 2023 general election. President Emmerson Mnangagwa announced its formation on 7 September 2018. The newly appointed ministers and their deputies were sworn in on 10 September 2018.

== History ==
Zimbabwean president Emmerson Mnangagwa was sworn in for his first full term on 26 August 2018 following his disputed re-election in the 2018 Zimbabwean presidential election. On 30 August 2018, Mnangagwa reappointed Constantino Chiwenga as First Vice-President and Kembo Mohadi as Second Vice-President.

Mnangagwa announced the formation of his second cabinet on 7 September 2018. The new cabinet initially consisted of 20 members.

All the newly appointed ministers and their deputies were sworn in on 10 September 2018,. The Constitution of Zimbabwe only permits the President to appoint seven non-Parliamentary members to Cabinet.

On 8 November 2019, Mnangagwa announced a Cabinet reshuffle, moving several ministers to different ministries, and replacing others. The Ministry of Local Government, Public Works and National Housing was split in two, creating a new Ministry of National Housing and Social Amenities and the Ministry of Local Government and Public Works. Seven deputy minsiters were appointed.

== Cabinets ==
=== 10 September 2018 – 8 November 2019 ===
First Cabinet of Second Mnangagwa Ministry
Portfolio	Portrait	Minister	Term
Cabinet ministers
President of Zimbabwe; Commander-in-Chief of the Zimbabwe Defence Forces		His Excellency President Dr. Emmerson Mnangagwa	2017 – present
First Vice-President of Zimbabwe		Hon. General (Rtd) Dr Constantino Chiwenga	2017 – present
Second Vice-President of Zimbabwe		Hon. Col (Rtd) Kembo Mohadi	2017 – 2021
Chief Secretary to the President and Cabinet		Dr Misheck Sibanda	2003 – 2023
Minister of State in Vice-President Chiwenga's Office		Hon. Evelyn Ndlovu	2018 – 2021
Minister of State in Vice-President Mohadi's Office		Hon. Davis Marapira	2018 – 2021
Minister of Defence and War Veterans		Hon. Oppah Muchinguri	2018 – present
Minister of Energy and Power Development		Hon. Joram Gumbo	2018 – 2019
Minister of Environment, Tourism and Hospitality Industry		Hon. Prisca Mupfumira	2018 – 2019
Minister of Finance and Economic Development		Hon. Prof. Mthuli Ncube	2018 – present
Minister of Foreign Affairs and International Trade		Hon. Lt. Gen. (Rtd) Sibusiso Moyo	2017 – 2021
Minister of Health and Child Care		Hon. Dr. Obadiah Moyo	2018 – 2020
Higher and Tertiary Education, Science and Technology		Hon. Prof. Amon Murwira	2017 – 2024
Minister of Home Affairs and Cultural Heritage		Hon. Cain Mathema	2018 – 2019
Minister of Industry and Commerce		Hon. Mangaliso Ndlovu	2018 – 2019
Minister of Information Communication Technology and Courier Services		Hon. Kazembe Kazembe	2018 – 2019
Minister of Information, Publicity and Broadcasting Services		Hon. Monica Mutsvangwa	2018 – 2023
Minister of Justice, Legal and Parliamentary Affairs		Hon. Ziyambi Ziyambi	2017 – present
Lands, Agriculture, Water, Climate and Rural Resettlement		Hon. Air Chief Marshal (Rtd) Perrance Shiri	2018 – 2020
Minister of Local Government, Public Works and National Housing		Hon. July Moyo	2018 – 2019
Minister of Mines and Mining Development		Hon. Winston Chitando	2018 – 2023
Minister of Primary and Secondary Education		Hon. Prof. Paul Mavima	2018 – 2019
Minister of Public Service, Labour and Social Welfare		Hon. Sekesai Nzenza	2018 – 2019
Minister of Transport and Infrastructural Development		Hon. Joel Biggie Matiza	2018 – 2021
Minister of Women Affairs, Community, Small and Medium Enterprises Development		Hon. Sithembiso Nyoni	2018 – 2023
Minister of Youth, Sport, Arts and Recreation		Hon. Kirsty Coventry	2018 – 2025

=== 8 November 2019 – 22 August 2023 ===
Second Cabinet of Second Mnangagwa Ministry
Portfolio	Portrait	Minister	Term
Cabinet ministers
President of Zimbabwe; Commander-in-Chief of the Zimbabwe Defence Forces		His Excellency President Dr. Emmerson Mnangagwa	2017 – present
First Vice-President of Zimbabwe		Hon. General (Rtd) Dr Constantino Chiwenga	2017 – present
Second Vice-President of Zimbabwe		Hon. Col (Rtd) Kembo Mohadi	2017 – 2021
Chief Secretary to the President and Cabinet		Dr Misheck Sibanda	2003 – 2023
Minister of State for National Security		Hon. Owen Ncube	2019 – 2022
Minister of State for Presidential Affairs in Charge of Implementation and Monitoring		Hon. Joram Gumbo	2019 – 2023
Minister without Portfolio in the Office of the President and Cabinet		Hon. Prof. Cain Mathema	2021 – 2023
Minister of State in Vice-President Chiwenga's Office		Hon. Evelyn Ndlovu	2018 – 2021
Minister of State in Vice-President Chiwenga's Office		Hon. Sibangumuzi Sixtone Khumalo	2021 – 2023
Minister of State in Vice-President Mohadi's Office		Hon. Davis Marapira	2018 – 2021
Minister of Defence and War Veterans		Hon. Oppah Muchinguri	2018 – present
Minister of Energy and Power Development		Hon. Fortune Chasi	2019 – 2020
Minister of Energy and Power Development		Hon. Soda Zhemu	2020 – 2023
Minister of Environment, Climate Change, Tourism and Hospitality Industry		Hon. Mangaliso Ndlovu	2019 – 2024
Minister of Finance and Economic Development		Hon. Prof. Mthuli Ncube	2018 – present
Minister of Foreign Affairs and International Trade		Hon. Lt. Gen. (Rtd) Sibusiso Moyo	2017 – 2021
Minister of Foreign Affairs and International Trade		Hon. Frederick Shava	2021 – 2024
Minister of Health and Child Care		Hon. Dr. Obadiah Moyo	2018 – 2020
Minister of Health and Child Care		Hon. General (Rtd) Dr Constantino Chiwenga	2020 – 2023
Higher and Tertiary Education, Science and Technology		Hon. Prof. Amon Murwira	2017 – 2024
Minister of Home Affairs and Cultural Heritage		Hon. Kazembe Kazembe	2019 – present
Minister of Industry and Commerce		Hon. Sekesai Nzenza	2019 – 2023
Minister of Information Communication Technology and Courier Services		Hon. Jenfan Muswere	2019 – 2023
Minister of Information, Publicity and Broadcasting Services		Hon. Monica Mutsvangwa	2018 – 2023
Minister of Justice, Legal and Parliamentary Affairs		Hon. Ziyambi Ziyambi	2017 – present
Lands, Agriculture, Water, Climate and Rural Resettlement		Hon. Air Chief Marshal (Rtd) Perrance Shiri	2018 – 2020
Minister of Local Government and Public Works		Hon. July Moyo	2019 – 2023
Minister of Mines and Mining Development		Hon. Winston Chitando	2018 – 2023
Minister of National Housing and Social Amenities		Hon. Daniel Garwe	2019 – 2024
Minister of Primary and Secondary Education		Hon. Prof. Cain Mathema	2019 – 2021
Minister of Primary and Secondary Education		Hon. Evelyn Ndlovu	2021 – 2023
Minister of Public Service, Labour and Social Welfare		Hon. Paul Mavima	2019 – 2023
Minister of Transport and Infrastructural Development		Hon. Joel Biggie Matiza	2018 – 2021
Minister of Transport and Infrastructural Development		Hon. Felix Mhona	2021 – present
Minister of Women Affairs, Community, Small and Medium Enterprises Development		Hon. Sithembiso Nyoni	2018 – 2023
Minister of Youth, Sport, Arts and Recreation		Hon. Kirsty Coventry	2018 – 2025

== List of ministers ==
Member of the House of Assembly	Member of the Senate	Non-Parliamentary Minister (Note: Constitutionally limited to seven in the Cabinet, not including the President, Vice-Presidents, and their secretaries.)
Cabinet ministers are listed **in bold** while deputies are not

=== The Office of the President and Cabinet (OPC) ===
The Office of the President and Cabinet
Post	Minister	Term
President of Zimbabwe; Commander-in-Chief of the Zimbabwe Defence Forces	His Excellency President Dr **Emmerson Mnangagwa**	24 November 2017 – present
First Vice-President of Zimbabwe	Hon. General (Rtd) Dr **Constantino Chiwenga**	28 December 2017 – present
Second Vice-President of Zimbabwe	Hon. Col (Rtd) **Kembo Mohadi**	28 December 2017 – 1 March 2021
Chief Secretary to the President and Cabinet	Dr Misheck Sibanda	5 May 2003 – 26 September 2023
Minister without Portfolio in the Office of the President and Cabinet	Hon. Prof. **Cain Mathema**	30 September 2021 – 22 August 2023
Minister of State in Vice-President Chiwenga's Office	Hon. Evelyn Ndlovu	10 September 2018 – 30 September 2021
Minister of State in Vice-President Chiwenga's Office	Hon. Sibangumuzi Sixtone Khumalo	20 October 2021 – 22 August 2023
Minister of State in Vice-President Mohadi's Office	Hon. Davis Marapira	10 September 2018 – 1 March 2021
Minister of State for National Security	Hon. Owen Ncube	8 November 2019 – 10 January 2022
Minister of State for Presidential Affairs in Charge of Implementation and Monitoring	Hon. Joram Gumbo	8 November 2019 – 22 August 2023

=== Departments of state ===
Defence and War Veterans
Minister of Defence and War Veterans	Hon. **Oppah Muchinguri**	10 September 2018 – present
Deputy Minister of Defence and War Veterans	Hon. Victor Matemadanda	10 September 2018 – 25 March 2021

Energy and Power Development
Minister of Energy and Power Development	Hon. **Joram Gumbo**	10 September 2018 – 8 November 2019
Minister of Energy and Power Development	Hon. **Fortune Chasi**	8 November 2019 – 14 August 2020
Minister of Energy and Power Development	Hon. **Soda Zhemu**	14 August 2020 – 22 August 2023
Deputy Minister of Energy and Power Development	Hon. Magna Mudyiwa	10 September 2018 – 22 August 2023

Environment, Tourism and Hospitality Industry
Minister of Environment, Tourism and Hospitality Industry	Hon. **Prisca Mupfumira**	10 September 2018 – 8 August 2019
Environment, Climate Change, Tourism and Hospitality Industry
Minister of Environment, Climate Change, Tourism and Hospitality Industry	Hon. **Mangaliso Ndlovu**	8 November 2019 – 8 March 2024
Deputy Minister of Environment, Climate Change, Tourism and Hospitality Industry	Hon. Barbara Rwodzi	2 December 2021 – 22 August 2023

Finance, Economic Development and Investment Promotion
Minister of Finance & Investment Promotion	Hon. Prof. **Mthuli Ncube**	10 September 2018 – present
Deputy Minister of Finance & Investment Promotion	Hon. Clemence Chiduwa	8 November 2019 – 22 August 2023

Foreign Affairs and International Trade
Minister of Foreign Affairs	Hon. Lt. Gen. (Rtd) **Sibusiso Moyo**	4 December 2017 – 20 January 2021
Minister of Foreign Affairs	Hon. **Frederick Shava**	2 March 2021 – 15 October 2024
Deputy Minister of Foreign Affairs	Hon. David Musabayana	8 November 2019 – 22 August 2023

Health and Child Care
Minister of Health and Child Care	Hon. Dr. **Obadiah Moyo**	10 September 2018 – 7 July 2020
Minister of Health and Child Care	Hon. General (Rtd) Dr **Constantino Chiwenga**	4 August 2020 – 22 August 2023
Deputy Minister of Health and Child Care	Hon. Dr. John Mangwiro	10 September 2018 – 22 August 2023

Higher and Tertiary Education, Science and Technology
Minister of Higher and Tertiary Education, Science and Technology	Hon. Prof. **Amon Murwira**	1 December 2017 – 15 October 2024
Deputy Minister of Higher and Tertiary Education, Science and Technology	Hon. Raymore Machingura	8 November 2019 – 22 August 2023

Home Affairs and Cultural Heritage
Minister of Home Affairs and Cultural Heritage	Hon. **Cain Mathema**	10 September 2018 – 8 November 2019
Minister of Home Affairs and Cultural Heritage	Hon. **Kazembe Kazembe**	8 November 2019 – present
Deputy Minister of Home Affairs and Cultural Heritage	Hon. Michael Madiro	10 September 2018 – 8 February 2021
Deputy Minister of Home Affairs and Cultural Heritage	Hon. Ruth Mavhunga-Maboyi	10 September 2018 – 22 August 2023

Industry and Commerce
Minister of Industry and Commerce	Hon. **Mangaliso Ndlovu**	10 September 2018 – 8 November 2019
Minister of Industry and Commerce	Hon. **Sekesai Nzenza**	8 November 2019 – 22 August 2023
Deputy Minister of Industry and Commerce	Hon. Raj Modi	10 September 2018 – 22 August 2023

Information Communication Technology and Courier Services
Minister of Information Communication Technology and Courier Services	Hon. **Kazembe Kazembe**	10 September 2018 – 8 November 2019
Minister of Information Communication Technology and Courier Services	Hon. **Jenfan Muswere**	8 November 2019 – 22 August 2023
Deputy Minister of Information Communication Technology and Courier Services	Hon. Jenfan Muswere	10 September 2018 – 8 November 2019
Deputy Minister of Information Communication Technology and Courier Services	Hon. Dingumuzi Phuti	8 November 2019 – present

Information, Publicity and Broadcasting Services
Minister of Information, Publicity and Broadcasting Services	Hon. **Monica Mutsvangwa**	10 September 2018 – 22 August 2023
Deputy Minister of Information, Publicity and Broadcasting Services	Hon. Energy Mutodi	10 September 2018 – 20 May 2020
Deputy Minister of Information, Publicity and Broadcasting Services	Hon. Kindness Paradza	8 February 2021 – 22 August 2023

Justice, Legal and Parliamentary Affairs
Minister of Justice, Legal and Parliamentary Affairs	Hon. **Ziyambi Ziyambi**	1 December 2017 – present

Lands, Agriculture, Water, Climate and Rural Resettlement
Lands, Agriculture, Water, Climate and Rural Resettlement	Hon. Air Chief Marshal (Rtd) **Perrance Shiri**	4 December 2017 – 29 July 2020
Lands, Agriculture, Water, Climate and Rural Resettlement	Hon. Dr. **Anxious Masuka**	14 August 2020 – present
Deputy Minister of Lands, Agriculture, Fisheries and Rural Development	Hon. Vangelis Peter Haritatos	10 September 2018 – present
Deputy Minister of Lands, Agriculture, Fisheries and Rural Development	Hon. Douglas Karoro	10 September 2018 – 2 June 2022
Minister of State in charge of Monitoring the Implementation of Special Agricultural & Related Programmes; Initially in the OPC. Transferred to Lands on 21 June 2022	Hon. Davis Marapira	20 April 2021 – 22 August 2023

Local Government, Public Works and National Housing
Minister of Local Government, Public Works and National Housing	Hon. **July Moyo**	30 November 2017 – 8 November 2019
Deputy Minister of Local Government, Public Works and National Housing	Hon. Jennifer Mhlanga	30 November 2017 – 8 November 2019
Local Government and Public Works
Minister of Local Government and Public Works	Hon. **July Moyo**	8 November 2019 – 22 August 2023
Deputy Minister of Local Government and Public Works	Hon. Marian Chombo	8 November 2019 – 22 August 2023

Mines and Mining Development
Minister of Mines and Mining Development	Hon. **Winston Chitando**	4 December 2017 – 22 August 2023
Deputy Minister of Mines and Mining Development	Hon. Polite Kambamura	10 September 2018 – present

National Housing and Social Amenities
Minister of National Housing	Hon. **Daniel Garwe**	8 November 2019 – 24 April 2024
Deputy Minister of National Housing	Hon. Yeukai Simbanegavi	8 November 2019 – 24 April 2024

Primary and Secondary Education
Minister of Primary and Secondary Education	Hon. Prof. **Paul Mavima**	10 September 2018 – 8 November 2019
Minister of Primary and Secondary Education	Hon. **Cain Mathema**	8 November 2019 – 30 September 2021
Minister of Primary and Secondary Education	Hon. **Evelyn Ndlovu**	30 September 2021 – 22 August 2023
Deputy Minister of Primary and Secondary Education	Hon. Edgar Moyo	10 September 2018 – 22 August 2023

Public Service, Labour and Social Welfare
Minister of Public Service, Labour and Social Welfare	Hon. **Sekesai Nzenza**	10 September 2018 – 8 November 2019
Minister of Public Service, Labour and Social Welfare	Hon. **Paul Mavima**	8 November 2019 – 22 August 2023
Deputy Minister of Public Service, Labour and Social Welfare	Hon. Lovemore Matuke	10 September 2018 – 22 August 2023

Transport and Infrastructural Development
Minister of Transport and Infrastructure Development	Hon. **Joel Biggie Matiza**	10 September 2018 – 22 January 2021
Minister of Transport and Infrastructure Development	Hon. **Felix Mhona**	8 February 2021 – present
Deputy Minister of Transport and Infrastructure Development	Hon. Michael Madiro	8 February 2021 – 22 August 2023

Women's Affairs, Community, Small and Medium Enterprises Development
Minister of Women's Affairs, Community & SMEs	Hon. **Sithembiso Nyoni**	4 December 2017 – 22 August 2023
Deputy Minister of Women's Affairs, Community & SMEs	Hon. Jennifer Mhlanga	8 November 2019 – present

Youth, Sport, Arts and Recreation
Minister of Youth, Sport, Arts and Recreation	Hon. **Kirsty Coventry**	10 September 2018 – 25 March 2025
Deputy Minister of Youth, Sport, Arts and Recreation	Hon. Yeukai Simbanegavi	10 September 2018 – 8 November 2019
Deputy Minister of Youth, Sport, Arts and Recreation	Hon. Tinoda Machakaire	8 November 2019 – 22 August 2023

=== Provincial Affairs Ministers ===
Provincial Affairs Ministers
Bulawayo	Hon. **Judith Ncube**	10 September 2018 – present
Harare	Hon. **Oliver Chidawu**	8 March 2019 – 19 July 2022
Manicaland	Hon. **Ellen Gwaradzimba**	10 September 2018 – 15 January 2021
Manicaland	Hon. **Nokuthula Matsikenyere**	8 February 2021 – 22 August 2023
Mashonaland Central	Hon. **Monicah Mavhunga**	10 September 2018 – 22 August 2023
Mashonaland East	Hon. **Apollonia Munzverengwi**	10 September 2018 – 11 February 2025
Mashonaland West	Hon. **Mary Mliswa**	10 September 2018 – 22 August 2023
Masvingo	Hon. **Ezra Chadzamira**	10 September 2018 – present
Matabeleland North	Hon. **Richard Moyo**	10 September 2018 – present
Matabeleland South	Hon. **Abednico Ncube**	4 December 2017 – 22 August 2023
Midlands	Hon. **Larry Mavima**	10 September 2018 – 22 August 2023
