= First Cabinet of Emmerson Mnangagwa =

Interim Government of Zimbabwe 2017-2018

- Cabinet of Zimbabwe
- 2017–2018
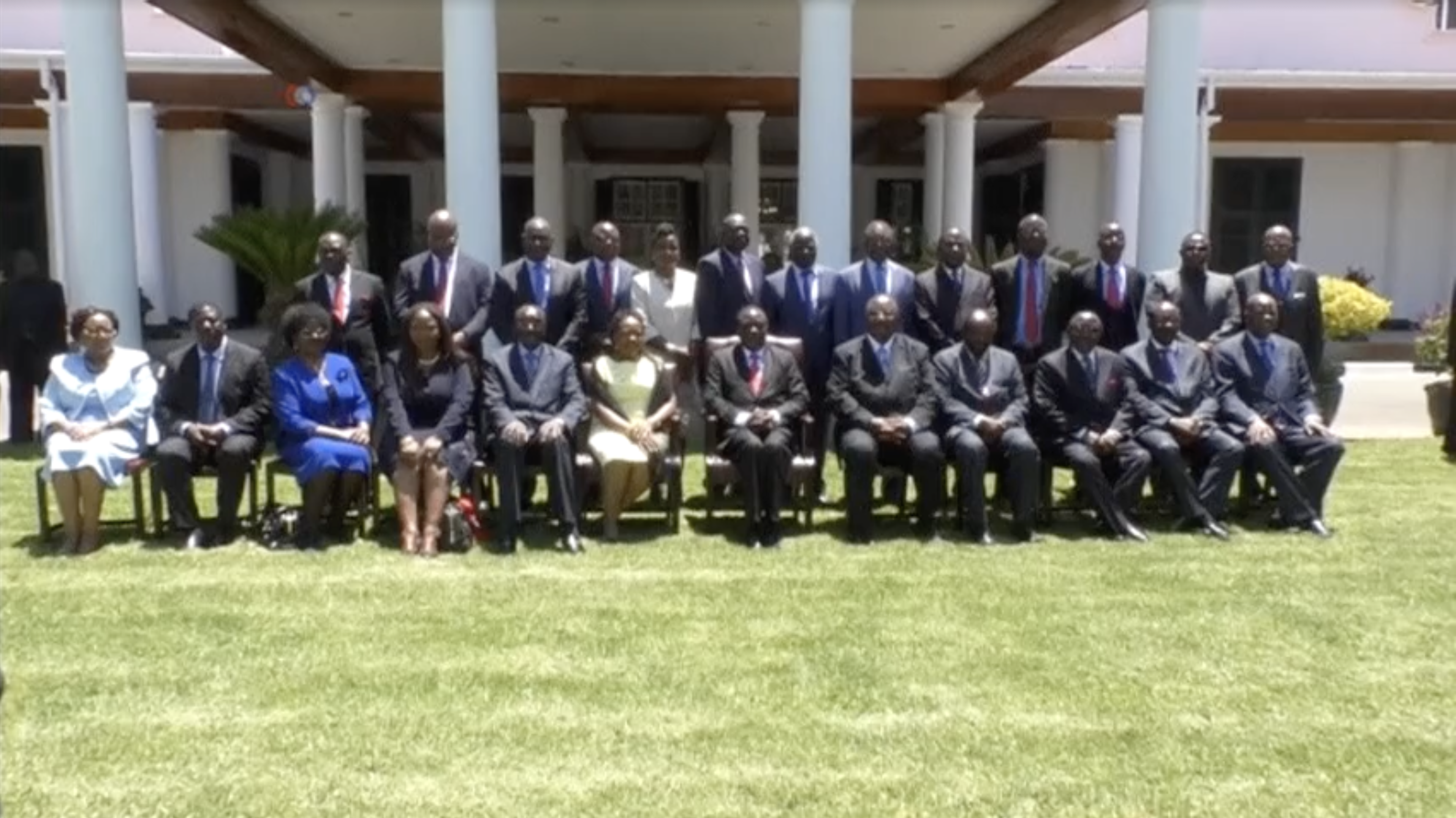
- 2017 Cabinet after being sworn in, December 2017
- Date formed: 4 December 2017
- Date dissolved: 29 July 2018

People and organisations
- President: Emmerson Mnangagwa
- First Vice-President: Constantino Chiwenga
- Second Vice-President: Kembo Mohadi
- Chief Secretary to the President and Cabinet: Misheck Sibanda
- No. of ministers: 20
- Member party: ZANU-PF
- Status in legislature: Majority
- Opposition party: MDC-T
- Opposition leader: Nelson Chamisa

History
- Election: 31 July 2013
- Legislature term: 8th Parliament
- Incoming formation: 2017 Zimbabwean coup d'état
- Predecessor: Eighth Cabinet of Robert Mugabe
- Successor: Second Cabinet of Emmerson Mnangagwa

The first cabinet of Emmerson Mnangagwa was the interim government of Zimbabwe following the 2017 Zimbabwean coup d'état until the dissolution of Parliament on 29 July 2018, ahead of the 2018 general election . President Emmerson Mnangagwa announced its formation on 30 November 2017. The newly appointed ministers and their deputies were sworn on 4 December 2017.

== History ==
Zimbabwean president Emmerson Mnangagwa was sworn in as president on 24 November 2017 following the 2017 Zimbabwean coup d'état which led to the resignation of previous president Robert Mugabe.

Mnangagwa announced the formation of his first cabinet on 30 November 2017. The initial announcement included appointments of several ministers who were neither in the House of Assembly nor the Senate. The Constitution of Zimbabwe however only permits the President to appoint seven non-Parliamentary members to Cabinet. As such, a second announcement was made on 2 December updating the list so that it would conform with the Constitution. Some of those initially appointed were retained as 'Special Advisors to the President'. All the newly appointed ministers and their deputies were sworn in on 4 December 2017. Only two Deputy Ministers were appointed in this cabinet.

On 23 December 2017 Mnangagwa appointed Constantino Chiwenga as First Vice-President and Kembo Mohadi as Second Vice-President. They were sworn in on 28 December 2017. Chiwenga was also appointed Minister responsible for Administration of the Ministry of Defence and War Veterans Affairs, succeeding Mohadi who had been made minister at the start of the month. Mohadi meanwhile was appointed Minister responsible for the National Peace and Reconciliation Portfolio.

== Cabinets ==
=== 4 December 2017 – 29 July 2018 ===
First Cabinet of First Mnangagwa Ministry
Portfolio	Portrait	Minister	Term
Cabinet ministers
President of Zimbabwe; Commander-in-Chief of the Zimbabwe Defence Forces		His Excellency President Dr. Emmerson Mnangagwa	2017 – present
First Vice-President of Zimbabwe		Hon. General (Rtd) Dr Constantino Chiwenga	2017 – present
Second Vice-President of Zimbabwe		Hon. Col (Rtd) Kembo Mohadi	2017 – 2021
Chief Secretary to the President and Cabinet		Dr Misheck Sibanda	2003 – 2023
Minister of State in the President's Office Responsible for National Scholarships		Hon. Christopher Mushohwe	2017 – 2018
Minister of Defence, Security and War Veterans		Hon. Col (Rtd) Kembo Mohadi	2017 – 2017
Minister of Defence, Security and War Veterans		Hon. General (Rtd) Dr Constantino Chiwenga as minister responsible	2017 – 2018
Minister of Energy and Power Development		Hon. Amb. Simon Khaya Moyo	2017 – 2018
Minister of Environment, Water and Climate		Hon. Oppah Muchinguri-Kashiri	2017 – 2018
Minister of Finance and Economic Planning		Hon. Patrick Chinamasa	2017 – 2018
Minister of Foreign Affairs		Hon. Lt. Gen. (Rtd) Sibusiso Moyo	2017 – 2021
Minister of Health and Child Care		Hon. Dr. David Parirenyatwa	2017 – 2021
Minister of Higher Education, Science and Technology Development		Hon. Prof. Amon Murwira	2017 – 2024
Minister of Home Affairs and Culture		Hon. Obert Mpofu	2017 – 2018
Minister of Industry, Commerce and Enterprise Development		Hon. Mike Bimha	2017 – 2018
Minister of Information Communication Technology and Cyber Security		Hon. Supa Mandiwanzira	2017 – 2018
Minister of Justice, Legal and Parliamentary Affairs		Hon. Ziyambi Ziyambi	2017 – present
Minister of Labour and Social Welfare		Hon. Petronella Kagonye	2017 – 2018
Minister of Lands, Agriculture and Rural Resettlement		Hon. Air Chief Marshal (Rtd) Perrance Shiri	2017 – 2020
Minister of Local Government, Public Works and National Housing		Hon. July Moyo	2017 – 2025
Minister of Mines and Mining Development		Hon. Winston Chitando	2017 – 2023
Minister of National Peace and Reconciliation		Hon. Col (Rtd) Kembo Mohadi as minister responsible	2018 – 2018
Minister for Presidential Affairs and Monitoring of Government Programmes		Hon. Simbarashe Mumbengegwi	2017 – 2018
Minister of Primary and Secondary Education		Hon. Prof. Paul Mavima	2017 – 2019
Minister of Sports, Arts and Recreation		Hon. Kazembe Kazembe	2017 – 2018
Minister of Tourism and Hospitality Industry		Hon. Prisca Mupfumira	2017 – 2018
Minister of Transport and Infrastructural Development		Hon. Dr. Joram Gumbo	2017 – 2018
Minister of Women and Youth Affairs		Hon. Sithembiso Nyoni	2017 – 2018

== List of ministers ==
Member of the House of Assembly	Member of the Senate	Non-Parliamentary Minister (Note: Constitutionally limited to seven in the Cabinet, not including the President, Vice-Presidents, and their secretaries.)
Cabinet ministers are listed **in bold** while deputies are not

=== The Office of the President and Cabinet (OPC) ===
The Office of the President and Cabinet
Post	Minister	Term
President of Zimbabwe; Commander-in-Chief of the Zimbabwe Defence Forces	His Excellency President Dr **Emmerson Mnangagwa**	24 November 2017 – present
First Vice-President of Zimbabwe	Hon. General (Rtd) Dr **Constantino Chiwenga**	28 December 2017 – present
Second Vice-President of Zimbabwe	Hon. Col (Rtd) **Kembo Mohadi**	28 December 2017 – 1 March 2021
Chief Secretary to the President and Cabinet	Dr Misheck Sibanda	5 May 2003 – 26 September 2023
Minister of State in the President's Office Responsible for National Scholarships	Hon. Christopher Mushohwe	4 December 2017 – 29 July 2018
Special Advisor on Disability Issues in the Office of the President and Cabinet	Hon. Joshua Teke Malinga	4 December 2017 – 29 July 2018
Special Advisor to the President	Hon. Amb. Christopher Mutsvangwa	4 December 2017 – 29 July 2018
Special Advisor to the President on National Peace and Reconciliation	Hon. Prof. Clever Nyathi	4 December 2017 – 29 July 2018

=== Departments of state ===
Defence, Security and War Veterans
Minister of Defence	Hon. Col (Rtd) **Kembo Mohadi**	4 December 2017 – 28 December 2017
Minister of Defence	Hon. General (Rtd) Dr **Constantino Chiwenga** as minister responsible	28 December 2017 – 29 July 2018

Energy and Power Development
Minister of Energy and Power Development	Hon. Amb. **Simon Khaya Moyo**	4 December 2017 – 29 July 2018

Environment, Water and Climate
Minister of Environment, Water and Climate	Hon. **Oppah Muchinguri-Kashiri**	4 December 2017 – 29 July 2018

Finance and Economic Planning
Minister of Finance and Economic Planning	Hon. **Patrick Chinamasa**	4 December 2017 – 29 July 2018
Deputy Minister of Finance and Economic Planning	Hon. Terrence Mukupe	4 December 2017 – 29 July 2018

Foreign Affairs
Minister of Foreign Affairs	Hon. Lt. Gen. (Rtd) **Sibusiso Moyo**	4 December 2017 – 20 January 2021

Health and Child Care
Minister of Health and Child Care	Hon. Dr. **David Parirenyatwa**	4 December 2017 – 29 July 2018

Higher Education, Science and Technology Development
Minister of Higher Education and Tertiary Education	Hon. Prof. **Amon Murwira**	4 December 2017 – 15 October 2024

Home Affairs and Culture
Minister of Home Affairs and Culture	Hon. **Obert Mpofu**	4 December 2017 – 29 July 2018

Industry, Commerce and Enterprise Development
Minister of Industry, Commerce and Enterprise Development	Hon. **Mike Bimha**	4 December 2017 – 29 July 2018

Information Communication Technology and Cyber Security
Minister of Information Communication Technology and Cyber Security	Hon. **Supa Mandiwanzira**	4 December 2017 – 29 July 2018

Justice, Legal and Parliamentary Affairs
Minister of Justice, Legal and Parliamentary Affairs	Hon. **Ziyambi Ziyambi**	4 December 2017 – present

Labour and Social Welfare
Minister of Labour and Social Welfare	Hon. **Petronella Kagonye**	4 December 2017 – 29 July 2018

Lands, Agriculture and Rural Resettlement
Minister of Lands, Agriculture and Rural Resettlement	Hon. Air Chief Marshal (Rtd) **Perrance Shiri**	4 December 2017 – 29 July 2020
Deputy Minister of Lands, Agriculture and Rural Resettlement	Hon. Davis Marapira	4 December 2017 – 29 July 2018

Local Government, Public Works and National Housing
Minister of Local Government, Public Works and National Housing	Hon. **July Moyo**	4 December 2017 – 3 January 2025

Mines and Mining Development
Minister of Mines and Mining Development	Hon. **Winston Chitando**	4 December 2017 – 22 August 2023

National Peace and Reconciliation
Minister of National Peace and Reconciliation	Hon. Col (Rtd) **Kembo Mohadi** as minister responsible	28 December 2017 – 29 July 2018

Presidential Affairs and Monitoring of Government Programmes and Projects
Minister for Presidential Affairs and Monitoring of Government Programmes and Projects	Hon. **Simbarashe Mumbengegwi**	4 December 2017 – 29 July 2018

Primary and Secondary Education
Minister of Primary and Secondary Education	Hon. Prof. **Paul Mavima**	4 December 2017 – 8 November 2019

Sports, Arts and Recreation
Minister of Sports, Arts and Recreation	Hon. **Kazembe Kazembe**	4 December 2017 – 29 July 2018

Tourism and Hospitality Industry
Minister of Tourism and Hospitality Industry	Hon. **Prisca Mupfumira**	4 December 2017 – 29 July 2018

Transport and Infrastructural Development
Minister of Transport and Infrastructural Development	Hon. Dr. **Joram Gumbo**	4 December 2017 – 29 July 2018

Women and Youth Affairs
Minister of Women and Youth Affairs	Hon. **Sithembiso Nyoni**	4 December 2017 – 29 July 2018

=== Provincial Affairs Ministers ===
Provincial Affairs Ministers
Bulawayo	Hon. **Angeline Masuku**	4 December 2017 – 29 July 2018
Harare	Hon. **Miriam Chikukwa**	11 September 2013 – 29 July 2018
Manicaland	Hon. **Monica Mutsvangwa**	4 December 2017 – 29 July 2018
Mashonaland Central	Hon. **Martin Dinha**	11 September 2013 – 29 July 2018
Mashonaland East	Hon. **David Musabayana**	4 December 2017 – 29 July 2018
Mashonaland West	Hon. **Webster Shamu**	9 October 2017 – 29 July 2018
Masvingo	Hon. **Josiah Hungwe**	4 December 2017 – 29 July 2018
Matabeleland North	Hon. **Cain Mathema**	4 December 2017 – 29 July 2018
Matabeleland South	Hon. **Abednico Ncube**	4 December 2017 – 22 August 2023
Midlands	Hon. **Owen Ncube**	4 December 2017 – 29 July 2018
