= Evelyn Ndlovu =

Zimbabwean politician

The Honourable Evelyn Ndlovu MP

Minister of Environment, Climate and Wildlife
- Incumbent
- Assumed office 11 April 2025
- President: Emmerson Mnangagwa
- Deputy: John Paradza
- Preceded by: Sithembiso G.G. Nyoni

Member of Parliament for Matabeleland South Women's Quota
- Incumbent
- Assumed office 26 August 2018
- President: Emmerson Mnangagwa

Minister of State for Provincial Affairs and Devolution for Matabeleland South
- In office 12 September 2023 – 11 April 2025
- President: Emmerson Mnangagwa
- Preceded by: Abednico Ncube
- Succeeded by: Albert Nguluvhe

Minister of Primary and Secondary Education
- In office 30 September 2021 – 22 August 2023
- President: Emmerson Mnangagwa
- Deputy: Edgar Moyo
- Preceded by: Cain Mathema
- Succeeded by: Torerai Moyo

Minister of State in the Office of Vice-President Constantino Chiwenga
- In office 10 September 2018 – 30 September 2021
- President: Emmerson Mnangagwa
- Vice President: Constantino Chiwenga
- Preceded by: Clifford Sibanda
- Succeeded by: Sibangumuzi Khumalo

Personal details
- Party: ZANU–PF
- Spouse: Siqhoza Mathias Ndlovu

Evelyn Ndlovu is a Zimbabwean politician. She is currently the Minister of Environment, Climate and Wildlife. Formerly, until April 2025, she was the Minister of State for Matebeleland South and previous to that held the role of Minister of Primary and Secondary Education of Zimbabwe. She remains a member of parliament. She is a member of ZANU–PF.

== Career ==
She was appointed to the Zimbabwe Parliament in 2018 as the proportional representative for Bulilima and Mangwe Districts.

== Personal life ==
Ndlovu comes from Malalume village in Bulilima District of Matebeleland South Province in Zimbabwe. Her parents were Tomole Dabengwa Moyo and Mtubane Mkhwebu. She is married to Siqhoza Mathias Ndlovu, who is also a ZANU-PF politician. They have three children.
