= Mangaliso Ndlovu =

Zimbabwean parliamentarian and minister (born 1980)

The Honourable Mangaliso Ndlovu

Minister of Industry and Commerce
- Incumbent
- Assumed office 8 March 2024
- President: Emmerson Mnangagwa
- Deputy: Raj Modi
- Preceded by: Sithembiso Nyoni
- In office 10 September 2018 – 8 November 2019
- President: Emmerson Mnangagwa
- Preceded by: Michael Bimha
- Succeeded by: Sekai Nzenza

Minister of Environment, Climate and Wildlife
- In office 8 November 2019 – 8 March 2024
- President: Emmerson Mnangagwa
- Deputy: John Paradza
- Preceded by: Priscah Mupfumira
- Succeeded by: Sithembiso Nyoni

Member of Parliament for Bulilima East
- In office 26 August 2018 – 22 August 2023
- President: Emmerson Mnangagwa
- Preceded by: Mathias Ndlovu
- Succeeded by: Constituency suppressed

Personal details
- Born: 16 November 1980 (age 45) Bulawayo, Zimbabwe
- Party: ZANU-PF
- Education: National University of Science and Technology, Zimbabwe

Nqobizitha Mangaliso Ndlovu (born 16 November 1980) is a Zimbabwean parliamentarian and minister. He is affiliated with ZANU–PF and represented the constituency of Bulilima East. He is ZANU-PF Matabeleland South Provincial Chairman, and he served as the Minister of Industry and Commerce, and Enterprise Development following the 2018 election. In November 2019, he was appointed as Zimbabwe's Minister of Environment, Climate Change, Tourism and Hospitality Industry, replacing Prisca Mupfumira. In September 2023, he was appointed Minister of Environment, Climate, and Wildlife. In March 2024 following cabinet reshuffle, Ndlovu was appointed Minister of Industry and Commerce.

== Awards ==
In March 2023, Ndhlovu won the best African Minister of Tourism Award at the world's largest Travel and Tourism Trade Fair at the Internationale Tourism Bourse 2023.
