= Sithembiso Nyoni =

Zimbabwean politician (born 1949)

The Honourable Dr. Sithembiso Nyoni MP
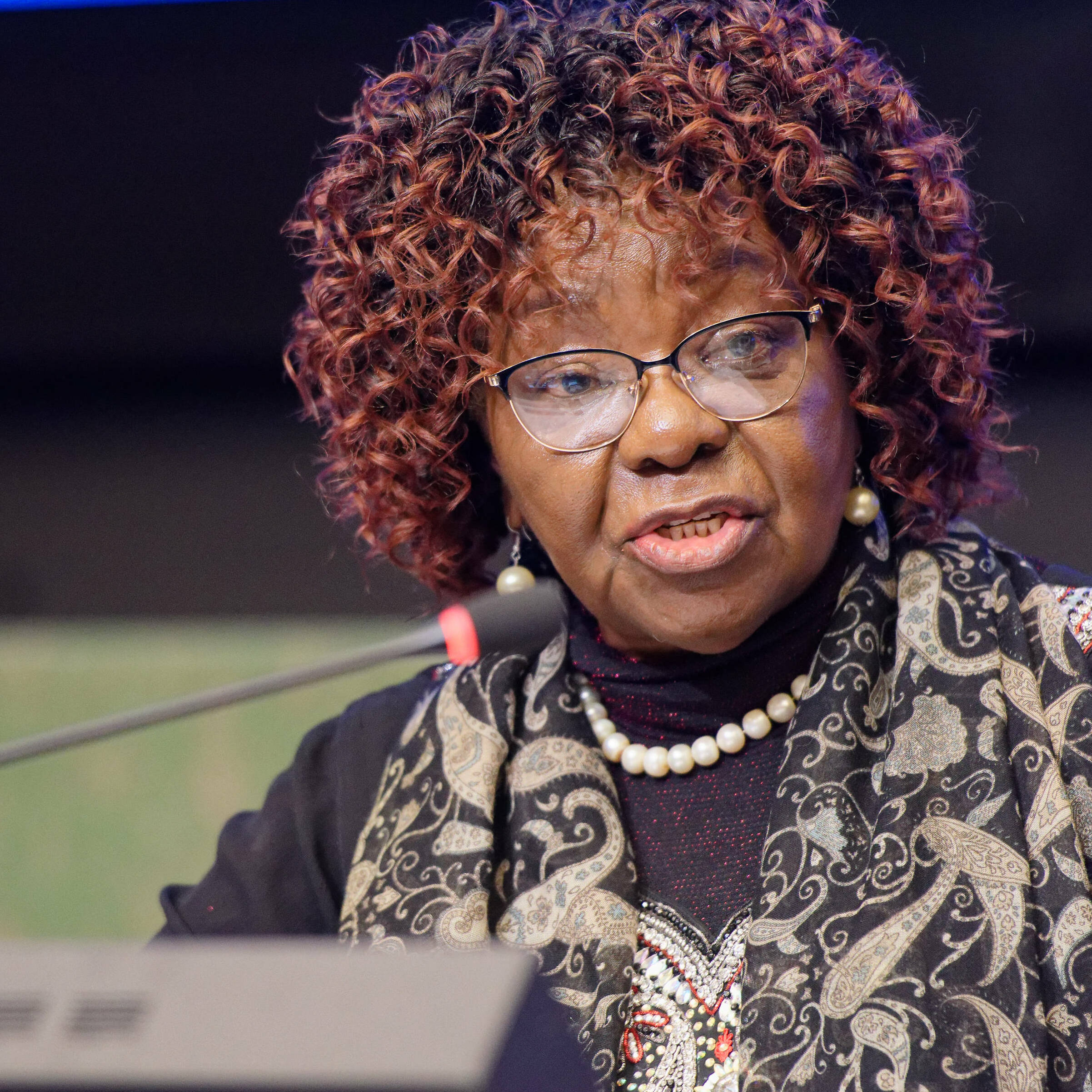
- Sithembiso Nyoni at UNCTAD eWeek in Geneva in 2023

Member of Parliament for Nkayi North
- Incumbent
- Assumed office 25 August 2008
- President: Robert Mugabe; Emmerson Mnangagwa
- Prime Minister: Morgan Tsvangirai (2009-2013)
- Constituency: Nkayi North
- Majority: 1,427 (10.6%)

Minister of Environment, Climate and Wildlife
- In office 8 March 2024 – 3 April 2025
- President: Emmerson Mnangagwa
- Deputy: John Paradza
- Preceded by: Mangaliso Ndlovu
- Succeeded by: Evelyn Ndlovu

Minister of Industry and Commerce
- In office 12 September 2023 – 8 March 2024
- President: Emmerson Mnangagwa
- Deputy: Roy Bhila; Raj Modi
- Preceded by: Sekai Nzenza
- Succeeded by: Mangaliso Ndlovu

Minister for Women Affairs, Community, Small and Medium Enterprise Development
- In office 10 September 2018 – 22 August 2023
- President: Emmerson Mnangagwa
- Preceded by: Nyasha Chikwinya
- Succeeded by: Monica Mutsvangwa

Personal details
- Born: 20 September 1949 (age 77) Silobela District
- Party: ZANU-PF
- Education: University of Zimbabwe

Sithembiso Gile Gladys Nyoni (born 20 September 1949) is a Zimbabwean politician and in 2023 the Industry and Commerce minister. She was a Minister of Small and Medium Enterprises Development and the minister of Women and Youth Affairs. On 3 April 2025 Dr. Nyoni was removed from post by President Emmerson Mnangagwa.

== Political career ==
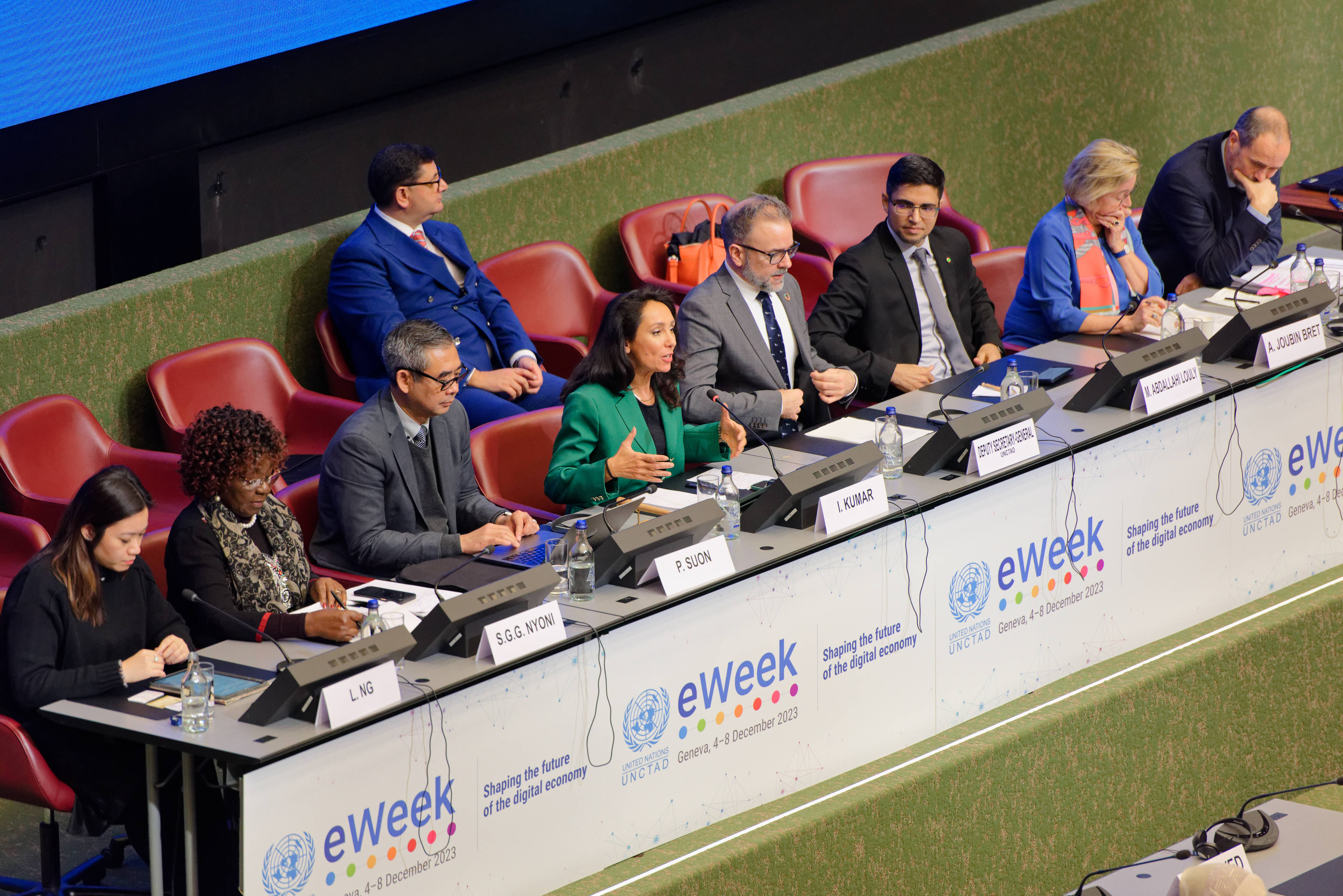
at UNCTAD eWeek in Geneva 2023

In the March 2008 parliamentary election, Nyoni was elected to the House of Assembly as the ZANU-PF candidate in Nkayi North. She received 4,634 votes against 4,234 for Moyo Talent of the Movement for Democratic Change (MDC)-Mutambara faction and 1,075 for Mlilo Thembinkosi of the MDC-Tsvangirai faction.

The Herald reported on January 3, 2009, that Nyoni had been dismissed from the Cabinet earlier in the week, along with 11 other ministers, because she no longer held any seat in Parliament. This report was wrong as she was the MP for Nkayi North and was therefore still eligible to be a Minister. On 1 December 2017 President Emmerson Mnangagwa elected a new Cabinet, Cde Sithembiso Nyoni became the new Minister of Women and Youth Affairs.

She was on the United States sanctions list from 2003 until 2014.

In October 2023 she, as Industry and Commerce minister, was warning foreigners that they need a license to operate retail businesses.
