= Albert Nguluvhe =

Zimbabwean politician

The Honourable Albert Nguluvhe MP

Minister of State for Provincial Affairs and Devolution for Matabeleland South
- Incumbent
- Assumed office 11 April 2025
- President: Emmerson Mnangagwa
- Preceded by: Evelyn Ndlovu

Member of Parliament for Beitbridge East
- Incumbent
- Assumed office 26 August 2018
- President: Emmerson Mnangagwa
- Preceded by: Kembo Mohadi
- Constituency: Beitbridge East
- Majority: 3,009 (21.1%)

Personal details
- Born: 11 November 1958 (age 67) Beitbridge
- Party: ZANU-PF

Albert Nguluvhe is a Zimbabwean politician. He is the current Minister of State for Provincial Affairs and Devolution for Matabeleland South and a member of parliament. He is a member of ZANU–PF.
