= Joshua Sacco =

Zimbabwean politician (born 1978)

The Hon. Joshua Sacco MP

Deputy Minister of Transport and Infrastructure Development
- Incumbent
- Assumed office 14 September 2023
- President: Emmerson Mnangagwa
- Minister: Felix Mhona
- Preceded by: Mike Madiro

Member of Parliament for Chimanimani East
- Incumbent
- Assumed office 26 August 2018
- President: Emmerson Mnangagwa
- Preceded by: Samuel Undenge
- Constituency: Chimanimani East
- Majority: 10,630 (46.2%)

Personal details
- Born: 22 August 1978 (age 48) Cape Town, South Africa
- Party: ZANU–PF
- Spouse: Mercy Vhiki
- Children: 4
- Education: Mutare Boys' High School

Joshua Kurt Sacco (born 22 August 1978) is a Zimbabwean politician and former musician who was elected to the National Assembly of Zimbabwe in the 2018 general election. He represents the constituency of Chimanimani East as a member of ZANU–PF. He was re-elected in the 2023 general election. Sacco joined the government as the Deputy Minister of Transport and Infrastructure Development in September 2023.

== Early life and education ==
One of three children, Sacco was born on 22 August 1978 in Cape Town in the former Cape Province of South Africa. His parents, Robert Paul and Mary Elizabeth Sacco, were part of the anti-apartheid movement and members of the banned African National Congress. At the age of three, Sacco's parents moved the family to the newly independent Zimbabwe, seeking refuge from the apartheid government. They settled in the city of Melsetter (later Chimanimani) in the Manicaland Province, where his parents established the Nyahode Union Learning Centre, a non-profit learning centre.

Sacco attended Kwirire Primary School for his primary education and Nyahode High School for his secondary education. He did his Advanced Level (A-Level) at Mutare Boys' High School. Sacco had difficulty learning and speaking the Shona language, particularly the Ndau dialect, while attending school, but later managed to learn and speak the language fluently. After graduating from high school, he worked for his parents' learning centre before establishing a sawmill business.

== Musical career ==
Sacco started his musical career at the Nyahode High School, where he sang in the school choir. He later formed the Radiation Band, which produced revolutionary music, and the band competed in the United Nations Development Programme's Artists Against Poverty competition. The band performed at ZANU–PF rallies between 1999 and 2000. The band's songs "Chenjera" and "Ivhu" were in support of the government's land redistribution programme in the early 2000s.

== Political career ==
Sacco joined ZANU–PF, Zimbabwe's ruling party since independence in 1980, in 1999 at the cell level. A party branch is made up of 10 cells. He gradually rose through the party's ranks, serving on the District Committee and the National Youth League Executive Committee before becoming a member of the party's Central Committee.

In 2013, Sacco stood against incumbent Member of Parliament Samuel Undenge in the ZANU–PF primary election to determine the party's candidate for the Chimanimani East parliamentary constituency for that year's parliamentary election. Undenge won the primary election; however, Sacco disputed the result. Nonetheless, he campaigned for Undenge in the run-up to the general election, which Undenge won.

Undenge was later expelled from ZANU–PF, and Sacco was tasked by the party to superintend the constituency. He stood in the party primary in the constituency again and won the election to determine the party's candidate for the 2018 general election. Sacco was elected Member of Parliament for the constituency at the election as ZANU–PF retained its majority in the National Assembly.

In the aftermath of Cyclone Idai in March 2019, Sacco was accused of lying and deserting his constituents during the cyclone. Sacco denied the allegations and was defended by president Emmerson Mnangagwa and vice-president Constantino Chiwenga. In November of the same year, Sacco urged the national government to declare missing people from Cyclone Idai as deceased.

Sacco stood uncontested in the party primary election in March 2023 and was re-elected to the National Assembly at the general election held in August 2023. On 14 September 2023, Sacco was sworn in as the Deputy Minister of Transport and Infrastructure Development during a ceremony at State House in Harare following his appointment by Mnangagwa.

== Personal life ==
Sacco is married to Mercy Vhiki, one of the granddaughters of the late tribal chief Benjamin Muusha. They have four daughters together.

Sacco and his family are members of the Zion Christian Church (ZCC); he is the church's coordinator in Chimanimani.
