= Obert Mpofu =

Member of the Cabinet of Zimbabwe

The Right Honourable Obert Mpofu MP

Minister of Home Affairs and Culture
- In office 30 November 2017 – 11 September 2018
- President: Emmerson Mnangagwa

Minister of Home Affairs
- In office 9 October 2017 – 27 November 2017
- President: Robert Mugabe
- Preceded by: Ignatius Chombo

Minister of Macro-Economic Planning and Investment Promotion
- In office 11 September 2015 – 9 October 2017
- President: Robert Mugabe
- Preceded by: Elton Mangoma
- Succeeded by: Simbarashe Mumbengegwi

Minister of Transport, Communication and Infrastructural Development
- In office 10 September 2013 – 11 September 2015
- President: Robert Mugabe
- Preceded by: Nicholas Goche
- Succeeded by: Joram Gumbo

Minister of Mines and Mining Development
- In office 13 February 2009 – 10 September 2013
- President: Robert Mugabe
- Prime Minister: Morgan Tsvangirai
- Preceded by: Amos Midzi
- Succeeded by: Walter Chidhakwa

Minister of Industry and International Trade
- In office April 2005 – 13 February 2009
- President: Robert Mugabe
- Succeeded by: Welshman Ncube

Governor of Matabeleland North
- In office 2000–2005
- Preceded by: Welshman Mabhena
- Succeeded by: Sithokozile Mathuthu

Personal details
- Born: 12 October 1951 (age 75) Southern Rhodesia
- Party: ZANU-PF
- Children: Bukhosie Mkhokheli

Obert Moses Mpofu (born 12 October 1951) is a Zimbabwean politician, currently serving as the Secretary for Information Communication Technology (ICT) of the majority ZANU-PF political party. From December 2018 to September 2025 he served as the Secretary General of ZANU-PF. He previously had been a member of parliament and a cabinet member. He was Minister of Home Affairs from 2017 to September 2018, and before that was Minister of Macro-Economic Planning and Investment Promotion; Minister of Industry and International Trade; Minister of Mines and Mining Development; and Minister of Transport and Infrastructure Development. He was Minister of Home Affairs when the Cabinet of Zimbabwe was dissolved on 27 November 2017, but he was reappointed as Minister of Home Affairs and Culture in Mnangagwa's first cabinet on 30 November 2017. Mpofu was removed from the Zimbabwe cabinet in September 2018.

== Personal life ==
Obert Mpofu was a member of the Hwange community, he grew up in Matabeleland North Province in Jambezi Village in the Zambezi Valley of Hwange District. He was the younger brother of Robert Moses Mpofu, a war hero from the Zimbabwe War of Independence. Obert Mpofu also served in the Zimbabwe War of Independence crossing over into Zambia in 1967 to be trained, although he primarily served as a messenger.

He received a Bachelor of Commerce degree from the University of Delhi, MPS Masters in Policy Studies from the University of Zimbabwe, and a PhD in Policy Studies from Zimbabwe Open University.

== Political career ==
Mpofu was first elected to parliament in 1980 as the Provincial Member for Matabeleland North. He again served in parliament as a non-constituency member from 1987 to 1990. In 1990 he was elected to parliament from Bubi-Umguza where he served until 1999.

In 2000 he was appointed as the Governor of Matabeleland North Province, a post he held until 2008.

Mpofu was appointed as Minister of Industry and International Trade in mid-April 2005, following the March 2005 parliamentary election. He was placed on the United States sanctions list in 2003.

At the beginning of 2014, Mpofu was reported to be seeking nomination from ZANU-PF’s Matabeleland North provincial leadership for the position of party Chairman. It was reported that his main rival for the position was the Speaker of the Zimbabwean Parliament, Jacob Mudenda. It is believed that Mpofu was one of the earliest ZPRA guerillas to be trained for the Zimbabwean Liberation War way back in the 1960s.

== Ministry of Industry and Trade ==
Mpofu masterminded the freeze of basic commodities in Zimbabwe in mid-2007. He was appointed by Robert Mugabe to lead the price monitoring regime that was created following the price-freeze. He withdrew operating licenses from abattoirs across the country during the price freeze, a situation that resulted in beef becoming scarce in shops across the country. In early 2008, he initiated the idea of 'people's shops' government run retail shops that would sell products cheaply.

== Minister of Mines ==
When the ZANU-PF–MDC national unity government was sworn in on 13 February 2009, Mpofu became Minister of Mines.

== Minister of Transport and Infrastructure ==
Mpofu was appointed as Minister of Transport and Infrastructure in February 2014 and served until 2015.

== Minister of Macro-Economic Planning and Investment Promotion ==
Mpofu was Minister of Macro-Economic Planning and Investment Promotion from 2015 until 2017.

== Minister of Home Affairs ==
Mpofu was appointed as Minister of Home Affairs in October 2017. Following the dissolution of the Cabinet of Zimbabwe in November 2017, it was announced that Robert Mugabe's successor Emmerson Mnangagwa had allowed only Patrick Chinamasa and Simbarashe Mumbengegwi to remain as acting ministers of Finance and Foreign Affairs respectively until the appointment of a new cabinet. However, Mpofu was appointed as Minister of Home Affairs and Culture in the new cabinet. Mpofu was removed from the Mnangagwa Cabinet in September 2018, one of several more senior ministers who were dropped in the cabinet reshuffle.

== Member of Parliament ==
He was first elected in 1980 as the Provincial Member for Matabeleland North. From 1995 to 1999 he was the Member of Parliament from the former Bubi-Umguza Constituency. But Mpofu lost the seat in 2000 to an MDC-T candidate.

=== Umguza constituency ===
Mpofu was elected as the ZANU-PF candidate for the House of Assembly seat from Umguza constituency in the 2004 election. Mpofu was again nominated for that post in March 2008 parliamentary election. Mpofu was initially endorsed as unopposed, but Mark Mbayiwa challenged this in court and was successful in getting Mpofu's unopposed endorsement overturned.

Campaigning in Umguza, Mpofu singled out Simba Makoni as an agent of western imperialism.

Mpofu won the seat, receiving 7,065 votes and defeating two candidates of the two Movement for Democratic Change factions, Cornelius Mbayiwa (MDC-T) and Edmund Masuku (MDC-M), who respectively received 2,846 and 2,120 votes. He also defeated Mark Mbayiwa, who ran as an independent and received 555 votes.

He was elected again in 2013, but did not run in 2018, accepting instead a seat in the Senate.

=== Matabeleland North ===
In September 2018 Mpofu resigned as Matabeleland North's Senator.

== ZANU-PF positions ==
In December 2017 he was appointed as the Secretary for Administration of the ZANU-PF political party. After the party’s 2022 congress, which restored the position of Secretary General, he was appointed to that post. In September 2025 he was removed as Secretary General and made the party's Secretary for Information Communication Technology (ICT). He was succeeded as Secretary General by Jacob Mudenda.

Political offices
Preceded by Charles Tawengwa	Treasurer (Dura ReMusangano) ZANU	Next: incumbent
