= Giles Mutsekwa =

Zimbabwean politician (1948–2022)

The Right Honourable Giles Mutsekwa MP

Minister of Home Affairs of Zimbabwe
- In office 13 February 2009 – 2013 Serving with Kembo Mohadi
- Prime Minister: Morgan Tsvangirai

Personal details
- Born: 14 September 1948
- Died: 27 June 2022 (aged 73)
- Party: Movement for Democratic Change-Tsvangirai

Giles Mutsekwa (14 September 1948 – 27 June 2022) was a Zimbabwean politician.

He was appointed to the unity government as one of two co-ministers of Home Affairs by Prime Minister Morgan Tsvangirai in February 2009 and sworn into office on 13 February.

He concurrently served as secretary for Security and Intelligence of the MDC-T, and served as MP for Mutare North from 2000 to 2008. In 2010, he was reassigned and became Minister for Housing.

== Background ==
Earlier in his political career, he was a member of Zimbabwe Unity Movement and the Manicaland Provincial Chairman. He also joined The Democratic Party and was a founder member and National Chairman. He was also a trained soldier with various military awards, which include General Service Medal – Bronze Cross of Zimbabwe. He has held several posts in the army including the post of Officer CADET (UK) 1978–1979 and in 1983 he was promoted to the rank of captain. He also participated in the Military campaigns of Mozambique between 1982–86. He was one of the most senior MDCT members in Manicaland.

He died from COVID-19 in 2022.
