= Sibusiso Moyo =

Sibusiso Moyo may refer to the following:

- Sibusiso Moyo (politician), Zimbabwean politician (1960–2021)
- Sibusiso Moyo (professor), Deputy Vice-Chancellor: Research, Innovation and Postgraduate Studies of Stellenbosch University
