= Felix Mhona =

Zimbabwean politician

The Honourable Felix Mhona MP

Minister of Transport and Infrastructural Development
- Incumbent
- Assumed office 8 February 2021
- President: Emmerson Mnangagwa
- Deputy: Mike Madiro (2021-2023); Joshua Sacco
- Preceded by: Joel Biggie Matiza

Member of Parliament for Chikomba East
- Incumbent
- Assumed office 4 September 2023
- President: Emmerson Mnangagwa
- Preceded by: Irene Nzenza Kanhutu
- Constituency: Chikomba East
- Majority: 5,886 (31.9%)

Member of Parliament for Chikomba Central
- In office 22 August 2013 – 22 August 2023
- President: Emmerson Mnangagwa
- Preceded by: Moses Jiri
- Succeeded by: Constituency suppressed
- Constituency: Chikomba Central

Personal details
- Born: 12 May 1974 (age 52) Chegutu
- Party: ZANU-PF
- Education: Nottingham Trent University; Zimbabwe Open University

Felix Mhona is a Zimbabwean politician. He is the current Minister of Transport and Infrastructural Development of Zimbabwe and a member of parliament. He is a member of ZANU–PF.
