= Michael Bimha =

Zimbabwean politician (born 1954)

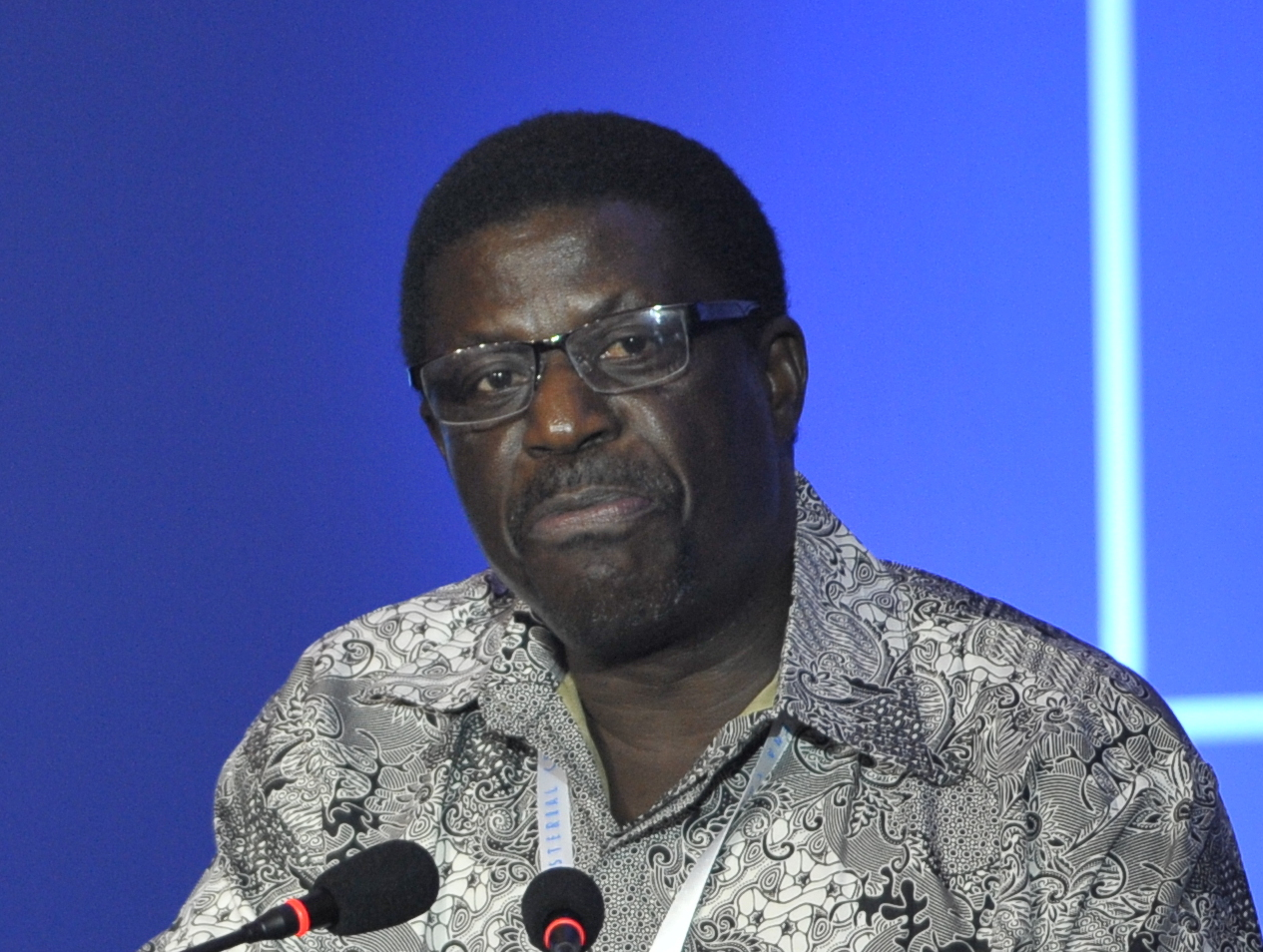
Michael Bimha at a WTO conference in Bali, December 2013.

Michael Chakanaka Bimha (born 1954) is a Zimbabwean politician and former Minister of State for Industry and Commerce and former Deputy Minister of Industry and Commerce. He is the member of House of Assembly for Chikomba West (ZANU-PF). He is a previous chairman of Air Zimbabwe. In 2013, following Zanu PF's victory in the country elections, Bimha was appointed Minister of Industry and Commerce, replacing Welshman Ncube.
