= Beitbridge East =

Constituency of the Parliament of Zimbabwe

- Constituency for the National Assembly of Zimbabwe
- Province: Matabeleland South
- Region: Beitbridge District

Current constituency
- Seats: 1
- Party: ZANU–PF
- Member: Albert Nguluvhe

Beitbridge East is a constituency represented in the National Assembly of the Parliament of Zimbabwe, located in Beitbridge District in Matabeleland South Province. It is currently represented since the 2018 election by Albert Nguluvhe of ZANU–PF. Previously, it was represented by Kembo Mohadi.

== Members ==
Election	Name	Party
2008	Kembo Mohadi	ZANU–PF
2013	Kembo Mohadi	ZANU–PF
2018	Albert Nguluvhe	ZANU–PF
2023	Albert Nguluvhe	ZANU–PF

== See also ==
- List of Zimbabwean parliamentary constituencies
