= Ministry of Transport and Infrastructural Development =

Government ministry of Zimbabwe

Ministry overview
- Preceding agencies: Ministry of Transport, Communication and Infrastructural Development (2009-2013); Ministry of Transport and Infrastructural Development (pre-2009)
- Jurisdiction: Government of Zimbabwe
- Headquarters: 16th Floor Kaguvi Building, Corner Central Ave and Simon Muzenda St, Harare; 17.82366°S 31.05391°E
- Minister responsible: Felix Mhona, Minister of Transport and Infrastructural Development
- Deputy Minister responsible: Joshua Sacco, Deputy Minister of Transport and Infrastructural Development
- Website: transcom.gov.zw

The Ministry of Transport and Infrastructural Development is the government ministry of Zimbabwe responsible for the management of transport and infrastructure and services within the country. Felix Mhona has been the minister since February 2021.

During the period of the Government of National Unity, the ministry was known as the Ministry of Transport, Communication and Infrastructural Development. Then-president Robert Mugabe allocated oversight of the Interception of Communications Act to Nicholas Goche, who was the Minister of Transport at the time and a Mugabe loyalist. The Ministry of Information and Communications Technology was led by Nelson Chamisa, a Tsvangirai loyalist.

== Subsidiary units ==
The Ministry oversees the following parastatal organisms:

- National Railways of Zimbabwe
- Zimbabwe United Passenger Company (ZUPCO)
- Air Zimbabwe
- Zimbabwe National Roads Administration

== Leaders ==
=== Ministers ===
- 2009 – 2014 Nicholas Goche
- 2014 – 2015 Obert Mpofu
- 2015 – 2018 Joram MacDonald Gumbo
- September 2018 – January 2021, Joel Matiza.
- from February 2021 – Felix Mhona.

=== Deputy ministers ===
- The deputy minister from 2009 was Tichaona Mudzingwa until his death in early April 2012.
- Deputy minister until May 2019 was Fortune Chasi,
- From February 2021 the deputy minister is Michael Madiro.

== See also ==
- Politics of Zimbabwe
- Transport in Zimbabwe
