= Chikomba Central =

Constituency of the Parliament of Zimbabwe

- Former constituency for the National Assembly of Zimbabwe
- Province: Mashonaland East (previously Midlands)
- Region: Chikomba District

Former constituency
- Abolished: 2023

Chikomba Central was a constituency represented in the National Assembly of the Parliament of Zimbabwe, located in Chikomba District in Mashonaland East Province. It was most recently represented by Felix Mhona of ZANU–PF until it was dissolved prior to the 2023 general election.

== Members ==
Election	Name	Party
1990	Tadius Kudzedzereka	ZANU–PF
1994 by-election	Solomon Mujuru	ZANU–PF
1995	Solomon Mujuru	ZANU–PF
2000	Chenjerai Hunzvi	ZANU–PF
2001	Bernard Makokove	ZANU–PF
2005	Tichaona Jokonya	ZANU–PF
2006	Steven Chiurayi	ZANU–PF
2008	Moses Jiri	MDC–T
2013	Felix Mhona	ZANU–PF
2018	Felix Mhona	ZANU–PF
