= Environmental Management Agency in Zimbabwe =

Statutory body in Zimbabwe

The Environmental Management Agency in Zimbabwe is a statutory body responsible for ensuring the sustainable utilization of natural resources and protection of the environment, and comes up with plans to prevent pollution and environmental degradation. It is under the Ministry of Environment, Water and Climate. Its mission is to regulate, monitor and promote the sustainable management of natural resources and protection of the environment with stakeholder participation. The agency raises awareness in schools through talk shows, among other strategies.

== Overview ==
EMA was established under the Environmental Management Act(Chapter 20:27) of 2002 of the Zimbabwe Constitution. The act was operationalized on 17 March 2003 through Statutory Instrument 103 of 2003. The Government has chipped in working hand in glove with the Ministry of Environment, Tourism, and Hospitality Industry, and the EMA to create a healthy environment through the National Clean up Day as amended by the Constitution of Zimbabwe. EMA has two operational departments, which are: Environment Protection (EP) and Environmental Management Services (EMS). EP provides environmental protection and laboratory analytical services, while EMS provides environmental research, planning, and monitoring, as well as environmental education and information dissemination.
