= Chimanimani East =

Constituency of the Parliament of Zimbabwe

- Constituency for the National Assembly of Zimbabwe
- Province: Manicaland
- Region: Chimanimani

Current constituency
- Seats: 1
- Party: ZANU–PF
- Member(s): Joshua Sacco
- Created from: Chimanimani

Chimanimani East is a constituency represented in the National Assembly of the Parliament of Zimbabwe, located in Manicaland Province. Since the 2018 general election, Joshua Sacco of ZANU–PF is the constituency's Member of Parliament.

== See also ==
- List of Zimbabwean parliamentary constituencies
