= Gutu West =

- Constituency for the National Assembly of Zimbabwe
- Province: Masvingo
- Region: Gutu District

Current constituency
- Seats: 1
- Party: ZANU–PF
- Member(s): John Paradza

Gutu West is a constituency represented in the National Assembly of the Parliament of Zimbabwe, located in Gutu District in Masvingo Province. Its current MP since the 2023 election is John Paradza of ZANU–PF. It is predominantly Karanga, Ndau and Hera (Manyika subgroup) constituency.

== History ==
In an 11 November 2023 election, John Paradza retained the seat for ZANU–PF, winning 12,147 votes against 1,775 for independent candidate Sebastian Mudzingwa, 1,258 for Ephraim Morudu of the Citizens Coalition for Change, and 138 for Robson Kurwa of the National Constitutional Assembly. Initially scheduled to be held as part of the August 2023 general election, the vote was delayed until November due to the death of one of the candidates, Christopher Mutonho.

== See also ==
- List of Zimbabwean parliamentary constituencies
