= Minister of State for Provincial Affairs and Devolution for Matabeleland South =

Ministerial post in Zimbabwe

- Incumbent; Albert Nguluvhe since 11 April 2025
- Minister of State for Provincial Affairs
- Style: The Honourable
- Member of: Cabinet of Zimbabwe; Parliament of Zimbabwe
- Reports to: The President
- Seat: New Government Complex, Gwanda
- Appointer: The President
- Term length: Five years, renewable for a second or subsequent term of office
- Constituting instrument: Provincial Councils and Administration Act (Chapter 29:11)
- Precursor: Provincial Governor of Matabeleland South
- Formation: 22 August 2013
- Deputy: Permanent Secretary for Provincial Affairs and Devolution
- Website: testdomain10.gov.zw

The Minister of State for Provincial Affairs and Devolution for Matabeleland South is the Provincial Minister of State for Matabeleland South in Zimbabwe. The minister oversees provincial affairs and sits in the Parliament of Zimbabwe. The minister is appointed by the President of Zimbabwe and is appointed for a term of five years, which can be renewed for a second or subsequent term. Historically, the minister held the title Governor of Matabeleland South, but the office has since been renamed to align with the 2013 Constitution of Zimbabwe, which does not allow for Provincial Governors.

== List of Ministers ==
Parliamentary position: Elected Member of the House of Assembly Elected Member of the Senate Non-Elected Minister

No.	Name Birth–Death	Term in office	Party	Appointed by
Provincial Governors
	Mark Dube (Note: Dube was elected MP to the House of Assembly in 1980. He was a Senator following the 1985 elections. The Senate was abolished in 1987.); 3 April 1935–28 July 2004	2 March 1984 – 1 January 1993	ZANU-PF	Robert Mugabe
	Stephen Nkomo; 3 October 1926–20 April 2003	1 January 1993 – 20 April 2003	ZANU-PF	Robert Mugabe
	Angeline Masuku b. 14 October 1936	1 December 2003 – 28 June 2013	ZANU-PF	Robert Mugabe
Ministers of State for Provincial Affairs
	Abednico Ncube b. 13 April 1954	25 August 2013 – 9 October 2017	ZANU-PF	Robert Mugabe
	Aaron Maboyi Ncube	9 October 2017 – 21 November 2017	ZANU-PF	Robert Mugabe
	Abednico Ncube b. 13 April 1954	4 December 2017 – 22 August 2023	ZANU-PF	Emmerson Mnangagwa
	Evelyn Ndlovu	12 September 2023 – 11 April 2025	ZANU-PF	Emmerson Mnangagwa
	Albert Nguluvhe b. 11 November 1958	11 April 2025 – present	ZANU-PF	Emmerson Mnangagwa

== See also ==
- List of current provincial governors of Zimbabwe
