= Petronella Kagonye =

Zimbabwean politician

Minister of Labour and Social Welfare

Personal details
- Party: ZANU–PF

Petronella Kagonye is a Zimbabwean politician. She was the former Minister of Minister of Labour and Social Welfare of Zimbabwe and a member of parliament. She is a member of ZANU–PF.
