= Ministry of Defence (Zimbabwe) =

Government ministry of Zimbabwe

- Flag of the Zimbabwe Defence Forces

Department overview
- Formed: 18 April 1980 (of Zimbabwe); 1994 (integrated Ministry of Defence); 12 September 2023 (present form)
- Preceding Department: Ministry of Defence and War Veterans
- Jurisdiction: Government of Zimbabwe
- Headquarters: Defence House, Corner Kwame Nkuruma / 3rd Street, Harare
- Annual budget: ZiG12,332,381,967 (US$460,596,605) FY2025
- Minister responsible: Oppah Muchinguri, Minister of Defence
- Deputy Minister responsible: Levi Mayihlome, Deputy Minister of Defence
- Child Department: Joint Operations Command
- Key document: Constitution of Zimbabwe
- Website: www.defence.gov.zw

Minister of Defence of Zimbabwe
- Coat of arms of Zimbabwe
- Incumbent; Oppah Muchinguri since 10 September 2018
- Style: Defence Minister (informal); Honourable
- Reports to: President of Zimbabwe
- Appointer: President of Zimbabwe
- Term length: Five years
- Constituting instrument: Constitution of Zimbabwe
- Precursor: Minister of Defence of Zimbabwe Rhodesia
- Formation: 18 April 1980
- First holder: Robert Mugabe
- Deputy: Levi Mayihlome
- Website: www.defence.gov.zw

The Ministry of Defence is a Zimbabwe Government ministry, responsible for defence and national defence policy. The current incumbent minister is Oppah Muchinguri. Levi Mayihlome holds the portfolio of Deputy Minister of Defence. The Ministry is located in the capital of Harare.

It oversees the following uniformed services:

- Zimbabwe Defence Forces
  - Zimbabwe National Army
  - Air Force of Zimbabwe
- Zimbabwe Republic Police (joint with Ministry of Home Affairs)

It was established in July 1994 as the combined Zimbabwe Defence Forces Headquarters.

== Ministers ==
| No. | Name | Tenure | Title |
Southern Rhodesia (1923–1954)
| 1 | Robert James Hudson | 1 October 1923 – 5 July 1933 | Minister of Defence |
| 1 | Robert James Hudson | 5 July 1933 – 12 September 1933 | Minister of Justice and Defence |
| 2 | Stephen Martin Lanigan O'Keeffe | 12 September 1933 – 14 November 1934 | Minister of Defence |
| 3 | Vernon Arthur Lewis | 14 November 1934 – 6 October 1936 | Minister of Justice and Defence |
| 4 | Robert Clarkson Tredgold | 6 October 1936 – 12 January 1940 | Minister of Defence |
| 4 | Robert Clarkson Tredgold | 12 January 1940 – 28 March 1940 | Minister of Justice, Defence and Air |
| 4 | Robert Clarkson Tredgold | 28 March 1940 – 1 March 1943 | Minister of Justice and Defence |
| 5 | Sir Godfrey Huggins | 1 March 1943 – 2 February 1944 | Minister of Defence |
| 6 | Frank Ernest Harris | 2 February 1944 – 1 July 1945 | Minister of Defence |
| 7 | William Henry Ralston | 1 July 1945 – 7 June 1946 | Minister of Defence |
| 8 | Sir Ernest Lucas Guest | 7 June 1946 – 15 September 1948 | Minister of Defence and Air |
| – | Sir Godfrey Huggins | 19 November 1948 – 7 September 1953 | Minister of Defence |
| 9 | George Arthur Davenport | 7 September 1953 – 1 July 1954 | Minister of Defence |
Federation of Rhodesia and Nyasaland (1953–1963)
| 1 | Sir Godfrey Huggins | 7 September 1953 – 18 December 1953 | Minister of External Affairs and Defence |
| 1 | Sir Godfrey Huggins | 18 December 1953 – 2 November 1956 | Minister of Defence |
| 2 | Sir Roy Welensky | 2 November 1956 – 12 June 1959 | Minister of Defence |
| 3 | John Moore Caldicott | 12 June 1959 – 7 May 1962 | Minister of Defence |
| 4 | Sir Malcolm Palliser Barrow | 7 May 1962 – 31 December 1963 | Minister of Defence |
Southern Rhodesia (1964–1965)
| 10 | Winston Field | 1 January 1964 – 14 April 1964 | Minister of External Affairs and Defence |
| 11 | Ian Smith | 14 April 1964 – 8 May 1964 | Minister of External Affairs and Defence |
| 11 | Ian Smith | 8 May 1964 – 28 August 1964 | Minister of Defence |
| 12 | Clifford Dupont | 28 August 1964 – 17 November 1965 | Minister of Defence |
Rhodesia (UDI period, 1965–1979)
| – | Ian Smith | 17 November 1965 – 1966 | Minister of Defence |
| 13 | The Duke of Montrose | 1966 – 1968 | Minister of Defence |
| 14 | Jack Howman | 1968 – 1974 | Minister of Defence |
| 15 | P. K. van der Byl | 1974 – 1976 | Minister of Defence |
| 16 | Reginald Cowper | 1976 – 1977 | Minister of Defence |
| 17 | Mark Partridge | 1977 – 1977 | Minister of Defence |
| 18 | Roger Hawkins | 1977 – 11 December 1979 | Minister of Defence |
| 19 | John Kadzviti | 1978 – 11 December 1979 | Minister of Defence |
Zimbabwe Rhodesia (Internal Settlement period, 1979)
| 1 | Abel Muzorewa | 1 June 1979 – 11 December 1979 | Minister of Defence |
Zimbabwe (since 1980)
| 1 | Robert Mugabe | 1980 – 1985 | Minister of Defence |
| 2 | Enos Nkala | 1985 – 1990 | Minister of Defence |
| 3 | Richard Hove | 1990 – 1992 | Minister of Defence |
| 4 | Moven Mahachi | 1992 – 26 May 2001 | Minister of Defence |
| 5 | Sydney Sekeramayi | 2001 – 13 February 2009 | Minister of Defence |
| 6 | Emmerson Mnangagwa | 13 February 2009 – 11 September 2013 | Minister of Defence |
| – | Sydney Sekeramayi | 11 September 2013 – 27 November 2017 | Minister of Defence |
| 7 | Kembo Mohadi | 30 November 2017 – 29 December 2017 | Minister of Defence, Security and War Veterans |
| 8 | Constantino Chiwenga | 29 December 2017 – 11 September 2018 | Minister of Defence and War Veterans |
| 9 | Oppah Muchinguri | 11 September 2018 – 4 September 2023 | Minister of Defence and War Veterans |
| 9 | Oppah Muchinguri | 12 September 2023 – present | Minister of Defence |

=== Air ===
| No. | Name | Tenure | Title |
Southern Rhodesia
| 1 | Robert Clarkson Tredgold | 12 January 1940 – 28 March 1940 | Minister of Justice, Defence and Air |
| 2 | Ernest Lucas Guest | 28 March 1940 – 7 June 1946 | Minister of Air |
| 2 | Ernest Lucas Guest | 7 June 1946 – 15 September 1948 | Minister of Defence and Air |

== See also ==
- Zimbabwe Defence Forces
- Zimbabwe National Army
- Air Force of Zimbabwe
- Zimbabwe Republic Police
- Ministry of Home Affairs (Zimbabwe)
