= Fortune Chasi =

Zimbabwean politician

The Right Honourable Fortune Chasi MP
- In office 3 August 2018 – 2 August 2023
- President: Emmerson Dambudzo Mnangagwa
- Preceded by: Margaret Zinyemba

Deputy Minister of Transport & Infrastructural Development
- In office 10 September 2018 – 14 May 2019

Minister of Energy and Power Development
- In office 14 May 2019 – 14 August 2020
- Preceded by: Joram Gumbo
- Succeeded by: Soda Zhemu

Member of Parliament for Mazowe South
- Majority: 16,830

Personal details
- Born: February 5, 1965 (age 61) Mazowe
- Party: ZANU PF
- Education: University of Zimbabwe
- Profession: Politician; Lawyer
- Nickname: Chibabest

Fortune Chasi (born 5 February 1965) is a Zimbabwean politician, member of parliament, and formerly served as the country's Minister of Energy and Power Development. Fortune became member of parliament in Zimbabwe for Mazowe South in the 2013 Zimbabwean Parliamentary Elections. Fortune was appointed the Deputy Minister of Justice and Legal Affairs by President Robert Mugabe on 10 September 2013.

== Early years ==
Fortune was born and raised in Mazowe. He attended Kanyemba Primary School. He went to Founders High School, followed by studying to become a lawyer at the University of Zimbabwe.

== Professional career ==
Fortune is a lawyer and Senior Partner at Chasi & Maguwudze Law Firm, which is based in Harare. He is also a musician.

== Political career ==
Fortune became an elected Member of the Parliament of Zimbabwe, representing Mazowe South Constituency in Mashonaland Central Province on the 3rd. of August 2013. Hon. Fortune Chasi was sworn in on 11 September 2013, as the Deputy Minister of Justice, Legal and Parliamentary Affairs of Zimbabwe, under Hon. Emmerson Mnangagwa. Chasi was elevated to Minister of Energy and Power Development on 14 May 2019, in Mnangagwa’s Cabinet reshuffle, wherein his predecessor Joram Gumbo was moved to the President's Office. On 14 August 2020, Chasi was, with immediate effect, relieved off this cabinet post.
