= Joel Biggie Matiza =

Zimbabwean politician (1960–2021)

Minister of Transport and Infrastructural Development
- In office 25 September 2018 – 22 January 2021
- President: Emmerson Mnangagwa
- Preceded by: Joram Gumbo

Personal details
- Born: 17 August 1960 Murewa, Zimbabwe
- Died: 22 January 2021 (aged 60) Harare, Zimbabwe
- Party: ZANU–PF
- Education: Ahmadu Bello University; University of DerbyChinhoyi University of Technology

Joel Biggie Matiza (17 August 1960 – 22 January 2021) was a Zimbabwean politician and the Minister of Transport and Infrastructural Development since 2018. He died from COVID-19 on 22 January 2021.

== Early life and education ==
Matiza was born on 17 August 1960 in Murewa, Mashonaland East to a Shona family. The Herald (Zimbabwe) states that "He was the first born in a family of six children (four boys and two girls), his siblings being: Tendai and Zviko (twins), Sheila, Zivai and Tambirai. He enrolled for primary education at several primary schools, namely: Nyamutumbu and Kambarami (both in Murewa District) and Monte Casino Mission (Macheke) between 1966 and 1972. He then went to Murewa High School for secondary education in 1973 finishing Ordinary level in 1975."

His entry on the Parliament of Zimbabwe website states he studied O'levels and A'levels at the Nigerian Federal Government College in Kano, and then completed an Architecture BSc and MSc at Ahmadu Bello University. and graduated in 1987 He then gained a master's degree in Strategic Management from the University of Derby. In December 2020, Matiza received a Doctorate in Business Administration from Chinhoyi University of Technology.

== Revolutionary activity ==
Joel Matizas Zimbabwe Parliament entry states that he joined the Liberation Struggle 1977 (ZIPRA). The official Twitter page for the Ministry of Information, Publicity and Broadcasting Services, Zimbabwe states "Dr Joel Biggie Matiza was the ZANU PF Mash East Provincial Chairman & Minister of Transport and Infrastructural Development. Born in 1960 in Murewa, he joined the liberation struggle in 1975 and was deployed to various ZIPRA training camps. He was known as "Cde Destroyer Ndlovu". "After suffering injuries during a raid on Freedom Camp in Zambia, Cde Matiza was hospitalised for a long time before being identified as one of the intellects in the ranks qualifying for educational courses offered by friendly nations. He was sent to Nigeria to pursue his education."

== Career ==
After returning from his Nigerian education, Matiza worked for an architectural firm before being employed by the Urban Development Corporation (Udicorp).

The official page for the Ministry of Information, Publicity and Broadcasting Services, Zimbabwe states "He went on to hold several portfolios in ZANU PF and Government." In 1990, he successfully registered with the Architects Council of Zimbabwe (ACZ) and subsequently became a member of the Institute of Architects of Zimbabwe (MIAZ).

Joel Biggie Matiza was founding Chairman & CEO of Studio Arts Inc founded in founded in 1991. Projects include design work on the future New Zimbabwe Parliament Building and the upgrading of Victoria Falls Airport, which was completed in November 2016.

In 1999 Matiza was elected to the Zimbabwe Parliament from Murehwa South Constituency, where he served until his death. During the early 2000s as relations between Zimbabwe and Britain deteriorated Matiza advocated for more positive relations with the United Kingdom. During the election he campaigned in his district on the basis of "reconciling" with Britain. He said, "I have nothing against the British. Britain is Zimbabwe's natural ally and friend. I would like things to do back to the way they were before Tony Blair, with regards to our relationship with Britain. The people of England are great, our only disagreement is with Blair as an individual."

He was placed on the United States sanctions list from 2005 until his death.

In 2018, Matiza was appointed Minister of Transport and Infrastructural Development.

The Ministry of Transport, Communication and Infrastructural Development oversees the following parastatal organisms:

- National Railways of Zimbabwe
- Zimbabwe United Passenger Company (ZUPCO)
- Air Zimbabwe
- Zimbabwe National Roads Administration

== Death ==
Joel Biggie Matiza died from COVID-19 on 22 January 2021, during the COVID-19 pandemic in Zimbabwe, two days after fellow Minister Sibusiso Moyo. Matiza was hospitalised a week before he died. He became the 4th minister to succumb to the respiratory illness.
