= Constantino Chiwenga =

Vice-President of Zimbabwe

The Honourable Vice-President General (Rtd) Constantino Chiwenga
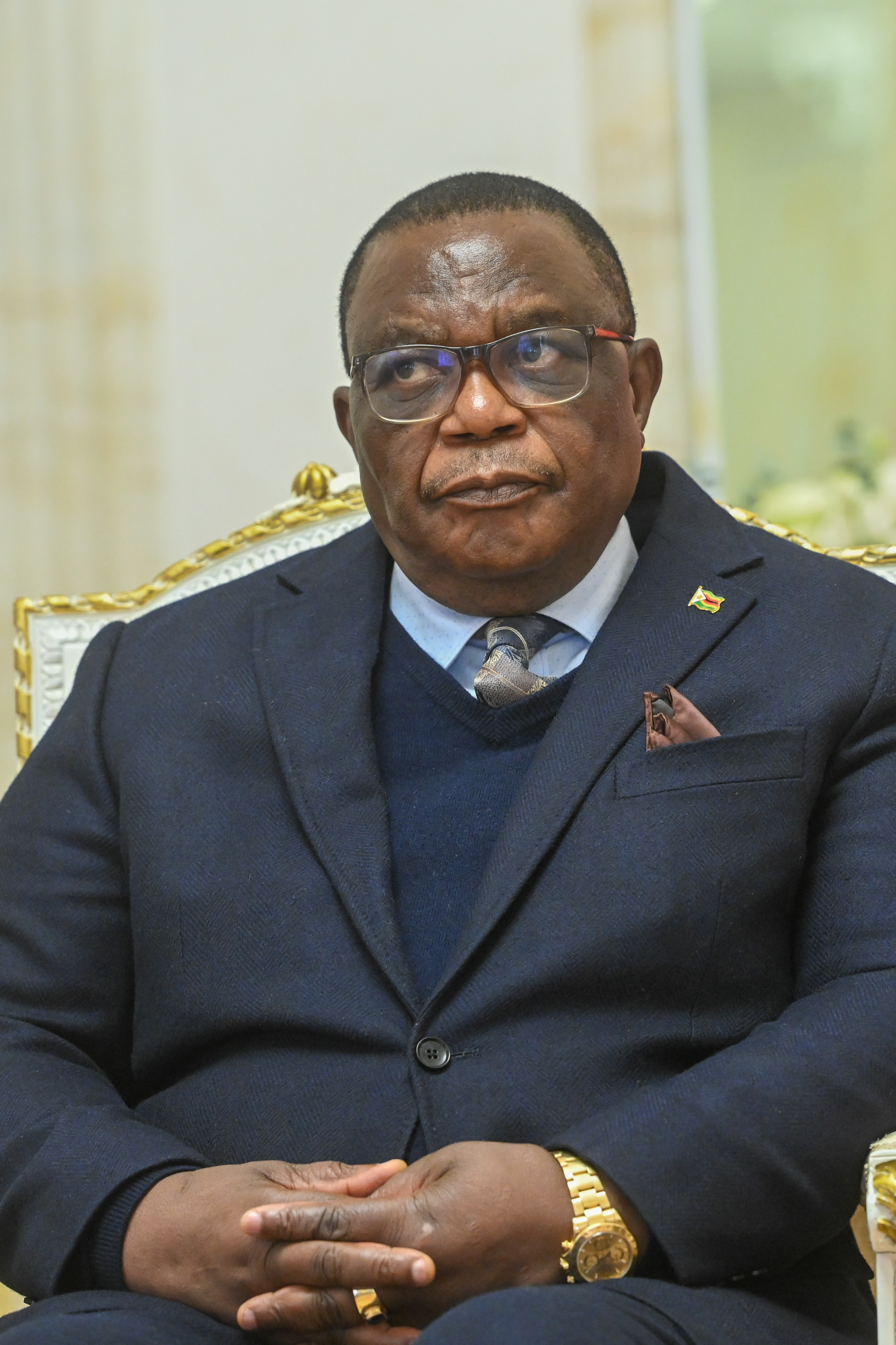
- Chiwenga in 2024

First Vice-President of Zimbabwe
- Incumbent
- Assumed office 28 December 2017
- President: Emmerson Mnangagwa
- Preceded by: Emmerson Mnangagwa

Minister of Health and Child Care
- In office 4 August 2020 – 22 August 2023
- President: Emmerson Mnangagwa
- Preceded by: Obadiah Moyo
- Succeeded by: Douglas Mombeshora

Minister of Defence and War Veterans
- In office 29 December 2017 – 11 September 2018
- President: Emmerson Mnangagwa
- Preceded by: Kembo Mohadi
- Succeeded by: Oppah Muchinguri-Kashiri

Vice-President and Second Secretary of ZANU-PF
- Incumbent
- Assumed office 23 December 2017 Serving with Kembo Mohadi
- President: Emmerson Mnangagwa
- Preceded by: Emmerson Mnangagwa

Commander of the Zimbabwe Defence Forces
- In office December 2003 – 19 December 2017
- President: Robert Mugabe; Emmerson Mnangagwa
- Preceded by: Vitalis Zvinavashe
- Succeeded by: Philip Valerio Sibanda

Commander of the Zimbabwe National Army
- In office 1994 – December 2003
- President: Robert Mugabe
- Succeeded by: Philip Valerio Sibanda

Personal details
- Born: Constantine Guveya Dominic Nyikadzino Chiwenga; 25 August 1956 (age 70) Wedza, Federation of Rhodesia and Nyasaland (now Hwedza, Zimbabwe)
- Party: ZANU–PF
- Spouses: Jocelyn Jacobsen (née Mauchaza) (m. 1998; div. 2012); Marry Mubaiwa (m. 2011; div. 2019); Colonel Miniyothabo Baloyi (m. 2022)
- Education: Political science
- Nickname: Dominic Chinenge

Military service
- Allegiance: Zimbabwe Defence Forces
- Branch/service: Zimbabwe African National Liberation Army (1973–1980); Zimbabwe National Army (1981–2017)
- Years of service: 1973–2017
- Rank: General
- Battles/wars: Rhodesian Bush War

Constantino Guveya Dominic Nyikadzino Chiwenga (born Constantine Chiwenga; 25 August 1956) is a Zimbabwean politician and former army general currently serving, since 2017, as the First Vice-President of Zimbabwe under President Emmerson Mnangagwa. In August 2020, he added the Health Ministry to his portfolio.

Since 2017, he has also been the Vice President and Second Secretary of the ruling Zimbabwean African National Union–Patriotic Front (ZANU-PF) jointly serving with Kembo Mohadi. In 2017, he was the most prominent military leader involved in successfully toppling Zimbabwe's President of 37 years Robert Mugabe in a bloodless coup.

== Personal life ==
Chiwenga was born in 1956 in Wedza District of Mashonaland East Province. He was educated up to O Level at St Mary's Mission in Hwedza, together with former students: Perrance Shiri, later Air Marshal, and Shungurirai, later Brigadier General and Commander Mechanised Brigade. Chiwenga went on to earn a PhD in Ethics from the University of KwaZulu-Natal in 2015. On 29 July 2016, he changed his name to Constantino Guveya Dominic Nyikadzino Chiwenga.

Chiwenga has been married and divorced several times. In 1998 he married Jocelyn Jacobsen (née Mauchaza) with a divorce in 2012. There were no children from his marriage to Jacobsen. In 2011 he married Marry (Mary) Mubaiwa, a former model, while still married to Jacobsen. In 2012 Marry bore their first child, a son, and a year later she bore a girl.

In 2019, suffering from an undisclosed ailment, Chiwenga checked into a South African hospital. A fracas arose when his wife Marry visited him. She was later charged with attempted murder, but was released on remand in 2026 after the trial collapsed.

In December 2019 Chiwenga filed for divorce from Marry. Chiwenga married Colonel Miniyothabo Baloyi, a serving member of the Zimbabwe National Army, in June 2022.

== Rhodesian Bush War ==
He joined the war in 1973 and was trained in Mozambique as a ZANLA militant. Chiwenga adopted the war name of "Dominic Chinenge". He rose through the ranks to become a Provincial Commander for Masvingo/Gaza Province deputised by George Chiweshe who was the Provincial Commissar. He was later promoted to the High Command in 1978 to the post of ZANLA Deputy Political Commissar as Josiah Tungamirai's deputy.

== Career in the Zimbabwe military ==
In 1981 he was attested to the newly formed Zimbabwe National Army as a brigadier commanding First Brigade in Bulawayo. He was later promoted to the rank of major general and reverted to his original name of Constantine Chiwenga.

In the early 1980s after failing basic Officers course at the Zimbabwe Staff College he bribed a junior officer to give him answers for practical Intermediate Staff Course. It is alleged that he accepted a green coded paper with suggested solutions which are available only after the exam. Chiwenga was expelled from the course after refusing to name the junior officer who had given him the paper. He then went on to shoot himself through the right shoulder in an attempt to end his life and was admitted at Parirenyatwa Hospital in Harare.

On the formation of Zimbabwe Defence forces (ZDF) in 1994 he was promoted to the rank of Lieutenant General and was appointed commander of the Zimbabwe National Army (ZNA). Upon the retirement of General Vitalis Zvinavashe in 2004, he was promoted to the rank of Commander of the Zimbabwe Defence Forces.

He is the chairman of the Joint Operations Command, which comprises the commanders of ZNA, Prison Services, Central Intelligence Organisation, Zimbabwe Republic Police and the Air Force of Zimbabwe. He participated actively during the Zimbabwe land reform programme, and is a beneficiary of the land seizures with a thriving farm near Harare. Since 2003, he and his wife are on the sanction list for those Zimbabwean officials not allowed to enter European Union and the United States (his wife was removed from the SDN list in 2016).

Zimbabwe's government announced on 18 December 2017 that Chiwenga was set to retire pending redeployment. He retired from the army on 19 December.

On 28 December 2017 Constantino Chiwenga was sworn in as co-vice president of the Republic of Zimbabwe, serving together with former Security minister Kembo Mohadi.

== 2017 coup d' état in Zimbabwe ==
The political crisis in Zimbabwe came to a head on 6 November 2017, when Vice President Emmerson Mnangagwa was dismissed by President Robert Mugabe. Mnangagwa fled the country two days later, citing "incessant threats" against his family. Chiwenga was on an official visit to China, where he learned that Mugabe had ordered his arrest upon his return to Zimbabwe. However, soldiers loyal to Chiwenga, disguised as baggage handlers, overpowered the police at the airport and cleared the way for his arrival on 12 November 2017.

On 13 November 2017, Chiwenga released a press statement chastising those responsible for the dismissals of government officials in the ruling ZANU-PF party. He warned that the armed forces would be forced to intervene should the "purging" not stop. In response, ZANU-PF's spokesperson Simon Khaya-Moyo released a press statement accusing Chiwenga of "treasonable conduct".

On 14 November it was reported that soldiers and armoured military vehicles were seen headed towards the capital, Harare. Several roads were later blocked in the city including the one leading to President Robert Mugabe's private residence, as well as one leading to the ZANU-PF aligned national broadcaster, Zimbabwe Broadcasting Corporation (ZBC). In the early hours of the next day the military spokesperson, the late Major General Sibusiso Moyo, appeared on ZBC Television announcing that the military had not taken over the country and that the president and his family were safe. He also announced that the armed forces would be "targeting criminals around him [Mugabe] who are committing crimes... that are causing social and economic suffering in the country". It was later reported that several ZANU-PF politicians and government ministers were detained or arrested, including the finance minister, Ignatius Chombo.

=== Alleged Chinese involvement ===
Days before the coup, Chiwenga visited China to meet senior Chinese military leaders, including Generals Chang Wanquan and Li Zuocheng. Chiwenga's visit to China has come under scrutiny, with speculation that he had sought Beijing's tacit approval for a possible move against Mugabe. However, the Chinese Foreign Ministry said that his visit was a "normal military exchange." The Chinese embassy in South Africa called the reports of Chinese involvement "self-contradictory, full of logical fallacies, and filled with evil intentions."

== Political career ==
The Presidential Press Secretary issued a statement on 23 December stating that President Emmerson Mnangagwa had appointed Chiwenga along with the then state-security minister Kembo Mohadi, as the Vice-Presidents of the ruling ZANU-PF party. Chiwenga and Mohadi were confirmed as the state Vice-Presidents on 27 December, with their swearing-in ceremony scheduled on the next day. He was appointed the Vice President of Zimbabwe on 28 December along with Mohadi, who was appointed the Second Vice-President. He was appointed the Minister of Defence and War Veterans Affairs on the next day.

Chiwenga was appointed Minister of Health and Child Care in August 2020. He succeeded Obadiah Moyo who was sacked a month earlier over corruption in awarding coronavirus testing contracts. Member of Parliament Tendai Biti said the appointment violates the constitution, which says the Vice President is not allowed to hold any other public office. Chiwenga inherited a corruption-ridden department with a disorganized response to the COVID-19 pandemic.

In January 2021, he presided at the burial service for three "heroes of the liberation struggle", Foreign Affairs Minister Sibusiso Moyo, Transport Minister Joel Biggie Matiza and former prisons chief Paradzai Zimondi, all of whom had died from COVID-19. Although Chiwenga called for unity in fighting the virus, he had yet to disclose a plan for vaccination, nor to identify the funds for paying for it.

In September 2023, following the parliamentary elections, he was reappointed First Vice President.

On 4 March 2024, the United States imposed sanctions on Chiwenga, President Mnangagwa, his wife Auxillia Mnangagwa, and 11 other Zimbabwean individuals and entities for involvement in human rights abuses, corruption, and minerals smuggling.

Military offices
Preceded by Vitalis Zvinavashe	Commander of the Zimbabwe National Army; 1994–2003	Succeeded by Philip Valerio Sibanda
Preceded by Vitalis Zvinavashe	Commander of the Zimbabwe Defence Forces; 2003–2017	Succeeded by Philip Valerio Sibanda
