= Priscah Mupfumira =

Zimbabwean politician

Prisca Mupfumira
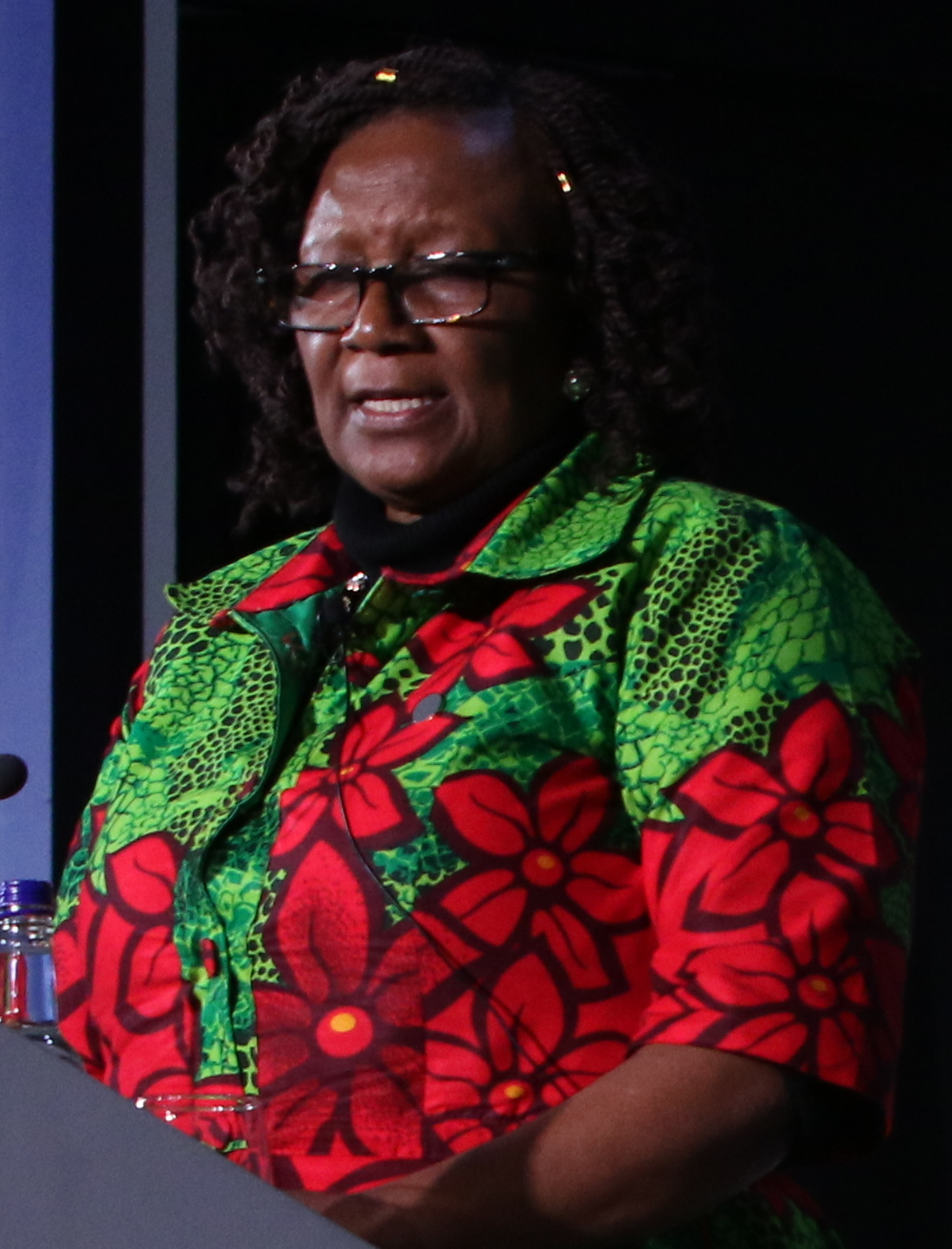
- Mupfumira in 2018

Minister of Tourism and Hospitality Industry
- In office December 2017 – August 2019
- President: Emmerson Mnangagwa
- Preceded by: Office established
- Succeeded by: Nqobizitha Mangaliso Ndlovu

Minister of Public Service, Labour and Social Welfare of Zimbabwe
- In office 2014 – 9 October 2017
- President: Robert Mugabe
- Preceded by: Nicholas Goche
- Succeeded by: Patrick Zhuwao

Personal details
- Party: ZANU–PF
- Occupation: politician and minister

Prisca Mupfumira, or Priscah Mupfumira, is a Zimbabwean politician and former government minister under President Robert Mugabe. When the President was replaced by Emmerson Mnangagwa, she was the first serving ZANU–PF minister to be arrested for corruption.

== Life ==
In 2013, Anna Simbanegavi, Fortune Charumbira and Mupfumira were promoted to the "Standing Orders and Rules Committee" (SORC).

In 2014, Mupfumira became the Minister of Public Service, Labour and Social Services. She was appointed by Mugabe to replace Nicholas Goche, who had been accused of trying to kill the President as part of a coup.

President Robert Mugabe reshuffled his cabinet in early July 2017, pointedly not including his wife. The Minister of Information, Jonathan Moyo, was moved to another ministry. He was not replaced, but Mupfumira was made responsible, even though she was still at the Ministry of Labor. Also, in July 2015, an American trophy hunter killed "Cecil the Lion" in Zimbanbwe using a bow and arrow. The event was said to be legal and became of interest to animal rights around the internet creating a global news story. Mupfumira, when questioned about Cecil's killing, asked, "What lion?"

On 9 October 2017, Patrick Zhuwao was appointed Minister of Public Service, Labour and Social Welfare of Zimbabwe. He announced on 10 November that government employees would be receiving bonuses. By the end of November 2017, Robert Mugabe had been swept aside and the new President Emmerson Mnangagwa announced his cabinet. He rewarded some leading soldiers who had assisted his move to power, but he did not sweep away Mugabe's former team. Mupfumira was part of the 22 minister cabinet and was named the Minister of Tourism and Hospitality Industry. After the 2018 parliamentary elections, Mupfumira was returned to cabinet, in the role of Minister of Tourism and Hospitality Industry.

In July 2019, she was arrested in connection with $94 million that was missing from a pension fund. She was the first ZANU–PF minister to be arrested by the new President Emmerson Mnangagwa. She did not lose her place in the cabinet for two weeks. She spent two months in jail before she was released on bail in September 2019. Meanwhile, a former vice-president, Phelekezela Mphoko, was also arrested for alleged corruption.

In February 2020, she and Ngoni Masoka, the ex-permanent secretary in the Ministry of Public Service and Social Welfare, were appealing decisions in the Zimbabwean courts related to the charges against them.
