= Ministry of Finance, Economic Development and Investment Promotion =

The Zimbabwean Ministry of Finance, Economic Development and Investment Promotion was split into two ministries in October 2026:

- Ministry of Finance (Zimbabwe)
- Ministry of Economic Development and Investment Promotion
