= Kazembe Kazembe =

Zimbabwean politician (born 1969)

The Honourable Kazembe Kazembe MP

Minister of Home Affairs and Cultural Heritage
- Incumbent
- Assumed office 8 November 2019
- President: Emmerson Mnangagwa
- Deputy: Chido Sanyatwe
- Preceded by: Cain Mathema

Member of Parliament of Mazowe West
- Incumbent
- Assumed office 22 August 2013
- President: Robert Mugabe; Emmerson Mnangagwa
- Preceded by: Richard Chirongwe
- Constituency: Mazowe West
- Majority: 20,476 (65.9%)

Minister of Information Communication Technology, Courier Services
- In office 7 September 2018 – 8 November 2019
- President: Emmerson Mnangagwa
- Preceded by: Supa Mandiwanzira
- Succeeded by: Jenfan Muswere

Minister of Sport, Arts and Recreation
- In office 30 November 2017 – 29th July 2018
- President: Emmerson Mnangagwa
- Preceded by: Andrew Langa
- Succeeded by: Kirsty Coventry

Personal details
- Born: 23 June 1969 (age 57) Dandamera, Concession
- Party: ZANU-PF
- Education: Africa University

Kazembe Raymond (Ray) Kazembe (born 23 June 1969) is a Zimbabwean politician and currently serves as the Minister of Home Affairs and Cultural Heritage. He also served as Zimbabwe's Minister of Sport, Arts and Recreation and Zimbabwe's Minister of Justice, Legal and Parliamentary Affairs. He was elected to the National Assembly in 2013 as a Zanu-PF member for Mazowe West Constituency. Previous to his move to politics, Kazembe was the chairman of the Dynamos football club.
