= Kembo Mohadi =

Zimbabwean politician

The Honourable Vice-President Col (Rtd) Kembo Muleya Mohadi
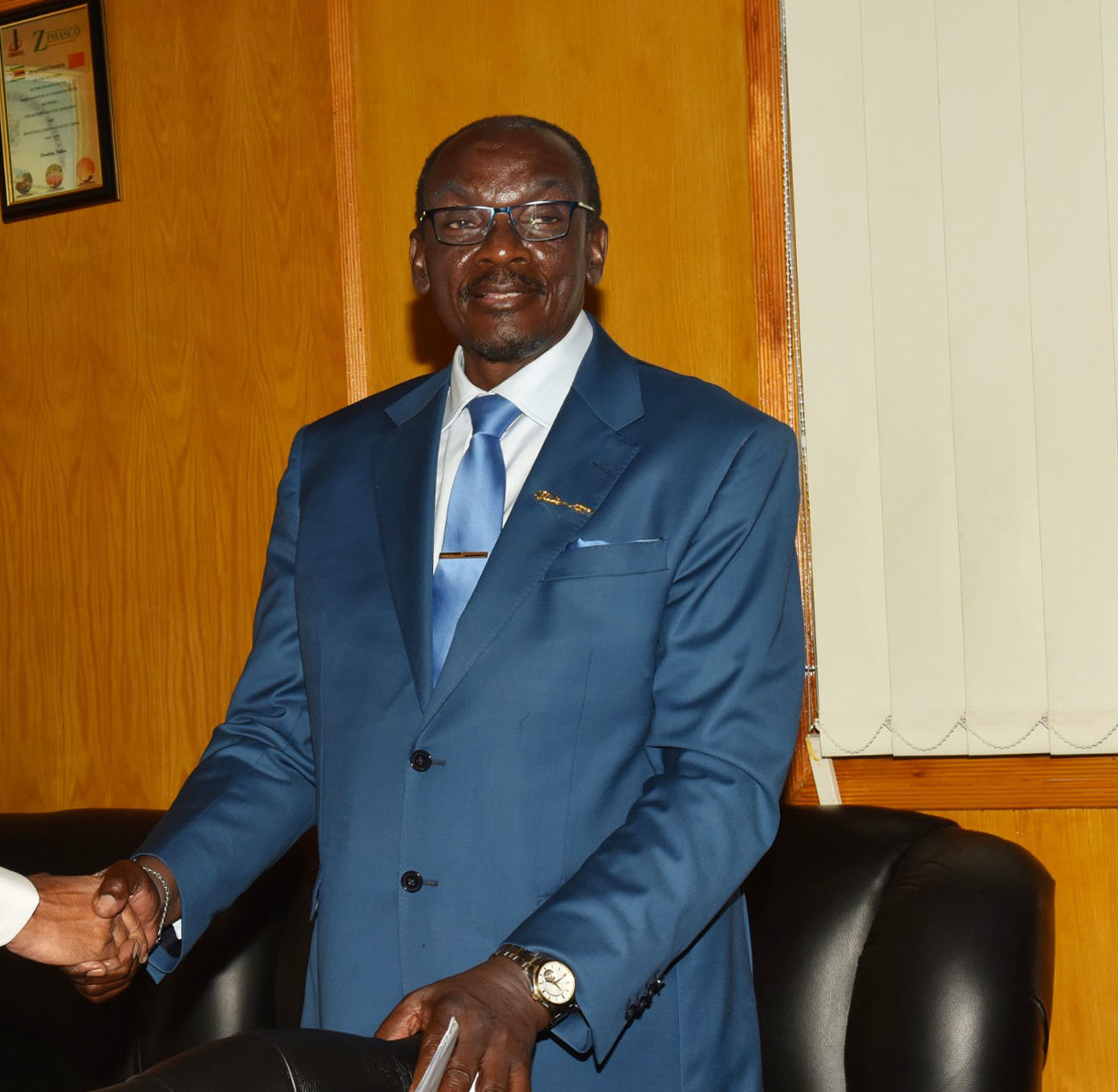

Second Vice-President of Zimbabwe
- Incumbent
- Assumed office 8 September 2023
- President: Emmerson Mnangagwa
- Preceded by: Himself
- In office 28 December 2017 – 1 March 2021 Serving with Constantino Chiwenga
- President: Emmerson Mnangagwa
- Preceded by: Phelekezela Mphoko
- Succeeded by: Himself

Second Secretary of ZANU–PF
- Incumbent
- Assumed office 29 October 2022
- President: Emmerson Mnangagwa

Minister of Defence, Security and War Veterans
- In office 30 November 2017 – 29 December 2017
- President: Emmerson Mnangagwa
- Deputy: Pupurayi Togarepi
- Preceded by: Sydney Sekeramayi
- Succeeded by: Constantino Chiwenga

6th Minister of State for National Security in the President's Office
- In office 6 July 2015 – 27 November 2017
- President: Robert Mugabe
- Preceded by: Sydney Sekeramayi
- Succeeded by: Position merged

Minister of Home Affairs
- In office August 2002 – 6 July 2015 Serving with Giles Mutsekwa (2009–2013)
- President: Robert Mugabe
- Prime Minister: Morgan Tsvangirai
- Succeeded by: Ignatius Chombo

Personal details
- Born: 15 November 1949 (age 76) Beitbridge, Southern Rhodesia (now Zimbabwe)
- Party: ZANU–PF
- Spouses: Tambudzani Muleya Budagi (m. 1981–2017) Catherine Muleya (m. 2018)
- Children: 6

Kembo Dugish Campbell Muleya Mohadi (born 15 November 1949) is a Zimbabwean politician and Second Vice-President of Zimbabwe since 8 September 2023. He previously served in the same role from 28 December 2017 to 1 March 2021, when he resigned. He briefly served as the Minister of Defence, Security and War Veterans in 2017. Previously he was Minister of State for National Security in the President's Office from 2015 to 2017 and Minister of Home Affairs from 2002 to 2015.

Mohadi was reappointed as second secretary of ZANU–PF at the party's elective congress on 29 October 2022 by President Emmerson Mnangagwa.

== Political career ==
Mohadi was born on 15 November 1949 in Beitbridge, Southern Rhodesia.

Having previously served as Deputy Minister of Local Government, he was appointed as Minister of Home Affairs in August 2002.

He was placed on the United States sanctions list in 2003.

Mohadi was nominated by ZANU–PF as its candidate for the House of Assembly seat from Beitbridge East constituency, in Matabeleland South, in the March 2008 parliamentary election. According to official results he won the seat by a large margin, receiving 4,741 votes against 2,194 for Muranwa Siphuma of the Movement for Democratic Change (MDC) faction led by Morgan Tsvangirai and 1,101 votes for Ncube Lovemore of the MDC faction led by Arthur Mutambara.

Following the swearing in of the Morgan Tsvangirai-led unity government in February 2009, Mohadi shared the Home Affairs ministry with Giles Mutsekwa of the MDC-T, as stipulated by the SADC arbitration in late 2008. After Mugabe won re-election in July 2013, Mohadi was re-appointed as sole Minister of Home Affairs on 10 September 2013.

President Mugabe moved Mohadi to the post of Minister of National Security on 6 July 2015. On 30 November 2017 he was appointed Minister of Defence, Security and War Veterans by Mugabe's successor, Emmerson Mnangagwa.

He was appointed as the vice-president of the ruling ZANU–PF party on 23 December 2017 and sworn in as Second Vice-President of Zimbabwe on 28 December 2017. Acting chief secretary to the President and Cabinet Justin Mupamhanga issued a statement on the following day that Mohadi had been appointed in charge of the National Peace and Reconciliation portfolio.

=== Assassination attempt ===
On 23 June 2018, an explosion at a campaign rally in Bulawayo hospitalized Mohadi, in what the Zimbabwe Broadcasting Corporation called an assassination attempt targeting President Mnangagwa.

=== Sex scandal and resignation ===
Following the leaking of alleged audio recordings, which circulated on social media, of Mohadi inviting married and single women to his office and hotels for sexual favours in February 2021, he tendered his resignation as Vice President on 1 March. Prior to this, he had released a statement denying the allegations, labelling the whole ordeal as a character assassination and that he was a "victim of political machinations" and "voice cloning".

Mohadi was reappointed as second secretary of ZANU–PF at the party's elective congress on 29 October 2022 by President Emmerson Mnangagwa, who called him a "naughty but honest person."
