= Minister of State in the Vice-President's Office (Zimbabwe) =

Ministry overview
- Dissolved: 22 August 2023
- Jurisdiction: Government of Zimbabwe

The Minister of State in the Vice-President's Office was a non-cabinet ministerial position in the government of Zimbabwe. The duties of the position were never publicly defined. No ministers were appointed to this role following the 2023 Zimbabwean general election. The last people to hold these posts were Sibangumuzi Sixtone Khumalo and Davis Marapira.
