= Cain Mathema =

Zimbabwean politician

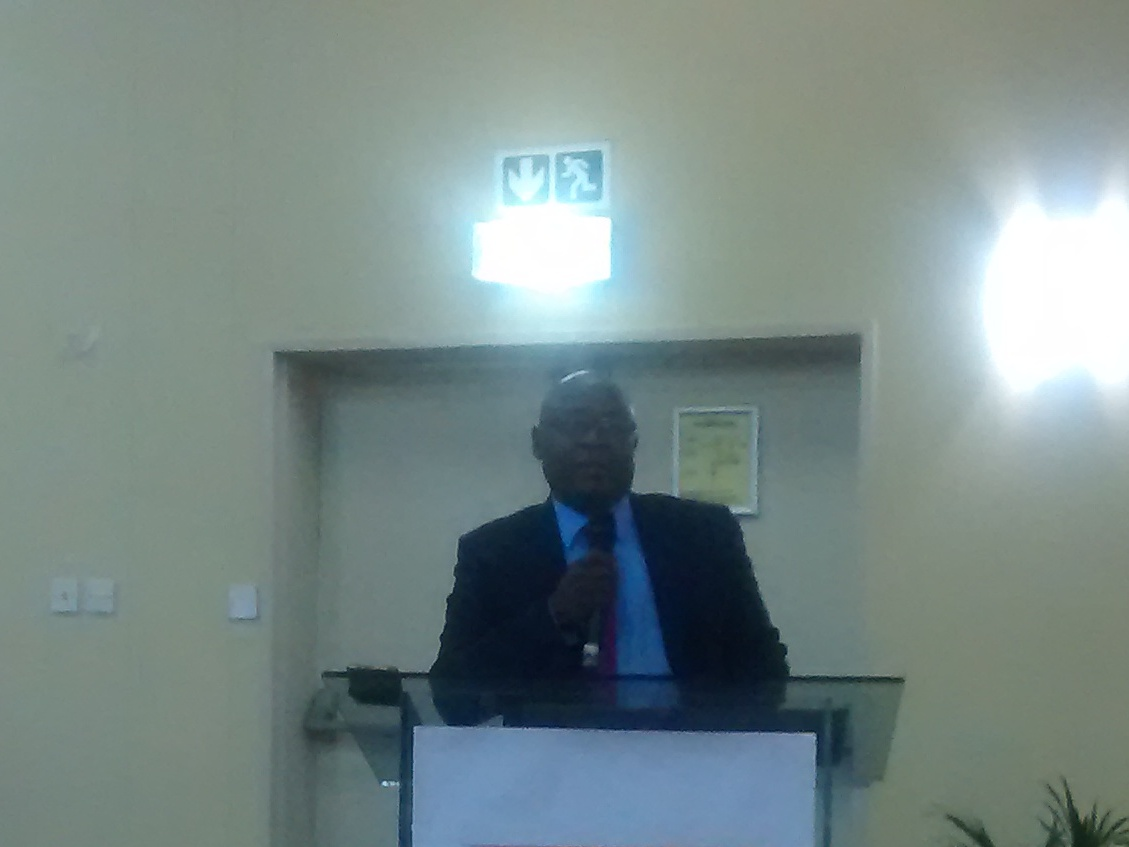
- Minister Cain Mathema, August 2015

Minister of Home Affairs and Cultural Heritage
- In office 7 September 2018 – 9 November 2019
- President: Emmerson Mnangagwa
- Preceded by: Obert Mpofu
- Succeeded by: Kazembe Kazembe

Minister of Primary and Secondary Education
- In office 9 November 2019 – 30 September 2021
- Preceded by: Paul Mavima
- Succeeded by: Evelyn Ndlovu

Personal details
- Born: 28 January 1948 (age 78) Southern Rhodesia Sipepa, Tsholotsho District
- Party: ZANU-PF
- Spouses: Musa Ncube (m. 1989; div. 2008); Bathabetsoe Nare (m. 2016)

Cain Ginyilitshe Ndabazekhaya Mathema (born 28 January 1948) is a Zimbabwean politician and writer. He has held various cabinet roles in the Zimbabwean government. He is a member of ZANU-PF. He was born in Sipepa, Tsholotsho District.

== Political career ==
Cain Mathema joined the Zimbabwe People's Revolutionary Army (ZIPRA) in 1968.

Soon after independence, Cain Mathema worked as a senior civil servant in the government of Zimbabwe. He later contested for political office and has since served as a governor and cabinet minister.

In Robert Mugabe's governments, Mathema served as:

- Deputy Minister of Rural Resources and Water Development - 1997
- Ambassador to Zambia
- Governor for Bulawayo - February 2004 - September 2013
- Minister of State for Provincial Affairs, Matebeleland North - September 2013 - October 2017
- Minister of War Veteran - October 2017 - November 2017

In Emmerson Mnangagwa's government, Mathema has served as:

- Minister of State for Matabeleland North - December 2017 - September 2018
- Minister of Home Affairs and Cultural Heritage - September 2018 - November 2019
- Minister of Primary and Secondary Education - November 2019 – 30 September 2021

Since 2005, he has been placed on the United States sanctions list. He is also sanctioned by other governments, such as Australia and the United Kingdom.

In late February 2008, he was present at rally supporting ZANU-PF candidate Sikhanyiso Ndlovu's bid for the Pelandaba-Mpopoma constituency seat.

On 6 November 2018, he promised to crush anti-government demonstrations which he alleges were being planned by Nelson Chamisa.

== Personal life ==
Cain Mathema is a published Ndebele and English poet, playwright, short-story writer and cartoonist. He has published 19 books on a variety of topics. His books are published by different publishing houses, which include, but are not limited to, Mambo Press, Longman Zimbabwe, Mathema Publishers, College Press and University of Zimbabwe Publications.

In December 2016, Cain, who was then Matebeleland North Provincial Governor, married 23-year-old Bathabetsoe Nare, who was 47 years his junior.
