= John Paradza =

Zimbabwean politician

The Hon. John Paradza MP

Deputy Minister of Environment, Climate and Wildlife
- Incumbent
- Assumed office 27 November 2023
- President: Emmerson Mnangagwa

Member of Parliament for Gutu West
- Incumbent
- Assumed office 26 August 2018
- President: Emmerson Mnangagwa
- Preceded by: Tongai Mathew Muzenda
- Constituency: Gutu West
- Majority: 10,372 (67.7%)

Personal details
- Born: 31 December 1991 (age 34)
- Party: ZANU-PF

John Paradza is a Zimbabwean politician. He is the current Deputy Minister of Environment, Climate and Wildlife of Zimbabwe and a member of parliament. He is the member of ZANU–PF.
