= Sibusiso Moyo (politician) =

Zimbabwean politician (1960–2021)

Lieutenant General (Rtd) Sibusiso Moyo
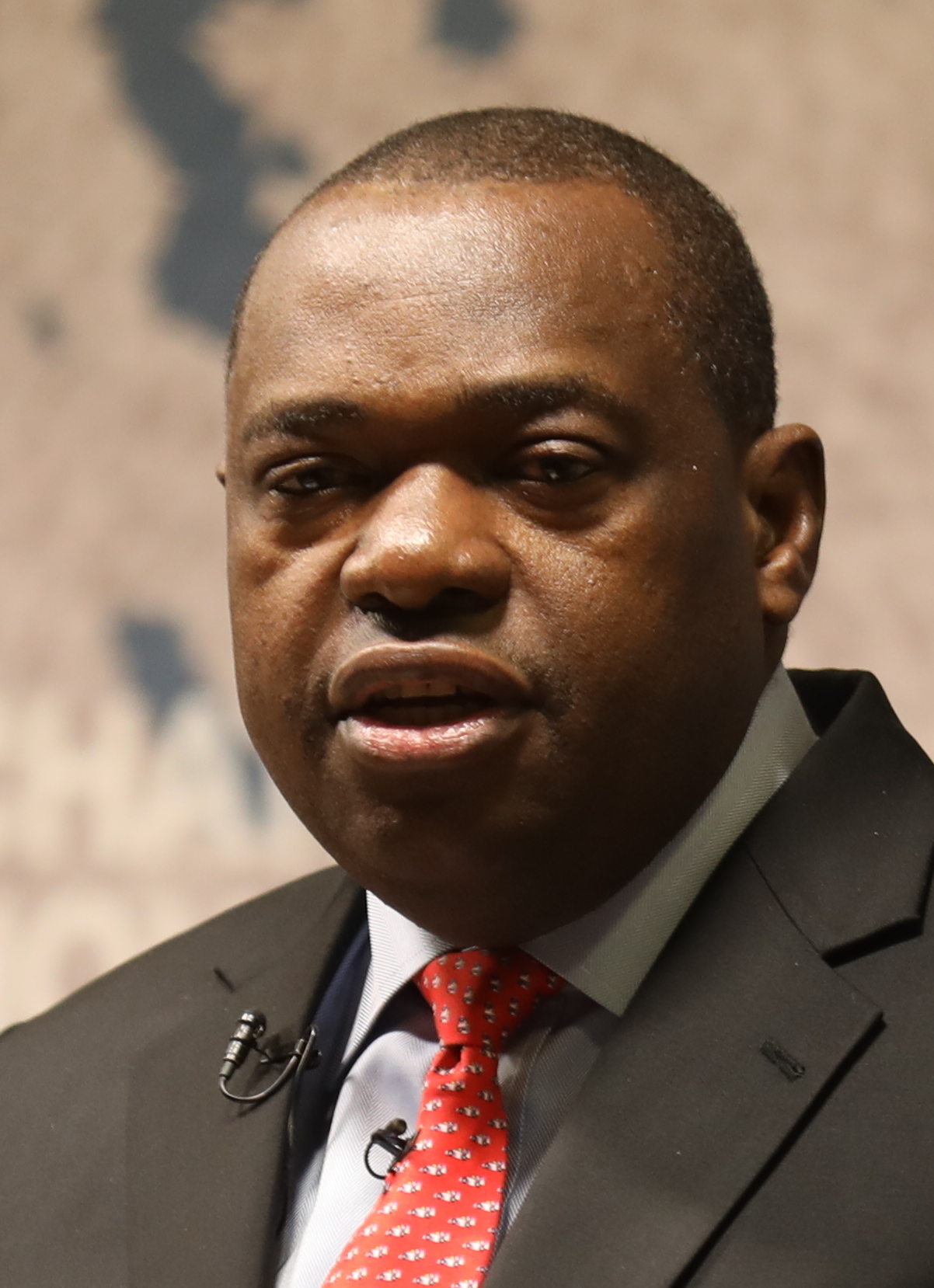
- Moyo in 2018

Minister of Foreign Affairs
- In office 30 November 2017 – 20 January 2021
- President: Emmerson Mnangagwa
- Preceded by: Walter Mzembi
- Succeeded by: Frederick Shava

Minister for International Trade
- In office 30 November 2017 – 20 January 2021
- President: Emmerson Mnangagwa
- Preceded by: Walter Mzembi
- Succeeded by: Frederick Shava

Personal details
- Born: 20 November 1961 Mberengwa, Southern Rhodesia, Rhodesia and Nyasaland
- Died: 20 January 2021 (aged 59) Harare, Zimbabwe
- Education: University of Zimbabwe; Zimbabwe Open University

Military service
- Allegiance: Zimbabwe
- Branch/service: Zimbabwe People's Revolutionary Army (1977–1980); Zimbabwe National Army (1980–2017)
- Years of service: 1977–2017
- Rank: Lieutenant General
- Battles/wars: Rhodesian Bush War

Sibusiso Busi Moyo (SB Moyo) (20 November 1961 – 20 January 2021) was a Zimbabwean politician and army Lieutenant general. He was noted for announcing the ousting of Robert Mugabe on national television during the 2017 Zimbabwean coup d'état. He went on to serve as Minister of Foreign Affairs and International Trade in the cabinet of Emmerson Mnangagwa from November 2017 until his death.

== Early life ==
Moyo was born at Mnene Mission Hospital in Mberengwa in 1960. He was the third of eight children. While studying at Manama Secondary School, he joined the liberation struggle in 1977. He earned a Masters in International Relations and a PhD in International Relations from the University of Zimbabwe, as well as a Masters in Business Administration from the Zimbabwe Open University.

== Career ==
SB Moyo served as a major general in the Zimbabwe National Army, before being promoted to lieutenant general on retirement in December 2017. He was promoted from brigadier general to major general by former President Robert Mugabe in January 2016.

Moyo gave a statement to state broadcaster Zimbabwe Broadcasting Corporation on 15 November 2017, one day after the house arrest of Mugabe. He denied that a coup had taken place, stating that "the president … and his family are safe and sound and their security is guaranteed", and that the military were "only targeting criminals around [Mugabe] who are committing crimes... that are causing social and economic suffering in the country". Moyo went on to confirm that "[a]s soon as we have accomplished our mission, we expect that the situation will return to normalcy." Three days later, Moyo gave a vote of thanks to all Zimbabweans that marched in solidarity to remove Mugabe outside State House. The announcement role he played in the army stepping in to remove Robert Mugabe as the president of Zimbabwe, coupled with his youthful appearance, earned him the sobriquet "General Bae".

Moyo was appointed as Minister of Foreign Affairs and International Trade on 30 November 2017 by Emmerson Mnangagwa, who replaced Mugabe as President of Zimbabwe. He was one of three members of Mnangagwa's cabinet who was not a member of parliament (the others being Perrance Shiri and Kirsty Coventry). Because of Moyo's public role in ending the Mugabe regime, there was speculation in the Zimbabwean press that Moyo was tapped by Mnangagwa as his successor. Moyo was in attendance at the 2018 Commonwealth Heads of Government Meeting in London.

== Personal life ==
Moyo was married to Loice Matanda, a judge who also served as ZACC chairperson. Together, they had two sons and 3 daughters.

Moyo died of COVID-19 on 20 January 2021, at a local hospital in Harare. He was aged either 60 or 61. He was buried in the National Heroes' Acre.
