= Abednico Ncube =

Zimbabwean politician

- Born: Abednico Ncube; 13 April 1954 (age 72)
- Occupation
- Employer: Government of Zimbabwe
- Political party: Zimbabwe African National Union Patriotic Front

Abednico Ncube is a Zimbabwean politician and a member of the ZANU-PF who is the current Minister of State for Provincial Affairs in Matabeleland South Province. Having taking part in the July 2018 elections, Ncube was elected Member of Parliament for Gwanda South. In 2020, he worked as a police inspector.

== Background ==
=== Early life ===
Ncube was born on 13 March 1954. With his late wife, who died in early 2011 due to a kidney failure at Mpilo Central Hospital aged at 56, he had seven children and five grandchildren. After his wife's death, she was declared a liberation war heroine and the funeral was attended by the late Vice President John Nkomo, Ministers Kembo Mohadi, Jacob Mudenda, Andrew Langa, the late Tshinga Dube, Sithembiso Nyoni, the late Ambassador Simon Khaya Moyo, Angeline Masuku and many senior government officials.

On 9 November 2016, as the Minister of Rural Developmen, Preservation and Promotion of National Culture and Heritage, Ncube installed Edwin Bhululu Sivalo Mahlangu as chief at a colourful ceremony.

=== Political work ===
Ncube joined politics in early 1970s as a member of PF ZAPU. After the Unity Accord in 1987, he became a ZANU PF member. In the 70s Ncube worked for the giant cement manufacture Pretoria Portland Holdings, PPC Zimbabwe in Colleen Bawn, Gwanda as a section manager.

In the early 80s, he joined the Gwanda Rural District Council where he served as District Education Officer before becoming Chief Executive Officer for the Gwanda Rural District Council.

In 1993, following the death of Johnson Ndlovu, Ncube was elected Member of Parliament for Gwanda through a bye-election. In 1995, during a harmonised election, Ncube won Gwanda South Constituency and also became ZANU PF Chief Whip in Parliament.

Following the 2000 harmonised election, Ncube beat Paulus Matjaka of the opposition Movement for Democratic Change, subsequently becoming Deputy Minister of Foreign Affairs, deputising Dr Stanslous Mudenge.

In 2005 Ncube thumped Honorable Paul Themba Nyathi of the Movement for Democratic Change, who was also the Spokesman for that party. After beating Nyathi, Robert Mugabe appointed Ncube as Deputy Minister of Public Service, Labour and Social Welfare, deputising Nicholas Goche.

In 2008, Ncube lost the ZANU PF primary election to the late Orders Mlilo. However, he was appointed to serve as Deputy Secretary of External Affairs in Robert Mugabe's Politburo.

In 2013, Ncube contested the Gwanda South seat once again and won against the Movement for Democratic Change Tsvangirai. He was then appointed Minister of State for Matabeleland South Provincial Affairs by Robert Mugabe.

In 2015 September while sitting as Member of Parliament for Gwanda South, Central Committee member, Politburo member, Minister of State for Matabeleland South Provincial Affairs, Robert Mugabe created a new Ministry known as the Ministry of Rural Development, Preservation and Promotion of National Culture and Heritage and appointed Ncube to head it on top of the parliamentary seat and the provincial ministry Robert Mugabe. After the October 2017 cabinet reshuffle, he lost his titles and was succeeded by Aaron Maboyi Ncube, the former Minister of State for Matabeleland South province. Following Mnangagwa take over in November 2017, Ncube retained his provincial ministry. In 2018, he contested the Gwanda South seat in a parliamentary election and won once again. Emmerson Mnangagwa went on to appoint him as the Provincial Minister of State for the Matabeleland South Province.

== Controversial and events ==
=== Beating up of journalists ===
Reports surfaced in early 2014 that Ncube had allegedly threatened to fight a Southern Eye journalist, Albert Ncube, for writing falsehoods about him. Ncube was also reported to have further threatened another Southern Eye journalist named Ndunduzo Tshuma when he sought comment on Ncube's alleged threats on Albert.

=== Fraudulent ===
In 2015, Ncube was allegedly reported to allocate Maleme Ranch to a central intelligence officer, Rodrick Mashingaidze without the consent of the lands committee and local traditional leaders. When Mashingaidze moved on the land, he began forcing villagers and the white owners out of the land. After long quarrels, Mashingaidze reported the matter to the High Court on the basis of the allocation letter signed by Ncube.

=== Sickness infection ===
In 2021, it was reported that Ncube with other government workers in the Matabeleland South Province had gone into isolation after testing positive for COVID-19. Ncube dismissed the claims.
