= Ministry of Environment, Climate and Wildlife (Zimbabwe) =

Government ministry of Zimbabwe

Agency overview
- Preceding agencies: Ministry of Environment and Tourism; Ministry of Environment, Water and Climate
- Jurisdiction: Government of Zimbabwe
- Headquarters: Kaguvi Building, 11th Floor, Corner Central Ave and Simon Muzenda St, Harare; 17.823631535709136°S 31.054155001238843°E
- Minister responsible: Evelyn Ndlovu, Minister of Environment, Water and Climate
- Deputy Minister responsible: John Paradza, Deputy Minister of Environment, Water and Climate
- Agency executive: Simon Masanga, Permanent Secretary
- Child agencies: Environmental Management Agency; Forestry Commission; Zimbabwe Parks and Wildlife Management Authority; Zimbabwe Tourism Authority

The Ministry of Environment, Climate and Wildlife is a government ministry, responsible for environmental management, climate change and wildlife management in Zimbabwe. The incumbent Minister is Evelyn Ndlovu. The Ministry oversees:

- Zimbabwe Parks and Wildlife Management Authority
- Environmental Management Agency in Zimbabwe
- Forestry Commission
- Meteorological Services Department of Zimbabwe
