= Sekai Nzenza =

Zimbabwean writer

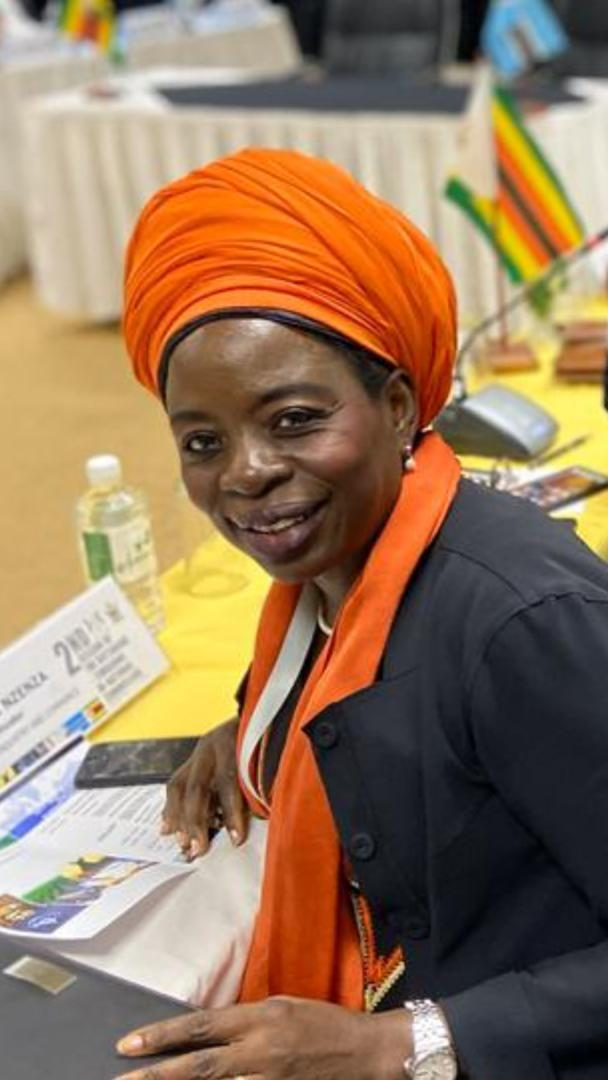
- Nzenza in 2024
- Born: Zimbabwe
- Education: University of Zimbabwe; University of Melbourne (Ph.D)
- Occupations: Diplomat, politician, corporate leader, writer, cultural critic
- Notable work: Zimbabwean Woman: My Own Story (1988)

Sekai Irene Nzenza Kanhutu is a Zimbabwean diplomat, development practitioner, corporate leader, writer, cultural critic and politician.

== Biography ==
She was born in rural Zimbabwe, where she trained as a nurse, before doing additional nursing studies in England and subsequently going to live in Australia.

Her semi-autobiographical first book, Zimbabwean Woman: My Own Story, was published in 1988. Her book Songs to an African Sunset (1997) describes her return to her family's village in the early 1990s. She has a Ph.D. in International Relations from the University of Melbourne.

Nzenza's extensive international development experience includes leadership roles with World Vision in Australia, Tanzania, Rwanda, and Sri Lanka, managing health, development, and relief programs. Her global impact expanded during her secondment to World Vision International headquarters in Los Angeles, where she contributed to a global strategy across 98 countries and led governance and change management.

Nzenza was Chief Executive Officer of Amatheon Agri Zimbabwe. In this executive role, she directed large-scale industrial and commercial farming, driving innovation in agricultural value chains and championing sustainable food production.

Nzenza wrote a weekly column for The Herald newspaper from 2011 to 2018, often returning to the theme of Zimbabweans reclaiming their cultural heritage and village roots. She entered politics as the Member for Chikomba East in Zimbabwe's 2018 harmonised elections. She was appointed as Zimbabwe's Minister of Public Service Labour and Social Welfare on 7 September 2018. As Minister of Industry and Commerce, she modernized Zimbabwe’s industrial base, fostering economic diversification, and attracted strategic investments across key sectors, advancing industrial growth and value chain integration.

In 2024, she was appointed Ambassador of Zimbabwe to France, Spain, Portugal and the Holy See and Permanent Representative to UNESCO and the World Tourism Organization.

== Bibliography ==
- Zimbabwean Woman: My Own Story, London: Karia Press, 1988. ISBN 978-0946918218.
- Songs to an African Sunset: A Zimbabwean Story, Lonely Planet Publications, 1997. ISBN 978-0864424723.
