= Joram Gumbo =

Zimbabwean politician

Joram Macdonald Gumbo is a Zimbabwean politician, member of parliament, former member of the Pan-African Parliament from Zimbabwe, and former cabinet minister. He is a member of the Zanu-PF party.

== Career ==
Shortly after independence Gumbo was elected as a member of the Zimbabwe House of Assembly for Mberengwa West in the Midlands province. He was reelected every election. In the 2013 elections, although he was opposed by his own younger brother, Tinashe Gumbo, a representative of the MDC-T party, he was reelected. He was again reelected in the 2018 elections.

In 1995 Gumbo became the "Chief Whip" of the ZANU-PF party, which office he held until resigning in 2015.

In 2010, Gumbo was appointed by President Mugabe as Zimbabwe's representative to the Pan-African Parliament.

In 2014, Gumbo was appointed ZANU-PF party secretary for education, a party politburo post, taking over from Sikhanyiso Ndlovu, at the ZANU PF 6th National People's Congress.

In 2015 Gumbo was appointed as Minister of Transport and Infrastructural Development, replacing Obert Mpofu.

In 2018 he was appointed as Minister of Energy and Power Development, but was reassigned by President in early 2019 to become a Minister of State in the President's Office in Charge of Policy Implementation.

== Charges and arrest ==
Following Gumbo's tenure as Minister of Transport and Infrastructural Development there were allegations of mishandling funds from Zinara (Zimbabwe National Road Authority) and Zimbabwe Airways.

In November 2019, the Zimbabwe Anti-Corruption Commission (ZACC) issued a warrant for Gumbo's arrest alleging irregularities in the purchase for Zimbabwe Airways of four Boeing 777-200 planes from Malaysian Airlines while he was Minister of Transport.

== See also ==
- List of members of the Pan-African Parliament
