= Ministry of Industry and Commerce (Zimbabwe) =

Government ministry of Zimbabwe

Ministry overview
- Jurisdiction: Government of Zimbabwe
- Headquarters: 13th Floor Mkwati Building, Corner 5th Street and Livingstone Avenue, Harare; 17.82223836731845°S 31.053760642951257°E
- Minister responsible: Mangaliso Ndlovu, Minister of Industry and Commerce
- Deputy Minister responsible: Raj Modi, Deputy Minister of Industry and Commerce
- Ministry executive: Tadeous Chifamba, Permanent Secretary
- Website: mic.gov.zw

The Ministry of Industry and Commerce is a government ministry, responsible for trade in Zimbabwe and industrial policy. The incumbent minister is Mangaliso Ndlovu and the deputy minister is Raj Modi. It oversees:

- National Incomes and Pricing Commission
