= Ministry of Home Affairs and Cultural Heritage (Zimbabwe) =

Government ministry of Zimbabwe

Agency overview
- Preceding agency: Ministry of Home Affairs
- Jurisdiction: Government of Zimbabwe
- Headquarters: 11th Floor Mukwati Building, Corner Livingstone Avenue and Simon Muzenda Street, Harare; 17.82219332164119°S 31.053657588632802°E
- Minister responsible: Kazembe Kazembe, Minister of Home Affairs and Cultural Heritage
- Deputy Minister responsible: Chido Sanyatwe, Deputy Minister of Home Affairs and Cultural Heritage
- Website: moha.gov.zw

The Ministry of Home Affairs and Cultural Heritage is the home affairs ministry of the government of Zimbabwe. It governs several matters, including the following:

- Board of Censors
- Immigration
- Lotteries and Gaming Board
- National Archives of Zimbabwe
- National Museums and Monuments of Zimbabwe
- Registrar General
- Zimbabwe Republic Police

It was a "sticking point" issue in the political negotiations between the three largest parties in the Parliament, which finally resolved to place two co-ministers from the two largest parliamentary parties over the ministry.
