= Third Cabinet of Emmerson Mnangagwa =

Government of Zimbabwe since 2023

- Cabinet of Zimbabwe
- 2023–present
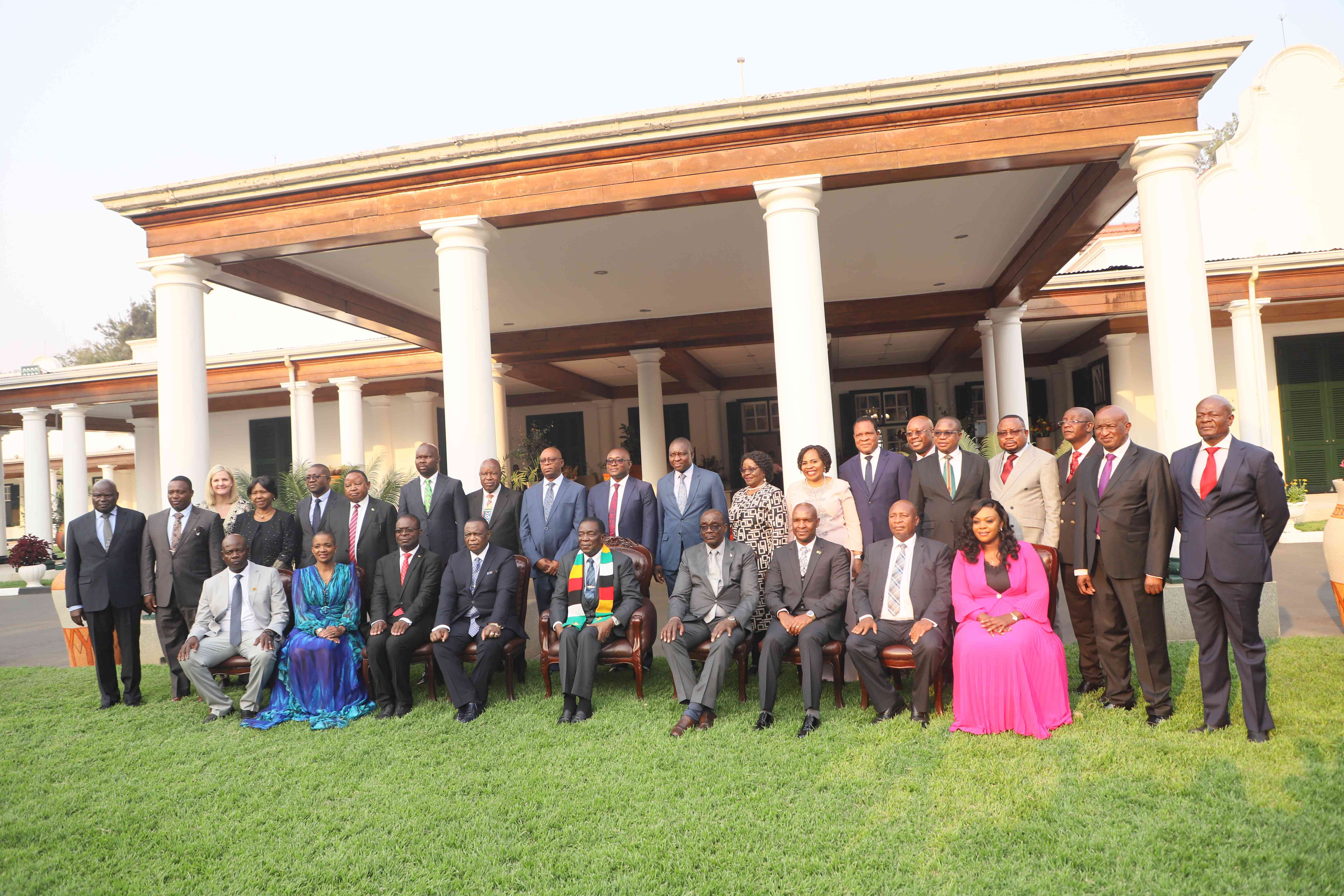
- 2023 Cabinet after swearing in
- Date formed: 11 September 2023 (3 years ago)

People and organisations
- President: Emmerson Mnangagwa
- First Vice-President: Constantino Chiwenga
- Second Vice-President: Kembo Mohadi
- Chief Secretary to the President and Cabinet: Misheck Sibanda (2003-2023); Martin Rushwaya (since 2023)
- No. of ministers: 27
- Member party: ZANU-PF
- Status in legislature: Majority
- Opposition party: CCC
- Opposition leader: Disputed

History
- Election: 23 August 2023
- Legislature terms: 10th Parliament
- Predecessor: Second Cabinet of Emmerson Mnangagwa

The third cabinet of Emmerson Mnangagwa is the current government of Zimbabwe. President Emmerson Mnangagwa announced its formation on 11 September 2023. The newly appointed ministers and their deputies were sworn in the following day.

== History ==
Zimbabwean president Emmerson Mnangagwa was sworn in for his second full term on 4 September 2023 following his disputed re-election in the 2023 Zimbabwean presidential election. On 8 September 2023, Mnangagwa reappointed Constantino Chiwenga as First Vice-President and announced the return of Kembo Mohadi as Second Vice-President. Mohadi had resigned from the role back in March 2021 due to a sex scandal.

Mnangagwa announced the formation of his third cabinet on 11 September 2023. The new cabinet consists of 26 ministries. The State Security ministry was initially scrapped, though was reinstated in November 2024. The Defence and War Veterans ministry was split into two new ministries and a new Ministry of Skills Audit and Development was created.

Controversially, Mnangagwa appointed his son, Kudakwashe, and his nephew, Tongai, to the positions of Deputy Minister of Finance and Investment Promotion and Deputy Minister of Tourism and Hospitality, respectively. Former State Security minister Owen Ncube, who was dismissed by Mnangagwa in January 2022, returned to cabinet as minister of Midlands Provincial Affairs.

All the newly appointed ministers and their deputies were sworn in the following day, with the exception of John Paradza and Nokuthula Matsikenyeri. The Constitution of Zimbabwe only permits the President to appoint seven non-Parliamentary members to Cabinet, however Mnangagwa had appointed nine. Matsikenyeri's appointment was rescinded on 12 September, and she was replaced by Misheck Mugadza, MP for Mutasa South. Paradza's appointment was not rescinded, but his swearing in was postponed until his victory in the Gutu West by election on 11 November 2023.

== Cabinets ==
=== 12 September 2023 – 10 April 2026 ===
First Cabinet of Third Mnangagwa Ministry
Portfolio	Portrait	Minister	Term
Cabinet ministers
President of Zimbabwe; Commander-in-Chief of the Zimbabwe Defence Forces		His Excellency President Dr. Emmerson Mnangagwa	2017 – present
First Vice-President of Zimbabwe		Hon. General (Rtd) Dr Constantino Chiwenga	2017 – present
Second Vice-President of Zimbabwe		Hon. Col (Rtd) Kembo Mohadi	2023 – present
Chief Secretary to the President and Cabinet		Dr Misheck Sibanda	2003 – 2023
Chief Secretary to the President and Cabinet		Dr Martin Rushwaya	2023 – present
Minister of State for Provincial Affairs in the Office of the President and Cabinet		Hon. Lovemore Matuke	2023 – 2024
Minister of State for National Security in the Office of the President and Cabinet		Hon. Lovemore Matuke	2024 – present
Minister of Defence		Hon. Oppah Muchinguri	2018 – present
Minister of Energy and Power Development		Hon. Edgar Moyo	2023 – 2025
Minister of Energy and Power Development		Hon. July Moyo	2025 – present
Minister of Environment, Climate and Wildlife		Hon. Mangaliso Ndlovu	2019 – 2024
Minister of Environment, Climate and Wildlife		Hon. Dr. Sithembiso Nyoni	2024 – 2025
Minister of Environment, Climate and Wildlife		Hon. Evelyn Ndlovu	2025 – present
Minister of Finance, Economic Development and Investment Promotion		Hon. Prof. Mthuli Ncube	2018 – 2026
Minister of Foreign Affairs and International Trade		Hon. Frederick Shava	2021 – 2024
Minister of Foreign Affairs and International Trade		Hon. Prof. Amon Murwira	2024 – present
Minister of Health and Child Care		Hon. Dr. Douglas Mombeshora	2023 – present
Minister of Higher and Tertiary Education, Innovation, Science and Technology Development		Hon. Prof. Amon Murwira	2017 – 2024
Minister of Higher and Tertiary Education, Innovation, Science and Technology Development		Hon. Frederick Shava	2024 – present
Minister of Home Affairs and Cultural Heritage		Hon. Kazembe Kazembe	2019 – present
Minister of Industry and Commerce		Hon. Dr. Sithembiso Nyoni	2023 – 2024
Minister of Industry and Commerce		Hon. Mangaliso Ndlovu	2024 – present
Minister of Information, Publicity and Broadcasting Services		Hon. Dr. Jenfan Muswere	2023 – 2026
Minister of Information, Publicity and Broadcasting Services		Hon. Soda Zhemu	2026 – present
Minister of Information Communication Technology, Postal and Courier Services		Hon. Tatenda Mavetera	2023 – present
Minister of Justice, Legal and Parliamentary Affairs		Hon. Ziyambi Ziyambi	2017 – present
Minister of Lands, Agriculture, Fisheries, Water and Rural Development		Hon. Dr. Anxious Masuka	2020 – 2026
Minister of Local Government and Public Works		Hon. Winston Chitando	2023 – 2024
Minister of Local Government and Public Works		Hon. Daniel Garwe	2024 – present
Minister of Mines and Mining Development		Hon. Soda Zhemu	2023 – 2024
Minister of Mines and Mining Development		Hon. Winston Chitando	2024 – 2025
Minister of Mines and Mining Development		Hon. Polite Kambamura	2025 – present
Minister of National Housing and Social Amenities		Hon. Daniel Garwe	2019 – 2024
Minister of National Housing and Social Amenities		Hon. Soda Zhemu	2024 – 2026
Minister of National Housing and Social Amenities		Hon. Prof. Paul Mavima	2026 – present
Minister of Primary and Secondary Education		Hon. Torerayi Moyo	2023 – present
Minister of Public Service, Labour and Social Welfare		Hon. July Moyo	2023 – 2025
Minister of Public Service, Labour and Social Welfare		Hon. Edgar Moyo	2025 – present
Minister of Skills Audit and Development		Hon. Prof. Paul Mavima	2023 – 2026
Minister of Skills Audit and Development		Hon. Dr. Jenfan Muswere	2026 – present
Minister of Sports, Recreation, Arts and Culture		Hon. Kirsty Coventry	2018 – 2025
Minister of Sports, Recreation, Arts and Culture		Hon. Lieutenant General (Rtd) Anselem Nhamo Sanyatwe	2025 – present
Minister of Tourism and Hospitality Industry		Hon. Barbara Rwodzi	2023 – present
Minister of Transport and Infrastructural Development		Hon. Felix Mhona	2021 – present
Minister of Veterans of the Liberation Struggle Affairs		Hon. Ambassador Christopher Mutsvangwa	2023 – 2024
Minister of Veterans of the Liberation Struggle Affairs		Hon. Monicah Mavhunga	2024 – present
Minister of Women Affairs, Community, Small and Medium Enterprises Development		Hon. Monica Mutsvangwa	2023 – present
Minister of Youth Empowerment, Development and Vocational Training		Hon. Tinoda Machakaire	2023 – present

=== 10 April 2026 – 8 October 2026 ===
Second Cabinet of Third Mnangagwa Ministry
Portfolio	Portrait	Minister	Term
Cabinet ministers
President of Zimbabwe; Commander-in-Chief of the Zimbabwe Defence Forces		His Excellency President Dr. Emmerson Mnangagwa	2017 – present
First Vice-President of Zimbabwe		Hon. General (Rtd) Dr Constantino Chiwenga	2017 – present
Second Vice-President of Zimbabwe		Hon. Col (Rtd) Kembo Mohadi	2023 – present
Chief Secretary to the President and Cabinet		Dr Martin Rushwaya	2023 – present
Minister of State for National Security in the Office of the President and Cabinet		Hon. Lovemore Matuke	2024 – present
Minister of Agriculture, Mechanisation and Water Resources Development		Hon. Dr. Anxious Masuka	2026 – present
Minister of Defence		Hon. Oppah Muchinguri	2018 – present
Minister of Energy and Power Development		Hon. July Moyo	2025 – present
Minister of Environment, Climate and Wildlife		Hon. Evelyn Ndlovu	2025 – present
Minister of Finance, Economic Development and Investment Promotion		Hon. Prof. Mthuli Ncube	2018 – 2026
Minister of Foreign Affairs and International Trade		Hon. Prof. Amon Murwira	2024 – present
Minister of Health and Child Care		Hon. Dr. Douglas Mombeshora	2023 – present
Minister of Higher and Tertiary Education, Innovation, Science and Technology Development		Hon. Frederick Shava	2024 – present
Minister of Home Affairs and Cultural Heritage		Hon. Kazembe Kazembe	2019 – present
Minister of Industry and Commerce		Hon. Mangaliso Ndlovu	2024 – present
Minister of Information, Publicity and Broadcasting Services		Hon. Soda Zhemu	2026 – present
Minister of Information Communication Technology, Postal and Courier Services		Hon. Tatenda Mavetera	2023 – present
Minister of Justice, Legal and Parliamentary Affairs		Hon. Ziyambi Ziyambi	2017 – present
Minister of Lands and Rural Development		Hon. Vangelis Haritatos	2026 – present
Minister of Local Government and Public Works		Hon. Daniel Garwe	2024 – present
Minister of Mines and Mining Development		Hon. Polite Kambamura	2025 – present
Minister of National Housing and Social Amenities		Hon. Prof. Paul Mavima	2026 – present
Minister of Primary and Secondary Education		Hon. Torerayi Moyo	2023 – present
Minister of Public Service, Labour and Social Welfare		Hon. Edgar Moyo	2025 – present
Minister of Skills Audit and Development		Hon. Dr. Jenfan Muswere	2026 – present
Minister of Sports, Recreation, Arts and Culture		Hon. Lieutenant General (Rtd) Anselem Nhamo Sanyatwe	2025 – present
Minister of Tourism and Hospitality Industry		Hon. Barbara Rwodzi	2023 – present
Minister of Transport and Infrastructural Development		Hon. Felix Mhona	2021 – present
Minister of Veterans of the Liberation Struggle Affairs		Hon. Monicah Mavhunga	2024 – present
Minister of Women Affairs, Community, Small and Medium Enterprises Development		Hon. Monica Mutsvangwa	2023 – present
Minister of Youth Empowerment, Development and Vocational Training		Hon. Tinoda Machakaire	2023 – present

=== 8 October 2026 – present ===
Third Cabinet of Third Mnangagwa Ministry
Portfolio	Portrait	Minister	Term
Cabinet ministers
President of Zimbabwe; Commander-in-Chief of the Zimbabwe Defence Forces		His Excellency President Dr. Emmerson Mnangagwa	2017 – present
First Vice-President of Zimbabwe		Hon. General (Rtd) Dr Constantino Chiwenga	2017 – present
Second Vice-President of Zimbabwe		Hon. Col (Rtd) Kembo Mohadi	2023 – present
Chief Secretary to the President and Cabinet		Dr Martin Rushwaya	2023 – present
Minister of State for National Security in the Office of the President and Cabinet		Hon. Lovemore Matuke	2024 – present
Minister of Agriculture, Mechanisation and Water Resources Development		Hon. Dr. Anxious Masuka	2026 – present
Minister of Defence		Hon. Oppah Muchinguri	2018 – present
Minister of Economic Development and Investment Promotion		Hon. Kudakwashe Tagwirei	2026 – present
Minister of Energy and Power Development		Hon. July Moyo	2025 – present
Minister of Environment, Climate and Wildlife		Hon. Evelyn Ndlovu	2025 – present
Minister of Finance		Hon. Prof. Mthuli Ncube	2026 – present
Minister of Foreign Affairs and International Trade		Hon. Prof. Amon Murwira	2024 – present
Minister of Health and Child Care		Hon. Dr. Douglas Mombeshora	2023 – present
Minister of Higher and Tertiary Education, Innovation, Science and Technology Development		Hon. Frederick Shava	2024 – present
Minister of Home Affairs and Cultural Heritage		Hon. Kazembe Kazembe	2019 – present
Minister of Industry and Commerce		Hon. Mangaliso Ndlovu	2024 – present
Minister of Information, Publicity and Broadcasting Services		Hon. Soda Zhemu	2026 – present
Minister of Information Communication Technology, Postal and Courier Services		Hon. Tatenda Mavetera	2023 – present
Minister of Justice, Legal and Parliamentary Affairs		Hon. Ziyambi Ziyambi	2017 – present
Minister of Lands and Rural Development		Hon. Vangelis Haritatos	2026 – present
Minister of Local Government and Public Works		Hon. Daniel Garwe	2024 – present
Minister of Mines and Mining Development		Hon. Polite Kambamura	2025 – present
Minister of National Housing and Social Amenities		Hon. Prof. Paul Mavima	2026 – present
Minister of Primary and Secondary Education		Hon. Torerayi Moyo	2023 – present
Minister of Public Service, Labour and Social Welfare		Hon. Edgar Moyo	2025 – present
Minister of Skills Audit and Development		Hon. Dr. Jenfan Muswere	2026 – present
Minister of Sports, Recreation, Arts and Culture		Hon. Lieutenant General (Rtd) Anselem Nhamo Sanyatwe	2025 – present
Minister of Tourism and Hospitality Industry		Hon. Barbara Rwodzi	2023 – present
Minister of Transport and Infrastructural Development		Hon. Felix Mhona	2021 – present
Minister of Veterans of the Liberation Struggle Affairs		Hon. Monicah Mavhunga	2024 – present
Minister of Women Affairs, Community, Small and Medium Enterprises Development		Hon. Monica Mutsvangwa	2023 – present
Minister of Youth Empowerment, Development and Vocational Training		Hon. Tinoda Machakaire	2023 – present

== List of ministers ==
Member of the House of Assembly	Member of the Senate	Non-Parliamentary Minister (Note: Constitutionally limited to seven in the Cabinet, not including the President, Vice-Presidents, and their secretaries.)
Cabinet ministers are listed **in bold** while deputies are not

=== The Office of the President and Cabinet (OPC) ===
The Office of the President and Cabinet
Post	Minister	Term
President of Zimbabwe; Commander-in-Chief of the Zimbabwe Defence Forces	His Excellency President Dr **Emmerson Mnangagwa**	24 November 2017 – present
First Vice-President of Zimbabwe	Hon. General (Rtd) Dr **Constantino Chiwenga**	28 December 2017 – present
Second Vice-President of Zimbabwe	Hon. Col (Rtd) **Kembo Mohadi**	8 September 2023 – present
Chief Secretary to the President and Cabinet	Dr Misheck Sibanda	5 May 2003 – 26 September 2023
Chief Secretary to the President and Cabinet	Dr Martin Rushwaya	26 September 2023 – present
Minister of State for Provincial Affairs in the Office of the President and Cabinet	Hon. Lovemore Matuke	12 September 2023 – 19 November 2024
Minister of State for National Security in the Office of the President and Cabinet	Hon. Lovemore Matuke	19 November 2024 – present
Special Advisor on Disability Issues in the Office of the President and Cabinet	Hon. Rossy Mpofu	19 November 2024 – present
Executive Director for the Presidential and National Scholarships Department in the Office of the President and Cabinet	Hon. Raymore Machingura	19 November 2024 – present

=== Departments of state ===
Agriculture, Mechanisation and Water Resources Development
Ministry split from Ministry of Lands, Agriculture, Fisheries, Water and Rural Development on 10 April 2026
Minister of Agriculture, Mechanisation and Water Resources Development	Hon. Dr. **Anxious Masuka**	10 April 2026 – present
Deputy Minister of Agriculture, Mechanisation and Water Resources Development	Hon. Davis Marapira	10 April 2026 – present

Defence
Minister of Defence	Hon. **Oppah Muchinguri**	10 September 2018 – present
Deputy Minister of Defence	Hon. Brig. Gen. (Rtd) Levi Mayihlome	12 September 2023 – present

Economic Development and Investment Promotion
Ministry split from the Ministry of Finance, Economic Development and Investment Promotion on 8 October 2026
Minister of Economic Development and Investment Promotion	Hon. **Kudakwashe Tagwirei**	8 October 2026 – present
Deputy Minister of Economic Development and Investment Promotion	Hon. Clemence Chiduwa	11 November 2026 – present

Energy and Power Development
Minister of Energy and Power Development	Hon. **Edgar Moyo**	12 September 2023 – 3 January 2025
Minister of Energy and Power Development	Hon. **July Moyo**	3 January 2025 – present
Deputy Minister of Energy and Power Development	Hon. Yeukai Simbanegavi	24 April 2024 – present

Environment, Climate and Wildlife
Minister of Environment, Climate and Wildlife	Hon. **Mangaliso Ndlovu**	8 November 2019 – 8 March 2024
Minister of Environment, Climate and Wildlife	Hon. Dr. **Sithembiso Nyoni**	8 March 2024 – 3 April 2025
Minister of Environment, Climate and Wildlife	Hon. **Evelyn Ndlovu**	11 April 2025 –
Deputy Minister of Environment, Climate and Wildlife	Hon. John Paradza (Note: Paradza's appointment was postponed until his election to the National Assembly in the Gutu West by-election.)	27 November 2023 – present

Finance
Ministry split from the Ministry of Finance, Economic Development and Investment Promotion on 8 October 2026
Minister of Finance	Hon. Prof. **Mthuli Ncube**	8 October 2026 – present
Deputy Minister of Finance	Hon. David Kudakwashe Mnangagwa	8 October 2026 – present

Finance, Economic Development and Investment Promotion
Minister of Finance & Investment Promotion	Hon. Prof. **Mthuli Ncube**	10 September 2018 – 8 October 2026
Deputy Minister of Finance & Investment Promotion	Hon. David Kudakwashe Mnangagwa	12 September 2023 – 8 October 2026
Ministry split into the Ministry of Finance and the Ministry of Economic Development and Investment Promotion on 8 October 2026

Foreign Affairs and International Trade
Minister of Foreign Affairs	Hon. **Frederick Shava**	2 March 2021 – 15 October 2024
Minister of Foreign Affairs	Hon. Prof. **Amon Murwira**	15 October 2024 – present
Deputy Minister of Foreign Affairs	Hon. Sheillah Chikomo	3 February 2024 – present

Health and Child Care
Minister of Health and Child Care	Hon. Dr. **Douglas Mombeshora**	12 September 2023 – present
Deputy Minister of Health and Child Care	Hon. Sleiman Timios Kwidini	24 January 2024 – present

Higher and Tertiary Education, Innovation, Science and Technology Development
Minister of Higher Education and Tertiary Education	Hon. Prof. **Amon Murwira**	4 December 2017 – 15 October 2024
Minister of Higher Education and Tertiary Education	Hon. **Frederick Shava**	15 October 2024 – present
Deputy Minister of Higher Education and Tertiary Education	Hon. Simelisizwe Sibanda	14 September 2023 – 1 July 2024; 31 July 2024 – present

Home Affairs and Cultural Heritage
Minister of Home Affairs and Cultural Heritage	Hon. **Kazembe Kazembe**	8 November 2019 – present
Deputy Minister of Home Affairs and Cultural Heritage	Hon. Chido Sanyatwe	18 September 2023 – present

Industry and Commerce
Minister of Industry and Commerce	Hon. Dr. **Sithembiso Nyoni**	12 September 2023 – 8 March 2024
Minister of Industry and Commerce	Hon. **Mangaliso Ndlovu**	8 March 2024 – present
Deputy Minister of Industry and Commerce	Hon. Roy Bhila	18 September 2023 – 30 November 2023
Deputy Minister of Industry and Commerce	Hon. Raj Modi	24 January 2024 – present

Information, Publicity and Broadcasting Services
Minister of Information	Hon. Dr. **Jenfan Muswere**	12 September 2023 – 11 February 2026
Minister of Information	Hon. **Soda Zhemu**	11 February 2026 – present
Deputy Minister of Information	Hon. Dr. Omphile Marupi	3 February 2024 – present

Information Communication Technology, Postal and Courier Services
Minister of Information Communication Technology	Hon. **Tatenda Mavetera**	12 September 2023 – present
Deputy Minister of Information Communication Technology	Hon. Dingumuzi Phuti	8 November 2019 – present

Justice, Legal and Parliamentary Affairs
Minister of Justice, Legal and Parliamentary Affairs	Hon. **Ziyambi Ziyambi**	4 December 2017 – present
Deputy Minister of Justice, Legal and Parliamentary Affairs	Hon. Nobert Mazungunye (Note: Spelled 'Obert' in the press release.)	12 September 2023 – present

Lands, Agriculture, Fisheries, Water and Rural Development
Minister of Lands, Agriculture, Fisheries and Rural Development	Hon. Dr. **Anxious Masuka**	14 August 2020 – 10 April 2026
Deputy Minister of Lands, Agriculture, Fisheries and Rural Development	Hon. Vangelis Peter Haritatos	10 September 2018 – 10 April 2026
Deputy Minister of Lands, Agriculture, Fisheries and Rural Development	Hon. Davis Marapira	20 April 2021 – 10 April 2026
Ministry split into the Ministry of Lands, Agriculture, Fisheries, Water and Rural Development and the Ministry of Lands and Rural Development on 10 April 2026

Lands and Rural Development
Ministry split from Ministry of Lands, Agriculture, Fisheries, Water and Rural Development on 10 April 2026
Minister of Lands and Rural Development	Hon. **Vangelis Peter Haritatos**	10 April 2026 – present
Deputy Minister of Lands and Rural Development	Hon. Tsitsi Zhou	1 May 2026 – present

Local Government and Public Works
Minister of Local Government and Public Works	Hon. **Winston Chitando**	12 September 2023 – 24 April 2024
Minister of Local Government and Public Works	Hon. **Daniel Garwe**	24 April 2024 – present
Deputy Minister of Local Government and Public Works	Hon. Benjamin Kabikira	3 February 2024 – present
Deputy Minister of Local Government and Public Works responsible for Local Authorities and Traditional Leadership	Hon. Albert Mavunga	13 February 2025 – present

Mines and Mining Development
Minister of Mines and Mining Development	Hon. **Soda Zhemu**	12 September 2023 – 24 April 2024
Minister of Mines and Mining Development	Hon. **Winston Chitando**	24 April 2024 – 8 December 2025
Minister of Mines and Mining Development	Hon. **Polite Kambamura**	8 December 2025 – present
Deputy Minister of Mines and Mining Development	Hon. Polite Kambamura	10 September 2018 – 8 December 2025
Deputy Minister of Mines and Mining Development	Hon. Fred Moyo	17 December 2025 – present
Deputy Minister of Mines and Mining Development responsible for Oil and Gas Research including other Strategic Minerals Exploration	The Hon. Dr. Eng. Caleb Makwiranzou	13 February 2025 – present

National Housing and Social Amenities
Minister of National Housing	Hon. **Daniel Garwe**	8 November 2019 – 24 April 2024
Minister of National Housing	Hon. **Soda Zhemu**	24 April 2024 – 11 February 2026
Minister of National Housing	Hon. Prof. **Paul Mavima**	11 February 2026 – present
Deputy Minister of National Housing	Hon. Yeukai Simbanegavi	8 November 2019 – 24 April 2024
Deputy Minister of National Housing	Hon. Musa Ncube	24 April 2024 – present

Primary and Secondary Education
Minister of Primary and Secondary Education	Hon. **Torerayi Moyo**	12 September 2023 – present
Deputy Minister of Primary and Secondary Education	Hon. Angeline Gata	12 September 2023 – present

Public Service, Labour and Social Welfare
Minister of Public Service, Labour and Social Welfare	Hon. **July Moyo**	12 September 2023 – 3 January 2025
Minister of Public Service, Labour and Social Welfare	Hon. **Edgar Moyo**	3 January 2025 – present
Deputy Minister of Public Service, Labour and Social Welfare	Hon. Mercy Dinha	12 September 2023 – present

Skills Audit and Development
Minister of Skills Audit and Development	Hon. Prof. **Paul Mavima**	12 September 2023 – 11 February 2026
Minister of Skills Audit and Development	Hon. Dr. **Jenfan Muswere**	11 February 2026 – present

Sports, Recreation, Arts and Culture
Minister of Sports, Recreation, Arts and Culture	Hon. **Kirsty Coventry**	10 September 2018 – 25 March 2025
Minister of Sports, Recreation, Arts and Culture	Hon. Lieutenant General (Rtd) **Anselem Nhamo Sanyatwe**	25 March 2025 – present
Deputy Minister of Sports, Recreation, Arts and Culture	Hon. Emily Jesaya	12 September 2023 – present

Tourism and Hospitality Industry
Minister of Tourism and Hospitality	Hon. **Barbara Rwodzi**	12 September 2023 – present
Deputy Minister of Tourism and Hospitality	Hon. Tongai Mnangagwa	12 September 2023 – present

Transport and Infrastructural Development
Minister of Transport and Infrastructure Development	Hon. **Felix Mhona**	8 February 2021 – present
Deputy Minister of Transport and Infrastructure Development	Hon. Joshua Sacco	14 September 2023 – present

Veterans of the Liberation Struggle Affairs
Minister of Veterans of Liberation Struggle Affairs	Hon. Ambassador **Christopher Mutsvangwa**	12 September 2023 – 3 February 2024
Minister of Veterans of Liberation Struggle Affairs	Hon. **Monicah Mavhunga**	4 March 2024 – Present
Deputy Minister of Veterans of Liberation Struggle Affairs	Hon. Monicah Mavhunga	12 September 2023 – 4 March 2024
Deputy Minister of Veterans of Liberation Struggle Affairs	Hon. Headman Moyo	24 April 2024 – present

Women Affairs, Community, Small and Medium Enterprises Development
Minister of Women’s Affairs, Community & SMEs	Hon. **Monica Mutsvangwa**	12 September 2023 – present
Deputy Minister of Women’s Affairs, Community & SMEs	Hon. Jennifer Mhlanga	8 November 2019 – present
Deputy Minister of Women’s Affairs, Community & SMEs	Hon. Kiven Mutimbanyoka	17 December 2025 – present

Youth Empowerment, Development and Vocational Training
Minister of Youth Empowerment	Hon. **Tinoda Machakaire**	12 September 2023 – present
Deputy Minister of Youth Empowerment	Hon. Kudakwashe Mupamhanga	14 September 2023 – present

=== Provincial Affairs Ministers ===
Provincial Affairs Ministers
Bulawayo	Hon. **Judith Ncube**	10 September 2018 – present
Harare	Hon. **Charles Tawengwa**	12 September 2023 – present
Manicaland	Hon. Nokuthula Matsikenyere (Note: Matsikenyere was appointed on 11 September 2023, however was never sworn in, as she was not a member of Parliament, and the Constitution of Zimbabwe only permits seven non-Parliamentary members of the cabinet. Her appointment was rescinded on 12 September, and she was replaced by Misheck Mugadza.)	
Manicaland	Hon. **Misheck Mugadza**	12 September 2023 – present
Mashonaland Central	Hon. **Christopher Magomo**	12 September 2023 – present
Mashonaland East	Hon. **Aplonia Munzverengwi**	10 September 2018 – 11 February 2025
Mashonaland East	Hon. **Itayi Ndudzo**	11 February 2025 – present
Mashonaland West	Hon. **Marian Chombo**	12 September 2023 – present
Masvingo	Hon. **Ezra Chadzamira**	10 September 2018 – present
Matabeleland North	Hon. **Richard Moyo**	10 September 2018 – present
Matabeleland South	Hon. **Evelyn Ndlovu**	12 September 2023 – 11 April 2025
Matabeleland South	Hon. **Albert Nguluvhe**	11 April 2025 – present
Midlands	Hon. **Owen Ncube**	12 September 2023 – present
