= Cabinet of Zimbabwe =

Executive body forming the government of Zimbabwe

Third Cabinet of Emmerson Mnangagwa
- Cabinet of Zimbabwe
- 2023–present
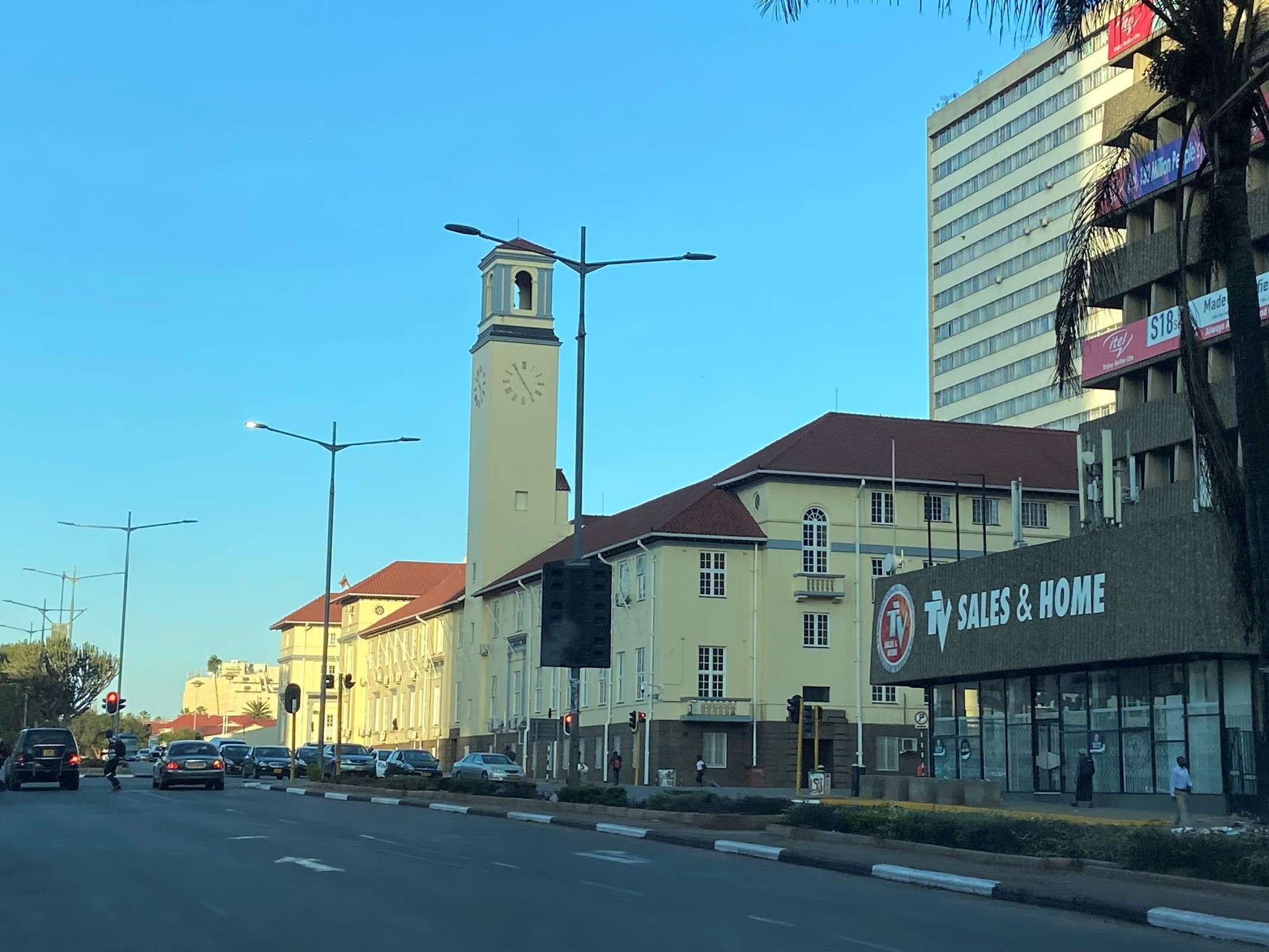
- The Munhumutapa Building in Harare is the location of the Office of the President and Cabinet
- Date formed: 11 September 2023 (3 years ago)

People and organisations
- President: Emmerson Mnangagwa
- First Vice-President: Constantino Chiwenga
- Second Vice-President: Kembo Mohadi
- Chief Secretary to the President and Cabinet: Martin Rushwaya
- No. of ministers: 27
- Member party: ZANU-PF
- Status in legislature: Majority
- Opposition party: CCC
- Opposition leader: Disputed

History
- Election: 23 August 2023
- Legislature terms: 10th Parliament
- Predecessor: Second Cabinet of Emmerson Mnangagwa

The Cabinet of Zimbabwe is the executive branch of the government of Zimbabwe, responsible for advising the president and implementing national policies. It consists of the president, who serves as its head, the two vice-presidents, and ministers appointed by the president. The Cabinet plays a central role in the administration of the country, overseeing various ministries and ensuring the execution of laws passed by Parliament. Established under the independence constitution in 1980, the Cabinet has undergone significant transformations, particularly with the shift to an executive presidency in 1987 and the adoption of a new constitution in 2013. It has also been shaped by political agreements, such as the Government of National Unity formed in 2009.

== History ==
The Cabinet of Zimbabwe traces its origins to the country's independence from British colonial rule in 1980. The original Constitution of Zimbabwe, promulgated on 18 April 1980 as a result of the Lancaster House Agreement of 1979, established a parliamentary system with a ceremonial president and an executive prime minister who chaired the Cabinet. Under this framework, the Prime Minister was the head of government, responsible for appointing and dismissing Ministers, while the Cabinet collectively advised on policy matters.

In 1987, significant constitutional amendments altered this structure. The Constitution of Zimbabwe Amendment (No. 7) Act, 1987, abolished the office of Prime Minister and introduced an executive presidency, consolidating power in the hands of the president. This change shifted the Cabinet's dynamics, making the president the direct head of the Cabinet and granting them sole authority over ministerial appointments and dismissals. The amendment aimed to streamline governance but was criticised for centralising power and reducing checks on the executive.

The Cabinet's composition was further influenced by political crises. Following the disputed 2008 presidential and parliamentary elections, which led to violence and economic instability, the Global Political Agreement (GPA) was signed on 15 September 2008 under the mediation of the Southern African Development Community (SADC). This paved the way for the Government of National Unity (GNU), inaugurated on 13 February 2009. The GNU Cabinet included representatives from the three major political parties: ZANU-PF (led by President Robert Mugabe), MDC-T (led by Prime Minister Morgan Tsvangirai), and MDC-M (led by Deputy Prime Minister Arthur Mutambara). It comprised 33 ministers initially, later reduced to 26, and focused on economic recovery, constitutional reform, and preparing for fresh elections. The GNU lasted until 2013, during which it oversaw the drafting of a new constitution.

The 2013 Constitution of Zimbabwe, approved in a referendum on 16 March 2013 and enacted on 22 May 2013, replaced the 1980 constitution and further refined the Cabinet's role. It maintained the executive presidency but introduced provisions for greater accountability, such as requiring the president to consider regional and gender balance in appointments. The new constitution also limited the president's terms to two five-year periods and outlined procedures for succession and removal.

Subsequent developments included Cabinet reshuffles under President Emmerson Mnangagwa, who assumed office following a military intervention in November 2017. His first Cabinet, announced on 30 November 2017, incorporated military figures and retained some ministers from the Mugabe era. After the 2018 elections, a leaner 20-member Cabinet was formed, expanded in later reshuffles. The third Mnangagwa Cabinet, sworn in on 11 September 2023 following the August 2023 elections, consists of 26 ministers and reflects continuity with previous administrations. In early 2025, amid reports of a potential reshuffle, the president opened the Cabinet year with a focus on economic empowerment and digital transformation.

== Role and functions ==
The Cabinet's primary role is to exercise executive authority on behalf of the president, as vested by the 2013 Constitution. Section 88 vests executive authority in the president, exercised through the Cabinet, which includes formulating and implementing national policies, preparing legislation for Parliament, and overseeing government operations. Under the 1980 Constitution, the Cabinet advised the Prime Minister, but the 1987 amendments transferred this advisory function directly to the president.

Cabinet meetings are presided over by the president or, in their absence, a vice-president or designated Minister. The Cabinet directs the operations of ministries, advises on international relations, and ensures compliance with the Constitution. It also plays a key role in budgeting, with the Minister of Finance presenting the national budget to Parliament. During the GNU period (2009–2013), the Cabinet's functions were shared among coalition partners, leading to joint decision-making on key issues like economic reforms.

The 2013 Constitution emphasises accountability, requiring Ministers to attend Parliament to answer questions and report on their portfolios (Section 107). The Cabinet must promote national unity, peace, and the rule of law, while respecting human rights and diversity.

== Appointment and dismissal of ministers ==
Under the 2013 Constitution (Section 104), the president appoints Ministers and assigns their functions, including the administration of Acts of Parliament or ministries. Appointments are guided by principles of regional balance, gender equality, and merit, though the president has discretion to appoint up to five non-parliamentary members for their expertise. Ministers must take an oath of office before the president. Deputy Ministers are similarly appointed to assist Ministers.

In the 1980 Constitution, the Prime Minister appointed Ministers, but the 1987 amendments shifted this power to the president, enhancing executive control. Dismissal is at the president's pleasure (Section 108 of the 2013 Constitution), though a vote of no confidence in the government by a two-thirds majority in a joint sitting of Parliament can force the president to dismiss all Ministers or dissolve Parliament. Ministers vacate office upon resignation, removal, or ceasing to be Members of Parliament (if applicable).

During the GNU, appointments were negotiated among the parties, with ZANU-PF holding the majority of portfolios, illustrating how political agreements can influence the process.

== Current Cabinet ==
The current cabinet is led by President Emmerson Mnangagwa. This is Mnangagwas's third cabinet and was formed following the 2023 General Election.

As of October 2026, the makeup of the current Cabinet is as follows:

Portfolio	Portrait	Minister	Term
Cabinet ministers
President of Zimbabwe; Commander-in-Chief of the Zimbabwe Defence Forces		His Excellency President Dr. Emmerson Mnangagwa	2017 – present
First Vice-President of Zimbabwe		Hon. General (Rtd) Dr Constantino Chiwenga	2017 – present
Second Vice-President of Zimbabwe		Hon. Col (Rtd) Kembo Mohadi	2023 – present
Chief Secretary to the President and Cabinet		Dr Martin Rushwaya	2023 – present
Minister of State for National Security in the Office of the President and Cabinet		Hon. Lovemore Matuke	2024 – present
Minister of Agriculture, Mechanisation and Water Resources Development		Hon. Dr. Anxious Masuka	2026 – present
Minister of Defence		Hon. Oppah Muchinguri	2018 – present
Minister of Economic Development and Investment Promotion		Hon. Kudakwashe Tagwirei	2026 – present
Minister of Energy and Power Development		Hon. July Moyo	2025 – present
Minister of Environment, Climate and Wildlife		Hon. Evelyn Ndlovu	2025 – present
Minister of Finance		Hon. Prof. Mthuli Ncube	2026 – present
Minister of Foreign Affairs and International Trade		Hon. Prof. Amon Murwira	2024 – present
Minister of Health and Child Care		Hon. Dr. Douglas Mombeshora	2023 – present
Minister of Higher and Tertiary Education, Innovation, Science and Technology Development		Hon. Frederick Shava	2024 – present
Minister of Home Affairs and Cultural Heritage		Hon. Kazembe Kazembe	2019 – present
Minister of Industry and Commerce		Hon. Mangaliso Ndlovu	2024 – present
Minister of Information, Publicity and Broadcasting Services		Hon. Soda Zhemu	2026 – present
Minister of Information Communication Technology, Postal and Courier Services		Hon. Tatenda Mavetera	2023 – present
Minister of Justice, Legal and Parliamentary Affairs		Hon. Ziyambi Ziyambi	2017 – present
Minister of Lands and Rural Development		Hon. Vangelis Haritatos	2026 – present
Minister of Local Government and Public Works		Hon. Daniel Garwe	2024 – present
Minister of Mines and Mining Development		Hon. Polite Kambamura	2025 – present
Minister of National Housing and Social Amenities		Hon. Prof. Paul Mavima	2026 – present
Minister of Primary and Secondary Education		Hon. Torerayi Moyo	2023 – present
Minister of Public Service, Labour and Social Welfare		Hon. Edgar Moyo	2025 – present
Minister of Skills Audit and Development		Hon. Dr. Jenfan Muswere	2026 – present
Minister of Sports, Recreation, Arts and Culture		Hon. Lieutenant General (Rtd) Anselem Nhamo Sanyatwe	2025 – present
Minister of Tourism and Hospitality Industry		Hon. Barbara Rwodzi	2023 – present
Minister of Transport and Infrastructural Development		Hon. Felix Mhona	2021 – present
Minister of Veterans of the Liberation Struggle Affairs		Hon. Monicah Mavhunga	2024 – present
Minister of Women Affairs, Community, Small and Medium Enterprises Development		Hon. Monica Mutsvangwa	2023 – present
Minister of Youth Empowerment, Development and Vocational Training		Hon. Tinoda Machakaire	2023 – present

== See also ==
- President of Zimbabwe
- Parliament of Zimbabwe
- Politics of Zimbabwe
