= Minister of State for Provincial Affairs =

Decentralized administrative structure overview
- Formed: 2 March 1984
- Jurisdiction: Ten provinces of Zimbabwe
- Headquarters: Various provincial capitals
- Employees: Varies by province
- Annual budget: Central government allocations
- Decentralized administrative structure executives: Various, Ministers of State for Provincial Affairs; Various, Provincial Council Chairpersons

This is a list of current governors of the provinces of Zimbabwe. The governors of each province, officially titled Ministers of State, are appointed by the President.

== Current Ministers for Provincial Affairs ==
Parliamentary position: Elected Member of the House of Assembly Elected Member of the Senate Non-Elected Minister (Note: Constitutionally limited to seven in the Cabinet, not including the President, Vice-Presidents, and their secretaries.)

Province	Name of Minister	Date Appointed
Bulawayo	Hon. Judith Ncube	10 September 2018
Harare	Hon. Charles Tawengwa	12 September 2023
Manicaland	Hon. Misheck Mugadza	12 September 2023
Mashonaland Central	Hon. Christopher Magomo	12 September 2023
Mashonaland East	Hon. Itayi Ndudzo	11 February 2025
Mashonaland West	Hon. Marian Chombo	12 September 2023
Masvingo	Hon. Ezra Chadzamira	10 September 2018
Matabeleland North	Hon. Richard Moyo	10 September 2018
Matabeleland South	Hon. Albert Nguluvhe	11 April 2025
Midlands	Hon. Owen Ncube	12 September 2023

== See also ==
- Politics of Zimbabwe
