= Minister of State for Provincial Affairs and Devolution for Mashonaland Central =

- Incumbent; Christopher Magomo since 12 September 2023
- Minister of State for Provincial Affairs
- Style: The Honourable
- Member of: Cabinet of Zimbabwe; Parliament of Zimbabwe
- Reports to: The President
- Seat: Mutungagore Government Complex, 567 Thurlows Avenue, Bindura
- Appointer: The President
- Term length: Five years, renewable for a second or subsequent term of office
- Constituting instrument: Provincial Councils and Administration Act (Chapter 29:11)
- Precursor: Provincial Governor of Mashonaland Central
- Formation: 22 August 2013
- Deputy: Permanent Secretary for Provincial Affairs and Devolution

The Minister of State for Provincial Affairs and Devolution for Mashonaland Central is the Provincial Minister of State for Mashonaland Central in Zimbabwe. The minister oversees provincial affairs and sits in the Parliament of Zimbabwe. The minister is appointed by the President of Zimbabwe and is appointed for a term of five years, which can be renewed for a second or subsequent term. Historically, the minister held the title Governor of Mashonaland Central, but the office has since been renamed to align with the 2013 Constitution of Zimbabwe, which does not allow for Provincial Governors.

== List of Ministers ==
Parliamentary position: Elected Member of the House of Assembly Elected Member of the Senate Non-Elected Minister

| No. | Name Birth–Death | Term in office | Party | Appointed by |
Provincial Governors
| | Joseph Kaparadza (Note: Kaparadza was elected MP to the House of Assembly in 1980. He was a Senator following the 1985 elections. The Senate was abolished in 1987.) | 2 March 1984 – 1 April 1990 | ZANU-PF | Robert Mugabe |
| | Moses Gorejena | 1 April 1990 – 1 January 1993 | ZANU-PF | Robert Mugabe |
| | Joice Mujuru b. 15 April 1955 | 1 January 1993 – 9 May 1996 | ZANU-PF | Robert Mugabe |
| | Border Gezi; 17 December 1964 – 28 April 2001 | 9 May 1996 – 15 July 2000 | ZANU-PF | Robert Mugabe |
| | Elliot Manyika; 30 July 1955 – 6 December 2008 | 15 July 2000 – 1 December 2003 | ZANU-PF | Robert Mugabe |
| | Ephraim Masawi; 8 June 1949 - 25 September 2010 | 1 December 2003 – 30 April 2008 | ZANU-PF | Robert Mugabe |
| | Martin Dinha | 25 August 2008 – 28 June 2013 | ZANU-PF | Robert Mugabe |
Ministers of State for Provincial Affairs
| | Martin Dinha (Note: Dinha was a non-parliamentary minister until 24 July 2016, when he was elected to the House of Assembly in the Mazowe North by-election.) | 11 September 2013 – 29 July 2018 | ZANU-PF | Robert Mugabe; Emmerson Mnangagwa |
| | Monicah Mavhunga b. 23 November 1961 | 10 September 2018 – 22 August 2023 | ZANU-PF | Emmerson Mnangagwa |
| | Christopher Magomo b. 15 July 1975 | 12 September 2023 – present | ZANU-PF | Emmerson Mnangagwa |

== See also ==
- List of current provincial governors of Zimbabwe
