= Minister of State for Provincial Affairs and Devolution for Midlands =

Ministerial post in Zimbabwe

- Incumbent; Owen Ncube since 12 September 2023
- Minister of State for Provincial Affairs
- Style: The Honourable
- Member of: Cabinet of Zimbabwe; Parliament of Zimbabwe
- Reports to: The President
- Seat: Gweru
- Appointer: The President
- Term length: Five years, renewable for a second or subsequent term of office
- Constituting instrument: Provincial Councils and Administration Act (Chapter 29:11)
- Precursor: Provincial Governor of Midlands
- Formation: 22 August 2013
- Deputy: Permanent Secretary for Provincial Affairs and Devolution

The Minister of State for Provincial Affairs and Devolution for Midlands is the Provincial Minister of State for Midlands in Zimbabwe. The minister oversees provincial affairs and sits in the Parliament of Zimbabwe. The minister is appointed by the President of Zimbabwe and is appointed for a term of five years, which can be renewed for a second or subsequent term. Historically, the minister held the title Governor of Midlands, but the office has since been renamed to align with the 2013 Constitution of Zimbabwe, which does not allow for Provincial Governors.

== List of Ministers ==
Parliamentary position: Elected Member of the House of Assembly Elected Member of the Senate Non-Elected Minister

No.	Name Birth–Death	Term in office	Party	Appointed by
Provincial Governors
	Benson Ndemera (Note: Ndemera not an MP after the 1980 elections. He was a Senator following the 1985 elections.) d. 1 February 1986	2 March 1984 – 1 February 1986	ZANU-PF	Robert Mugabe
	Tranos Makombe (Note: Makombe was elected a Senator on 3 April 1986, a month after being appointed Governor.) d. 4 November 2004	1 March 1986 – 1 April 1990	ZANU-PF	Robert Mugabe
	Cephas Msipa; 7 July 1931–17 October 2016	1 April 1990 – 9 April 1990	ZANU-PF	Robert Mugabe
	Herbert Mahlaba; 11 July 1946–30 December 1998	9 April 1990 – 30 December 1998	ZANU-PF	Robert Mugabe
	July Moyo b. 7 May 1950	1 April 1999 – 15 July 2000	ZANU-PF	Robert Mugabe
	Cephas Msipa; 7 July 1931–17 October 2016	15 July 2000 – 30 April 2008	ZANU-PF	Robert Mugabe
	Jason Machaya b. 13 June 1952	25 August 2008 – 28 June 2013	ZANU-PF	Robert Mugabe
Ministers of State for Provincial Affairs
	Jason Machaya b. 13 June 1952	11 September 2013 – 21 November 2017	ZANU-PF	Robert Mugabe
	Owen Ncube b. 17 April 1968	4 December 2017 – 29 July 2018	ZANU-PF	Emmerson Mnangagwa
	Larry Mavima	10 September 2018 – 22 August 2023	ZANU-PF	Emmerson Mnangagwa
	Owen Ncube b. 17 April 1968	12 September 2023 – present	ZANU-PF	Emmerson Mnangagwa

== See also ==
- List of current provincial governors of Zimbabwe
