= Mutsvangwa =

Mutsvangwa is a Zimbabwean surname. Notable people with the surname include:

- Christopher Mutsvangwa, Zimbabwean politician
- Monica Mutsvangwa, Zimbabwean politician
