= Winston Chitando =

Zimbabwean politician

The Honourable Winston Chitando MP

Minister of Mines and Mining Development
- In office 24 April 2024 – 8 December 2025
- President: Emmerson Mnangagwa
- Deputy: Polite Kambamura
- Preceded by: Soda Zhemu
- Succeeded by: Polite Kambamura
- In office 4 December 2017 – 22 August 2023
- President: Emmerson Mnangagwa
- Deputy: Polite Kambamura
- Preceded by: Walter Chidhakwa
- Succeeded by: Soda Zhemu

Member of Parliament for Gutu Central
- Incumbent
- Assumed office 26 August 2018
- President: Emmerson Mnangagwa
- Preceded by: Lovemore Matuke
- Constituency: Gutu Central
- Majority: 7,244 (36.0%)

Minister of Local Government and Public Works
- In office 12 September 2023 – 24 April 2024
- President: Emmerson Mnangagwa
- Deputy: Benjamin Kabikira
- Preceded by: July Moyo
- Succeeded by: Daniel Garwe

Personal details
- Party: ZANU-PF

Winston Chitando is a Zimbabwean politician.

== Education ==
He completed a Bachelor of Accountancy degree from the University of Zimbabwe in November 1984. In 1984, he joined Anglo American Corporation as a graduate trainee and worked for the group for a total of 11 years, rising through the group's ranks to hold various positions and directorships in a number of industrial and mining companies which were part of the Anglo American group.

== Career ==
In December 2017 was appointed the country's Minister of Mines and Mining Development. He is a member of Zanu-PF and is the member of parliament for Gutu Central. He was ordered imprisoned in February 2020 for contempt of court for failing to transfer ownership over mining claims.

Prior to becoming a politician, he led mine operations at Mimosa Holdings and Hwange Colliery Company Limited.

Winston Chitando is the son of Nyengeterai Chitando and David Kwangware Gwatima Chitando.
