= Omphile =

Omphile is a Sotho-Tswana name meaning "God has given me" or "He has given". It is the most prevalent in South Africa and has the highest frequency in Botswana.

== Notable people with the name include ==
- Omphile Maotwe, South African politician
- Omphile Marupi, Zimbabwean politician
- Omphile Ramela (born 1988), South African cricketer
