= Minister of State for Provincial Affairs and Devolution for Bulawayo =

- Incumbent; Judith Ncube since 10 September 2018
- Minister of State for Provincial Affairs
- Style: The Honourable
- Member of: Cabinet of Zimbabwe; Parliament of Zimbabwe
- Reports to: The President
- Seat: Mhlahlandlela Government Complex, Bulawayo
- Appointer: The President
- Term length: Five years, renewable for a second or subsequent term of office
- Constituting instrument: Provincial Councils and Administration Act (Chapter 29:11)
- Precursor: Provincial Governor of Bulawayo
- Formation: 22 August 2013
- Deputy: Permanent Secretary for Provincial Affairs and Devolution
- Website: opcbyometro.gov.zw

The Minister of State for Provincial Affairs and Devolution for Bulawayo is the Provincial Minister of State for Bulawayo in Zimbabwe. The minister oversees provincial affairs and sits in the Parliament of Zimbabwe. The minister is appointed by the President of Zimbabwe and is appointed for a term of five years, which can be renewed for a second or subsequent term. Historically, the minister held the title Governor of Bulawayo, but the office has since been renamed to align with the 2013 Constitution of Zimbabwe, which does not allow for Provincial Governors.

== List of Ministers of State ==
Parliamentary position: Elected Member of the House of Assembly Elected Member of the Senate Non-Elected Minister

No.	Name Birth–Death	Term in office	Party	Appointed by
Provincial Governors
1	Cain Mathema b.25 January 1947	10 February 2004 – 28 June 2013	ZANU-PF	Robert Mugabe
Ministers of State for Provincial Affairs
1	Eunice Moyo; 8 November 1946 - 16 May 2024	11 September 2013 – 21 November 2017	ZANU-PF	Robert Mugabe
2	Angeline Masuku	4 December 2017 – 29 July 2018	ZANU-PF	Emmerson Mnangagwa
3	Judith Ncube	10 September 2018 – present	ZANU-PF	Emmerson Mnangagwa

== See also ==
- List of current provincial governors of Zimbabwe
