= Sesel =

Sesel may refer to:

- Seychelles, an Indian Ocean island state
- Sesel Zvidzai, Zimbabwean politician
