= List of ambassadors of Zimbabwe to China =

Ambassador of Zimbabwe to China
- Incumbent; Martin Chedondo since 28 August 2019
- Inaugural holder: Gabriel Phineas Chisese
- Formation: 1 June 1982

The Zimbabwean Ambassador in Beijing is the official representative of the Government in Harare to the Government of the People's Republic of China.

== List of ambassadors ==
Agrément/Diplomatic accreditation	Ambassador	Observations	List of presidents of Zimbabwe	List of premiers of China	Term end
1 June 1982	Gabriel Phineas Chisese	(gmt 1 Jun 82) Zimbabwe's first Ambassador to China Gabriel Phineas Chisese	Canaan Banana	Zhao Ziyang	
24 October 1990	Boniface Guwa Chidyausiku	Currently Zimbabwe’s Ambassador and Permanent Representative to the United Nations	Robert Mugabe	Li Peng	1996
30 May 1995	Lucas Pande Tavaya		Robert Mugabe	Li Peng	
17 December 2002	Christopher Mutsvangwa	He was Minister of Small and Medium Enterprises and Cooperative Development	Robert Mugabe	Zhu Rongji	2006
11 May 2007	Frederick Musiiwa Makamure Shava		Robert Mugabe	Wen Jiabao	2014
22 January 2015	Paul Chikawa	From 2010–2014 he was Consul General to Hong Kong	Robert Mugabe	Li Keqiang	
28 August 2019	Martin Chedondo		Emmerson Mnangagwa	Li Keqiang (until 11 March 2023) Li Qiang	

== See also ==
- China–Zimbabwe relations
