= Gutu North =

Abolished Zimbabwean constituency

- Former constituency for the National Assembly of Zimbabwe
- Province: Masvingo
- Region: Gutu District

Former constituency
- Created: 1985
- Abolished: 2023
- Seats: 1

Gutu North was a constituency represented in the National Assembly of the Parliament of Zimbabwe, located in Gutu District in Masvingo Province. It was abolished ahead of the 2023 general election.

== History ==
In a 2004 by-election, Air Chief Marshal Josiah Tungamirai (ZANU-PF) was elected to the House of Assembly to succeed incumbent Simon Muzenda, who had died the year before. Tungamirai died the next year.

In 2008, Edmore Maramwidze (MDC) won against Frank Machaya (ZANU-PF) for the constituency. The MP following the 2013 election was Ticharwa Madondo (ZANU-PF).

In the 2018 election, Yeukai Simbanegavi of ZANU–PF was elected to represent the constituency.

== Members ==
Election	Name	Party
1985	Oliver Munyaradzi	ZANU–PF
1990	Joseph Mandaba	ZANU–PF
1995	Simon Muzenda	ZANU–PF
2000	Simon Muzenda	ZANU–PF
2004 by-election	Josiah Tungamirai	ZANU–PF
2005	Josiah Tungamirai	ZANU–PF
2005 by-election	Lovemore Matuke	ZANU–PF
2008	Edmore Maramwidze	MDC–T
2013	Ticharwa Madondo	ZANU–PF
2018	Yeukai Simbanegavi	ZANU–PF

== See also ==
- List of Zimbabwean parliamentary constituencies
