= Minister of State for Provincial Affairs and Devolution for Harare =

- Incumbent; Charles Tawengwa since 12 September 2023
- Minister of State for Provincial Affairs
- Style: The Honourable
- Member of: Cabinet of Zimbabwe; Parliament of Zimbabwe
- Reports to: The President
- Seat: 109 Rotten Row, Harare
- Appointer: The President
- Term length: Five years, renewable for a second or subsequent term of office
- Constituting instrument: Provincial Councils and Administration Act (Chapter 29:11)
- Precursor: Provincial Governor of Harare (2004)
- Formation: 22 August 2013
- Deputy: Shingirayi Mushamba, Permanent Secretary for Provincial Affairs and Devolution - Harare
- Website: harareprovince.co.zw

The Minister of State for Provincial Affairs and Devolution for Harare is the Provincial Minister of State for Harare in Zimbabwe. The minister oversees provincial affairs and sits in the Parliament of Zimbabwe. The minister is appointed by the President of Zimbabwe and is appointed for a term of five years, which can be renewed for a second or subsequent term. Historically, the minister held the title Governor of Harare, but the office has since been renamed to align with the 2013 Constitution of Zimbabwe, which does not allow for Provincial Governors.

== List of Ministers ==
Parliamentary position: Elected Member of the House of Assembly Elected Member of the Senate Non-Elected Minister

No.	Name Birth–Death	Term in office	Party	Appointed by
Provincial Governors
1	Witness Mangwende; 15 August 1946 – 26 February 2005	10 February 2004 – 26 February 2005	ZANU-PF	Robert Mugabe
2	David Karimanzira; 25 May 1947 - 24 March 2011	15 April 2005 – 24 March 2011	ZANU-PF	Robert Mugabe
Ministers of State for Provincial Affairs
1	Miriam Chikukwa b.1963	11 September 2013 – 29 July 2018	ZANU-PF	Robert Mugabe; Emmerson Mnangagwa
2	Oliver Chidawu; 9 August 1954 - 19 July 2022	8 March 2019 – 19 July 2022	ZANU-PF	Emmerson Mnangagwa
3	Charles Tawengwa	12 September 2023 – present	ZANU-PF	Emmerson Mnangagwa

== See also ==
- List of current provincial governors of Zimbabwe
