= Supa Mandiwanzira =

Zimbabwean journalist and politician

The Right Honourable Supa Mandiwanzira MP

Minister of Information and Communications of Zimbabwe
- In office 10 November 2014 – 6 September 2018
- President: Robert Mugabe; Emmerson Mnangagwa
- Preceded by: Webster Shamu
- Succeeded by: Kazembe Kazembe

Member of the House of Assembly from Nyanga South
- Incumbent
- Assumed office 31 July 2013

Personal details
- Born: 18 September 1972 (age 54) Nyanga, Rhodesia now Zimbabwe
- Party: ZANU-PF
- Education: Harare Polytechnic; City University of London
- Profession: Journalist, businessman

Supa Collins Mandiwanzira (born 18 September 1972) is a Zimbabwean politician and journalist who served as the Minister of Information Communication Technology (2014-2017) and then Minister of Information Communication Technology and Cyber Security in the Cabinet of Zimbabwe from November 2017 to September 2018. His earlier portfolio had been merged with cybersecurity. He is a member of the Zanu-PF political party. He was the founder of the ZiFM Stereo radio station, and the online ZiTV station.

== Early background ==
Mandiwanzira was born in Nyanga, Manicaland Province. He did his primary education in Nyanga.He did his secondary education at Nyamauru High School in Dangamvura, Mutare.

== Career ==
Mandiwanzira started his journalism career by working for his local newspaper, The Manica Post. After attending journalism school at Harare Polytechnic, he worked for The Herald in Harare, primarily covering financial matters. Subsequently, he worked for the Zimbabwe Broadcasting Corporation (ZBC) for five years as a business and financial reporter. He then completed a master's degree in International Journalism at the City University of London. Whilst in London, he worked for the BBC and Reuters financial Television, as well as becoming the London correspondent of Summit Television, then a new business news channel based in South Africa jointly owned by the Financial Times from London and Times Media Ltd of South Africa.

Mandiwanzira was the managing director of the Africa Business Communications until 2002 when he became chief executive officer of Mighty Movies, following the purchase of the company from its original shareholders. He then worked for SABC, South Africa's State broadcaster, as the Zimbabwe Correspondent. Mandiwanzira joined the Al Jazeera English news channel as Zimbabwe correspondent. He left Al Jazeera to concentrate his business interests which included Civil Construction, Mining, Property Development, cinemas, radio and television production, and newspapers.

In the 2013 elections, he won a National Assembly seat on the ZANU-PF ticket for Nyanga South, and was appointed to serve as the Deputy Minister of Media, Information and Publicity (aka Deputy Minister of Information, Media and Broadcasting Services). In 2014 he became the Minister of Information Communication Technology, and after the reorganization in November 2017, he became the Minister of Information Communication Technology and Cyber Security.

He appeared on the BBC's HARDtalk television program on 13 May 2014, defending the Zimbabwean government's policies.

The former SABC and Aljazeera Zimbabwe correspondent has also recently launched ZiTV online through his Mighty Movies company.

In July 2018, he won re-election to his Nyanga South assembly seat. In September 2018 he was replaced as Minister Of ICT and Cyber Security by Kazembe Kazembe.

In November 2018 he was arrested on charges of corruption.

== Personal life ==
Mandiwanzira married his wife, Ruth, in 1998 and they have three children.
