= Mercy Dinha =

Zimbabwean politician

The Hon. Mercy Dinha MP

Deputy Minister of Public Service, Labour and Social Welfare
- Incumbent
- Assumed office 12 September 2023
- President: Emmerson Mnangagwa
- Minister: July Moyo (2017-2025); Edgar Moyo
- Preceded by: Lovemore Matuke

Member of Parliament for Zvimba West
- Incumbent
- Assumed office 4 September 2023
- President: Emmerson Mnangagwa
- Preceded by: Ziyambi Ziyambi
- Constituency: Zvimba West
- Majority: 3,922 (20.0%)

Personal details
- Born: 19 December 1971 (age 54) Lomagundi
- Party: ZANU-PF

Mercy Dinha is a Zimbabwean politician. She is the current Deputy Minister of Public Service, Labour and Social Welfare of Zimbabwe and a member of parliament. She is a member of ZANU–PF.
