= Anastacia Ndhlovu =

Zimbabwean politician

Anastacia Ndhlovu is a Zimbabwean politician from the Zimbabwe African National Union – Patriotic Front (ZANU–PF). She was Deputy Minister of Tourism and Hospitality from 2016 to 2019. Ndhlovu served as liaison between the ministry and parliament as well as the ruling party overseeing Human resources and administration within the Ministry of Tourism and Hospitality industry. Ndhlovu began her political career in 2000 when she joined the ZANU-PF party at the Midlands State University where she has served on its Central Committee and Youth League as Secretary for External Relations. In 2004, she joined the Zimbabwe Revenue Authority (ZIMRA) based at their Head Office, where she developed the Human Resource, Industrial relations, and Human Capital Development policies for the Authority.

She was a member of the Generation 40 faction.

== Education ==
She holds academic degrees from Midlands State University in Gweru, Zimbabwe (Bachelor of Science – Human Resource Management) and the Women’s University in Africa located in Harare, Zimbabwe (Master of Science in Development Studies).

Additional certifications include a qualification as DACUUM facilitator & SAP Super User for Human Resources. Ndhlovu also holds a certificate in labor relations from the Institute of personnel management in Zimbabwe.
