= Office of the President and Cabinet =

Agency overview
- Jurisdiction: Zimbabwe
- Headquarters: Munhumutapa Building, Samora Machel Avenue / Sam Nujoma Street, Harare, Zimbabwe
- Annual budget: ZiG14,733,850,983 (US$550,287,994) FY2025
- President responsible: Emmerson Mnangagwa, President of Zimbabwe
- Vice-Presidents responsible: Constantino Chiwenga, First Vice-President of Zimbabwe; Kembo Mohadi, Second Vice-President
- Agency executive: Dr Martin Rushwaya, Chief Secretary to the President and Cabinet
- Parent agency: Presidency
- Child agency: Cabinet
- Key document: Constitution of Zimbabwe
- Website: www.theopc.gov.zw

The Office of the President and Cabinet (OPC) is the principal coordinating office of the Government of Zimbabwe. It supports the President of Zimbabwe in exercising executive authority, services the Cabinet of Zimbabwe, and oversees the coordination, monitoring, and implementation of government policies and programmes across ministries and the public service.

The OPC is described as the lead office in the Government of Zimbabwe. It is headquartered in the Munhumutapa Building in central Harare. The office operates under the constitutional framework of the Constitution of Zimbabwe, particularly the provisions on the executive, Cabinet, and the Public Service.

The current President is Emmerson Mnangagwa. The Chief Secretary to the President and Cabinet, the most senior public servant and head of the OPC's civil service component, is Dr Martin Rushwaya, who was appointed in 2023.

== History ==
Following independence in 1980, Zimbabwe operated under the Lancaster House Constitution with a parliamentary system featuring a ceremonial President (Canaan Banana, 1980–1987) and an executive Prime Minister (Robert Mugabe). The 1987 constitutional amendments abolished the Prime Minister's post and established an executive presidency. Robert Mugabe was sworn in as the first executive President on 31 December 1987. The OPC developed as the primary support structure for the executive presidency and Cabinet coordination during this period.

The position of Chief Secretary to the President and Cabinet became prominent in the 2000s. Dr Misheck Sibanda was appointed Chief Secretary to the President and Cabinet in 2003, succeeding Dr Charles Utete, and served until his retirement in September 2023.

The 2013 Constitution formally entrenched the office. Section 204A provides that the Chief Secretary and deputies are appointed by the President after consultation with the Public Service Commission. The Chief Secretary is the most senior member of the Public Service, to whom Permanent Secretaries report on matters affecting them as a class.

Since the "New Dispensation" under President Mnangagwa (from November 2017), the OPC has emphasised a Whole-of-Government Approach, devolution and decentralisation (in line with Chapters 5 and 14 of the Constitution), performance contracting in the public sector, and coordination of flagship national programmes. Provincial and metropolitan offices support Ministers of State for Provincial Affairs and Devolution.

== Functions and organisation ==
The OPC performs the following core functions:

- Supervision and coordination of all aspects of the functions of the Office of the President, vice-presidents and Cabinet, including Cabinet Committee business;
- Supervision, monitoring and evaluation of the implementation of Government policies, decisions and programmes, and coordination of policy and programme reviews;
- Communication of decisions and directives of the Head of State and Government;
- Transmission to the President of proposals and recommendations from commissions and other constitutional or statutory bodies;
- Liaison with Heads of Ministries to achieve coherence, efficiency and effectiveness in government administration;
- Participation in domestic and international agencies, panels and committees;
- Liaison with civil society for problem-solving.

The office coordinates Cabinet processes: policy memoranda are submitted via the Chief Secretary, considered by Cabinet committees (often involving Permanent Secretaries), approved by Cabinet, and implemented by ministries. Post-Cabinet briefings communicate decisions publicly. The OPC also supports legislative processes by guiding principles of Bills through to drafting and submission to Parliament.

The OPC coordinates or houses several specialised functions, including Presidential Communications, devolution implementation support, and the Special Anti-Corruption Unit.

Provincial offices of the OPC facilitate coordination between central government and Provincial/Metropolitan Councils under the devolution agenda.

== See also ==
- President of Zimbabwe
- Vice-President of Zimbabwe
- Cabinet of Zimbabwe
- Constitution of Zimbabwe
