= Murewa North =

- Constituency for the National Assembly of Zimbabwe
- Province: Mashonaland East
- Region: Murehwa District

Current constituency
- Number of members: 1
- Party: ZANU–PF
- Member: Daniel Garwe

Murewa North, also spelled Murehwa North, is a constituency represented in the National Assembly of the Parliament of Zimbabwe, located in Murehwa District in Mashonaland East Province. Its current MP since the 2018 election is Daniel Garwe of ZANU–PF.

== See also ==
- List of Zimbabwean parliamentary constituencies
