= Sesel Zvidzai =

Zimbabwean politician

Sesel Zvidzai was the Zimbabwe Deputy Minister of Local Government and Urban Development. He is the Member of House of Assembly for Chiwundura (MDC-T). He is MP for Gweru Urban. MDC-T is not currently in government. He is married with four children.
