= Zimbabwe Tourism Authority =

Zimbabwe's tourism's governing body

The Zimbabwe Tourism Authority, is Zimbabwe's tourism's governing body formed as an act of parliament and operates under the mandate of the Tourism Act of Zimbabwe (Chapter 14:20) of 1996. It has its headquarters in the main business district of the capital city of Zimbabwe, Harare. The Zimbabwe Tourism Authority is mandated to market Zimbabwe and falls under the Ministry Of Tourism.

The Authority is headed by its chief executive Winnetka Muchanyuka.
