= Soda Zhemu =

Zimbabwean Politician

The Honourable Soda Zhemu MP
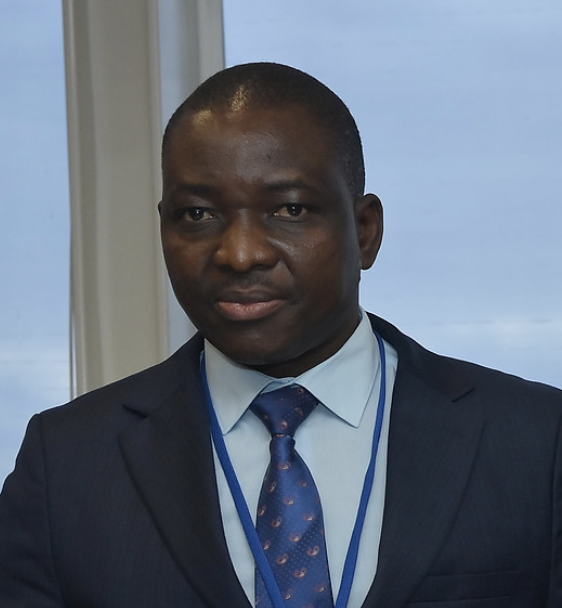
- Zhemu in 2021

Minister of National Housing and Social Amenities
- Incumbent
- Assumed office 24 April 2024
- President: Emmerson Mnangagwa
- Deputy: Musa Ncube
- Preceded by: Daniel Garwe

Member of Parliament for Muzarabani North
- Incumbent
- Assumed office 26 August 2018
- President: Emmerson Mnangagwa
- Preceded by: Alfred Mufunga
- Constituency: Muzarabani North
- Majority: 20,091 (87.6%)

Minister of Mines and Mining Development
- In office 12 September 2023 – 24 April 2024
- President: Emmerson Mnangagwa
- Deputy: Polite Kambamura
- Preceded by: Winston Chitando
- Succeeded by: Winston Chitando

Minister of Energy and Power Development
- In office 14 August 2020 – 22 August 2023
- President: Emmerson Mnangagwa
- Deputy: Magna Mudyiwa
- Preceded by: Fortune Chasi
- Succeeded by: Edgar Moyo

Personal details
- Born: 4 June 1974 (age 52) Centenary, Zimbabwe
- Party: ZANU-PF
- Education: Zimbabwe Open University

Soda Zhemu (born 4 June 1974) is a Zimbabwean politician, member of parliament and cabinet minister. Zhemu is a member of the ruling Zanu-PF party and represents the constituency of Muzarabani North.

In August 2020, Zhemu was appointed as the Minister of Energy and Power Development, replacing Fortune Chasi who was fired by President Emmerson Mnangagwa for conduct that "had become incompatible with the President’s expectations."

== Education ==
Zhemu attended Muzarabani Primary and Secondary Schools as well as Machaya Secondary School.

The Minister attained a BCOM degree in accounting from the Zimbabwe Open University. According to the Parliament of Zimbabwe website, Zhemu has a Masters in Business Administration (MBA) although the website does not specify the institution which awarded Zhemu the qualification.
