= Yeukai Simbanegavi =

Zimbabwean politician

The Hon. Yeukai Simbanegavi MP

Deputy Minister of Energy and Power Development
- Incumbent
- Assumed office 24 April 2024
- President: Emmerson Mnangagwa
- Minister: Edgar Moyo (2023-2025); July Moyo
- Preceded by: Magna Mudyiwa

Member of Parliament for the Masvingo Women's Quota
- Incumbent
- Assumed office 4 September 2023
- President: Emmerson Mnangagwa

Deputy Minister of National Housing and Social Amenities
- In office 8 November 2019 – 24 April 2024
- President: Emmerson Mnangagwa
- Minister: Daniel Garwe
- Preceded by: New Ministry
- Succeeded by: Musa Ncube

Member of Parliament for Gutu North
- In office 26 August 2018 – 22 August 2023
- President: Emmerson Mnangagwa
- Preceded by: Ticharwa Madondo
- Succeeded by: Constituency suppressed
- Constituency: Gutu North

Deputy Minister of Youth, Sport, Arts and Recreation
- In office 10 September 2018 – 8 November 2019
- President: Emmerson Mnangagwa
- Minister: Kirsty Coventry
- Preceded by: Pupurayi Togarepi (Youth Affairs)
- Succeeded by: Tinoda Machakaire

Personal details
- Born: 24 September 1978 (age 47)
- Party: ZANU–PF

Yeukai Simbanegavi is a Zimbabwean politician. She is the current Deputy Minister of Energy and Power Development and a member of parliament for the Masvingo Women's Quota. She is a member of ZANU–PF.
