= Hunyani (constituency) =

Zimbabwean constituency

- National Assembly constituency for the Parliament of Zimbabwe
- District: Harare
- Province: Harare
- Electorate: 37,623 (2023)

Current constituency
- Created: 2023
- Number of members: 1
- Party: ZANU-PF
- Member: Tongai Mafidi Mnangagwa

Hunyani is a constituency represented in the National Assembly of the Parliament of Zimbabwe. It was established through the 2023 delimitation report and was first contested at the 2023 general election. The current MP is Tongai Mafidi Mnangagwa of the ZANU-PF since the 2023 election.

== Members ==
Election	Name	Party
2023	Tongai Mafidi Mnangagwa	ZANU-PF

== See also ==
- List of Zimbabwean parliamentary constituencies
