= Christopher Mutsvangwa =

Zimbabwean politician, diplomat and businessman

The Honourable Ambassador Christopher Mutsvangwa Sen.

Senator for Mashonaland West
- Incumbent
- Assumed office 4 September 2023
- President: Emmerson Mnangagwa

ZANU-PF Secretary for Information
- Incumbent
- Assumed office 1 December 2021
- President: Emmerson Mnangagwa
- Preceded by: Simon Khaya Moyo

Minister of Veterans of the Liberation Struggle Affairs
- In office 12 September 2023 – 3 February 2024
- President: Emmerson Mnangagwa
- Deputy: Monicah Mavhunga
- Preceded by: New Ministry
- Succeeded by: Monicah Mavhunga

Chairman of the Zimbabwe National Liberation War Veterans Association
- In office 15 November 2014 – 12 October 2024
- Preceded by: Jabulani Sibanda
- Succeeded by: Cephas Ncube

Minister of Information, Publicity and Broadcasting Services
- In office 4 December 2017 – 7 September 2018
- President: Emmerson Mnangagwa
- Preceded by: Simon Khaya Moyo
- Succeeded by: Monica Mutsvangwa

Minister of Welfare Service for War Veterans, War Collaborators, Former Political Detainees and Restrictees
- In office 11 December 2014 – 5 March 2016
- President: Robert Mugabe
- Preceded by: New post
- Succeeded by: Tshinga Dube

Deputy Minister of Foreign Affairs
- In office 10 January 2014 – 11 December 2014
- President: Robert Mugabe
- Minister: Simbarashe Simbanenduku Mumbengegwi

Member of Parliament for Norton
- In office 31 July 2013 – 19 July 2016
- Preceded by: Edward Musumbu
- Succeeded by: Temba Mliswa
- Majority: 1,232 (5.9%)

Zimbabwean Ambassador to China
- In office 17 December 2002 – 1 December 2006
- Preceded by: Lucas Tavaya
- Succeeded by: Frederick Shava

Personal details
- Born: Christopher Hatikure Mutsvangwa; 24 May 1955 (age 71) Salisbury, Southern Rhodesia
- Party: ZANU-PF
- Spouse: Monica Parirenyatwa
- Education: University of Rhodesia; Boston University (BS); St. John's University (MBA)

Christopher Hatikure Mutsvangwa (born 24 May 1955) is a Zimbabwean politician, diplomat and businessman. A veteran of the Rhodesian Bush War, Mutsvangwa served the government of independent Zimbabwe and the ZANU-PF party in a number of roles, including as Director-General of the Zimbabwe Broadcasting Corporation, Ambassador to China, head of the Zimbabwe National Liberation War Veterans Association, and Veterans' Welfare Minister. He is married to Senator Monica Mutsvangwa.

In March 2016, he was suspended from ZANU-PF for 3 years for "gross misconduct and disloyalty" and fanning factionalism in the party. He has been accused of being a key figure in the 2017 Zimbabwean coup d'etat.

Mutsvangwa and his wife have parroted anti-Ndebele sentiments, with his wife mocking victims of the Gukurahundi Genocide.

== Early life and education ==
Christopher Hatikure Mutsvangwa was born on 24 May 1955 at Salisbury Central Hospital in Salisbury, Southern Rhodesia (now Harare). He spent his early childhood in the Salisbury suburb of Mbare before returning to his family's home region near Chief Nyamweda, Mashonaland Central. He did his primary education at Masawi and Marirangwe schools, and began his secondary studies at Kutama College before completing his A-Levels at St Augustine's High in Penhalonga .

Mutsvangwa was among just seven black students selected to enter the Faculty of Law of the then University of Rhodesia in 1975, but left shortly thereafter to join ZIPRA in Mozambique. He later completed his university education in the United States, receiving a BS in Management and Information Systems from Boston University in 1984 and an MBA from St. John's University in 1990.

== Political career ==
Mutsvangwa entered public life as a diplomat, serving at postings in Brussels under Ambassador Solomom J. Mahaka to the European Union and New York to the United Nations under Stan Mudenge. In 1989, he was part of the UN observer team that monitored Namibia's first general elections, which were won by SWAPO, led by Sam Nujoma. Mutsvangwa left diplomatic service in 1990.

In 1991, Mutsvangwa was appointed Director-General of the Zimbabwe Broadcasting Corporation. He stepped down in 1994 to return to the private sector, serving as an executive in the telecommunications industry. Returning to politics in 2000, he was elected ZANU-PF Party Secretary for Harare Province. In 2002, he was appointed Zimbabwean Ambassador to China, tasked with deepening the country's foreign policy reorientation away from the West towards China. He served for four years until 2006, leaving under a "cloud of controversy" due to party infighting.

In 2012, he was appointed Chairman of the Mineral Marketing Corporation of Zimbabwe. In the 2013 elections, he was returned as MP for Norton. He was appointed Deputy Minister of Foreign Affairs and then the first Minister for Welfare Services for War Veterans, War Collaborators, Former Political Detainees and Restrictees. Following his expulsion from ZANU-PF he was recalled from Parliament.

=== 2017 coup d'etat ===
An ally of ousted Vice President Emmerson Mnangagwa, Mutsvangwa praised Army General Constantino Chiwenga for "a bloodless correction of gross abuse of power" and hoped that the army would restore a "genuine democracy" and Zimbabwe as a "modern model nation" following the 2017 coup d'état. Mutsvangwa was said to be involved in negotiations for a transitional government with Mnangagwa and Morgan Tsvangirai.
