= Ministry of Skills Audit and Development =

Government ministry of Zimbabwe

Agency overview
- Formed: 12 September 2023; 3 years ago
- Type: Ministry
- Jurisdiction: Government of Zimbabwe
- Headquarters: 89 Kwame Nkurumah Ave, Corner Kwame Nkurumah Ave and Sam Nujoma Street, Harare; 17.827205195567895°S 31.050878173703268°E
- Minister responsible: Paul Mavima, Minister of Skills Audit and Development
- Agency executive: Egepha Victoria Jokomo, Permanent Secretary
- Website: zimskills.gov.zw

The Ministry of Skills Audit and Development is a department in the Government of Zimbabwe that is responsible for catalysing the transition of Zimbabwe to an upper middle-income economy by 2030, by ensuring the availability of an adequate and competent workforce. The incumbent minister is Paul Mavima, who was appointed in September 2023 when the Ministry was created.
