= ZimPost =

ZimPost is the name under which the Zimbabwe Posts (Pvt) Ltd. trades and is the company responsible for postal service in Zimbabwe.
