= Owen Ncube =

Zimbabwean politician

The Honourable Owen Ncube MP

Minister of State for Provincial Affairs and Devolution for Midlands
- Incumbent
- Assumed office 12 September 2023
- President: Emmerson Mnangagwa
- Preceded by: Larry Mavima
- In office 4 December 2017 – 29 July 2018
- Preceded by: Jason Machaya
- Succeeded by: Larry Mavima

Member of Parliament for Gokwe Kana
- Incumbent
- Assumed office 22 August 2013
- President: Robert Mugabe; Emmerson Mnangagwa
- Preceded by: Busy Ngwenya
- Constituency: Gokwe Kana
- Majority: 7,594 (41.6%)

Minister of State for National Security in the Office of the President and Cabinet
- In office 19 September 2018 – 10 January 2022
- President: Emmerson Mnangagwa
- Preceded by: Kembo Mohadi
- Succeeded by: Lovemore Matuke

Personal details
- Born: 17 April 1968 (age 58) Kwekwe, Zimbabwe
- Party: ZANU-PF

Owen Mudha Ncube is a Zimbabwean politician and former CIO Director. He has been serving as the country's Minister of State for Provincial Affairs and Devolution for Midlands since 11 September 2023.

== Timeline ==
Prior to his appointment to the role of minister of state for national security, Ncube was named the minister of state for Midlands Province upon President Emmerson Mnangagwa's ascension to power in 2017. Prior to his appointment to Zimbabwe's cabinet, Ncube served as Midland's provincial ZANU–PF youth league secretary for administration.

Under Ncube's leadership as national security minister, a crackdown was ordered against demonstrators who were protesting a 150 percent fuel hike in January 2019. Twelve people were killed during the protests. News reports documented at least sixty other people who were shot during the protests, tear gas was used by police against demonstrators and 600 people were arrested. An internet blackout was ordered by Ncube as the police and armed forces responded to the demonstrations, a decision that was later ruled to be an over-extension of power by a High Court judge.

Following the protests, Ncube was placed on a list of people banned from entry into the United States. He was also sanctioned by the U.S. Treasury Department. A sanctioned individual has their American assets frozen and firms that operate in the United States, or make payment in U.S. dollars, can not easily financially interact with people on the sanctioned list. On 1 February 2021, the United Kingdom imposed a travel ban and freezing of assets on Ncube, Isaac Moyo, Godwin Matanga, and Anselem Sanyatwe.

On 10 January 2022, President Mnangagwa dismissed Ncube as Minister of State for National Security. In a statement, Chief Secretary to the President and Cabinet, Misheck Sibanda, said Ncube had been removed for “conduct inappropriate for a Minister of Government”

In September 2023, he returned to the government as Midlands Provincial Affairs minister in the Third Cabinet of Emmerson Mnangagwa.
