= Headman Moyo =

Zimbabwean politician

The Hon. Headman Moyo Sen.

Deputy Minister of Veterans of the Liberation Struggle Affairs
- Incumbent
- Assumed office 24 April 2024
- President: Emmerson Mnangagwa
- Minister: Monicah Mavhunga
- Preceded by: Monicah Mavhunga

Senator for Matabeleland North
- Incumbent
- Assumed office 20 October 2023
- President: Emmerson Mnangagwa
- Preceded by: Obert Mpofu

Personal details
- Party: ZANU-PF

Headman Moyo is a Zimbabwean Senator for Matabeleland North and current Deputy Minister of Veterans of the Liberation Struggle Affairs. He was appointed to the Senate on 20 October 2023, following the withdrawal of Obert Mpofu.
