= Monicah Mavhunga =

Zimbabwean politician

The Honourable Monicah Mavhunga Sen.

Minister of Veterans of the Liberation Struggle Affairs
- Incumbent
- Assumed office 4 March 2024
- President: Emmerson Mnangagwa
- Deputy: Headman Moyo
- Preceded by: Christopher Mutsvangwa

Senator for Mashonaland Central
- Incumbent
- Assumed office 22 August 2013
- President: Robert Mugabe; Emmerson Mnangagwa

Deputy Minister of Veterans of the Liberation Struggle Affairs
- In office 12 September 2023 – 4 March 2024
- President: Emmerson Mnangagwa
- Minister: Christopher Mutsvangwa
- Preceded by: New Ministry
- Succeeded by: Headman Moyo

Minister of State for Mashonaland Central
- In office 10 September 2018 – 22 August 2023
- President: Emmerson Mnangagwa
- Preceded by: Martin Tafara Dinha
- Succeeded by: Christopher Magomo

Personal details
- Born: 23 November 1961 (age 64) Mount Darwin, Zimbabwe
- Party: ZANU-PF

Monicah Mavhunga was born on (23 November 1961) in Mount Darwin. Is a Zimbabwean politician. She is the current Deputy Minister of Veterans of Liberation of Zimbabwe and a member of parliament. She is the member of ZANU–PF.
