= Daniel Garwe =

Zimbabwean politician

The Honourable Daniel Garwe MP

Minister of Local Government and Public Works
- Incumbent
- Assumed office 24 April 2024
- President: Emmerson Mnangagwa
- Deputy: Benjamin Kabikira
- Preceded by: Winston Chitando

Member of Parliament for Murehwa North
- Incumbent
- Assumed office 26 August 2018
- President: Emmerson Mnangagwa
- Preceded by: Tendayi Makunde
- Constituency: Murehwa North
- Majority: 7,655 (32.3%)

Minister of National Housing and Social Amenities
- In office 8 November 2019 – 24 April 2024
- President: Emmerson Mnangagwa
- Deputy: Yeukai Simbanegavi
- Preceded by: July Moyo (as Minister of Local Government, Public Works and National Housing)
- Succeeded by: Zhemu Soda

Personal details
- Party: ZANU-PF

Daniel Garwe is a Zimbabwean politician, currently serving as Minister of Local Government and Public Works. He was first appointed to Zimbabwe's Cabinet in November 2019 as the first Minister of the National Housing and Social Amenities. As minister, he is overseeing a public-private partnership housing project to create housing for thousands.

Garwe was elected to the country's National Assembly in 2018, representing the constituency of Murehwa North.

Garwe worked in the construction industry before joining politics and owns Planet Building. He also plays an ownership role in Hastream Enterprises (Pvt) Ltd, Macheke Motors (Pvt) Ltd t/a Sebakwe Range Farm; Kudakawashe and Tafadzwa Garwe Family Trust.
