= Chido Sanyatwe =

Zimbabwean politician

The Hon. Chido Sanyatwe MP

Deputy Minister of Home Affairs and Cultural Heritage
- Incumbent
- Assumed office 18 September 2023
- President: Emmerson Mnangagwa
- Minister: Kazembe Kazembe
- Preceded by: Michael Madiro

Member of Parliament for Nyanga North
- Incumbent
- Assumed office 26 August 2018
- President: Emmerson Mnangagwa
- Preceded by: Douglas Togaraseyi Mwonzora
- Constituency: Nyanga North
- Majority: 4,626 (20.6%)

Personal details
- Born: 31 December 1975 (age 50) Manicaland
- Party: ZANU-PF

Chido Sanyatwe is a Zimbabwean politician. She is the current Deputy Minister of Home Affairs and Cultural Heritage of Zimbabwe and a member of parliament. She is the member of ZANU–PF.
