= Jenfan Muswere =

Zimbabwean politician

The Honourable Dr. Jenfan Muswere MP

Minister of Information, Publicity and Broadcasting Services
- Incumbent
- Assumed office 12 September 2023
- President: Emmerson Mnangagwa
- Deputy: Omphile Marupi
- Preceded by: Monica Mutsvangwa

Member of Parliament for Makoni West
- Incumbent
- Assumed office 26 August 2018
- President: Emmerson Mnangagwa
- Preceded by: Kudzanai Chipanga
- Constituency: Makoni West
- Majority: 4,964 (28.7%)

Minister of Information Communication Technology and Courier Services
- In office 8 November 2019 – 22 August 2023
- President: Emmerson Mnangagwa
- Preceded by: Kazembe Kazembe
- Succeeded by: Tatenda Mavetera

Deputy Minister of Information Communication Technology and Courier Services
- In office 10 September 2018 – 8 November 2019
- President: Emmerson Mnangagwa
- Succeeded by: Dingumuzi Phuti

Personal details
- Born: 19 December 1981 (age 44)
- Party: ZANU-PF

Jenfan Muswere is a Zimbabwean politician who is the current Minister of Information, Publicity and Broadcasting Services of Zimbabwe and a member of parliament. He is the member of ZANU–PF. He was appointed to the position on 11 September 2023. Previously, Muswere served in the Ministry of Communication Information Technology, Courier and Postal Services. Prior to his promotion as the Minister, he worked as the deputy minister in the same portfolio. His appointment came about when Kazembe was being reassigned to the Ministry of Home Affairs as well as Cultural Heritage on 8 November 2019.

== Background ==
=== Early life ===
Muswere was born on 19 December 1981, in Zimbabwe. He is a descendent of Paramount Chief Chingaira Nakoni Muswere. He did his primary at Victoria Primary School. He holds Masters of Business Administration in International Trade and PhD in ICT, Performance in Governance and second PHD in Strategy, PPP mining investments. He was born and raised in the family that supported the ZANU PF.

=== Political career ===
==== 1995–2017: First positions ====
Muswere started his political work as a member of Youth League in early 1995. He had held several positions including Secretary for Indigenization in the Harare Province before 2017. He later became the Vice Secretary of Finance in Manicaland Province as well as serving as the member committee for the Youth League.

Muswere held the role of the Provincial Secretary for the ICT in Main Wing and is the member of Central Committee.

In 2018, under Emmerson Mnangagwa in the Second Republic, he was elected as the MP for Makoni West, and served until 2023. He was then re-elected in the same constituency starting from 2023 to 2028. He was also part of Great Escape team and he attended the Politburo as an expert assistant on Blue Ocean Strategy.

==== 2018–2019: Ministries ====
Muswere was appointed in 2018 by Mnangagwa as the Deputy Minister for Postal and Courier Services and ICT. He was then later promoted to being the minister of Postal and Courier Services, ICT, with a serving term of from 2019 to 2023.

==== 2020s ====
In 2020, Muswere was appointed as the Chairman of Pan African Postal Union. After the elections of 2023, he was selected as the Minister of Publicity, Information and Broadcasting Services of Zimbabwe. During his term as the Minister of Postal and Courier Services as well as ICT, and some of his roles were achieved under the leadership of Mnangagwa. Such included the National Development Strategy 1, that focuses on the working Digital Economy, as well as ICT Policy for 2023 to 2028, Smart Zimbabwe Master Plan for 2020 to 2030, as well as the National Broadband Plan for 2020 to 2030. Other achievements included Cyber and Data Protection Act, National Learning Strategy, the Smart Health-telemedicine initiative, and the establishment of Data Centers and ICT gadget factories.

He also had corporate career and worked as a Projects Executive, Head of Training and Business Technical, General Manager for Coal, Brick Investments, as well as holding of director positions in the construction, and transport, as well as the ICT sectors. Muswere also managed the infrastructure flagship projects worth of millions of US Dollars.
