= Misheck Sibanda =

Zimbabwean politician

Chief Secretary to the President and Cabinet of Zimbabwe
- In office 21 November 2013 – 26 September 2023
- President: Robert Mugabe; Emmerson Mnangagwa
- Succeeded by: Martin Rushwaya

Personal details
- Party: ZANU–PF
- Education: University of Zimbabwe

Misheck Sibanda is a Zimbabwean politician. He was the former Chief Secretary to the President and Cabinet of Zimbabwe from 2013 to 2023 and a member of parliament. He is a member of ZANU–PF.
