= Dingumuzi Phuti =

Zimbabwean politician

The Hon. Dingumuzi Phuti MP

Deputy Minister of Information Communication Technology, Postal and Courier Services
- Incumbent
- Assumed office 8 November 2019
- President: Emmerson Mnangagwa
- Minister: Tatenda Mavetera
- Preceded by: Jenfan Muswere

Member of Parliament for Bulilima
- Incumbent
- Assumed office 4 September 2023
- President: Emmerson Mnangagwa
- Preceded by: New constituency
- Constituency: Bulilima
- Majority: 525 (3.4%)

Member of Parliament for Bulilima West
- In office 26 August 2018 – 22 August 2023
- President: Emmerson Mnangagwa
- Preceded by: Lungisani Nleya
- Succeeded by: Constituency suppressed
- Constituency: Bulilima West

Personal details
- Born: 14 April 1980 (age 46) Bulawayo, Zimbabwe
- Party: ZANU-PF
- Education: Zimbabwe Open University

Dingumuzi Phuti is a Zimbabwean politician. He is the current Deputy Minister of Information Communication Technology of Zimbabwe and a member of parliament. He is the member of ZANU–PF.
