= Edgar Moyo =

Zimbabwean politician

The Honourable Edgar Moyo MP

Minister of Public Service, Labour and Social Welfare
- Incumbent
- Assumed office 3 January 2025
- President: Emmerson Mnangagwa
- Deputy: Mercy Dinha
- Preceded by: July Moyo

Member of Parliament for Matobo
- Incumbent
- Assumed office 4 September 2023
- President: Emmerson Mnangagwa
- Preceded by: New constituency
- Majority: 1,147 (7.9%)

Minister of Energy and Power Development
- In office 12 September 2023 – 3 January 2025
- President: Emmerson Mnangagwa
- Deputy: Yeukai Simbanegavi
- Preceded by: Soda Zhemu
- Succeeded by: July Moyo

Member of Parliament for Matobo North
- In office 26 August 2018 – 22 August 2023
- President: Emmerson Mnangagwa
- Preceded by: Never Khanye
- Succeeded by: Constituency suppressed

Deputy Minister of Primary and Secondary Education
- In office 10 September 2018 – 22 August 2023
- President: Emmerson Mnangagwa
- Minister: Paul Mavima (2017-2019); Cain Mathema (2019-2021); Evelyn Ndlovu (2021-2023)
- Preceded by: Paul Mavima
- Succeeded by: Angeline Gata

Personal details
- Born: 19 April 1962 (age 64) Kezi, Southern Rhodesia, Federation of Rhodesia and Nyasaland (now Zimbabwe)
- Party: ZANU–PF
- Education: University of Pretoria; Zimbabwe Open University

Rafael Mariano Grossi, IAEA Director General met with Hon. Edgar Moyo, Minister of Energy and Power Development of Zimbabwe, during a bilateral meeting at the IAEA 68th General Conference held at the Agency headquarters in Vienna, Austria. 18 September 2024.

Edgar Moyo is a Zimbabwean politician. He is currently serving as the Minister of Public Service, Labour and Social Welfare. He also worked as the Minister of Energy until December 2024, deputy minister of the primary and secondary education. He is a member of ZANU–PF.

== Background ==
=== Early life ===
Moyo was born in 1962 at Kezi Hospital in Zimbabwe and grew up in Halale, an area near Njelele Shrine.

=== Secondary school education ===
He attended Tennyson Hlabangana Secondary School in the Hope Fountain in 1976. It is here where did his form one to Three around 1978. He abandoned the school when he was in form 3 in February 1978 and crossed the border that connects Botswana and Zimbabwe to join his military training for Rhodesian war.

Soon after the ceasefire, Moyo returned to his home in 1980 and returned to his high school, Tennyson Hlabangana to purse his Ordinary Level Studies. After the completion of his O Level, he was employed at Homestead Secondary School in Kezi as the temporary teacher.

=== Tertiary ===
In 1983, Moyo studied at Hillside Teachers' College in Zimbabwe to train as the secondary school teacher. He majored in the English subject and did second major in music. He obtained his degree at the University of Pretoria in Education Management. In 2011, he acquired his master's degree in business administration (MBA) from Zimbabwe Open University (ZOU). In 2018, he was enrolled for a PhD candidate with ZOU.

== Political career ==
Moyo was deployed to Botswana’s Selebi-Phikwe in the education department of the ZAPU to teach fellow recruits who were about to be transferred to Zambia for training. In the commissariat department, he was also deployed to dealing with various issues of the political education. After being the teacher training in 1987, he taught at Mzingwane High School before being moved in Kezi to Lubhangwe Secondary School. Due to shortage of secondary teachers, Moyo was appointed as the acting head of the school.

Moyo then was the head of the number of secondary schools such as Whitewater, Ratanyana, Sontala, St Sebastian and Silozwi in Kezi. He retired in July 2017 at Silozwi. In Zimta, Moyo rose through different ranks, up to the position of the national treasurer in 2008, an office he left on his retirement. During his service in Zimta, Moyo served in the National Council of Joint Negotiating for education sector that in 2014 he was appointed as the board member of theZimsec where he served until 2017.

He worked in the Zimbabwe Examinations Council as the board member, as well as at Zimbabwe Teachers' Association (Zimta) as the national treasurer.

Moyo also served as the finance committee member of the Southern African Teachers' Organisation.

As the result of the 2023 elections, Emmerson Mnangagwa announced his newly sworn cabinet on 11 September 2023 where moyo was the Minister of Energy and Power Development.

=== Business ===
Moyo is reported to own a rancher of cattle in Kezi.

== Travels ==
On 7 March 2024, Minister Moyo attended energy summit in the US.

== Events ==
=== Nominational Court 2023 ===
The ZEC announced the list of the candidates for its 2023 elections for the Matabeleland South. For Matobo Constituency, Moyo won the elections beating Nicholas Abson Dube of ZAPU, Collen Ngwenya of CCC Party and Mlungisi Nyathi of Independent Party.
