= Marian Chombo =

Zimbabwean politician

The Honourable Marian Chombo MP

Minister of State for Provincial Affairs and Devolution for Mashonaland West
- Incumbent
- Assumed office 12 September 2023
- President: Emmerson Mnangagwa
- Preceded by: Mary Mliswa

Member of Parliament for Zvimba North
- Incumbent
- Assumed office 26 August 2018
- President: Emmerson Mnangagwa
- Preceded by: Ignatius Chombo
- Majority: 15,234 (58.6%)

Deputy Minister of Local Government, Public Works and National Housing
- In office 8 November 2019 – 22 August 2023
- President: Emmerson Mnangagwa
- Minister: July Moyo
- Preceded by: Benjamin Kabikira

Personal details
- Born: 11 August 1960 (age 65) Chipinge
- Party: ZANU-PF
- Spouse: Ignatius Chombo (m. 1993; div. 2012)

Marian Chombo is a Zimbabwean politician. She is the current Provincial Affairs Minister and a member of parliament representing Mashonaland West. She is a member of ZANU–PF.

== See also ==
- Politics of Zimbabwe
