= Benjamin Kabikira =

Zimbabwean politician

The Hon. Benjamin Kabikira MP

Deputy Minister of Local Government and Public Works
- Incumbent
- Assumed office 3 February 2024
- President: Emmerson Mnangagwa
- Minister: Winston Chitando (2024); Daniel Garwe
- Preceded by: Marian Chombo

Member of Parliament for Muzarabani South
- Incumbent
- Assumed office 4 September 2023
- President: Emmerson Mnangagwa
- Preceded by: Saizi Tapera
- Constituency: Muzarabani South
- Majority: 20,542 (83.8%)

Personal details
- Born: 22 October 1989 (age 36) Mutasa, Zimbabwe
- Party: ZANU-PF
- Education: University of Zimbabwe

Benjamin Kabikira is a Zimbabwean politician. He is the current Deputy Minister of Local Government and Public Works of Zimbabwe and a member of parliament. He is the member of ZANU–PF.
