= July Moyo =

Zimbabwean Parliament Member

The Honourable July Moyo MP

Minister of Energy and Power Development
- Incumbent
- Assumed office 3 January 2025
- President: Emmerson Mnangagwa
- Deputy: Yeukai Simbanegavi
- Preceded by: Edgar Moyo

Member of Parliament for Redcliff
- Incumbent
- Assumed office 4 September 2023
- President: Emmerson Mnangagwa
- Preceded by: Lloyd Mukapiko
- Constituency: Redcliff
- Majority: 1,815 (7.9%)

Minister of Public Service, Labour and Social Welfare
- In office 12 September 2023 – 3 January 2025
- President: Emmerson Mnangagwa
- Deputy: Mercy Dinha
- Preceded by: Sekai Nzenza
- Succeeded by: Edgar Moyo

Minister of Local Government and Public Works
- In office 8 November 2019 – 22 August 2023
- President: Emmerson Mnangagwa
- Deputy: Marian Chombo
- Preceded by: Himself (as Minister of Local Government, Public Works and National Housing)
- Succeeded by: Winston Chitando

Minister of Local Government, Public Works and National Housing
- In office 30 November 2017 – 8 November 2019
- President: Emmerson Mnangagwa
- Deputy: Jennifer Mhlanga
- Preceded by: Saviour Kasukuwere
- Succeeded by: Himself (as Minister of Local Government and Public Works); Daniel Garwe (as Minister of National Housing and Social Amenities)

Personal details
- Born: 7 May 1950 (age 76)
- Party: ZANU–PF

July Gabarari Moyo (born 7 May 1950) is a Zimbabwean parliamentarian and member of Zanu-PF. He has been a member of cabinet in both Robert Mugabe and Emmerson Mnangagwa governments. Moyo is currently the Minister of Energy and Power Development.

He was elected MP for Redcliff in the 2023 Zimbabwean general election.

== Political career ==
In 1999, Moyo was appointed the governor of Midlands Province.

In July 2000, Moyo was appointed the Minister of Public Service, Labour and Social Welfare in Robert Mugabe's government, a position he held until February 2004.

He was placed on the United States sanctions list from 2003 to 2005.

In February 2004, Robert Mugabe appointed Moyo to be the country's Minister of Energy and Power Development. He held the position until April 2005.

When Emmerson Mnangagwa came to power in November 2017, Moyo was returned to cabinet to lead the Ministry of Local Government, Public Works and National Housing.
