= Paul Mavima =

Zimbabwean politician

The Honourable Prof. Paul Mavima MP

Minister of National Housing and Social Amenities
- Incumbent
- Assumed office 12 September 2023
- President: Emmerson Mnangagwa
- Preceded by: New Ministry

Member of Parliament for Gokwe Sengwa
- Incumbent
- Assumed office 22 August 2013
- President: Robert Mugabe; Emmerson Mnangagwa
- Preceded by: Shaddy Sai
- Constituency: Gokwe Sengwa
- Majority: 9,899 (58.4%)

Minister of Public Service, Labour and Social Welfare
- In office 8 November 2019 – 22 August 2023
- President: Emmerson Mnangagwa
- Preceded by: Sekai Nzenza
- Succeeded by: July Moyo

Minister of Primary and Secondary Education
- In office 4 December 2017 – 8 November 2019
- President: Emmerson Mnangagwa
- Preceded by: Lazarus Dokora
- Succeeded by: Cain Mathema

Deputy Minister of Primary and Secondary Education
- In office 10 January 2014 – 4 December 2017
- President: Robert Mugabe; Emmerson Mnangagwa
- Preceded by: Lazarus Dokora
- Succeeded by: Edgar Moyo

Personal details
- Born: 25 September 1963 (age 63)
- Party: ZANU-PF
- Education: Florida State University

Paul Mavima is Zimbabwe's Minister of National Housing and Social Amenities and a member of Zanu-PF. He has also served as the Minister of Primary and Secondary Education and the Deputy Minister of Primary and Secondary Education in the Emmerson Mnangagwa government.

== Education and career ==
Mavima completed a Ph.D. in Public Administration from Florida State University in 1999. After finishing his Ph.D., he worked at the Florida Legislature's Office of Program Policy Analysis and Government Accountability. He returned to Zimbabwe and was employed as the Principal Director in the government's Office of Deputy Prime Minister in 2009. He first ran for election in 2013.
