= Tongai Mnangagwa =

Zimbabwean politician

The Hon. Tongai Mnangagwa MP
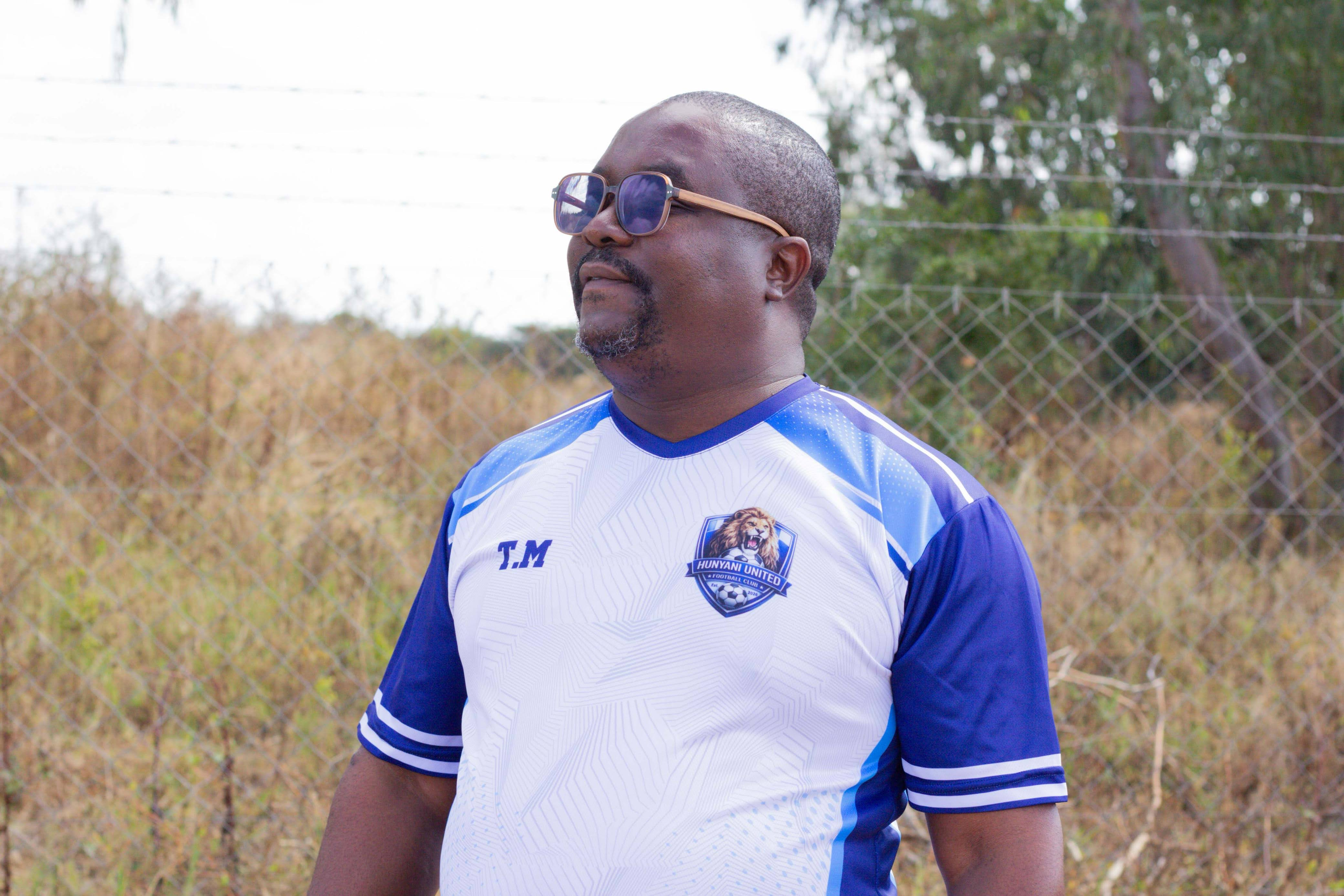
- Hon Tongai Mnangagwa

Deputy Minister of Tourism and Hospitality Industry
- Incumbent
- Assumed office 12 September 2023
- President: Emmerson Mnangagwa
- Minister: Barbara Rwodzi
- Preceded by: Barbara Rwodzi

Member of Parliament for Hunyani
- Incumbent
- Assumed office 4 September 2023
- President: Emmerson Mnangagwa
- Preceded by: New constituency
- Constituency: Hunyani
- Majority: 3,014 (11.4%)

Member of Parliament for Harare South
- In office 26 August 2018 – 22 August 2023
- President: Emmerson Mnangagwa
- Preceded by: Shadreck Mashayamombe
- Succeeded by: Trymore Kanupula
- Constituency: Harare South

Personal details
- Born: Tongai Mafidi Mnangagwa; 10 February 1978 (age 48) Zambia
- Party: ZANU–PF
- Spouse: Gwendolyn Linah Dawn Mnangagwa (m. 2001)
- Relations: Emmerson Mnangagwa (uncle); Auxillia Mnangagwa (aunt)
- Children: 8
- Education: Harare Polytechnic; Zimbabwe Open University
- Occupation: Politician, businessman, philanthropist
- Website: mafidi.com

Tongai Mafidi Mnangagwa (born 10 February 1978) is a Zimbabwean politician who currently serves as the Deputy Minister of Tourism and Hospitality Industry and the Member of Parliament for Hunyani constituency. He is the nephew of President Emmerson Mnangagwa.

== Early life and education ==
Mnangagwa was born on 10 February 1978 in Zambia. He moved to Zimbabwe as a young child, attending Haig Park Primary School in Harare. He did his O Levels at Gokomere High School, a Catholic boarding school in Masvingo Province, before completing his secondary education at Prince Edward School, a government high school in Harare. He then attended Harare Polytechnic, where he earned a certificate in marketing. Hon Mnangagwa holds a Bachelor of Science Honors in Development Studies from the Zimbabwe Open University and is currently pursuing a Master of Social Science in Development Studies from the same university.

== Political career ==
Mnangagwa joined ZANU–PF at age 18, and became the youth chairperson for the party's Tangwena District at age 20. Later, he moved to Harare South and joined the party's Leopold Takawira District as a committee member, later rising to become the political commissar of the main board.

In 2018, Mnangagwa was ZANU–PF's candidate for the House of Assembly in the 2018, running against over a dozen other candidates. On election day, Mnangagwa won with a 39% plurality, defeating the two MDC Alliance candidates, incumbent Shadreck Mashayamombe, and Tichaona Saurombe, who received 24% and 12%, respectively, as well as the MDC–T candidate, Desmond Jambaya, who earned 6% of the vote. He was sworn into Parliament on 5 September 2018.

In the 2023 general election, he was elected to the newly established constituency of Hunyani.

== Business and philanthropic work ==
Mnangagwa is the founder and trustee of the Tonganyika Trust, a charitable organization. He is the founder of Hunyani Football Club, Hunyani Queens football club, and Hunyani Queens netball team. He also serves as Executive Chairman of ProRata Zimbabwe Pvt Ltd.

== Personal life ==
Mnangagwa is married and lives in the Hunyani Constituency of Harare. He has eight children with his wife, Gwendolyn Mnangagwa.

== Electoral history ==
2023 Zimbabwean general election
Candidate	Party	Votes	%
Tongai Mafidi Mnangagwa	ZANU–PF	13,249	49.98
Lovemore Chinoputsa	CCC	10,235	38.61
Terrence Khumbula	CCC	2,644	9.98
Pattence Baudi	United Zimbabwe Alliance	258	0.97
Sarvory Pedzisai Masunga	ZNRP	120	0.45
Total		26,506	100.00
Majority		3,014	11.37
ZANU–PF win (new constituency)			
Source: ZEC

2018 Zimbabwean general election
Candidate	Party	Votes	%
Tongai Mafidi Mnangagwa	ZANU–PF	24,503	38.70
Shadreck Mashayamombe	MDC Alliance	21,371	33.75
Tichaona Samuel Saurombe	MDC Alliance	7,673	12.12
Desmond Jambaya	MDC-T	4,016	6.34
Robson Kazetete	Independent	1,836	2.90
Maxwell Munondo	Independent	1,274	2.01
Tatenda Chigwada	People's Rainbow Coalition	673	1.06
Spencer Chiwanika	New Patriotic Front	617	0.97
Elliot Piki	Independent	398	0.63
Nathan Muchazondida Nyambuya	Independent	336	0.53
Hearvy Ndagurwa	Zimbabwe Partnership for Prosperity	192	0.30
Gaylord Kurisa Kurisa	Build Zimbabwe Alliance	150	0.24
Runwork Mharadze	National Constitutional Assembly	142	0.22
Super Tanyiswa	Independent	136	0.21
Total		63,317	100.00
Valid votes		63,317	98.23
Invalid/blank votes		1,142	1.77
Total votes		64,459	100.00
Registered voters/turnout		76,425	84.34
Majority		3,132	4.95
ZANU–PF hold			
Source: ZEC

== See also ==
- List of members of the 9th Parliament of Zimbabwe
