= Ministry of Women Affairs, Community, Small and Medium Enterprises Development (Zimbabwe) =

Government ministry of Zimbabwe

Ministry overview
- Headquarters: 8th Floor Kaguvi Building, Corner Simon Muzenda St and Central Ave, Harare; 17.82373693092305°S 31.054008715904587°E
- Minister responsible: Monica Mutsvangwa, Minister of Women Affairs, Community, Small and Medium Enterprises Development
- Deputy Ministers responsible: Jennifer Mhlanga, Deputy Minister of Women Affairs, Community, Small and Medium Enterprises Development; Kiven Mutimbanyoka, Deputy Minister of Women Affairs, Community, Small and Medium Enterprises Development
- Ministry executive: Mavis Sibanda, Permanent Secretary
- Website: mwacsmed.gov.zw

The Ministry of Women Affairs, Community, Small and Medium Enterprises Development is a government ministry, responsible for gender and community issues in Zimbabwe. The current minister is Monica Mutsvangwa and the Deputy is Jennifer Mhlanga.

It was established in 2005 and was headed by Opa Muchinguri from its inception until January 3, 2009, when she was dismissed from office. Sithembiso Nyoni gained the portfolio of the office for a time.

On 30 November 2017, President Emmerson Mnangagwa appointed Sithembiso Nyoni as the minister for Women's affairs as well as for Youth affairs
