= Jennifer Mhlanga =

Zimbabwean politician

The Hon. Jennifer Mhlanga MP

Deputy Minister of Women Affairs, Community, Small and Medium Enterprises Development
- Incumbent
- Assumed office 8 November 2019 Serving with Kiven Mutimbanyoka
- President: Emmerson Mnangagwa
- Minister: Sithembiso Nyoni (2019-2023); Monica Mutsvangwa
- Preceded by: Abigail Damasane

Member of Parliament for the Mashonaland West Women's Quota
- Incumbent
- Assumed office 22 August 2013
- President: Robert Mugabe; Emmerson Mnangagwa

Personal details
- Party: ZANU-PF

Jennifer Mhlanga is a Zimbabwean politician. She is the current Deputy Minister of Women's Affairs, Community and SMEs of Zimbabwe and a member of parliament. She is a member of ZANU–PF.
