= Martin Dinha =

Zimbabwean politician

The Right Honourable Martin Dinha

Provincial Governor of Mashonaland Central
- In office 24 August 2008 – 29 July 2018
- President: Robert Mugabe
- Prime Minister: Morgan Tsvangirai

Personal details
- Party: ZANU-PF

Martin Dinha is the Provincial Governor and resident minister of Mashonaland Central, Zimbabwe . He is a member of the ZANU-PF party and an ex officio member of the Senate of Zimbabwe. He is a former Mayor of Bindura.
