= Tatenda Mavetera =

Zimbabwean politician

The Honourable Tatenda Mavetera MP

Minister of Information Communication Technology, Postal and Courier Services
- Incumbent
- Assumed office 12 September 2023
- President: Emmerson Mnangagwa
- Deputy: Dingumuzi Phuti
- Preceded by: Jenfan Muswere

Member of Parliament for Chikomba West
- Incumbent
- Assumed office 4 September 2023
- President: Emmerson Mnangagwa
- Preceded by: John Mangwiro
- Constituency: Chikomba West
- Majority: 11,760 (42.8%)

Member of Parliament for Mashonaland East Women's Quota
- In office 26 August 2018 – 22 August 2023
- President: Emmerson Mnangagwa
- Preceded by: Mabel Kaundikiza
- Succeeded by: Emily Jesaya
- Constituency: Mashonaland East Women's Quota

Personal details
- Born: Tatenda Annastacia Mavetera; 26 May 1986 (age 40) Gutu
- Party: ZANU-PF
- Education: Midlands State University; Women's University in Africa

Tatenda Annastacia Mavetera is a Zimbabwean politician. She is the Minister of Information Communication Technology, Postal and Courier Services of Zimbabwe and a member of parliament. She is a member of ZANU–PF.
