= Monica Mutsvangwa =

Zimbabwean minister (born 1961)

The Honourable Monica Mutsvangwa Sen.

Minister of Women Affairs, Community, Small and Medium Enterprises Development
- Incumbent
- Assumed office 12 September 2023
- President: Emmerson Mnangagwa
- Deputy: Jennifer Mhlanga
- Preceded by: Sithembiso Nyoni

Senator for Manicaland
- Incumbent
- Assumed office 22 August 2013
- President: Emmerson Mnangagwa
- Preceded by: New seat

Minister of Information, Publicity and Broadcasting Services
- In office 10 September 2018 – 22 August 2023
- President: Emmerson Mnangagwa
- Deputy: Energy Mutodi
- Preceded by: Christopher Mutsvangwa
- Succeeded by: Jenfan Muswere

Minister of State for Manicaland
- In office 2 December 2017 – 29 July 2018
- President: Emmerson Mnangagwa
- Preceded by: Mandi Chimene
- Succeeded by: Ellen Gwaradzimba

Deputy Minister of Macro-Economic Planning and Investment Promotion
- In office 10 September 2015 – 9 March 2016
- President: Robert Mugabe
- Minister: Obert Mpofu
- Preceded by: New Ministry

Deputy Minister of Information, Media and Broadcasting Services
- In office 11 December 2014 – 10 September 2015
- President: Robert Mugabe
- Minister: Jonathan Moyo
- Preceded by: Supa Collins Mandiwanzira
- Succeeded by: Thokozile Mathuthu

Senator for Chimanimani
- In office 29 March 2008 – 28 June 2013
- President: Emmerson Mnangagwa
- Preceded by: New seat
- Succeeded by: Seat suppressed

Personal details
- Born: 28 November 1961 (age 64) Gombakomba Village, Zimunya, Manicaland
- Party: ZANU-PF
- Spouse: Christopher Mutsvangwa

Monica Mutsvangwa is Zimbabwe's Minister of Women Affairs, Community, Small and Medium Enterprises Development. She previously served as the Minister of Information, Publicity and Broadcasting Services. Mutsvangwa has also held cabinet roles in both the Robert Mugabe government and the Emmerson Mnangagwa government.

She has been active in Zimbabwe's politics since 2002 when she ran as a councillor in Harare's municipal elections. She is affiliated with Zanu-PF. In Robert Mugabe's government, she served as the Deputy Minister of Information, Media and Broadcasting Services and the Deputy Minister Macro-Economic Planning and Investment Promotion.
