= Christopher Magomo =

Zimbabwean politician

The Honourable Christopher Magomo MP

Minister of State for Provincial Affairs and Devolution for Mashonaland Central
- Incumbent
- Assumed office 12 September 2023
- President: Emmerson Mnangagwa
- Preceded by: Monicah Mavhunga

Member of Parliament for Guruve South
- Incumbent
- Assumed office 4 September 2023
- President: Emmerson Mnangagwa
- Preceded by: Patrick Dutiro
- Constituency: Guruve South
- Majority: 16,117 (64.9%)

Personal details
- Born: 15 July 1975 (age 50) Guruve
- Party: ZANU-PF

Christopher Magomo is a Zimbabwean politician who served as the Member of Parliament for Chikomba East constituency in the House of Assembly of Zimbabwe. He is the current Provincial Affairs Minister and a member of parliament representing Mashonaland Central. He is the member of ZANU–PF.

== Background ==
=== Early life ===
Christopher Magomo was born on August 15, 1965, in Chikomba District, Zimbabwe. He grew up in a family of six children and was raised by his parents, who were both farmers. Magomo completed his primary education at Chikomba Primary School and his secondary education at Chikomba Secondary School.

=== Career ===
Magomo started his career as a teacher and later became a businessman. He entered politics in the early 2000s and joined the Zimbabwe African National Union-Patriotic Front (ZANU-PF) party. He was elected as the Member of Parliament for Chikomba East constituency in 2013 and served until 2018.

== Achievements ==
Some of Magomo's notable achievements include:

- Improving access to education and healthcare in his constituency
- Supporting agricultural development and empowering local farmers
- Advocating for infrastructure development and road construction
- Promoting youth empowerment and entrepreneurship

=== Other ventures ===
In addition to his political career, Magomo has also worked as a farmer and businessman. He has also served as a member of the Zimbabwe National Liberation War Veterans Association.

== Awards and honors ==
Magomo has received several awards for his contributions to public service and community development, including the Zimbabwe Government's Medal of Honor and the Chikomba District Community Service Award.
