= Ministry of Tourism and Hospitality Industry (Zimbabwe) =

Former government ministry of Zimbabwe

Ministry overview
- Preceding agencies: Environment, Climate Change, Tourism and Hospitality Industry (2019-2023); Environment, Tourism and Hospitality Industry (2018-2019); Tourism and Hospitality Industry (2017-2018); Tourism, Hospitality Industry and Environment (pre-2017)
- Jurisdiction: Government of Zimbabwe
- Headquarters: 55 Samora Machel Avenue, Harare; 17.827100154203652°S 31.04800406671462°E
- Minister responsible: Barbara Rwodzi, Minister of Tourism and Hospitality Industry
- Deputy Minister responsible: Tongai Mnangagwa, Deputy Minister of Tourism and Hospitality Industry
- Child Ministry: Zimbabwe Tourism Authority
- Website: zimbabwetourism.net

The Ministry of Tourism and Hospitality Industry is a government ministry in Zimbabwe, responsible for tourism in Zimbabwe. The current minister is Barbara Rwodzi.

== Authorities ==
The 'Ministry of Tourism and Hospitality Industry oversaw:

- Zimbabwe Tourism Authority

== Leaders ==
Ministers

- December 2017 to August 2019, Prisca Mupfumira
- August 2019 to November 2019, as acting Minister, Nqobizitha Mangaliso Ndlovu
- November 2019, ministry dissolved and recombined as Ministry of the Environment, Climate Change, Tourism and Hospitality Industry under Nqobizitha Mangaliso Ndlovu.

Deputy Ministers
- Annastacia Ndhlovu
