= Martin Rushwaya =

Zimbabwean politician

Dr Martin Rushwaya

Chief Secretary to the President and Cabinet of Zimbabwe
- Incumbent
- Assumed office 26 September 2023
- President: Emmerson Mnangagwa
- Preceded by: Misheck Sibanda

Personal details
- Party: ZANU–PF
- Education: University of KwaZulu Natal

Martin Rushwaya is a Zimbabwean politician. He is the current Chief Secretary to the President and Cabinet of Zimbabwe and a member of parliament. He is a member of ZANU–PF.

Prior to his appointment as the Chief Secretary to the President and Cabinet, Rushwaya served as Deputy Chief Secretary for Administration and Finance after being appointed by President Mnangagwa in 2019.

Rushwaya served as the Midlands Provincial Administrator before he was appointed as the Principal Director under the office of the Minister without Portfolio in the office of the President and Cabinet in 2005.

In 2007, Rushwaya was reassigned as the Principal Director for Anti-Corruption and Anti-Monopolies. In that same year he was appointed into the Grain Marketing Board, which had been operating without a board three years prior.

Dr Rushwaya also served as the Permanent Secretary in the Ministry of Defence.
