= Ministry of Information Communication Technology, Postal and Courier Services (Zimbabwe) =

Government ministry of Zimbabwe

Ministry overview
- Jurisdiction: Government of Zimbabwe
- Headquarters: 76 Samora Machel Avenue, Harare; 17.82765°S 31.04391°E
- Minister responsible: Tatenda Mavetera, Minister of Information Communication Technology, Postal and Courier Services
- Deputy Minister responsible: Dingumuzi Phuti, Deputy Minister of Information Communication Technology, Postal and Courier Services
- Ministry executive: B. Chirume, Secretary
- Child agencies: POTRAZ; ZimPost; ZARNet
- Website: ictministry.gov.zw

The Ministry of Information and Communications Technology is a government ministry, responsible for postal services, telephones and information technology in Zimbabwe. The incumbent is Monica Mutsvangwa. It oversees:

- Net*One
- TelOne
- Zimpost

Zimbabwe in the past 20 years between 2000 and 2020 has seen internet penetration increase by 11,567%
