= Omphile Marupi =

Zimbabwean politician

The Hon. Dr. Omphile Marupi MP

Deputy Minister of Information, Publicity and Broadcasting Services
- Incumbent
- Assumed office 3 February 2024
- President: Emmerson Mnangagwa
- Minister: Jenfan Muswere
- Preceded by: Energy Mutodi

Member of Parliament for Gwanda South
- Incumbent
- Assumed office 4 September 2023
- President: Emmerson Mnangagwa
- Preceded by: Abedinico Ncube
- Constituency: Gwanda South
- Majority: 2,842 (20.9%)

Personal details
- Born: 18 September 1971 (age 54) Gwanda Manana Hospital, Gwanda, Matabeleland South
- Party: ZANU-PF

Omphile Marupi is a Zimbabwean politician. He is the current Deputy Minister of Information and a member of parliament. He is the member of ZANU–PF.
