= Polite Kambamura =

Zimbabwean politician

The Hon. Polite Kambamura MP

Minister of Mines and Mining Development
- Incumbent
- Assumed office 8 December 2025
- President: Emmerson Mnangagwa
- Preceded by: Winston Chitando

Member of Parliament for Sanyati
- Incumbent
- Assumed office 26 August 2018
- President: Emmerson Mnangagwa
- Preceded by: Blessed Runesu
- Constituency: Sanyati
- Majority: 12,631 (55.6%)

Deputy Minister of Mines and Mining Development
- In office 10 September 2018 – 8 December 2025
- President: Emmerson Mnangagwa
- Minister: Winston Chitando (2018-2023; 2024-2025); Soda Zhemu (2023-2024)
- Succeeded by: Fred Moyo

Personal details
- Born: 2 February 1977 (age 49) Bindura, Zimbabwe
- Party: ZANU-PF
- Education: University of Zimbabwe (BSc)

Polite Kambamura is a Zimbabwean politician. He is the current Minister of Mines and Mining Development of Zimbabwe and a member of parliament. He is the member of ZANU–PF. Kambamura graduated from the University of Zimbabwe with a BSc in mining engineering in 2002 before working in mines in Zimbabwe and South Africa.
