= Judith Ncube =

Zimbabwean politician

The Honourable Judith Ncube MP

Minister of State for Provincial Affairs and Devolution for Bulawayo
- Incumbent
- Assumed office 10 September 2018
- President: Emmerson Mnangagwa
- Preceded by: Angeline Masuku

Member of Parliament for the Bulawayo Women's Quota
- Incumbent
- Assumed office 26 August 2018
- President: Emmerson Mnangagwa

Personal details
- Born: Judith Mkwanda
- Party: ZANU-PF

Judith Mkwanda Ncube is a Zimbabwean politician. She is the current Provincial Affairs Minister and a member of parliament representing Bulawayo. She is the member of ZANU–PF.
