= Barbara Rwodzi =

Zimbabwean politician

The Honourable Barbara Rwodzi MP

Minister of Tourism and Hospitality Industry
- Incumbent
- Assumed office 12 September 2023
- President: Emmerson Mnangagwa
- Deputy: Tongai Mnangagwa
- Preceded by: Mangaliso Ndlovu

Member of Parliament for Chirumanzu
- Incumbent
- Assumed office 26 August 2018
- President: Emmerson Mnangagwa
- Preceded by: Innocent Pedzisai
- Constituency: Chirumanzu
- Majority: 3,125 (17.6%)

Deputy Minister of Environment, Climate Change, Tourism and Hospitality Industry
- In office 2 December 2021 – 22 August 2023
- President: Emmerson Mnangagwa
- Minister: Mangaliso Ndlovu
- Preceded by: Anastancia Ndhlovu
- Succeeded by: Tongai Mnangagwa

Personal details
- Born: 16 August 1975 (age 51) Charandura, Chirumhanzu District, Rhodesia (now Zimbabwe)
- Party: ZANU-PF
- Education: Nottingham Trent University

Barbara Rwodzi is a Zimbabwean politician. She is the current Minister of Tourism and Hospitality Industry and a Member of Parliament for Chirumanzu. She is a member of ZANU–PF.
