= Charles Tawengwa =

Zimbabwean politician

The Honourable Charles Tawengwa Sen.

Minister of State for Provincial Affairs and Devolution for Harare
- Incumbent
- Assumed office 12 September 2023
- President: Emmerson Mnangagwa
- Preceded by: Oliver Chidawu

Senator for Harare
- Incumbent
- Assumed office 4 September 2023
- President: Emmerson Mnangagwa
- In office 22 August 2013 – 29 July 2018
- President: Robert Mugabe; Emmerson Mnangagwa

Personal details
- Party: ZANU-PF

Charles Zvidzayi Tawengwa is a Zimbabwean politician. He is the current Provincial Affairs Minister and a member of parliament for Harare. He is a member of ZANU–PF.
