= Minister of State for National Security =

Minister of State for National Security in the Office of the President and Cabinet
Ministry of State overview
- Minister responsible: Lovemore Matuke, Minister of State for National Security in the Office of the President and Cabinet
- Child Ministry of State: CIO

The Minister of State for National Security in the Office of the President and Cabinet is a non-cabinet ministerial position in the government of Zimbabwe. Notable ministers have included Didymus Mutasa, Nicholas Goche, and Emmerson Mnangagwa. The minister oversaw the Central Intelligence Organisation (CIO), although it has been argued that it is the CIO that controls the ministry since they say the Minister is a political appointee.

The ministry was merged with the Ministry of Defence on 30 November 2017 to become the Ministry of Defence, Security and War Veterans. In November 2024, President Emmerson Mnangagwa reestablished the ministry, appointing Lovemore Matuke to lead it.

== List of ministers ==
- Emmerson Mnangagwa (1980–1988) as Minister of State for National Security in the President's Office
- unknown
- Nicholas Goche (2000–2005) as Minister of State for National Security
- Didymus Mutasa (2005–2009) as Minister of State for National Security, Lands, Land Reform and Resettlement in the President's Office
- Sydney Sekeramayi (2009–2013) as Minister of State for National Security in the President's Office
- Kembo Mohadi (2015–2017) as Minister of State for National Security in the President's Office
- Owen Ncube (2018–2022)
- Lovemore Matuke (2024–present)
