= Ministry of National Housing and Social Amenities (Zimbabwe) =

Government ministry of Zimbabwe

Ministry overview
- Formed: 8 November 2019; 6 years ago
- Preceding Ministry: Local Government, Public Works and National Housing
- Jurisdiction: Government of Zimbabwe
- Headquarters: 1st—4th Floor, ZIMRE Centre, Corner Leopold Takawira and Kwame Nkrumah Avenue, Harare; 17.829058999495924°S 31.044820010793533°E
- Minister responsible: Soda Zhemu, Minister of National Housing and Social Amenities
- Deputy Minister responsible: Musa Ncube, Deputy Minister of National Housing and Social Amenities
- Ministry executive: Theodius Chinyanga, Permanent Secretary
- Website: nationalhousing.gov.zw

The Ministry of National Housing and Social Amenities is a government ministry, responsible for housing and community infrastructure in Zimbabwe. The incumbent is Soda Zhemu.
