= Ministry of Veterans of the Liberation Struggle Affairs =

Government ministry of Zimbabwe

Agency overview
- Formed: 12 September 2023; 2 years ago
- Preceding agency: Defence and War Veterans
- Type: Ministry
- Jurisdiction: Government of Zimbabwe
- Minister responsible: Monicah Mavhunga, Ministry of Veterans of Liberation
- Deputy Minister responsible: Headman Moyo, Deputy Ministry of Veterans of Liberation
- Agency executive: Albert Tagiwa Chikondo, Permanent Secretary

The Ministry of Veterans of the Liberation Struggle Affairs is a department in the Government of Zimbabwe that is responsible for the affairs of veterans of the Zimbabwean War of Independence. The Ministry was created in September 2023, having been broken away from the Defence and War Veterans. The incumbent minister is Monicah Mavhunga, who was appointed in March 2024.
