= Ministry of Energy and Power Development =

Government ministry of Zimbabwe

Agency overview
- Jurisdiction: Government of Zimbabwe
- Headquarters: John Boyne Building, Corner Inez Terrace and Speke Avenue; 17.831564235960567°S 31.04773176662855°E
- Minister responsible: July Moyo, Minister of Energy and Power Development
- Deputy Minister responsible: Yeukai Simbanegavi, Deputy Minister of Energy and Power Development
- Child agencies: Zimbabwe Electricity Supply Authority; Zimbabwe Energy Regulatory Authority
- Website: www.energy.gov.zw

The Ministry of Energy and Power Development is a government ministry, responsible for energy and electricity in Zimbabwe. The minister is July Moyo. It oversees:

- Zimbabwe Electricity Supply Authority
- Zimbabwe Energy Regulatory Authority
