= Ministry of Information, Publicity and Broadcasting Services (Zimbabwe) =

Government ministry of Zimbabwe

Ministry overview
- Jurisdiction: Government of Zimbabwe
- Headquarters: 1st Floor Bank Chambers Building, 76 Samora Machel Avenue, Harare; 17.826386045513974°S 31.048797912007554°E
- Minister responsible: Jenfan Muswere, Minister of Information, Publicity and Broadcasting Services
- Deputy Minister responsible: Omphile Marupi, Deputy Minister of Information, Publicity and Broadcasting Services
- Ministry executive: Nick Mangwana, Permanent Secretary
- Child agencies: Zimbabwe Broadcasting Corporation; Zimpapers
- Website: infomin.org.zw

The Ministry of Information and Publicity is a government ministry, responsible for media in Zimbabwe and government public relations. The incumbent minister is Jenfan Muswere. It oversees:

- Zimbabwe Broadcasting Corporation
- Zimpapers
