= Ministry of Mines and Mining Development (Zimbabwe) =

Government ministry of Zimbabwe

Ministry overview
- Jurisdiction: Government of Zimbabwe
- Headquarters: 7th Floor, Zimre Centre, Corner Leopold Takawira St and Khwame Nkrumah Ave, Harare; 17.8290402186459°S 31.04482186386103°E
- Minister responsible: Polite Kambamura, Minister of Mines and Mining Development
- Deputy Ministers responsible: Fred Moyo, Deputy Minister of Mines and Mining Development; Caleb Makwiranzou, Deputy Minister of Mines and Mining Development responsible for Oil and Gas Research including other Strategic Minerals Exploration
- Ministry executive: Thomas Utete Wushe, Permanent Secretary
- Website: mines.gov.zw

The Ministry of Mines and Mining Development is the government ministry responsible for mines and mining in Zimbabwe. The incumbent minister is Polite Kambamura. It oversees:

- Zimbabwe Geological Survey
- Zimbabwe Government Mining Engineer
- Minerals Marketing Corporation of Zimbabwe
