= Lovemore Matuke =

Zimbabwean politician

The Honourable Lovemore Matuke Sen.

Minister of State for National Security in the Office of the President and Cabinet
- Incumbent
- Assumed office 19 November 2024
- President: Emmerson Mnangagwa
- Preceded by: Owen Ncube

Minister of State for Presidential Affairs in the Office of the President and Cabinet
- In office 12 September 2023 – 19 November 2024
- President: Emmerson Mnangagwa

Senator for Masvingo
- Incumbent
- Assumed office 26 August 2018
- President: Robert Mugabe; Emmerson Mnangagwa

Personal details
- Born: 6 February 1963 (age 63) Gutu Mission Hospital, Gutu
- Party: ZANU–PF
- Education: Mushayavanhu High

Lovemore Matuke is a Zimbabwean politician. He is the current Minister of State Security and past Minister of State for Presidential Affairs in the Office of the President and Cabinet of Zimbabwe and a member of parliament.
