= Ministry of Public Service, Labour and Social Welfare =

Government ministry of Zimbabwe

Ministry overview
- Jurisdiction: Government of Zimbabwe
- Headquarters: 9th Floor Kaguvi Building, Corner 4th Street & Central Avenue, Harare; 17.823655495939843°S 31.053966595069102°E
- Minister responsible: Edgar Moyo, Minister of Public Service, Labour and Social Welfare
- Deputy Minister responsible: Mercy Dinha, Deputy Minister of Public Service, Labour and Social Welfare
- Ministry executive: Pfungwa Kunaka, Permanent Secretary
- Website: mpslsw.gov.zw

The Ministry of Public Service, Labour and Social Welfare is a government ministry, responsible for labour relations and welfare in Zimbabwe. It oversees National Social Security Authority.

== Overview ==
The Ministry of Labour and Social Services (MoLSS) is the arm of government with statutory responsibility for the protection of vulnerable populations in Zimbabwe. It has two main Departments namely, the Department of Labour and the Department Social Services, which both consist of several divisions.

The Department of Labour deals with Labour related issues through its divisions which are the labour relations division, labour research & economics division, international relations division, registration process division and the national employment services division. The Department of Social Services (DSS), which is the main focal point of the assignment, is responsible for finance and administration, rehabilitation, family and child welfare, and policy and programming. DSS, like many other government departments, was enormously affected by the economic decline, caused by the high Inflation rate which had peaked to 231 million per cent, characterized by high prices and unemployment which left 1.5 million households in poverty, homes to some 3.5 million children. As economic growth declined in Zimbabwe, so did the labour absorptive capacity of the economy such that by 2004, four out of every five jobs in Zimbabwe were informalised, resulting in massive decent work deficits. Unemployment rates had remained below 10 per cent between 1982 and 2004. However, during the same period there was a decline in formal employment (from 1.1 million in 1993 to 990,000 in 2002), and a corresponding increase in informal employment. The high unemployment rate led to a lack of professional expertise in different organisations following the exodus of qualified social workers as well as other professionals in search of greener pastures in neighbouring countries and abroad. Over 70% people migrating to South Africa, had an economic purpose for migrating.

== Ministry of Public Service ==
The Ministry of Public Service was a government ministry, responsible for parastatals (state-owned enterprises) in Zimbabwe. Among other agencies, it oversaw the Zimbabwean Public Service Commission and the National Social Security Authority (NSSA).

Around 2014 the Ministry of Public Service was merged with the Ministry of Labour and Social Welfare (aka Ministry of Labour, Manpower Planning, and Social Welfare), creating the new Ministry of Public Service, Labour and Social Welfare.

=== Ministerial staff ===
In 2009, the incumbent minister was Elphas Mukonoweshuro and the deputy minister was Andrew Langa.

== See also ==
- Economy of Zimbabwe
