= Ministry of Local Government and Public Works (Zimbabwe) =

Government ministry of Zimbabwe

Ministry overview
- Preceding Ministry: Local Government, Public Works, and National Housing
- Jurisdiction: Government of Zimbabwe
- Headquarters: Makombe Building, Corner Leopold Takawira Street & Herbert Chitepo Avenue, Harare; 17.824467465703115°S 31.041465666694084°E
- Minister responsible: Daniel Garwe, Minister of Local Government and Public Works
- Deputy Ministers responsible: Benjamin Kabikira, Deputy Minister of Local Government and Public Works; Albert Mavunga, Deputy Minister of Local Government and Public Works responsible for Local Authorities and Traditional Leadership
- Ministry executive: Dr Addmore Pazvakavambwa, Permanent Secretary
- Website: mlg.gov.zw

The Ministry of Local Government and Public Works is a government ministry, responsible for local government in Zimbabwe. It was formerly known as the Ministry of Local Government, Rural and Urban Development, and the Ministry of Local Government, Public Works, and National Housing. The incumbent minister is Daniel Garwe and the deputy ministers are Benjamin Kabikira. and Albert Mavunga. It oversees:

- Municipalities of Zimbabwe
- Districts of Zimbabwe
- Provinces of Zimbabwe
