= President of Zimbabwe =

Head of state and government

President of the Republic of Zimbabwe
(in other official languages)
Northern Ndebele	UMongameli laseZimbabwe
Shona	Mutungamiriri weNyika ye Zimbabwe
- Seal of the Order of Zimbabwe, which is worn on a chain by the President

- Presidential Standard

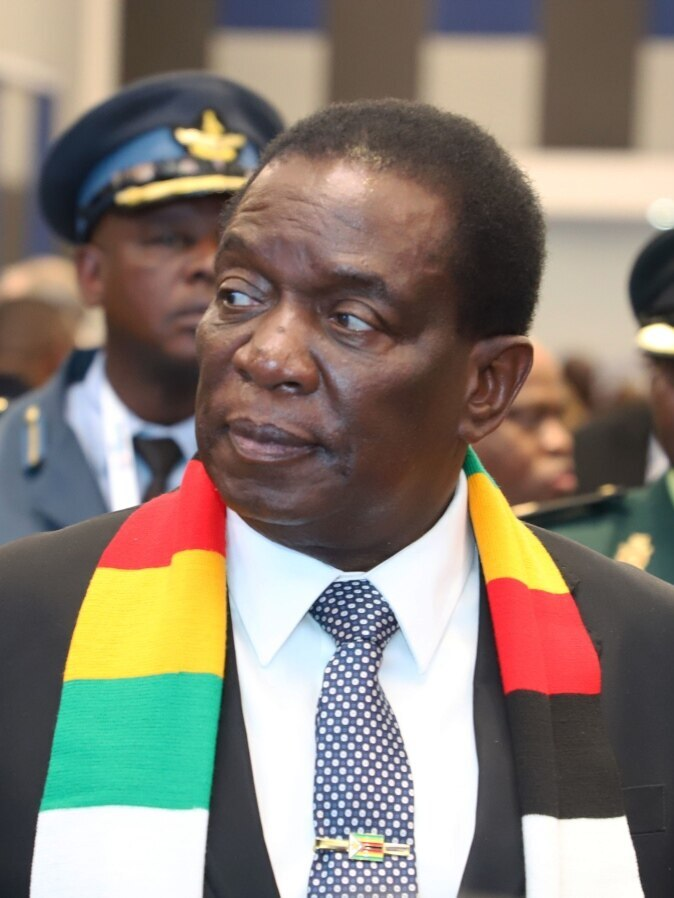
- Incumbent; Emmerson Mnangagwa since 24 November 2017
- Office of the President and Cabinet
- Style: His Excellency (diplomatic); Comrade President (informal)
- Type: Head of state; Head of government; Commander-in-chief
- Member of: Cabinet
- Residence: State House
- Appointer: Joint sitting of Parliament
- Term length: Seven years, renewable once
- Constituting instrument: Constitution of Zimbabwe (2013)
- Precursor: President of Zimbabwe Rhodesia
- Inaugural holder: Canaan Banana
- Formation: 18 April 1980 (46 years ago)
- Deputy: Vice-President of Zimbabwe
- Salary: Undisclosed
- Website: www.theopc.gov.zw

The President of Zimbabwe is the head of state and head of government of Zimbabwe. The president chairs the Cabinet and is the commander-in-chief of the Zimbabwe Defence Forces. The office combines both executive and symbolic functions. The incumbent president is Emmerson Mnangagwa, who has held the office since 24 November 2017.

== History of the office ==
=== 1980–1987: Ceremonial presidency ===
Following independence in 1980, Zimbabwe adopted the Lancaster House Constitution, which established a parliamentary system. The president served as head of state in a largely ceremonial role, while executive power was exercised by the Prime Minister. Canaan Banana became the first president and held the office until 1987.

=== 1987–2008: Executive presidency ===
In 1987, the Constitution was amended to create an executive presidency. The office of Prime Minister was abolished, and Robert Mugabe became the first executive president. This change significantly centralised power in the presidency. Mugabe was subsequently elected in 1990, 1996, and 2002.

=== 2008–2013: Power-sharing arrangement ===
Following the disputed 2008 general election, a power-sharing agreement was reached in 2009. The office of Prime Minister was restored, with Morgan Tsvangirai serving as Prime Minister alongside President Mugabe until the adoption of the 2013 Constitution.

=== 2013–present ===
The 2013 constitutional referendum abolished the Prime Minister’s office and introduced a two-term limit for the president. Since the 2017 coup d'état and Mugabe's resignation, the office has been held by Emmerson Mnangagwa.

The Constitution of Zimbabwe Amendment (No. 3) Act, 2026 (assented to on 7 July 2026) made major changes to the office, extending the presidential term from five to seven years (with transitional provisions applying to the current incumbent) and replacing direct popular election with election by a joint sitting of Parliament.

== Constitutional powers and duties ==
The president exercises wide-ranging executive, ceremonial, and military powers under the 2013 Constitution (as amended). Key powers include:

- Chairing meetings of the Cabinet
- Appointing and dismissing Vice-Presidents, ministers, and deputy ministers
- Serving as commander-in-chief of the Zimbabwe Defence Forces
- Assenting to or withholding assent from Bills passed by Parliament
- Declaring a state of public emergency (subject to parliamentary ratification)
- Appointing judges, ambassadors, and heads of key state institutions
- Representing Zimbabwe internationally and accrediting diplomatic envoys

The president also holds significant powers of appointment to constitutional commissions and security institutions.

== Election ==
Until 2026, the president was elected by direct popular vote for a five-year term using a two-round system. A candidate had to secure more than 50% of the valid votes to win outright. If no candidate achieves this threshold, a runoff election was held between the two leading candidates.

Under the Constitution of Zimbabwe Amendment (No. 3) Act, 2026, the president is elected by the members of Parliament in a joint sitting of the Senate and the National Assembly, rather than by direct popular vote.

The election takes place at a joint sitting following the swearing-in of members of Parliament and the election of the Speaker of the National Assembly and the President of the Senate after every general election. A candidate must receive more than half of the valid votes cast by members of Parliament to be elected. If no candidate achieves this, a run-off ballot is held between the two candidates with the highest number of votes. The election is conducted by the Zimbabwe Electoral Commission in accordance with electoral law and parliamentary Standing Orders.

A person elected as president who was previously a Member of Parliament ceases to be an MP upon assuming office. In the event of a vacancy (due to death, resignation, removal, or incapacity), an election must be held at a joint sitting not more than thirty days after the vacancy occurs.

The next presidential election by Parliament will follow the general election due no later than 5 August 2030.

== Term limits and succession ==
The 2013 Constitution introduced a two-term limit for the president. The limit does not apply retroactively to terms served before 2013. The 2026 amendments include transitional provisions that allow the current president to continue in office until 2030 (notwithstanding the previous term-limit rules).

In the event of a vacancy in the presidency, the First Vice-President assumes office. If both the president and First Vice-President are unable to serve, the Second Vice-President assumes the presidency.A new president must then be elected by a joint sitting of Parliament within thirty days.

== Criticism and controversies ==
The presidency has been criticised for concentrating excessive executive power, particularly during the long tenure of Robert Mugabe. Critics have pointed to the extensive powers of appointment, limited parliamentary oversight, and the use of state institutions to maintain political dominance.

The Constitution of Zimbabwe Amendment (No. 3) Act, 2026 has attracted significant criticism. Opponents argue that extending terms to seven years and shifting to parliamentary election of the president weakens democratic accountability and allows the incumbent to circumvent term limits. Legal challenges were filed questioning the procedural validity of the amendments and the lack of a referendum, although some were struck off the roll. Supporters maintain that the changes promote policy stability aligned with Vision 2030.

== List of officeholders ==
No.	Portrait	President	Took office	Left office	Time in office	Party	Election
1	Canaan Banana	Canaan Banana (1936–2003)	18 April 1980	31 December 1987	7 years, 257 days	ZANU	1980 (indirect); 1986 (indirect)
2	Robert Mugabe	Robert Mugabe (1924–2019)	31 December 1987	21 November 2017	29 years, 325 days	ZANU–PF	1987 (indirect); 1990; 1996; 2002; 2008
–	Phelekezela Mphoko	Phelekezela Mphoko (1940–2024); Acting	21 November 2017	24 November 2017	3 days	ZANU–PF	–
3	Emmerson Mnangagwa	Emmerson Mnangagwa (born 1942)	24 November 2017	Incumbent	8 years, 314 days	ZANU–PF	2018; 2023

Phelekezela Mphoko was the second (and only sitting) vice-president at the time of Mugabe's resignation on 21 November 2017. Mphoko may have been acting president of Zimbabwe for three days until Mnangagwa's accession to the presidency. However, as Mphoko was not in the country at the time, and due to the unusual circumstances, any official standing on this is unclear and may never be known.

== Rank by time in office ==
Rank	President	Time in office
1	Robert Mugabe	29 years, 325 days
2	Emmerson Mnangagwa	8 years, 314 days
3	Canaan Banana	7 years, 257 days

== See also ==
- List of heads of state of Zimbabwe
- Prime Minister of Zimbabwe
- Vice-President of Zimbabwe
- President of Rhodesia
- President of Zimbabwe Rhodesia
