= 9th Parliament of Zimbabwe =

←	8th Parliament	10th Parliament	→
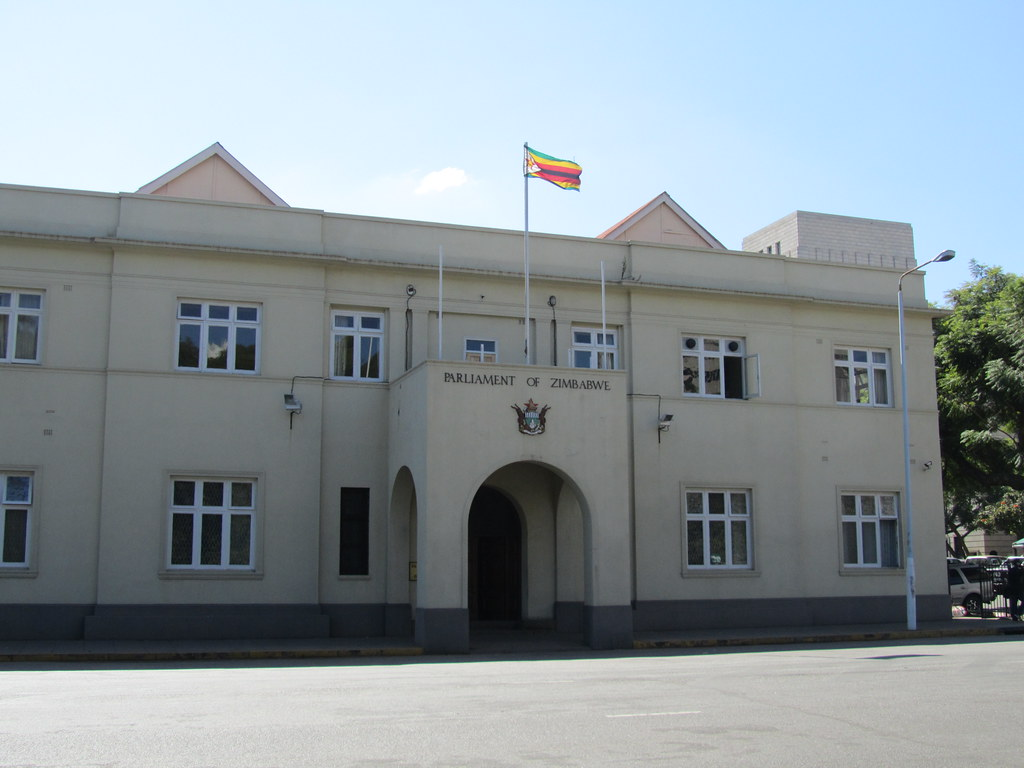
- Parliament House, Harare

Overview
- Legislative body: Parliament of Zimbabwe
- Jurisdiction: Zimbabwe
- Meeting place: Parliament House, Harare
- Term: 26 August 2018 (Note: Under the Constitution of Zimbabwe, a new term of Parliament begins on the day that the President-Elect is sworn in following a general election. Members themselves were sworn in on 5 September 2018.) – 22 August 2023
- Election: 2018 Zimbabwean general election
- Government: Second Mnangagwa Cabinet
- Website: parlzim.gov.zw

National Assembly
- Members: 270
- Speaker: Jacob Mudenda
- Deputy Speaker: Tsitsi Gezi
- Clerk: Kennedy Mugove Chokuda
- Party control: ZANU-PF

Senate
- Members: 80
- President: Mabel Chinomona
- Deputy President: Michael Reuben Nyambuya
- Clerk: Kennedy Mugove Chokuda
- Party control: None (de jure); ZANU-PF (de facto) (Note: The Chiefs typically vote in line with ZANU-PF Senators.)

Sessions
- 1st: 18 September 2018 – 26 September 2019
- 2nd: 1 October 2019 – 22 October 2020
- 3rd: 22 October 2020 – 16 September 2021
- 4th: 7 October 2021 – 22 November 2022
- 5th: 23 November 2022 – 22 August 2023

In Zimbabwe's 2018 general election, 210 members of the National Assembly were elected to the National Assembly – one for each parliamentary constituency. The Constitution of Zimbabwe provided for a further 60 female members, representing a women's quota, chosen by proportional representation based on the constituency votes.

As part of the election, a new Senate was also elected. 60 members - six for each of Zimbabwe's 10 provinces - were elected by proportional representation, 16 traditional Chiefs were elected by the Council of Chiefs, while the President and Deputy President of the Council of Chiefs are automatically Senators. The final two seats in the Senate are made up of representatives of persons with disabilities, chosen by the National Disability Board.

The Zimbabwean Parliament comprises the elected National Assembly, the Senate and the President of Zimbabwe. The list of new parliamentarians was published in an Extraordinary edition of the Zimbabwe Government Gazette on 31 August 2018.

== Overview ==
The 9th Parliament of Zimbabwe's membership was set by the 30 July 2018 election, which gave the incumbent ruling party, ZANU–PF, a two-thirds parliamentary majority, with control of both the Senate and the National Assembly. The MDC Alliance, a coalition composed of the Movement for Democratic Change – Tsvangirai and other opposition parties, won all but two of the remaining seats in the House.

Per Section 143 (1) of the Constitution of Zimbabwe, the 9th Parliament will officially begin the day the president-elect is sworn in. Per Section 145 (1) of the Constitution, the president advises as to the date of the official opening of Parliament, and Section 145 (2) stipulates that the date will be officially set by the Clerk of Parliament. The official opening of Parliament must not be held more than 30 days after the presidential inauguration. The inauguration, initially scheduled for 12 August 2018, had to be postponed indefinitely after the MDC Alliance filed a petition with the Constitutional Court challenging the presidential election results. The Parliament cannot open until after the court announces its decision and the president is inaugurated.

The 9th Parliament was rocked by political in-fighting between the various factions of the MDC. Members were recalled at various points and replaced by rival MDC candidates (see below for more detail). In the midst of this, by-elections were suspended during the COVID-19 pandemic to curb the spread of the virus and protect public health, beginning with an announcement by the Zimbabwe Electoral Commission (ZEC) on 25 March 2020 that indefinitely halted all electoral activities, including pending by-elections, following President Emmerson Mnangagwa's declaration of COVID-19 as a national disaster under the Civil Protection Act. This initial measure was supported by the Public Health (COVID-19 Prevention, Containment and Treatment) (National Lockdown) Order, 2020 (Statutory Instrument 83 of 2020), which banned gatherings exceeding 50 people, and was later formalized on 30 September 2020 through Statutory Instrument 225A of 2020, issued by Vice President Constantino Chiwenga as Minister of Health and Child Care under the Public Health Act [CAP. 15:17], amending regulations to explicitly suspend by-elections while COVID-19 remained classified as a formidable epidemic disease. The suspension, which lasted until its lifting in January 2022 to allow by-elections to resume on 26 March 2022, faced criticism from legal experts, opposition parties, and civil society for allegedly violating constitutional provisions under sections 67 (political rights including regular elections) and 158 (timing of elections, requiring by-elections within 90 days of vacancies), with arguments that it lacked explicit legal authority and disproportionately infringed on democratic rights despite public health justifications.

=== Sessions ===
President Emmerson Mnangagwa opened the first session of the 9th Parliament on 18 September 2018. The second session was opened by the president on 1 October 2019. The second session closed on 22 October 2020, and the third session opened the same day just before midday. The third session adjourned on 16 September 2021, and officially ended just before midday on 7 October 2021. The fourth session of parliament opened that afternoon, marked by President Mnangagwa's State of the Nation address. The fifth session opened on 23 November 2022, an event that marked the first legislative sitting in Zimbabwe's new parliament building in Mount Hampden. The Parliament was dissolved at midnight on 22 August 2023, ahead of the 2023 Zimbabwean general election.

== National Assembly ==
=== Composition of the National Assembly ===
The National Assembly was made up of 270 members, as well as the presiding officer, known as the Speaker, who is elected at the Assembly's first sitting. A Member of the National Assembly who is elected as Speaker ceases to be a Member of the National Assembly, and the vacant seat must be filled in accordance with the Electoral Law.

The Parliamentary election results were marked by miscalculations, errors in spreadsheet tabulation, as well as a legal dispute between results announced and votes counted. The most notable dispute was that of the constituency of Chegutu West, where 121 votes from one ward were misallocated, leaving the MDC-A candidate, Gift Konjana with 10,828 votes to ZANU-PF candidate Dexter Nduna's 10,932. When the error was noticed, ZEC claimed that they had already announced ZANU-PF as the winner, and the result could only be reversed with an order of an Electoral Court. The matter ended up in court as Gift Machoka Konjana v Dexter Nduna, though ultimately ZANU-PF's Nduna took the seat in Parliament, in spite of losing the election to Konjana.

Members
	Elected in July 2018			At dissolution in August 2023			
Constituency Maps							
Assembly composition							
Party	Common	Women	Total	Common	Women	Total	Change
ZANU–PF	145	35	180	147	35	182	▲2
Movement for Democratic Change Alliance	63	24	87	43	15	58	▼29
MDC–T	0	1	1	0	10	10	▲9
National Patriotic Front	1	0	1	0	0	0	▼1
Independent	1	0	1	1	0	1	Steady
CCC	—N/a	—N/a	—N/a	19	0	19	▲19
Total	210	60	270	210	60	270	Steady
Vacant	0	0	0	0	0	0	Steady
Speaker	1			1			Steady
Government majority	90			94			▲4

=== Elected Constituency Members ===
210 members of the National Assembly are elected by secret ballot from the 210 constituencies into which Zimbabwe is divided. The following members were gazetted as having won seats during the General Election in July 2018.

Constituency	Party of incumbent at previous election	Member returned	Party of incumbent after election	Notes
Bulawayo Province
Bulawayo Central	MDC-T	Nicola Jane Watson	MDC Alliance	Represented the Women's Quota in the previous Parliament (as MDC-T)
Bulawayo East	MDC-T	Ilos Nyoni	MDC Alliance	
Bulawayo South	MDC-T	Rajeshkumar Indukant Modi	ZANU-PF	
Emakhandeni–Entumbane	MDC-T	Dingilizwe Tshuma	MDC Alliance	Reelected (previously MDC-T)
Lobengula	MDC-T	Gift Banda	MDC Alliance	
Luveve	MDC-T	Stella Ndlovu	MDC Alliance	
Magwegwe	MDC-T	Anele Ndebele	MDC Alliance	Reelected (previously MDC-T)
Makokoba	MDC-T	James Sithole	MDC Alliance	
Nketa	MDC-T	Phelela Masuku	MDC Alliance	Reelected (previously MDC-T)
Nkulumane	MDC-T	Kucaca Ivumile Phulu	MDC Alliance	Recalled 17 March 2021.
Pelandaba–Mpopoma	MDC-T	Charles Moyo	MDC Alliance	
Pumula	MDC-T	Sichelesile Mahlangu	MDC Alliance	Recalled 17 March 2021.
Harare Province
Budiriro	MDC-T	Costa Machingauta	MDC Alliance	Reelected (previously MDC-T)
Chitungwiza North	MDC-T	Godfrey Karakadzayi Sithole	MDC Alliance	Reelected (previously MDC-T)
Chitungwiza South	ZANU-PF	Maxwell Mavhunga	MDC Alliance	
Dzivarasekwa	MDC-T	Edwin Mushoriwa	MDC Alliance	
Epworth	ZANU-PF	Earthrage Kureva	MDC Alliance	Recalled 30 September 2020.
Glen Norah	MDC-T	Wellington Chikombo	MDC Alliance	Recalled 30 September 2020.
Glen View North	MDC-T	Kennedy Dinar	MDC Alliance	Died 5 November 2020.
Glen View South	MDC-T	Vimbayi Tsvangirai Jara	MDC Alliance	Died 10 June 2019.
Harare Central	MDC-T	Murisi Zwizwai	MDC Alliance	Reelected (previously MDC-T). Recalled 23 June 2020.
Harare East	MDC-T	Tendai Laxton Biti	MDC Alliance	Reelected (previously MDC-T). Recalled 17 March 2021.
Harare North	ZANU-PF	Allan Norman Markham	MDC Alliance	
Harare South	ZANU-PF	Tongai Mafidi Mnangagwa	ZANU-PF	
Harare West	MDC-T	Joanah Mamombe	MDC Alliance	
Hatfield	MDC-T	Tapiwa Mashakada	MDC Alliance	Reelected (previously MDC-T)
Highfield East	MDC-T	Erick Murai	MDC Alliance	Reelected (previously MDC-T). Recalled 30 September 2020.
Highfield West	MDC-T	Happymore Chidziva	MDC Alliance	Recalled 23 June 2020.
Kambuzuma	MDC-T	Willias Madzimure	MDC Alliance	Reelected (previously MDC-T). Recalled 17 March 2021.
Kuwadzana	MDC-T	Miriam Mushayi	MDC Alliance	Died 7 September 2020.
Kuwadzana East	MDC-T	Chalton Hwende	MDC Alliance	Recalled 5 May 2020.
Mabvuku-Tafara	MDC-T	James Chidakwa	MDC Alliance	
Mbare	ZANU-PF	Starman Chamisa	MDC Alliance	
Mount Pleasant	ZANU-PF	Samuel Banda	MDC Alliance	
Mufakose	MDC-T	Susan Matsunga	MDC Alliance	Recalled 30 September 2020.
Southerton	MDC-T	Peter Moyo	MDC Alliance	
St Mary's	MDC-T	Unganai Dickson Tarusenga	MDC Alliance	Reelected. Recalled 30 September 2020.
Sunningdale	MDC-T	Winnie Kankuni	MDC Alliance	
Warren Park	MDC-T	Shakespear Hamauswa	MDC Alliance	
Zengeza East	MDC-T	Goodrich Chimbaira	MDC Alliance	
Zengeza West	MDC-T	Job Sikhala	MDC Alliance	
Manicaland Province
Buhera Central	ZANU-PF	Mathew Nyashanu	ZANU-PF	
Buhera North	ZANU-PF	William Mutomba	ZANU-PF	Reelected
Buhera South	ZANU-PF	Joseph Chinotimba	ZANU-PF	Reelected
Buhera West	ZANU-PF	Soul Dzuma	ZANU-PF	
Chimanimani East	ZANU-PF	Joshua Kurt Sacco	ZANU-PF	
Chimanimani West	ZANU-PF	Nokuthula Matsikenyere	ZANU-PF	
Chipinge Central	ZANU-PF	Raymore Machingura	ZANU-PF	Reelected
Chipinge East	ZANU-PF	Mathias Matewu Mlambo	MDC Alliance	
Chipinge South	ZANU-PF	Enock Porusingazi	ZANU-PF	Reelected
Chipinge West	ZANU-PF	Sibonile Nyamudeza	MDC Alliance	
Dangamvura–Chikanga	MDC-T	Chapfiwa Prosper Mutseyami	MDC Alliance	Recalled 5 May 2020.
Headlands	ZANU-PF	Christopher Peter Chingosho	ZANU-PF	
Makoni Central	ZANU-PF	David Tekeshe	MDC Alliance	
Makoni North	ZANU-PF	James Munetsi	ZANU-PF	
Makoni South	ZANU-PF	Dudzai Misheck Mataranyika	ZANU-PF	
Makoni West	ZANU-PF	Jenfan Muswere	ZANU-PF	
Musikavanhu	MDC-T	Joshua Murire	ZANU-PF	
Mutare Central	MDC-T	Innocent Tinashe Gonese	MDC Alliance	Reelected (previously MDC-T)
Mutare North	ZANU-PF	Michael Madiro	ZANU-PF	
Mutare South	ZANU-PF	Jefry Ngome	ZANU-PF	
Mutare West	ZANU-PF	Perry Teedzai Muchimwe	ZANU-PF	
Mutasa Central	MDC-T	Trevor Jones Lovelace Saruwaka	MDC Alliance	Reelected (previously MDC-T)
Mutasa North	ZANU-PF	Chido Madiwa	ZANU-PF	
Mutasa South	ZANU-PF	Regai Tsunga	MDC Alliance	Recalled 17 March 2021.
Nyanga North	ZANU-PF	Chido Sanyatwe	ZANU-PF	
Nyanga South	ZANU-PF	Supa Collins Mandiwanzira	ZANU-PF	Reelected
Mashonaland Central Province
Bindura North	ZANU-PF	Kenneth Shupikai Musanhi	ZANU-PF	Reelected
Bindura South	ZANU-PF	Toendepi Remigious Matangira	ZANU-PF	Reelected
Guruve North	ZANU-PF	Girovah Dzepasi	ZANU-PF	
Guruve South	ZANU-PF	Patrick Dutiro	ZANU-PF	
Mazowe Central	ZANU-PF	Sydney Chidamba	ZANU-PF	
Mazowe North	ZANU-PF	Campion Takura Mugweni	ZANU-PF	
Mazowe South	ZANU-PF	Fortune Chasi	ZANU-PF	Reelected
Mazowe West	ZANU-PF	Kazembe Kazembe	ZANU-PF	Reelected
Mbire	ZANU-PF	Douglas Karoro	ZANU-PF	
Mount Darwin East	ZANU-PF	Norman Marikisi	ZANU-PF	
Mount Darwin North	ZANU-PF	Noveti Muponora	ZANU-PF	Reelected
Mount Darwin South	ZANU-PF	Stephen Kabozo	ZANU-PF	
Mount Darwin West	ZANU-PF	Bannwell Seremwe	ZANU-PF	
Muzarabani North	ZANU-PF	Soda Zhemu	ZANU-PF	
Muzarabani South	ZANU-PF	Saizi Tapera	ZANU-PF	
Rushinga	ZANU-PF	Tendai Nyabani	ZANU-PF	
Shamva North	ZANU-PF	Oscar Gorerino	ZANU-PF	
Shamva South	ZANU-PF	Bramwell Bushu	ZANU-PF	
Mashonaland East Province
Chikomba Central	ZANU-PF	Felix Tapiwa Mhona	ZANU-PF	Reelected
Chikomba East	ZANU-PF	Irene Nzenza Kanhutu	ZANU-PF	
Chikomba West	ZANU-PF	John Chamunorwa Mangwiro	ZANU-PF	
Goromonzi North	ZANU-PF	Ozias Bvute	ZANU-PF	
Goromonzi South	ZANU-PF	Rueben Chikudo	MDC Alliance	
Goromonzi West	ZANU-PF	Energy Mutodi	ZANU-PF	
Maramba Pfungwe	ZANU-PF	Tichawona Makuwi Karumazondo	ZANU-PF	
Marondera Central	ZANU-PF	Caston Matewu	MDC Alliance	Recalled 30 September 2020.
Marondera East	ZANU-PF	Patrick Chidakwa	ZANU-PF	Died 11 September 2020.
Marondera West	ZANU-PF	Spiwe Elizabeth I Mukunyaidze	ZANU-PF	
Mudzi North	ZANU-PF	Newton Kachepa	ZANU-PF	Reelected
Mudzi South	Independent	Jonathan Tawonana Samukange	ZANU-PF	Reelected (previously Independent)
Mudzi West	ZANU-PF	Magna Mudyiwa	ZANU-PF	
Murewa North	ZANU-PF	Daniel Garwe	ZANU-PF	
Murewa South	ZANU-PF	Joel Biggie Matiza	ZANU-PF	Reelected. Died 22 January 2021.
Murewa West	ZANU-PF	Jonah Nyikadzino Sewera	ZANU-PF	
Mutoko East	ZANU-PF	Richard Musiyiwa	ZANU-PF	
Mutoko North	ZANU-PF	Mabel Memory Chinomona	ZANU-PF	Reelected. Elected President of the Senate on 11 September 2018; seat automatically vacated upon election.
Mutoko South	ZANU-PF	Hebert Shumbamhini	ZANU-PF	
Seke	ZANU-PF	Munyaradzi Tobias Kashambe	ZANU-PF	
Uzumba	ZANU-PF	Simbaneuta Mudarikwa	ZANU-PF	Reelected
Wedza North	ZANU-PF	David Musabayana	ZANU-PF	
Wedza South	ZANU-PF	Tinoda Machakaire	ZANU-PF	
Mashonaland West Province
Chakari	ZANU-PF	Andrew Nkani	ZANU-PF	
Chegutu East	ZANU-PF	Webster Kotiwani Shamu	ZANU-PF	Reelected
Chegutu West	ZANU-PF	Dexter Nduna	ZANU-PF (Note: Although MDC-A officially won the vote count, due to a miscalculation on the day ZANU-PF was declared the winner, and the ZANU-PF member eventually took the seat in Parliament. The case was heard in court as Gift Machoka Konjana v Dexter Nduna.)	
Chinhoyi	MDC-T	Peter Mataruse	MDC Alliance	Reelected (previously MDC-T)
Hurungwe Central	ZANU-PF	Doubt Ndiweni	ZANU-PF	
Hurungwe East	ZANU-PF	Ngoni Masenda	ZANU-PF	
Hurungwe North	ZANU-PF	Musavaya Ability Gandawa	ZANU-PF	
Hurungwe West	ZANU-PF	Mary Mliswa	ZANU-PF	
Kadoma Central	ZANU-PF	Muchineripi Chinyanganya	MDC Alliance	
Kariba	ZANU-PF	John Roland Houghton	MDC Alliance	
Magunje	ZANU-PF	Cecil Kashiri	ZANU-PF	
Makonde	ZANU-PF	Kindness Paradza	ZANU-PF	Reelected
Mhangura	ZANU-PF	Chinhamo Precious Masango	ZANU-PF	
Mhondoro-Mubaira	ZANU-PF	Freddy Kapuya	ZANU-PF	
Mhondoro-Ngezi	ZANU-PF	Tavengwa Mukuhlani	ZANU-PF	
Muzvezve	ZANU-PF	Vangelis Peter Haritatos	ZANU-PF	
Norton	ZANU-PF	Temba Peter Mliswa	Independent	
Sanyati	ZANU-PF	Polite Kambamura	ZANU-PF	
Zvimba East	ZANU-PF	Tawanda Tungamirayi	ZANU-PF	
Zvimba North	ZANU-PF	Marian Chombo	ZANU-PF	
Zvimba South	ZANU-PF	Philip Chiyangwa	ZANU-PF	
Zvimba West	ZANU-PF	Ziyambi Ziyambi	ZANU-PF	Reelected
Masvingo Province
Bikita East	ZANU-PF	Johnson Madhuku	ZANU-PF	
Bikita South	ZANU-PF	Josiah Sithole	ZANU-PF	
Bikita West	ZANU-PF	Elia Musakwa	ZANU-PF	
Chiredzi East	ZANU-PF	Denford Masiya	ZANU-PF	Reelected
Chiredzi North	ZANU-PF	Royi Bhila	ZANU-PF	
Chiredzi South	ZANU-PF	Kalisto Killion Gwanetsa	ZANU-PF	Reelected
Chiredzi West	ZANU-PF	Dumo Augustine Musikavanhu	ZANU-PF	
Chivi Central	ZANU-PF	Ephraim Gwanongodza	ZANU-PF	Reelected
Chivi North	ZANU-PF	Mathias Tongofa	ZANU-PF	Reelected
Chivi South	ZANU-PF	Killer Zivhu	ZANU-PF	Recalled 10 June 2020.
Gutu Central	ZANU-PF	Winston Chitando	ZANU-PF	
Gutu East	ZANU-PF	Berta Chikwama	ZANU-PF	Reelected
Gutu North	ZANU-PF	Yeukai Simbanegavi	ZANU-PF	
Gutu South	ZANU-PF	Pupurai Togarepi	ZANU-PF	
Gutu West	ZANU-PF	John Paradza	ZANU-PF	
Masvingo Central	ZANU-PF	Mhere Edmond	ZANU-PF	
Masvingo North	ZANU-PF	Davis Marapira	ZANU-PF	Reelected
Masvingo South	ZANU-PF	Cladious Maronge	ZANU-PF	
Masvingo Urban	ZANU-PF	Nyokanhete Jacob	MDC Alliance	
Masvingo West	ZANU-PF	Ezra Ruvai Chadzamira	ZANU-PF	Reelected
Mwenezi East	ZANU-PF	Joosbi Omar	ZANU-PF	Died 25 October 2020.
Mwenezi West	ZANU-PF	Priscilla Moyo	ZANU-PF	
Zaka Central	ZANU-PF	Davison Svuure	ZANU-PF	
Zaka East	ZANU-PF	Kaston Ringirisai Gumbwanda	ZANU-PF	Died on 25 June 2019.
Zaka North	ZANU-PF	Robson Mavenyengwa	ZANU-PF	Reelected
Zaka West	ZANU-PF	Ophias Murambiwa	ZANU-PF	
Matabeleland North Province
Binga North	MDC-T	Prince Dubeko Sibanda	MDC Alliance	Reelected (previously MDC-T). Recalled 30 September 2020.
Binga South	MDC-T	Joel Gabuza Gabbuza	MDC Alliance	Reelected (previously MDC-T)
Bubi	ZANU-PF	Sonny Key Mguni	ZANU-PF	
Hwange Central	MDC-T	Fortune Daniel Molokela-Tsiye	MDC Alliance	
Hwange East	MDC-T	Tose Wesley Sansole	MDC Alliance	Reelected (previously MDC-T)
Hwange West	ZANU-PF	Godfrey Dube	MDC Alliance	
Lupane East	ZANU-PF	Sithembile Gumbo	ZANU-PF	Reelected. Died on 15 April 2019.
Lupane West	ZANU-PF	Martin Khumalo	ZANU-PF	Reelected
Nkayi North	ZANU-PF	Sithembiso G Nyoni	ZANU-PF	Reelected
Nkayi South	MDC-T	Stars Mathe	ZANU-PF	
Tsholotsho North	MDC-T	Sibangumuzi Sixtone Khumalo	ZANU-PF	
Tsholotsho South	ZANU-PF	Zenzo Sibanda	ZANU-PF	Reelected. Died 10 August 2021.
Umguza	ZANU-PF	Richard Moyo	ZANU-PF	
Matabeleland South Province
Beitbridge East	ZANU-PF	Albert Nguluvhe	ZANU-PF	
Beitbridge West	ZANU-PF	Ruth Mavhunga Maboyi	ZANU-PF	
Bulilima East	ZANU-PF	Nqobizitha Mangaliso Ndlovu	ZANU-PF	
Bulilima West	ZANU-PF	Dingumuzi Phuti	ZANU-PF	
Gwanda Central	ZANU-PF	Patrick Dube	MDC Alliance	
Gwanda North	ZANU-PF	Madodana Sibanda	ZANU-PF	Reelected
Gwanda South	ZANU-PF	Abedinico Ncube	ZANU-PF	Reelected
Insiza North	ZANU-PF	Farai Taruvinga	ZANU-PF	
Insiza South	ZANU-PF	Spare Sithole	ZANU-PF	
Mangwe	ZANU-PF	Obendingwa Mguni	ZANU-PF	Reelected. Died 18 June 2019.
Matobo North	ZANU-PF	Edgar Moyo	ZANU-PF	
Matobo South	ZANU-PF	Saul Ncube	ZANU-PF	Reelected
Umzingwane	ZANU-PF	Levi Mayihlome	ZANU-PF	
Midlands Province
Chirumanzu	ZANU-PF	Barbara Rwodzi	ZANU-PF	
Chirumanzu Zibagwe	ZANU-PF	Prosper Machando	ZANU-PF	Seat held by Emmerson Mnangagwa in previous Parliament
Chiwundura	ZANU-PF	Livingstone Chimina	MDC Alliance	
Gokwe Central	ZANU-PF	Victor Matemadanda	ZANU-PF	Appointed Ambassador to Mozambique in March 2021
Gokwe Chireya	ZANU-PF	Torerayi Moyo	ZANU-PF	
Gokwe Gumunyu	ZANU-PF	Steven Ngwenya	ZANU-PF	
Gokwe Kabuyuni	ZANU-PF	Leonard Chikomba	ZANU-PF	Reelected. Died on 28 May 2022.
Gokwe Kana	ZANU-PF	Owen Ncube	ZANU-PF	Reelected
Gokwe Mapfungautsi	ZANU-PF	Tawanda Karikoga	ZANU-PF	
Gokwe Nembudziya	ZANU-PF	Justice Mayor Wadyajena	ZANU-PF	Reelected
Gokwe Sengwa	ZANU-PF	Paul Mavima	ZANU-PF	Reelected
Gokwe Sasame	ZANU-PF	Gorden Chanda	ZANU-PF	
Gweru Urban	MDC-T	Brian Dube	MDC Alliance	
Kwekwe Central	ZANU-PF	Masango Matambanadzo	NPF	Reelected (previously ZANU-PF). Died 28 July 2020.
Mberengwa East	ZANU-PF	Marko Raidza	ZANU-PF	
Mberengwa North	ZANU-PF	Tafanana Zhou	ZANU-PF	Reelected
Mberengwa South	ZANU-PF	Alum Mpofu	ZANU-PF	Died 28 March 2021.
Mberengwa West	ZANU-PF	Joram Macdonald Gumbo	ZANU-PF	
Mbizo	MDC-T	Settlement Chikwinya	MDC Alliance	Reelected (previously MDC-T). Recalled 17 March 2021.
Mkoba	MDC-T	Amos Chibaya	MDC Alliance	Reelected (previously MDC-T). Recalled 23 June 2020.
Redcliff	ZANU-PF	Dzikamai Lloyd Mukapiko	MDC Alliance	
Shurugwi North	ZANU-PF	Ronald Robson Nyathi	ZANU-PF	
Shurugwi South	ZANU-PF	Edmond Mkaratigwa	ZANU-PF	
Silobela	ZANU-PF	Mtokozisi Manoki Mpofu	ZANU-PF	Reelected
Vungu	ZANU-PF	Omega Sibanda	ZANU-PF	
Zhombe	ZANU-PF	Edmore Samambwa	ZANU-PF	
Zvishavane Ngezi	ZANU-PF	Dumezweni Mawite	ZANU-PF	
Zvishavane Runde	ZANU-PF	Cuthbert Mpame	ZANU-PF	

=== Women's Quota ===
An additional 60 women members, six from each of the provinces into which Zimbabwe is divided, are elected under a party-list system of proportional representation which is based on the votes cast for candidates representing political parties in each of the provinces in the general election for constituency members in the provinces.

Province	Member	Party	Notes
Bulawayo	Thabitha Khumalo	MDC Alliance	Represented Bulawayo East in the previous Parliament Reelected (as MDC-T). Recalled 5 May 2020.
Bulawayo	Dorcas Staff Sibanda	MDC Alliance	Represented Bulawayo Central in the previous Parliament (as MDC-T). Recalled 30 September 2020.
Bulawayo	Jasmine Toffa	MDC Alliance	Reelected (previously MDC)
Bulawayo	Priscilla Misihairambwi Mushonga	MDC-T	Appointed Ambassador to Sweden on 10 September 2021
Bulawayo	Judith Mkwanda Ncube	ZANU-PF	
Bulawayo	Ophar Ncube	ZANU-PF	Died 25 February 2022.
Harare	Paurina Mpariwa	MDC Alliance	Candidate represented Mufakose in previous Parliament (as MDC-T)
Harare	Annah Myambo	MDC Alliance	Recalled 23 June 2020.
Harare	Virginia Zengeya	MDC Alliance	Recalled 23 June 2020.
Harare	Joyce Jaja	MDC Alliance	
Harare	Susan Madziwa	ZANU-PF	
Harare	Miriam Rutendo Chikukwa	ZANU-PF	Reelected
Manicaland	Lynette Karenyi	MDC Alliance	Recalled 30 September 2020.
Manicaland	Joyce Makonya	MDC Alliance	Reelected (previously MDC-T)
Manicaland	Constance Chihururu	MDC Alliance	
Manicaland	Oppah Muchinguri	ZANU-PF	Reelected
Manicaland	Esther Chikuni	ZANU-PF	Reelected
Manicaland	Lucia Chitura	ZANU-PF	Reelected
Mashonaland Central	Bacillia Majaya	MDC Alliance	Reelected (previously MDC-T). Recalled 23 June 2020.
Mashonaland Central	Elizabeth Shongedza	ZANU-PF	Reelected
Mashonaland Central	Gertrude Chibagu	ZANU-PF	Reelected
Mashonaland Central	Dorothy Mashonganyika	ZANU-PF	Reelected
Mashonaland Central	Ferescah Nhambo	ZANU-PF	
Mashonaland Central	Tsitsi Gezi	ZANU-PF	Reelected
Mashonaland East	Brightness Mangora	MDC Alliance	
Mashonaland East	Sipiwe Muchaneta Muchenje	MDC Alliance	Reelected (previously MDC-T)
Mashonaland East	Lilian Zemura	ZANU-PF	Reelected
Mashonaland East	Roseline Roseweater Makoni	ZANU-PF	Reelected
Mashonaland East	Nyarai Tsuura	ZANU-PF	
Mashonaland East	Tatenda Annastacia Maveta	ZANU-PF	
Mashonaland West	Consilia Chinanzvavana	MDC Alliance	Reelected (previously MDC-T). Recalled 30 September 2020.
Mashonaland West	Senzeni Mafuta	MDC Alliance	
Mashonaland West	Jennifer Nomsa Mhlanga	ZANU-PF	Reelected
Mashonaland West	Goodluck Kwaramba	ZANU-PF	Reelected
Mashonaland West	Josephine Shava	ZANU-PF	
Mashonaland West	Christina Nyere	ZANU-PF	Reelected
Masvingo	Machirairwa Mugidho	MDC Alliance	Recalled 23 June 2020.
Masvingo	Nyaradza Mago	MDC Alliance	
Masvingo	Annah Rungani	ZANU-PF	Reelected
Masvingo	Angeline Chipato	ZANU-PF	Reelected
Masvingo	Aliginia Samson	ZANU-PF	
Masvingo	Emma Ncube	ZANU-PF	
Matabeleland North	Sibusisiwe Bhuda	MDC Alliance	Reelected (previously MDC-T)
Matabeleland North	Mafoko Ruth Labode	MDC Alliance	Reelected (previously MDC-T)
Matabeleland North	Francisca Ncube	MDC Alliance	Recalled 23 June 2020.
Matabeleland North	Mail Nkomo	ZANU-PF	Reelected
Matabeleland North	Elizabeth Masuku	ZANU-PF	
Matabeleland North	Molly Mkandla	ZANU-PF	
Matabeleland South	Nomathemba Ndlovu	MDC Alliance	Reelected (previously MDC-T). Recalled 23 June 2020.
Matabeleland South	Lindiwe Maphosa	MDC Alliance	
Matabeleland South	Rossy Mpofu	ZANU-PF	Reelected
Matabeleland South	Alice Ndlovu	ZANU-PF	Reelected. Died on 29 November 2019
Matabeleland South	Evelyn Ndlovu	ZANU-PF	
Matabeleland South	Lisa Singo	ZANU-PF	Died 4 February 2021.
Midlands	Catherine Gozho	MDC Alliance	
Midlands	Memory Mbondiya	MDC Alliance	
Midlands	Colleta Mutambisi	ZANU-PF	
Midlands	Ellina Shirichena	ZANU-PF	
Midlands	Perseviarance Zhou	ZANU-PF	
Midlands	Vairet Nhari	ZANU-PF	

== Senate ==
=== Composition of the Senate ===
The Senate is made up of 80 members, as well as the presiding officer, known as the President of the Senate, who is elected at the Senate's first sitting. A Senator who is elected as President of the Senate ceases to be a Senator, and the vacant seat must be filled in accordance with the Electoral Law.

Senate composition			
Affiliation	Elected in 2018	At dissolution in 2023	Change
ZANU–PF	35	35	Steady
Movement for Democratic Change Alliance	24	16	▼8
MDC–T	1	9	▲8
Chiefs	18	18	Steady
Persons with disabilities	2	2	Steady
Total	80	80	Steady
Vacant	0	0	Steady
President of the Senate	1	1	Steady

=== Provincial Seats ===
There are 60 provincial seats in the Senate. Six are elected from each of the provinces into which Zimbabwe is divided, under a party-list system of proportional representation which is based on the votes cast for candidates representing political parties in each of the provinces in the general election for Members of the National Assembly. Male and female candidates are listed alternately, with every list being headed by a female candidate.

Province	Senator	Party	Notes
Bulawayo	Siphiwe Ncube	MDC Alliance	Reelected (previously MDC-T). Recalled 30 June 2020.
Bulawayo	Gideon Shoko	MDC Alliance	Recalled 30 June 2020.
Bulawayo	Helen Zivira	MDC Alliance	Recalled 30 June 2020.
Bulawayo	Mildred Reason Dube	MDC-T	Died 27 June 2022.
Bulawayo	Molly Ndlovu	ZANU-PF	
Bulawayo	Joshua Teke Malinga	ZANU-PF	
Harare	Theresa Maonei Makone	MDC Alliance	
Harare	Elias Mudzuri	MDC Alliance	
Harare	Kerina Gweshe	MDC Alliance	
Harare	Morgan Femai	MDC Alliance	
Harare	Omega Sipani Hungwe	ZANU-PF	
Harare	Oliver Chidawu	ZANU-PF	Died 19 July 2022.
Manicaland	Christine Rambanepasi	MDC Alliance	Died 3 January 2021.
Manicaland	Togarasei Douglas Mwonzora	MDC Alliance	
Manicaland	Keresencia Chabuka	MDC Alliance	Reelected (previously MDC-T). Recalled 30 June 2020.
Manicaland	Monica Mutsvangwa	ZANU-PF	Reelected
Manicaland	Michael Reuben Nyambuya	ZANU-PF	Reelected
Manicaland	Ellen Gwaradzimba	ZANU-PF	Died 15 January 2021.
Mashonaland Central	Martha Muronzi	MDC Alliance	Reelected (previously MDC-T)
Mashonaland Central	Monicah Mavhunga	ZANU-PF	Reelected
Mashonaland Central	Perrance Shiri	ZANU-PF	Died 29 July 2020.
Mashonaland Central	Angeline Kumbirai Tongogara	ZANU-PF	
Mashonaland Central	Chenhamo Chikezha Chimutengwende	ZANU-PF	Reelected
Mashonaland Central	Alice Chimbudzi	ZANU-PF	Reelected
Mashonaland East	Jane Chifamba	MDC Alliance	Reelected (previously MDC-T)
Mashonaland East	Tapfumanei Wunganayi Muzoda	MDC Alliance	Recalled 30 June 2020.
Mashonaland East	Aplonia Munzverengwi	ZANU-PF	Reelected
Mashonaland East	Sydney Tigere Sekeramayi	ZANU-PF	Reelected
Mashonaland East	Address Matiirira	ZANU-PF	Reelected
Mashonaland East	David Pagwesese Parirenyatwa	ZANU-PF	Reelected
Mashonaland West	Violet Moeketsi	MDC Alliance	Reelected (previously MDC-T)
Mashonaland West	Voice Chinake	MDC Alliance	Reelected (previously MDC-T)
Mashonaland West	Priscah Mupfumira	ZANU-PF	Reelected
Mashonaland West	Sikelela James Gumpo	ZANU-PF	
Mashonaland West	Bybit Lydia Tsomondo	ZANU-PF	
Mashonaland West	Joseph Madziva Chirongoma	ZANU-PF	
Masvingo	Esnath Rwambiwa	MDC Alliance	
Masvingo	Tichinani Matevera	MDC Alliance	
Masvingo	Ottillia Muhlava Maluleke	ZANU-PF	Reelected
Masvingo	Lovemore Matuke	ZANU-PF	
Masvingo	Clara Shumba	ZANU-PF	
Masvingo	Josaya Dunira Hungwe	ZANU-PF	Reelected
Matabeleland North	Rosemary Nyathi	MDC Alliance	Reelected (previously MDC-T)
Matabeleland North	Hebert Sinampande	MDC Alliance	Reelected (previously MDC-T). Recalled 30 June 2020.
Matabeleland North	Phyllis Ndlovu	MDC Alliance	Died 31 January 2022.
Matabeleland North	Thokozile Mathuthu	ZANU-PF	Reelected. Died on 13 August 2018 before Parliament sat.
Matabeleland North	Obert Mpofu	ZANU-PF	Resigned on 25 September 2018.
Matabeleland North	Alice Dube	ZANU-PF	
Matabeleland South	Meliwe Phuthi	MDC Alliance	Recalled 30 June 2020.
Matabeleland South	Bekithemba Mpofu	MDC Alliance	
Matabeleland South	Tambudzani Bhudagi Mohadi	ZANU-PF	Reelected
Matabeleland South	Simon Khaya Moyo	ZANU-PF	Reelected. Died 14 November 2021.
Matabeleland South	Alma Mkwebu	ZANU-PF	Reelected
Matabeleland South	Themba Mathuthu	ZANU-PF	
Midlands	Lilian Timveos	MDC Alliance	Reelected (previously MDC-T). Recalled on 5 May 2020.
Midlands	Morgan Komichi	MDC Alliance	Reelected (previously MDC-T)
Midlands	Tsitsi Veronica Muzenda	ZANU-PF	Reelected
Midlands	Sibusiso Moyo	ZANU-PF	Died 20 January 2021.
Midlands	Maybe Mbohwa	ZANU-PF	
Midlands	Lawrence David Mavima	ZANU-PF	

=== Chiefs' seats ===
Chapter 6, Part 3, §120(b) and (c) of the Constitution of Zimbabwe reserves 16 seats in the Senate for Chiefs, of whom two are elected by the provincial assembly of Chiefs from each of the provinces, other than the metropolitan provinces, and two for the President and Deputy President of the National Council of Chiefs.

Elected by Provincial Assembly of Chiefs for	Traditional Chief's Name	Name of Chief	Notes
President of the Council of Chiefs (ex officio)		Fortune Charumbira	Reelected
Deputy President of the Council of Chiefs (ex officio)		Lucas Mtshane Khumalo	Reelected
Manicaland	Makumbe	Shepherd Gundu Chengeta	
Manicaland	Mapungwana	Mapungwana Annias	
Mashonaland Central	Nembire	Clemence Nyabvunzi	Reelected
Mashonaland Central	Matsiwo	Chigwadzara Chinhenza	
Mashonaland East	Chikwaka	Witness M. Bungu	
Mashonaland East	Nechombo	Langton Chikukwa	
Mashonaland West	Ngezi	Peter Pasipamire	
Mashonaland West	Chundu	Abel Mbasera	
Masvingo	Chitanga	Felani Chauke	Reelected
Masvingo	Nhema	Ranganai Bwawanda	
Matabeleland North	Siansali	Siatabwa Nkatazo	Reelected
Matabeleland North	Mathupula	Khumalo Mandlakazulu	
Matabeleland South	Nyangazonke	Vuyani Ndiweni	Reelected
Matabeleland South	Masendu	Siandalizwe Dube	Reelected
Midlands	Ngungumbane	Zama Nthua Mkwananzi	Reelected
Midlands	Ntabeni	Milton Ntabeni	Reelected

=== Persons with disabilities ===
Chapter 6, Part 3, §120(d) of the Constitution of Zimbabwe reserves two seats in the Senate for representatives of persons with disabilities. In terms of paragraph 3(3)(b) of the Seventh Schedule to the Electoral Act [Chapter 2:13], one must be male, the other must be female. These Senators are elected by the National Disability Board.

Gender	Senator	Notes
Female	Rejoice Timire	Died 10 August 2021.
Male	Watson Khupe	Died 17 July 2022.

== By-elections, replacements and recalls ==
A series of political expulsions of elected representatives from the Movement for Democratic Change Alliance (MDC Alliance) took place between 2020 and 2022. These recalls were initiated by the rival Movement for Democratic Change – Tsvangirai (MDC-T) faction led initially by Thokozani Khupe and later by Douglas Mwonzora, following a Supreme Court ruling that invalidated Nelson Chamisa's leadership of the party. The recalls affected directly elected constituency Members of Parliament (MPs), proportional representation MPs, and senators, leading to numerous by-elections and a significant reduction in opposition strength in Parliament.

The actions were justified under Section 129(1)(k) of the Constitution of Zimbabwe, which allows for the recall of parliamentarians who cease to belong to the party under whose banner they were elected. The recalls stemmed from internal party splits and were contested in several court cases, with mixed outcomes.

The recalls began in May 2020, shortly after a landmark Supreme Court judgment on 31 March 2020 (SC 56-20), which declared Nelson Chamisa's ascension to the MDC-T presidency unconstitutional and reinstated Thokozani Khupe as acting president. This ruling empowered the Khupe/Mwonzora faction to claim authority over MPs and senators elected in the 2018 general election under the MDC Alliance banner, arguing that the Alliance was an electoral pact dominated by the MDC-T.

The primary reason for the recalls was the allegation that the affected parliamentarians had aligned themselves with Chamisa's faction, effectively ceasing membership in the MDC-T. This internal schism was exacerbated by the Supreme Court's decision, which nullified leadership changes post-2014 and triggered a wave of expulsions to "rebuild the party with authentic members."

The impacts were profound: over 20 MPs and multiple senators were recalled, creating vacancies that necessitated by-elections, which had to be delayed until 2022 due to all electoral activities being suspended in light of the COVID 19 pandemic. These by-elections resulted in gains for ZANU–PF in some seats, further eroding opposition influence in Parliament. The recalls were criticized as undermining the will of the electorate and described as a "violent onslaught on democracy." They also strained resources, leading to unnecessary expenditures on by-elections.

Several court disputes arose. In October 2021, the High Court revoked the recalls of six MPs (Kucaca Phulu, Settlement Chikwinya, Willias Madzimure, Regai Tsunga, Sichelesile Mahlangu, and Tendai Biti) and ordered their reinstatement, ruling that the recalling individual lacked authority as they belonged to a rival PDP faction. Eight recalled senators challenged their expulsion in July 2020, arguing that the Senate President unlawfully implemented the recall from the MDC-T instead of the MDC Alliance. Other challenges included a Supreme Court appeal on Senator Lilian Timveos' recall.

=== Constituency by-elections ===
Constituency	Province	Date	Party of incumbent before vacancy	Outgoing member	Reason for by-election	Party of incumbent after election	Member returned
Lupane East	MBN	3 August 2019	ZANU-PF	Sithembile Gumbo	Death of member on 15 April 2019	ZANU-PF	Mbongeni Dube
Glen View South	HRE	7 September 2019	MDC Alliance	Vimbayi Tsvangirai Jara	Death of member on 10 June 2019	MDC Alliance	Vincent Tsvangirai
Mangwe	MBS	7 September 2019	ZANU-PF	Obendingwa Mguni	Death of member on 18 June 2019	ZANU-PF	Hlanani Mguni
Zaka East	MVG	21 September 2019	ZANU-PF	Kaston Ringirisai Gumbwanda	Death of member on 25 June 2019	ZANU-PF	Clemence Chiduwa
Mutoko North	MSE	24 November 2019	ZANU-PF	Mabel Memory Chinomona	Member elected President of the Senate on 11 September 2018	ZANU-PF	Rambidzai Nyabote
Binga North	MBN	26 March 2022	MDC Alliance	Prince Dubeko Sibanda	Member recalled on 30 September 2020	CCC	Prince Dubeko Sibanda
Chivi South	MVG	26 March 2022	ZANU-PF	Killer Zivhu	Member recalled on 10 June 2020	ZANU-PF	Munyaradzi Zizhou
Dangamvura–Chikanga	MCL	26 March 2022	MDC Alliance	Chapfiwa Prosper Mutseyami	Member recalled on 5 May 2020	CCC	Chapfiwa Prosper Mutseyami
Epworth	HRE	26 March 2022	MDC Alliance	Earthrage Kureva	Member recalled on 30 September 2020	ZANU-PF	Zalerah Hazvineyi Makari
Glen Norah	HRE	26 March 2022	MDC Alliance	Wellington Chikombo	Member recalled on 30 September 2020	CCC	Wellington Chikombo
Glen View North	HRE	26 March 2022	MDC Alliance	Kennedy Dinar	Death of member on 5 November 2020	CCC	Fani Munengami
Gokwe Central	MID	26 March 2022	ZANU-PF	Victor Matemadanda	Appointment of member as Ambassador to Mozambique	ZANU-PF	Daveson Masvisvi
Harare Central	HRE	26 March 2022	MDC Alliance	Murisi Zwizwai	Member recalled on 23 June 2020	CCC	Murisi Zwizwai
Harare East	HRE	26 March 2022	MDC Alliance	Tendai Laxton Biti	Member recalled on 17 March 2021	CCC	Tendai Laxton Biti
Highfield East	HRE	26 March 2022	MDC Alliance	Erick Murai	Member recalled on 30 September 2020	CCC	Erick Murai
Highfield West	HRE	26 March 2022	MDC Alliance	Happymore Chidziva	Member recalled on 23 June 2020	CCC	Happymore Chidziva
Kambuzuma	HRE	26 March 2022	MDC Alliance	Willias Madzimure	Member recalled on 17 March 2021	CCC	Willias Madzimure
Kuwadzana	HRE	26 March 2022	MDC Alliance	Miriam Mushayi	Death of member on 7 September 2020	CCC	Johnson Matambo
Kuwadzana East	HRE	26 March 2022	MDC Alliance	Chalton Hwende	Member recalled on 5 May 2020	CCC	Chalton Hwende
Kwekwe Central	MID	26 March 2022	NPF	Masango Matambanadzo	Death of member on 28 July 2020	CCC	Judith Tobaiwa
Marondera Central	MSE	26 March 2022	MDC Alliance	Caston Matewu	Member recalled on 30 September 2020	CCC	Caston Matewu
Marondera East	MSE	26 March 2022	ZANU-PF	Patrick Chidakwa	Death of member on 11 September 2020	ZANU-PF	Jeremiah Z Chiwetu
Mberengwa South	MID	26 March 2022	ZANU-PF	Alum Mpofu	Death of member on 28 March 2021	ZANU-PF	Tasara Hungwe
Mbizo	MID	26 March 2022	MDC Alliance	Settlement Chikwinya	Member recalled on 17 March 2021	CCC	Settlement Chikwinya
Mkoba	MID	26 March 2022	MDC Alliance	Amos Chibaya	Member recalled on 23 June 2020	CCC	Amos Chibaya
Mufakose	HRE	26 March 2022	MDC Alliance	Susan Matsunga	Member recalled on 30 September 2020	CCC	Susan Matsunga
Murewa South	MSE	26 March 2022	ZANU-PF	Joel Biggie Matiza	Death of member on 22 January 2021	ZANU-PF	Nyasha Masoka
Mutasa South	MCL	26 March 2022	MDC Alliance	Regai Tsunga	Member recalled on 17 March 2021	ZANU-PF	Misheck Mugadza
Mwenezi East	MVG	26 March 2022	ZANU-PF	Joosbi Omar	Death of member on 25 October 2020	ZANU-PF	Master Makope
Nkulumane	BYO	26 March 2022	MDC Alliance	Kucaca Ivumile Phulu	Member recalled on 17 March 2021	CCC	Kucaca Ivumile Phulu
Pumula	BYO	26 March 2022	MDC Alliance	Sichelesile Mahlangu	Member recalled on 17 March 2021	CCC	Sichelesile Mahlangu
St Mary's	HRE	26 March 2022	MDC Alliance	Unganai Dickson Tarusenga	Member recalled on 30 September 2020	CCC	Unganai Dickson Tarusenga
Tsholotsho South	MBN	26 March 2022	ZANU-PF	Zenzo Sibanda	Death of member on 10 August 2021	ZANU-PF	Musa Ncube
Gokwe Kabuyuni	MID	27 August 2022	ZANU-PF	Leonard Chikomba	Death of member on 28 May 2022	ZANU-PF	Spencer Tshuma

=== Women's Quota replacements ===
Province	Replacement Date	Party of incumbent before vacancy	Outgoing member	Reason for vacancy	Party of incumbent after substitution	Member returned
MBS	31 July 2020	ZANU-PF	Alice Ndlovu	Death of member on 29 November 2019	ZANU-PF	Esther Nyathi
BYO	2 October 2020	MDC Alliance	Thabitha Khumalo	Member recalled on 5 May 2020	MDC-T	Thokozani Khupe
HRE	2 October 2020	MDC Alliance	Annah Myambo	Member recalled on 23 June 2020	MDC-T	Winfielda Yvonne Musarurwa
HRE	2 October 2020	MDC Alliance	Virginia Zengeya	Member recalled on 23 June 2020	MDC-T	Lindani Moyo
MSC	2 October 2020	MDC Alliance	Bacillia Majaya	Member recalled on 23 June 2020	MDC-T	January Sawuke
MVG	2 October 2020	MDC Alliance	Machirairwa Mugidho	Member recalled on 23 June 2020	MDC-T	Memory Munochinzwa
MBN	2 October 2020	MDC Alliance	Francisca Ncube	Member recalled on 23 June 2020	MDC-T	Lwazi Sibanda
MBS	2 October 2020	MDC Alliance	Nomathemba Ndlovu	Member recalled on 23 June 2020	MDC-T	Sipho Mokone
BYO	5 February 2021	MDC Alliance	Dorcas Staff Sibanda	Member recalled on 30 September 2020	MDC-T	Nomvula Mguni
MCL	5 February 2021	MDC Alliance	Lynette Karenyi	Member recalled on 30 September 2020	MDC-T	Judith Chimwaza
MSW	5 February 2021	MDC Alliance	Consilia Chinanzvavana	Member recalled on 30 September 2020	MDC-T	Base Miranzi
MBS	4 June 2021	ZANU-PF	Lisa Singo	Death of member on 4 February 2021	ZANU-PF	Metrine Mudau
BYO	18 February 2022	MDC-T	Priscilla Misihairambwi Mushonga	Member appointed Ambassador to Sweden on 10 September 2021	MDC-T	Moreblessing Tembo
BYO	19 July 2022	MDC Alliance	Thokozani Khupe	Member recalled on 7 February 2022	MDC Alliance	Visitor Ndebele
BYO	19 July 2022	MDC Alliance	Nomvula Mguni	Member recalled on 7 February 2022	MDC Alliance	Florence Nyika
BYO	6 January 2023	ZANU-PF	Ophar Ncube	Death of member on 25 February 2022	ZANU-PF	Eulysses Nowedza

=== Senate replacements ===
Quota	Province	Replacement Date	Representing	Outgoing member	Reason for vacancy	Representing	Member returned
Provincial	MBN	2 November 2018	ZANU-PF	Obert Mpofu	Resignation of member on 25 September 2018	ZANU-PF	Cain Mathema
Provincial	MBN	2 November 2018	ZANU-PF	Thokozile Mathuthu	Death of member on 13 August 2018	ZANU-PF	Sikhanyisiwe Mpofu
Provincial	BYO	2 October 2020	MDC Alliance	Siphiwe Ncube	Member recalled 30 June 2020	MDC-T	Dorothy Molly Ndlovu
Provincial	BYO	2 October 2020	MDC Alliance	Gideon Shoko	Member recalled 30 June 2020	MDC-T	Kalpani Phugeni
Provincial	BYO	2 October 2020	MDC Alliance	Helen Zivira	Member recalled 30 June 2020	MDC-T	Tamani Moyo
Provincial	MCL	2 October 2020	MDC Alliance	Keresencia Chabuka	Member recalled 30 June 2020	MDC-T	Getrude Moyo
Provincial	MSE	2 October 2020	MDC Alliance	Tapfumanei Wunganayi Muzoda	Member recalled 30 June 2020	MDC-T	Piniel Denga
Provincial	MBN	2 October 2020	MDC Alliance	Hebert Sinampande	Member recalled 30 June 2020	MDC-T	Chief Ndlovu
Provincial	MBS	2 October 2020	MDC Alliance	Meliwe Phuthi	Member recalled 30 June 2020	MDC-T	Nomalanga Khumalo
Provincial	MID	2 October 2020	MDC Alliance	Lilian Timveos	Member recalled 5 May 2020	MDC-T	Teti Chisorochengwe
Provincial	MSC	6 October 2020	ZANU-PF	Perrance Shiri	Death of member on 29 July 2020	ZANU-PF	Eleven Kambizi
Provincial	MID	16 March 2021	ZANU-PF	Sibusiso Moyo	Death of member on 20 January 2021	ZANU-PF	Frederick Makamure Shava
Provincial	MCL	19 March 2021	ZANU-PF	Ellen Gwaradzimba	Death of member on 15 January 2021	ZANU-PF	Dorothy Mabika
Provincial	MCL	11 June 2021	MDC Alliance	Christine Rambanepasi	Death of member on 3 January 2021	MDC-T	Edith Baipai
Provincial	MBS	18 February 2022	ZANU-PF	Simon Khaya Moyo	Death of member on 14 November 2021	ZANU-PF	Nicholas Nkomo
Provincial	MBN	22 April 2022	MDC Alliance	Phyllis Ndlovu	Death of member on 1 February 2022	MDC Alliance	Chinyani Chezha
Disabilities	Female	14 May 2022	—N/a	Rejoice Timire	Death of member on 10 August 2021	—N/a	Nasper Manyau
Provincial	BYO	11 November 2022	MDC-T	Mildred Reason Dube	Death of member on 27 June 2022	MDC Alliance	Marilyn Nobuhle Ndiweni
Disabilities	Male	19 November 2022	—N/a	Watson Khupe	Death of member on 17 July 2022	—N/a	Ishumael Zhou
Provincial	HRE	31 March 2023	ZANU-PF	Oliver Chidawu	Death of member on 19 July 2022	ZANU-PF	Godfrey Gijima
