= Apollonia Munzverengwi =

Zimbabwean politician

The Honourable Apollonia Munzverengwi Sen.

Senator for Mashonaland East
- Incumbent
- Assumed office 26 August 2018
- President: Emmerson Mnangagwa

Minister of State for Provincial Affairs and Devolution for Mashonaland East
- In office 10 September 2018 – 11 February 2025
- President: Emmerson Mnangagwa
- Preceded by: David Musabayana
- Succeeded by: Itayi Ndudzo

Personal details
- Born: 3 May 1959 (age 67) Wedza
- Party: ZANU-PF

Apollonia Munzverengwi is a Zimbabwean politician who serves as a Senator representing Mashonaland East. She is a member of ZANU–PF. She was fired from the position of Minister of State for Provincial Affairs and Devolution for Mashonaland East Province on 11 of February 2025 by President Mnangagwa, for being against the party's attempt to illegally extend the presidential term.

== Background ==
=== Early life ===
Munzverengwi was born on 3 May 1959, in Wedza. She grew up in a family of six children and was raised by her parents, who were both farmers.

=== Career ===
Munzverengwi started her career as a teacher and later became a politician. She joined the Zimbabwe African National Union-Patriotic Front (ZANU-PF) party and rose through the ranks to become a prominent figure in the party. She was appointed Provincial Affairs Minister and Member of Parliament representing Mashonaland East in 2018.

==== Electoral history ====
Munzverengwi was elected as the Senator for Mashonaland East in 2018, representing ZANU-PF.

== Personal life ==
Munzverengwi is married and has three children. She is a member of the Methodist Church.

== Allegations ==
In 2019, Munzverengwi was involved in a scandal after her semi-nude pictures leaked onto social media, which she claimed was due to her phone being hacked.
