= Judith Tobaiwa =

Zimbabwean politician

Judith Tobaiwa MP

Member of the Zimbabwean Parliament for Kwekwe Central
- Incumbent
- Assumed office 5 April 2022
- Preceded by: Masango Matambanadzo

Personal details
- Born: 1986 or 1987 (age 39–40)
- Party: Citizens Coalition For Change (2022–present)
- Other political affiliations: Movement for Democratic Change – Tsvangirai/MDC Alliance (Until 2022)
- Parent: Shadreck Tobaiwa (father)

Judith Tobaiwa (born 1986 or 1987) is a Zimbabwean politician who was elected to the National Assembly of Zimbabwe in a by-election on 26 March 2022. She represents Kwekwe Central as a member of the Citizens Coalition For Change.

== Background ==
Tobaiwa's late father, Shadreck, served as the mayor of Kwekwe from 2008 until 2013 and as the city's deputy mayor from 2018 until his death from prostate cancer in 2021.

Tobaiwa was a member of the Zimbabwe National Student Union (Zinasu) at the Kwekwe Polytechnic. She joined the Movement for Democratic Change – Tsvangirai as a ward treasurer in Kwekwe and gradually rose through the party's ranks. She was also the personal assistant of former MDC-T Kwekwe Central MP Blessing Chebundo.

== Parliamentary career ==
In October 2020, Tobaiwa won the MDC Alliance's primary election to determine the party's candidate for the by-election in Kwekwe Central following the death of the constituency's sitting Member of Parliament Masango Matambanadzo from the National Patriotic Front.

In January 2022, Tobaiwa defected to former MDC Alliance leader Nelson Chamisa's new party, the Citizens Coalition for Change, and was the fielded as the party's candidate in the Kwekwe Central by-election. She won the by-election on 26 March 2022, becoming the first woman to serve as the Member of Parliament for the constituency since Zimbabwe's attainment of independence in 1980. On her election, Tobaiwa said that the poor must benefit from Kwekwe's gold mines. Tobaiwa was sworn in as a member of the National Assembly of Zimbabwe on 5 April 2022.

In April 2023, Tobaiwa received the CCC's nomination to stand in Kwekwe Central at the 2023 general elections. She retained the seat for the CCC at the general election.
