= Electoral history of Emmerson Mnangagwa =

Zimbabwe politician, President of Zimbabwe

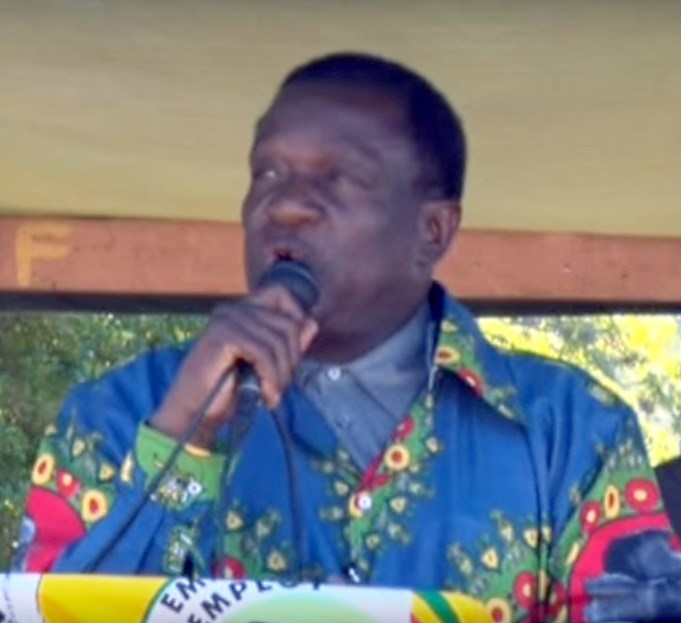
Mnangagwa in 2015.

Emmerson Mnangagwa is the third and current President of Zimbabwe since 24 November 2017. Previously, he served as Vice-President of Zimbabwe from 2014 to 2017, and in various cabinet portfolios before that. Mnangagwa was a member of the Parliament of Zimbabwe from 1985 to 2015.

== Parliamentary elections ==
=== 1985 election ===
1985 election, Kwekwe East
| Candidate | Party | Votes | % |
|---|---|---|---|
| Emmerson Mnangagwa | ZANU–PF | 37,017 | 86.0 |
| Elias Hananda | ZAPU | 4,733 | 11.0 |
| Kenneth Kaparepare | UANC | 1,313 | 3.0 |
| Total | | 43,063 | |

=== 1990 election ===
1990 election, Kwekwe
| Candidate | Party | Votes | % |
|---|---|---|---|
| Emmerson Mnangagwa | ZANU–PF | 23,898 | 77.1 |
| Sylvester Chibanda | ZUM | 7,094 | 22.9 |
| Total | | 30,992 | |

=== 1995 election ===
1995 election, Kwekwe
| Candidate | Party | Votes | % |
|---|---|---|---|
| Emmerson Mnangagwa | ZANU–PF | N/A | N/A |
| N/A | N/A | N/A | N/A |
| Total | | N/A | |

=== 2000 election ===
2000 election, Kwekwe
| Candidate | Party | Votes | % |
|---|---|---|---|
| Blessing Chebundo | MDC | 15,388 | 63.7 |
| Emmerson Mnangagwa | ZANU–PF | 8,352 | 34.6 |
| Milton Chinamasa | Ind. | 227 | 0.9 |
| Cuthbert Mwenye Chidava | UP | 176 | 0.7 |
| Total | | 24,143 | |

=== 2005 election ===
2005 election, Kwekwe
| Candidate | Party | Votes | % |
|---|---|---|---|
| Blessing Chebundo | MDC | 12,989 | 53.9 |
| Emmerson Mnangagwa | ZANU–PF | 11,124 | 46.1 |
| Total | | 24,113 | |

=== 2008 election ===
2008 election, Chirumanzu–Zibagwe
| Candidate | Party | Votes | % |
|---|---|---|---|
| Emmerson Mnangagwa | ZANU–PF | 9,645 | 77.2 |
| Mudavanhu Masendeke | MDC–T | 1,548 | 12.4 |
| Thomas Michael Dzingisai | MDC–T | 894 | 7.2 |
| Edward Fika | MDC–M | 406 | 3.2 |
| Total | | 12,493 | |

=== 2013 election ===
2013 election, Chirumanzu–Zibagwe
| Candidate | Party | Votes | % |
|---|---|---|---|
| Emmerson Mnangagwa | ZANU–PF | 17,996 | 84.5 |
| Ishmael Jeko | MDC–T | 2,803 | 13.2 |
| Janet Zinyemba | MDC–N | 503 | 2.4 |
| Total | | 21,302 | |

== Speaker of Parliament election, 2000 ==
2000 Speaker of the House of Assembly election
| Candidate | Party | Votes | % |
|---|---|---|---|
| Emmerson Mnangagwa | ZANU–PF | 87 | 59.6 |
| Mike Mataure | MDC | 59 | 40.4 |
| Total | | 146 | |

== Presidential election, 2018 ==
2018 presidential election
| Candidate | Party | Votes | % |
|---|---|---|---|
| Emmerson Mnangagwa | ZANU–PF | 2,460,463 | 50.8 |
| Nelson Chamisa | MDC Alliance | 2,147,436 | 44.3 |
| Others | | 167,669 | 3.5 |
| Total | | 4,775,568 | |

== See also ==
- Elections in Zimbabwe
