= Mudehwe =

Mudehwe is a Zimbabwean surname. Notable people with the surname include:

- Lawrence Mudehwe, a Zimbabwean politician, mayor of Mutare
- Marshal Mudehwe, a Zimbabwean footballer
