= Minister of State for Provincial Affairs and Devolution for Mashonaland East =

- Incumbent; Itayi Ndudzo since 11 February 2025
- Minister of State for Provincial Affairs
- Style: The Honourable
- Member of: Cabinet of Zimbabwe; Parliament of Zimbabwe
- Reports to: The President
- Seat: New Government Complex, Marondera
- Appointer: The President
- Term length: Five years, renewable for a second or subsequent term of office
- Constituting instrument: Provincial Councils and Administration Act (Chapter 29:11)
- Precursor: Provincial Governor of Mashonaland East
- Formation: 22 August 2013
- Deputy: Permanent Secretary for Provincial Affairs and Devolution
- Website: testdomain3.gov.zw

The Minister of State for Provincial Affairs and Devolution for Mashonaland East is the Provincial Minister of State for Mashonaland East in Zimbabwe. The minister oversees provincial affairs and sits in the Parliament of Zimbabwe. The minister is appointed by the President of Zimbabwe and is appointed for a term of five years, which can be renewed for a second or subsequent term. Historically, the minister held the title Governor of Mashonaland East, but the office has since been renamed to align with the 2013 Constitution of Zimbabwe, which does not allow for Provincial Governors.

== List of Ministers ==
Parliamentary position: Elected Member of the House of Assembly Elected Member of the Senate Non-Elected Minister

No.	Name Birth–Death	Term in office	Party	Appointed by
Provincial Governors
	Rwizi Ziyenge (Note: Ziyenge was elected MP to the House of Assembly in 1980. He was a Senator following the 1985 elections. The Senate was abolished in 1987.); 25 May 1933 - 11 January 1990	2 March 1984 – 11 January 1990	ZANU-PF	Robert Mugabe
	Abraham Kabasa; 22 December 1932 - 29 April 2023	1 April 1990 – 1 January 1993	ZANU-PF	Robert Mugabe
	Edmund Garwe; 1938 - 28 August 1997	1 January 1993 – 9 May 1996	ZANU-PF	Robert Mugabe
	David Karimanzira; 25 May 1947 - 24 March 2011	9 May 1996 – 15 April 2005	ZANU-PF	Robert Mugabe
	Ray Kaukonde b. 4 March 1963	15 April 2005 – 30 April 2008	ZANU-PF	Robert Mugabe
	Aeneas Chigwedere; 25 November 1939 – 22 January 2021	25 August 2008 – 28 June 2013	ZANU-PF	Robert Mugabe
Ministers of State for Provincial Affairs
	Simbaneuta Mudarikwa	25 August 2013 – 9 December 2014	ZANU-PF	Robert Mugabe
	Joel Biggie Matiza; 17 August 1960 – 22 January 2021	12 December 2014 – 6 July 2015	ZANU-PF	Robert Mugabe
	Ambrose Mutinhiri b. 22 February 1944	6 July 2015 – 21 November 2017	ZANU-PF	Robert Mugabe
	David Musabayana	4 December 2017 – 29 July 2018	ZANU-PF	Emmerson Mnangagwa
	Apollonia Munzverengwi b. 3 May 1959	10 September 2018 – 11 February 2025	ZANU-PF	Emmerson Mnangagwa
	Itayi Ndudzo	11 February 2025 – present	ZANU-PF	Emmerson Mnangagwa

== See also ==
- List of current provincial governors of Zimbabwe
