= Minister of State for Provincial Affairs and Devolution for Manicaland =

Ministerial office in Zimbabwe

- Incumbent; Misheck Mugadza since 12 September 2023
- Minister of State for Provincial Affairs
- Style: The Honourable
- Member of: Cabinet of Zimbabwe; Parliament of Zimbabwe
- Reports to: The President
- Seat: Mutare
- Appointer: The President
- Term length: Five years, renewable for a second or subsequent term of office
- Constituting instrument: Provincial Councils and Administration Act (Chapter 29:11)
- Precursor: Provincial Governor of Manicaland
- Formation: 22 August 2013
- Deputy: Permanent Secretary for Provincial Affairs and Devolution

The Minister of State for Provincial Affairs and Devolution for Manicaland is the Provincial Minister of State for Manicaland Province in Zimbabwe. The minister oversees provincial affairs and sits in the Parliament of Zimbabwe. The minister is appointed by the President of Zimbabwe and is appointed for a term of five years, which can be renewed for a second or subsequent term. Historically, the minister held the title Governor of Manicaland, but the office has since been renamed to align with the 2013 Constitution of Zimbabwe, which does not allow for Provincial Governors.

== List of Ministers ==
Parliamentary position: Elected Member of the House of Assembly Elected Member of the Senate Non-Elected Minister

No.	Name Birth–Death	Term in office	Party	Appointed by
Provincial Governors
	Joshua Dhube (Note: Dhube was elected MP to the House of Assembly in 1980. He was a Senator following the 1985 elections. The Senate was abolished in 1987.) b. 10 January 1934	2 March 1984 –	ZANU-PF	Robert Mugabe
	Kenneth Manyonda; 1934 - 10 November 2022	1 April 1990 – July 2000	ZANU-PF	Robert Mugabe
	Oppah Muchinguri b. 14 December 1958	15 July 2000 – 1 December 2003	ZANU-PF	Robert Mugabe
	Michael Nyambuya b. 23 July 1955	1 December 2003 – 12 April 2005	ZANU-PF	Robert Mugabe
	Tinaye Chigudu; 13 August 1942–5 February 2025	12 April 2005 – 30 April 2008	ZANU-PF	Robert Mugabe
	Chris Mushohwe; 6 February 1954 – 13 February 2023	25 August 2008 – 28 June 2013	ZANU-PF	Robert Mugabe
Ministers of State for Provincial Affairs
1	Chris Mushohwe; 6 February 1954 – 13 February 2023	11 September 2013 – 12 December 2014	ZANU-PF	Robert Mugabe
2	Mandi Chimene b. 8 June 1959	12 December 2014 – 21 November 2017	ZANU-PF	Robert Mugabe
3	Monica Mutsvangwa b.28 November 1961	4 December 2017 – 29 July 2018	ZANU-PF	Emmerson Mnangagwa
4	Ellen Gwaradzimba; 25 December 1960–15 January 2021	10 September 2018 – 15 January 2021	ZANU-PF	Emmerson Mnangagwa
5	Nokuthula Matsikenyere b.7 June 1964	8 February 2021 – 22 August 2023	ZANU-PF	Emmerson Mnangagwa
6	Misheck Mugadza b.17 July 1966	12 September 2023 – present	ZANU-PF	Emmerson Mnangagwa

== See also ==
- List of current provincial governors of Zimbabwe
