= Kureya =

Kureya is a surname. Notable people with the surname include:

- Kwayedza Kureya (fl. from 2017), British-Zimbabwean actor
- Samantha Kureya (born 1986), Zimbabwean comedian
