= GZF =

GZF or GzF may refer to:

- GzF, abbreviation for Gesellschaft zur Förderung, liaison office established by the Machinery and Equipment Manufacturers Association
- Global Zimbabwe Forum, organization that Zimbabwean lawyer Daniel Molokele participated in
- GZF, ICD-10 Procedure Coding System classification for hypnosis
