= Kwekwe Central =

Constituency of the Parliament of Zimbabwe

- Constituency for the National Assembly of Zimbabwe
- Province: Midlands
- Region: Kwekwe

Current constituency
- Seats: 1
- Party: Citizens Coalition for Change
- Member(s): Judith Tobaiwa

Kwekwe Central is a constituency of the National Assembly of the Parliament of Zimbabwe, centered on the city of Kwekwe in Midlands Province. It is currently represented by Judith Tobaiwa of the Citizens Coalition for Change, who was elected in a 26 March 2022 by-election. The previous MP for Kwekwe Central, Masango Matambanadzo of the National Patriotic Front, died on 28 July 2020.

== Members ==
An older constituency called Que Que (the town's colonial name until 1982) was represented in the Parliament of Rhodesia from 1928 until 1979.

| Election | Name | Party |
Que Que
| 1928 | Arthur James Taylor | Rhodesia Party |
| 1933 | Charles Leppington | Reform |
| 1934 | Charles Leppington | United |
| 1939 | Charles Leppington | United |
| 1946 | George Davenport | United |
| 1948 | George Davenport | United |
| 1954 | George Davenport | United |
| 1958 | Morris Hirsch | United Federal |
| 1962 | Andrew Dunlop | Rhodesian Front |
| 1965 | Andrew Dunlop | Rhodesian Front |
| 1970 | Jacobus Burger | Rhodesian Front |
| 1974 | Jacobus Burger | Rhodesian Front |
| 1977 | Jacobus Burger | Rhodesian Front |
Constituency abolished 1979–1990
Kwekwe
| 1990 | Emmerson Mnangagwa | ZANU–PF |
| 1995 | Emmerson Mnangagwa | ZANU–PF |
| 2000 | Blessing Chebundo | MDC |
| 2005 | Blessing Chebundo | MDC |
Kwekwe Central
| 2008 | Blessing Chebundo | MDC–T |
| 2013 | Masango Matambanadzo | ZANU–PF |
| 2018 | Masango Matambanadzo | NPF |
| 2022 by-election | Judith Tobaiwa | CCC |
| 2023 | Judith Tobaiwa | CCC |

== Election results ==
2022 by-election: Kwekwe Central
| Candidate | Party | Votes | % | +/– |
|---|---|---|---|---|
| Judith Tobaiwa | CCC | 6,639 | 67.52 | New |
| John Mapurazi | ZANU–PF | 2,883 | 29.32 | +7.02 |
| Lenin Tafadzwa Dzingire | United Zimbabwe Alliance | 165 | 1.68 | New |
| Mbekezeli Ndlovu | MDC Alliance | 145 | 1.47 | -33.26 |
| Total | | 9,832 | 100.00 | – |
| Majority | | 3,756 | 32.2 | +29.96 |
| CCC gain from National Patriotic Front | | | | |

== See also ==
- List of Zimbabwean parliamentary constituencies
