= Marvel Act Youth Organisation =

Marvel Act Youth Organisation is a Zimbabwean non-profit organisation. It is the first youth led community based organisation to be established in Mashonaland East, Mutoko.

== Background ==
The organization also known as M.A.Y.O started in 2003 as just a youth drama group for raising awareness on issues to do with drug abuse, HIV and AIDS, Sexual and Reproductive Health and became an affiliate member to the National Association of Non-Governmental Organizations in 2005.

The organization has worked in collaboration with various local and international organizations in several activities and established various projects to address challenges affecting rural youths and Women which include, Leadership and Peace building trainings, Peace building Concerts, Mhanduwe Mutoko Arts and Culture Festival annual event, Young Women Symposiums, Feminism symposiums, School Mate Program with Plan International, Theatre trainings and Arts Festival with support from Culture Fund of Zimbabwe Trust and SIDA, Sports tournaments, Youth Volunteers “Voices from Below” project with support from the European Union and Young Voices Network, Peer Education and facilitation program, Changing the Rivers flow with PADARE and SAFAIDS and Youth information and Resource.

MAYO is a member of Girls Not Brides a global movement of more than 500 organizations in more than 72 countries campaigning for the end of Early Child Marriages, it is also a partner organization to Child Online Africa an organization that is advocating for online safety for young people and Reinventing Democracy Africa Initiative.
