= Angeline Gata =

Zimbabwean politician

The Hon. Angeline Gata MP

Deputy Minister of Primary and Secondary Education
- Incumbent
- Assumed office 12 September 2023
- President: Emmerson Mnangagwa
- Minister: Torerayi Moyo
- Preceded by: Edgar Moyo

Member of Parliament for Mutema-Musikavanhu
- Incumbent
- Assumed office 4 September 2023
- President: Emmerson Mnangagwa
- Preceded by: New constituency
- Constituency: Mutema-Musikavanhu
- Majority: 2,242 (8.7%)

Personal details
- Party: ZANU-PF

Angeline Gata is a Zimbabwean politician. She is the current Deputy Minister of Primary and Secondary Education of Zimbabwe and a member of parliament. She is a member of ZANU–PF.
