= Ministry of Primary and Secondary Education (Zimbabwe) =

Government ministry of Zimbabwe

Agency overview
- Type: Ministry
- Jurisdiction: Government of Zimbabwe
- Headquarters: 88 Kwame Nkurumah Ave, Corner Kwame Nkurumah Ave and Sam Nujoma Street, Harare; 17.827205195567895°S 31.050878173703268°E
- Minister responsible: Torerayi Moyo, Minister of Primary and Secondary Education
- Deputy Minister responsible: Angeline Gata, Deputy Minister of Primary and Secondary Education
- Agency executive: Moses Mhike, Permanent Secretary
- Website: mopse.gov.zw

The Ministry of Primary and Secondary Education is a department in the Government of Zimbabwe that is responsible for the management of primary and secondary education within the country. The incumbent minister is Torerayi Moyo, Deputy Minister Angeline Gata and Permanent Secretary Moses Mhike who were appointed in September 2023.
