= Gumbonzvanda High School =

School in Zimbabwe

Location
- Wedza District, Mashonaland East Province; Zimbabwe; 18.692075°S 31.684523°E

Information
- Forms: 1-6

Gumbonzvanda High School is a high school located in Wedza District, Mashonaland East Province, Zimbabwe. It is known for its victory in soccer under 20 boys which it won a trophy in 2015. It is a high school accommodates form one to form six.
