= Nash Paints =

- Industry: Paint Production Industry
- Founder: Tinashe Mutarisi
- Headquarters: Harare, Zimbabwe
- Key people: Tinashe Mutarisi, founder and executive chairman
- Products: Paint
- Number of employees: 500+
- Website: nashpaints.co.zw

Nash Paints is a paint company in Zimbabwe with interests in Southern Africa. As of 2017 the company had 20 branches throughout Zimbabwe with a plant that manufactures 50,000 litres (11,000 imp gal; 13,000 US gal) of paint a day. Tinashe Mutarisi is the founder and executive chairman of the company.

In 2017, the company announced plans to build a factory in Zambia.

== History ==
Nash Paints was formed by Tinashe Mutarisi. The company started operations in 2006 as a small company with only three employees at their first branch located at Chikwanha shopping centre in Chitungwiza. Mutarisi registered the company on March 27, 2007. The initial capital that was used to start the company was from Mutarisi's personal savings but later on he obtained financial support from financial institutions for expansion and growth in the later years.

In 2010, Nash Paints acquired 75 percent shares in Eastlea Paints as well as a building previously owned by Rafiq Khan. Between 2008 and 2016 Nash Paints opened branches in Bluffhill, Msasa, Gazaland, Mbare, Graniteside, Masvingo, Kwekwe, Gweru, Bulawayo, Mutare, Bindura, Chinhoyi, Kadoma and Marondera.

== Controversy ==
In February 2018, Nash Paints announced Jah Prayzah as the company's new brand ambassador, which led to some criticism in the arts industry. The previous brand ambassador since 2014 was Alick Macheso.
