= Misheck Kagurabadza =

Zimbabwean politician and businessman

Misheck Kagurabadza was a businessman and former mayor of Mutare, Zimbabwe, and was the MDC-Tsvangirai member of the house of assembly (MP) for the parliamentary constituency of Mutasa South. He died in 2015 after a short illness.
