= Samantha Kureya =

Zimbabwean comedian (born 1986)

- Born: September 16, 1986 (age 40); Mufakose, Zimbabwe
- Other name: Gonyeti
- Occupation: Comedian
- Employer: Bustop TV

Samantha Kureya, also known by her stage name Gonyeti, is a Zimbabwean comedian known for her political satire and resulting harassment by the Zimbabwean government.

== Biography ==
Kureya was born 16 September 1986, in Mufakose, Zimbabwe, the eldest of four children. She attended Mufakose High School. Her mother was an actress; Kureya's first acting role was in 2008 in the local drama "Kusika Moto". She has since acted in a number of television shows. In 2015, she joined the online comedy channel PO Box TV, which later rebranded to Bustop TV. She received her stage name in her first skit, named after a Shona slang term for a type of large truck. Alongside Sharon "Magi" Chideu, Felistas "Mai T" Murata, and Tyra "Madam Boss" Chikocho, she performs the skit comedy show Drama Queens on Bustop TV.

== Harassment and kidnapping ==
Kureya has performed multiple skits satirizing the Zimbabwean government and police. In February 2019, Gonyeti and Chideu were arrested and fined US$20 for wearing police uniforms in a 2016 comedy video, with the police warning the pair that their skits were becoming increasingly political. This led to condemnation from two former ministers of Zimbabwe and the US embassy in Harare.

On 21 August 2019, Kureya was abducted by masked men armed with assault rifles who identified themselves as police officers. She was subsequently beaten with sjamboks, stripped naked, and forced to drink water contaminated with sewage. Several human rights organizations, including Amnesty International and the Media Institute of Southern Africa, condemned the kidnapping. Nelson Chamisa, the leader of the opposition party Movement for Democratic Change, accused President Emmerson Mnangagwa of being behind the attack. Government officials asserted that reports of abduction were staged in order to harm Zimbabwe's reputation internationally.

Kureya has been repeatedly targeted online due to her weight, though she says she is proud of her body regardless of other's comments.

== Awards ==
In 2017, Kureya became the first woman nominated for the National Arts Merit Awards, in the category of "Outstanding Comedian". She was nominated again in 2018. She and Chideu together won the 2016 People’s Choice Award at the Zimbabwe Women Awards. Kureya was given the Human Rights Defender of the Year Award by the Southern Africa Human Rights Defender Network in 2019.
