= Tinashe Mutarisi =

Zimbabwean businessman

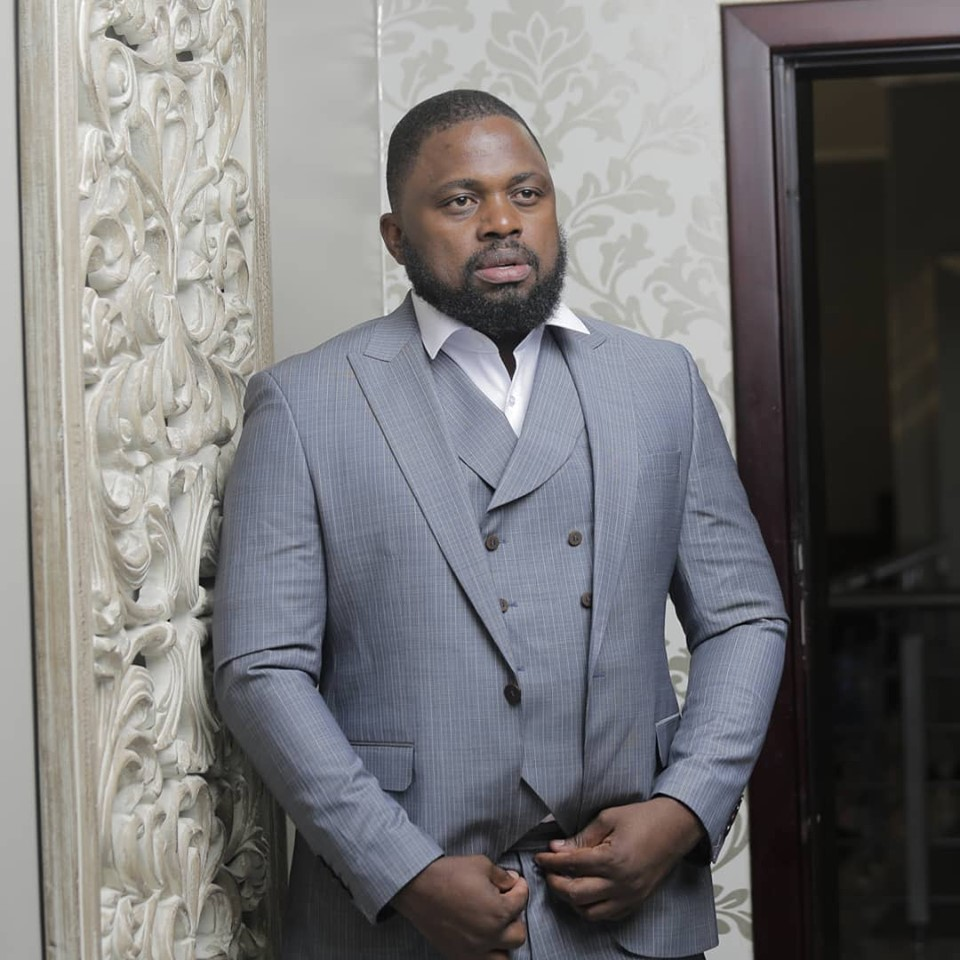
- Born: Harare, Zimbabwe
- Education: Chinhoyi University of Technology
- Occupation: Businessman
- Years active: Since 2006
- Organization(s): Project 56, Nash Furnitures, Nash Paints Holdings NashtvZimbabwe
- Known for: Entrepreneurship Philanthropy
- Children: 5

Tinashe Mutarisi is a Zimbabwean businessman. He is the founder and Chairman of Nash Paints, one of the top paint manufacturing and distribution companies in Zimbabwe which is a subsidiary of NASH Holdings. He was listed on Ngoda Business Most Influential Entrepreneurs in Zimbabwe Under-40.

== Early life ==
Tinashe Mutarisi was born in Wedza at Mount St Marys'. He grew up in Inyati Mine where he attended his primary education at Inyati Mine Primary School. He then attended high school at Mavhudzi Secondary school.

== Business career ==
Mutarisi Started off with Nash Paints in 2006 at Chikwanha Shopping Centre in Chitungwiza with three employees and the company grew to 36 branches with more than 500 employees across Zimbabwe. With success of Nash Paints, Mutarisi founded NASH Holdings. NASH Holdings houses several companies including for Nash Paints, Eastlea Paints, Nashrin Cargo Carriers, Avion, Spec Paints, Fishmongers Penman, Furnitures' Coloursel, Nash Furnitures, Project56 Construction and is the chairman of NASH Holdings. He also has operations in Zambia South Africa and Botswana. He holds an MBA from Marjon University (UK).

In 2017, Tinashe Mutarisi was listed at number two on Ngoda Business Most Influential Entrepreneurs in Zimbabwe Under 40. The adjudication is done under the categories of National Relevance, Global Appeal, Social Impact, Motivation/Leadership, Economic Value, General Influence and Brand Equity among others. In 2020 he joined music industry through Nashtvzimbabwe

== Philanthropy ==
Through his brand Nash Paints, the entrepreneur has been supportive of the arts and entertainment, supporting Bustop TV, Jah Prayzah's Military Touch Movement as well as partnering events such as the Alfred Kainga comedy Show. Most of his philanthropy work are carried through his House of Hope foundation and The Tinashe Mutarisi Trust.

== Awards and recognition ==
- Top Business Leader of the Year — Paint and Construction industry - 2016
- Megafest Businessman of the Year award 2016
- Top leadership Excellence Award 2016
- Business Man of the Year 2017
- Zimbabwe Institute of Management Young leader of the year 2017
- Standards Association of Zimbabwe (SAZ) Quality Man of the year 2018

== Music videos ==
List of music videos, with year, title, artist(s), role and reference(s) shown
| Year | Title | Artist(s) | Role | Notes | Ref. |
|---|---|---|---|---|---|
| 2022 | Robbery | Freeman HKD | boss | Voice | |
