= John Houghton (Zimbabwean politician) =

Zimbabwean politician

Member of the Parliament of Zimbabwe
- Incumbent
- Assumed office September 2018
- Constituency: Kariba

Personal details
- Born: John Roland Houghton; 9 September 1945 (age 80) Salisbury, Southern Rhodesia (now Harare, Zimbabwe)
- Party: MDC Alliance

John Roland Houghton (born 9 September 1945) is a Zimbabwean politician who is currently serving as the Member of Parliament for Kariba. He was first elected in the 2018 Zimbabwean general election as a member of the Movement for Democratic Change – Tsvangirai (MDC–T). He previously served as the mayor of Kariba.

== Early life ==
John Houghton was born on September 9, 1945, in Salisbury, Southern Rhodesia (now Harare, Zimbabwe). He is of English descent.

== Career ==
Houghton worked as an electrical engineer prior to being elected the Mayor of Kariba in 2003. In the 2018 Zimbabwean general election, he was elected to represent Kariba in the Parliament of Zimbabwe.
