= Ambrose Mutinhiri =

Zimbabwean politician

Ambrose Mutinhiri (born 22 February 1944) is a Zimbabwean politician who served as the Minister of Youth Development and Employment Creation. A retired army commander and brigadier, he was appointed Minister of Youth Development, Gender and Employment Creation on 9 February 2004. He was trained in Russia during the Rhodesian Bush War. He is known for training soldiers during this period. General Solomon Mujuru testified that he was trained by Mutinhiri.

Mutinhiri was nominated as ZANU-PF's candidate for the House of Assembly seat for Marondera, a constituency in Mashonaland East, in the March 2008 parliamentary election. According to official results, he won the seat with 4,284 votes against 2,132 votes for a candidate of the Movement for Democratic Change.

He was placed on the United States sanctions list in 2005.

== Resignation ==
Mutinhiri resigned as the MP for ZANU-PF after the resignation of Robert Mugabe. Mutinhiri, together with Sandi Moyo and Jealousy Mawarire, with the help of Grace Mugabe and Patrick Zhuwao formed the National Patriotic Front (NPF) and contested the 2018 harmonised elections.

Prior to the elections, the NPF split, with one faction linked to Robert Mugabe and the other to Grace Mugabe. Mutinhiri received less than 0.01% of the votes in the election, which was won by Emmerson Mnangagwa of ZANU-PF.
