= Chenhamo Chimutengwende =

Zimbabwean politician (1943–2025)

- Born: Chenhamo Chakezha Chimutengwende; 28 August 1943; Chiweshe, Mazowe District, Mashonaland Central Province, Zimbabwe
- Died: 16 January 2025 (aged 81)
- Education: University of Bradford
- Occupation: Politician

Chenhamo Chakezha "Chen" Chimutengwende (28 August 1943 – 16 January 2025) was a Zimbabwean politician who was the Minister of State for Public and Interactive Affairs, and a longstanding supporter of Robert Mugabe. On 31 March 2008, Chimutengwende lost his parliamentary seat in the general election, which ended his 23-year career as a Member of Parliament. From September 2009, he was chairman of the Zimbabwe Foundation for Sustainable Development.

== Early years ==
Chimutengwende was born on 28 August 1943, in Chiweshe, Mazowe District, Mashonaland Central Province, to John Nyangoni and Ronia Nyangoni (née Rusere). He was the third of the family's eight children. He attended Gweshe Primary School in Chiweshe, followed by Highfield Secondary School in 1956.

During the 1960s and 1970s, Chimutengwende lived in exile in London, England, where he directed the Europe-Africa Research Project from a basement in Gower Street. He was a member of the editorial board of Red Mole, a paper closely associated with the International Marxist Group. A staunch supporter of Mao Zedong's China, he resigned from the editorial board when the paper criticised Mao's policies with regard to the Bangladesh Liberation War of 1971.

Chimutengwende earned a master's degree in social science and a PhD from the University of Bradford, writing a doctoral thesis on "Mass Media and the State in the Socio-Economic Development Process". He was the author of the book South Africa: The Press and the Politics of Liberation (London: Barbican Books, 1978).

== Zimbabwean politics ==
After Zimbabwean relations with Britain worsened during the early 2000s, Chimutengwende was used by the party as a negotiator. He had many personal ties to London and many connections within British politics. His attempts at reconciliation did not bear much fruit, however, as the governments of Tony Blair and Robert Mugabe continued to denounce one another in public.

During the 2005 parliamentary election, Chimutengwende's opponent Shepherd Mushonga accused him of being hypocritical for supporting Mugabe. Chimutengwende responded by saying to a crowd in Mazowe: "I love England, that country will always have a special place in my heart, but I am a proud Zimbabwean and always will be." Shepherd Mushonga was notably in favour of Mugabe's controversial land reform programme, whereas Chimutengwende was more introspective about the issue. Chimutengwende said his position was that he favoured land reform as such, and land redistibution in particular, but he did not think it was done in a good way. He was, however. noted for being "deeply loyal" to President Robert Mugabe. Chimutengwende won the election with 18,041 votes, compared to 7,567 votes for Shepherd Mushonga and 386 votes for Gideon Chinogurei of the Zimbabwe African People's Union (ZAPU).

From 2005, Chimutengwende was placed on the United States sanctions list. He died on 16 January 2025, at the age of 81.
