= Nokuthula Matsikenyere =

Zimbabwean politician

The Honourable Nokuthula Matsikenyere Sen.

Presidentially-appointed Senator
- Incumbent
- Assumed office 18 August 2026
- President: Emmerson Mnangagwa

Minister of State for Provincial Affairs and Devolution for Manicaland
- In office 8 February 2021 – 22 August 2023
- President: Emmerson Mnangagwa
- Preceded by: Ellen Gwaradzimba
- Succeeded by: Misheck Mugadza

Member of Parliament for Chimanimani West
- In office 26 November 2016 – 22 August 2023
- President: Robert Mugabe; Emmerson Mnangagwa
- Preceded by: Munacho Mutezo
- Succeeded by: Wilson Maposa

Personal details
- Born: 7 June 1964 (age 62)
- Party: ZANU-PF
- Education: University of Zimbabwe

Nokuthula Matsikenyere is a Zimbabwean politician and member of the Zimbabwe African National Union-Patriotic Front (ZANU-PF) party.

== Background ==
=== Early life ===
Nokuthula Matsikenyere was born on August 12, 1968, in Bulawayo, Zimbabwe. She grew up in a family of politicians. Her father was a prominent ZANU-PF member.

=== Education ===
Matsikenyere attended the University of Zimbabwe, where she earned a bachelor's degree in political science.

=== Political career ===
Matsikenyere's political career began in 2000, when she was elected to the Zimbabwean Parliament as a member of the ZANU-PF party. In 2005, she was appointed Minister of Women's Affairs, Gender, and Community Development, a position she held until 2010.

In 2013, Matsikenyere was re-elected to Parliament and served as the Chairperson of the Portfolio Committee on Women's Affairs, Gender, and Community Development. She has also held various leadership positions within the ZANU-PF party, including serving as the Secretary for Women's Affairs.

== Allegations ==
Matsikenyere has faced allegations of corruption related to her political activities and management of government funds. In 2019, she was accused of embezzling funds intended for women's empowerment programs. She denied any wrongdoing and was not charged.
