= Mutasa South =

- Constituency for the National Assembly of Zimbabwe
- Province: Manicaland
- Region: Mutasa District

Current constituency
- Number of members: 1
- Party: ZANU–PF
- Member(s): Misheck Mugadza
- Created from: Mutasa

Mutasa South is a constituency represented in the National Assembly of the Parliament of Zimbabwe, located in Manicaland Province. Its current MP since a 2022 by-election is Misheck Mugadza of ZANU–PF. The seat was previous represented by Regai Tsunga of the Movement for Democratic Change Alliance until he was recalled in 2021.

== History ==
Mutasa South is a constituency of Zimbabwe in the province of Manicaland. It is also the central area of the Manyika tribe.

In 2008, the Movement for Democratic Change – Tsvangirai candidate Misheck Kagurabadza won against the ZANU-PF candidate.

In the 2018 election, the constituency was won by Regai Tsunga of the Movement for Democratic Change Alliance. Tsunga was recalled from parliament on 17 March 2021 amid factional disputes within the MDC Alliance. In a 26 March 2022 by-election, Misheck Mugadza of ZANU–PF was elected to the seat.

== Members ==
| Election | Member | Party |
|---|---|---|
| 2005 | Oppah Muchinguri | ZANU–PF |
| 2008 | Misheck Kagurabadza | MDC–T |
| 2013 | Irene Zindi | ZANU–PF |
| 2018 | Regai Tsunga | MDC Alliance |
| 2022 by-election | Misheck Mugadza | ZANU–PF |
| 2023 | Misheck Mugadza | ZANU–PF |

== Election results ==
2022 by-election: Mutasa South
| Candidate | Party | Votes | % | +/– |
|---|---|---|---|---|
| Misheck Mugadza | ZANU–PF | 5,818 | 51.49 | +6.56 |
| Regai Tsunga | CCC | 5,269 | 46.63 | New |
| Pedzisai Tauzeni | MDC Alliance | 162 | 1.43 | -50.72 |
| Eurydice Lynette Ndoro | Independent | 50 | 0.44 | New |
| Total | | 11,299 | 100.00 | – |
| Majority | | 549 | 4.86 | -2.36 |
| ZANU–PF gain from MDC Alliance | | | | |

== See also ==
- List of Zimbabwean parliamentary constituencies
