= Phyllis Ndlovu =

Zimbabwean politician (died 2022)

Phyllis Ndlovu (died 31 January 2022) was a Zimbabwean politician from the MDC Alliance. She was senator from Matabeleland North.

== See also ==
- List of members of the 9th Parliament of Zimbabwe
