= Lawrence Mudehwe =

Politician

Alderman Lawrence Mudehwe

Mayor of Mutare
- In office October 1990 – November 1995
- In office November 1995 – August 2003

Personal details
- Born: 26 July 1933 Mutasa District
- Died: 10 August 2022 (aged 89)
- Party: Movement for Democratic Change – Tsvangirai (1999–20??)

Alderman Lawrence Dambudzo Mudehwe (26 July 1933 – 10 August 2022) was a former mayor of Mutare. He was the first Executive Mayor to be elected as an independent candidate in Zimbabwe. He served as Executive mayor for thirteen years.
