= Rejoice Timire =

Zimbabwean activist and politician (1959–2021)

Member of the Senate of Zimbabwe for People with Disabilities
- In office August 2018 – 10 August 2021
- Preceded by: Annah Shiri
- Succeeded by: Nasper Manyau

Personal details
- Born: 7 April 1959 Musume, Mberengwa District, Southern Rhodesia
- Died: 10 August 2021 (aged 62) Harare, Zimbabwe
- Resting place: Glenforest Cemetery, Harare
- Party: ZANU–PF

Rejoice Timire (7 April 1959 – 10 August 2021) was a Zimbabwean disability activist and politician who served in the Senate of Zimbabwe from 2018 until her death in 2021, representing a specially allotted constituency for people with disabilities. A longtime advocate for disability rights, she played a key role in the addition of an official disability policy into the Constitution of Zimbabwe.

== Biography ==
Rejoice Timire was born on 7 April 1959 in the village of Musume in the Mberengwa District, Zimbabwe. She attended the Matedzi Primary School and Musume Secondary School. She studied business in university, and became a businesswoman by the mid-1990s. In 1998, Timire was in an accident in Cape Town, South Africa, resulting in a severe spinal injury and requiring her to use a wheelchair. Following her accident, she became a prominent advocate for disabled people, particularly disabled women, in Zimbabwe. She became a member of the Disabled Women's Support Organisation in 2003, and became the organization's executive director in the 2010s. She was also a member of the board of directors of the Women's Coalition of Zimbabwe and the Disability Board.

In August 2018, Timire was elected to the Senate of Zimbabwe to represent people with disabilities, a specially allotted constituency in which the one male and one female senator are elected by an electoral college open to delegates from registered disabilities organizations. She sat as a member of the ruling ZANU–PF party. Prior to becoming a senator, she was also a consultant for a joint initiative by the European Union and the United Nations regarding gender-based violence targeting women with disabilities in Zimbabwe.

Through her position as a senator, Timire partnered with the United Nations Partnership on the Rights of Persons with Disabilities and other disability rights organizations to draft an official disability policy for Zimbabwe. This process was intended to update the outdated Disabled Persons Act of 1992 and tie it to the Constitution of Zimbabwe. The National Disability Policy was officially launched by President Emmerson Mnangagwa in June 2021. Timire also advocated for better access to abortion, citing increasing deaths from unofficial back-alley abortions, as well as increased mental health resources for disabled people during the COVID-19 pandemic. In May 2021, she voted in favor of a constitutional amendment which expanded the powers of President Mnangagwa.

Timire died from COVID-19 at the Mbuya Dorcas Hospital in Harare on 10 August 2021, aged 62. She is buried in Harare's Glenforest Cemetery. Her death was eulogized by many prominent disability activists, including the heads of the National Disability Board and the Deaf Zimbabwe Trust, as well as fellow disabled senator Watson Khupe.
