= Levi Mayihlome =

Zimbabwean politician

The Hon. Brig. Gen. (Rtd) Levi Mayihlome MP

Deputy Minister of Defence
- Incumbent
- Assumed office 12 September 2023
- President: Emmerson Mnangagwa
- Minister: Oppah Muchinguri
- Preceded by: Victor Matemadanda

Member of Parliament for Umzingwane
- Incumbent
- Assumed office 26 August 2018
- President: Emmerson Mnangagwa
- Preceded by: William Makambaya Dewa
- Majority: 184 (1.3%)

Personal details
- Born: 4 November 1953 (age 72) Bonjeni, Umzingwane District
- Party: ZAPU (before 1987; ZANU–PF (from 1987)
- Education: University of Zimbabwe

Military service
- Allegiance: ZIPRA; Zimbabwe
- Branch/service: Zimbabwe National Army
- Rank: Brigadier general

Levi Mayihlome is a Zimbabwean politician. He is the current Deputy Minister of Defence of Zimbabwe and a member of parliament. He is the member of ZANU–PF. He was born in Bonjeni, a village in Umzingwane District.
