= Maxwell Mavhunga =

Zimbabwean politician

Maxwell Mavhunga MP

Member of the Zimbabwean Parliament for Chitungwiza South
- Incumbent
- Assumed office 5 September 2018
- Preceded by: Christopher Chigumba

Personal details
- Party: Citizens Coalition For Change (2022–present)
- Other political affiliations: Movement for Democratic Change – Tsvangirai/MDC Alliance (Until 2022)
- Children: 3

Maxwell Mavhunga is a Zimbabwean politician who has been Member of Parliament (MP) for Chitungwiza South in the Harare Province since 2018. Elected as a member of the MDC Alliance, he joined the Citizens Coalition for Change in 2022.

== Early career ==
Mavhunga worked as a lecturer at Trust Academy while studying at the University of Zimbabwe. He also lectured in Denmark and the Speciss College where he taught commercial law to students. Mavhunga graduated from the University of Zimbabwe with his law degree in 1999. After graduating, he began practicing as a lawyer.

== Political career ==
In 2014, Mavhunga became the provincial secretary for legal affairs of the Movement for Democratic Change – Tsvangirai. He was later elected as secretary for the Harare Province at the party's congress.

== Parliamentary career ==
Prior to the 2018 harmonised elections, Mavhunga was selected as the MDC Alliance's candidate for the Chitungwiza South parliamentary constituency. He was elected to Parliament at the election and named to the Parliamentary Legal Committee.

Mavhunga crossed the floor and joined former MDC Alliance leader Nelson Chamisa's new party, the Citizens Coalition for Change, shortly after its founding in 2022.

In August 2022, it was reported that local police officers had refused to utilise the satellite police station that Mavhunga had built in Unit L of the Chigumba area in his constituency with the Community Development Fund.

In June 2023, Mavhunga was selected as the Citizens Coalition for Change candidate for Chitungwiza South for the general elections on 23 August 2023. Mavhunga retained the seat at the general election, having received 10,145 votes.

== Personal life ==
Mavhunga is married and has three children.
