= Tsholotsho South =

Constituency of the Parliament of Zimbabwe

- Constituency for the National Assembly of Zimbabwe
- Province: Matabeleland North
- Region: Tsholotsho District

Current constituency
- Created: 2008
- Seats: 1
- Party: ZANU–PF
- Member(s): Musa Ncube

Tsholotsho South is a constituency represented in the National Assembly of the Parliament of Zimbabwe, located in Tsholotsho District in Matabeleland North Province. Its current MP since a 2022 by-election, and reelected in the 2023 general election, is Musa Ncube of ZANU–PF. The previous MP, Zenzo Sibanda, died in 2021.

== History ==
Tsholotsho South was created for the 2008 election.

== Members ==
Election	Name	Party
2008	Maxwell Dube	MDC–M
2013	Zenzo Sibanda	ZANU–PF
2018	Zenzo Sibanda	ZANU–PF
2022 by-election	Musa Ncube	ZANU–PF
2023	Musa Ncube	ZANU–PF

== Election results ==
2022 Zimbabwean by-elections
Candidate	Party	Votes	%	+/–
Musa Ncube	ZANU–PF	4,759	54.95	+0.92
Tapson Nganunu	CCC	2,879	33.24	New
Leonard Mthombemi	ZAPU	868	10.02	+6.85
Bongani Moyo	Independent	155	1.79	New
Total		8,661	100.00	–
Valid votes		8,661	98.71	+0.72
Invalid/blank votes		113	1.29	-0.72
Total votes		8,774	100.00	–
Registered voters/turnout		19,562	44.85	-32.68
Majority		1,880	21.71	-15.96
ZANU–PF hold				

== See also ==
- List of Zimbabwean parliamentary constituencies
