= Chitungwiza South =

Parliamentary constituency in Zimbabwe

- National Assembly constituency for the Parliament of Zimbabwe
- District: Chitungwiza
- Province: Harare
- Electorate: 35,312 (2023)

Current constituency
- Created: 2008
- Number of members: 1
- Party: Citizens Coalition for Change
- Member: Maxwell Mavhunga
- Created from: Chitungwiza

Chitungwiza South is a constituency represented in the National Assembly of the Parliament of Zimbabwe, located in Harare Province. It covers part of Chitungwiza, a dormitory city near Harare. Its current MP since the 2018 election is Maxwell Mavhunga of the Citizens Coalition for Change (previously of the Movement for Democratic Change Alliance).

== History ==
In 2008, the MDC-Tsvangirai's Misheck Shoko was elected MP for the constituency, defeating ZANU-PF's Chikavange Chigumba, MDC-Mutambara's Rosemary Mutore, independent candidate Farai Manyepxa, ZPPDP candidate Foreward Ngwindingwindi and ZDP candidate Costa Gombera.

== Members ==
Election	Name	Party
2008	Misheck Shoko	MDC–T
2013	Christopher Chigumba	ZANU–PF
2018	Maxwell Mavhunga	MDC Alliance
2023	Maxwell Mavhunga	CCC

== See also ==
- List of Zimbabwean parliamentary constituencies
