= Sithembile Gumbo =

Zimbabwean politician (died 2019)

Sithembile Gumbo (1962/1963 – 15 April 2019) was a Zimbabwean politician who served as MP for Lupane East.
