= Mayor of Mutare =

Executive of the government of Mutare, Zimbabwe

- Incumbent; Simon Chabuka since 28 November 2023
- Style: His Worship
- Inaugural holder: G. F. Dawson
- Formation: 1914; 112 years ago
- Website: Official webpage

The Mayor of Mutare is the executive of the government of Mutare, Zimbabwe (known as Umtali until 1983). The Mayor is a member of the Mutare City Council, and is assisted by a deputy mayor. The Mayor uses the style "His Worship". The current mayor is Simon Chabuka.

== History ==
The Town of Umtali became a municipality, in the form of a town, on 11 June 1914. Its first mayor, elected in August 1914, was G. F. Dawson. The mayor and new municipal council replaced the Sanitary Board which had previously governed the settlement.

In 1980, following Zimbabwe's independence, Davidson Jahwi was elected the first black Mayor of Umtali.

Umtali's name was changed to Mutare in 1983.

In 2005, Mayor Misheck Kagurabadza (MDC–T) was suspended from his position by the Minister of Local Government, Ignatius Chombo. Mutare, along with other major cities that had seen their democratically elected MDC–T mayors suspended, was governed by a ZANU–PF-dominated special commission until 2008.

In 2008, Brian James, a white MDC–T member, was elected mayor. He was suspended and then fired in 2008 by Ignatius Chombo, who accused James of mismanagement, misconduct, and insubordination. However, the firing was, in reality, thought to be politically motivated.

== List of mayors ==
The following is a list of past mayors of Mutare (previously known as Umtali until 1983).

Mayor	Term start	Term end	Party	Ref.
G. F. Dawson	1914	1916		
W. J. Hosgood	1916	1917		
G. F. Dawson	1917	1918		
Charles Eickhoff	1918	1920	RGA	
Jack Meikle	1920	1921		
W. J. McIntosh	1921	1922		
Jack Meikle	1922	1923		
W. Stevens	1923	1925		
J. H. Jeffreys	1925	1926		
Frederick J. Taylor	1926	1927		
W. J. McIntosh	1927	1928		
L. Miller	1928	1929		
Oswald Trevor Baker	1929	1932	Rhodesia Party	
JT Woods	1932	1934		
Alfred Bain	1934	1938		
George Washington Chace	1938	1941	Liberal Party	
W. R. Love	1941	1942		
Edward King Evans	1942	1945		
Demetrius Catsicas	1945	1948		
R. T. Perkins	1948	1949		
Saxon W. Wood	1949	1952		
Harry Went	1952	1953		
Johannes Mattheus Wessels	1953	1955		
Norman Innes	1955	1957		
Demetrius Catsicas	1957	1958		
George Robert Leach	1958	1959		
Jack Mussett	1959	1961		
Leslie Herbert Morris	1961	1964	United Federal Party	
James W. MacGregor	1964	1966		
W. W. S. Smart	1966	1968		
James Somerville Murray	1968	1969		
John Constantinos Kircos	1969	1972		
Douglas G. Reed	1972	1975		
John Charles Burke	August 1975	August 1977		
Douglas G. Reed	1977	1978		
Max Phillips	1978	1980		
Davidson Jahwi	November 1980	24 January 1984	ZANU–PF	
Enock Msabaeka	1984	1991		
Lawrence Mudehwe	October 1990	August 2003	ZANU–PF (before 1995)	
Lawrence Mudehwe	October 1990	August 2003	Independent (1995–1999)	
Lawrence Mudehwe	October 1990	August 2003	MDC–T (after 1999)	
Misheck Kagurabadza	2003	23 July 2005	MDC–T	
Mayor suspended; Mutare administered by a special commission
Brian James	2008	April 2013	MDC–T	
Tatenda Nhamarare	September 2013	September 2018	MDC–T	
Blessing Tandi	6 September 2018	11 February 2022	MDC Alliance	
Simon Chabuka	17 February 2022	August 2023	CCC	
Sophia Rudo Gwasira	11 September 2023	9 November 2023	CCC	
Simon Chabuka	28 November 2023		CCC	

== Deputy mayors ==
=== Notable former deputy mayors ===
- Leslie Herbert Morris, future mayor
- John Constantinos Kircos, future mayor
- E. M. Phillips, future mayor
