= Misheck Mugadza =

Zimbabwean politician

The Honourable Misheck Mugadza MP

Minister of State for Provincial Affairs and Devolution for Manicaland
- Incumbent
- Assumed office 12 September 2023
- President: Emmerson Mnangagwa
- Preceded by: Nokuthula Matsikenyere

Member of Parliament for Mutasa South
- Incumbent
- Assumed office 26 March 2022
- President: Emmerson Mnangagwa
- Preceded by: Regai Tsunga
- Majority: 1,225 (5.6%)

Personal details
- Born: 17 July 1966 (age 59) Buhera
- Party: ZANU-PF

Misheck Mugadza is a Zimbabwean politician and lawyer who has served as the Provincial Affairs Minister and Member of Parliament for Manicaland since 2022. He is a member of ZANU–PF.

== Background ==
=== Early life ===
Misheck Mugadza was born on 17 July 1966, in Buhera, Zimbabwe. He grew up in a family of three children and was raised by his parents, who were both farmers.

=== Education ===
- Bachelor of Laws degree, University of Zimbabwe
- Master's in Peace and Governance, Africa University

==== Professional affiliations ====
- Senior Partner, Muvingi & Mugadza Legal Practitioners

=== Career ===
Mugadza started his career as a lawyer and later became a politician. He joined the ZANU PF party and rose through the ranks, serving in various positions including:

- Secretary for Legal Affairs, ZANU PF Manicaland Province
- Secretary for Finance, ZANU PF Manicaland Province
- Acting Secretary for Administration, ZANU PF Manicaland Province
- Member of Parliament, Mutasa South Constituency (2022–present)
- Provincial Affairs Minister, Manicaland (2023–present)

== Achievements ==
- Improved access to healthcare and education in Manicaland constituency
- Supported agricultural development and empowered local farmers
- Advocated for women's rights and gender equality
- Promoted youth empowerment and entrepreneurship

== Personal life ==
Mugadza is married and has four children. He is a member of the Roman Catholic Church.

== Allegations ==
Mugadza has been accused of corruption and abuse of office, including allegations of embezzling funds meant for constituency development projects. However, he has denied all allegations and has not been convicted of any wrongdoing.
