= Torerayi Moyo =

Zimbabwean politician

The Honourable Torerayi Moyo MP

Minister of Primary and Secondary Education
- Incumbent
- Assumed office 12 September 2023
- President: Emmerson Mnangagwa
- Deputy: Angeline Gata
- Preceded by: Evelyn Ndlovu

Member of Parliament for Gokwe Chireya
- Incumbent
- Assumed office 26 August 2018
- President: Emmerson Mnangagwa
- Preceded by: Cephas Sindi
- Constituency: Gokwe Chireya
- Majority: 8,356 (46.4%)

Personal details
- Party: ZANU-PF
- Education: University of Zimbabwe

Torerayi Moyo is a Zimbabwean politician. He is the current Minister of Primary and Secondary Education of Zimbabwe and a member of parliament. He is a member of ZANU–PF.
