= Musa Ncube =

Zimbabwean politician

The Hon. Musa Ncube MP

Deputy Minister of National Housing and Social Amenities
- Incumbent
- Assumed office 24 April 2024
- President: Emmerson Mnangagwa
- Minister: Soda Zhemu
- Preceded by: Yeukai Simbanegavi

Member of Parliament for Tsholotsho South
- Incumbent
- Assumed office 26 March 2022
- President: Emmerson Mnangagwa
- Preceded by: Zenzo Sibanda
- Constituency: Tsholotsho South
- Majority: 774 (4.7%)

Personal details
- Party: ZANU-PF
- Spouse: Cain Mathema (m. 1989; div. 2008)

Musa Ncube is a Zimbabwean politician, serving as the Member of Parliament for Tsholotsho South and current Deputy Minister of National Housing and Social Amenities. She was elected to the National Assembly during the 26 March 2022 by-election, following the death of Zenzo Sibanda.
