= Wedza District =

Coordinates: 18°37′S 31°34′E

Chikomba District
- second-level administrative subdivision
- Interactive map of Chikomba District
- Country: Zimbabwe
- Province: Mashonaland East

Area
  - Total: 2,560 km^{2} (990 sq mi)

Population (2022 census)
  - Total: 74,870
  - Density: 29.2/km^{2} (75.7/sq mi)
- Time zone: UTC+1 (CET)
  - Summer (DST): UTC+1 (CEST)

Wedza (or Hwedza) is a district in the province of Mashonaland East, Zimbabwe. It is located about 50 kilometres (31 mi) south of Marondera, and 127 kilometres (79 mi) south of Harare. The area was sparsely inhabited by the Mbire people of the Soko Clan as early inhabitants who mined iron in the Hwedza hills during the 9th-12th centuries which means "a place of wealth". A village of Wedza was established in 1910 by Colonial administration. Gold, beryl, nickel, tungsten and grayite were mined in the hills around the village but deposits were too small to make further commercial mining viable.

== Etymology ==
The word Wedza literally translates to "the lighting of the sun", or "twilight", and myth has it that the word is derived from the location of the ancient town, which was found on the other side of a deep forest. Pre-Colonial era Wedza was called Mbire. It was a very important area because of the iron which was mined in the Wedza mountain. The iron was important for both wealth and ceremonial purposes. The iron was fashioned into hoes, axes and other farming implements which people especially young man in need of a wife required. A hoe especially was central part of the marriage ceremony. A young man could not obtain a wife if he could not present his future mother-in-law with one during the roora ceremony.

== Geography ==
Hwedza is under chief Svosve and Chief Ruzane is well connected to other towns by tarred roads. Rusunzwe and Gandamasungo, the famous Wedza mountain range, are some of the most outstanding geographical features in Wedza. Hwedza District boundaries are the Save River on the west and Ruzave (Ruzawi) river on the east. Other rivers include Nyamidzi, Mhare, Nyamhembe and Chineyi. Hwedza is climatically divided into two halves, upper Hwedza from St Barnabas Chisasike to Hwedza center onwards which is cooler and has average to high rainfall; and lower Hwedza which is from Mukamba through Goneso and Zviyambe East and West small scale farming area (formerly known as purchase areas) which experiences warmer to hot temperatures and lower rainfall. Even the crops grown in the two parts differ significantly, cotton and sorghum/millet do better in lower Hwedza, while in upper Hwedza the same crops would not yield much.

Hwedza is also known for mazhanje/mashuku (Uapaca kirkiana) (a wild fruit harvested between late October into early December).

== Services and transportation ==
Wedza is accessible by road from Harare but the roads have depreciated in quality as a result of the 'Land Reform Policy' which saw industry severely disrupted. Bus companies have stopped services the remote parts such as the areas of Chigondo, St Leoba, and Zana Resettlement. However, daily services are run by several minibus operators to the city of Harare and Marondera, usually terminating at Murambinda.

The service centre (growth point) consists of a Spar supermarket, a post office, a filling station, several drinking places and is served by reliable bus services by Chawasarira, Manica, Matemba, Mushandira/Matemai as well as several minibus operators. An airstrip capable of landing small aircraft is also present.

There is a clinic as well as a Hospital at Mt St Marys. Hwedza is also on the national electricity grid. The main crop grown is maize for both subsistence and sale.

== Economy ==
The core business of Wedza was farming with its aligned service industries until disruptions to commercial agriculture and ranching in the area. Land Reform Project' 2000 of Zimbabwe saw white Zimbabwean farmers being displaced and more black farmers moving onto the land.

=== Agriculture ===
Wedza's unique location offers a vast array of agricultural opportunity. Areas along Watershed Road leading into Wedza from Harare were known for tobacco, maize and paprika production during the warm wet season (October to March). The more southerly part of the district encompassing areas of Makarara, Zviyambe and leading into Dorowa were once a bastion of cotton farming and cattle ranching before 2000. The more central part of the district has a history of erratic rain and as such, villages located in this part of the district are often in need of food aid as they often fail to reap meaningful harvests with the unpredictable rainfall patterns.

- Currently tobacco is the most dominant field crop grown, followed by groundnuts which is grown in every homestead especially in Zviyambe area. The tobacco production has expanded significantly in Zviyambe and resettlement areas giving an average output of 1300 kg / ha. The 2013 tobacco selling season has showed that most farmers have improved in terms of output and quality.

== Politics ==
Upper Wedza which mainly consists of commercial farms, good rainfall, a Hospital and at least 3 good boarding schools namely Chemhanza, Mt St Marys Rusunzwe and St Annes Goto : The area was seized from the Mbire people by the original white settler farmers most of whom had been gold panners and fortune hunters tricked by Cecil John Rhodes and Rudd into settling as farmers under the promise of finding gold. Failing to find the gold they had been promised they were encouraged to take whatever land they needed in what areas suited them and become farmers. Through this exercise they drove away the local Mbire people into villages in lower Wedza where the rain is erratic and the soil significantly poor. Through this exercise many were driven off their ancestral lands living behind family shrines and graves through the Tribal Trust lands Act. The first Chimurenga which was won by the Rhodesian forces paved way to this exercise. The Second Chimurenga and its aftermath has for years inclined the popular vote from the district towards ZANU PF. However, despite the socio-economic challenges Wedza has continued to be a stronghold of ZANU-PF.

== Education ==
Notable schools from the Wedza area are St Annes Goto (Anglican), Mt St Marys (Catholic), Chemhanza (Methodist) and Hwedza High School (government). Other institutions include Matsine, Chigwedere, Gumbonzvanda, St Margaret's Chigondo, Nhumwa, St Leoba's, Holy Spirit Ruzane, Anderson Mutiweshiri, Makanda, Barnabas, St Augustine Chitida and Rambanapasito name but a few.

Several schools are found within the district:

- Primary Schools
  - St Johns Maninga Primary School
  - St Barnabas Primary School
  - Chimimba Primary School
  - chinyonga primary school
  - makurumure primary school
  - St Thomas Aquinas Primary School
  - St Margaret's Chigondo Primary School
  - St Matthias Ruswa Primary School
  - St Joseph's Primary School
  - Gumbonzvanda Primary School
  - St Pauls Primary School
  - St Stephen's Makurumure primary school
  - St John's Matsvai Primary School
  - Chemhanza Primary School
  - Mt St Mary's (Rusunzwe) Primary School
  - Payarira Primary School
  - Sengezi Primary School
  - Magamba Primary School
  - Mukondwa Primary School
  - Gandamasungo Primary School
  - Rambanapasi Primary School
  - St Johns Matsvai Primary School
  - Mutupwizana Primary School
  - Holy Spirit Ruzane School
  - St Mark's Goneso Primary School
  - St Mark's Musavadye Primary School
  - St Augustine Chitida
- Secondary Schools
  - St Barnabas (Madzimbabwe) Secondary School
  - St Mathias Ruswa Secondary School
  - Wedza High School
  - Mt St Mary's High School
  - St Augustine Chitida
  - Saint Thomas Aquinas Secondary
  - Mukondwa Secondary School
  - St Annes Goto High School
  - Chemhanza High School
  - Zana Secondary School
  - Rambanapasi Secondary School
  - Magamba Secondary School
  - Matsine Secondary School
  - Holy Spirit Ruzane School
  - St Mary's Makanda Secondary School
  - Gumbonzvanda High School
  - St Pauls Sango Secondary School

== Tourism ==
The location of Imire Game Park within the district makes it a good location for a safari trip. The game park has for years taken part in the Rhinoceros breeding programme. However of late poachers have killed several of the animals including breeding cows.

== Notable people ==
- Constantino Chiwenga
- Nolbert Kunonga
- Tinashe Mutarisi
- General Constantino Chiwenga – Zimbabwe 1st Vice President
- George Tawengwa – nationalist, businessman
- Paul Tangi Mhova Mkondo – nationalist, part of the first group of Gonakudzingwa restriction camp political prisoners, pioneer indigenous businessman and entrepreneur, pioneer indigenous commercial farmer, philanthropist and conservationist
- Sunday Chidzambwa – former Warriors coach, Zifa chairman
