= Watson Khupe =

Zimbabwean politician (1962/1963 – 2022)

Member of the Senate of Zimbabwe for Bulawayo
- In office 30 July 2018 – 6 May 2022

Personal details
- Born: 1962 or 1963 Matabeleland, Rhodesia and Nyasaland
- Died: 17 July 2022 (aged 59) Bulawayo, Zimbabwe
- Resting place: Lady Stanley Cemetery
- Party: ZANU–PF
- Spouse: Takla Khupe
- Education: National University of Science and Technology, Zimbabwe (MBA)

Watson Khupe (1962/1963 – 17 July 2022) was a Zimbabwean disability activist and politician who served in the Senate of Zimbabwe from 2018 to 2022 as a member of the Zimbabwe African National Union – Patriotic Front. Khupe represented a specially allotted constituency for people with disabilities.

== Biography ==
Khupe, an ethnic Kalanga, was born in 1962 or 1963 in Matabeleland, then part of Rhodesia and Nyasaland. Khupe attended the National University of Science and Technology, where he received a Master of Business Administration degree.

Khupe was a staunch advocate for disability rights. Khupe has muscular dystrophy and had served as the chairman of the Disabled People's Organization, the National Disability Board, and the Federation of Organizations of Disabled People in Zimbabwe. In 1990, Khupe founded the Muscular Dystrophy Association of Zimbabwe, and from 2011 to 2015, he served as the organization's project manager. In 2010, he was the co-author of a report sponsored by the government of the United Kingdom regarding disability in Zimbabwe. Khupe was a representative for people with disabilities during the drafting of the 2013 Constitution of Zimbabwe.

In the 2018 Zimbabwean general election, Khupe was elected to the Senate of Zimbabwe, representing people with disabilities as a member of the Zimbabwe African National Union – Patriotic Front. This is a specially allotted constituency, in which the one male and one female senator are elected by an electoral college open to delegates from registered disabilities organizations. This pair of senators are able to be recalled by the same electoral college. Khupe served in this constituency alongside Rejoice Timire, until her death in 2021; he then served with Timire's successor Nasper Manyau. On 6 May 2022, the National Council of Disabled Persons of Zimbabwe (NCDPZ) recalled Khupe from the Senate, as a result of his association with a group that broke away from the NCDPZ and for his appointment of a member to the National Disability Board without receiving approval from the NCDPZ.

Khupe advocated for expanding access to braille reading material, urging companies to employ people with disabilities, and an increased usage of sign language in schools. Khupe also challenged a government bill which would disperse funds to people with disabilities via mobile networks, with Khupe stating that some people with disabilities "live in areas without mobile network so the idea of sending the cushioning funds through mobile services is not possible because most of them would not receive the funds"; Khupe instead argued for a system wherein local officials, like councilors and tribal chiefs, would be responsible for ensuring the funds are dispersed. Khupe later criticized the government for cutting COVID-19 pandemic relief funds to local communities. Khupe also supported a government program to assist people with disabilities who were unable to pay for medication.

Khupe lived in Thorngrove, a neighborhood of Bulawayo. Khupe died on 17 July 2022 at Mater Dei Hospital in Bulawayo from complications caused by his muscular dystrophy. He is buried in Lady Stanley Cemetery, which is reserved for distinguished residents of Bulawayo.
