= Itayi Ndudzo =

Zimbabwean politician

The Honourable Itayi Ndudzo MP

Minister of State for Provincial Affairs and Devolution for Mashonaland East
- Incumbent
- Assumed office 11 February 2025
- President: Emmerson Mnangagwa
- Preceded by: Aplonia Munzverengwi

Member of Parliament for Wedza North
- Incumbent
- Assumed office 4 September 2023
- President: Emmerson Mnangagwa
- Preceded by: Musabayana David
- Constituency: Wedza North
- Majority: 13,051 (51.9%)

Personal details
- Party: ZANU-PF

Itayi Ndudzo is a Zimbabwean politician. He is the current Minister of State for Provincial Affairs and Devolution for Mashonaland East and a member of parliament. He is a member of ZANU–PF.
