= Daniel Molokele =

Zimbabwean lawyer, activist (born 1975)

- Born: Fortune Mguni; 31 January 1975 (age 51); Bulawayo, Rhodesia
- Education: University of Zimbabwe

Daniel Fortune Molokele (b. Fortune Mguni on 31 January 1975 in Wankie, Rhodesia) is a Zimbabwean pro-democracy human rights lawyer well known for his fight for democracy. He currently resides in Hwange, Zimbabwe

== Life background ==
Molokele was born Friday 31 January 1975 at the Wankie Colliery Hospital in the town of Hwange, in the north-western part of Zimbabwe.

His father's name was Godfrey Majahana Mguni. He was a career trade unionist and a well-known community leader in Hwange. Among his accomplishments was being elected as the Workers Committee Chairperson between 1979 and 1990. He was also a key leader of both the Associated Mineworkers Union of Zimbabwe and the Zimbabwe Congress of Trade Unions. He died on 28 September 2003.

Molokele's mother, Jane Mpofu, was a career educator specializing in pre-school education. She has since retired and is now based at Bulawayo.

== Soccer and politics history in Molokele’s family ==
His father used to play in the amateur football league known as the Wankie Football Association. (WAFA) He was also the chairperson for a team that played under the WAFA league known as the Zulu Royals Football Club. Perhaps not to be outdone by his dad, Molokele's younger brother also set up his own successful junior soccer team known as Skyline Football Club. The team used to play under the Lwendulu Football Association (LIFA) during the latter part of the 1980s.

Politically, both of Molokele's parents were active local leaders for the Zimbabwe African People's Union (ZAPU) during his entire childhood years.

Molokele spent all his childhood years at No.1 Colliery (Lwendulu Village). His family stayed at several homes in Hwange that included P63, O21, L24 and M28. Molokele did all his seven years of primary education at the St Ignatius primary school between 1982 and 1988.

In 1989, he was enrolled at a boarding school (Ingwenya Mission) at Ntabazinduna, just outside Bulawayo where he did his studies from Form 1 to 4 at John Tallach secondary school till 1992. Between 1993 and 1994, he was enrolled at another boarding school in Gweru where he did his A level studies at Fletcher High School.

In March 1995, he was admitted at the University of Zimbabwe (UZ) law faculty where he completed his Bachelor of Laws honours degree in May 1999.

Molokele was an activist from the time he arrived at the UZ. He was actively involved in various campus platforms such as the Christian Union, Matabeleland Development Society and of course in the mainstream student politics. In this regard, Molokele became one of the most successful student political leaders in the history of Zimbabwe. He was a student leader at the University of Zimbabwe in Harare between 1995 and 1999.

During the said period, he contested in three different elections in which he was elected as the Secretary General, Vice President and then finally as the President of the Students Union.

He was also involved in the national and international student politics. Specifically, he was elected as the Vice President of the Zimbabwe National Students Union (ZINASU) from 1997 to 1999. He also participated in different programmes and conferences of the Southern African Students Union (SASU) from 1997 to 1999.

He was one of the prominent student leaders that were instrumental in the setting up of the constitutional movement of Zimbabwe in 1997, the National Constitutional Assembly. (NCA) He was also at the forefront in the role that was played by the students' movement in the setting up of the Movement for Democratic Change (MDC) in 1999.

Unlike his peers, the late Learnmore Jongwe, Job Sikhala and Tafadzwa Musekiwa, among others, he opted not to be a Member of Parliament in 2000 and chose to work with the broader civil society movement initially in Zimbabwe before focusing at South Africa and Africa at large.

After his university years, Molokele relocated to Bulawayo where he initially worked as a legal practitioner at Ben Baron and Partners. He was soon lured to full-time activism when he was appointed as the Bulawayo regional programme officer for the National Constitutional Assembly (NCA). Afterwards he also worked as the Zimbabwe southern regional programme officer for the local chapter of Transparency International (TIZ).

During his Bulawayo years from June 1999 to December 2003, Molokele was actively involved in the setting up of various organisations such as the Christian Legal Society (CLS), Gospel Music Association (GMA) and the Christian Leadership Forum (CLF), Bulawayo Agenda, among others.

Molokele relocated from Bulawayo to Johannesburg in January 2004. Prior to that, Molokele had changed his legal name from Fortune Mguni to Fortune Daniel Molokela-Tsiye in 2000, after a personal quest to reclaim his original family identity. His father's family only started using the Mguni surname after the death of his grandfather in the early 1970s. The process culminated in him being re-united with his father's original people, the Molokele clan in Mafikeng, South Africa, in September 2004.

During his early years in South Africa, Molokele continued his activism and was actively involved with various organisations and platforms. These included the Peace and Democracy Project (PDP), Zimbabwe Diaspora CSOs Forum, Zimbabwe Diaspora Development Chamber (ZDDC) and the Global Zimbabwe Forum. (GZF) In fact, it was due to his active role at the GZF that he was seconded to set up its office at Geneva in Switzerland between May and December 2008.

Molokele has also been employed by various other organisations in South Africa over the years. These include among others, Zimonline Media Trust, Doctors without Borders (MSF), Southern Africa Editors Forum (SAEF), World AIDS Campaign International (WACI), Southern African Regional Programme on Access to Medicines and Diagnostics (SAPAM) and Accountability International (AI)

He was based at Cape Town between May 2009 and April 2011 where he was instrumental in the mobilisation of the Zimbabwean community there under the local chapter of the GZF.

In recent years, Molokele has been actively involved with such platforms as the Zimbabwe Diaspora Support Initiative (ZDESI), Learnmore and Rutendo Jongwe Memorial trust, Friends of Nora Tapiwa, Highlanders FC Bosso South Africa branch and also the Southern Africa regional offices for the Crisis in Zimbabwe Coalition.

Molokele has also been actively involved with the local South Africa civil society. In particular, he has sat in the national boards for such organisations as Transparency International South Africa, Amnesty International South Africa and MISA-South Africa. He has also been an active member of the South African Institute of International Affairs, Freedom of Expression Institute of South Africa and the Gender Media Network of Southern Africa.

== Career in writing ==
Molokele has always regarded himself as a creative writer. He has over the years written several unpublished works and manuscripts ranging from biographies, fictional stories, poetry and movie scripts. Added to that, he has also written regularly in various media forums in South Africa such as the Mail & Guardian and Zimonline.

In particular, he has written personal column articles in such publications as Moto magazine, NewZimbabwe.com and The Zimbabwean.

Molokele is an active Christian. In this regard he has been also actively involved in the setting up of both the Johannesburg and Cape Town branches of the Victory Fellowship Church that is originally from Bulawayo. He now attends the His People Church at Johannesburg.

Molokele has also managed to further his studies and now holds a master's in human rights litigation degree from the University of South Africa and also a master's in business administration from the African Leadership University

He was until the end of May 2014 based at Rosebank at Johannesburg where he was working as the Civil Society Partnerships Programme Manager for the Southern Africa Regional Programme on Access to Medicines and Diagnostics (SARPAM)

From July 2014 to Nov 2016 he worked at AIDS Accountability International (AAI).

During the early part of 2017, Molokele relocated to his hometown of Whange in Zimbabwe.

In July 2018 he was elected as the Member of Parliament for Whange Central constituency as a candidate of the MDC Alliance

Molokele now serves as the Chairperson of the Parliamentary Committee for Higher and Tertiary Education, Innovation, Science and Technology Development

In June 2019, Molokele was appointed as the Spokesperson or Secretary for Communications under the MDC Alliance that is led by President Advocate Nelson Chamisa.

== Family ==
He has also been married to a supportive partner, Doctor Samukeliso Dube since November 2001 and they have a daughter called Matilda-Jane, who was born on 1 April 2006.
