= David Musabayana =

Zimbabwean politician

Provincial Governor Minister for Mashonaland East

Personal details
- Party: ZANU–PF

David Musabayana is a Zimbabwean politician. He served as a Provincial Governor Minister for Mashonaland East of Zimbabwe, as well as a member of parliament. He is a member of ZANU–PF.
