= National Patriotic Front (Zimbabwe) =

Political party in Zimbabwe

- Abbreviation: NPF
- Spokesman: Jealousy Mawarire
- Founder: Ambrose Mutinhiri
- Founded: December 7, 2017
- Colours: Black
- Slogan: You and I have work to do (English); Iwe Neni Tinebasa (Shona); Umsebenzi lo Umkhulu (Northern Ndebele)

The National Patriotic Front (NPF) is a Zimbabwean political party founded on 19 November 2017 by leaders of the expelled G40 faction of the ZANU-PF party, which included the exiled Jonathan Moyo, Patrick Zhuwao and Saviour Kasukuwere.

The party denounced the military takeover in November 2017, known as Operation Restore Legacy, that led to President Robert Mugabe's resignation.

In March 2018, retired Brigadier Ambrose Mutinhiri resigned from parliament and left the ZANU-PF to become president of the NPF, and shortly thereafter Ambrose Mutinhiri was announced as the party's presidential candidate for the 2018 general elections.

In late May 2018 a video of Jonathan Moyo and Patrick Zhuwawo discussing the NPF's internal problems was live-streamed online. In the video the two former G40 leaders alleged the possible abuse of party funds by its spokesperson Jealousy Mawarire and party president Ambrose Mutinhiri. Mawarire reacted by calling Moyo a "bloody liar and petty thief."

On 8 June 2018 the party's national chairperson Eunice Sandi Moyo fired Ambrose Mutinhiri as party president. This led to a split in the party. The faction of NPF led by Moyo later endorsed the MDC Alliance's leader Nelson Chamisa for president whereas Ambrose Mutinhiri ran as a candidate for the faction under his leadership, but got less than 1% of the vote. The faction led by Eunice Sandi Moyo is closely aligned with the Mugabe family, it won a seat in the July 2018 general election when Masango Matambanadzo won the Kwekwe Central constituency, for which he had represented the ZANU-PF until leaving the party earlier the same year.
