= Masango Matambanadzo =

Zimbabwean politician (1964–2020)

Masango "Blackman" Matambanadzo (26 February 1964 – 28 July 2020) was a Zimbabwean politician who served as MP for Kwekwe Central in the National Assembly from 2013 until his death in 2020. Elected in 2013 as a member of ZANU-PF, Matambanadzo was expelled from the party on charges of being part of the G40 faction. He joined the National Patriotic Front with other G40 members and was re-elected in 2018.
