= Ellen Gwaradzimba =

Zimbabwean politician (1960–2021)

- Born: 25 December 1960; Gutu District
- Died: 15 January 2021 (aged 60)
- Education: Nachingwea Military Academy, Tanzania

Ellen Gwaradzimba (née Munyoro; 25 December 1960 – 15 January 2021) was a Zimbabwean politician.

She served as a member of the Senate of Zimbabwe and as Minister of State for Provincial Affairs for the Province of Manicaland from 2018 until her death in 2021.

Gwaradzimba died on January 15, 2021, a victim of COVID-19 during the COVID-19 pandemic in Zimbabwe, in a private hospital in Harare. Gwaradzimba was posthumously declared a National Hero by President Emmerson Mnangagwa.

== Biography ==
Ellen was born in the Gutu district in 1960, She undertook her Primary and Secondary School in Masvingo. She joined the liberation struggle at 16 and joined the Nachingwea Military Academy in Tanzania where she majored in guerrilla.

== Death ==
She died on 15 January 2021 as a result of COVID.
