= Blessing Chebundo =

Zimbabwean politician (born 1958)

Secretary MDC Secretary for Health
- In office 2001–2005

Member of the Zimbabwe Parliament for Kwekwe
- In office 2000–2013

Personal details
- Born: 8 October 1958 (age 68) Rhodesia
- Party: ZANU-PF
- Other political affiliations: Movement for Democratic Change (1999-2021)

Blessing Chebundo (born 8 October 1958) is a Zimbabwean politician, a member of parliament and a leading figure in the opposition Movement for Democratic Change (MDC). He rose to fame by defeating Emmerson Mnangagwa in a contest to represent Kwekwe constituency in the parliament of Zimbabwe in the 2000 parliamentary election. Mnangagwa, a heavyweight in ZANU-PF, was predicted to easily win the constituency, but Chebundo won the seat despite threats to his life. As an incumbent, he again defeated Mnangagwa and was re-elected in the March 2005 parliamentary election.

== Background ==
Chebundo is a founder member of the Movement for Democratic Change, a political party that was formed in September 1999. He has represented Kwekwe constituency in the Parliament of Zimbabwe since the watershed elections of 2000. Before the formation of the MDC, Chebundo had been the vice-chairman of the Zimbabwe Congress of Trade Unions (ZCTU) for the Central Region; he was also national treasurer of the Zimbabwe Chemical & Allied Workers Union from 1990 to 2000. He served as the MDC's secretary of health from 2001 to 2005 and has been a member of its National Executive Committee since 2006.

== MDC split ==
Chebundo initially joined the 'rebels', led by Welshman Ncube, that broke away from the MDC. However, Chebundo eventually rejoined the main MDC, citing the wishes of the members of his constituency in Kwekwe.

== Defecting to Zanu PF ==
On 24 February 2021 Chebundo left MDC-T which was led by Douglas Mwonzora at the time to join ZANU-PF.

== See also ==
- Morgan Tsvangirai
- Arthur Mutambara
