= Oppah Muchinguri-Kashiri =

Zimbabwean politician (born 1958)

The Honourable Oppah Muchinguri-Kashiri
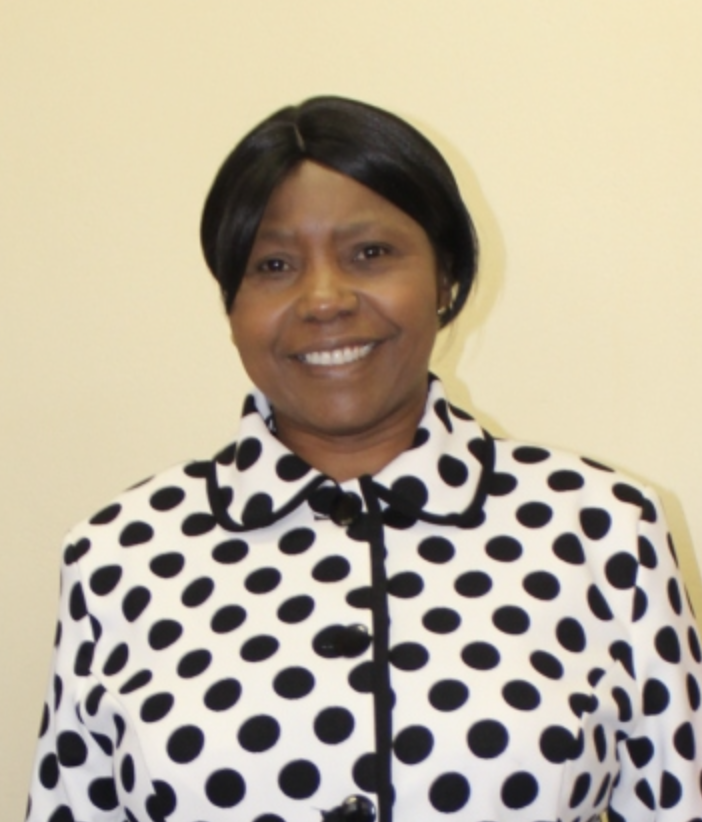
- Muchinguri in 2015

Minister of Defence
- Incumbent
- Assumed office 11 September 2018
- President: Emmerson Mnangagwa
- Deputy: Levi Mayihlome
- Preceded by: Constantino Chiwenga

Minister of Environment, Water and Climate
- In office 23 July 2015 – 11 September 2018
- President: Robert Mugabe; Emmerson Mnangagwa

Minister of Higher and Tertiary Education, Science and Technology Development
- In office December 2014 – 23 July 2015
- President: Robert Mugabe
- Preceded by: Olivia Muchena
- Succeeded by: Jonathan Moyo

Minister of Women's Affairs, Gender and Community Development
- In office 2005–2009
- President: Robert Mugabe
- Preceded by: Position created
- Succeeded by: Olivia Muchena

Personal details
- Born: 14 December 1958 (age 67) Southern Rhodesia
- Party: ZANU-PF
- Spouse(s): Anthony Kashiri (m. 2015); Tapiwa Rushesha (div. 1990)
- Children: 2
- Education: University of Zimbabwe
- Alma mater: University of Zimbabwe
- Occupation: Politician

Oppah Chamu Zvipange Muchinguri-Kashiri (born 14 December 1958) is a Zimbabwean politician who serves as minister of defence in the cabinet of Zimbabwe since 2018. She has also served as Minister of Higher Education and Minister of Women's Affairs. Muchinguri ran as the ZANU-PF candidate for Mutasa Central constituency in the March 2008 parliamentary election, but was defeated by Trevor Saruwaka of the Movement for Democratic Change – Tsvangirai. According to official results, Muchinguri received 4,764 votes against 9,228 votes for Saruwaka.

The Herald reported on 3 January 2009, that Muchinguri had been dismissed from the Cabinet earlier in the week, along with 11 other ministers, because she no longer held any seat in Parliament.

She was re-appointed to cabinet in 2014 following the dismissal of former Vice-President Joice Mujuru and several of her allies, in December 2014. In 2015 she was moved to the Ministry of Environment, Water and Climate in a cabinet reshuffle. On 27 November 2017, Mugabe's successor Emmerson Mnangagwa dissolved the cabinet.

She was appointed as the Minister of Environment, Water and Climate again on 30 November 2017. She was later appointed Minister of Defence in September 2018.

She was placed on the United States sanctions list in 2003. In 2020 she claimed that the COVID-19 pandemic was God's punishment on the countries (USA etc.) that "suffocate" Zimbabwe by sanctions.

In January 2021 Muchinguri was condemned by public health experts in Zimbabwe after accusing China of "botched experiments" that were responsible for the outbreak of the coronavirus pandemic in the world after Zimbabwe lost 2 cabinet ministers.
