= Mashonaland East Province =

Coordinates: 17°30′S 32°00′E

Mashonaland East: Dunhu reMashonaland East (Shona); Isabelo seMashonaland East (Northern Ndebele)
- Province
- Mashonaland East, Province of Zimbabwe
- Country: Zimbabwe
- Capital: Marondera

Government
  - Type: Provincial Government
  - Minister of State for Provincial Affairs: Itayi Ndudzo (ZANU-PF)

Area
  - Total: 32,230 km^{2} (12,440 sq mi)

Population (2022 census)
  - Total: 1,731,173
  - Density: 53.71/km^{2} (139.1/sq mi)
- HDI (2018): 0.539 low · 7th

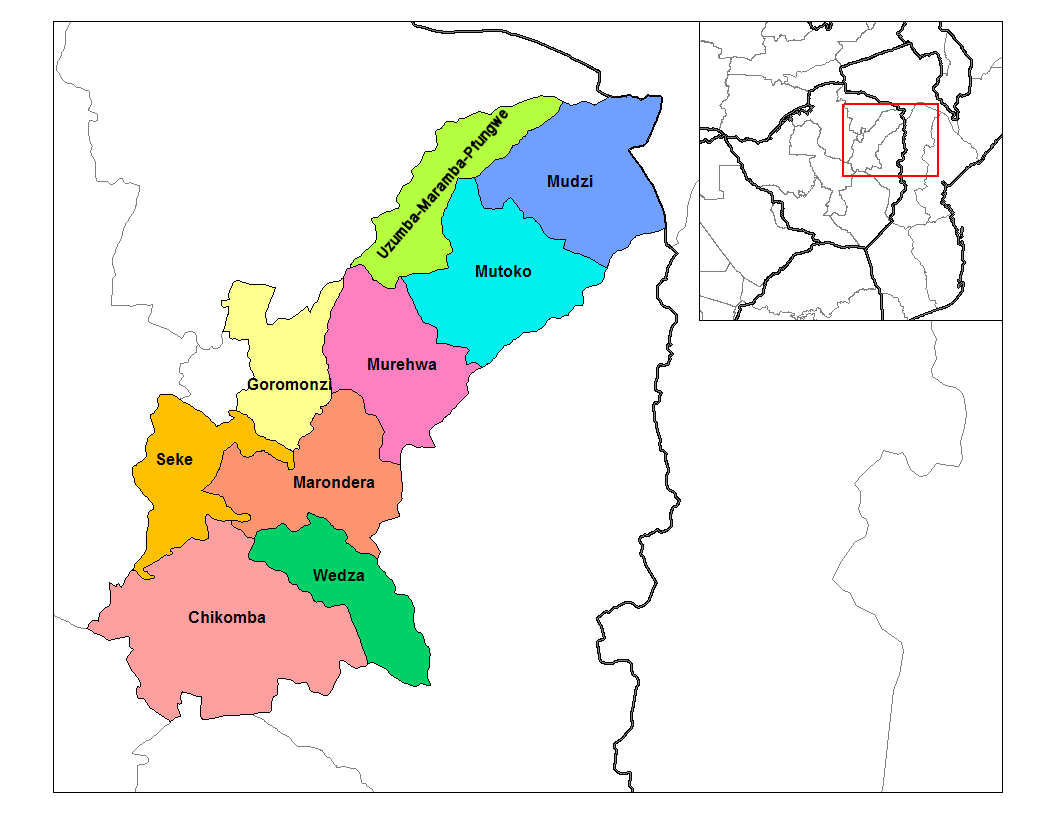
Districts of Mashonaland East

Constituencies

Mashonaland East, informally Mash East, is a province of Zimbabwe. It has an area of 32,230 km^{2} and a population of approximately 1.73 million (2022). Marondera is the capital of the province.

== Demographics ==
Census	Population
2002	1,127,413
2012	1,344,955
2022	1,731,173

The province has a history of African migrants from neigboouring countries such as Mozambique and Malawi. Notable ethnic groups in the province are the Shonas, Ndebele, Nyanja, Tumbuka and other groups. Several languages are spoken in different districts such as Shona, Nyanja, Ndebele, Chitumbuka, and Chibarwe, among others.

== Geography ==
=== Districts ===
Mashonaland East is divided into the following nine districts:

- Chikomba
- Goromonzi
- Marondera
- Mudzi
- Murehwa (Mrehwa)
- Mutoko
- Seke
- Uzumba-Maramba-Pfungwe (UMP)
- Wedza (Hwedza)

== See also ==
- Provinces of Zimbabwe
- Districts of Zimbabwe
