= 2008–2009 Zimbabwean political negotiations =

Leaders in the Zimbabwean Political Negotiations
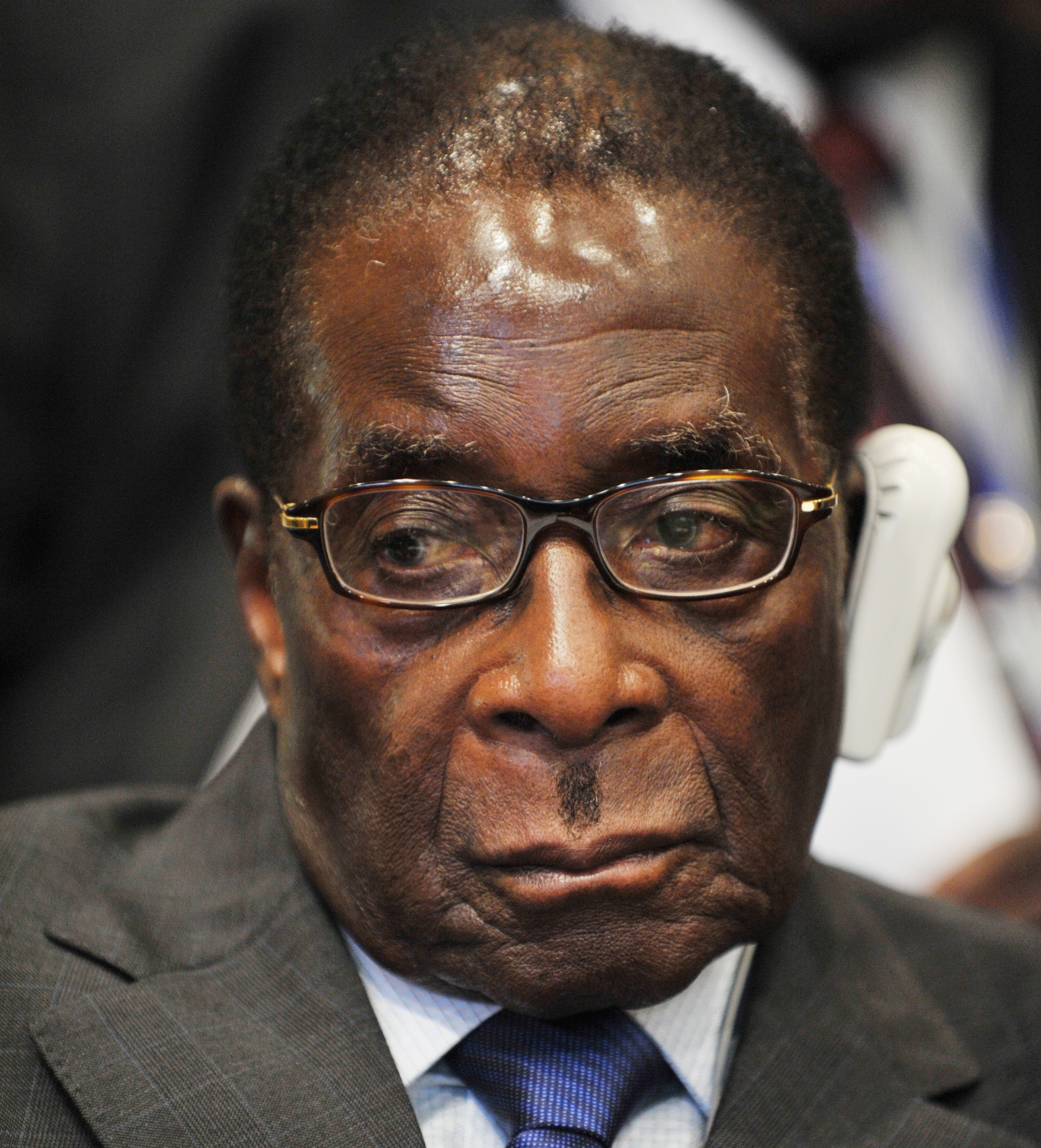
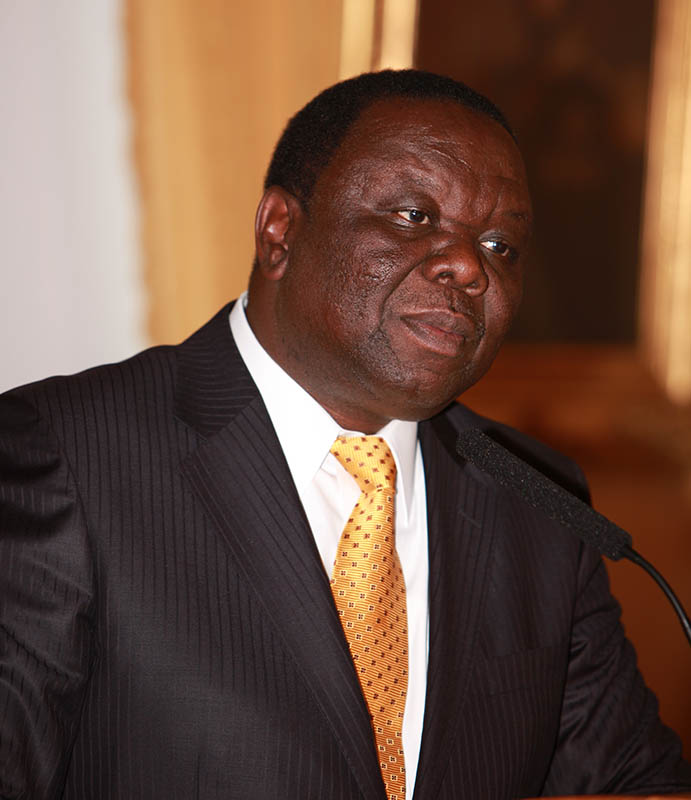
(left to right) President Robert Mugabe (leader of the Zimbabwe African National Union – Patriotic Front), Prime Minister Morgan Tsvangarai (leader of the Movement for Democratic Change) They are the main political leaders in the political negotiations in Zimbabwe.

The 2008–2009 Zimbabwean political negotiations between the opposition Movement for Democratic Change (led by Morgan Tsvangirai), its small splinter group, the Movement for Democratic Change – Mutambara (led by Arthur Mutambara), and the ruling Zimbabwe African National Union – Patriotic Front (led by Robert Mugabe) were intended to negotiate an end to the partisan violence and human rights violations in Zimbabwe and create a framework for a power-sharing executive government between the two parties. These negotiations followed the 2008 presidential election, in which Mugabe was controversially re-elected, as well as the 2008 parliamentary election, in which the MDC won a majority in the House of Assembly.

Preliminary talks to set up conditions for official negotiations began between leading negotiators from both parties on 10 July, and on 22 July, the three party leaders met for the first time in Harare to express their support for a negotiated settlement of disputes arising out of the presidential and parliamentary elections. Negotiations between the parties officially began on 25 July in Pretoria, mediated by South African President Thabo Mbeki. A final deal was reached on 11 September 2008, providing for Mugabe to remain president while Tsvangirai would become prime minister. The deal was signed on 15 September.

== Details of the talks ==
=== Preliminary negotiations ===
Mbeki met with Mugabe on 5 July; Arthur Mutambara, Welshman Ncube, and Priscilla Misihairabwi-Mushonga of the MDC-Mutambara group also participated in the discussions. Although Tsvangirai's MDC organisation was not invited to participate, it declined to do so, reiterating its refusal to recognise Mugabe as president and saying that discussions should take place only in the presence of an AU-appointed mediator. Mbeki nevertheless expressed hopes that Tsvangirai's party would participate. Patrick Chinamasa stressed that the government was committed to dialogue with both MDC groupings, but said that Tsvangirai had committed "an act of utter disrespect" by failing to appear at the talks. Mutambara also stated that the involvement of all parties was necessary.

Talks between the parties began in Pretoria on 10 July. ZANU-PF and both MDC groupings were present for the talks, although Tsvangirai said that his group's delegation, led by Biti, was present to explain its conditions for negotiations—which included an end to the violence, the release of MDC prisoners, and the appointment of an AU envoy— not to actually participate in negotiations. Chamisa described the discussions as merely "talks about whether to have talks, really just a consultation". ZANU-PF was represented in the talks by Chinamasa and Goche.

In a report from the Human Sciences Research Council, a policy group in South Africa, that was released on 10 July, Peter Kagwanja wrote that violence perpetrated against ZANU-PF by MDC supporters, which he described as having previously been spontaneous, was becoming more organised, and he warned that this increased the possibility of a civil war. Chamisa, however, denied that the MDC had been responsible for any violence.

On 11 July, the MDC said that Gift Mutsvungunu, a party official, had been found dead near Harare on the previous day; his body was said to be burned and his eyes gouged out. The MDC suspected the security forces of responsibility for this killing, and the party said that its total number of dead during the violence had reached 113. Chamisa said on 13 July that no agreement had been reached and that the two sides "still have to clear the course for meaningful talks". According to Chamisa, violence against MDC members and supporters was continuing, and he said that it was "difficult to engage in meaningful dialogue" under the circumstances. Zimbabwe's Sunday Mail, however, reported on the same day that an agreement had been reached on a "working framework" for talks.

14 MDC activists, who were being held on charges of violence, were acquitted and released on 14 July, according to the MDC. This followed the death on the same day of a police officer who was the key witness against the activists. On 15 July, church leaders in Zimbabwe said that the "will of the people of Zimbabwe was not given authentic expression during these elections" due to the violence, and they expressed willingness to assist in making arrangements for the formation of a national unity government.

Mugabe launched a food subsidy programme on 16 July; this programme, involving coupons for food, was designed to counter continually rising inflation and what Mugabe described as "unjust price increases" by private businesses. He also accused the UK of seeking to control Zimbabwe's resources on this occasion. Also on 16 July, the pro-MDC Zimbabwe Congress of Trade Unions condemned the second round and urged the appointment of a prominent AU envoy to assist in mediation.

==== Agreement and Memorandum ====
Kenyan Prime Minister Raila Odinga said on 20 July that the two parties had "agreed a framework for negotiation" and that he expected this agreement to be signed later in the same week. According to Odinga, the talks that would follow this agreement would be held in Pretoria and would still be mediated by Mbeki, but with AU and UN supervision. Also on 20 July, Zimbabwe's Sunday Mail reported that any companies with Western investments would be taken over by Zimbabweans or by "companies from friendly countries, particularly those in the Far East" if they acted on Western calls to stop doing business in Zimbabwe.

ZANU-PF and both groups of the MDC signed a Memorandum of Understanding outlining a framework for talks on 21 July in Harare. Both Mugabe and Tsvangirai were present to sign the agreement; they shook hands on this occasion, and it was reportedly the first time they had met in about 10 years. According to Mbeki, who was also present, the agreement "commits the negotiating parties to an intense program of work to try and finalize negotiations as quickly as possible". Mugabe said that the aim of the talks was to "chart a new way, a new way of political interaction", while Tsvangirai described the agreement as "the first tentative step towards searching for a solution for a country that is in crisis". Under the terms of the agreement, the parties agreed to end political violence and work towards a national unity government and a new constitution; the agreement also required that the parties not use the media as a means of negotiation and set the period for negotiations at two weeks. Mbeki's spokesman Mukoni Ratshitanga subsequently said that this was not a strict limit and talks could continue after two weeks if necessary.

=== Round 1 (22 – 30 July) ===
Following the preliminary agreement, talks between ZANU-PF and the MDC reportedly began on 22 July in South Africa. Ratshitanga said on 23 July that the talks had begun at an undisclosed location, but Chinamasa said that they were to start on 24 July. The Herald reported on 24 July that negotiating teams for both parties took the same flight to South Africa on 23 July. Meanwhile, the South African newspaper Business Day reported that the two sides had already reached agreement on most of the issues, although details remained to be decided.

The Herald reported on 25 July that the ZANU-PF Politburo had decided that any agreement with the opposition must leave Mugabe in office as president and must not threaten land reform. Ratshitanga said on 26 July that the talks were "proceeding well", although he gave no details.

==== Stalling ====
On 28 July, an MDC official said that the talks had stalled due to disagreement on the question of who would lead the government; according to the official, Tsvangirai had been offered the position of vice-president, but the MDC was unwilling to accept any deal that did not place Tsvangirai at the head of the government. Speaking on 29 July, however, Mbeki said that the talks were continuing and that they were going "very well". The talks adjourned on 29 July. Mbeki said on 30 July that the talks were adjourned so that the negotiators could consult with their leaders and that they would resume on 3 August. He met with Tsvangirai in Pretoria on 29 July and with Mugabe in Harare on 30 July. For his part, Mugabe said that the talks were going well and that the negotiators were working towards a compromise.

Speaking on 30 July, Tsvangirai expressed his hope that the negotiations would result in an "honourable exit" for Mugabe; he also said that Mugabe was "just as human as every one of us", while asserting that he was "ignorant, or chooses to be in denial, as far as the violence is concerned". During a visit to Senegal in which he met with Senegalese President Abdoulaye Wade, Tsvangirai said on 31 July that he was "fairly satisfied" with the way the negotiations were proceeding, while acknowledging that some "sticking points" remained.

An explosion occurred at Harare's central police station late on 2 August, damaging it but causing no casualties. According to a police statement, the explosion was caused by a bomb planted on the building's first floor; it said that one additional bomb that had not exploded was recovered from the scene.

=== Round 2 (3 – 12 August) ===
The talks resumed on 3 August. On the same day, as part of its "Let's Talk for a Change" campaign, the MDC had an advertisement published in The Standard, in which it acknowledged that Mugabe had taken a positive step by accepting power-sharing negotiations. Ratshitanga said on the next day that the renewed negotiations were proceeding well and that the negotiating parties were not concerned about meeting the deadline, which had been set for 4 August.

A South African newspaper, The Star, reported on 5 August that an agreement was near; according to The Star, this agreement would create the post of prime minister for Tsvangirai, while Mugabe would remain in office as president, but in a ceremonial capacity. The Star also reported that MDC wanted the transitional period that followed the agreement to last for 24 to 30 months, while ZANU-PF wanted it to last for five years. The Herald reported on the same day that the parties had agreed to expand their negotiating teams. ZANU-PF and the MDC made a joint statement on 6 August calling for an end to violence.

==== Another deadlock ====
In a statement on 7 August, Mugabe said that the reports regarding a draft agreement were "utter nonsense"; he also denied reports that he was planning to meet with Tsvangirai. According to Mugabe, the talks were "going on very well", and he said that "the people of Zimbabwe shall be informed in due course". However, Mbeki went to Harare on 9 August, and Mugabe's spokesman George Charamba said that Mugabe would meet with Tsvangirai on 10 August, while reports suggested the signing of an agreement was imminent.

On 10 August, Mbeki met with Tsvangirai in Harare, then met with Mugabe. Zimbabwe's The Sunday Mail reported on the same day that "a common position" to keep Mugabe in office as president had been agreed upon. Following further negotiations at a hotel in Harare, Mugabe said when leaving the hotel on 11 August that they were "not exactly" going well, but that they would continue on the next day.

On 12 August, the power-sharing negotiations continued, with reports indicating that the MDC-T and ZANU-PF were still deadlocked. Mugabe and Mutambara (of the MDC-M) were reported to have signed an agreement on 12 August that excluded Tsvangirai, but later in the day Mbeki denied that a deal was signed between any of the three negotiating parties, stating that Tsvangirai had left the negotiations earlier in the day to reflect on them. MDC-M Secretary-General Welshman Ncube also said that no agreement had been reached.

==== SADC Summit ====
The round of talks in Harare ended on the night of 12 August. Tsvangirai expressed continued commitment to dialogue on 13 August, saying that any agreement needed to "put the people first, not leadership positions and titles"; meanwhile, Mbeki, who had left Zimbabwe, maintained that it was still "possible to conclude these negotiations quite quickly". On 14 August, when Tsvangirai went to the airport in Harare to travel to Johannesburg for a SADC summit, his emergency travel documents were confiscated by members of the Central Intelligence Organisation (his passport had previously expired and he was not able to renew it); the documents were quickly returned, however, and Tsvangirai departed for the summit. According to Charamba, Mugabe's spokesman, Tsvangirai's documents were only valid for travel to Angola, and he denied MDC claims that two other members of the MDC delegation to the summit, Biti and Eliphas Mukonoweshuro, had their passports confiscated as well. Charamba accused Tsvangirai of purposefully attempting to travel with invalid documents so that he could use the resulting incident for political gain. Meanwhile, it was announced that Ian Khama, the President of Botswana, would not attend the summit unless an agreement was reached in Zimbabwe.

On 15 August, the day before the summit, Tsvangirai spoke to a gathering of Cabinet ministers from the SADC countries. In this speech, he acknowledged that the MDC and ZANU-PF remained divided on the question of how executive powers should be allocated in the national unity government. According to Tsvangirai, the sides had agreed on leaving Mugabe in office as president and establishing a new position of prime minister for himself. Tsvangirai explained that he wanted to have strong, executive powers: as prime minister, he "must chair the Cabinet and be responsible for the formulation, execution and administration of government business including appointing and dismissing his ministers", stressing that he could not succeed in the role if he was given "responsibility without authority". Mugabe, according to Tsvangirai's proposal, would be a head of state without veto power; he would remain commander-in-chief of the military, but would act in that capacity on Tsvangirai's advice. ZANU-PF, on the other hand, favoured an agreement in which Tsvangirai would become prime minister while Mugabe would remain in charge of the Cabinet.

At the summit on 16 August, SADC leaders held talks with Mugabe and Tsvangirai. Meanwhile, Tsvangirai told The New York Times that he would only accept an agreement that gave him the executive powers necessary to properly govern the country, and he said that "it's better not to have a deal than to have a bad deal". Biti said that he thought the odds of the talks ending successfully were "fifty-fifty". The SADC summit ended on 17 August, with the two sides still unable to agree. Mbeki said that the negotiations would continue after the summit; Biti, speaking for the MDC, expressed continued commitment to dialogue, as did Zimbabwe's Minister of Information, Sikhanyiso Ndlovu. In a statement, the SADC leaders called on the parties to "conclude the negotiations as a matter of urgency to restore political stability in Zimbabwe".

=== Convening Parliament ===
The SADC leaders' statement also included the suggestion "that while negotiations are continuing, it may be necessary to convene parliament to give effect to the will of the people". On 19 August, the government announced its intention to convene Parliament in the subsequent week, five months after the parliamentary election was held. The MDC said on the same day that it did not oppose convening Parliament as long as it was not accompanied by the formation of a new Cabinet, desiring that the new Cabinet should be appointed only after the conclusion of a power-sharing agreement. On 20 August, however, the MDC took a firmer stance, declaring the move to convene Parliament to be unacceptable, with Biti stating that it would "be a clear repudiation of the Memorandum of Understanding, and an indication beyond reasonable doubt of ZANU-PF's unwillingness to continue to be part of the talks. In short convening parliament decapitates the dialogue". While on a visit to Nairobi, Tsvangirai said on 21 August that convening Parliament and appointing a Cabinet would violate the conditions of the talks, according to which each step in the process was to be taken by common consensus, and suggested that Mugabe's decision could mean he was "abandon[ing] the basis for the talks". He also referred to the need to balance the powers that would be held by the president and prime minister under a power-sharing arrangement, whereby both would possess both responsibility and authority.

Despite the MDC-T's objections, the members of Parliament were sworn in on 25 August. On the same day, an election was held for the post of Speaker of Parliament; the vote resulted in a victory for MDC-T candidate Lovemore Moyo, who received 110 out of 208 votes in a secret ballot. ZANU-PF did not present a candidate against Moyo and instead supported Paul Themba Nyathi of the MDC-M.

On 27 August, Moyo, the newly elected Speaker, said in an interview that the talks would continue. The Herald reported comments by Mugabe on 27 August in which he said that he would soon form a new government; he also said that it appeared the MDC did not want to participate in that government. According to Mugabe, the MDC "[had] been promised by the British that sanctions would be more devastating, that in six months time the government will collapse". He sharply criticised the preceding Cabinet as "the worst in history" and said that the new Cabinet would be composed of "managers". MDC-T spokesman Chamisa said that Mugabe had no mandate to form a Cabinet and that doing so would be "a recipe for disaster", urging him to wait and reach an agreement with the MDC; meanwhile, MDC-M spokesman Edwin Mushoriwa also said that his group would not participate in a government formed without an agreement.

Deputy Information Minister Bright Matonga reiterated on 28 August that Mugabe intended to form a Cabinet, saying that this was necessary for the country to move forward, to improve the economy and alleviate suffering. According to Matonga, Mugabe had received a mandate from SADC. MDC-T spokesman Biti, meanwhile, said that the formation of a Cabinet would mean "killing the talks" and that it would be "a disaster and an act of insanity" for Mugabe to attempt to "go it alone". He also said that the MDC was planning to write to Mbeki to protest Mugabe's alleged violations of the July preliminary agreement. Some observers speculated that, by announcing his intention to form a Cabinet, Mugabe was attempting to force the MDC into accepting the power-sharing conditions favoured by ZANU-PF.

ZANU-PF and MDC delegations met separately with Mbeki on 29 August. On the next day, The Herald reported that ZANU-PF had rejected a new MDC proposal, according to which Mugabe and Tsvangirai would co-chair the Cabinet. The Herald denounced this proposal as "absurd" and "insolent", saying that it displayed "stunning ignorance on how government works". MDC-T spokesman Chamisa said on 31 August that "nothing was achieved" in the talks two days prior and that the negotiators had returned to Zimbabwe. The chairman of the Executive Council of the African Union, Tanzanian Foreign Minister Bernard Membe said on 2 September that the African Union hoped that an immediate agreement, providing for power to be split equally between ZANU-PF and the MDC, was still possible.

On 3 September, according to The Herald, Mugabe said while attending Levy Mwanawasa's funeral in Zambia that he would form a Cabinet unless the MDC-T signed a power-sharing agreement by 4 September. The Herald quoted Mugabe as saying that it was unacceptable for the country to go on indefinitely without a new Cabinet. Biti said that the MDC-T had heard nothing about Mugabe's threat except what was published in The Herald. According to Biti, the talks were at a stalemate, but he expressed continued commitment to them, while also saying that if Mugabe formed a Cabinet unilaterally, the dialogue would be destroyed. The Herald also reported that Mugabe again alleged that the MDC-T was resisting an agreement due to British influence; Biti responded that this was "patronizing".

US Assistant Secretary of State for African Affairs Jendayi Frazer said on 5 September that negotiations should continue, warning that her government would consider a Cabinet formed unilaterally by Mugabe to be a "sham". MDC-T leader Tsvangirai on 7 September called for early elections under international supervision if the talks failed.

=== Round 3 (9 September – present) ===
On 9 September 2008, talks resumed with new proposals, with Mbeki flying in from South Africa to mediate. A fresh proposal by Mbeki was tabled that would propose making Tsvangirai an executive prime minister; all three leaders of the major political parties spoke of progress in the talks, and reports of Mugabe backing down on his earlier threats to exclude the MDC surfaced in the foreign press. The day before, Mutambara's group of the MDC announced that they would refuse to work with ZANU-PF if talks were deadlocked. Both Tsvangirai and Mugabe spoke positively of the talks on 10 September 2008.

==== Final power-sharing deal ====
Leaving the talks on 11 September, Tsvangirai told the press that a deal had been reached. Mbeki said later in the day that the deal would be signed in Harare on 15 September in the presence of other African leaders; he did not explain the terms of the deal, saying that they would not be revealed until the deal was signed. The Zimbabwean Permanent Representative to the UN, Boniface Chidyausiku, described the agreement as a "triumph for African diplomacy".

The SADC postponed a meeting of its defence committee indefinitely until Mbeki could finalise a unity deal in Zimbabwe; while confirming that he would attend the meeting, Mbeki told journalists that, if the deal fell through at the last minute, he would tell the SADC that he had done his best as mediator, and that the deal would fall through because one or more of the parties were not serious about the negotiations.

At the end of the fourth day of negotiations Mbeki announced that Mugabe, Tsvangirai, and Mutambara had signed a power-sharing agreement – "memorandum of understanding." Mbeki stated: "An agreement has been reached on all items on the agenda ... all of them [Mugabe, Tsvangirai, Mutambara] endorsed the document tonight, and signed it. The formal signing will be done on Monday 10 am. The document will be released then. The ceremony will be attended by SADC and other African regional and continental leaders. The leaders will spend the next few days constituting the inclusive government to be announced on Monday. The leaders will work very hard to mobilise support for the people to recover. We hope the world will assist so that this political agreement succeeds." The deal is also expected to result in a de facto amnesty for the military and Zanu-PF party leaders. Opposition sources said "Tsvangirai will become prime minister at the head of a council of ministers, the principal organ of government, drawn from his Movement for Democratic Change and the president's Zanu-PF party; and Mugabe will remain president and continue to chair a cabinet that will be a largely consultative body, and the real power will lie with Tsvangirai." South Africa's Business Day reported, however, that Mugabe was refusing to sign a deal which would curtail his presidential powers. According to The New York Times, MDC spokesman Chamisa announced: "This is an inclusive government. The executive power would be shared by the president, the prime minister and the cabinet. Mugabe, Tsvangirai and Arthur Mutambara have still not decided how to divide the ministries. But Jendayi E. Frazer, the American assistant secretary of state for African affairs, said: "We don’t know what’s on the table, and it’s hard to rally for an agreement when no one knows the details or even the broad outlines".

Reportedly, the deal includes the following provisions:

- Mugabe would lead the army and the NSC, Tsvangirai the government and the police.
- A new constitution will be drafted within 18 months; following a referendum on the new constitution, early elections would be held within three months.
- The MDC will have 16 ministers, the ZANU-PF 15.

An MDC official said on 13 September that the MDC wanted to control the key ministries of home affairs, finance, and justice; in return, the official said that the MDC was willing to concede the ministries of defence and state security to ZANU-PF.

On 15 September 2008, SADC leaders witnessed the signing of the power-sharing agreement, brokered by Mbeki. With a symbolic handshake and warm smiles at the Rainbow Towers hotel, in Harare, Mugabe and Tsvangirai signed the deal to end the violent political crisis. Under the terms of the deal, Mugabe will remain president, Tsvangirai will become prime minister, the MDC will control the police, ZANU-PF will control the Army, and Mutambara will become deputy prime minister.

=== Negotiations on Cabinet composition ===
The parties planned to hold talks regarding the allocation of Cabinet portfolios beginning on 16 September, but these talks were delayed. In The Herald on 17 September, Chinamasa said that the necessary constitutional amendments to provide a legal basis for some aspects of the agreement would be considered by Parliament after it began sitting on 14 October. However, he also said that other aspects of the agreement would not require constitutional amendments. Mugabe, in a speech to the ZANU-PF Central Committee that was broadcast live on 17 September, described the agreement as a "humiliation", but said that the party could have avoided the situation if it had not "blundered" in March, when it failed to win a parliamentary majority. However, he asserted that ZANU-PF was still in "the driving seat" and would "not tolerate any nonsense" from the MDC. The Central Committee approved the agreement, while expressing concern that attacks against ZANU-PF supporters could have a negative effect on relations between the parties. On the same day, Tsvangirai said that he was confident that the deal would hold and that Mugabe was committed to it.

The parties held talks regarding the allocation of portfolios on 18 September, but according to Chamisa, the MDC-T spokesman, no agreement was reached and "the matter [was] referred to the negotiators". The negotiators met on 19 September, but according to Chamisa they failed to reach an agreement. Chamisa said that ZANU-PF had a "take, take and take mentality" and wanted to hold all of the most important portfolios, while the MDC favoured a "give and take situation" in which the most important portfolios would be divided fairly. In particular, the MDC wanted to control the finance portfolio, justifying this by pointing to the disastrous state of the economy, but ZANU-PF objected.

==== Mugabe's trip to New York ====
With the situation still unresolved, Mugabe embarked on a trip to the United Nations on 19 September; the MDC complained that he did not swear in Tsvangirai before leaving for this trip, which was expected to last at least a week. Vice-President Joseph Msika was responsible for handling Mugabe's duties while he was out of the country. Chamisa said that Mugabe was unwilling to leave the country in Tsvangirai's hands during his absence. A column in The Herald on 20 September belittled the agreement, saying that Mugabe remained free to appoint a Cabinet of his choosing and was only required to consult with the Prime Minister; it also said that the agreement could "collapse any day". Aside from this, Tsvangirai expressed concern regarding the stark and bitter language in the column (which was generally believed to have been written by Mugabe's spokesman George Charamba, under the pen name Nathaniel Manheru), describing it as hateful. One passage in the column seemed to suggest violence, saying that an audit of land reform, as provided by the agreement, would "draw blood redder than the setting sun." Although Tsvangirai emphasised that he did not think the column's writer was expressing Mugabe's views, he said that if the column reflected ZANU-PF's attitude, the agreement was already doomed.

==== Ouster of Mbeki from South African presidency ====
Only a few days after the agreement was signed, Mbeki was forced to resign as President of South Africa by his party, the African National Congress (ANC). This raised additional concerns about the future of the agreement; it was unclear if Mbeki would continue to act as mediator, and it was unclear if South Africa, under new leadership, would remain so heavily involved in resolving Zimbabwe's political situation. Jakaya Kikwete, the President of Tanzania and Chairman of the African Union, said on 24 September that "the South African government ... will continue to focus on the issue", while SADC spokesman Charles Mubita said that Mbeki would continue to act as mediator. According to Mubita, Mbeki was appointed as mediator "based on his knowledge, understanding and acumen of the situation" and did not necessarily need to be a sitting president to serve in that role. For his part, Mugabe was quoted in The Herald on 25 September as saying that Mbeki's removal as President of South Africa was "devastating" and "very disturbing", while also stating that it was "the action of the South African people" and that as a Zimbabwean he was in no position to judge. Mbeki's successor, Kgalema Motlanthe, said on 2 October that he wanted Mbeki to continue mediating. On 3 October, a spokesman for the South African government announced that Mbeki had agreed to continue in his role as mediator.

Mugabe returned to Zimbabwe from the UN on 29 September. He said upon returning that "there is no deadlock" and that only four ministries were left to be decided. According to Mugabe, the Cabinet would be formed later in the same week. On 30 September, Mugabe and Tsvangirai met, but they were unable to reach an agreement on the allocation of Cabinet portfolios and "the matter was referred to the mediator", according to Chamisa. Chamisa argued that if the portfolios were allocated according to ZANU-PF's wishes, then ZANU-PF would control the government and the MDC would be "a mere cosmetic accessory and mere lipstick". He warned that this was "completely unacceptable" and that the MDC was not so "desperate to be in the government" that it would accept a secondary status. ZANU-PF's Chinamasa, however, denied that there was any deadlock in negotiations and said that all parties were committed to reaching an agreement. He said that any disagreement that might exist was insufficient to warrant Mbeki's intervention and expressed confidence that the matter could be resolved without his help.

==== Further negotiations between party leaders ====
Mugabe, Tsvangirai, and Mutambara met in Harare on 4 October for talks on the distribution of portfolios, but could not reach an agreement; according to Charamba, Mugabe's spokesman, the negotiating teams would meet again to discuss the allocation of the portfolios of finance and home affairs. Spokesmen for the MDC-T and the MDC-M also acknowledged the failure to reach an agreement and said that negotiations would continue. The MDC-T's Chamisa said on 5 October that all of the Cabinet portfolios were in question, not just two of them, as claimed by Charamba.

The negotiators met briefly on 7 October but again failed to reach an agreement. According to Chamisa, the parties were "still in different worlds in a fundamental way". For his part, Biti said that he and fellow MDC negotiator Elton Mangoma left the meeting in outrage after the ZANU-PF negotiators said that they were only present "to justify why they needed the two ministries of home affairs and finance". Biti insisted that the MDC had never agreed to the allocation of any ministries and that it was deceptive for ZANU-PF to claim that there were only two in dispute. He expressed hope that Mbeki could help resolve the situation, saying that if Mbeki was unsuccessful the only remaining hope was divine intervention. It was reported at this time that the power-sharing agreement was near collapse; reportedly, some members of the ZANU-PF leadership were adamant that the party needed to hold the key portfolios, believing that ZANU-PF would be in grave danger if it did not control those ministries. ANC President Jacob Zuma said on the same day that he hoped the Zimbabwean parties could reach an agreement on their own, but he also said that Mbeki was available to facilitate the negotiations if necessary.

Tsvangirai said on 9 October that the talks were deadlocked and progress was impossible unless Mbeki intervened. Meanwhile, Information Minister Sikhanyiso Ndlovu dismissed the claim of a deadlock entirely: "Deadlock is the figment of imagination by our detractors from outside Zimbabwe". According to Ndlovu, it was necessary for ZANU-PF to "teach art of government formation and implementation of policies" to the MDC, as they were "still new". Nevertheless, Mugabe, Tsvangirai, and Mutambara met on 10 October and agreed that Mbeki's mediation was needed.

==== Announcement of cabinet ====
On 11 October, The Herald published an official list showing the allocation of ministries to the three parties; defence, home affairs, foreign affairs, justice, and local government were among the 14 portfolios allotted to ZANU-PF. The MDC-T's 13 portfolios included constitutional and parliamentary affairs, economic planning and investment promotion, labour and social welfare, sport, arts and culture, and science and technology development, while the MDC-M's three portfolios were listed as education, regional integration and international co-operation, and industry and commerce. According to The Herald, only the finance ministry remained in dispute, and it said that Mbeki would travel to Zimbabwe to assist in negotiations on the matter. The allocations published in The Herald were not approved by the MDC-T, which rejected them outright. MDC-T spokesman Chamisa denounced the publication of the list as "unilateral, contemptuous and outrageous", saying that such imbalance in the importance of the portfolios would effectively give ZANU-PF control of the government. He warned that ZANU-PF's "arrogance" would "put the deal into jeopardy". At a rally in Harare on 12 October, Tsvangirai said that the MDC-T would withdraw from the agreement if ZANU-PF did not relent on the allocation of ministries. MDC-M spokesman Edwin Mushoriwa also rejected the list of allocated ministries, saying that it was a "hallucination on the part of ZANU-PF."

An official close to the presidency said the dilution of Mugabe's powers promised in the agreement was "illusory", and described the MDC as merely a "junior partner" whose only role would be "to gain legitimacy and international funds". ZANU-PF planned to take the ministries of defence, justice, home affairs, farming, information, and mines. The mining sector is the last occasionally functioning part of the economy given the country's wealth of natural resources and this carries huge opportunities for corruption. The MDC would be offered the finance ministry, in an effort to persuade donors that real reform was taking place so that would trigger billions in aid and reconstruction. The presidential official said "It's a tricky situation for the MDC...Nonetheless we now have the opposition in government and they have to fix the economy, just as they told the electorate." A ministerial post involving kick starting foreign aid is seen by some as a poison chalice for the MDC. If the party were to succeed it would help shore up support for the ZANU-PF and make it harder to oust in the future, while a failure would cause the MDC to be branded as incompetent and would undermine its own support. MDC officials were said to be aware of the risk of being manipulated and refused to sign up for a ministry that lacks real authority. According to an MDC spokesman, "It would appear that Zanu-PF does not understand power-sharing. We are still poles apart, with them insisting on taking all the key ministries, literally rendering the (opposition) peripheral in government – in fact, a situation where we would be in but out of government."

Msika and Joice Mujuru were sworn in as vice-presidents by Mugabe on 13 October. Justice Minister Chinamasa said that this represented another step in the process and that it would be followed by the swearing in of the Prime Minister and the new Cabinet, remarking that "the locomotive has been too long at the railway station and it is now warming up its engine towards delivering services to the people". According to Chinamasa, parliamentary approval of the constitutional amendments was not necessary prior to the appointment of the Prime Minister; he said that the amendments would enable Tsvangirai and Mutambara to take up seats in Parliament, and that having seats in Parliament would merely provide them with constitutional legitimacy after they assumed office as ministers. In other comments, Chinamasa blamed the MDC for stalling the situation and complained that it was trying to renew discussion on matters that had been previously settled.

==== Return of Mbeki and failure of negotiations ====
Later on 13 October, Mbeki arrived in Zimbabwe to facilitate negotiations. Mugabe and Tsvangirai met for over seven hours on 14 October, but no agreement was reached. Talks over the next two days did not produce an agreement, but on 16 October Mugabe expressed optimism about the possibility of an agreement being reached on the next day, stressing the "need for compromise on both sides". Chamisa said that there was "some movement, but not enough". Reportedly control of the home affairs ministry remained a key sticking point; ZANU-PF was said to have offered the finance ministry to the MDC and to have proposed that the parties alternate control of the home affairs ministry, but the MDC reportedly rejected this proposal.

By 17 October, Tsvangirai announced to the press that the talks had failed due to the conflict over the home affairs ministry, and that both he and Mugabe had agreed to refer a resolution of differences to SADC; Mugabe stated that the talks "went in the wrong direction". On 16 October, SADC had officially acknowledged that it did not recognise Mugabe as the legitimately-elected president in response to a legal application filed against it by the Zimbabwe Exiles Forum, but it rejected a request from the Forum for the rejection of Mugabe from SADC meetings due to SADC's belief that Mbeki's role as moderator in the negotiations would facilitate an end to the deadlock and bring the power-sharing deal to fruition. SADC, according to Tsvangirai, would meet on 20 October in Swaziland to discuss further proceedings; in the meantime, neither party would walk away from talks.

However, on 20 October, the scheduled meeting took place without Tsvangirai in attendance, due to a boycott called by the MDC after Tsvangirai was given a temporary one-way exit document by the Zimbabwean government that was only meant for travel to Swaziland; Swaziland is geographically landlocked by South Africa and Mozambique, and any travel to Swaziland would go through the air or groundspace of either country. The MDC took the lack of an official passport, which Tsvangirai had lacked for months prior to the scheduled talks, as a sign of the ZANU-PF's lack of consideration for the MDC or the talks, while the ZANU-PF regarded the matter as a technicality that was due to the government's lack of access to paper. The meeting, instead, brought Mugabe to discuss matters with the SADC troika of heads of state from Swaziland, Mozambique and Tanzania, also known as the "Organ on Politics, Defence and Security"; in addition, it was announced that the current South African president, Kgalema Motlanthe, would join the organ. Meanwhile, negotiations between the three parties were suspended for a week.

A new meeting was scheduled to be held in Harare on 27 October. MDC-T spokesman Chamisa said on 24 October that Tsvangirai would attend that meeting. On 25 October, Tsvangirai said that while the MDC respected SADC and the regional leaders, it would not sign an unsuitable deal at their behest. The SADC meeting in Harare was unsuccessful, with control of the home affairs ministry remaining the key sticking point. A communique issued afterwards called for a new SADC summit to be held "as a matter of urgency".

==== SADC ruling, cholera outbreak and Mbeki–Tsvangirai spat ====
At the subsequent SADC summit in Johannesburg, the SADC leaders proposed the immediate formation of a Cabinet with shared control of the Ministry of Home Affairs. Tsvangirai rejected this and criticised SADC for not confronting Mugabe. Returning from the summit on 10 November, Mugabe said that the new Cabinet would be appointed "as quickly as possible" and expressed his hope that the MDC would accept the SADC proposal, while Chinamasa said that the MDC had been invited to submit names for the Cabinet. On 12 November, MDC-T spokesman Chamisa said that his party would not join the Cabinet until "outstanding issues such as the issue of governors, equity and allocation of key ministries" were resolved. Bright Matonga, the Deputy Minister of Information, was quoted by The Herald on the same day as saying that the MDC would "never hold this country to ransom" and that there was no reason why a Cabinet could not be formed without the MDC if necessary.

On 24 November, Motlanthe, the President of South Africa, urged the parties to reach an agreement, warning that if they did not, "the situation will get worse and will implode or collapse altogether". Talks between ZANU-PF and the MDC restarted in South Africa on 25 November, again mediated by Mbeki. Mbeki described the negotiations as "the same as ever, forward and backwards, sideways and around ... the usual". Tsvangirai released a statement on 26 November calling on Mbeki to step down. According to Tsvangirai, Mbeki "does not appear to understand how desperate the problem in Zimbabwe is, and the solutions he proposes are too small"; he also accused Mbeki of supporting ZANU-PF and said that the MDC could not "continue negotiating under his facilitation". Two days later, a letter from Mbeki sharply criticising Tsvangirai's position was published. In this letter, Mbeki urged Tsvangirai to "take responsibility for the future of Zimbabwe" instead of devoting himself to "being a militant critic of President Mugabe and ZANU-PF." In response to Tsvangirai's accusation that the SADC leaders lacked the courage to confront Mugabe, Mbeki said that Tsvangirai had "describe[d] us in a manner that is most offensive in terms of African culture". He also suggested that Tsvangirai perhaps believed "that others further away, in Western Europe and North America, are of greater importance" to Zimbabwe than other countries in the region and Africa as a whole.

On 28 November, the details of the bill to change the constitution were agreed, but four other issues remained open. When asked how the talks were going, Chamisa stated that the glass was either half-full or half-empty, depending on the point of view. In the 30 November edition of The Sunday Mail, Chinamasa said that the negotiators had prepared the text for this amendment, but that it still needed to be approved by the leaders on both sides.

==== New unilateral threats and MDC capitulation ====
In remarks published in The Herald on 5 December, Mugabe told the ZANU-PF Politburo that "if the arrangement fails to work in the next one-and-a-half to two years", there would be an early election. On 13 December, the draft constitutional amendment was published in the government gazette. According to Motlanthe, the amendment marked a "major step towards the formation of an inclusive government in Zimbabwe", and he expressed his hope that Tsvangirai would be sworn in immediately; it was believed that Mugabe was empowered to swear in Tsvangirai as prime minister without waiting for parliamentary approval of the amendment. Chamisa stressed that the outstanding issues of cabinet portfolios and provincial governors still needed to be resolved, while Chinamasa echoed Mugabe's earlier warning that he would call a new election if power-sharing was not successful.

On 19 December 2008, Mugabe claimed that the US was trying to get Southern African countries to oust him from power, but that his regional neighbours were "not brave enough". On 4 January, Mugabe fired 12 ministers and deputy ministers who had lost their seats in Parliament from the cabinet:

- Chen Chimutengwende (Public and Interactive Affairs)
- Rugare Gumbo (Agriculture)
- Amos Midzi (Mines and Mining Development)
- Opa Muchinguri (Women's Affairs and Community Development)
- Samuel Mumbengegwi (Finance)
- Munacho Mutezo (Water Resources and Infrastructure Development)
- Sikhanyiso Ndlovu (Information and Publicity)
- Michael Nyambuya (Energy and Power Development)
- Sithembiso Nyoni (Small and Medium Enterprises)
- David Chapfika (deputy minister for Agriculture)
- Edwin Muguti (deputy minister for Health)
- Kenneth Mutiwekuziva (deputy minister for Small and Medium Enterprises)

On 15 January 2009, Mugabe announced that he would hold talks with Tsvangirai again within a week. On 18 January 2009, Mugabe issued an ultimatum, calling on Tsvangirai to join the unity government or "break from it", refusing to concede on any points of contention.

After another SADC meeting on 26 January 2009, there were conflicting reports. The SADC and ZANU-PF claimed that it had been agreed that the Constitutional Amendment would be adopted on 5 February 2009 and the new government, including Tsvangirai, sworn in on 11 February 2009, while the MDC stated that there had been no agreement on key issues. However, on 29 January 2009 the MDC confirmed that it would join the inclusive government and that the MDC's national council would vote on the issue on 30 January 2009; it approved the deal. South African President Motlanthe pledged to assist Zimbabwe in the rebuilding process once the unity government was in place.

The news of the MDC's entry into government was followed by outbreaks of last-minute farm raids by war veterans, who feared that the coalition government would rein in the land reforms as a liberalising measure for the economy. On 5 February, both houses of parliament passed the unity government bill unanimously. Motlanthe expressed optimism on 8 February, saying that Mugabe and Tsvangirai "seem to be getting along fairly well".

On 10 February, the law creating a National Security Council, which would include Mugabe and Tsvangirai, was passed by Parliament. Tsvangirai designated the MDC's choices for Cabinet positions on the same day; these included Tendai Biti as Minister of Finance and Giles Mutseyekwa as Co-Minister of Home Affairs. Mugabe's ministerial appointees for ZANU-PF were subsequently announced; this list was dominated by members of the ZANU-PF old guard.

Tsvangirai and the deputy prime ministers were sworn in on 11 February 2009 as planned. On 13 February 2009, shortly before the planned swearing-in ceremony of the government, the MDC's nominee for deputy agriculture minister, Roy Bennett, was arrested at the Harare airport.

== Aftermath ==
In August 2013, following Tsvangrai's defeat in the 2013 Zimbabwean general election, Tsavngrai announced that he and his party, the Movement for Democratic Change (MDC) would no longer work with Robert Mugabe's Zanu-PF party, arguing that the elections were rigged and the election results were fraudulent. This would likely mean that Tsvangrai will resign as the Prime Minister of Zimbabwe, and the breakage of the power sharing deal.
