= Herbert Murerwa =

Zimbabwean politician

The Right Honourable Herbert Murerwa MP

Minister of Lands and Land Resettlement of Zimbabwe
- In office 13 February 2009 – 27 November 2017
- Prime Minister: Morgan Tsvangirai

Minister of Finance of Zimbabwe
- In office April 1996 – July 2000
- President: Robert Mugabe
- Preceded by: Emmerson Mnangagwa
- Succeeded by: Simba Makoni
- In office August 2002 – February 2004
- Deputy: Christopher Kuruneri
- Preceded by: Simba Makoni
- Succeeded by: Christopher Kuruneri
- In office April 2004 – February 2007
- Preceded by: Christopher Kuruneri
- Succeeded by: Samuel Mumbengegwi

Personal details
- Born: 31 July 1941 (age 85)
- Party: Zimbabwe African National Union-Patriotic Front
- Profession: Farmer

Herbert Muchemwa Murerwa (born 31 July 1941) is a Zimbabwean politician. He served as the Finance Minister of Zimbabwe from April 1996 to July 2000, from August 2002 to February 2004, and again from 26 April 2004 to 6 February 2007. He has been Minister of Lands and Land Resettlement since February 2009.

== Political career ==
In a cabinet reshuffle on 9 February 2004, Murerwa was replaced as Finance Minister by his deputy, Christopher Kureneri, and was instead appointed as Minister of Higher and Tertiary Education. Following the arrest of Kureneri, Murerwa was additionally appointed as acting Finance Minister later in 2004. On 16 April 2005, he was formally appointed as Finance Minister again, leaving the post of Higher Education Minister; this followed the March 2005 parliamentary election, in which Murerwa was elected to the House of Assembly from Goromonzi constituency.

Murerwa engineered the historic repayment of US$120 million (out of $300 million) in debt to the International Monetary Fund (IMF), prior to their enforcement of a threat to expel Zimbabwe from the IMF for nonpayment of arrears (31 August 2005). Commenting on his country's accomplishment, he stated that it proved "that no one can write off Zimbabwe as yet" and that we "can still do things on our own." This repayment has put Zimbabwe in an excellent position to move forward on loan talks with neighbour South Africa for a loan of between US$200 and US$500 million.

During his tenure Zimbabwe's economy shrunk by 30% between 2000 and 2004 following the seizure of about 4,500 white-owned commercial farms which sent agricultural production plummeting.

Inflation, at 164.3% in June 2005, increased to 254.8% in July 2005, creating a speed-bump on the road to the government's goal of bringing inflation down to 80% by year end. Murerwa recently presented a supplementary budget to pay wages, import food and build new housing, after admitting that targets for economic growth and inflation would be missed. Inflation was at 1193% in July 2006 making it the highest inflation rate in the world outside the war zones. Many people viewed Murerwa as the reason why the Zimbabwean economy was struggling due to his 'yes my lord' approach towards President Robert Mugabe. This was aggravated by the fact that he opposed the currency reforms initiated by Gideon Gono, the Reserve Bank of Zimbabwe director, in August 2006. Before that Murerwa wanted to introduce $250,000 bearer cheque during the absence of Gono which would have fuelled the inflation rate further only to be stopped by Mugabe.

During his Fiscal Policy Review on 16 August 2005 Murerwa said, "Bringing down inflation, initially to double digit, and ultimately to single digit levels remains our objective. The disinflation process will, however, not be smooth sailing. Addressing the prevailing high inflation challenges facing us demands that we all make sacrifices, with Ministries living within our economy's means. There will simply be no magic solutions to our challenges."

He also commented on corruption, saying it "negatively affects the social and moral fabric of the nation, encouraging indiscipline and rent seeking behaviour – with the resultant hardships largely falling on the poor. It causes major costs to business activities and, hence, the introduction of various measures and institutions to decisively deal with this problem. In this regard, Government, in consultation with stakeholders, has announced the appointment of members of the Anti-Corruption Commission. Prohibitive penalties for corrupt practices are being considered, including the intensification of awareness campaigns of all existing Whistle Blower Funds. In the case of upholding the integrity of officers at the Zimbabwe Revenue Authority, Government has initiated ongoing measures to nip all corrupt tendencies at border posts. Already, a number of criminal activities have been unearthed with several officers under investigation and prosecution. Similar exercises are being extended to other Government departments, including Immigration, VID, CMED, the Registrar General's Office."

As part of a much-anticipated cabinet reshuffle by President Robert Mugabe, Murerwa lost his cabinet post on 6 February 2007.

This followed a public spat with Reserve bank Governor Gideon Gono over fiscal policies. According to the Zimbabwe Times the Reserve Bank governor took the unprecedented step of attacking Murerwa in lengthy statements published in the government-owned press as advertisements. Mugabe appeared to side with Gono, leaving the minister exposed. Murerwa and Gono had apparently taken opposing views on the issue of payments made by the Reserve Bank for various services offered to the Government of Zimbabwe.

In a brief telephone conversation with The Times, Murerwa said that he did not want to make any comments over the issue of his departure from cabinet. "I do not want to comment. Why should I?" he asked before ending the conversation. It was thought that Murerwa might be keeping silent on the issue in the expectation that he could be tapped to replace the ailing Stan Mudenge as Minister of Tertiary Education.

Murerwa was nominated as ZANU-PF's candidate for the Senate seat from Goromonzi, in Mashonaland East, in the March 2008 parliamentary election. He narrowly won the seat according to official results, receiving 16,156 votes against 15,287 for Vincent Gwarazimba of the Movement for Democratic Change-Tsvangirai faction and 4,560 for Marimo Cloudios of the MDC-Mutambara faction.

When the ZANU-PF–MDC national unity government was sworn in on 13 February 2009, Murerwa became Minister of Lands and Land Resettlement.

On 27 November 2017, Emmerson Mnangagwa, who succeeded ousted President Robert Mugabe following the 2017 Zimbabwean coup d'état, announced the dissolution of the Zimbabwe Cabinet, leaving only Patrick Chinamasa and Simbarashe Mumbengegwi as acting ministers of Finance and Foreign Affairs respectively.

Murerwa was put on the United States sanctions list in 2003.

== Occupations ==
- Minister of Finance– Government of Zimbabwe (2002–2004)
- Minister of International Trade and Technology– Government of Zimbabwe (2001–2002)
- Minister of Higher Education and Technology– Government of Zimbabwe (2000–2001)
- Minister of Finance– Government of Zimbabwe (1996–2000)
- Minister of Industry and Commerce– Government of Zimbabwe (1995–1996)
- Minister of Environment and Tourism– Government of Zimbabwe (1990–1995)
- High Commissioner to the UK– Government of Zimbabwe (1984–1990)

== Education ==
- 1970, BA in sociology, George Williams College, USA;
- 1972, Master's in education, Harvard University, USA;
- 1978, Doctor of education, Harvard University, USA.

== Sources ==
- Mid-Term Fiscal Policy Review Statement, delivered 16 August 2005
- The Africa Centre, London

Diplomatic posts
Preceded by Robert Tatira Zwinoira	High Commissioner of Zimbabwe to the United Kingdom; 1984–1990	Succeeded by Stephen Chiketa
