= George Guvamatanga =

Zimbabwean technocrat and banker (born 1971)

Permanent Secretary of the Ministry of Finance and Investment Promotion
- Incumbent
- Assumed office September 2018
- President: Emmerson Mnangagwa
- Minister: Mthuli Ncube
- Preceded by: Willard Manungo

Personal details
- Born: 1971 (age 54–55) Kambuzuma, Harare, Rhodesia
- Education: University of London (MBA); University of Zimbabwe
- Website: https://www.georgeguvamatanga.com

George Tongesayi Guvamatanga (born 1971) is a Zimbabwean technocrat and banker who has served as Permanent Secretary of the Ministry of Finance and Investment Promotion of Zimbabwe since 2018.

== Early life and education ==
George Guvamatanga was born in Kambuzuma, a suburb of Harare, in Rhodesia (now Zimbabwe), where his parents had settled.

He was born during the Rhodesian Bush War, a period of significant political and social turmoil in Zimbabwe.

Guvamatanga pursued higher education at the University of Zimbabwe, where he earned a Bachelor of Commerce degree in Accounting in the early 1990s. He later became a chartered accountant.

== Career ==
Banker

Guvamatanga spent over three decades in the private sector, primarily in banking. He worked for Barclays Bank Zimbabwe for thirty years, culminating in his appointment as managing director and executive director in January 2008. During his tenure, he also served as president of the Bankers Association of Zimbabwe (BAZ).

In 2017, Barclays Plc sold its majority stake in Barclays Bank Zimbabwe to FMB Capital Holdings of Malawi. Guvamatanga led a consortium of managers bidding to acquire the bank, a move that was ultimately unsuccessful. Upon the sale, he left Barclays.

== Mutapa Investment Fund ==
Guvamatanga was involved in designing the legal framework for the transfer of State-Owned Entities (SOEs) into the Mutapa Investment Fund:

- Transfer of SOEs: Using special powers, the President of Zimbabwe, Emmerson Mnangagwa, transferred the ownership of approximately 20 SOEs across key sectors (mining, transport, power, etc.) into the Mutapa Investment Fund.
- Defence of the Framework: As the Permanent Secretary of Finance, Guvamatanga has been the public face defending the structure of the new Fund, including the use of Presidential Powers to enact the changes and the transfer of SOEs into its control. He was instrumental in the technical design and execution of the legal instrument that facilitated this mass transfer and exempting the Fund from certain public procurement laws. This legal move is often seen as the "efficient movement" of SOEs, as it bypasses lengthy legislative procedures and procurement rules for the fund itself.

== Other works ==
=== Victor Farms ===
Victor Farms, established in 2017, is one of Guvamatanga's business interests. It produces and supplies milk to Dairibord. The farm uses a 66-point rotary milking system. This is the second-largest rotary milking system in the country, with Victor Farm managing over 2,905 cows, including a milking herd of 1,300, yielding 26,000 liters of milk per day and contributing 7% to the nation’s milk production. Victor Farms invests in research and development, partnering with Dairibord’s laboratories, farmers, and herd health managers to support herd health and milk production.

== Government service ==
In September 2018, Guvamatanga was appointed Permanent Secretary of the Ministry of Finance and Economic Development (later renamed the Ministry of Finance and Investment Promotion) as part of a restructuring effort by President Emmerson Mnangagwa’s administration. His appointment was seen as an attempt to leverage private-sector expertise to strengthen Zimbabwe’s financial systems. In this role, he has been involved in managing the country’s fiscal policies, including responses to currency reforms, inflation, and economic stabilization efforts.

On November 25, 2021, Guvamatanga was appointed as a non-executive director of the Eastern and Southern African Trade and Development Bank Group (TDB).

== Controversies ==
Guvamatanga has occasionally attracted public attention for his personal achievements and lifestyle, which is a result of the wealth he accumulated during his 30 years in corporate banking and a substantial severance package from his 30-year career at Barclays Bank Zimbabwe. In August 2020, after overcoming a near-fatal bout with COVID-19 alongside eight family members, Guvamatanga celebrated his recovery by chartering a private jet for a family trip to Victoria Falls. In response to public speculation about the trip, he emphasized that his financial means were legitimately acquired through his severance.

In October 2021, Guvamatanga marked his 50th birthday with a celebration featuring South African artists Makhadzi and Mafikizolo. It was stated that he offered to pay them more than their agreed-upon fees.

=== Allegations ===
In September 2024, NewsHawks published a report claiming that George Guvamatanga owned 12 luxury properties in Johannesburg, South Africa, valued in the millions of US dollars, suggesting concerns over asset declaration compliance and potential corruption.

=== Blessed Geza's accusations directed at George Guvamatanga ===
Blessed Runesu Geza's allegations directed at George Guvamatanga refer to a series of claims made by Blessed "Bombshell" Geza, a former Zanu-PF Central Committee member and Zimbabwean war veteran, targeting George Guvamatanga, the permanent secretary for the Ministry of Finance and Economic Development. Geza's accusations, which emerged in early 2025, center on allegations of corruption and mismanagement within President Emmerson Mnangagwa’s administration, with Guvamatanga being accused of facilitating corrupt financial dealings. These claims have been widely criticized for their lack of evidence, perceived political motivations, and potential to undermine Zimbabwe’s economic stability.

=== Background ===
George Guvamatanga has served as permanent secretary for the Ministry of Finance and Economic Development since September 2018, playing a key role in Zimbabwe’s economic reforms, including the introduction of the Zimbabwe Gold (ZiG) currency in April 2024. Blessed Geza, a former Zanu-PF member expelled from the party in March 2025, emerged as a vocal critic of Mnangagwa’s administration following his departure. Geza, a war veteran known as "Bombshell," has accused the government of corruption, tribalism, and mismanagement, calling for Mnangagwa’s impeachment and nationwide protests dubbed "stay-aways."

=== Geza’s allegations ===
In early 2025, Geza launched a public campaign against Mnangagwa’s government, using platforms like YouTube and X to amplify his message. As part of this campaign, he targeted Guvamatanga, accusing him of enabling corrupt financial dealings to benefit Mnangagwa’s inner circle. In an April 2025 article published by iniAfrica, Geza labeled Guvamatanga a "Zvigananda" (a Shona term for thief) and linked him to the controversial "ED 2030" agenda, which critics allege is a scheme to extend Mnangagwa’s presidency beyond 2028 while plundering national resources. Geza also implicated other figures, including Finance Minister Mthuli Ncube and businessman Kudakwashe Regimond Tagwirei, alleging systemic corruption within the Ministry of Finance imbues a "picture of systemic corruption" of the Ministry of Finance. Geza’s allegations gained some traction among Zimbabweans frustrated by economic challenges, including inflation and currency instability, following the reintroduction of the Zimbabwean dollar in 2019 and subsequent economic policies.

=== Criticism of the allegations and lack of evidence ===
Critics have highlighted the absence of concrete evidence to support Geza’s claims. Despite serious accusations, such as Guvamatanga bypassing tender processes and turning the Ministry of Finance into a "crime scene," Geza has failed to provide specific instances, financial records, or witness testimonies to substantiate his allegations. In contrast, Guvamatanga’s tenure has been credited with achievements like bonuses, timely civil servant salary payments, and accelerated infrastructure projects, which have contributed to economic stability despite Zimbabwe’s $17 billion debt burden.

=== Political motivations ===
Geza’s allegations are widely viewed as politically motivated, stemming from Zanu-PF’s internal factionalism. Analysts suggest that Geza, reportedly aligned with a faction loyal to Vice President Constantino Chiwenga, is targeting Guvamatanga to weaken Mnangagwa’s administration. His expulsion from Zanu-PF in March 2025 and subsequent charges of undermining the president and inciting violence further undermine his credibility.

=== The call for accountability and truth ===
Blessed Geza’s allegations against George Guvamatanga exemplify the dangers of unsubstantiated rhetoric in Zimbabwe’s polarized political climate. Geza’s campaign, marked by failed protests and dismissed impeachment efforts underscores the need for accountability on both sides: for officials to remain transparent and for critics to substantiate their accusations

== Impact on Zimbabwe ==
Geza’s unsubstantiated claims have been criticized for their potential to destabilize Zimbabwe’s economy. By eroding public trust in the Ministry of Finance, the allegations risk discouraging foreign investment and complicating economic recovery efforts. His calls for protests, including the failed "M31" stay-away on March 31, 2025, led to 95 arrests and heightened security measures, diverting resources from development priorities.

=== Guvamatanga’s response ===
Guvamatanga has not only denied the allegations but has gone further, urging his detractors to file formal charges backed with evidence. Geza’s claims have largely fallen on deaf ears, with government officials dismissing them as part of a Western-sponsored smear campaign to discredit Zimbabwe’s leadership. Guvamatanga maintains that his wealth stems from a lucrative severance package from Barclays Bank Zimbabwe and his entrepreneurial ventures, including successful farming operations such as Victor Farms, which supplies 27,000 liters of milk daily to Dairibord.

=== Energy Mutodi: False Allegations and Public Apology ===
Despite his professional role, George Guvamatanga has occasionally been the subject of public controversy stemming from false allegations. Notably, in a high-profile incident, former Deputy Minister of Information, Publicity, and Broadcasting Services, Energy Mutodi, made unsubstantiated claims against Guvamatanga. These allegations, which garnered public attention, were later retracted. Mutodi publicly acknowledged the falsehood of his earlier statements and issued a public apology to Guvamatanga for the claims he had circulated.

== Legacy and analysis ==
=== Media coverage and allegations ===
George Guvamatanga has been the subject of several reports in Zimbabwean media regarding allegations made against him by businessman Tinashe Geza. These reports focused on administrative and financial conduct within the Ministry.

== Personal life ==
Guvamatanga is married to Angela Guvamatanga, a farmer with no public profile. He and eight family members contracted and recovered from COVID-19 in 2020, an experience he described as near-fatal, according to Temba Mliswa. He is known to be a supporter of Arsenal Football Club, reportedly traveling to the UK on a private jet to watch matches, courtesy of business associate Kudakwashe Regimond Tagwirei.
