= Simba Makoni =

Zimbabwean politician

Doctor Simbarashe Makoni

Minister of Finance and Economic Development of Zimbabwe
- In office July 2000 – August 2002
- President: Robert Mugabe
- Preceded by: Herbert Murerwa
- Succeeded by: Herbert Murerwa

Personal details
- Born: 22 March 1950 (age 76) Southern Rhodesia
- Party: Zimbabwe African National Union-Patriotic Front (???? – 2008); Independent (2008 – present)
- Spouse: Chipo Makoni
- Children: Takura Makoni; Tonderai Makoni (deceased); Tafara Makoni
- Education: Leeds University (BSc); Leicester Polytechnic (PhD)
- Profession: Chemist; Business consultant
- Website: smakoni.com

Simbarashe Herbert Stanley Makoni (born 22 March 1950) is a Zimbabwean politician and was a candidate for the March 2008 presidential election against incumbent Robert Mugabe. He was Minister of Finance and Economic Development in President Robert Mugabe's cabinet from 2000 to 2002. He faced strong opposition during the Economic Change in Zimbabwe in the early 2000s as his policies contradicted those of the rest of the ZANU-PF party.

== Early life and education ==
Makoni trained as a chemist in the UK during the Second Chimurenga years. During his studies, he represented the Zimbabwe African National Union in Europe. He earned his BSc at Leeds University and a PhD at Leicester Polytechnic in medicinal chemistry. He also owns a farm in Headlands, Zimbabwe.

== Political career ==
=== First term in government ===
Makoni was appointed Deputy Minister of Agriculture at Zimbabwe's independence in 1980, when he was thirty years old. In 1981, he was moved to the position of Minister of Industry and Energy Development, where he remained until 1983.

=== SADC ===
In 1983, Makoni was elected as the Executive Secretary of the Southern African Development Community (SADC), serving in that post for ten years. A $25,000 scam that rocked SADC in 1993, resulted in the dismissal of three financial officers, who implicated Makoni. He accepted full responsibility as executive secretary, but denied any personal wrongdoing. Leaving SADC in 1994, Makoni became managing director of Zimbabwe Newspapers until 1997.

=== Second term in government ===
Makoni returned to the Cabinet as Minister of Finance by Mugabe on 15 July 2000, following the June 2000 parliamentary election. As Finance Minister, he supported the devaluation of the Zimbabwean dollar, a policy that was not favoured by Mugabe, and he was replaced by Herbert Murerwa in the cabinet named on 25 August 2002.

=== Presidential candidacy ===
From as early as 2003, was reported that Makoni was favoured by some in ZANU-PF and the opposition Movement for Democratic Change, as well as African mediators, as a potential replacement for Mugabe. In January 2008, the BBC reported that Simba Makoni might be nominated to run against Mugabe in the March 2008 presidential election. Makoni attempted to run in the concurrent 2008 parliamentary election as ZANU-PF's candidate for the House of Assembly from the constituency of Makoni Central, but he was barred from standing in the party primary (in which he would have faced then Justice Minister and current Finance Minister Patrick Chinamasa); it was judged that he had submitted his curriculum vitae too late to qualify.

On 5 February 2008, Simba Makoni held a press conference in Harare where he stated that he was challenging Robert Mugabe to become the next President of Zimbabwe. Up to that point he had remained a member of the ZANU-PF Politburo and the party's Deputy Secretary of Economic Affairs.

He told reporters, flanked by Ibo Mandaza and Retired Major Kudzai Mbudzi:

"Following very extensive and intensive consultations with party members and activists countrywide, and also with others outside the party, I have accepted the call and hereby advise the people of Zimbabwe that I offer myself as candidate for the office of president...I share the agony and anguish of all citizens over the extreme hardships that we all have endured for nearly 10 years now...I also share the widely held view that these hardships are a result of failure of national leadership and that change at that level is a pre-requisite for change at other levels of national endeavour."

Makoni said that he would have liked to run as ZANU-PF's candidate, but since he could not, he was running as an independent. He later said that his conclusion that political change was necessary was not the result of a "St.-Paul-on-the-road-to-Damascus awakening. This has been a continuum, incremental, things have been building up."

Joseph Chinotimba, a war veteran who led the violent invasions of white owned farms in 2000, threatened Makoni with violence following the announcement of his candidature. A leading figure in ZANU-PF, Emmerson Mnangagwa, told ZBC TV that by choosing to stand for a position when the party had already chosen someone to stand for that position, Makoni had expelled himself from the party. The Herald newspaper denounced Makoni as being a pawn of the United Kingdom whose candidacy was being used in hopes of splitting the ZANU-PF vote so that Morgan Tsvangirai of the Movement for Democratic Change (MDC) could win the election.

Speaking on 7 February, Makoni denied claims that he was a Western pawn or that he was being used by ZANU-PF itself to split the opposition vote. He also said that the ZANU-PF constitution did not provide for self-expulsion and that still considered himself a member of ZANU-PF until and unless he is expelled from the party through due process. Referring to support he claims to have inside ZANU-PF, he urged these supporters to "remain steadfast and not be intimidated". ZANU-PF spokesman Nathan Shamuyarira subsequently sought to clarify the matter by saying that Makoni was expelled from the party, in accordance with party rules providing for the expulsion of a member who challenges a designated ZANU-PF candidate in an election, and he said that anyone who supported Makoni would be expelled as well. Morgan Tsvangirai said on 11 February that Makoni was merely "old wine in a new bottle" and that he would not ally with Makoni for the election.

Mugabe spoke about Makoni's candidacy for the first time on 21 February, describing it as "absolutely disgraceful", comparing Makoni to a prostitute, and criticising Makoni for what he considered a self-important attitude.

When Makoni announced his candidature, he stated that many in ZANU-PF particularly the political "heavyweights" would publicly announce their support for him. This triggered intense speculation that the vice-president's husband and retired army commander, Solomon Mujuru would declare his support for him. However, no such heavyweights came forward. However, the following notable endorsements were made:

- On 15 February, Arthur Mutambara, the leader of another MDC faction not led by Tsvangirai, said that he would not run for President and that his faction would instead back Makoni.
- At the opening of Makoni's campaign on 29 February, former Interior Minister Dumiso Dabengwa and former Speaker of Parliament Cyril Ndebele were present to support him. Also present at White City hall where Makoni launched his campaign was Edgar Tekere who vowed to campaign against Mugabe until election time.
- Fay Chung the former Zimbabwe Minister of Education and Culture and currently an independent candidate in the March 2008 senatorial elections has also formally endorsed Makoni.

Official results indicated that Makoni had received 8.3% of the vote, finishing third. He endorsed Morgan Tsvangirai for the runoff.

=== National Alliance for Democracy ===
Since the presidential elections, Makoni has several times indicated his intention to convert his Muvambo/Kusile/Dawn formation into a formal political party. On 22 July 2008, the formation's national management committee met and agreed to finalise the transformation of the project into a political party, to be known as the National Alliance for Democracy.

== See also ==
- Jonathan Moyo
- Denford Magora
