= Ministry of Finance (Zimbabwe) =

Government ministry

Ministry overview
- Formed: 18 April 1980; 46 years ago
- Preceding Ministry: Ministry of Finance (Rhodesia)
- Jurisdiction: Government of Zimbabwe
- Headquarters: 3rd Floor, Block B, Mgandane Dlodlo Building, Corner Central Avenue and Simon Muzenda Street, Harare; 17.824209622253246°S 31.052323348462235°E
- Minister responsible: Mthuli Ncube, Minister of Finance
- Deputy Minister responsible: Kudakwashe Mnangagwa, Deputy Minister of Finance
- Ministry executive: George Guvamatanga, Permanent Secretary
- Child agencies: ZIMRA; RBZ; MIF
- Website: zimtreasury.co.zw

The Ministry of Finance, formerly known as the Ministry of Finance, Economic Development and Investment Promotion, is a government ministry responsible for the economy of Zimbabwe.

The incumbent Finance Minister is Mthuli Ncube while the Deputy Minister is David Kudakwashe Mnangagwa. The Ministry of Finance oversees the Reserve Bank of Zimbabwe, Zimbabwe Revenue Authority and Mutapa Investment Fund. It is headquartered at Treasury House at New Government Complex in Harare.

== See also ==
- List of finance ministers of Zimbabwe
- Ministry of Economic Development and Investment Promotion
- Ministry of Finance (Rhodesia)
