= Paul Mangwana =

Zimbabwean politician

The Hon. Paul Mangwana MP

Minister of Indigenisation and Empowerment
- In office February 2007 – February 2009
- President: Robert Mugabe
- Preceded by: Samuel Mumbengegwi
- Succeeded by: Savior Kasukuwere

Minister of State for State Enterprises and Parastatals
- In office August 2002 – February 2004

Personal details
- Born: 10 August 1961 (age 64) Southern Rhodesia
- Party: ZANU-PF
- Occupation: Cabinet Minister
- Profession: Politician, Lawyer, Farmer

Munyaradzi Paul Mangwana (born 10 August 1961) is a Zimbabwean politician, who has previously served in the cabinet of Zimbabwe.

== Political career ==
Mangwana, who had previously served as Deputy Minister of Transport and Communications, was appointed as Minister of State for State Enterprises and Parastatals on 25 August 2002. He was subsequently appointed as Minister of Labour and Social Welfare on 9 February 2004 and later served as acting Minister of Information before being appointed as Minister of Indigenisation and Empowerment on 6 February 2007.

He was placed on the United States sanctions list from 2003 to 2014.

After the Indigenisation and Economic Empowerment Bill, which provides for Zimbabweans to hold a majority share in all businesses, was passed in March 2008, Mangwana said that the law did not mean expropriation would take place and that there was "no reason to panic". He noted that existing businesses would "need time to adjust" and said that "engagement and consultation" would take place within a timeframe of perhaps five or ten years. Defending the law, he said that "the revolution is not complete until indigenous Zimbabweans own the means of production".

Mangwana was nominated by ZANU-PF as its candidate for the House of Assembly seat from Chivi Central constituency, in Masvingo Province, in the March 2008 parliamentary election. He won the seat with 8,228 votes, defeating Chivhanga Henry of the Movement for Democratic Change, who received 6,471 votes, and Mufudzi Tinashe, an independent who received 452 votes.

On 7 January 2009, The Herald reported that Mangwana was taking over as Acting Minister of Information and Publicity following the dismissal of Sikhanyiso Ndlovu, who failed to win a seat in the 2008 election.

In April 2009, Mangwana was named to represent ZANU-PF alongside Douglas Mwonzora of the MDC-T and Edward Mkhosi of MDC-N as co-chairs of a Committee to collect the views of Zimbabweans and to draft a new Constitution for Zimbabwe. The constitution making process was the subject of a documentary, Democrats by Danish filmmaker Camilla Nielsson, in which Mangwana is featured prominently alongside Mwonzora.

Political offices
Preceded by Samuel Mumbengegwi	Minister of State for Indigenisation and Empowerment; 2007 –	Incumbent
