= Sikhanyiso =

Sikhanyiso is a South African given name. Notable people with the name include:

- Sikhanyiso Dlamini (born 1987), eldest daughter of King Mswati III of Swaziland
- Sikhanyiso Ndlovu (1937–2015), Zimbabwean politician and a former Minister of Information and Publicity
