= Spartan Security Investments =

Zimbabwean finance company

Spartan Security Investment
- Company type: Private company
- Industry: Investment fund
- Founded: 2013; 13 years ago
- Headquarters: Harare, Zimbabwe
- Area served: Zimbabwe
- Key people: K.Mnangagwa (co-founder); Luka Ignatius Fabris (director); Edmund Ngandundu (director); Charles T. Chimbwanda (director)
- Products: Securities
- Revenue: Undisclosed
- Operating income: Undisclosed
- Net income: Undisclosed
- Total assets: Undisclosed (2023)
- Owner: K. Mnangagwa and others
- Number of employees: Undisclosed

Spartan Security Investments (Private) Limited is a Zimbabwean company that specializes in finance and securities-related investments. It is owned by the country's deputy minister of finance and investment promotion, David Kudakwashe Mnangagwa. The company has been accused of shady deals, which have increased Zimbabwean currency instability. In 2023, its bank accounts were frozen for illicit black market trading.
