= Mumbengegwi =

Mumbengegwi is a surname. Notable people with the surname include:

- Simbarashe Mumbengegwi, Zimbabwean politician
- Samuel Mumbengegwi, Zimbabwean politician
