= David Kudakwashe Mnangagwa =

Zimbabwean politician

The Hon. David Kudakwashe Mnangagwa MP

Deputy Minister of Finance
- Incumbent
- Assumed office 8 October 2026
- President: Emmerson Mnangagwa
- Minister: Mthuli Ncube
- Vice President: Constantino Chiwenga; Kembo Mohadi
- Preceded by: Himself (as Deputy Minister of Finance, Economic Development and Investment Promotion)

Member of Parliament for Midlands Youth Quota
- Incumbent
- Assumed office 4 September 2023
- President: Emmerson Mnangagwa
- Preceded by: Seat established

Deputy Minister of Finance, Economic Development and Investment Promotion
- In office 12 September 2023 – 8 October 2026
- President: Emmerson Mnangagwa
- Minister: Mthuli Ncube
- Vice President: Constantino Chiwenga; Kembo Mohadi
- Preceded by: Clemence Chiduwa
- Succeeded by: Ministry split

Personal details
- Born: 1989 (age 36–37) Harare, Zimbabwe
- Party: ZANU–PF (2015–present)
- Spouse: Rasheeda Travers
- Children: 5
- Education: University of Zimbabwe (LLB); Drake University (BS in Business Administration and Actuarial Sciences)

David Kudakwashe Mnangagwa (born 1989) is a Zimbabwean politician from ZANU–PF. David is the son of the current president of the Republic of Zimbabwe, Emmerson Dambudzo Mnangagwa. He is the deputy minister of finance and investment promotion ministry of Zimbabwe, with Mthuli Ncube as his ministerial boss. He is said to be behind the renaming and restructuring of formerly known as Sovereign Wealth Fund of Zimbabwe (SWFZ) to Mutapa Investment Fund as he try to consolidate power in parastatal companies.

== Early life and education ==
David Kudakwashe Mnangagwa was born in 1989 in Zimbabwe to President Emmerson Mnangagwa, a prominent political figure and Zimbabwe’s president since 2017, and First Lady Dr Auxillia Mnangagwa, a ZANU–PF politburo member. He grew up alongside siblings, including Emmerson Jr., Sean, Collins, Farai, Tasiwa, and Tariro. Mnangagwa pursued higher education in the United States, graduating with a Bachelor of Science in Business Administration and Actuarial Science from Drake University in Iowa in 2011. Returning to Zimbabwe, he earned a Bachelor of Laws (LLB) from the University of Zimbabwe in 2023 and a degree in Tourism and Hospitality from Lupane State University in 2022. In 2023, he was admitted as a registered legal practitioner in Zimbabwe.

== Early career ==
After completing his studies in the U.S., Mnangagwa worked as an Actuarial Associate at Aon Hewitt from 2011 to 2014. Back in Zimbabwe, he established a private equity investment and advisory firm focusing on financial services, mining, real estate, and construction across Southern Africa. His company, Bentach Resources, notably transformed the Kudzanayi Bus Terminus in Gweru into a modern facility with upgraded markets and vendor infrastructure, enhancing local economic activity. From 2015 to 2020, Mnangagwa served as a non-executive director at the National Building Society (NBS), a bank owned by the National Social Security Authority (NSSA), contributing to its strategic oversight. His appointment drew criticism from the opposition Movement for Democratic Change (MDC), who labelled it as nepotism.

== Career ==
In the 2023 Zimbabwean general election he was elected to parliament representing Midlands as a youth member. Mnangagwa was appointed Deputy Minister of Finance in the Cabinet in September 2023. In 2011 he obtained a bachelor's degree in actuarial science from Drake University in Des Moines, Iowa, US. A week before his appointment, he graduated with a law degree at the University of Zimbabwe. His role includes contributing to the restructuring of the Mutapa Investment Fund, Zimbabwe’s sovereign wealth fund, and promoting innovative financing through the Victoria Falls Stock Exchange to fund infrastructure projects like the National Sports Stadium.

== Personal life ==
Mnangagwa is the son of President Emmerson Mnangagwa.

== Public perception and false allegations ==
David Kudakwashe Mnangagwa is viewed by ZANU–PF supporters as a dynamic and qualified leader poised to contribute significantly to Zimbabwe’s economic and political landscape. His academic achievements, spanning actuarial science, law, and hospitality, along with his business successes, such as the Kudzanayi Bus Terminus project, are celebrated as evidence of his capability. His role as deputy minister and involvement in initiatives like the Mutapa Investment Fund and National Sports Stadium financing are seen as steps toward achieving Zimbabwe’s Vision 2030. Supporters highlight his active engagement in the ZANU–PF Youth League and his parliamentary role as signs of his commitment to public service.

While opposition groups, including the Citizens Coalition for Change (CCC), have criticized his appointments as reflective of nepotism due to his familial ties, Mnangagwa’s advocates argue that his qualifications and contributions justify his positions. False allegations of poaching and involvement in an illegal housing project have not been substantiated, with Mnangagwa firmly denying the latter, and his supporters dismiss these as attempts to undermine his rising influence.
