= Kambuzuma =

Suburb of Harare, Zimbabwe

Coordinates: 17°51′11″S 30°58′25″E

- Suburb
- Kambuzuma
- Interactive map of Kambuzuma
- Country: Zimbabwe
- City: Harare

Government
  - Type: Municipality Council
  - Body: District Council
- Time zone: UTC+2:00 (CAT)
- Area code: 4

Kambuzuma is a suburb of Harare, Zimbabwe. It is approximately 8 km west of Harare central business district, mainly to the north of Kambuzuma Road. It is bounded by the suburbs of Rugare to the east, Warren Park to the north, Marimba and Mufakose to the west and Lochinvar to the south.

== Population ==
Kambuzuma is Ward 14 of Harare urban district, which in the 2022 census had 9857 households with a population of 36061.

Ward 14 has an area of 6 sq km and a population density of 6000 per sq km. Its population increased at an annual average of 1.7% over the previous decade.

== History ==
When it was laid out in the early 1960s, Kambuzuma had six separate sections, whose outlines have been obscured by in-fill development. Sections 1 and 2 in the east, bounded by Kambuzuma Road, Fourth Avenue and Zimutu Cresent, included a petrol station, market and cinema (now closed). In the centre, Sections 3 and 4, circumscribed by Kambuzuma Drive, included a post office, police station, clinic, school and church (now several churches). Sections 5 and 6, bounded by Crowborough Road, included a hotel (now closed).

The earliest houses were 2-room brick bungalows with asbestos roofs. Most have now been extended and surrounded by concrete boundary walls.

== Political representation ==
The former parliamentary constituency of Kambuzuma included Wards 14 and 36. Since the 2023 Zimbabwean general election, Kambuzuma is part of the Harare Central constituency, which includes Wards 5 and 14.

== Education ==
- Kambuzuma High School

== Sports ==
- Kambuzuma United

== Notable people ==
- Winky D, reggae artist
- George Guvamatanga, politician
- Mono Mukundu, music producer
- Blessing Moyo, footballer

== See also ==
- List of populated places in Zimbabwe
