= Zimbabwe Revenue Authority =

The Zimbabwe Revenue Authority, or ZIMRA, is the body responsible for collecting taxes and other revenue streams for the government in Zimbabwe. It derives its mandate from the Revenue Authority Act, passed by the parliament of Zimbabwe in 2002 and other related legislation.

== Revenue collection ==
ZIMRA is responsible for assessing, collecting and accounting for revenue through the Ministry of Finance as specified by the Revenue Authority Act. The revenues and taxes administered by ZIMRA include:

- Income Tax
- Pay As You Earn (PAYE)
- Value Added Tax
- Withholding taxes
- Excise duty
- Special excise duty
- Capital gains tax
- Carbon tax
- Road tolls
- Surtax
- Stamp duty
- Customs duty
- Presumptive taxes

== Trade regulation ==
As part of its role in customs regulation, the authority monitors trade and all traffic through borders crossings, airports, and seaports. ZIMRA is tasked to reduce smuggling and illegal trade. The authority regulations on imports, exports and foreign exchange controls. As part of this duty, the agency regulates human travel.

The agency is responsible for overseeing motor vehicle trade and acts as a port authority, managing aspects of freight loading and unloading.

== Advisory ==
In addition to its role as a collector of taxes and revenue, the agency advises the legislature on enacting new revenue streams. In 2004, the agency spearheaded the introduction of the value added tax in Zimbabwe, replacing the sales tax. The agency in the past has endorsed the presumptive tax and road tolls, as well as new systems like Asycuda World and a self-assessment system of taxation.

== Corruption ==
The agency has been accused high levels of corruption, and many officials have been arrested.

== Recent news ==
Zimra missed its revenue collection target for the second quarter of 2013 by 6%, which the chairman said was down to economic setbacks.
