= Warren Park (constituency) =

Zimbabwean constituency

- National Assembly constituency for the Parliament of Zimbabwe
- District: Harare
- Province: Harare
- Electorate: 34,908 (2023)
- Major settlements: Warren Park

Current constituency
- Number of members: 1
- Party: Citizens Coalition for Change
- Member: Shakespear Hamauswa

Warren Park is a constituency represented in the National Assembly of the Parliament of Zimbabwe. The current MP is Shakespear Hamauswa of the Citizens Coalition for Change since the 2018 election.

== Members ==
Election	Name	Party
2013	Elias Mudzuri	MDC–T
2018	Peter Moyo	MDC Alliance
2023	Peter Moyo	Citizens Coalition for Change

== See also ==
- List of Zimbabwean parliamentary constituencies
