= List of finance ministers of Zimbabwe =

The minister of finance (or simply, finance minister) is the head of the Ministry of Finance of the Government of Zimbabwe. One of the senior-most offices in the Cabinet of Zimbabwe, the finance minister is responsible for the fiscal policy of the government. As part of this, a key duty of the finance minister is to present the annual Budget in Parliament of Zimbabwe, which details the government's plan for taxation (revenue collection) and spending in the coming financial year. Through the Budget, the finance minister also outlines the allocations to different ministries and departments. Occasionally, he is assisted by the minister of state for finance and the lower-ranked deputy minister of finance. This list includes all finance ministers of Zimbabwe since independence in 1980 to the present date:

- Enos Nkala, 1980 - 1982
- Bernard Chidzero, 1982 - 1995
- Ariston Chambati, April 1995 - October 1995
- Emmerson Mnangagwa, November 1995 - April 1996, acting
- Herbert Murerwa, April 1996 - July 2000
- Simba Makoni, July 2000 - August 2002
- Herbert Murerwa, August 2002 - February 2004
- Christopher Kuruneri, February 2004 - 26 April 2004
- Herbert Murerwa, 26 April 2004 - 6 February 2007
- Samuel Mumbengegwi, 6 February 2007 – December 2008
- Patrick Chinamasa, 7 January 2009 - 13 February 2009, acting
- Tendai Biti, February 2009 - July 2013
- Patrick Chinamasa, 11 September 2013 - 9 October 2017
- Ignatius Chombo, 10 October 2017 - 27 November 2017
- Patrick Chinamasa, 21 November 2017 - 7 September 2018
- Mthuli Ncube, 7 September 2018 to present

== See also ==
- Ministry of Finance (Zimbabwe)
- Ministry of Finance (Rhodesia)
