= Denford Magora =

Denford Magora is a novelist, playwright, analyst, advertising/marketing professional, politician and spokesman for Simba Makoni, presidential candidate in the Zimbabwe elections held in March 2008. He was born in Harare, Zimbabwe.

== Writing career ==
Magora first became known in the early 1990s after his play, Dr Government, was banned by the government of Robert Mugabe. Magora himself was harassed by state security agents and this eventually led him to move to the United Kingdom, where he wrote the novel Dancing Under A Stormcloud, published by Weidenfeld & Nicolson. He is also a columnist with The Financial Gazette, writes analysis and opinion articles for the Zimbabwe Independent, The Standard and the Mail & Guardian of South Africa. He maintains a blog on which he writes news, opinion and analysis articles on Zimbabwe.

== Political career ==
Magora's political career seems to have started seriously with his involvement in the campaign of Simba Makoni, when he was appointed spokesman and frequently commented on the presidential elections of March 2008. Prior to this, he did not identify with any political party, but was often criticised by readers of his articles for his criticism of Morgan Tsvangirai, the main opposition leader in Zimbabwe who beat Mugabe in March 2008 but failed to get enough votes to take office.
