= Blessing Moyo =

Zimbabwean footballer (born 1995)

Personal information
- Full name: Blessing Sasha Moyo
- Date of birth: 4 April 1995 (age 31)
- Place of birth: Kambuzuma, Zimbabwe
- Height: 1.80 m (5 ft 11 in)
- Position: Defender

Team information
- Current team: Simba Bhora

Senior career*
Years	Team	Apps	(Gls)
2013–2015	Dynamos		
2016	Harare City		
2016–2017	Maritzburg United	15	(0)
2018	Dynamos		
2019	TS Sporting	3	(0)
2019–2020	Real Kings	1	(0)
2021–2022	FC Platinum		
2022–present	Simba Bhora		

International career^{‡}
2014–2016	Zimbabwe	10	(0)
- * Club domestic league appearances and goals as of 1 September 2020 ‡ National team caps and goals as of 11 July 2026

Blessing Moyo (born 4 April 1995) is a Zimbabwean football defender who currently plays for Simba Bhora.

Starting his senior career in Dynamos, Moyo made his debut in 2013 and broke through in 2014. The team won the league titles in 2013 and 2014. Ahead of the 2016 season, he reportedly took a "more lucrative offer" and joined Harare City. In the summer of 2016 he was rumoured to move abroad, to South Africa and possibly the club Ajax Cape Town, but he was rather announced as a signing by Maritzburg United for a reported fee of R 400,000.

After one season, the contract was terminated. Moyo sought a return to Zimbabwe and Dynamos.

In 2019 he was back in South Africa with second-tier side TS Sporting. He also played for Real Kings.

In January 2021 he once again went back to Zimbabwe, this time to FC Platinum. He would strengthen the defence during continental matches. He was referred to as "the team’s engine room as the miners roared to a fourth title". His contract expired in December 2022.

In Moyo moved on to Simba Bhora, winning his fourth league title in 2024. He was present as Simba Bhora made their debut in CAF continental competition in the 2025–26 CAF Champions League qualifying rounds. In the summer of 2026 he underwent knee surgery.

Blessing Moyo should not be confused with the soccer manager of the same name plying his trade in Botswana.
