= Kudakwashe Tagwirei =

Zimbabwean businessman, advisor and philanthropist (born 1969)

The Honourable Kudakwashe Tagwirei Sen.

Minister of Economic Development and Investment Promotion
- Incumbent
- Assumed office 8 October 2026
- President: Emmerson Mnangagwa
- Deputy: Clemence Chiduwa
- Preceded by: New Ministry

Presidentially-appointed Senator
- Incumbent
- Assumed office 18 August 2026
- President: Emmerson Mnangagwa

Personal details
- Born: 12 February 1969 (age 57) Selukwe, Midlands Province, Rhodesia
- Spouse: Sandra Mupunga
- Children: Taonanyasha, Kudaira, Zachary, Tanaya
- Relatives: Phineas Tagwirei (father, deceased 2018)
- Education: Solusi University
- Occupation: Businessman, Philanthropist

Kudakwashe Regimond Tagwirei (born 12 February 1969) is a Zimbabwean senator, businessman, political advisor, and philanthropist. Since October 2026, he has also served as Minister of Economic Development and Investment Promotion, having been appointed to the position by President Emmerson Mnangagwa. He is the founder and former chief executive of Sakunda Holdings, a conglomerate with interests in energy, mining, agriculture, and infrastructure. Tagwirei has been a close advisor to President Emmerson Mnangagwa and has played a significant role in Zimbabwe's economic and political landscape since the 2017 coup that ousted Robert Mugabe. Tagwirei has faced international sanctions from the United States and United Kingdom since 2020 over allegations of corruption and close ties to senior government officials.

In recent years, Tagwirei has expanded his influence into politics, including his co-option into the ZANU–PF Central Committee in October 2025 amid speculation about his potential role in the party's succession dynamics.

== Early life and education ==
Tagwirei was born on 12 February 1969 in Selukwe, Midlands Province, Rhodesia. Little is publicly known about his early education, but he holds qualifications from Solusi University and worked in the mining sector before venturing into business in the early 2000s.

== Business career ==
Tagwirei founded Sakunda Holdings in 2005, initially focusing on fuel trading. The company grew rapidly, selling from 15,000 litres of fuel per month to around 60 million litres by the mid-2010s. In 2013, Sakunda entered a joint venture with Swiss commodities trader Trafigura, forming Trafigura Zimbabwe, in which Sakunda held a 51% stake. This partnership granted preferential access to Zimbabwe's fuel infrastructure, including the state-owned pipeline from Beira, Mozambique, and involved over $1 billion in prepayments to the National Oil Infrastructure Company (NOIC). Tagwirei reportedly earned at least $100 million in fees from Trafigura between 2014 and 2018 for services including market expertise and political connections. The joint venture controlled up to 80% of Zimbabwe's fuel imports until Trafigura bought out Tagwirei's stake in December 2019.

Sakunda expanded into agriculture through the government's Command Agriculture programme, securing a $3 billion contract between 2017 and 2019 to supply fuel and inputs, financed largely by government-issued Treasury bills. Tagwirei also ventured into mining through entities like Landela Mining Ventures and Sotic International, acquiring stakes in platinum, gold, nickel, and chrome mines. In 2019, Landela purchased a 50% stake in the Great Dyke Investments platinum mine for $220 million, using U.S. dollars obtained from redeemed Treasury bills. These assets were later restructured into Kuvimba Mining House, a public-private partnership. Tagwirei's business practices have involved complex corporate structures, including shell companies in Mauritius and the Cayman Islands, to manage investments and obscure ownership.

Tagwirei has also been involved in infrastructure projects through Fossil Contracting and has interests in manufacturing and other sectors.

== Political career ==
Tagwirei has long been associated with senior ZANU–PF officials, including President Mnangagwa and Vice President Constantino Chiwenga. He served as an advisor to Mnangagwa and has been described as a key financier of the president's political activities. In October 2025, Tagwirei was co-opted into the ZANU–PF Central Committee during the 386th session of the Politburo, marking his formal entry into party structures. During these internal ZANU–PF politburo exchanges, ZANU–PF Secretary for Legal Affairs Ziyambi Ziyambi publicly stated that Tagwirei had provided substantial logistical support to the military during the November 2017 coup - dubbed Operation Restore Legacy - that removed President Robert Mugabe. According to Ziyambi, at the request of then Defence Forces Commander General Constantino Chiwenga, Tagwirei supplied five million litres of fuel, food, and other provisions for soldiers, plus an additional one million litres of fuel and US$1.6 million to the party. This disclosure came in response to a dossier circulated by Vice President Chiwenga accusing Tagwirei and others of state capture.

His political rise has fueled speculation that Mnangagwa is grooming him as a potential successor, particularly amid the president's push for a term extension to 2030. This has led to internal party tensions, with figures like ZANU–PF spokesperson Christopher Mutsvangwa opposing Tagwirei's ascent. Tagwirei has been involved in the design of the Mutapa Investment Fund and is seen as a central figure in Mnangagwa's economic policies.

== Sanctions and controversies ==
Tagwirei has been subject to international sanctions due to allegations of corruption and close ties to Zimbabwe's leadership. On 5 August 2020, the U.S. Department of the Treasury sanctioned Tagwirei and Sakunda Holdings under Executive Order 13469, accusing him of providing material support to senior government officials and misappropriating $3 billion in public funds through the Command Agriculture programme. In July 2021, the United Kingdom followed suit, citing misappropriation of property through inflated Treasury bill redemptions.

In March 2024, the U.S. expanded sanctions to include Tagwirei, his wife Sandra, and associated businesses as part of a targeted programme against Zimbabwean leaders for corruption and human rights abuses. Investigative reports by organizations like The Sentry and OCCRP have highlighted Tagwirei's use of shell companies, offshore accounts, and preferential deals, including mining acquisitions involving military entities. Tagwirei has denied these allegations, describing them as misunderstandings.

Zimbabwean officials have criticized the sanctions as illegal and burdensome to the country's development.

In July 2024, Tagwirei was exonerated by a Zimbabwean commission of inquiry conducted by the Public Accounts Committee of the Zimbabwean Parliament, led by Tendai Biti. The committee cleared Tagwirei of allegations that he had embezzled $3 billion from the Command Agriculture program.

== Personal life ==
Tagwirei is married to Sandra Mpunga Tagwirei, and the couple has been included in U.S. sanctions lists. He is often referred to by the nickname "Queen Bee" in Zimbabwean media. Tagwirei is known for his philanthropy, including donations to health and education initiatives, though these have sometimes been linked to his political affiliations.
