= Christopher Kuruneri =

Zimbabwean politician (1949–2022)

Christopher Tichaona Kuruneri (4 April 1949 – 28 May 2022) was a Zimbabwean businessman, politician, lawyer, farmer and philanthropist. He was a Minister of Finance, Deputy Minister of Finance and Economic Development and member of parliament for Mount Darwin East. Kuruneri was a member of Zanu-PF. He owned Ascotvale farm in the Mazowe valley in Zimbabwe.

== Early life and education ==
Kuruneri was born in the Mbare District of Salisbury, Southern Rhodesia (now Harare, Zimbabwe), on 4 April 1949. His parents hail from the town of Mount Darwin in the Mashonaland Central Provincial District of Zimbabwe.

The last born of seven, Kuruneri went to high school at Goromonzi High School in Zimbabwe, where he obtained his GCSEs, excelling in Mathematics and Economics. He then obtained a scholarship sending him first to New York City, USA then to Simon Fraser University in Burnaby, Vancouver where he obtained his first degree. He then completed his studies at York University in Toronto, Ontario, where he obtained a PhD in economics. He then worked for the government of Ontario during the Zimbabwean war for independence.

== Career ==
Following the independence of Zimbabwe he moved back to Zimbabwe to work in the Ministry of Finance as an advisor for the Honourable Bernard Chidzero. He then transitioned to the Urban Development Corporation of Zimbabwe. He was falsely charged with corruption in the early 1990s when he was general manager of the Urban Development Corporation after he allegedly influenced the corporation to buy a property from Chris Mushonga, who he wanted to enter into business with, for $5 million. He was cleared of this case in November 1994. Mushonga had bought the property for $15 000 in 1984.

After selling his house on 30 Harare drive to the Canadian Embassy he bought Bromley Farm just outside Marondera, Zimbabwe.

In 1996 he sold the farm in Bromley and bought Asctovale farm in the Mazowe Valley, where he also ran as the local MP under Zanu PF. He was eventually elected as Deputy Finance Minister in 1999 then later Finance Minister of Zimbabwe in 2004. He was relieved by the government of his Cabinet position as Finance Minister after it was revealed that he spent millions purchasing two homes in Llandudno, Cape Town, which is a suburb popular with movie stars and wealthy businessmen. One of the houses, a six-bedroom double-storey overlooking the beach, was auctioned in February 2011. He has since been vindicated of any wrongdoing on his transactions in Cape Town.

From 2003 until 2005, Kuruneri was placed on the United States sanctions list.

On 24 April 2004, Kuruneri was arrested for externalising funds and was reported to have externalised US$1.082 million, 34 471 British pounds and 30 000 Euros.

Kuruneri made headlines in the South African Sunday Times when it broke a story that he was building a R30 million mansion in the exclusive suburb of Llandudno in Cape Town. It was also alleged that he also owned other properties in the same suburb which he bought for R2.7 million in 2002 and is reported to own shares in a block of apartments at Sea Point.

Kuruneri had two passports, one a Canadian one and at the time dual citizenship was prohibited in Zimbabwe. Though Kuruneri argued that what he did was above the law because he earned the money he used to buy the properties from consultancy work for Mobile Systems International and Felipe Solano, the law says if one earns any money while resident in Zimbabwe, that money must be brought into the country. He spent more than a year in remand prison and after 10 appeals for bail; Chief Justice Godfrey Chidyausiku released him on bail and he was later acquitted by the High Court in 2007.

Despite all the harassment, Kuruneri has remained a loyal Zanu PF member, Kuruneri stood in Mount Darwin East election in the 31 July 2013 polls and his electoral victory made it possible for him to make his way back to the National Assembly, but failed to catapult him into Cabinet after he was overlooked by Robert Mugabe.

== Personal life ==
Kuruneri married Dr. Titi Violet Palesa Mohapi in Edmonton, Canada, having one child by her. Dr. Mohapi died in 2014, having the Dr Titi Mohapi Day Care Centre founded in her honour in Maseru, Lesotho. Kuruneri subsequently remarried in Harare, Zimbabwe and had two daughters.

Kuruneri also fathered 4 other children who reside in the UK, Canada and France.

On 19 May 2016, Kuruneri collapsed in Parliament from an undisclosed ailment.
