= Patrick Chinamasa =

Zimbabwean politician

The Right Honourable Patrick Chinamasa MP
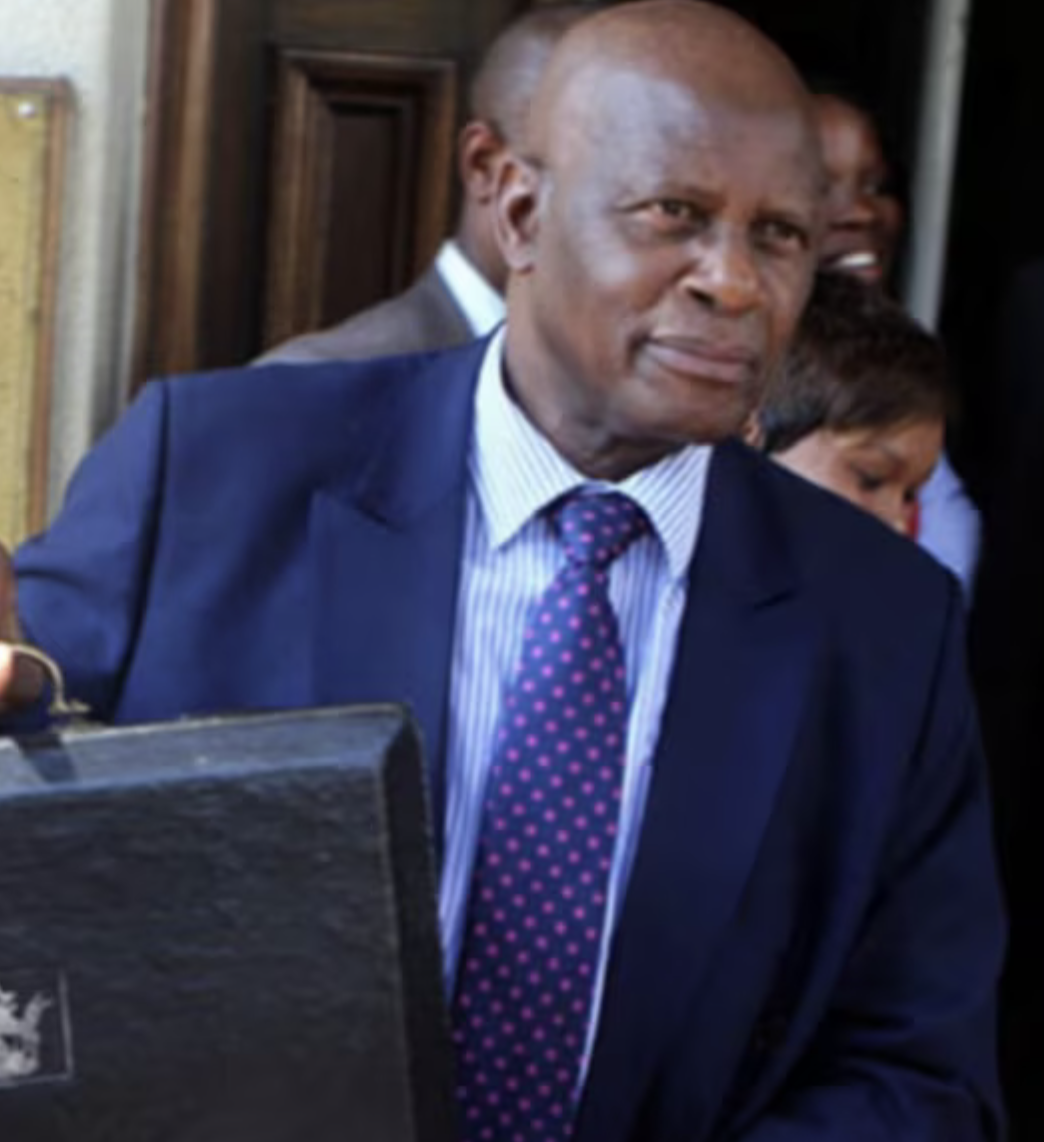

Minister of Finance and Economic Planning
- In office 27 November 2017 – 9 September 2018; Acting: 27 November 2017 – 30 November 2017
- President: Emmerson Mnangagwa
- Deputy: Terence Mukupe
- Preceded by: Ignatius Chombo
- Succeeded by: Mthuli Ncube
- In office 10 September 2013 – 9 October 2017; Minister of Finance and Economic Development
- President: Robert Mugabe
- Preceded by: Tendai Biti
- Succeeded by: Ignatius Chombo
- In office 7 January 2009 – 13 February 2009; Minister of Finance; Acting
- President: Robert Mugabe
- Preceded by: Samuel Mumbengegwi
- Succeeded by: Tendai Biti

Minister of Justice, Legal and Parliamentary Affairs
- In office July 2000 – September 2013
- President: Robert Mugabe
- Deputy: Jessie Majome
- Succeeded by: Emmerson Mnangagwa

Personal details
- Born: 25 January 1947 (age 79) Southern Rhodesia
- Party: ZANU–PF
- Spouse: Monica Chinamasa
- Children: 2 (1 deceased)

Patrick Antony Chinamasa (born 25 January 1947) is a Zimbabwean politician who served in the government of Zimbabwe as the minister of various cabinet ministries. Previously he served as the Minister of Finance and Investment Promotion and the Minister of Justice, Legal and Parliamentary Affairs.

On 9 October 2017, he was appointed as Minister of the newly created Ministry of Cyber Security, Threat Detection and Mitigation. On 27 November 2017, Emmerson Mnangagwa, who succeeded Robert Mugabe as President of Zimbabwe following the 2017 Zimbabwean coup d'état, appointed Chinamasa as the nation's acting Finance Minister. He was substantively returned to his portfolio as Minister of Finance and Economic Development in Mnangagwa's first cabinet on 30 November 2017.

== Political career ==
A leading member of the ruling ZANU–PF party, Chinamasa became first deputy Agriculture Minister, and then Attorney General of Zimbabwe; he also has held the role of Leader of the Zimbabwean Parliament.

Following his appointment, many Zimbabwean judges resigned, complaining of political pressure. On 9 February 2001 after Chief Justice Anthony Gubbay took early retirement at his suggestion, Chinamasa held meetings with senior Justices Ahmed Ebrahim and Nicholas McNally (the last white justice on the Zimbabwean Court), and told them for their own safety to leave.

In 2002, following what Chinamasa considered lenient conviction of three American citizens caught and convicted of smuggling arms in an aircraft, Zimbabwean High Court judge Fergus Blackie brought successful charges against Chinamasa for a conviction of "scandalising the court." Chinamasa had Blackie immediately arrested on charges of "corruption," on the grounds of having decided the case of a white woman improperly (on the basis of an alleged adulterous relationship and racist bias), and without the support of the other judge that was sitting with him on the matter. After the case closed, Chinamasa declared various NGO's illegal, including leading Human Rights organisation the Amani Trust which provides support to victims of torture; and was reportedly accused of working with the British government to unseat President Robert Mugabe and destabilise the nation.

In 2003, Chinamasa was placed on European Union and United States sanctions lists.

On 17 December 2004, Chinamasa, who had been the Secretary for Legal Affairs of ZANU PF, was removed from the party's Politburo. In 2005, Chinamasa was ejected from his post as Justice Minister; however, six months later he was returned to the post.

In September 2006, Chinamasa was cleared by a judge of trying to pervert the course of justice. Chinamasa was accused of trying to stop a prosecution witness, James Kaunye, from testifying in a case against the Minister of State for National Security, Didymus Mutasa, who had been accused of inciting public violence.

He is among a host of individuals not allowed to travel to the USA because the USA government feels he has worked to undermine democracy in Zimbabwe.

Chinamasa and Labour Minister Nicholas Goche met with Tendai Biti (MDC-T) and Welshman Ncube (MDC-M), Secretaries General of their respective Movement for Democratic Change factions, in Pretoria, South Africa on 16 June 2007. South African President Thabo Mbeki, appointed by the Southern African Development Community, presided over the negotiations which sought to end economic sanctions on Zimbabwe.

Chinamasa was nominated as ZANU–PF's candidate for the House of Assembly seat from Makoni Central in the March 2008 parliamentary election, but he was defeated. Chinamasa received 4 050 votes against 7,060 for John Nyamande of the Movement for Democratic Change (MDC).

Within ZANU-PF, Chinamasa has been seen as an ally of Emmerson Mnangagwa since 2004. As of 2008, Chinamasa is the Chairman of ZANU PF's Information and Publicity Sub-Committee, and in that capacity he acted as spokesman for ZANU PF in the period following the 2008 presidential and parliamentary election. In this respect, he was viewed as taking over the roles of Minister of Information and Publicity Sikhanyiso Ndlovu and ZANU–PF Secretary for Information and Publicity Nathan Shamuyarira.

Along with Goche, Chinamasa was one of the negotiators sent by ZANU–PF to the talks between political parties that began in Pretoria on 10 July 2008, following Mugabe's disputed re-election.

Chinamasa was appointed to the Senate by Mugabe on 25 August 2008. On 7 January 2009, The Herald reported that Chinamasa had been appointed as Acting Minister of Finance following the dismissal of Samuel Mumbengegwi, who no longer held a seat in Parliament. In this position, Chinamasa took a historic step in the ongoing hyperinflation crisis in Zimbabwe, announcing that all Zimbabweans would be allowed to conduct business in any currency as of the end of January 2009.

When the ZANU-PF–MDC national unity government was sworn in on 13 February 2009, Chinamasa was retained as Minister of Justice.

Following Mugabe's victory in the July 2013 presidential election, he moved Chinamasa to the post of Minister of Finance on 10 September 2013.

Later, Patrick Chinamasa was moved to a newly created ministry of Cyber Security in 2017. The Ministry of Cyber Security, Threat Detection and Mitigation was announced and initiated by President Robert Mugabe in October 2017 to address the challenges of new generation of technologies. Patrick was reassigned to the role of Minister of Cyber Security, Threat Detection and Mitigation where he led efforts to ensure cybersecurity through various end points.

In 2017, when Zimbabwe's new president Emmerson Mnangagwa took over, he named Patrick Chinamasa as the acting Finance Minister until the appointment of a new cabinet and minister.

=== Farms ===
In February 2003, Chinamasa sent the police to arrest Peter Baker, a white farmer who had refused to vacate his farm, Rocklands, in favour of the Minister, after successfully challenging its seizure in court. Eight months after the seizure, the farm's water supply has been squandered, undermining its future productivity and that of the neighbouring farms.

In September 2003, white farmer Richard Yates was evicted from his 800-hectare tobacco farm Tsukumai Farm at Headlands, located east of Harare. Although Chinamasa paid some compensation, Yates is still awaiting final payment and said that he considers the farm his in an interview with the Daily Telegraph. The following year his wife Monica won the Zimbabwean Tobacco grower of the year award, together with a Z$24million prize and trophy as the 2004/2005 top grower at a ceremony in Harare on 29 July. British MP Kate Hoey, who made a fact-finding visit to Zimbabwe earlier in the year, said the award was shocking: "It is like someone stealing a race horse and winning the Grand National." As a result, London based British American Tobacco came under pressure to stop its Zimbabwean associate company sponsoring the award, which it did the following year.

=== Personal life ===
Chinamasa is married to Monica Chinamasa. His children include:

- Chengetai – although banned from travelling into the United States, he gained entry using his mother's maiden surname. He claimed his home location as Worcester, Massachusetts, where he studied and also worked for Keller Williams. He died in November 2007.
- Gamuchirai - born 11 November 1991.
