= Ignatius Chombo =

Zimbabwean politician (born 1952)

The Right Honourable Ignatius Chombo MP
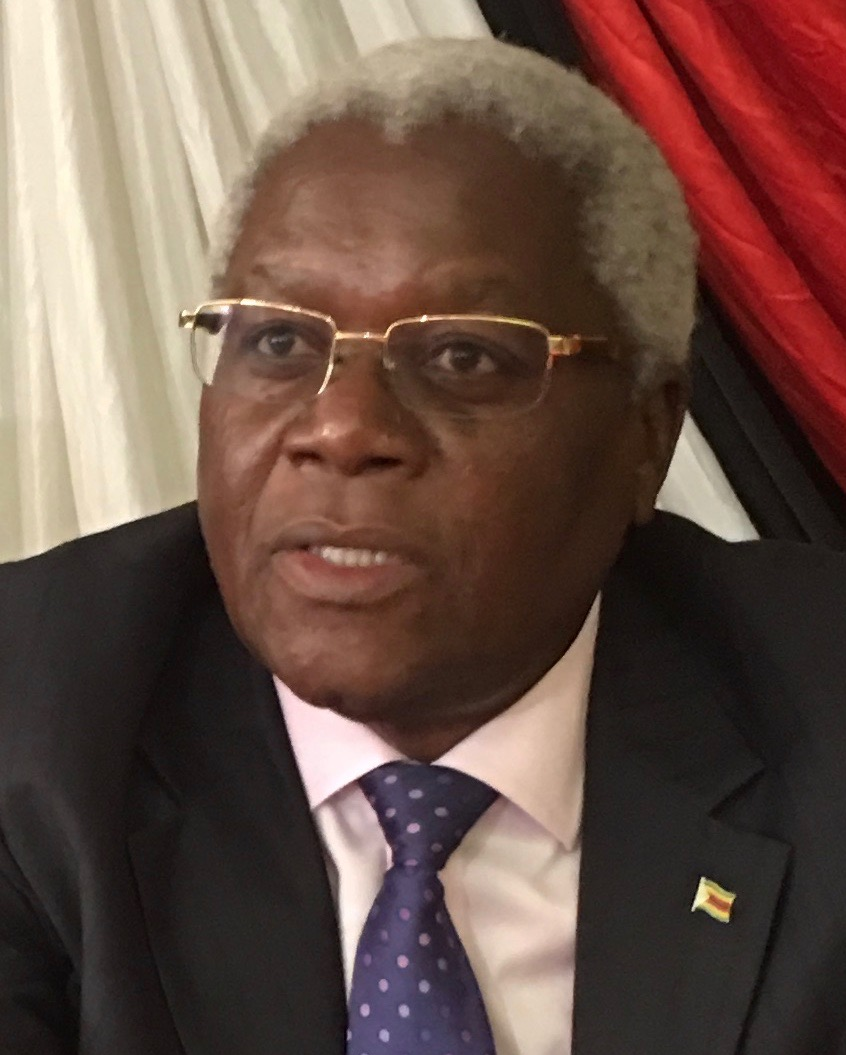

Minister of Finance and Economic Development
- In office 9 October 2017 – 27 November 2017
- President: Robert Mugabe; Emmerson Mnangagwa
- Preceded by: Patrick Chinamasa
- Succeeded by: Patrick Chinamasa

Minister of Home Affairs
- In office 6 July 2015 – 9 October 2017
- President: Robert Mugabe
- Preceded by: Kembo Mohadi
- Succeeded by: Obert Mpofu

Minister of Local Government, Public Works and National Housing
- In office 2013 – 6 July 2015
- President: Robert Mugabe
- Deputy: Sesel Zvidzai
- Succeeded by: Saviour Kasukuwere

Minister of Local Government, Rural and Urban Development
- In office 2009–2013
- President: Robert Mugabe
- Prime Minister: Morgan Tsvangirai

Minister of Local Government, Public Works and Urban Development
- In office July 2000 – 2009
- President: Robert Mugabe

Personal details
- Born: Ignatius Morgen Chiminya Chombo; 1 August 1952 (age 73) Southern Rhodesia
- Party: ZANU-PF
- Spouse: Marian Chombo (m. 1993; div. 2012)

Ignatius Morgen Chiminya Chombo (1 August 1952) is a former Zimbabwean politician who was Finance Minister of Zimbabwe in 2017. Previously he has served in the Cabinet of Zimbabwe as Minister of Home Affairs from 2015 to 2017, Minister of Local Government, Public Works and Urban Development from 2000 to 2015.

== Political career ==
During his time as Minister of Local Government, Public Works and Urban Development, a forcible slum clearance, Operation Murambatsvina, was carried out. He claimed the operation was about restoring order.

Chombo was nominated as ZANU-PF's candidate for the House of Assembly seat from Zvimba North, in Mashonaland West, in the March 2008 parliamentary election. He won the seat with 6,784 votes in the initial count, defeating two candidates of the Movement for Democratic Change: Ernest Mudimu (MDC-T), who received 1,701 votes, and Magama Shelton (MDC-M), who received 944 votes. The MDC challenged this result, and a recount in April showed Chombo with an improved margin of victory: he gained 155 votes in the recount, Mudimu gained 13 votes, and Magama lost 28 votes.

When The ZANU-PF–MDC national unity government was sworn in on 13 February 2009, Chombo was retained as Minister of Local Government.

President Mugabe moved Chombo to the post of Minister of Home Affairs on 6 July 2015. In October 2017, he was appointed Finance Minister in a cabinet reshuffle.

Chombo, Mugabe, and other prominent ZANU-PF politicians were detained by the Zimbabwean military during the 2017 Zimbabwean coup d'état. It was alleged that he was close to the Generation 40 faction led by former First Lady Grace Mugabe. After Mugabe resigned as President of Zimbabwe, allegations emerged that Chombo had been taken to hospital following his treatment in custody. Chombo's lawyer stated he was beaten in custody; the police deny this. Chombo faces charges for alleged corruption dating back more than a decade.

On 19 November 2017, Chombo was expelled from ZANU–PF by the party's central committee. Other prominent G40 politicians, including Grace Mugabe, Saviour Kasukuwere, Patrick Zhuwao, Walter Mzembi, Jonathan Moyo, Shadreck Mashayamombe, Makhosini Hlongwane, Innocent Hamandishe, Samuel Undenge, and Sarah Mahoka were also expelled from the party. It was also announced on 27 November 2017 that new Zimbabwe President Emmerson Mnangagwa, who succeeded Mugabe following the coup d'état, had appointed Patrick Chinamasa as the acting Minister of Finance.

He was placed on the European Union and United States sanctions lists in 2003.

== Court cases ==
He was taken into police custody on 24 November 2017 and appeared on the next day over accusations of corruption and abuse of power during his tenure as Minister of Local Government, Public Works and Urban Development. Per the state prosecutor, he faced three counts of corruption, including attempt to defraud the Zimbabwean central bank in 2004. New charges of corruption were brought against him on 14 December. According to his lawyer Lovemore Madhuku, the case refers to accusations of illegally resettling people evicted by the government on privately owned land and then demanding bribe from the owner to make them leave.
