= Amani Trust =

The Amani Trust was a Zimbabwean non-profit non-governmental organization dedicated to preventing organized violence and torture, to advocacy for the rights of victims and to rehabilitation of victims through community-based care. It was established in 1993 and had its headquarters in Harare. The organisation has now closed.

In 2002, Justice Minister Patrick Chinamasa declared various NGO's illegal, including the Amani Trust; the Trust was also accused of working with the British government to unseat President Robert Mugabe and destabilize the nation.
