= Democrats (film) =

- Film poster
- Directed by: Camilla Nielsson
- Produced by: Henrik Veileborg
- Cinematography: Henrik Bohn Ipsen
- Edited by: Jeppe Bodskov
- Music by: Kristian Eidnes Andersen
- Production company: Upfront Films
- Release date: November 6, 2014 (CPH:DOX)
- Running time: 99 minutes
- Country: Denmark
- Language: English

Democrats is a 2014 Danish documentary film directed by Camilla Nielsson about politics in Zimbabwe following the contentious 2008 election and the subsequent coalition effort to rewrite the country's constitution.

== Synopsis ==
Following the contentious 2008 Presidential election in Zimbabwe, a coalition that includes Paul Mangwana and Douglas Mwonzora work to rewrite the Zimbabwean constitution.

== Release ==
Democrats played at the Copenhagen International Documentary Festival on September 6, 2014.

== Reception ==
Rotten Tomatoes, a review aggregator, reports that 100% of 22 surveyed critics gave the film a positive review; the average rating is 8.4/10. Metacritic rated it 88/100 based on eight reviews, indicating "Universal acclaim". Guy Lodge of Variety wrote, "Even the slyest political satire couldn't outdo this riveting docu study of Zimbabwe's troubled coalition government." John DeFore of The Hollywood Reporter called it both accessible and academically useful. Glenn Kenny of The New York Times made it a NYT Critics' Pick and called it an "outstanding, unsettling documentary".

Among other awards, the film won Best Documentary at the Tribeca Film Festival, Best Director at the One World Human Rights Film Festival, Best International Documentary at the Hot Springs Documentary Film Festival, Special Jury Mention and Reel Talent Award at the Copenhagen International Documentary Festival, and Best Documentary at the Nordisk Panorama Film Festival.

Nielsson followed up Democrats with the film President which explores the controversial 2018 presidential election in Zimbabwe; opposition leader Nelson Chamisa says there was voting fraud and claims he won the presidency. The government in the country has banned President from being shown. The movie won the World Cinema Documentary Special Jury Award at the Sundance Film Festival.
