= Makoni Central =

Parliamentary constituency in Zimbabwe

- Constituency for the National Assembly of Zimbabwe
- Province: Manicaland
- Region: Makoni District

Current constituency
- Created: 2008
- Seats: 1
- Party: Citizens Coalition for Change
- Member(s): Patrick Sagandira

Makoni Central is a constituency represented in the National Assembly of the Parliament of Zimbabwe, located in Manicaland Province. Its current MP since the 2023 general election is Patrick Sagandira of the Citizens Coalition for Change.

== Electoral history ==
Makoni Central was a newly-created constituency in the March 2008 parliamentary election.

Justice Minister Patrick Chinamasa was the ZANU–PF candidate for the seat in the 2008 election. He lost to the Movement for Democratic Change (MDC) candidate John Nyamande. Dunmore Kusano, an independent candidate, came third.

General Election 2008: Makoni Central
Party	Candidate	Votes	%	±%
MDC–T	John Nyamande	7060	56.84	
ZANU–PF	Patrick Chinamasa	4055	32.65	
Independent	Dunmore Kusano	1305	10.51	
Majority		3005	24.19	
Turnout		12420		

In the 2018 general election, David Tekeshe of the Movement for Democratic Change Alliance was elected MP for the constituency.

== See also ==
- List of Zimbabwean parliamentary constituencies
