= Bernard Chidzero =

Zimbabwean economist, politician, writer (1927–2002)

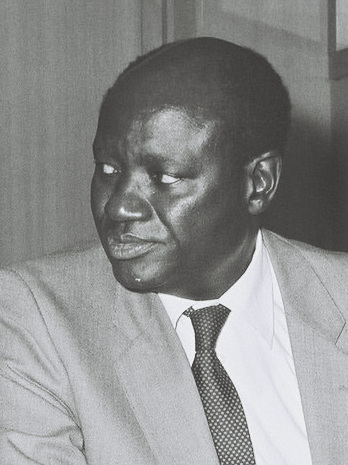
- Chidzero in 1980

Finance Minister of Zimbabwe
- In office 1982–1995
- Preceded by: Tichaendepi Masaya
- Succeeded by: Ariston Chambati

Personal details
- Born: Bernard Thomas Gibson Chidzero; 1 July 1927
- Died: 8 August 2002 (aged 75)
- Education: University of Ottawa

Bernard Thomas Gibson Chidzero (1 July 1927 – 8 August 2002) was a Zimbabwean economist, politician, and writer. He was independent Zimbabwe's second finance minister.

== Early life and education ==
Bernard Thomas Gibson Chidzero was the eldest of seven children. His father, a Malawian, James Kangolwa Imfa Idzalero, was originally from Ntchisi, in Malawi who walked to Rhodesia, in 1913, stopping over on tea estates in Southern Malawi as well as performing menial labour on the Beira-Dondo railway line. His mother Agnes Munhumumwe was from the Shona people. Chidzero grew up primarily speaking chiShona, though by adulthood was also fluent in English. Bernard Chidzero was raised in the Seke area of Chitungwiza. He was schooled at primary school in Seke and then at Kutama College (a prestigious Roman Catholic high school), where he played in the school band alongside fellow pupil Robert Mugabe. Chidzero converted to Catholicism while at Kutama. He then attended St. Francis College in Mariannhill in South Africa.

Chidzero obtained a degree in psychology from Pius XII Catholic University College in Lesotho, an MA in political science from the University of Ottawa in 1955, and in 1958 a PhD in political science from McGill University in Montreal, where he married a French-Canadian woman.

He then undertook two years post-graduate study at Nuffield College, Oxford. Early on Chidzero became interested in African politics and as a Pan Africanist he became friends, in the London African circuit, with future leaders including Jomo Kenyatta, Kwame Nkrumah, Hastings Kamuzu Banda, Seretse Khama.

== Career ==
In 1957 Chidzero published a Shona novel Nzvengamutsvairo (the name has been translated from Shona as "Mr Lazy-Bones" or "Broom-Dodger") which detailed the condition of workers on Rhodesian farms and set out his vision of an integrated, racially tolerant society.

Armed with a grant from the Ford Foundation, Chidzero returned to Rhodesia in 1960, intending to teach at the University of Rhodesia and Nyasaland; his offer to work there was withdrawn when the segregated university discovered the interracial nature of Chidzero's marriage.

Chidzero joined the United Nations in 1960. He began in the United Nations Economic Commission for Africa as an economic affairs officer in Addis Ababa and from 1963 to 1968 as an assistant to the UN Technical Assistance Board in Kenya. From 1968 to 1980 Chidzero worked for the United Nations Conference on Trade and Development (UNCTAD): from 1968 to 1977 he was the Director of Commodities and between 1977 and 1980 he served as UNCTAD's Deputy Secretary General

After the 1965 Unilateral Declaration of Independence by Ian Smith, Chidzero played a role in the early negotiations for Zimbabwe. He was part of the advisory team when Joshua Nkomo leader of Zimbabwe African People's Party visited London. The collapse of those talks, resulting in the split of ZAPU and Zimbabwe African National Union (ZANU), also marked a watershed in Chidzero's political allegiances. Increasingly, he teamed up with his former school- and band-mate Mugabe.

Aware of impending violence in Zimbabwe, in 1970, Chidzero bought a farm in Malawi and moved his father and kinsfolk out of Rhodesia. On 21 December 1972 the first armed attack on a Rhodesian white settler took place in Centenary, Zambezi River escarpment. Meanwhile, during a visit to Malawi in 1972, Chidzero made overtures to his Pan African 'brother' and 'friend' Hastings Kamuzu Banda to settle in Malawi when his United Nations tenure expired. Hastings Kamuzu Banda's response was an unequivocal refusal. Still, the farm in Malawi continued to serve, with the Malawi Government turning a blind eye, as an active Zimbabwean cell and staging point for many recruits heading for Morogoro training bases, in Tanzania.

Following the Lancaster House Agreement Chidzero returned to Zimbabwe and, in 1980, he became the Minister of Economic Planning and Development. In the 1985 election he was elected as the Member of Parliament for Harare, representing ZANU-PF. Following the election he was promoted to be the Minister of Finance, succeeding Tichaendepi Masaya.

He was Chairman of the Development Committee of the World Bank from 1986 to 1990. He was a member of the World Commission on Environment and Development. Back home he designed and implemented the Zimbabwean version of the Structural Adjustment Programme; in the process earning himself the wrath of certain ZANU-PF stalwarts who considered his economic programs ill-timed and denying them access to 'rewards of their war effort'.

In 1990, aware of the disaster that the Zimbabwean economy was headed for and vilified and accused for SAP's 'failures' by those within the ruling party, a frustrated Chidzero ran for election to the post of Secretary-General of the United Nations. Chidzero was supported by the United Kingdom and many Commonwealth countries, but was defeated by Boutros Boutros-Ghali.

Throughout 1991 and 1992, Chidzero said the only foreign country to really help Zimbabwe financially was the United Kingdom, Chidzero attributed this to the decision's of Prime Minister John Major, who Chidzero said "Refused to give up on Zimbabwe after most of the west had basically decided to do so." Chidzero went on to say "The British always answered the phone when we called. The Americans mostly did, at least before 1993. The French basically never did, and when they did they never gave a straight answer on anything." Chidzero's health began to fail in 1993 and he stepped down as finance minister in 1995. Bernard Chidzero died in the Avenues Clinic in Harare in 2002. He is buried in the Heroes' Acre in Harare.

== Bibliography ==
- Nzvengamutsvairo, 1957
- Partnership in practice, Sword of the Spirit, 1960
- Tanganyika and international trusteeship, Oxford University Press, 1961
- The imperative of international co-operation, East African Publishing for East African Academy, 1966
- Education and the challenge of independence, International University Exchange Fund, 1977
