= Mutapa Investment Fund =

Sovereign wealth fund in Zimbabwe

- Type: Government owned
- Industry: Diversified investments
- Founded: 2020
- Headquarters: Norton, Zimbabwe
- Area served: Zimbabwe
- Key people: Mthuli Ncube, Finance Minister; Kuda Mnangagwa, Deputy Finance Minister; Chipo Mutasa, Board Chairman; John Mangudya, CEO; Simbarashe Chinyemba, CIO
- Revenue: not disclosed
- Operating income: not disclosed
- Net income: not disclosed
- Total assets: $16 billion (2024)
- Owner: Government of Zimbabwe
- Number of employees: not disclosed yet
- Parent: Finance Ministry

Mutapa Investment Fund, formerly known as the Sovereign Wealth Fund of Zimbabwe is a Zimbabwean sovereign wealth fund formulated by the Sovereign Wealth Fund Act (Chapter 22:20). It was renamed after the re-election of Emmerson Dambudzo Mnangagwa as the president of Zimbabwe, doing so by using Statutory Instrument 156 of 2023. It is a state-owned investment fund established from the balance of payment surpluses, official foreign currency operations, the proceeds of privatisation, government transfer payments, fiscal surpluses and resource earnings. It manages 20 parastatal entities.

== History ==
In 2013, the parliament of Zimbabwe drafted the Sovereign Wealth Fund Bill. It was then passed and the SWFZ come into existence in 2014.

== Controversies ==
There is a lot of outcry among people from various groups concerning the renaming and restructuring of Mutapa Investment Fund. These people includes journalists, tribal extremist and politicians.

== Entities Managed ==
- Net*one Cellular (Private) Limited
- National Railways of Zimbabwe
- Air Zimbabwe
- TelOne
- Cottco
- Zupco
- Defold Mine
- Kuvimba Mining House
- Silo investments
- National Oil Company of Zimbabwe
- Cold Storage Commission Limited
- Petrotrade
- People's Own Savings Bank
- ZESA
- Fidelity Gold Refinery
- Homelink
- Arda Seeds
- Zimbabwe Power Company
- PowerTel Communications
- Allied Timbers
- Telecel
- Industrial Development Corporation
- Hwange Colliery Company
