= Warren Park, Harare =

Coordinates: 17°50′00″S 30°58′20″E

Warren Park is a densely populated suburb in southwest Harare, Zimbabwe. It borders Belvedere, Westwood, Westlea, Tynwald and Saint Andrews Park and is one of the more affordable areas in Harare.

== History ==
Warren Park was named after cousins Robert and Hebert Warren who emigrated to Zimbabwe from the Eastern Cape, South Africa. They pegged their farm south of the city limits in what is now present-day Warren Park. Hebert sold the farm in 1892 after Robert contracted blackwater fever and died in November 1891, which was then subdivided into residential units and incorporated in the municipality by the First World War.

== Character ==
Today Warren Park is probably best known for its proximity to Warren Hills Golf Club and the National Sports Stadium, both of which are close to Warren Pak, but lie outside its borders in Saint Andrews Park and Westlea. Additionally, the area's affordable housing, makes it a popular area for arrival from other parts of the country, seeking opportunity, and migrants from Malawi and the DRC.

== Politics ==
Warren Park is part of the Warren Park constituency for elections to the Parliament of Zimbabwe.
