= Dairibord =

Milk and dairy products producer based in Zimbabwe

Logo

Dairibord Zimbabwe Ltd is a milk and dairy products producer, based in Zimbabwe, southern Africa.

Dairibord is one of the largest food producers in southern Africa, and was the former state Dairy Marketing Board; it was privatised in 1997. The company has seven factories: in Harare, Chitungwiza, Bulawayo, Gweru, Kadoma, Mutare and Chipinge. It also owns Lyons Zimbabwe, a food company manufacturing beverages, ice creams, cordials, condiments, sauces and spreads; the biscuit and baking company M.E. Charhons, and has a majority stake in Dairibord Malawi.

Since January 2006 the company has been known as DZL Holdings Ltd.
