= Ministry of Economic Development and Investment Promotion =

Government ministry

Ministry overview
- Formed: 8 October 2026; 34 days ago
- Preceding Ministry: Ministry of Finance, Economic Development and Investment Promotion
- Jurisdiction: Government of Zimbabwe
- Headquarters: 3rd Floor, Block B, Mgandane Dlodlo Building, Corner Central Avenue and Simon Muzenda Street, Harare; 17.824209622253246°S 31.052323348462235°E
- Minister responsible: Kudakwashe Tagwirei, Minister of Economic Development and Investment Promotion
- Deputy Minister responsible: Clemence Chiduwa, Deputy Minister of Economic Development and Investment Promotion

The Ministry of Economic Development and Investment Promotion, formerly part of the Ministry of Finance, Economic Development and Investment Promotion, is a government ministry in Zimbabwe responsible for driving economic growth, attracting investment and strengthening productive sectors.

The incumbent Minister is Kudakwashe Tagwirei and the deputy minister is Clemence Chiduwa. It is headquartered at Treasury House at New Government Complex in Harare.

== See also ==
- Ministry of Finance (Zimbabwe)
