= Zimbabwe and the International Monetary Fund =

Republic of Zimbabwe initially joined the Fund on 3 February 1995. It holds a quota of 706.8 million SDRs which translates to 0.17% of the total SDRs.

== 2005 Loan repayment ==
In 2005, Zimbabwe made a mystery loan repayment of US$120 million to the International Monetary Fund due to expulsion threat from IMF.

Zimbabwe in 2005 was economically torn down, in the midst of serious economic crisis; collapsing currency, de-investment, hunger and droughts, shortages of critical food supplies among others. This dates back to 1990s and early 2000s crisis and Zimbabwe's involvement in the war of Congo. Zimbabwe took a credit from IMF and went to war in Congo.
