= Clemence Chiduwa =

Zimbabwean politician

The Hon. Clemence Chiduwa MP

Deputy Minister of Economic Development and Investment Promotion
- Incumbent
- Assumed office 11 November 2026
- President: Emmerson Mnangagwa
- Minister: Kudakwashe Tagwirei
- Preceded by: New Ministry

Member of Parliament for Zaka South
- Incumbent
- Assumed office 4 September 2023
- President: Emmerson Mnangagwa
- Preceded by: New Constituency
- Constituency: Zaka South
- Majority: 8,627 (43.8%)

Member of Parliament for Zaka East
- In office 21 September 2019 – 22 August 2023
- President: Emmerson Mnangagwa
- Preceded by: Kaston Ringirisai Gumbwanda
- Succeeded by: Constituency suppressed
- Constituency: Zaka East

Personal details
- Party: ZANU-PF

Clemence Chiduwa is a Zimbabwean politician, serving as the Member of Parliament for Zaka South and current Deputy Minister of Economic Development and Investment Promotion. He was elected to the National Assembly during the 2023 general election to the new Constituency of Zaka South, having previously served as MP for Zaka East.
