= Mthuli Ncube =

Zimbabwean economist and politician

The Honourable Prof. Mthuli Ncube
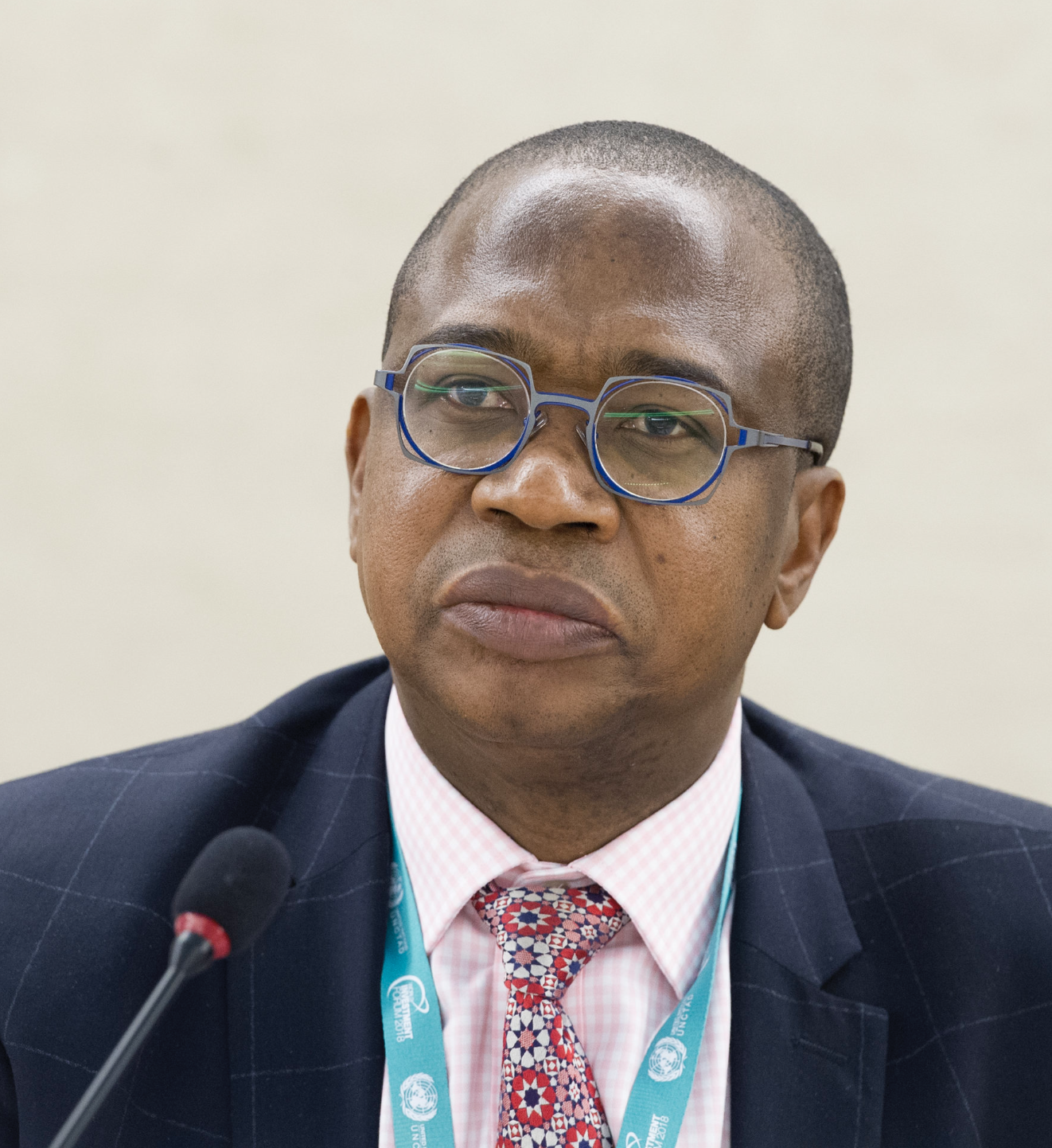
- Ncube in 2018

Minister of Finance of Zimbabwe
- Incumbent
- Assumed office 8 October 2026
- President: Emmerson Mnangagwa
- Deputy: David Kudakwashe Mnangagwa
- Preceded by: Himself (as Minister of Finance and Investment Promotion of Zimbabwe)

Minister of Finance and Investment Promotion of Zimbabwe
- In office 10 September 2018 – 8 October 2026
- President: Emmerson Mnangagwa
- Deputy: David Kudakwashe Mnangagwa
- Preceded by: Patrick Chinamasa
- Succeeded by: Ministry split

Personal details
- Born: 30 November 1964 (age 61) Bulawayo, Southern Rhodesia
- Education: Cambridge University

Mthuli Ncube (born 30 November 1964), is the Finance Minister in the Zimbabwe cabinet appointed by president Emmerson Mnangagwa and past chief economist and Vice President of the African Development Bank. He holds a PhD in Mathematical Finance from Cambridge University. On 7 September 2018, President Emmerson Mnangagwa announced Zimbabwe's new cabinet where he named Professor Mthuli Ncube as the Finance Minister.

In the 2023 Zimbabwean general election, Ncube lost the newly created seat of Cowdray Park to Pasho Raphael Sibanda from the Citizens Coalition for Change.

== Academic career ==
Before joining the bank, he was dean and professor of finance at Wits Business School and then dean of the faculty of Commerce, Law and Management at the University of the Witwatersrand (Wits) as well as a lecturer in finance at the London School of Economics.

He has published books, papers and articles in economics, political economy and finance. His books include Mathematical Finance: Option and Asset Pricing; South African Dictionary of Finance (editor); Financial Systems and Monetary Policy in Africa; Development Dynamics: Theories and Lessons from Zimbabwe; and Monetary Policy and the Economy in South Africa (with Eliphas Ndou).

Ncube is currently a visiting professor at the University of Oxford.

== Work at the African Development Bank ==
Ncube was the Chief Economist and Vice President of the African Development Bank (AfDB). As Chief Economist, he oversaw the Economics Complex, which is focused on the process of knowledge management within the Bank and with its partners, and general strategic economic research within the Bank. In this regard, he supervised the Development Research Department, Statistics Department and African Development Institute. As a vice president, Professor Mthuli Ncube was a member of the senior management team of the Bank and contributed to its general strategic direction.

== Other work ==
Ncube was also a regulator and a board member of the South African Financial Services Board (FSB), which regulates non-bank financial institutions in South Africa, founding chairman of Barbican and Selwyn Capital and worked for Investec Asset Management as a Portfolio Manager and Head of Asset Allocation Strategy.

Ncube has also been chairman of the Board of the African Economic Research Consortium, chairman of the Global Agenda Council on "Poverty and Economic Development" (World Economic Forum) and a governor of the African Capacity Building Foundation.

== Finance Minister ==
Ncube was appointed Finance Minister of Zimbabwe on Friday 7 September 2018 under President Emmerson Mnangagwa's government. In 2019, he presided over the conversion from foreign currency to a new Zimbabwean currency, and the resultant return of hyper-inflation. Ncube suspended publishing inflation data after June 2019, and in October 2019 he indicated inflation figures for Zimbabwe would again be released in February 2020.

== Personal life ==
Ncube is married and has four children or more.
