= Samuel Mumbengegwi =

Zimbabwean politician

Doctor Samuel Creighton Mumbengegwi

Personal details
- Born: 23 October 1942
- Died: 14 June 2016 (aged 73)
- Party: ZANU-PF
- Occupation: Politician
- Profession: Lecturer, Educationist

Dr. Samuel Creighton Mumbengegwi (23 October 1942 – 14 June 2016) was a Zimbabwean politician who served for a time as Minister of Higher Education and as ZANU-PF Chairperson. He was the brother of the former Minister of Foreign Affairs, Dr. Simba Mumbengegwi.

== Political career ==
Mumbengegwi served for a time as Minister of Higher Education and as ZANU-PF Chairperson for Masvingo. According to the Commercial Farmers Union in 2002, he took over Irvin Farm from its white owners as part of land reform. He was subsequently appointed as Minister of Industry and International Trade in August 2002, and he was appointed as the Minister of State for Indigenisation and Empowerment in 2005. On 6 February 2007 he was moved to the position of Finance Minister, replacing Herbert Murerwa.

In the ZANU-PF primaries for the March 2008 parliamentary election, Mumbengegwi sought the party's nomination for the Chivi-Mwenezi Senate constituency in Masvingo Province, but he was defeated by Josiah Hungwe, a former Governor of Masvingo Province. Mumbengegwi disputed the result and the ZANU-PF national election directorate ordered the vote to be held over again, but Mumbengegwi was defeated for a second time, winning 4,906 votes against 8,736 votes for Hungwe, and therefore Hungwe received the ZANU-PF nomination.

The Herald reported on 3 January 2009 that Mumbengegwi had been dismissed from the Cabinet earlier in the week, along with 11 other ministers, because he no longer held any seat in Parliament.

He was put on the United States sanctions list in 2003 and remained on the list until his death.

== Death ==
He died on 14 June 2016 at Avenues Clinic in Harare due to an unknown ailment. At the time of his death, he was a lecturer at the Great Zimbabwe University in the Education faculty.

Political offices
| Preceded by Josiah Tungamirai | Minister of State for Indigenisation and Empowerment; 2005–2007 | Succeeded by Paul Mangwana |
| Preceded by Herbert Murerwa | Finance Minister; 2007–2008 | Succeeded by Tendai Biti |
