= Sikhanyiso Ndlovu =

Zimbabwean politician

Minister of Information and Publicity of Zimbabwe
- In office 6 February 2007 – December 2008
- President: Robert Mugabe

Personal details
- Born: 4 May 1937 Southern Rhodesia
- Died: 15 September 2015 (aged 78) Bulawayo
- Party: Zimbabwe African National Union-Patriotic Front

Sikhanyiso Ndlovu (4 May 1937 – 15 September 2015) was a Zimbabwean politician who was Minister of Information and Publicity from 2007 to 2008. He was also a member of the ZANU-PF Politburo.

== Political career ==
After serving as Deputy Minister of Education, Ndlovu was appointed as Minister of Information by President Robert Mugabe on 6 February 2007.

=== EU-Africa Summit ===
President Mugabe achieved a diplomatic coup in December 2007 when he attended a European Union-Africa summit despite a visa ban on Zimbabwean government officials, effective since 2001. At the summit, Ndlovu called Chancellor Angela Merkel a "Nazi remnant". Responding to Merkel's criticism of human rights abuses in Zimbabwe, Ndlovu told her to "shut up or ship out," saying Germany needed a head of state like Otto von Bismarck. By the time of the summit he was already placed on United States sanctions and European Union sanctions lists.

=== House of Assembly ===
Ndlovu was nominated as ZANU-PF's candidate for the House of Assembly seat from Pelandaba-Mpopoma constituency in Bulawayo in the March 2008 parliamentary election. He launched his campaign by slaughtering a beast and giving away bicycles to some of the people who attended his rally at Nkulumane Primary School, an act that his critics described as a gimmick to buy votes. Milford Gwetu, an MP for the Movement for Democratic Change who was running for re-election in the same constituency as Ndlovu, died during the campaign, and as a result the election there was delayed. In the postponed election held on 27 June 2008 he was defeated by MDC candidate Samuel Sandla Khumalo.

=== Cholera outbreak ===
On 12 December 2008, a day after Mugabe claimed that the Zimbabwean government had defeated a cholera epidemic, Ndlovu accused the United Kingdom of causing the outbreak in a "racist" attack meant to cause genocide against the Zimbabwean people.

== Dismissal ==
The Herald reported on 3 January 2009, that Ndlovu had been dismissed from the Cabinet earlier in the week, along with 11 other ministers, because he no longer held any seat in Parliament.

== Death ==
Ndlovu was admitted to the Intensive Care Unit (ICU) at Mater Dei Hospital in Bulawayo after he suffered a stroke. He had earlier suffered an Asthma attack. He died early in the morning on 15 September 2015. He was 78 years old.
