= Gwesela West =

Ward in Kwekwe District, Zimbabwe

Coordinates: 18.57805°S 29.43855°E

Gwesela West is ward number 9 of the 33 wards in Zibagwe Rural District Council of Kwekwe District, Zimbabwe . Its center is at Senkwasi Irrigation Scheme 14.5 km north east of Zhombe Joel ( Zhombe Joel is along the Kwekwe Gokwe Road) and 14.5 km south of Columbina Rural Service Center (Columbina-Empress is along the Kadoma-Gokwe Road).

Kwekwe is 55.5 km south-east and Kadoma 67 km north-east. (by air)

== Background ==
The ward gets its name from Chief Gwesela who is the traditional leader of this ward, parts of Empress Mine Ward and Zhombe Central Ward.

== Municipality ==
The Zibagwe Rural District Council runs the ward and at present the ward is represented by a female councillor, on a ZANU-PF ticket.

== Public Service ==
The center (Senkwasi Hall) is one of the 46 polling stations in this Zombe Constituency set by ZEC, the Zimbabwe Electoral Commission. The other polling stations in this ward are

- #14 Bhamala Primary School (there are 2 polling stations at Bhamala. The other one is a tent pitched opposite the school for Empress Mine Ward voters),
- #18 St Faith Primary School,
- #19 Sengezi Primary School and
- #21 St Pauls Primary School.

The current (2013–2018) Member of Parliament for Zombe Constituency Hon. Daniel Mackenzie Ncube comes from this ward.

== Business Centers ==
- St Faith (Manzamunyama) koMatatu
- Senkwasi St Pauls kwaGawu
- Senkwasi koNjaku

== Schools ==
Primary School

- St Faith Primary School (Manzimunyama) established in 1964
- Sengezi Primary School established in 1965
- St Pauls Primary School established in 1961

Secondary School

- St Faith Secondary School (Manzimunyama) established in 1982
- Sengezi Secondary School established in 2005 (?)

== Agricultural Services ==
- Senkwasi Irrigation Scheme, the smaller of the two irrigation schemes in Zhombe is situated here north of Senkwasi Dam.

The larger irrigation scheme is Ngondoma Irrigation Scheme 18 km north, in Mabura Ward.

== Health Center ==
Senkwasi Clinic, about 800 metres south west from Senkwasi Hall is staffed by 1 nurse, and has 8 general beds.

The clinic serves people from parts of wards 8 and 10 and almost the whole of Gwesela West.

Senkwasi (Sengwazi) clinic is the 1336th of the 1390 health centers in Zimbabwe and the 16th of the 46 in Kwekwe District according to 2004 statistics.

== Neighbouring Wards ==
- Mabura Ward 6 to the north.
- Empress Mine Ward 8 to the east and north east.
- Zhombe Central Ward 10 to the south and south west.
- Ward 12 to the west and south west.

This ward includes areas like Champeni, Fafi and Vulamachena.

== Animal Health Services ==
- Senkwasi Veterinary Station at Senkwasi Irrigation Scheme Compound.
- Bhuma-Bhamala Dip Tank near Bhamala Primary School.
- Sengezi Dip Tank near Sengezi Primary School
- Manzamunyama Dip Tank near St Faith Secondary School
