= Donjane =

Coordinates: 18.647375°S 29.494064°E

Donjane is ward 32 of the 33 wards in Zibagwe Rural District Council under Kwekwe District, Zimbabwe. It is in Zhombe-East in the Midlands.

== Background ==
Donjane Ward 32 was created out of Zhombe Central prior to the 2013 general elections. Its centre is a Mushangi Business Center.

It is represented by a male Zanu-PF councillor who is also the Zibagwe Rural District Council chairman.

The late Chief Samambwa II (George Ndumo) and the late Chief Samambwa III (Peter Mahundi) were both resident in Donjane Ward. Their father Chief Samambwa I (Matikidi Thomson Mapfumo Mandabwe) was resident in Mabura Ward in Samambwa village 600 metres east of Samambwa Primary School.

=== Name origins ===
It is common speculation that the name Donjane came from Don Juan, a mine near Donjane Clinic. Donjane is not a vernacular name but a name given by migrant or settler miners during the colonial era. Local villagers were not consulted when the occidental settlers gave place names, and there is no record of where the name came from. However, in the English Don Juan and Don Jane are two separate names. Locals here pronounce Donjane as Donjani, and it would not surprise if Donjani in Bosnia and Herzegovina is the namesake of the local Donjane (Donjani).

== Operations ==
=== Business centers ===
- Mushangi Township
- St Georges Township

=== Mining projects ===
There are several small scale mines around St Georges Township which include Don Juan Mine just 200 metres east of Donjane Clinic.

There are also several groups of gold panners in this ward most of them illegally operating. The government has however been planning to formalize work of gold panners by forming small miners' projects. Not much has been implemented however, because of the weak economy. Gold Miners Association (Zimbabwe) has designed plans to rescue small scale gold miners by facilitating association run gold mills. They have so far set two mills elsewhere in the country and they intend to establish the third here.

=== Schools ===
- Donjane Primary School 1965
- St Georges Primary School 1960
- Donjane Secondary School 1984

=== Health facilities ===
Donjane Clinic is 500 metres south of St Georges Primary School along the Sidakeni-Somalala Road. It serves Ward 32 and Bhamala Village in Ward 8 and Bhuma-Bhamhara Village in Ward 9. It is staffed by 2 qualified nurses and 3 nurse aides. It has 8 general beds.

=== Livestock facilities ===
Donjane Dip Tank is 500 metres south of Donjane Clinic, along the Power Line.

== Road network ==
All business centers in this ward are along the Somalala-Sidakeni Road which is popularly known as Zhombe East Road. The Somalala end joins the Kwekwe-Gokwe Highway at the 50 km peg from Kwekwe. The Sidakeni end joins the Kadoma-Gokwe-via-Empress Road about 1000 metres (east) before Sidakeni Township.

Mushangi Shopping Center is at the road's T-junction with the "Donjane-Tiger_Reef" road that passes through Mayoca to Kwekwe.

DDF (District Development Fund) base which does local roads is situated about 1000 metres southeast of Mushangi Shopping Center.

== Neighbouring wards ==
- Zhombe Central south and southwest ends.
- Gwesela West west end.
- Empress Mine north end.

== See also ==
- Zhombe Donjane ward
