= Columbina Rural Service Center =

Columbina RSC
- Township
- Nicknames: Columbina Township, Empress, Machipisa
- Location in Zimbabwe
- Coordinates: 18°26′48.72″S 29°26′41.10″E
- Country: Zimbabwe
- Province: Midlands
- District: Kwekwe
- Elevation: 1,023 m (3,356 ft)
- Time zone: UTC+2 (Central Africa Time)

Columbina Rural Service Center (RSC) is a township in Zhombe, Zimbabwe. It is 95 km northwest of Kwekwe and 67 km southwest of Kadoma.

The Center is near the now defunct Empress Nickel Mine which is about 4 km to the South-west. Blue Gum mine is on the Gokwe side of Ngondoma River yet this place was the original Blue Gum according to all maps before 1980. Blue Gum was right at the Samambwa Zhombe East Road turn-off here at Columbina RSC. Search engines always point to this place as Blue Gum, Zimbabwe. Columbina Rural Service Center is in Mahogo Village.

== Background ==
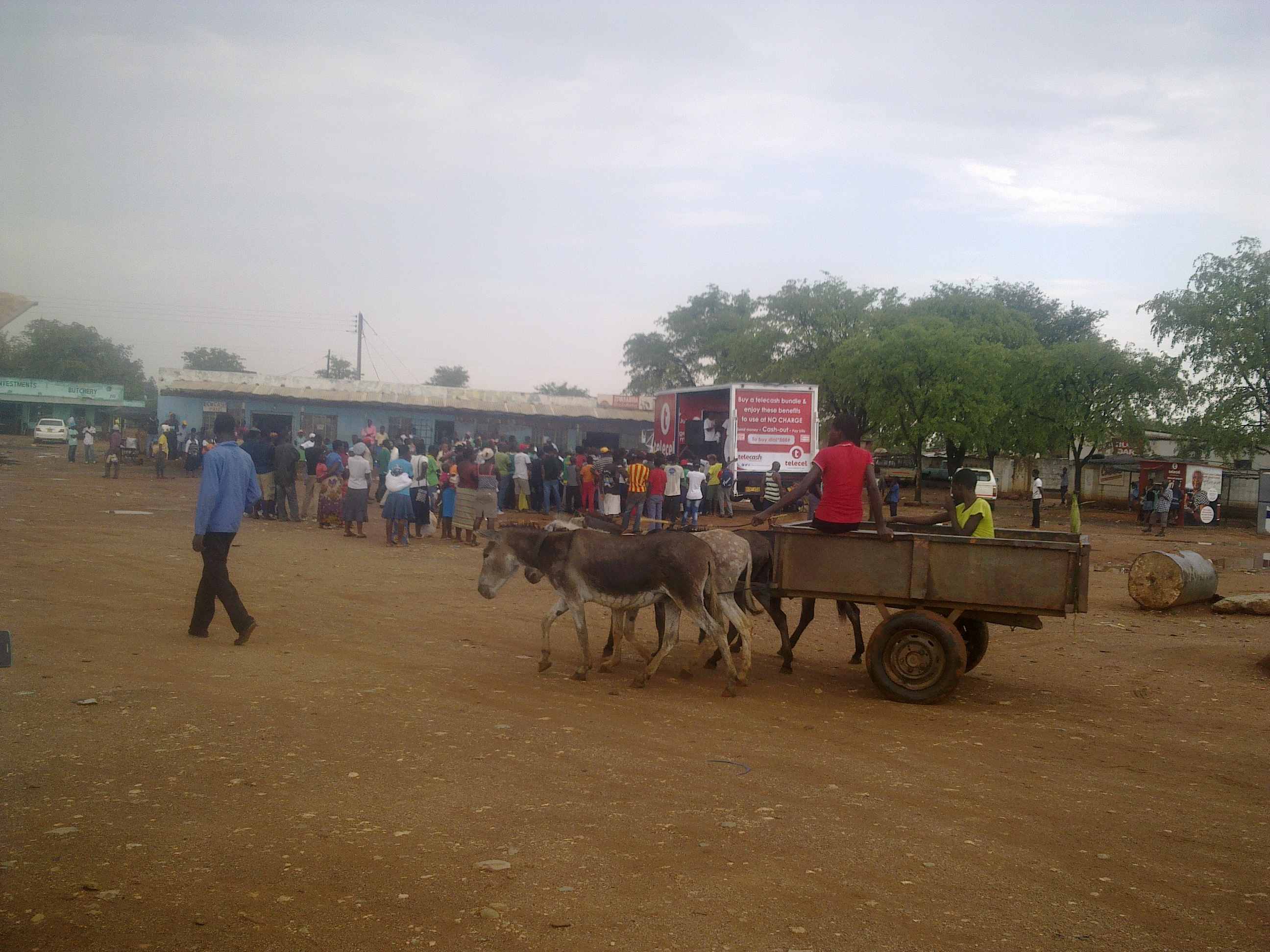
Columbina Rural Service Center, Zhombe

The center is in Mabura Ward of the Zibagwe Rural District Council in Mahogo Village, Chief Samambwa's area of jurisdiction.

People from outside Zhombe usually mistake Columbina RSC for Empress Mine Township because this is where commuters from different places debus on their way to Empress Mine Township.

After the closure of Empress Nickel Mine in 1985, Columbina then known as Machipisa Township became the main shopping center for the local people and for travellers to and from Kadoma and Gokwe Center. It was known as Machipisa Township because in the days of Empress the national famous Machipisa Brothers ran a very big shop here. Other stake holders way back then were Rumwe, Gwanzura, Mashingaidze, Mataruse, Mugadza, Chiwawu, Jabulani, Mundoza, Parehwa, Nakutepa and Majuzi.

== Service Center Status ==
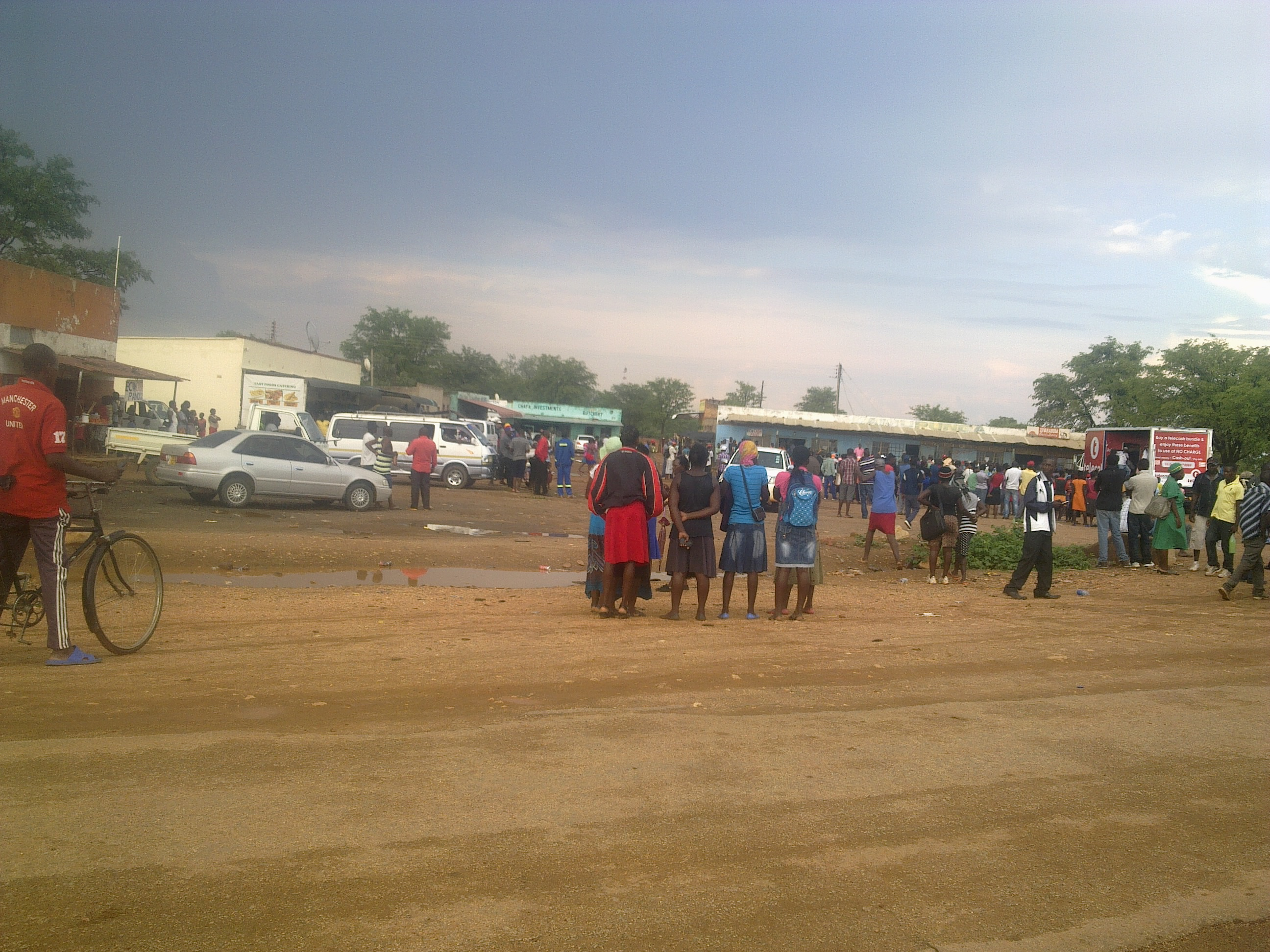
Columbina Machipisa Township

For years Columbina RSC ran second fiddle to Sidakeni Township, about 3 km east. Sidakeni was the main center in Zhombe East but Columbina RSC has since been upgraded to a Service center for its strategic lay out and popularity.

Zibagwe Rural District Council has approved a site map for huge developments at the center. The place has become the fastest developing center in all Zhombe.

== Education ==
Columbina Rural Service Center is surrounded by both primary and secondary schools a reasonable walking distance from the center.

Some children go to Nyaradzo High School and Mopani Primary School in Empress Mine Ward. Others go to Bee Mine Secondary School and Bee Mine Primary School here in Mabura Ward. Still others opt for Sidakeni Secondary School and Sidakeni Primary School in Sidakeni Ward.

== Health Facilities ==
Apart from two private surgeries at the center people go to Sidakeni Rural Health Center in Sidakeni and Rio Tinto College Clinic in Empress Mine.

== Nearby places ==
Commoner Houses is about 500 meters north. Just beyond it is May Jel Mine reclaiming the old dumps of Commoner Mine. Also to the north-west is Bushdale Gold Milling Company both employing quite a number of youths from the surrounding villages.

Empress Mine Township a former Empress Nickel Mine Residential area has turned into a Growth point, and has been ear-marked for Zimbabwe's newest town. Empress Nickel Mine closed in 1985 after 17 years in operation. Columbina (Colombina) Township has come to be known as Empress because of its proximity to Empress and because Empress Residents preferred shopping at Columbina than in-gates at Empress proper. Empress Mine was established in an area formerly known as Salakuhle (Salagushle), and Commoner School was initially Salakuhle School when it was established.

Sidakeni Business Center is about 3 km east of Columbina RSC. Sidakeni boasts of being the former and historical center of all activities in Zhombe-east. It is the home of COTCO which is a collection depot of the Cotton Company of Zimbabwe, formerly the Cotton Marketing Board. A Rural Health Center, Cattle Sale Pens and a primary and secondary schools are part of Sidakeni's pride in Zhombe.

The Ngondoma Irrigation Scheme is about 4 km to the North-west of Columbina RSC. The irrigation scheme supplies the locals with vegetables and other horticultural products. Ngondoma Irrigation Scheme was established in 1968 by the Government. It is 72 km by road from Kadoma. The initial area of the scheme was 10ha with 12 active farmers, but was extended to 50 ha in the early 1970s. Then in 1979 the area was reduced to 22.5 ha due to water shortages caused by the increasing demand of water at the then Empress Nickel Mine. Nowadays the scheme has over 100 farmers with quotas ranging between 0.1 and 0.6 ha and the hectarage has since been increased to +44 ha since the closure of Empress Mine. The Scheme is administered by AGRITEX, a Government extension for Agricultural Supervision and technical assistance. An additional 6ha of land has been put under irrigation about 2 km upstream as Ngondoma Irrigation Scheme extension. This came into effect because Empress Nickel Mine closed in 1985, and the water demand reduced reasonably. Water for the scheme comes from Ngondoma Dam on the Ngondoma River. The dam has an estimated capacity of 7.5 million cubic metres of water. The dam is under the Zimbabwe National Water Authority. Water from the dam is conveyed to the irrigation scheme by a free running carnal propelled by gradient because the irrigation is down-stream. The canal is 4.8 km long and delivers to an overnight storage dam inside the irrigation scheme. Unless Empress Nickel Mine reopens, which is very unlikely, the water supply to the irrigation scheme is adequate in all seasons.

The Ngondoma Irrigation Scheme is an affordable setup because the water supply does not need engines to transport it.

Mabura Caves is 25 km North of Empress Mine. It is a mine of bat guano used by farmers as fertilizer. The cave is also rated as a natural monument.

This ward got its name from Mabura Caves, "Mabura Ward", which is "Ward 6" in Zhombe.

BEE MINE Primary School is 6.5 km north.
