= Commoner, Zimbabwe =

Village and mining community in Zimbabwe

Coordinates: 18.482°S 29.422°E

Commoner, Zimbabwe is a populated place and a place where highly deformed and folded quartz reef structure gold ore is extracted. It is about 50 km west-southwest of Kadoma by air and 68 km by road. It is 67 km north-west of Kwekwe by air and 96 km by road. It is in Zhombe Kwekwe District, Midlands Province, Zimbabwe. Commoner is not to be confused with Commoner Gold Mine near Kadoma in Mashonaland West Province.

== Location ==
Commoner is in Mahogo Village, slightly over 1 000 metres north of Columbina Rural Service Center, in Mabura Ward of Zhombe Communal Land, Midlands Province, Zimbabwe.

== Residential area ==
Former Commoner Residential Compound has since been integrated into Mahogo Village but is still known as Commoner Houses following the closure of Commoner Mine in the early 1990s. Commoner Houses as the place is called is about 600 meters from Columbina Rural Service Center, making it the second closest location to the service center.

Commoner Houses benefited a handful of lucky local people when Commoner Mine closed, including Mahogo Village head. Some workers at the current mining plant at the old Commoner Mine site reside in these houses, either as their own homes or as tenants.

== Geology ==
Claims were first filed in 1890, and by 1982, the mine was developed to a vertical depth of 250 m. Gold production until 1947 amounted to 4009 kg. The Commoner orebody lies within the Commoner Formation, within the Bulawayan Group, 2.9-2.7 Ga. The Commoner Formation consists of andesitic tuffs, carbonaceous siltstones, and amygdaloidal andesitic lavas. The Commoner orebody is a tabular hydrothermal quartz-carbonate vein, averaging 1 m in thickness. Chalcopyrite, sphalerite, and galena are the common sulfide minerals associated with concentrations of gold. Later telluride mineralization includes native gold, Coloradoite and altaite.

Though Commoner is known to be rich in gold, and that the defunct Commoner Mine specialized in extracting gold ore, 17 other minerals of smaller deposits are known to be available at the mine at Commoner. These are altaite, arsenopyrite, chalcopyrite, coloradoite, galena, hematite, hessite, kostovite, melonite, petzite, pyrite, rickardite, sphalerite, stützite, sylvanite, tellurium and weissite.

== Commoner history ==
Commoner was named after Commoner Mine which was established during the Rhodesia era. The mine has been defunct for a decade but has since opened (2013) under a new name. Though the mine has another name, the name Commoner supersedes the later for it has become the name of a geographic place apart from the mine.

=== Mine ownership ===
A couple of organizations have owned the mine at Commoner in the past, including Africa Gold, but currently May Jel Mining Company is operating at Commoner reclaiming the old mine dumps.

== Community service ==
It is a requirement that an operating organisation should make profits and expand its own viability but still, it should benefit the local community in one way or the other.

=== Historical ===
- Salakuhle School (misspelt Salagushle) was changed to Commoner Primary School when the old Commoner Mine chipped in to help the upkeep of the school then. Commoner Primary School is located 6.8 km from Commoner Stadium by air, on the other side of Empress Mine in Zhombe Ward 8 in Sitsha Village, south-east of Ngondoma Dam.
- Commoner Hall has since been converted into a church for a local Pentecostal Assembly.
- Commoner Stadium is one of the ongoing service that the old Commoner Mine provided.
- Commoner Houses have been occupied by more than two scores of villagers under Mahogo Village.

=== May Jel Mining Company era ===
- May Jel Mine operating at Commoner has since drilled boreholes outside its yard and villagers in Maisa, Mahogo and Nzama villages fetch clean water from these water-points.
- Young people from these and other surrounding villages have found employment at the mine, easing the unemployment rate in the area, by a small but meaningful percentage.

== Commoner Stadium ==
Commoner is the center of Mahogo Village, and the main center for two other villages. (Latitude -18.4420 Longitude 29.4458)

- Mahogo Village community meetings are held at Commoner Stadium Commoner Grounds.
- The general elections polling station for Mahogo Village including Columbina Rural Service Center is set at Commoner.
- Local social soccer tournaments are played at Commoner Grounds.
- Independence celebrations and all other such public celebrations for Maisa, Nzama and Mahogo Villages including Columbina Rural Service Center and Ngondoma Irrigation Scheme are held at Commoner Grounds.

== Nearby places ==
- Columbina Rural Service Center about 1 km south
- Ngondoma Irrigation Scheme about 3 km north-west
- BEE MINE Primary School about 4 km north
- Sidakeni Rural Health Center about 3 km east
- Empress Mine Township
- Mopani Primary School
- Mabura Caves 19 km north
- Ngondoma Dam 4 km south-west
- Ngondoma River 3 km west
- Nyaradzo High School 5 km south-west-south
