= Zhombe =

Zhombe Jombe
- Communal land
- Location in Zimbabwe
- Coordinates: 18.667°S 29.349°E
- country: Zimbabwe
- Province: Midlands
- District: Kwekwe
- Time zone: UTC+2 (Central Africa Time)

Zhombe, originally known as Jombe, is a rural communal area in Kwekwe District, Midlands Province, Zimbabwe. It is an area of mixed Shona and Northern Ndebele People. It lies along the Mnyathi border line between Midlands and Mashonaland Provinces. There are a few commercial farms within its borders and a handful of resettlement areas. Most of it is within the Zhombe Constituency. Its administrative centre is the Zhombe Joel Growth Point, and it is under the Zibagwe Rural District Council.

There are fourteen business centres in Zhombe. Ten of the business centres are electrified. There are also two rural service centres: Empress and Zhombe Joel. As of 2011, there were 53 primary schools and 18 secondary schools. There are ten clinics (and one mission hospital) and several health centers in Zhombe.

The area is primarily rangeland supporting over 48,000 cattle, with 13 animal health centers and 26 dip tanks.

== Jombe ==
Zhombe is the current spelling of "Jombe", a former spelling which came about as a result of Portuguese orthography. It is not uncommon for "Jo" to continue to be pronounced "Zho" in these Central African names.

=== Geographic features named Jombe ===
There are both a hill and a river named Zhombe, sometimes spelled Jombe or Jombi. Coordinates: 18°32′2″S 29°3′37″E

The location of Zhombe Hill is just less than 3 kilometres (2 miles) east of Bhamala Township and the local people like to call it Zungunde the name of an infidel man who used to live up there. The geographic location of Zhombe Hill is in Mashonaland West Province because the provincial boundary is on the Zhombe side of Munyati River well off the banks, and at this place the boundary is about 700m west of the river bank. Local people like to think that the provincial boundary is right at the middle of the river but the truth on any map is that Munyati River is wholly in Mashonaland West Province almost throughout the eastern boundary of Zhombe and the Midlands Province.

=== Origins of Jombe ===
Jombe possibly originated from migrant workers who worked with the German gold miners, who had numerous small scale mines in Zhombe and elsewhere in Zimbabwe. They brought Jombe to this part of the world from elsewhere. Jombe is also the name of a type of deep purple chrysanthemum. "Jombe" is also a surname.

However, there must have been Jombe and Zhombe in the 1930s as Esme Newfield put down in her family biography, or there was a market place called Jombe and the other one Zhombe such as Jombe Store and Zhombe Store.

=== Jombe elsewhere ===
==== In Zimbabwe ====
Jombe is not a vernacular name, even as most names here are foreign and most names were imported from elsewhere.

There is Jombe Clinic in Jombe village, Mutasa District.

The French and the Portuguese would pronounce as Zho the Jo and it becomes Zhombe clinic.

There is also a mountain in Mashonaland East called Zhombwe, sometimes mispronounced as Zhombe.

So Zhombe was only the pronunciation of Jombe and someone at the native registrar's office misspelled it because of the pronunciation.

There is also not far from Zhombe a school called Zhombe SDA Primary School in Bombah, Gokwe. There are also Jombe Primary and Secondary Schools in Manicaland.

== Zhombe profile by ward ==
Wards 1 and 2 have since been scratched from Zhombe Constituency to Chirumanzu-Zivagwe Constituency, but still part of Zhombe Communal Lands. Ward 5 and 26 are now under Silobela Constituency but still in Zhombe Communal land. Zhombe Constituency has since been trimmed to 12 wards. but Zhombe Communal Land remains the same.

=== Ward 31 ===
This was Ward 1 of Zhombe Constituency. It is now Ward 31 under Chirumanzu-Zibagwe Constituency, but is still in Zhombe geographically.

Primary schools

- Bonwei, established 1984
- Munyati Zesa, established 1956
- Sherwood Park, established 1980

Secondary schools

- Munyati Zesa, established 1987

Health centers

- Sherwood Clinic has two nurses and two general beds.
- Munyati Clinic has four nurses and two general beds.

=== Ward 2 ===
Politically Ward 2 is now under Chirumanzu–Zibagwe Constituency but in Zhombe geographically.

Primary schools

- Chimwaoga, established 1982
- Sebakwe, established 1968

Health centers

- Sebakwe Clinic is staffed by one nurse and has two general beds.

=== Ward 5 ===
Politically Ward 5 is now under Silobela Constituency, but geographically is in Zhombe Communal Land.

This ward was where Sungura musician Tongai Dhewa Moyo grew up.

Primary schools

- Mariyangu Primary School, established 1999 - Maliyami
- Zivagwe Primary School, established 1985
- Kotamai Primary School

Secondary schools Njeremoto Secondary School

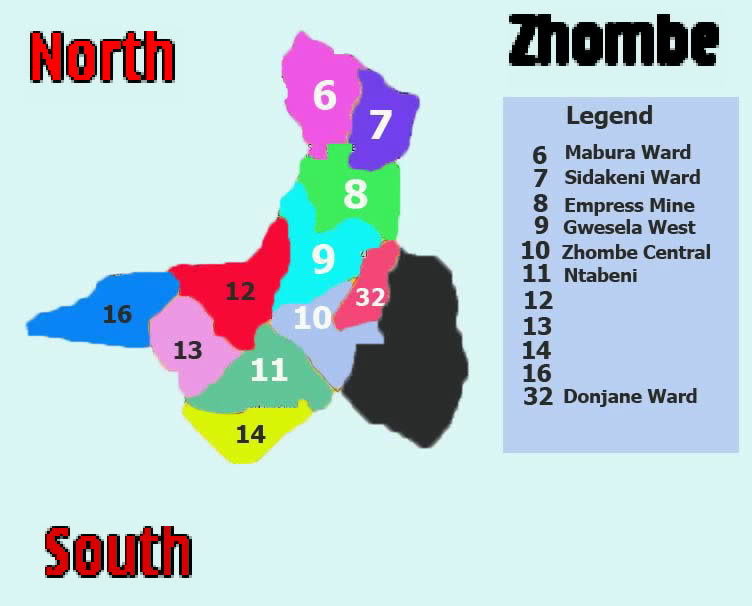
Zhombe Communal and Constituency

=== Mabura (Ward 6) ===
Business and service centers

- Columbina Rural Service Center

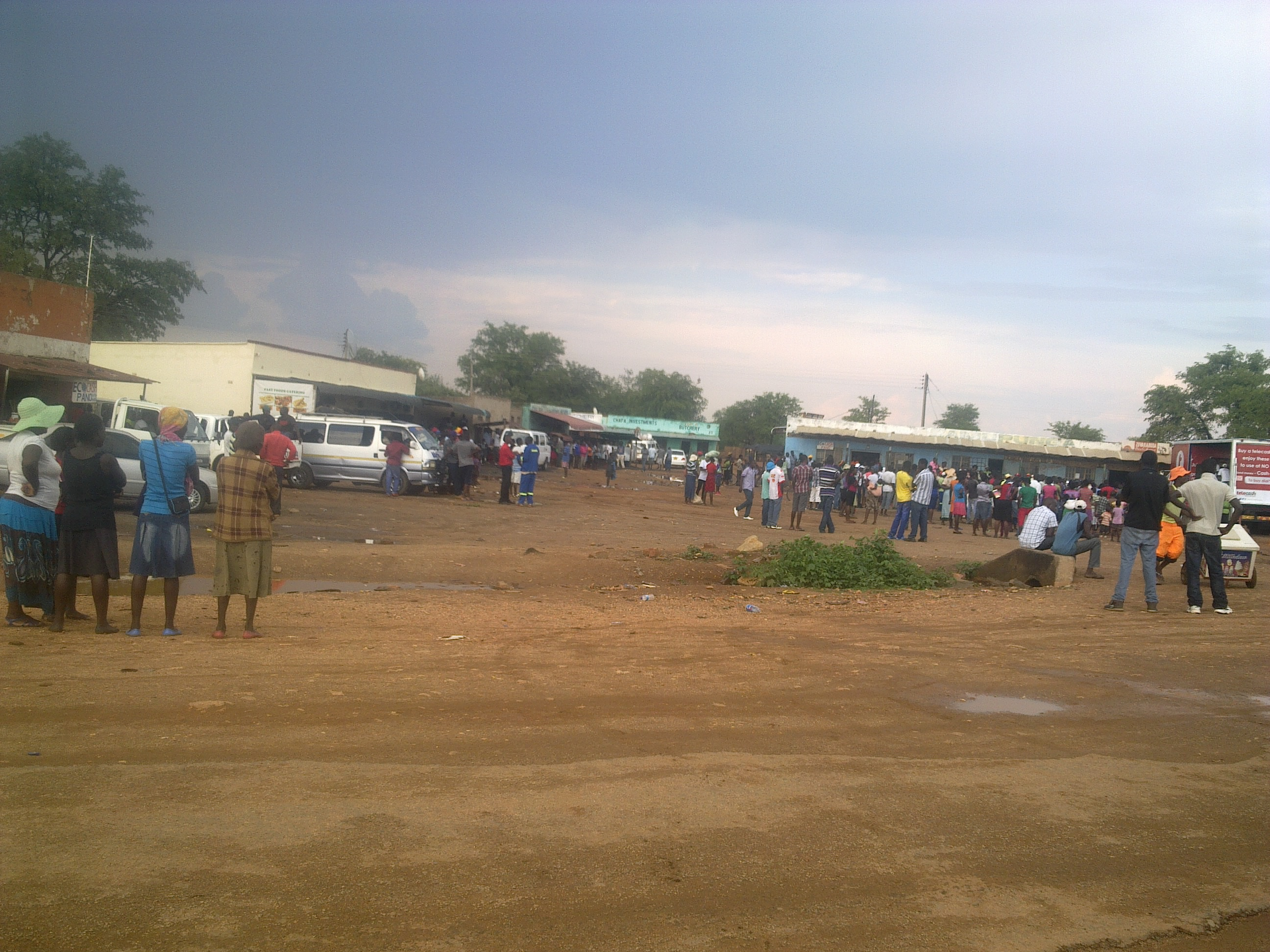
Columbina RSC Empress Township

Machipisa

- Bee Mine Township
- Samambwa Shopping Center
- Samambwa Villa was the rural home of one of Zimbabwe's young politicians, the late Learnmore Judah Jongwe.

Primary schools

- Bee Mine Primary School Established 1969
- Samambwa Primary School Established 1964
- Somapani Primary School Established 1966

Secondary schools

- Bee Mine Secondary School, established 1981
- Samambwa Secondary School, established 1984

Health centers

- Samambwa Clinic has one nurse, one helper, and eight beds.

Other facilities

- Commoner houses
- Ngondoma Irrigation Scheme
- Mabura Caves

=== Sidakeni (Ward 7) ===
Sidakeni is where the rural home of the Sungura songster Somandla Ndebele is. He started singing as a member of the Sidakeni Secondary School choir. That choir won first prize in the provincial choral competition, and from then Somandla pursued a career in Music.

Business and service centers

- Sidakeni Township

Coordinates:
Latitude 18° 26' 51"S | 18.4475 S
Longitude 29° 28' 39"E | 29.4775 E

Sidakeni used to be Zhombe East's mother center with Samambwa Council offices and the Samambwa Police Base at the center. For the fact that it is only 3 km east of Empress Sidakeni has lost its potential of becoming the talk of Zhombe East. However, one of the clinics that serves Empress is at Sidakeni, with the other being at Rio Tinto Agricultural College.

There are two school of the same name at this center, a primary one and a secondary one.

- St Peter's Munyati Township

This is the first township as one enters Midlands from Kadoma, which is in Mashonaland West. It is also the first township after Munyati River Bridge on the same route.

The township is also known as KwaHove after the pioneer businessman the late Mr Hove.

St Peter's Munyati is a primary school some 700 meters from the center.

This place has grown and now beats Sidakeni in business.

This place was the first rural home area of the chief Gospel music pioneer in Zimbabwe, Baba Mechanic Manyeruke in the mid-70s. He resided in Mubereki Village just behind Tagwirei Grindill Mill.Picky Kasamba, who used to help Olver Mutukudzi with backing vocals, also hails from this area, in the defunct mine compound of Vindo.

- Kasawi Township
- Mangwarangwara Township -KwaChiroro

Primary schools

- Kasawe Primary School, established 1965
- Mangwarangwara Primary School, established 1965
- Sidakeni Primary School, established 1966
- St Peters Munyati Primary School, established 1963

Secondary schools

- Sidakeni Secondary School, established 1981

Health centers

- Sidakeni Rural Health Center

Animal health centers

- Sidakeni Veterinary Clinic

Dip tanks

- Sundukazi

=== Empress Mine (Ward 8) ===
Empress Mine Ward, in which Empress Mine Growth Point is situated, got its name from the now defunct Empress Nickel Mine which operated at this location for nearly two decades. The mine came into operation in late 1968 and closed in 1985 (1982 to 1985).

For public convenience the Registrar General has set up the Empress Mine Sub Office at the Old Empress Mine Offices, next to the ZRP Samambwa Base, where people can register IDs, births and deaths.

Business and service centers

- Kamukuze Township, Navata
- Mavende Store, Mugqunyelwa Village
- Kaseke Shops, Empress Mine
- Navhata Shopping Center, KwaGweru
- Totororo Township

Totororo Township is one of the oldest townships in Zhombe east. Totororo had conventional telephones in the 1960s while most centers had not even seen a telephone. After the independence of Zimbabwe, Totororo produced a businessman who made sure the center was electrified from his own coffers. Unfortunately Mapolisa did not live long enough to see his efforts over-spill to other areas like Bhamala and St George.

Presently Totororo is second in business activities from Empress-Machipisa and statistically St George's comes third in all Zhombe East.

This is the village where author Morgan Mahanya lives.

- Bhamala Township

Bhamala or Bamala township used to be the biggest and most prominent township in all Zhombe East. The catchment area of Bhamala is not so big and business growth at this place is limited. One could get anything at this shopping center in past years, but for a much higher price, of course because only one omnibus serviced the route and it also served as a delivery vehicle for retail shops at the center. The place is surrounded by "Makorokoza" gold panners so the people there are not worried about spending.

Bhamala or Bamala is a headman and chief villager of this area. There are Bhamala Primary School and Bhamhara Secondary School at this center. There is also a very active and ongoing co-operative society called Karigamombe at the center. Karigamombe has been functional since the early 1980s. It is one of the few ongoing co-operative societies of the early eighties in all Zimbabwe.

Bhamala school relocated to this area from about 2 km south-east of where it stood in the sixties. Elderly locals know about this very well but only a handful of the younger generations have come about this piece of history.

The late Abet Dube, Headman Bamala's son-in-law, was head of the Old Bamala School.

The names Bamala and Bhamala both have the Indian-Pakistan origins since both are not for any Bantu clan. During colonial days the white bosses would give their servants whatever name they saw fit and eventually register them with the registrar general's office.

Primary schools

- Commoner Primary School, established 1954 as Salakuhle School, misspelled as Salagushle
- Mopani Primary School, established 1975
- Navata Primary School, established 1963
- Totororo Primary School, established 1964
- Bhamala Primary School, established 1964

Ward 8 and 9 wrestle for this school. However, in general elections the Gwesela West Ward polling station is always at the school, on side, while the Empress Mine Ward polling station is a tent pitched away from the school, on the off-side off the boundary road.

Secondary schools

- Bhamhara Secondary, established 1983
- Nyaradzo Secondary School, established 1981, formerly Mopani/Mbuya Nehanda.Young politician Learnmore Jongwe did his secondary education here before proceeding to Lower Gweru SDA Secondary for Lower and Upper Six.
- Totororo Secondary School, established 1986

Higher education There is Rio Tinto College of Agriculture at Empress Mine Township, Zimbabwe 3.5 km south of Columbina Rural Service Center. The college trains agricultural extension officers, but some students opt for other fields soon after completion of the three year Diploma in Agricultural Science and Practice. It is also known as RioZim Foundation Zhombe Agricultural College.

Health centers

- Rio Tinto College of Agriculture Clinic is staffed by one nurse, usually with the help of student nurses from Kwekwe General Hospital. It has two general beds.

Dip tanks

- Totororo

=== Gwesela West (Ward 9) ===
The current Member of Parliament for Zombe Constituency, Hon. Daniel Mackenzie Ncube, comes from Gwesela West.

Primary schools

- Manzamunyama St Faith Primary School, established 1964
- SENGEZI Primary School, established 1965
- Senkwasi St Paul's Primary School, established 1961

Secondary schools

- Manzimunyama St Faith Secondary School, established 1982

Health centers

- Senkwasi Clinic is staffed by one nurse, and has eight general beds.

Agriculture

Zhombe's second irrigation scheme, Senkwasi Irrigation Scheme, is in this ward, near Senkwasi Clinic and Senkwasi Dam.

=== Zhombe Central (Ward 10) ===
The eastern half of Zhombe Central is now Ward 32 Donjane.

Business and service centers

- Zhombe Joel, Zhombe Center

Joel is named after the famous businessman Joel Tessa. This is Zhombe Center.

Zhombe Joel is the current mother center of all Zhombe. Zhombe Police Station, Zhombe Grain Marketing Board Depot, Zhombe Cattle Sale Pens, Rio Tinto Zhombe High School, Zibabgwe Rural District Council Zhombe Offices, Zhombe Constituency Information Center, Zhombe Post Office and Chief Gwesela's Homestead are all at Zhombe Joel. It is also a favourite refreshment spot for motorists along the Kwekwe-Gokwe Highway.

St Andrew's best shops were the Nyaningwes that were owned by veteran businessman, Mr Choga, also known as "Skondai," in the 90s.

The center was formerly known as Mukolwane after one Zhombe east's historical headman Muzondeki Mukolwane.

St Andrew's is a nearby primary school.

Some like to call this place Majaqaba.

Primary schools

- Gwesela St Andrews Primary School, established 1963. The school produced the best 2013 girls' soccer team in the Midlands Region.

Secondary schools

- Somalala Secondary School, established 1984
- Rio Tinto Zhombe High School, established 1977, formally an F.2 secondary school

=== Donjane (Ward 32) ===
Donjane was created from the eastern part of Zhombe Central Ward prior to the 2013 general elections.

Business Centers

- Mushangi Business Center is the principal center in Ward 32.
- St Georges Township is the largest business center in Ward 32.

Schools

- Donjane Primary School, established 1965, formerly St Peter's School
- Donjuan St George Primary School, established 1962, relocated in the mid-1980s
- Donjane Secondary School, established 1984

Health centers

- Donjuan Clinic, Donjane Rural Health Center is staffed by two nurses and has eight general beds.

=== Ward 11 ===
Business and service centers

- Zhombe Mission, formerly KwaMashazhike
- Zororo
- Zhombe East Turnoff
- Zhombe Store

Primary schools

- St Martin de Porres Primary School, established 1964, Zhombe Mission School
- GOMOLA Primary School, established 1966
- Gwenzimukulu Primary School, established 1963
- SOMALALA Primary School, established 1930

Secondary schools

- Gwenzunkulu Secondary School, established 1993

Health centers

- Gomola Rural Health Centre is staffed by one nurse and has eight general beds.

=== Ward 12 ===
Primary schools

- Champeni Primary School, established 1981
- FAFI Primary School, established 1954
- Vulamatsheni Primary School, established 1980, Mvuramachena

Secondary schools

- Fafi Secondary School

Health centers

- Malisa Zhombe Clinic is staffed by one nurse and has eight general beds.

=== Ward 13 ===
Primary schools

- MAVHULE Primary School, established 1963, Mavule
- Mugandani Primary School, established 1982
- Sikabela Primary School, established 1981
- ST JUDE'S Mhazhe Primary School, established 1960

Secondary schools

- Mhazhe St Judes Secondary School, established 1982

=== Ward 14 ===
Primary schools

- Nduku Primary School, established 1946, St Theresa
- Ntabeni Primary School, established 1964

Secondary schools

- Nduku Secondary School, established 1981, St Theresa

Health centers

- Ntabeni Clinic is staffed by one nurse and has eight general beds.

=== Ward 15 ===
This ward is now under Silobela Constituency. However it is still in Zhombe Communal Land. Ward 19 of Silobela Ward where Exchange Irrigation Scheme is situated is in Zhombe Communal Land also, yet in Silobela Constituency. See the old map of QueQue District (Kwekwe District).

Primary schools

- Batanayi Sessombe Primary School, established 1982
- Mutimutema Primary School, established 1993
- Rusununguko Primary School, established 1987
- Somoza Primary School, established 1983
- Sunganayi Primary School, established 1985

All schools in this ward were established after the independence of Zimbabwe.

Health centers

- Nyoni Rural Health Centre is staffed by two nurses and has eight general beds.

=== Ward 16 ===
Primary schools

- Mangwizi Primary School, established 1981
- Nhengure Primary School, established 1963
- Nkiwane Santa Maria Primary School, established 1962
- Tombankala Primary School, established 1999

Secondary schools

- Tombankala Secondary School, established 1986

Health centers

- Dendera RuralHealth Center is staffed by two nurses and has eight general beds

=== Ward 17 ===
Politically Ward 17 is now under Silobela Constituency, but geographically is in Zhombe Communal Land.

This and two other wards benefitted from a piped water project by ZIMWA, facilitated by Plan International. For many years water was a problem in this area. For years villagers in Dendera in Zhombe and their livestock walked long distances of about 15 kilometres to the nearest water source. The problem has, however, come to an end after ZINWA with help from Plan International successfully completed a piped water project.

Primary schools

- DENDERA Primary School, established 1968
- Mabhidhli Primary School, established 1981
- Mawolokohlo Primary School, established 1982
- Mkobogwe Primary School, established 1981
- Tshapewa Primary School, established 1945

Secondary schools

- Dendera Secondary School, established 1986

=== Ward 26 ===
Politically. Ward 26 is now under Silobela Constituency, but geographically in Zhombe Communal Land.

Primary schools

- Muchape Primary School, established 1986
- Batanai Zisco Primary School, established 1985

Secondary schools

- Mutimutema Secondary School, established 1987

== Major rivers ==
Munyati River is visually the boundary between Mashonaland West Province and Midlands Province though on the map the river is wholly in Mashonaland. The following are major tributaries of the Munyati River as in Zhombe.

=== Ngondoma River ===
Ngondoma River is the main boundary between Gokwe South District and Zhombe Communal Land. It has two bridges, one on the Kwekwe-Gokwe Highway and the other on Gokwe-Empress Road.

It is dammed with Ngondoma Dam which supplies Empress Mine, Columbina Township and Ngondoma Irrigation Scheme with water.

=== Zhombe River ===
Zhombe River is one of the three main rivers in Zhombe Communal Land that are tributaries to Munyati River. The other two are the Sesombe River (Zvuuzvumbe River) to south and Ngondoma River to the north.

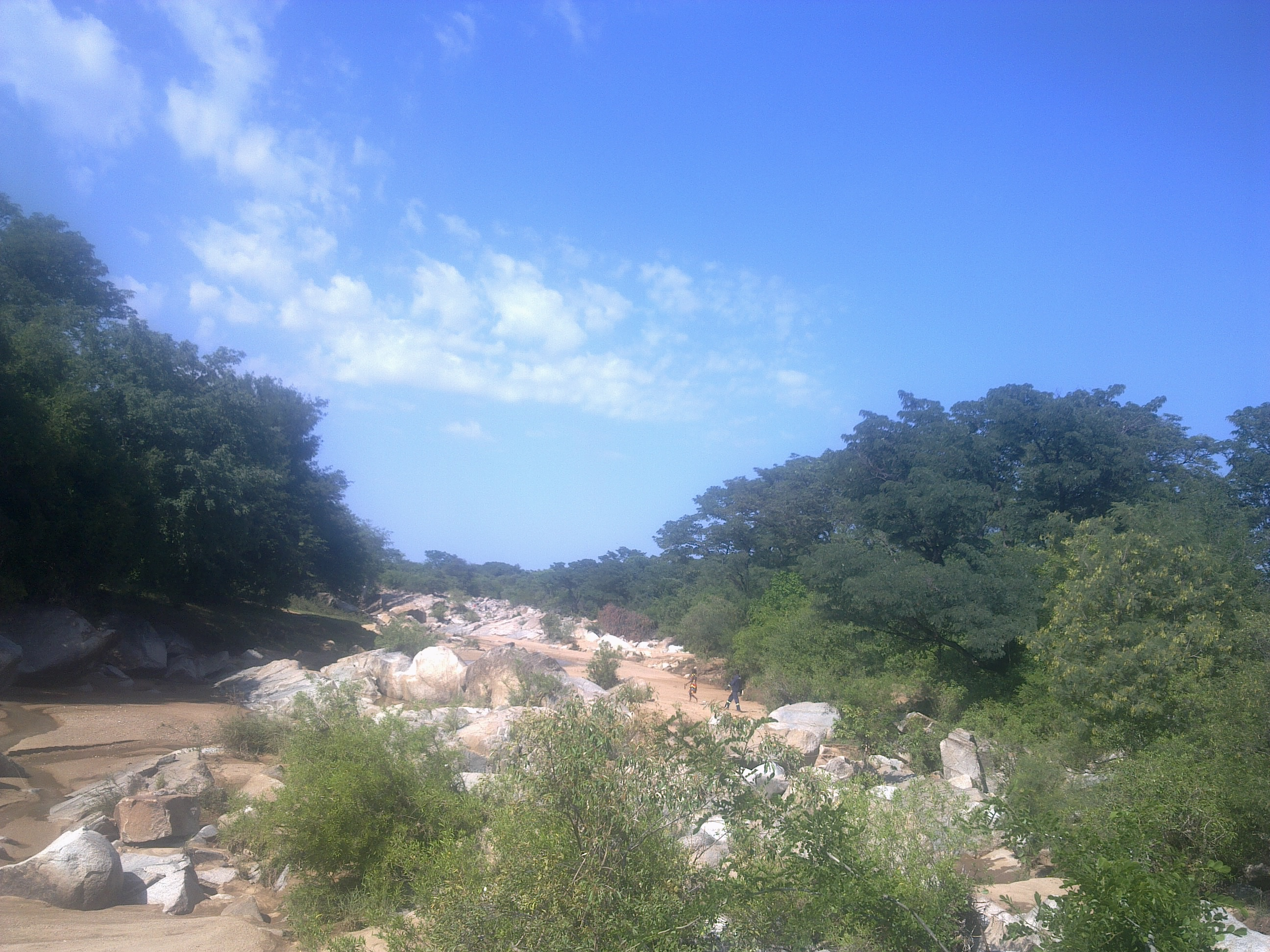
Zhombe River, rocky section near Zhombe River Bridge

Its source is in Chief Ntabeni's area in the south-west region of Zhombe, the western foot of a kopje in Jamela village which has a spot height of 1236 metres. Sedombe River starts also at the southern heel of the same kopje.

It has two main bridges across it: one on the Kwekwe-Gokwe Highway (R847 Road) and the newer one on the Somalala-Sidakeni Road south of Bhamala School.

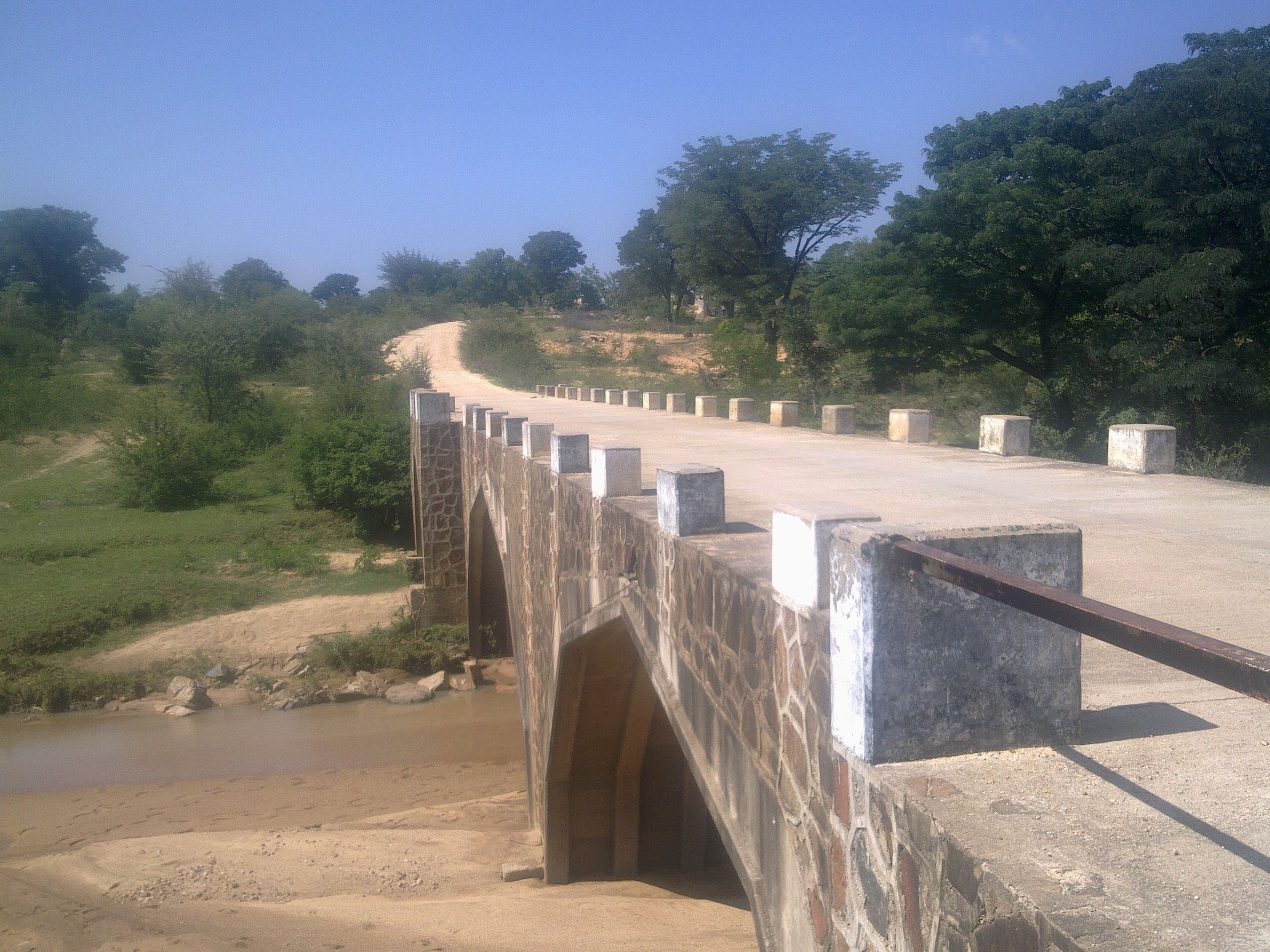
Zhombe River bridge in Zhombe east

Its tributaries are:

- Senkwasi River which impounds into Senkwasi Dam upstream that supplies Senkwasi Irrigation Scheme
- Manzamunyama River after which Manzamunyama School is nama
- Ngwenzi River which is dammed upstream by Gwenzi dam which supplies water to Zhombe Mission and Zhombe Joel
- Somkaya River dammed with Somkaya Dam

The river flows generally north-east and it passes west of Semhakasa Kopje whose spot height is 1146 metres. About 500 metres before it enters Munyati River the river turns just less than a right angle east towards on-coming current of the Munyati River. This is caused by the southern end of Zhombe Hill which stretches from here northwards.

When the major river is flooded the current of Zhombe River slows down causing the water depths to be so deep for 2 to 3 km towards Zhombe River mouth.

Villagers here do not temper with this section of Zhombe River when Munyati River is flooded.

The river itself has no dam.

=== Sesombe River ===
Sesombe River (Zvuuzvumbe River) has its source south of Jamela Kopje in Zhombe south-west, in Chief Ntabeni's area. It flows generally north-east torwards Munyati River.

It passes the Kwekwe-Gokwe Highway south of Rusununguko School and north of Jombe. Further downstream Sesombe River passes west of Rugugwe Kopje whose spot height is 1117 metres.

Its tributaries are:

- Somalala River. This and Ngazimbi River impound into Somalala Dam. There was an experimental irrigation near Somalala Dan in the early 1990s which failed outright. Somalala River has another dam east of Donjane Primary School which the school uses for garden projects.
- Mandombe River
- Chimwamombe River
- Maliyami River is the only major tributary from the eastern side of Sesombe River. It is dammed with Mayorca Dam and there is a small irrigation scheme near the dam.

Sesombe has another bridge on the Donjane-Kwekwe via Mayorca Road.

It enters Munyati River about 3 km upstream from Zhombe River mouth.

=== Other ===
- Mangwararangwara River that is bridged east of Sidakeni Primary School on the Gokwe-Empress is not a very big river but popular in Zhombe east.
- Totororo River which Totororo Secondary School was named after is not a big river but has a lot of legends and local history upon it.

== Summary ==
=== Traditional leaders ===
There are four chiefs in Zhombe: two in Zhombe-east and two in Zhombe-west.

- Chief Gwesela, Zhombe-east
- Chief Samambwa, Zhombe-east
- Chief Malisa, Zhombe-west
- Chief Ntabeni, Zhombe-west

The most popular headmen in all Zhombe are Nduku in Zhombe-west and S Samambwa in Zhombe-east. The two are usually mistaken for chiefs.

=== Historical events ===
Zhombe is known to have been the home of one of the most wanted men in the mid-1980s, the dissident leader, Richard Gwesela.

The late Chief Gwesela, however, thought Richard was not one of them let alone his surname.

Zhombe, particularly Zhombwe East, is where the late Chief Samambwa used to reside. He died in 2009. His jurisdiction extends as far as Empress, Sidakeni and Mangwarangwara. Zhombe East is rich in gold, which has saved the lives of the majority of Zhombe residents who had resorted to gold panning for the past five years of drought.

Installation of the new chief has not yet been officially made but the eldest son of the late chief Willard Sonny Samambwa is currently chief in an acting capacity. Any changes will be published in the Government publication List of Traditional Leaders in Zimbabwe. In 2018 Samuel Samambwa was placed as Chief soon after the November 2017 resignation of R.G Mugabe. He is the current Chief Samambwa

=== Main village centers in Zhombe East ===
- KUdamu(dam)
- Somalala
- Donjane
- Bhamala
- Totororo
- Sidakeni
- Kasawe
- Bee Mine
- Mangwarangwara
- Samambwa
- Somapani

=== Food security ===
Food crops that are popularly grown in Zhombe include maize, groundnuts, roundnuts, sorghum, millet and cotton. The two irrigation schemes in Zhombe east also farm beans and okra seasonally.

=== Water reticulation ===
The constituency has a total of 352 boreholes and 72 deep wells from which residents draw water. Of that figure, 257 boreholes and 57 deep wells were functioning as of 2011.

=== Developments ===
Empress Mine Township has since been ear-marked for the newest town in Zimbabwe, and developments are already taking place, although slowly. A new mine venture has sprung up at the Old Commoner mine dumps, and is doing very well, employing over a hundred people from the surrounding villages.

Totororo, a township between Empress and Bhamala is growing fast due to the opening of a new mine in the vicinity.

There are also three Cotton Marketing Board depots in the constituency.

There are three irrigation schemes at Senkwasi, Ngondoma 1 and Ngondoma 2 respectively. The two schemes are supplied by Ngondoma Dam via gradient carnal water system; no electricity or any fuel used to pump water along the +3 km carnal route.

=== Social ===
In Donjane area during the early 1990s, the entertainment industry emerged through the likes of one of the Kerere sons who used to sing the song"Kufamba kwake Miriyemu kunobuda mapepa" which was often played in "Ndari" (i.e. in households where local home brewed beer was sold).

=== Politics ===
The political atmosphere has substantially changed in Zhombe East. This area has been known for years for being politically stable and violence free, and since the days of the Government of National Unity (GNU), Zhombe residents have witnessed free expression of political views. The elders have urged the youngsters not to be used by politicians, to murder, torture and harass people for the politicians' political self-interest. The peace-loving people of Zhombe detest political violence and people who come to inflict violent mentality in the minds of Zhombe people have been greatly criticized by Zhombe residents.

== History ==
=== Former council offices ===
In the days when Zimbabwe was Rhodesia the local government ministry established local council offices in chieftains.

==== Gwesela Council ====
There were council offices across Gwenzi River, directly opposite Zhombe Mission, on the other side of Gwenzi Dam. These were the Gwesela Council offices and a council run beer-hall called Important. Makuva Store was the store of the days then at this township.

==== Samambwa Council ====
Samambwa Council office and beer-hall were at Sidakeni Township. The beer-hall at Sidakeni is still there though not so active in recent years.

=== F.2 secondary schools ===
The present day Rio Tinto Zhombe High School was formally an F.2 school. F.2 school students would complete Form Four (Ordinary level) after five years of secondary education with practice on subjects like building, metal work, dress-making and the like. F.2s sat for N.C.E (National Certificate of Education) examinations (at J.C., Junior Certificate), unlike their counterparts the F.1s who sat for GCE Junior then Senior Certificate (Cambridge University) exams.

There was no formal secondary school in Zhombe before independence, let alone this F2 school built by Rio Tinto in the mid-1970s. The nearest mission secondary school was Loreto in Silobela.

=== Kasisi Lower Primary School ===
There was a primary school at Kasisi Village, between Bhamala and St Peters Munyati School. It was a lower primary school called Kasisi. The school was closed because not many pupils were in its location, and the road network and terrain are poor even up to today.

=== Old loop roads ===
There was a bus road that linked Zhombe-Joel with Donjane. The road branched off the Zhombe Joel-Sidakeni road at Xaba Shops just north of where the Tel-One booster is now, and it went all the way through Manzimunyama to Mutohwe in Donjane near St Mukasa’s Roman Catholic Church. It was serviced by a United Bus Service bus six days a week, making one non-returning trip per day. Another road also branched from the Zhombe Joel-Sidakeni road at Sengezi Cross and went east to join the Bhamala-Totororo road. Actually the original road was the Bhamala-Sengezi one, and the one from Totororo was secondary. This explains why the road from Totororo to Bhamala seem to have been misplaced; it runs from the direction of either center into no-man's land only to make a sharp turn much later, to the right direction. At that sharp turn, the road to Sengezi Cross branched.

=== The two chiefs' school days ===
St Andrew's (Gwesela) School used to be the best upper primary school in Zhombe East. It had Sub A and Sub B (sub-standard), then Standard 1 to Standard 6. This meant one had to complete primary school in eight years. The late Chief Nobody Gwesela and the current acting Chief Willard Samambwa did primary school at St Andrews in the same years when the head teacher was Nyakura Sibanda. St Andrew's was then strictly an Anglican school, with Father Sototombe being the responsible priest. Father Sototombe, however, came for mass once a week from town.

=== The first mission school ===
St Martin de Porres School, Zhombe Mission was also a notable school in those days. In the greater part of the sixties and seventies C E Mapfumo was Headmaster with Mr Tsikira of Zhombe East deputizing. Lower primary schools' final exams were held at Zhombe Mission. All grade 5 or Std. 3 exams were held at one place for all schools that were not upper primary. Upper primary schools were those that had Std. 6 and later grade 7, and lower primary were those schools that had up to grade 5 only.

This explains why Chief Willard Samambwa and the late Chief Nobody Gwesela ended up at St Andrew's School. Chief Chakaipa Gwesela, the father of Nobody Gwesela, resided near Semakazi Kpje then, before he shifted to Zhombe Joel. Chief Chakaipa Gwesela under-studied Sub-chief Muzondeki Mukolwane who resided near where Majaqaba Shops (St Andrew's) are situated now.

=== Zhombe Store ===
Zhombe Store, near Zhombe Bridge (Old Somalala-Zhombe Mission dust road) was the best shop in the area. Fountain pens, nibs, pen-holders and ink were always available there. In the sixties schools did not use today's pens but fountain pens or pen-holders fitted with a nib for dipping in ink for writing. Buses and delivery vans passed right at the front of Zhombe Store, so supplies were never short at this store. United Bus Service (now ZUPCO) and Kambasha Bus Service were the only buses that serviced the Que-Que (Kwekwe)-Gokwe road.

=== First Black school inspector ===
Today's Sabhuku Kadzunge (Village Head) was a school inspector well before independence. He was a high-ranking official in the education sector, the equivalent of today's education officer.

== See also ==
- Columbina Rural Service Center
- Zhombe Shona version
