= Totororo Secondary School =

Coordinates: 18.48349°S 29.48364°E

- Zhombe-East, Midlands; Zimbabwe

Information
- Type: Day school
- Established: 1986
- Authority: Zibagwe RDC
- Gender: co-educational
- Classes offered: Form 1 to 4
- Nickname: Totololo

Totororo Secondary School is a school in Empress Mine Ward of Kwekwe District in the Midlands Province of Zimbabwe.

== Name Origins ==
Totororo is a Shona dialect for the Ndebele name Totololo. Some of the earliest settlers here in the early twentieth century were the Mathe-Mbalekelwa family who came from Silobela in search for greener pastures for their cattle. These people still keep large herds of cattle. They settled near Munyati River and they named this tributary Totololo after the Totololo Stream back in Silobela. The stream and dam called Totololo in Silobela area is 64 km southwest of Totororo Primary School. Totololo Dam is on coordinates -19.03331°, 29.28333°. Legend says the Silobela Totololo was named after Totololo Stream (also known as Klein-Buffels) in KwaZulu Natal in South Africa where the Mbalekelwa family originated. (There is a school named after the Mbalekelwa back in KwaZulu Natal. Klein-Buffels refers to a stream of petty pastures or patchy pastures. Buffel grass is usually the chief of pastures growing to taller than half a metre but here the grass seem to have a deficiency of some kind. 'Klein' is a German word meaning short, little, insignificant or petty, and 'Buffel'(s) is a type of grass used in South Africa for pasture and forage. The combination of 'klein' and 'buffels'; Klein-Buffels means that the stream has 'petty pastures' or small stature pastures which cattle breeders cannot rely upon. (Klein-Buffels may also refer to Short-Buffaloes but there are no such Buffaloes. Buffel is Afrikaans for Buffalo) Totololo is a Zulu slang for 'patchy pastures' and so Totololo Stream in Silobela has patchy Bufflo grass. When the Mathe-Mbalekelwa people settled in Zhombe East along the Munyati River they named this tributary Totololo because of the kind of pastures that grow along it. Totololo is a Ndebele word. In ChiShona language vocabulary there is no letter 'L', so the Shona people who are presently the majority in this area pronounce Totololo as Totororo, hence Totororo Stream, Totororo village and Totororo School. The Ndebele still pronounce the school name as 'Totololo' school because there is no 'r' in their vocabulary.

== Location ==
The school is located along the gravel road Somalala-Sidakeni Road, a link road to the Kwekwe-Gokwe Highway. It is 64 km NWN of Kwekwe and 48 km SW of Kadoma by air.

== Background ==
Totororo Secondary School was established in 1986.

== Operations ==
The school offers secondary co-educational services from Form 1 to 4 over four years.

Pupils start school at least in their 13th year of age and graduate from this school in their 18th year at most. The school offers Literature in English, Mathematics, Integrated Sciences, English Language, Religious Studies, History, Geography, Commerce, Shona Language and Agriculture subjects.

Its main source of enrollment is Totororo Primary School which is just 100 metres east.

=== Totororo Primary School ===
The primary school was established in 1964. The school offers primary co-educational services from Grade 1 to 7 over seven years. Pupils start school at least in their 6th year of age and graduate from this school in their 13th year at most. Apart from English, Mathematics, a vernacular language and General Paper, the school offers other non-examinable subjects such as Art and Craft, House Economics, Music, Sports and Physical Education.

=== Special Programs ===
Totororo Primary School was one of the 16 Kwekwe District primary schools that participated in "Our Nation" a programme arranged and sponsored by "Junior Achievements Zimbabwe", the organization that helps young

people in and out of school to develop skills in business and entrepreneurship to create a better understanding of their lives and communities in which they are part. The programme examines how businesses operate in various economic challenges. Grades 6 and 7 participated in the program.

== ChiShona ==
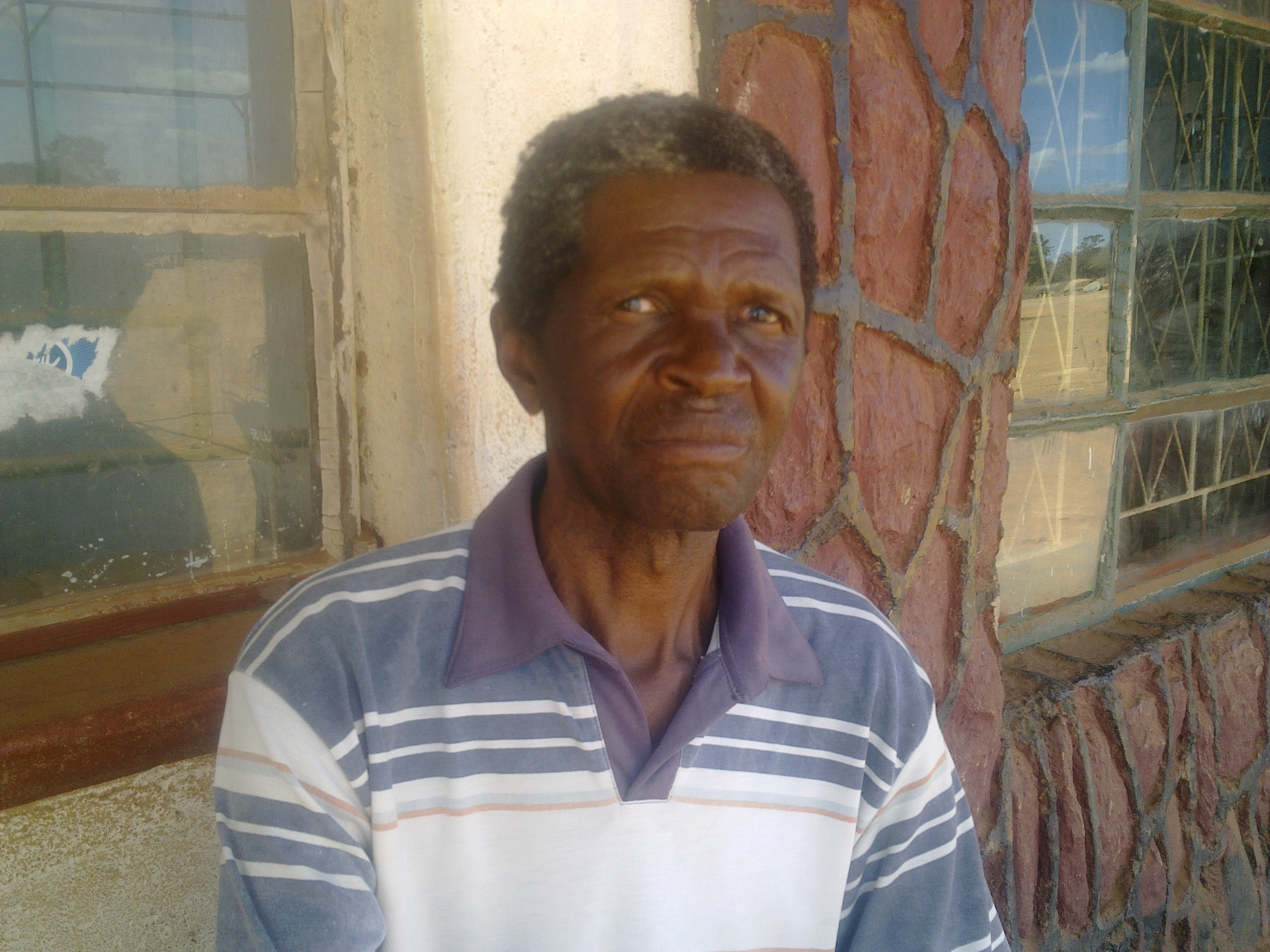
Morgan Mahanya, Zimbabwean writer

Shona language is the favorite here because of the inspiration by one of Zimbabwe's leading Shona-novelists, Morgan Mahanya who lives only about a kilometre northwest of the school.

== See also ==
- List of schools in Zimbabwe
- Zhombe Empress Mine Ward Schools
