= Crocodile Sounds =

Zimbabwean military band

Crocodile Sounds is a military band of the Zimbabwe National Army‚ stationed at Inkomo Barracks in Harare, the national capital, where it serves as part of the Mechanised Brigade. It was originally formed in 1983 as Vijana Sounds and reformed in 2015 as Mbada Sounds. It is composed of civilians and military personnel who function as a small ensemble. As a result, it does not take part in major parades like its counterpart the Zim Army Band.

== History ==
The ensemble was originally founded in 1983 by soldiers of the Infantry Battalion, stationed at Silobela at the time, with bandleader Corporal Retisi Kaibosi, and was called Vijana Sounds. After a decline in numbers, due in part to many of its members being assigned in 1998 to peace-keeping duties in the Democratic Republic of Congo, the band ceased performances. However, in 2015 under Captain Mathias Ngomayezwe it was reconstituted within the 5th Infantry Brigade, and given the new name of Mbada Sounds, because the leopard (mbada) was the symbol of that brigade.

In 2018, the band was transferred to the Mechanised Brigade and the name was changed to Crocodile Sounds to reflect the symbol of its new unit. Some were concerned that this change was made in support of the election campaign of President Emmerson Mnangagwa, who was himself referred to as "The Crocodile". Despite the similarities in the band name and Mnangagwa's nickname, the government said that was no link between the president and the band, with officials explaining the name with the fact that the brigade's mascot is a crocodile. In May 2018, the band then launched and promoted its first music album entitled Garwe Rauya (a Shona phrase meaning "The hero has arrived"). The nine-track album was launched at a ceremony at Old Hararians Sports Club in Harare.
