= Senkwasi Irrigation Scheme =

Irrigation scheme in Zimbabwe

Coordinates: 18.57777°S 29.43913°E

Senkwasi Irrigation Scheme is a cultivated area in Gwesela West 55.5 km (by air) northwest of Kwekwe in Chief Gwesela's area of jurisdiction. It is 14.6 km northeast of Zhombe Joel.

== Background ==
Senkwasi is sometimes called Sengwazi, Sengwasi or Senkwazi. The place was named after Senkwasi River which is the main contributor into the Senkwasi Dam. Senkwasi Dam is just 300 metres south on coordinates -18.57925° and 29.44065°

Senkwasi is one of the 2 working irrigation schemes in Zhombe. The larger of the two is Ngondoma Irrigation Scheme near Empress Mine. However, in the original Zhombe Communal Land (not Zhombe Constituency) there are two more irrigation schemes; Mayoka Irrigation Scheme in Ward 5 and Exchange Irrigation Scheme in Silobela Constituency.

Senkwasi Scheme is also one of the 17 irrigation schemes in the Midlands Province.

== Operations ==
It has 40 plot holders.

The fields are watered by canal water ferried by an electric-engine pump from Senkwasi Dam. There are also several hand-driven boreholes along the west end of the scheme.

The irrigation scheme has become not so viable of late because of the regular load shedding by the national electric power authority, ZESA.

=== Irrigation system ===
Farmers here use surface irrigation in which they siphon water from the lateral canal and flood the furrows that run between crop rows. All the fields are subdivided such that farmers could use furrows, borderstrips or basins depending on water pressure. When the electric engine is down farmers use the various hand-driven boreholes to water portions of their lots manually. In times like these they adopt localized irrigation where water is distributed under low pressure through pipes of various lengths and size.

== Nearby places ==
- Empress Mine

13.5 km north. Bearing 1°.

- Navhata Primary School (Nevada)

7 km North Bearing 6°.

- ST FAITH Primary School

3.7 km South SW Bearing 207°

- ST PAULS Primary School

5.5 km East

Bearing 82°
