= Exchange Irrigation Scheme =

Project in Midlands Province, Zimbabwe

Coordinates: 18.800917°S 29.029886°E

Exchange Irrigation Scheme is a 165 hectares (410 acres) irrigated arable land in Zhombe Communal Land but in Silobela constituency in Kwekwe District of the Midlands Province of Zimbabwe. It is 37 km (23 mi) southwest of Zhombe Joel, 83 km (52 mi) northwest of Kwekwe and 25 km (16 mi) north of Crossroads DSC.

It is in region 3; the climatic conditions are semi-arid with an average yearly rainfall of 632 mm (24.9 in). Estimated elevation is 1,200 metres (3,900 ft) above sea level.

== Background ==
Exchange Irrigation Scheme developed in two phases. The first phase in 1973 developed 56 hectares (140 acres) to supplement to farmers who had been resettled on 2.5 ha (6.2 acres) of dry land per household. Plot holders then had a "comma" as it is popularly known. One hectare is 10 commas.

Phase 2 of the scheme rehabilitated a further 109 hectares (270 acres). The second phase saw allocation of commas to new farmer and addition of commas to existing farmers. In 1997 there were 850 plot holders with an average of 0.2 ha (0.49 acres) per farmer.

== Water source ==
It is fed by Exchange Dam which is on the Gweru River. Gweru River is a tributary of Shangani River. Exchange Dam is the biggest reservoir in Gweru River, followed by Insukamini Dam in Lower Gweru.

Exchange Dam, sometimes called Exchange Block Dam was built in 1972 primarily for irrigation. Its full capacity is 9 million cubic metres.

== Objectives ==
Primary objectives of the irrigation scheme was to equip farmers with a basic source of income materially and cash. Farmers could earn at least a sum equivalent to the government gazetted minimum wage by selling sweet green grocery produced from the irrigated land.

== Beneficiaries ==
About 900 farmers and their families who live near Exchange Irrigation Scheme are the primary beneficiaries of the scheme.

Most of the surrounding farmers have dry land rain-fed fields averaging 2.5 hectares. Livestock of these farmer also benefit by foraging at the adjacent bush that is evergreen and watered by spillage irrigation water.

== Management ==
The scheme was developed by Agritex, a department of the Ministry of Agriculture.

It is managed by the scheme management committee elected by participating farmers from among their members.

Maintenance is carried out by civil servants at the scheme in unison with the management committee, Agritex officers and plot holders.

== Irrigation ==
Irrigation water is pumped from the Exchange Block Dam into a night storage reservoir before being canal distributed into two other reservoirs further into the scheme for surface flooding of plots. Unlike Ngondoma Irrigation Scheme on the other side of Zhombe, this scheme water is driven by electric pumps.

The plots are 0.1 ha (0.25 acres) each and are arranged in blocks of 20 ha (49 acres) to 30 ha (74 acres) each. There are 6 blocks in total covering all the 165 active arable hectares.

The tertiary offtake gates are operated by hand by either the civil servants or members of the management committee. Water is shared evenly at one day per week for each block of the six blocks.

Sunday is reserved for night storage top-ups and for watering nursery beds in any block.

== Irrigation seasons ==
July–February is maize corn season and March–June is the beans and tomato season.

== Yields ==
Normally yields are 7,000 kg (15,000 lb) of corn (sold as green maize) per hectare and more than 1,000 kg/ha (890 lb/acre) for beans. At the market prices of $0.43/kg for green maize and $1.50/kg for beans, the two crops have a value of $3000/ha for maize and $1500/ha for beans, giving a combined harvest value of $4500/ha per year.

The values quoted above are based on the following; 700 kg per comma (per 0,1ha). Green maize is usually sold in dozens and a dozen has an average of 7 kg. With this assumption 1 comma would sell for US$300 at US$3 per dozen.

1000 kg/ha to 1200 kg/ha beans. That is 100 kg to 120 kg per comma of beans. Beans usually sell at US$1.50 per kg. (US$30/20 kg bucket).

== See also ==
- Ngondoma Irrigation Scheme
- Senkwasi Irrigation Scheme
- Zhombe
- Silobela
- Zibagwe RDC
