= Morgan Mahanya =

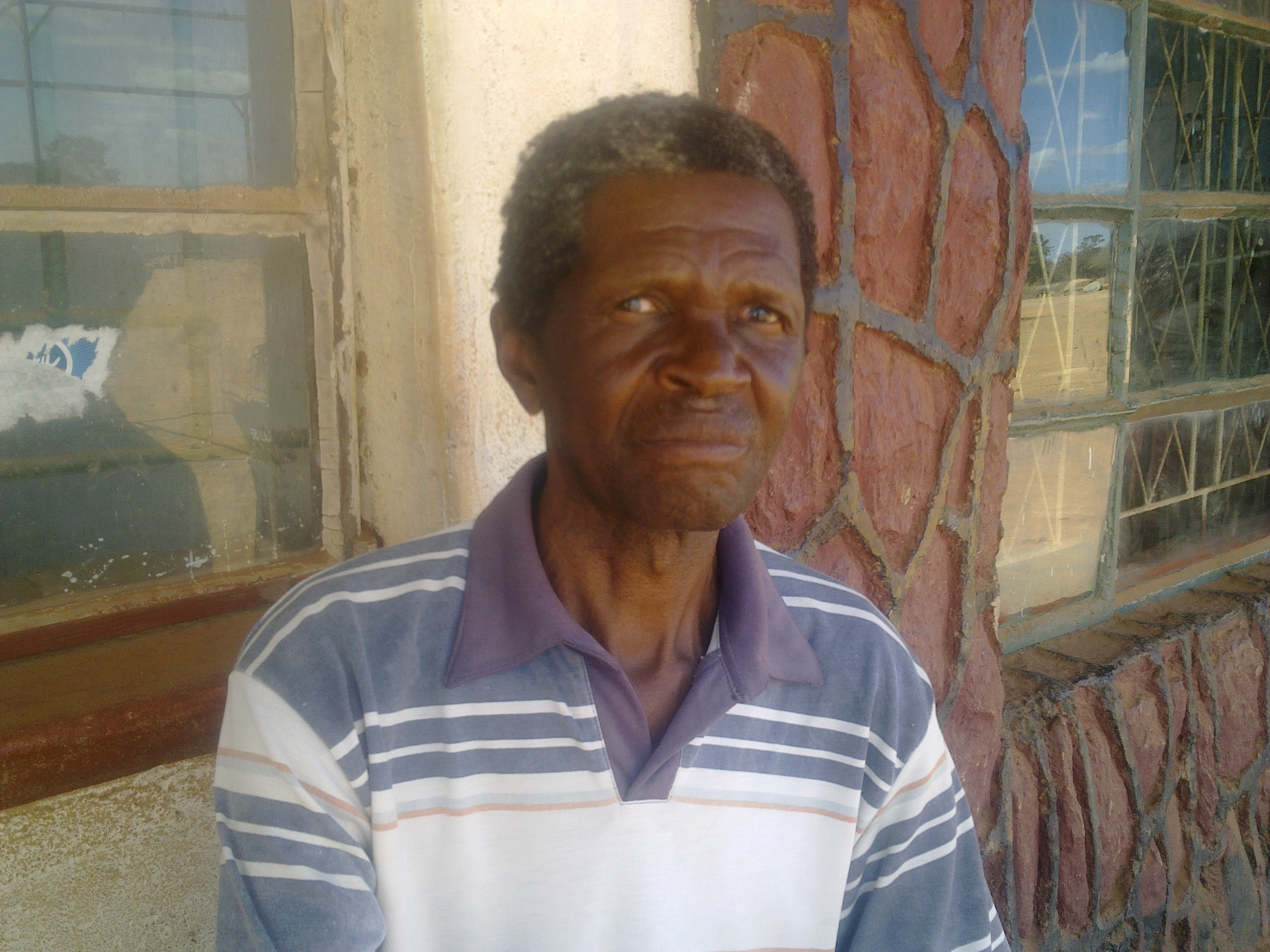
- Morgan Mahanya
- Born: Morgen Mahanya; 30 June 1948 (age 78); Zimuto Mission, Masvingo
- Citizenship: Zimbabwean
- Occupations: Novelist, playwright
- Spouse: Rebecca
- Writing career
- Language: Shona
- Years active: 1972–present
- Period: 1972–present
- Genres: Detective fiction, war fiction
- Notable awards: Literature in Shona 2nd Prize, 1991
- Website: twitter.com/MahanyaMorgen

Morgan Mahanya (born 30 June 1948) is a Zimbabwean Shona-language writer of detective fiction and war fiction. He has published 14 books since 1976, including books in Shona and in English, both fiction and nonfiction. Mahanya is one of the pioneering writers of detective stories in the Shona language. His books Chidamwoyo, Zvinoyera and The Wound are about the Rhodesian Bush War.

== Background ==
Morgan Mahanya was born at Zimuto Mission in Masvingo Province in a ChiShona-speaking family. His father Nicholas, who died in 1966, was the headman in Mahanya Village, Zimuto. Mahanya went to Mutatiri for primary school and Zimuto Mission for secondary school before joining Mambo Press as a shorytories freelance writer and contributor in 1972. He worked for the now defunct Moto Magazine in the 1970s. Mahanya also taught at Sherwood Primary School near Kwekwe from 1968 to 1970.

His first book published was Rufu Runobereka Rufu (Death begets death). He has since written 14 books, two of them in the English language.

Mahanya's novels have been used in several dissertations and theses.

Mahanya was a Sidakeni/Empress Mine ward councillor and the Mashambazhou Council chairman in the former Mashambazhou District Council from 1982 to 1991. He also was one of the five commissioners in the amalgamation of Kwekwe Rural Council and Mashambazhou District Council forming the Zibagwe Rural District Council in 1991–1993.

== Works ==
Mahanya has written 14 books, 12 of them in Shona.

- The Wound. ISBN 0-86922-493-X. English. Publisher: Gweru, Zimbabwe: Mambo Press, 1991. Series: Dandaro Readers.
- Takunda and Chipo in Storyland Forest: a tale of old and modern Zimbabwe. 90 pages. ISBN 0869225723, ISBN 978-0869225721. Juvenile audience. Language: English. Publisher: Gweru, Zimbabwe: Mambo Press, 1993. Series: Dandaro Readers.
- Chinotanga Mberi mashura. ISBN 0869222864, ISBN 978-0869222867. Language: Shona. Publisher: Gweru, Zimbabwe: Mambo Press, 1985.
- Chidamwoyo. 42 pages. ISBN 0869222163, ISBN 978-0869222164. Library of Congress: PL8681.9.M25 C5 1983. Language: Shona. Publisher: Gweru, Zimbabwe: Mambo Press in association with the Literature Bureau, 1983.
- Munzwa Mundove. 160 pages. ISBN 978-1779003270. Language: Shona. Publisher: Harare, Zimbabwe: College Press, 1999.
- Rufu Runobereka Rufu. Fiction. Language: Shona. Publisher: Salisbury: Longman Rhodesia, 18 October 1976.
- Zvinoyera. 167 pages. ISBN 0869224646, ISBN 978-0869224649. Fiction. Language: Shona. Publisher: Gweru: Mambo Press, 1989.
- Matsvamwoyo. ISBN 1779000774. Fiction. Language: Shona. Publisher: Harare: College Press, 1992.
- Mazvokuda Maronda Enyora. Fiction. Language: Shona. Publisher: Salisbury: Rhodesia Literature Bureau, 1978.
- Muroyi Royera Kure. 16 pages. Fiction. Language: Shona. Publisher: Salisbury: Rhodesia Literature Bureau, 1978.
- Ndomene Haichemedzi. Language: Shona. Publisher: Salisbury: Literature Bureau, 1980.
- "Chitsidzo Chedu". ISBN 978-1-77900-785-8. Language: Shona. Publisher: CollegePress 2022.
- Hapana Chinodyiwa Chisina Muzorera.
- Hondo yechimurenga. Mambo Press. A collection from various authors.

== Awards and recognition ==
- Munzwa Mundove is one of the African Language Vernacular Materials in UCLA Libraries: Shona.
- Munzwa Mundove, Chinotanga Mberi Mashura and Rufu Runobereka Rufu are school set books, for secondary schools in the Shona language examinations. Rufu Runobereka Rufu was the main set book in the Zimbabwe Schools Examinations Councils Shona Language Examination of Monday, 1 November 2004. Chinotanga Mberi Mashura was the main set book for the same language in the 2016 June session.
- Mahanya's book Zvinoyera was runner-up in the Shona category of the 1991 Zimbabwe Literary Awards.
- Chidamwoyo is listed among Zimbabwe drama and plays since 1958.
- Chidamwoyo and Rufu Runobereka Rufu are in the George Fortune Collection (George A. Smathers Libraries, University of Florida).

== Personal life ==
Mahanya is married to Rebecca and has four daughters. The last-born, Grace, is a budding novelist. He lives a humble life in Zhombe, Empress Mine Ward in a village called Totororo.

== See also ==
- Totororo Secondary School
