= Ngondoma Dam =

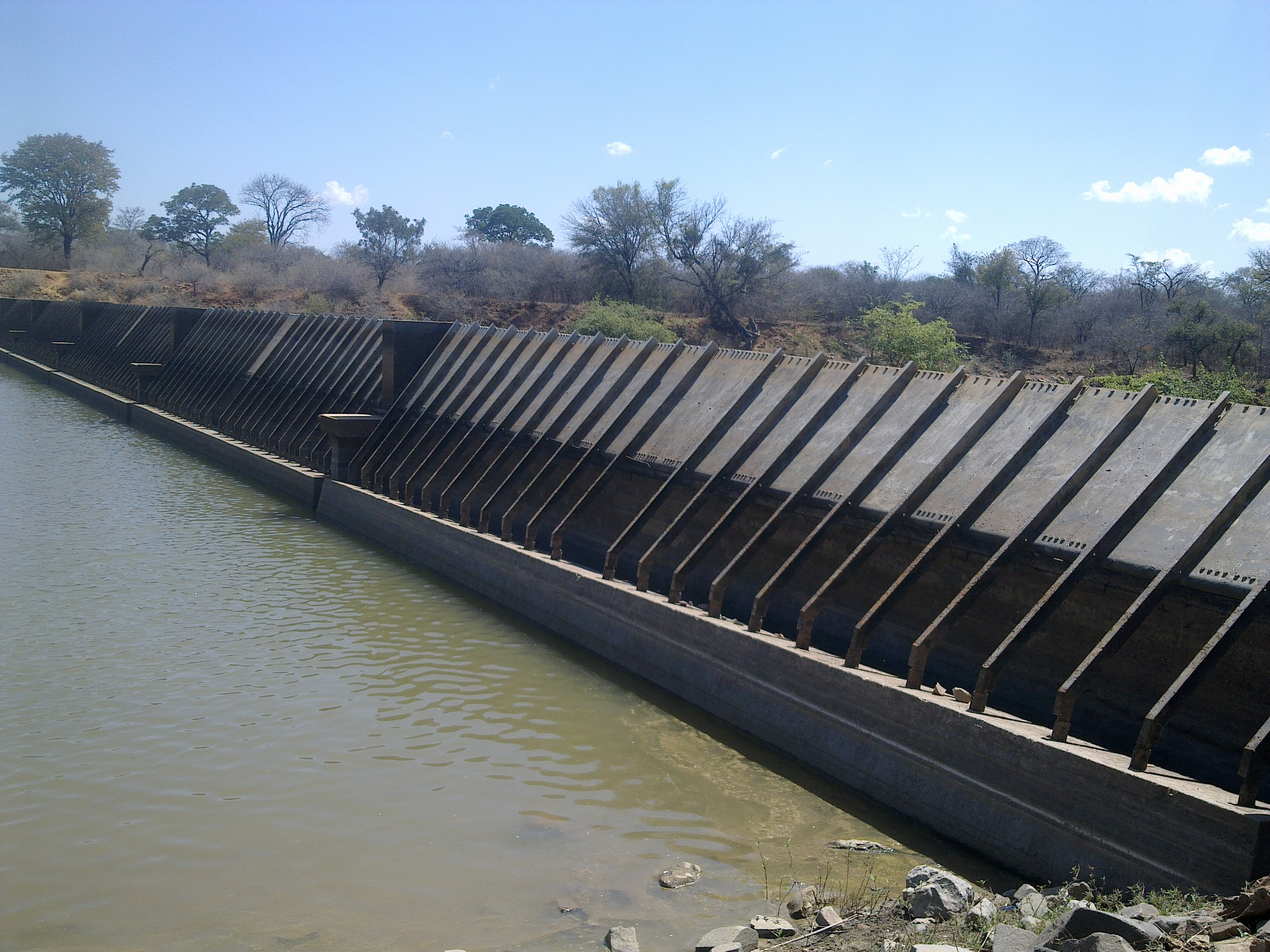
- Ngondoma Dam Spillway, August 2014

- Location within Zimbabwe
- Location: Empress Mine, Kwekwe District, Zimbabwe
- Coordinates: 18°27′26″S 29°24′50″E
- Purpose: Irrigation/water supply
- Construction began: 1967
- Opening date: 1968
- Owner: Ministry of Water Resources and Development (Zimbabwe)
- Operator: ZINWA

Dam and spillways
- Type of dam: Earth-filled embankment dam
- Impounds: Ngondoma River
- Dam volume: 7 million cubic metres
- Spillway type: Flap sluice gates

Ngondoma Dam is a dam on the Ngondoma River located 500 meters west of the Empress Mine Township in the Midlands Province of Zimbabwe. The dam is 67 kilometers northwest of the Kwekwe and 54 km southwest of Kadoma (by air).

The Zhombe Communal Land lies to the east of the dam, and the Chief Chisina, Gokwe land is on its west. The dam belongs to the Zhombe East, Kwekwe District, and is one of the 1,620 dams in the Midlands. Dams in this province make up 17% of all dams in Zimbabwe and are managed by ZINWA (Zimbabwe National Water Authority).

== Background ==
The Ngondoma Dam was constructed in 1967 to supply the Empress Nickel Mine and Ngondoma Irrigation Scheme with water in 1968. It supplies the government managed irrigation scheme 900 000 cubic metres of water per year.

== Operations ==
The Mapfungautsi Forest in Gokwe is the main drainage basin for surface runoff into the source tributaries of the Ngondoma River. The Ngondoma River has three sources - one in what was known as Ngondoma Crown Land, located just southwest of the Mapfungautsi Plateau in the Gokwe District, the second from the Chikombera River from the Gokwe end, and the third from the Chebechebe River on the Zhombe side. The Chikombera and Chebechebe rivers were both tributaries of Ngondoma River with the dam being constructed at their confluence.

== Siltation ==
The initial capacity of Ngondoma at the time of construction was 7 million cubic meters, enough to supply its intended beneficiaries. Siltation is affecting the dam's capacity, but no water shortage has been experienced yet. Ngondoma is an earth-filled dam with a simple Barrage dams mechanism at the far west end of the dam wall. It has an unmanned spillway system with fully automatic flap sluice gates.

Some villagers in the catchment areas practice stream bank cultivation and graze their animals in the catchment which leads to erosion upstream of the dam, resulting in siltation. Illegal gold panning upstream, especially on the Zhombe side of Ngondoma River, is also another source of siltation.

The Ngondoma Dam is in Zimbabwe's Agro-Ecological Region, where the average annual rainfall is 550 mm. Irrigation is therefore a critical investment in the area.

Soil erosion management upstream is lacking, and siltation in the Ngondoma reservoir is anticipated to continue. The Environmental Management Authority (EMA) seeks the cooperation of villagers and other stakeholders in the catchment area to help alleviate the problem. EMA is taking measures against riverbank saboteurs.

=== Beneficiaries ===
The dam provides drinking water for both livestock and people.

Apart from the irrigation scheme, the dam waters Empress Mine Growth Point, Columbina RSC, Villages this Zhombe side of the dam and the Gokwe side of it.

Legally or illegally, villagers use the dam water for watering gardens, livestock watering, brick moulding and other domestic purposes.

Fisheries' co-operatives have their share in the Ngondoma Dam too; however, aquaculture is not practised here even though multiple of fish species have been either caught or spotted in the Ngondoma Dam.

== Environmental damage ==
=== Canal water misuse ===
In the case of the Ngondoma Irrigation Scheme, water goes to the scheme from the dam through a 5.8 km gradient-driven open canal. Some villagers illegally take water from the canal to mould bricks and for the irrigation of small gardens along the canal. Some of this water overspills from these illegal gardens back into the Ngondoma River. This behaviour weakens water supply to the scheme yet water leaves the dam outlet full throttle.

=== Fish harvesting ===
Because Ngondoma Dam is in the communal lands, it has open access for fishing, and some illegal fishers overfish have depleted the fish population in the Ngondoma reservoir.

== Flora ==
Ngondoma Dam is surrounded by a rich flora as on record of the Flora of Zimbabwe. Immediately to the east of the dam has inviting beauty in flora such as the Acacia amythethophylla, Mopane, Euphorbia hirta, Jacaranda mimosifolia, Albizia harveyi, Lantana camara, Senna singueana, Typha capensis and Bauhinia macrantha just to name a few from the 112 records list compiled by Tessa Ball on November 9, 1996.

== See also ==
- Empress Mine Township, Zimbabwe
- Commoner, Zimbabwe
- Zhombe
- List of dams in Africa
