= Mabura =

Ward of Zibagwe Rural District Council, Zimbabwe

Mabura Ward is ward number 6 of the 33 wards in Zibagwe Rural District Council of Kwekwe District. It is in Zhombe Communinal Land in Midlands Province of Zimbabwe. It is 100 km north-west-north of Kwekwe and 73 km south-west of Kadoma. Its center is at Bee Mine Township but the sitting councillor operates from Samambwa Township.

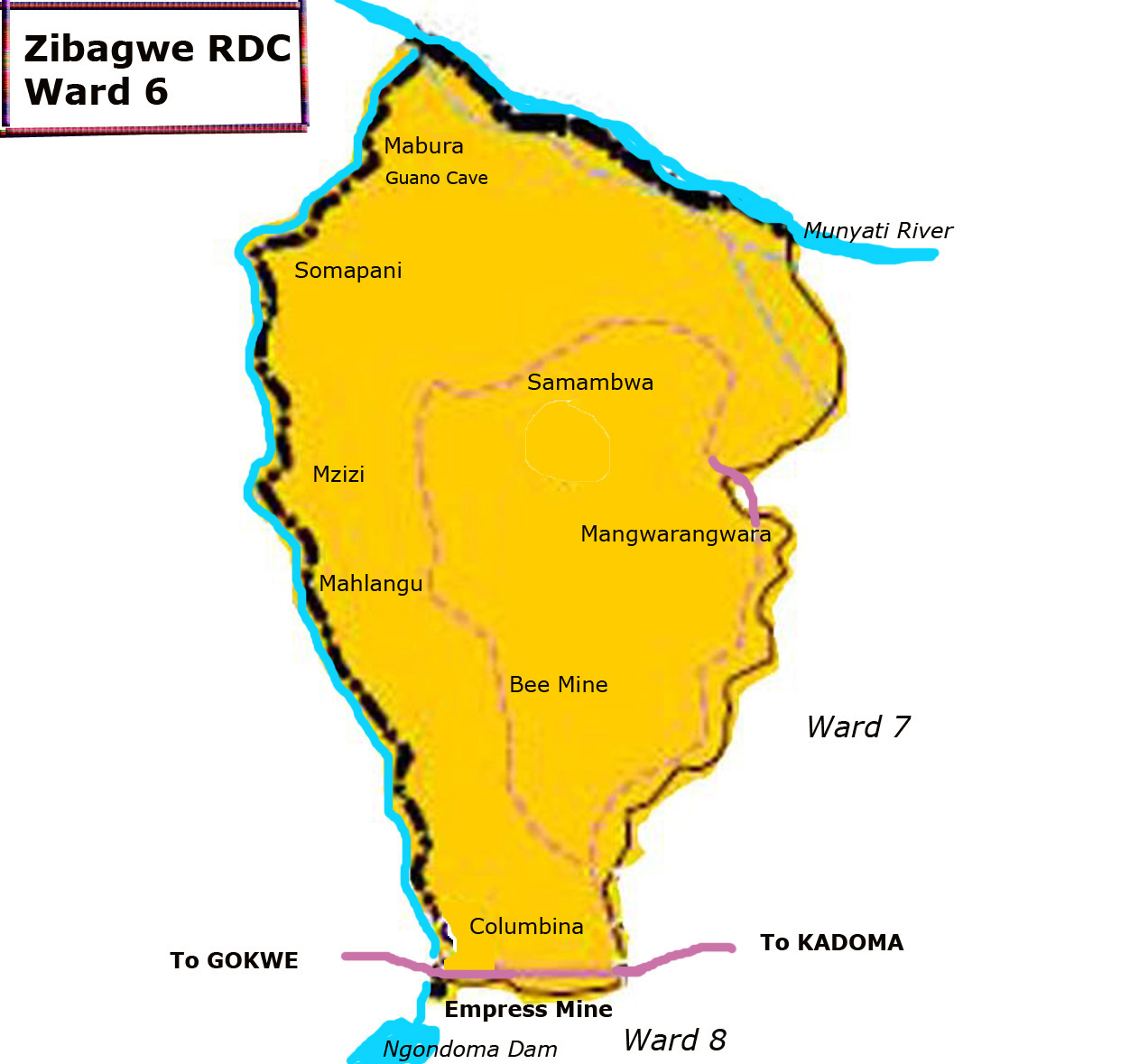
Zhombe Ward 6 map

== Municipality ==
The Zibagwe Rural District Council runs the ward and at present the ward is represented by a male councillor, on a ZANU-PF ticket.

== Shopping centers ==
- Bee Mine Township
- Columbina Township, 6.4 km south
- Samambwa Township, 13 km north-east

== Schools ==
=== Primary ===
==== Bee Mine Primary School ====
Bee Mine Primary School was established in 1969.

==== Samambwa Primary School ====
Samambwa Primary School is a co-educational school 19 km northeast of Empress Columbina Township. (18°19′20″S 29°27′14″E) It was established in 1964.

Samambwa Primary School offers primary educational services from Grade 1 to 7 over seven years. The age group for pupils is 6 to 13 years. Compulsory subjects are English, mathematics, and Shona. The school also offers various non-examinable practical subjects which include arts and craft, home economics, music, sports and physical education. These practicals are offered according to the school resources.

Graduates from this school proceed to Samambwa Secondary School a hundred metres south for a four-year GCE O-Level course.

==== Somapani Primary School ====
Somapani Primary School was established in 1966.

=== Secondary ===
- Bee Mine Secondary School, established in 1981
- Samambwa Secondary School, established in 1984

== Health center ==
Samambwa Clinic is the only health center in Mabura Ward. It is staffed by one qualified nurse and two nurse aides, and it has eight general beds. It is owned by Zivagwe Rural District Council.

== Other important places ==
- Commoner houses
- Ngondoma Irrigation Scheme
- Mabura Caves

== Notable residents ==
- Learnmore Jongwe was born in Samambwa Village, and this is where he was buried.
