= Communal land =

Territory owned by a community

Communal land is a (mostly rural) territory in possession of a community, rather than an individual or company. This sort of arrangement existed in almost all Europe until the 18th century, by which the king or the church officially owned the land, but allowed the peasants to work in them in exchange for a levy. These institutions still survive today in Switzerland and Sardinia.

== Existence ==
This system has also existed in Africa, Asia and America, and in some parts has persisted until today. A group or culture historically owns a piece of land and distributes it among its members, through the relevant authority. The good management of this land is veiled by the group itself, which can revoke the right of use to a farmer if this one is using it badly or for the wrong means.

The concept of communal land does not meet well with modern-day law, which is based on private property, so these territories more often than not are without a legal owner, which in law means it is property of the state. This has opened the door to cases of land grabbing by corporations, which has been the source of many conflicts and strife.

== Zimbabwe ==
The term communal land in Zimbabwe refers to certain rural areas within the country. Communal lands were formerly called Tribal Trust Lands (TTLs). Subsistence farming and small scale commercial farming are the principal economic activities in communal lands, there is usually limited additional employment apart from in a growth point and with jobs like teaching. Some communal lands have high population densities, and as a consequence overgrazing by cattle and goats and soil erosion can occur. The farms of communal lands are traditionally unfenced. Communal lands have resident traditional African Chiefs. Many communal lands are at a lower elevation than the richer commercial farms, and consequently experience higher average temperatures, and lower rainfall levels. Since independence, in communal lands, schools have been established and expanded, roads tarred, and electrification has spread. In recent years though, this development has slowed.

== Mexico ==
In Mexico communal land is known as the ejido. (see also the Chiapas conflict)
