= Ngondoma River =

River in Zimbabwe

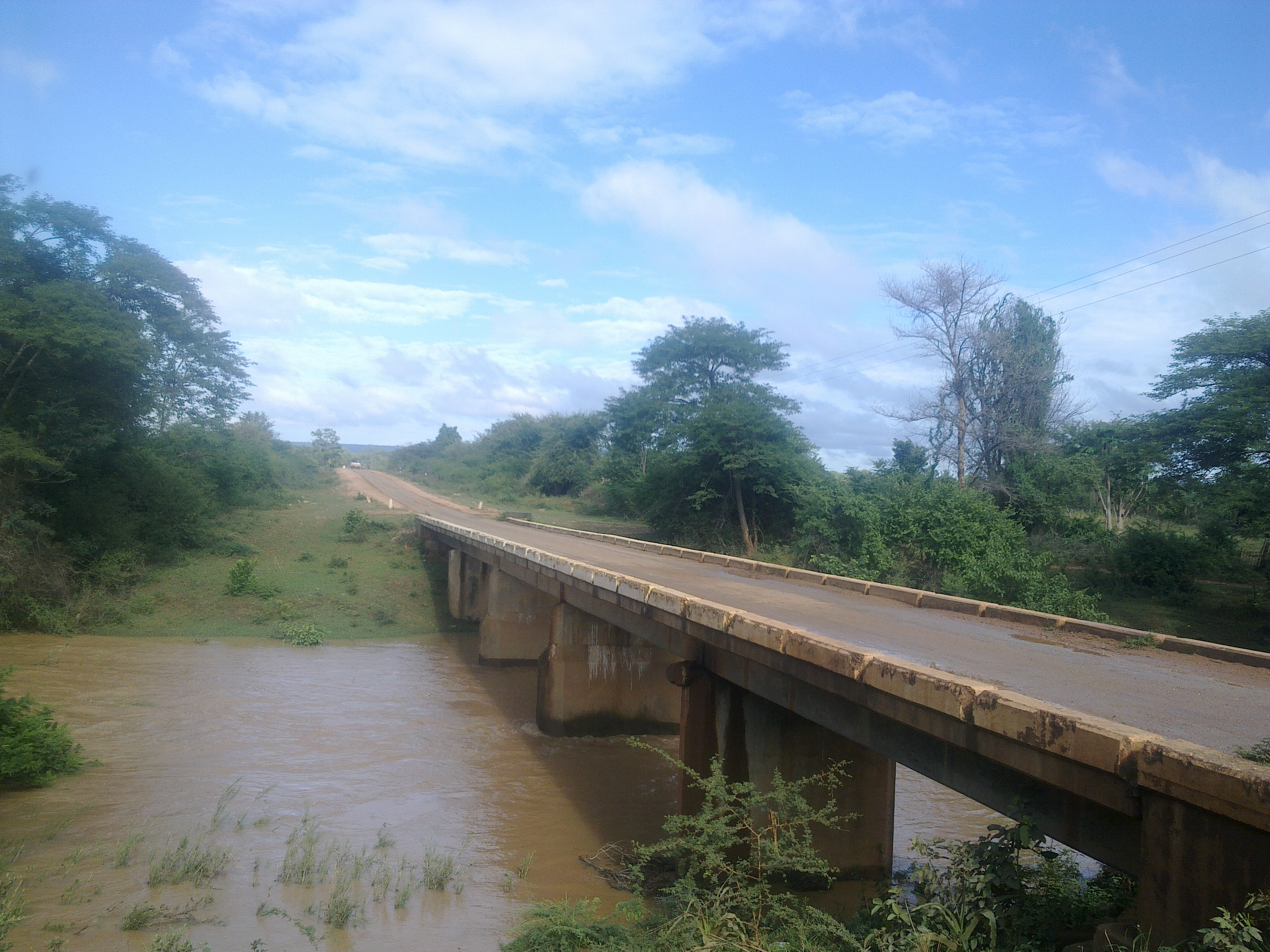
Ngondoma River

Ngondoma River is a river in Zhombe Communal Land, Kwekwe District in the Midlands province of Zimbabwe.

== Location ==
Ngondoma River is in the Midlands Province, although some claim it to be in Mashonaland West Province. Rivers are usually identified at their mouths, and the place where Ngondoma River flows into Munyati River is indeed Mashonaland. Munyati River serves as a border of the two, set several metres on the Midlands side. Just before its confluence with Munyati River, it passes over Mabura Caves, a bat guano mine in Somapani area of Zhombe.

== Sources ==
Ngondoma River rises in the northwest of Zhombe in what was known as Ngondoma Crown Land, However, the main drainage basin is the Mapfungautsi Forest on the Gokwe side of the river. It flows east and then northeast, where it forms part of the border with Gokwe, before entering the Munyati River.

== Tributaries ==
The main tributaries of Ngondoma River are:

- Ufafi River 18°35′30″S 31°16′11″E
- Mavulamachena River 18°13′33″S 28°16′59″E
- Chebechebe River 18°28′24″S 29°24′31″E
- Nevada River 18°29′34″S 29°25′08″E
- Chevecheve River 18°22′19″S 29°22′10″E
- Chikombera(Sikombela) River 18°29′11″S 29°23′55″E
- Mwembesi River whose source is also in the Mafungabusi Plateau forest.
- Korombina River whose confluence with Ngondoma River form the northern peripheral of Ngondoma Irrigation Scheme.

== Ngondoma Dam ==
In 1967, the Ngondoma Dam was constructed on the river 67 kilometres (42 mi) northwest of Kwekwe and 54 kilometres (34 mi) southwest of Kadoma (by air). The dam holds more than 7,000,000 cubic metres (250,000,000 cu ft) of water. It supplies the government managed Ngondoma Irrigation Scheme 900,000 cubic metres (32,000,000 cu ft) of water per year by a 5.8-kilometre (3.6 mi) gravity-driven concrete-lined canal.

== Bridges ==
Ngondoma River has two busy bridges. The larger one is across the Kwekwe-Gokwe Highway near Fafi School and the other one is on the Gokwe-Empress Road about 7 km down stream from the Ngondoma Dam.

== See also ==
- Empress Mine Township, Zimbabwe
- Zibagwe RDC
- Kwekwe-Gokwe Highway
- Zhombe River
