= Mabura Caves =

Large guano cave in Zimbabwe

Coordinates: 18.28775°S 29.40722°E

Mabura Guano Cave is a mine containing an accumulation of bat guano. It is located in Zhombe Mabura Ward 6 in the Midlands Province of Zimbabwe. It is one of the eight major reserves of organic fertilizers in Zimbabwe, that are still to be fully exploited.

It is listed as a Geographical place in Zimbabwe, and it is a natural monument, according to the Zimbabwean law.

It is located 2.5km south of the Munyati River and Ngondoma River confluence. It is 12km kilometres west of SAMAMBWA Primary School and 19 km north of Empress Mine.

According to the University of Guelph, (Canada) there is over two million tonnes of guano at Mabura Caves.

The cave is believed to stretch for more than 60 km to as far as Copper Queen in Gokwe passing underneath Ngondoma River.

Farmers in Zhombe East, Chief Samambwa's area particularly plot holders at Ngondoma Irrigation Scheme are the current immediate beneficiaries as guano is a highly effective fertilizer. It has very high content of nitrogen, phosphate, and potassium, the nutrients essential for growth in plants. In Zhombe, people believe the caves are sacred. It is thought that the Chinonyiwa family descendants are the sole custodians of the Mabura traditional rites. The Chinonyiwas act as guides and information sources when you get to Mabura Guano Caves.
