= Empress Mine Township, Zimbabwe =

Zimbabwean township

Empress Mine
- Township
- Nicknames: Empress Mine Township, Zimbabwe, Empress Growth Point
- Location in Zimbabwe
- Coordinates: 18°27′36″S 29°26′9.59″E
- country: Zimbabwe
- Province: Midlands
- District: Kwekwe
- Elevation: 1,020 m (3,350 ft)
- Time zone: UTC+2 (CAT)

Empress Mine Township is a populated place in the area formerly known as Salakuhle (misspelled as Salagushle) in Zhombe Communal Land, Kwekwe District of the Midlands Province in Zimbabwe. It is Zhombe's largest growth point yet officially it is rated second after Zhombe Joel, the current Zhombe District capital.

== Location ==
Empress Mine Township is about 70 km south-west of Kadoma by road, 98 km north-west of Kwekwe by the fastest route, and just 3 km south of Columbina Rural Service Center.

== History ==
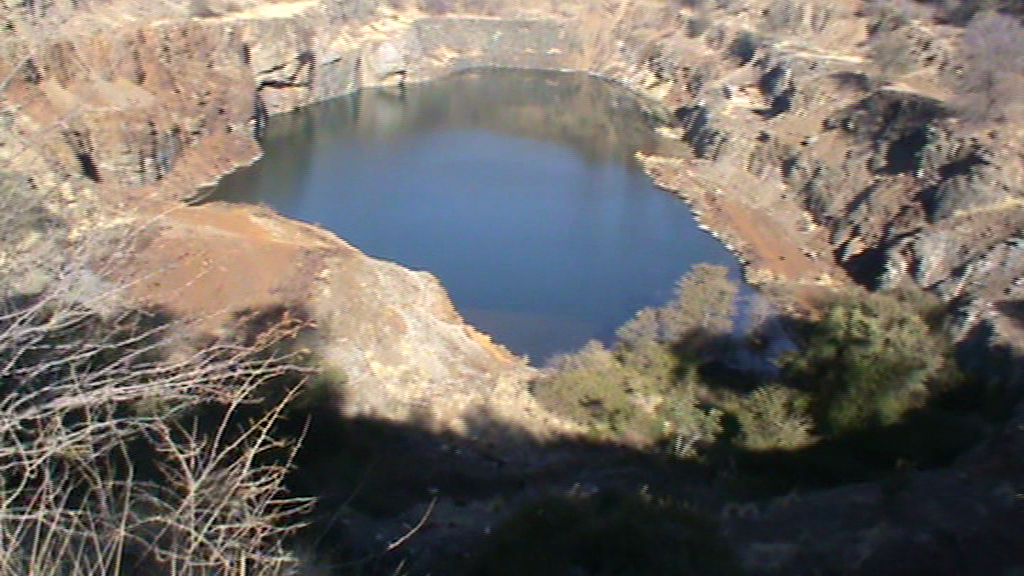
Empress Mine Opencast August 18, 2014

The first houses at Empress Mine Township were built in 1968 when Empress Nickel Mine was established, twelve years after Rio Tinto Southern Rhodesia Limited was initially incorporated on August 29, 1956 to develop and mine the Empress Nickel deposit. RioZim as it is called now, was the first mining operation Rio Tinto set up outside Europe.

=== Residential areas ===
There were two residential areas, one for whites and the other for Africans.

==== Empress Mine Township ====
What was known as Empress Mine Township was the Whites only suburban location which was a low density area with bigger houses and a better set-up.

Former workers of Cam and Motor Mine were quick to call the low density suburban township maCammera meaning at Cammera"; CAMMERA being short for "Cam and Motor Mine European Residential Area", because it reminded them of the CAMMERAs at Eiffel Flats, Kadoma and Martin Spur near Kadoma. To this day the low density area is referred to as kumaCAMMERA, meaning "at CAMMERA". the first black families to live in this area were the Mugadza chinamora families

Facilities At the peak of Empress Nickel Mine's operations, the low-density residential area included a primary school, a clubhouse, a squash court, a tennis court, a bowling club, and churches, though it did not have a secondary school. Secondary school students attended boarding schools in Kadoma, traveling there by bus on Sunday afternoons and returning on Friday afternoons.

==== Mopani Township ====
Mopani Township was an all blacks township with various types of houses some of which were sub-standard. However many blacks had not been exposed to the best of houses, and they were comfortable in those houses. Not all houses for blacks were undesirable; some met even the standards of today's smaller houses.

Facilities Residents of Mopani Township had no complain in terms of recreational facilities let alone swimming pools and state of the art type of facilities. Senior black officers and teachers had their residence between the low and high density suburban along Micah Crescent which is now Machabango Crescent after a long serving building instructor at Rio Tinto Agricultural College.

=== Community service ===
Apart from building houses that will remain after the closure of the mine, During its heyday Empress Mine Township was the center of all activity and provided many families with sustenance in the form of employment and other spillover benefits.

- Columbina Rural Service Center was built to serve customers from the adjacent Empress Mine.
- The road from the main Harare-Bulawayo road was tarred for smooth flow of transport serving Empress Nickel Mine.
- Electricity to the mine made the surrounding townships and those along the pylons lines to be connected to the grid. All these remain to this day though the 9 foot tarred roads needs attention.

== Deterioration ==
Empress Mine was established in 1968 based on a proved and probable ore reserve of twenty million tonnes. Empress Mine initial production was 55 000 tonnes per month from underground. When the opencast came into production in 1970 total tonnage rose to 85 000 tonnes per month. In 1976 the opencast reached its far depth and the underground mining had to reach the 85 000 tonnes per month without the opencast operation. Empress closed down in 1982. The Rio Tinto Group who owned Empress Nickel Mine cited economic fall down of nickel prices and the mine could not continue in such an environment. Empress Nickel Mine employed about 1,400 workers who faced retrenchment; to save their jobs the government gave a $3.5 million loan to Rio Tinto to sustain the mine for at least 3 more years but still the mining company could not do with then economic environment. The government wanted to keep Empress Nickel Mine open until 1986. In 1985 the closure was sealed with no hope of reopening.

At the closure of the mine both township were left into a ghost city. The government temporally housed soldiers in wait for the completion of their Ngezi barracks a few tens of kilometres away. When the army left the then Ministry of National Affairs placed a couple of unarmed civilian guards at the low density township but they were out done by vandals over the years.

By year 2000 most houses in both townships were beyond repair. It was then that local people and others from other towns and provinces were allocated houses to up-keep, renovate and maintain them. The program was not a successful one until the local Zibagwe Rural District Council took over and re-allocated the houses in both townships to willing buyers on lease agreements.

== Ownership ==
After the army left ownership of the houses was taken by the then Ministry of national Affairs. Empress Mine Township is now owned by the Local Government arm, the Zibagwe Rural District Council. (The township, Totororo, Nevada and Bhamala villages make Empress Mine Ward under one councilor.) Individual houses are owned by the current owners under a lease agreement with the Zibagwe Rural District Council. The council has however not started receiving rents from the house owners but the initial down-payment.

== Current state ==
Both townships are now known as Empress Mine Township or rather Empress Mine Growth point. Houses in both the low and high density suburban townships are being renovated by the new owners. The whole area is coming to life again though still far from its former beauty.

=== Water reticulation ===
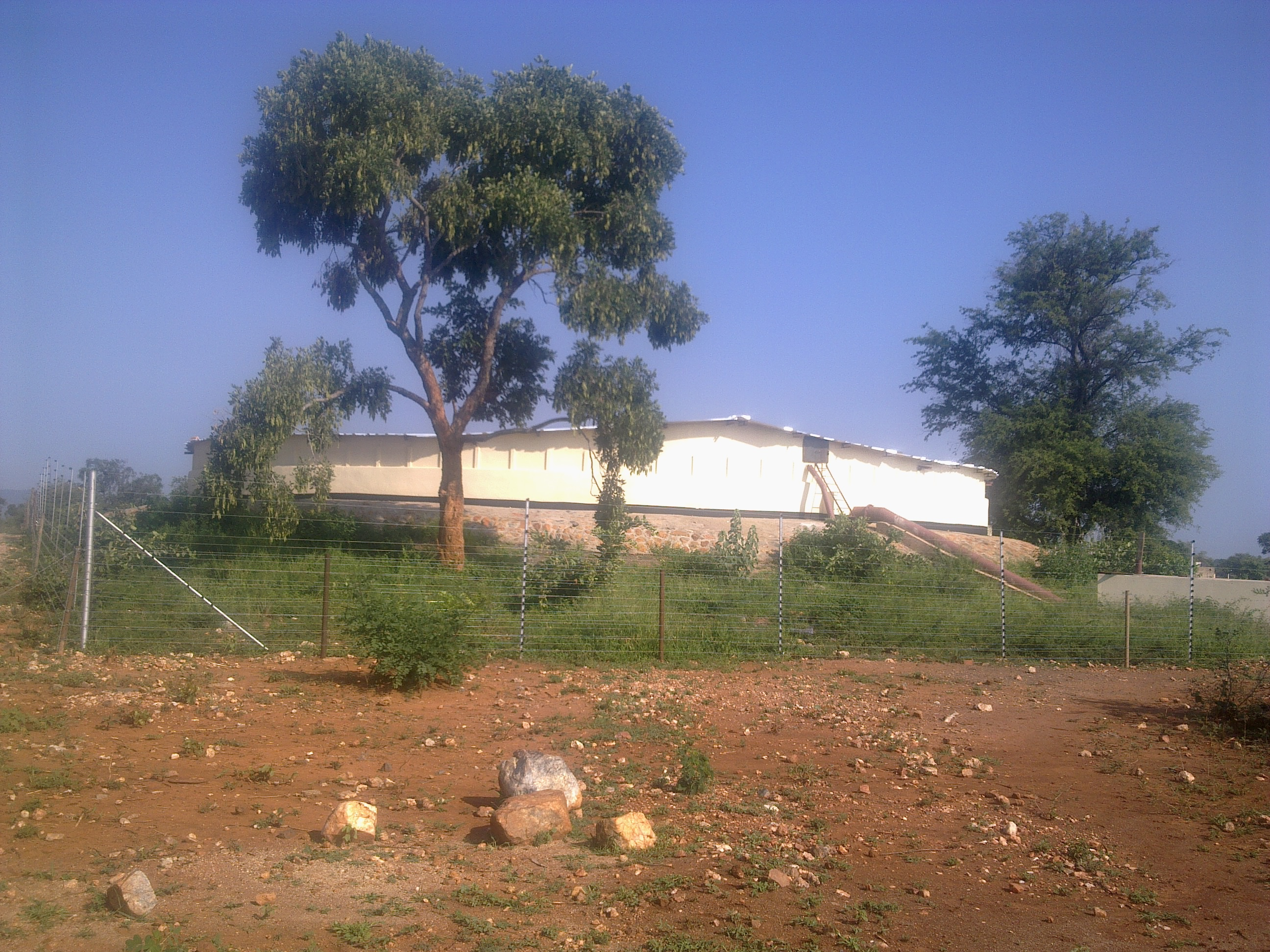
Empress Mine Township water tanks

Presently residents fetch water from Rio Tinto College piped water and from a borehole at Mopani School. There are no in-house tapes yet but the Zibagwe RDC has already put underground pipes and rebuilt the huge water tank to connect Mopani Township to piped water.

Rio Tinto College water is supplied by a pipeline from Ngondoma Dam about 2 km west by an electric powered water pump. The dam also supplies Ngondoma Irrigation Scheme, Columbina Rural Service Center and the surrounding villages this and the Gokwe side of the Ngondoma River.

== Electric power ==
Electricity has not yet been reconnected as most poles and wires are missing. Electricity is currently at Rio Tinto College and houses in Machabango Crescent (Micah Crescent) only. Most residents use solar energy and fuel driven generators for electricity. However, Columbina Rural Service Center close by is fully electrified.

== Government facilities ==
- The Registrar

General sub office is at the Old Empress Mine Offices, next to the ZRP Samambwa Base where people can register for National IDs, births and deaths.

- The Zimbabwe Republic Police is at the location mentioned above.
- Rio Tinto College of Agriculture located between the low and high density suburban townships. (It is also known as RioZim Foundation Zhombe Agricultural College.)

The college was formerly Empress Nickel Mine's Building Center, where prospective brick-layers and builders were taught skills and techniques of their trade. Just before the mine closed the center was given to the Ministry of Lands and Agriculture who turned it into an agricultural training institute before it gained the college status.

Rio Tinto Agricultural College is wholly owned by the state and is affiliated to the Midlands State University. It offers diplomas in agricultural science and practice over three years for students of either sex. It has classic boarding hostels for both male and female students. Over the three years students study horticulture, agronomy, farm engineering, animal husbandry and farm & agri-business, with practice in all subjects.

Most graduates from here are employed by the Ministry of Agriculture as extension workers. However some students opt for other fields after graduation. Some join the Ministry of Education as agriculture teachers in secondary schools. Such graduates need only one year at the Teachers' colleges for them to be qualified teachers of agriculture in secondary schools.

The college has a sizable herd of dairy cows, a beef herd, poultry, piggery, rabbitry, and they also keep turkeys and ducks for training and college sustenance purposes.

The college is headed by a qualified agriculturalist, author, and former University of Zimbabwe lecturer who is a farmer himself, Eng. D. V. Chiuswa.

Staff houses are within the campus and a couple others at Machabango Crescent (formerly Micah Crescent) where part of the college staff resides side by side with Mopani Primary School teachers. Houses at the Machabango Crescent cluster have electricity and piped water with reservoir tanks at the site.

- Rio Tinto College of Agriculture Clinic which is staffed by a state registered nurse and several nurse-aides serving the college staff, students, and pupils from Mopani, Commoner and Nyaradzo schools and the Empress Mine Township community.

== Schools ==
=== Mopani Primary School ===
Mopani Primary School was established in 1975. It is located at Empress Mine Township, Zimbabwe 92 km north-west of Kwekwe and 70 km south-west of Kadoma. The school was owned by Empress Mine until 1982 when the mine closed shop and handed over the school to the local community.

Mopani offers educational services from Grade 1 to Grade 7 for both boys and girls. Graduates from this school go to Nyaradzo Secondary School.

The Zimbabwe Electoral Commission has used the school as one of the six polling stations in Zhombe.

==== Alumni ====
- Rodreck Mutuma

=== Commoner Primary School ===
Other pupils who cannot make it to Mopani Primary School go to Commoner Primary School which is adjacent to Nyaradzo Secondary School. Commoner Primary School established in 1954 as Salakuhle School (Salagushe School) is south while Commoner Mine is north of Empress Mine Township.

- Outside Empress Mine Township RioZim Foundation facilitated the building of Rio Tinto Zhombe High School at Zhombe Center along the Kwekwe-Gokwe Highway. It started as an F2 school which offered the National Certificate of Education NCE, but at independence it was turned to the standard that offers the General Certificate of Education GCE.

=== Empress Primary school ===
Initially reserved for the whites. Located with a secure gated community. Prior to independence a few black families whose fathers had excelled and promoted to ranks that allowed them to move into this selective community. The children were also then allowed to attend this private school.

== Other facilities ==
Soccer stadiums There are two working soccer grounds in Empress Mine Township. They were originally 3 but the one at the low density has since been closed by nature.

- Mopani Township still boasts of the best soccer stadium in all Zhombe with two urban kind grandstands. The stadium is used mostly by Mopani Primary School which is only a few meters west.
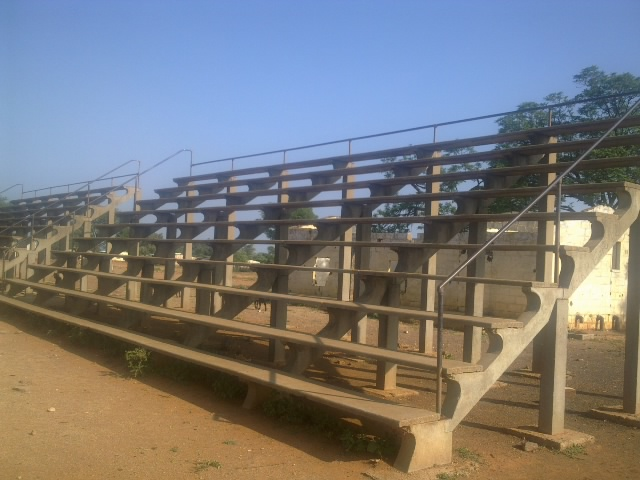
  Mopani Primary School stadium
- Rio Tinto College has a sunken stadium surrounded by bougainvillea and other good-looking trees of various species and cultivar, the type found nearer Ndondoma Dam. It has a very pleasant atmosphere and the grandstands are on one side only. This stadium was nicknamed Gwanzura because of its sunken resemblance to Harare's Gwanzura Stadium in Highfield, Harare,

== Amenities ==
There are no standard shopping centers in Empress Mine Township since the closure of Empress Nickel Mine. For quick groceries and bites residents rely on Rio Tinto College Club Kiosk and several tuck-shops in both the high and low density locations. Columbina Rural Service Center is Empress Mine Township's main shopping center and bus station. Transit travellers mistake Columbina-Machipisa for Empress Mine Township because all buses destined for Empress rank at Columbina.

== See also ==
- Empress Mine Ward
- RioZim Foundation Zhombe Agricultural College
- Ngondoma Irrigation Scheme
- Commoner, Zimbabwe
