= List of secondary schools in Midlands Province =

This is a list of secondary schools in Midlands Province in Zimbabwe, sorted by district.

== Chirumhanzu District ==
- Chamakanda Secondary School
- Chengwena Secondary School
- Chishuku Secondary School
- Chizhou Secondary School
- Taringana Secondary School
- Driefontein High School
- Gonawapotera Secondary School
- Lalapanzi Secondary School
- Leopold Takawira High School
- Hama Secondary School
- Hillview Secondary School
- Holy Cross High School
- Mapiravana Secondary School
- Mukomberanwa Secondary School
- Mushandirapamwe Secondary School
- Mutenderende Secondary School
- New England Secondary School
- Orton's Drift Secondary School
- Rambakombwa Secondary School
- Siyahokwe Secondary School
- Upfumba Secondary School

== Gokwe North District ==
- Chinyenyetu High School
- Chireya High School
- Chisina Secondary School
- Chomuuyo Secondary School
- Copper Queen Secondary School
- Denda Secondary School
- Dukaupfu Secondary School
- Gandavaroyi Secondary School
- Gumunyu Secondary School
- Mbovhana Secondary School
- Musadzi Secondary School
- Nembudziya Rural Government Secondary School
- Nyamazengwe Secondary School
- Nyamuroro Kubatana Secondary School
- Sumbe Secondary School
- Tanda Secondary School
- Tare Secondary School
- Tongwe Secondary School

Nenyunka Secondary school Semchembo high 1 Semchembo high 2 Zhomba high Burure high Musikavanhu Secondary Gurawakanya Secondary Dambamazura Secondary Gwevo Secondary Nevana Secondary Mudondo Secondary Batsirai (Kuwirirana) Secondary Mashame Secondary Vumba Secondary Mavanga Secondary Gumunyu high Madzivazvido Secondary Hongoro Secondary

== Gokwe South District ==
- Bengwe Secondary School
- Chevecheve High School
- Cheziya Gokwe High School
- Chidoma Secondary School
- Chitombo Secondary School
- Defe Secondary School
- Ganye Secondary School
- Gawa Secondary School
- Gomoguru Secondary School
- Gukure Secondary School
- Gwamure High School
- Hovano Secondary School
- Kana Secondary School
- Kasango Secondary School
- Kasuwe Secondary School
- Kushinga-Rumhuma Secondary School
- Logos Empowerment Girls High School
- Mateme Secondary School
- Mateta 2 Secondary School
- Mateta Rujeko Secondary School
- Marimasimbe Secondary School
- Machakata Secondary School
- Mapfungautsi Secondary School
- Masuka Secondary School
- Mkoka Secondary School
- Muchadei Secondary School
- Nemangwe Secondary School
- Ngomeni Secondary School
- Njelele Secondary School
- Nyaje Secondary School
- Nyaradza Secondary School
- Nyoka Secondary School
- Sai Secondary School
- Sasikari Tanda Secondary School
- Sengwa High School
- Sunganai Secondary School
- St. Paul's Gokwe High School

== Gweru District ==
- Ascot Secondary School
- Anderson Adventist High School
- Chaplin High School
- Fletcher High School
- Guinea Fowl High School
- Gunde High School
- Lingfield Christian Academy
- Loreto High School
- Lower Gweru Adventist High School
- Maboleni Secondary School
- Mambo High School
- Matinunura High School
- Mdubiwa Secondary School
- Midlands Christian College
- Mkoba 1 High School
- Mkoba 3 High School
- Nashville Secondary School
- Nhlangano Secondary School
- Nkululeko High School
- Ntabamhlope Secondary School
- Regina Mundi High School
- Sacred Heart College (Zimbabwe)
- Senka Secondary School
- Sibomvu High School
- Sikombingo Secondary School
- St. Patrick's High School
- Tangwena Secondary School
- Thornhill High School
- Vungu Secondary School
- Whata Secondary School

Progress Christian College

== Kwekwe District ==
- Amaveni High School
- Batanai High School
- Bee Mine Secondary School
- Bhamhara Secondary School
- Camelot College
- Drake Secondary School
- Donjane Secondary School
- Dosa Secondary School
- Fatima High School
- Globe & Phoenix Secondary School
- Goldridge College
- Kwekwe High School
- Loreto High School
- Manunure High School
- Mbizo High School
- McFadden High School
- Ntombankala Secondary School
- Ntobe Secondary School
- Nyaradzo Secondary School
- Rio Tinto Zhombe High School
- Rujeko High School
- Rutendo High School
- Samambwa Secondary School
- Sidakeni Secondary School
- Shungu High School
- Silobela High School
- Tombankala Secondary School
- Totororo Secondary School
- Wozoli Secondary School

== Mberengwa District ==
- Bayayi Secondary School
- Chapungu Secondary School
- Chegato High School
- Chegute High School
- Chemimwe Secondary School
- Chingoma Secondary School
- Chizungu High School
- Chomusenda Secondary School
- Chouragu Secondary School
- Chovuragu Secondary School
- Dekeza Secondary School
- Funye Secondary School
- Guruva Secondary School
- Mabika Secondary School
- Madenyika Secondary School
- Makuva High School
- Maringambizi Secondary School
- Masase High School
- Matabo Secondary School
- Mataruse Secondary School
- Mavorovondo Secondary School
- Mbuya Nehanda High School
- Mketi Secondary School
- Mnene High School
- Mposi Secondary School
- Murerezi Secondary School
- Musume High School
- Rengwe Secondary School
- Ruzengwe Secondary School
- Svita Secondary School
- Vubwe Secondary School
- Vurasha High School
- Vuronga Secondary School
- Vutika Secondary School
- Vutsanana Secondary School
- Zvamagwiro Secondary School
- Zvamatohwe Secondary School
- Zvavashe Secondary School
- Zverenje Secondary School
- Zvomukonde Secondary School

== Shurugwi District ==
- Batanai Secondary School
- Bokai Secondary School
- Chikwingwizha Secondary School
- Chironde-Kwagweya Secondary School
- Chrome High School
- Chivakanenyanga Secondary School
- Dombotombo Secondary School
- Dorset Secondary School
- Gamwa Secondary School
- Gare High School
- Gato High School
- Hanke Adventist High School
- Ihwerehwenga Secondary School
- Juchuta Secondary School
- Kushinga High School
- Mupangayi Secondary School
- Nyamakari Secondary School
- Pakame High School
- Parkinson High School
- Rusununguko Secondary School
- Sibolise Secondary School,
- Shiku Secondary School
- Shurugwi 2 High School
- Svika High School
- Takunda Secondary School
- Tongogara High School
- Zhaugwe Secondary School
- Zviumwa Secondary School

== Zvishavane District ==
- Bera Secondary School
- Chachitsa Secondary School
- Dadaya High School
- Dambudzo Secondary School
- Govarizadze Secondary School
- Korogwe High School
- Mabasa Secondary School
- Mandava High School
- Musikati Secondary School
- Ngomeyebani Secondary School
- Nyatsime College
- Utongani Secondary School
- Wasima Secondary School
- Zvishavane High School

== Former schools ==
- Emerald Hill School for the Deaf (founded in Kwekwe and moved to Harare in 1979)

== See also ==
Logos Girls High School.

- List of schools in Zimbabwe
