= Silobela =

Silobela Silobela
- Village
- Location in Zimbabwe
- Coordinates: 18.984258°S 29.299732°E
- Country: Zimbabwe
- Province: Midlands
- District: Gweru
- Time zone: UTC+2 (CAT)

Silobela is an agricultural Resettlement in Kwekwe District in the Midlands Province of Zimbabwe. It is located about 60 kilometres (37 mi) west of Kwekwe town, 80 kilometres (50 mi) north-west of Gweru town, and bordering Nkayi on the west.

== Background ==
Most of the inhabitants of Silobela were relocated from the area between Gweru and Bulawayo (called Hogo) in the 1940s to allow for white commercial farmers to take up that land. Most of the population is Ndebele and they speak the isiNdebele language.

== Centers ==
A major centre in Silobela is the Loreto Mission which incorporates the Loreto High School, a Roman Catholic boarding school, the Loreto Hospital, which is the largest medical centre in the region, and the Police Station with detention cells. Also in the vicinity is an irrigation co-operative and a business centre with a supermarket, beer outlets and greengrocer's. The Gweru River passes just to the east of Loreto.

=== Crossroads District Service Center ===
Crossroads Growth Point is the commercial hub of Silobela. It is about 80 km Southwest of Kwekwe. From this center one roads leads to Gweru, the other to Nkayi and the other to the northern villages of Silobela, and still the main one to Kwekwe, hence Crossroads.

=== Silobela Old People's Home ===
The Silobela Old people's Home was built on a 20 hectare farm, which was donated by the Government in 1979.

== Villages ==
The Resettlement is divided into smaller undocumented areas each with several primary schools and fewer secondary schools. A non-exhaustive list of these smaller areas includes

- Grid 13, koMjika
- Lahleka,
- Nyakwathi,
- Donsa,
- Rungu
- Ndlamatuli
- Simana,
- Ntobe,
- Mtshogwe,
- Nzwananzi,
- Malisa, chief
- BB,
- Common range,
- Gobo,
- Ruya,
- Sinangeni,
- Sikhumbatshokotshe,
- Mahlathini,
- Bharanke
- Kanye,
- Abifoil,
- Green,
- Jena Mines
- Zibomvu'
- Mtshikitsha'
- Mbombela
- KoParker

== Economy ==
Silobela is known for its rich gold deposits. There have been reports of people finding exposed gold deposits in their back yards. Gold has been mined in the past by the now inoperative Turtle Mine, and by Empress Mine and Leopard Mine, now jointly known as Jena Mines. Currently, the Jena Mines, together with thousands of illegal gold panners, are actively extracting gold in the area. There is also Exchange Irrigation Scheme which is in Silobela Constituency and is administered by Silobela Offices yet geographically it is in Zhombe Communal Land.

=== Jena Mine ===
Jena Mine is owned by the Kuvimba Mining house (pvt) ltd.

Jena Mine has seen both odd and even economic times but the ZMDC keeps resuscitating it. Of late a new power line from the thermal Munyati Power Station has enhanced gold production at Jena Mine. but local Solobela has not seen much improvements economically even though Jena Mine produces about 40 kg of gold each month.

However, Jena Mine is the biggest gold producer in the Midlands Province employing over 600 people.

== See also ==
- Kwekwe District
- Zibagwe RDC
