= Rio Tinto Zhombe High School =

High school in Zimbabwe

Coordinates: 18.57872°S 29.35143°E

Information
- Established: 1977; 49 years ago
- Gender: Mixed

Rio Tinto Zhombe High School is a school in Kwekwe District of the Midlands Province in Zimbabwe.

It is a mixed (Day and Boarding) school for both sexes.

Rio Tinto Zhombe High School is at Zhombe Growth Point 60 km northwest of Kwekwe and 80 km southeast of Gokwe closer to a township named Joel in Zhombe. The school is on the high road and is recognized by a sign post with a name and a logo.

== Background ==
It was the first secondary school in Zhombe Tribal Trust Land now Zhombe Communal land

Construction began in 1976 and ended in 1978. The first batch of students began in January 1977. It was an F2 Technical Secondary School then, the system phased out now.

RioZim Foundation built the school with the then government of Rhodesia's MIDLAND S PROVINCIAL AUTHORITY helping by injecting $20 000 in the project in 1976. However the school was owned by RioZim Foundation for 5 years. It was handed over to the then Mashambazhou District Council, now Zibagwe Rural District Council in 1982.

== Operations ==
The school opened to students in 1977. It offers educational services up to Form 6. It is the only conversional boarding school in Zhombe.

The pass rate is very good. In 2014 the school was 84th of the top 100 secondary schools Zimbabwe.

== Facilities ==
Rio Tinto Zhombe High School has building facilities which are classrooms, science laboratories, computer laboratories, library, staffroom, girls hostels, boys hostels, dining hall, ric hall.

The school has the following sports play ground:

- Soccer field
- Tennis court
- Basketball court
- Netball field
- Volleyball field
- Track and Field Anthete
