= Zhombe Joel =

Coordinates: 18.677197°S 29.34916°E

- Township
- Nickname: Joel Business Center
- Interactive map of Zhombe Joel
- Country: Zimbabwe
- Province: Midlands
- District: Kwekwe District
- Municipality: Zibagwe Rural District Council

Joel Business Centre is the location of district administrative offices, parliamentary advisory offices, the post office and police station in the town of Zhombe, Zimbabwe. It is 64 km northwest of Kwekwe and 77 km southeast of Gokwe Centre. This small rural town center is the hub of both Zhombe Communal Land and Zhombe Central Ward.

== Name ==
Joel Business Centre, in Zhombe Central ward, is named in honour of Joel Tessa, one of the pioneer businessmen at the centre during the 1960s. Tessa was one of the first shop owners at Zhombe Centre, also known as Zhombe Growth Point or Zhombe Joel. He is thought to have died during the Rhodesian bush war in the late 1960s.

=== Joel Tessa's role in the liberation war ===
There was a restriction or detention camp for suspected and proven influential political activists called Sikombela, north of Zhombe centre, which had been established in June 1965. It was mainly a detention camp for cadres aligned to ZANU. This camp is now a national monument. Joel Tessa is known to have collaborated with the Sikombela inmates and served as a courier of top secret errands. Edson Muzite refers to him as "Jewel", a Rhodesia Bush War collaborator; a mujibha as they were called. Edison Mzite is one of the less prominent ex-detainees of Sikombela Restriction Camp Muzite credits Joel Tessa as a comrade in arms as far as top secrecy is concerned.

Local people say war collaborators like Joel Tessa were not easily detected by the then security forces because Sikombela Restriction Camp was deep in Mapfungautsi State Forest where predators were rife and no one would dare visit the camp at will. War collaborators took advantage of the weakness of the security forces in this area and they worked well with the inmates at Sikombela. Local people supporting the liberation war visited the restriction camp regularly, the authorities seemingly allowing frequent interaction at first.

It was however not long before the authorities suspected foul play and stiffened conditions. Joel is thought to have been caught up by the Rhodesian Intelligence when their suspicions were aroused about activities at Sikombela Restriction Camp.

Many war collaborators during the bush war disappeared from the public and many have never been traced. Edison Sithole and his secretary Miriam Mhlanga were some of the people whose whereabouts remain unknown. Their death is only an assumption. Joel Tessa, a less prominent figure in politics then, is assumed to have met with the same fate, for he has not been heard of since the days of the Sikombela Declaration Dossier.

== Municipality ==
Zibagwe Rural District Council runs this centre. It is represented by a male (Ward 10) councillor on a Zanu-PF ticket. In council books Joel Business Center is named Zhombe and classified as a district service centre.

== Schools ==
- Rio Tinto Zhombe High School There are no primary schools at the center; pupils go to St Martin de Porres Primary School about 3 km southeast and some to Champeni about the same distance northwest.

== Transportation ==
Transport is solely by road, and there is a good road network linking Zhombe to the surrounding major towns Gweru, Kwekwe, Gokwe and Kadoma the main carriageway being the Kwekwe-Gokwe Highway.

== Communication ==
All the three major cellphone operators, namely Econet, Telecel Zimbabwe and NetOne, have base stations in the town.

== Other service delivery facilities ==
Various service delivery facilities serving the whole of Zhombe, including Council offices, District Development Fund Workshops, Zimbabwe National Water Authority workshops, Zhombe Police Station, The Grain Marketing Board, Registrar General Sub-Offices and Post Office, are located at the centre.
