= Growth point =

A growth point is a technical term in cognitive linguistics and gesture research. It refers to the earliest beginnings of a spoken utterance in the mind of a speaker, combining the beginnings of a mimetic gesture with the preliminary verbal expression of the person's thought.

The growth point is the speaker's minimal idea unit that can develop into a full utterance together with a gesture... the content of the growth point tends to be the novel departure of thought from the presupposed background. It is the element of thought that stands out in the context and may be the point of greatest relevance [...] The concept of the growth point unites image, word and pragmatic content into a single unit.

— McNeill, D.1992. Hand and Mind: What Gestures Reveal about Thought. Chicago and London: The University of Chicago Press, p. 220.
