= Ngondoma Irrigation Scheme =

Ngondoma Irrigation Scheme is located in Zhombe, Kwekwe District in Zimbabwe's Agro-Ecological Region Three. The average annual rainfall for the location is 550 mm. The scheme area is 44.4 4 hectares. Of the 179 farmers in the scheme, 134 are women. It comprises members from various villages, including villagers from Chief Njelele side, Gokwe District on the other side of Ngondoma River.

== Inception ==
The scheme was established in 1968, and only 12 to 20 farmers having plots measuring up to one hectare each were at the inauguration of the 33 ha. By 1988 the plot holders had increased to 69.

Samuel Mbewes' story in response to Mark Zvinokona's question how they acquired land under ngondoma irrigation scheme and why it is women dominated

Empress Nickel Mine closed down in 1983; it's women-dominated because most men do gold panning(makorokoza) over here and most women don't have alternative jobs to work other than farming in the Irrigation Scheme; we got the land through inheritance(minda yenhaka).The Land is passed on from one person to another,from one generation to the next one.My maternal grandmother(mother's mother) was allocated land in the Irrigation Scheme in 1978 during the time when white farmers where allocating land to black communal farmers and they were packing up and leaving the Irrigation Scheme and after she died in 2006,my mother and her brother(my uncle) inherited her land.That's how my mother got the land in the Irrigation Scheme

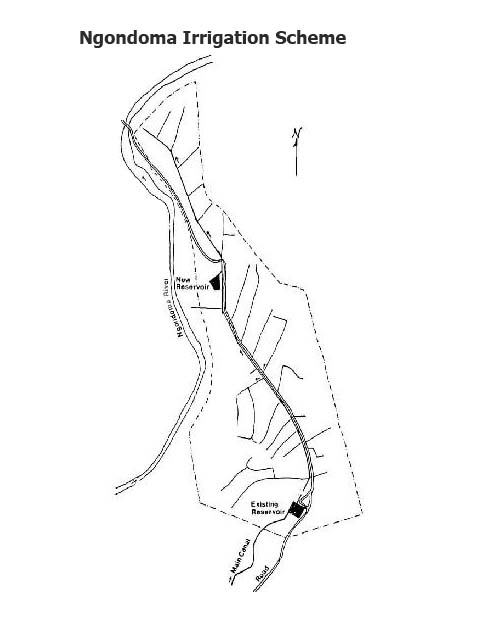
Ngondoma Irrigation Scheme sketch

== Extension ==
The scheme has since been extended up to 44.4 hectares (110 acres). Nowadays the plot holders have increased to 179 and 134 of them are women. Each farmer holds at least 0.2 hectares (0.49 acres) of land in the scheme.

- There is another extension of the scheme at a different location altogether called 'Ngondoma Irrigation Scheme Extension'.
- 'Ngondoma Irrigation Scheme Extension' is 2 kilometres (1.2 mi) upstream just a kilometre shot of the Kadoma-Gokwe Road. The hectarage is about 6.8 hectares (17 acres) fully utilised. The extension is known as Mushonga irrigation though not its official name.

Mushonga irrigation is supplied by the same literal canal that supplies the main irrigation scheme. It has no night storage.

== Water source ==
Ngondoma Irrigation Scheme draws water from Ngondoma Dam, which has an estimated capacity of 7.5 million cubic metres. It is the 40th of the 41 recorded by FAO as Major Dams in Zimbabwe.

Ngongoma Irrigation Scheme has a gravity fed surface irrigation system. A canal conveys water from the dam into a reservoir which is situated just at the edge of the irrigation scheme. From the reservoir another canal conveys water to various portions of the irrigation and from a lateral to fields farmers fetch water using siphons. Another night storage has been built about 1500m to the northend of the scheme to service plots further afield.

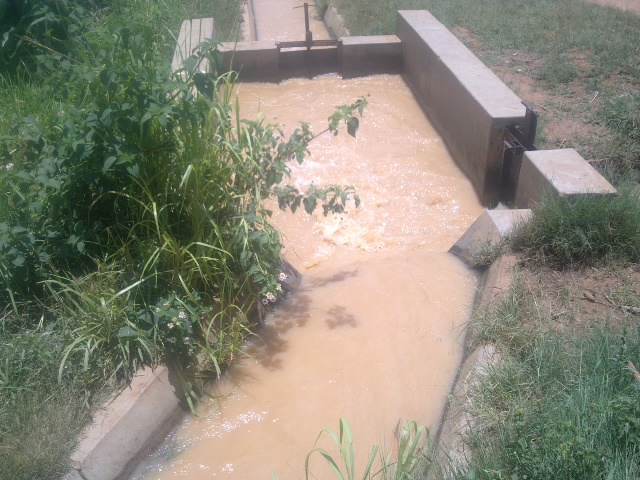
Ngondoma Irrigation Main Leteral Canal Feb 1, 2016

Ngondoma Dam was constructed in 1967 mainly to supply Empress Nickel Mine which also was established in 1968 the year Ngondoma Irrigation was established.

Empress Mine closed down in 1985.

The dam provides drinking water for both livestock and human beings.

Today the dam supports, apart from the irrigation scheme, Empress Mine Growth Point, Columbina Rural Service Center, Villages this Zhombe side of the dam and the Gokwe side of it.

Villagers use the dam water for watering their gardens, livestock watering, brick moulding and other domestic purposes.

Ngondoma Dam

Latitude: S 18° 27' 26"

Longitude: E 29° 24' 50"

Ngondoma Dam is surrounded by a rich flora as on record of the Flora of Zimbabwe.

Empress Mine Township which starts immediately to the east of the dam has inviting beauty in flora such as the Acacia amythethophylla, Colophospermum mopane, Euphorbia hirta, Jacaranda mimosifolia, Albizia harveyi, Lantana camara, Senna singueana, Typha capensis and Bauhinia macrantha just to name a few from the 112 records list compiled by Tessa Ball on November 9, 1996.

== External beneficiaries ==
About 80% of the water released from the dam reaches the irrigation's night storage. The other 20% is shared among animals and people upstream.

People at Columbina Rural Service Center also fetch water for building, washing and other uses from the canal that transports water to Ngondoma Irrigation Scheme.

== Soil texture ==
Soils are predominantly reddish-brown and rough pH ranges of 6.0-6.8 throughout the whole scheme.

== Agriculture, mechanisation and irrigation development ==
Ngondoma was one of the eight irrigation schemes that benefitted from the farm equipment sourced by the government from Brazil.

It received Tractors, ploughs, rome discs, fertiliser spreaders and planters. Most farmers no longer use animal drawn ploughs on their plots because tractors are efficient, fast and cheaper.

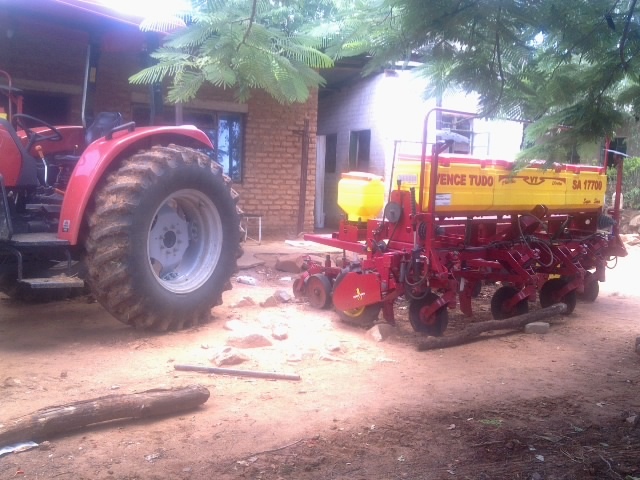
Ngondoma Irrigation Scheme Workshop

== Management ==
Ngondoma Irrigation Scheme is one of the successful farmer managed schemes in Zimbabwe. The scheme is fully farmer managed, through the democratically elected Irrigation Scheme Management Committee which has to be in office for two years before yet another election. The committee is supported by AGRITEX workers. An Extension Worker who is a government employed graduate in Agricultural Science and Practice provides technical advice to both the Irrigation Scheme Management Committee and the farmers.

== Usual crops ==
Main crops are vegetables, okra, beans and maize. Tomatoes are not grown by many farmers unless they are contracted by a reliable company.

=== Marketing ===
Green maize buyers come from places such as Columbina Rural Service Center, Empress Mine Township and even as far as Kadoma, Kwekwe, Gweru and Harare. Buyers provide their own transport. Okra buyers are usually from among the farmers themselves. The buy from other farmers at producer price and ferry tonnes of okra to Bulawayo where they wholesale it to market stall holders at Rankini. Beans, butternuts, cucumbers, green paper, vegetables and other crops have cash markets from the local community and the surrounding towns.

Sometimes farmers are contracted to produce tomatoes in bulk.

== Comments ==
Ngondoma Irrigation Scheme is highly productive and profitable because of good soils, adequate water supply throughout the year, and good management. It is also one of the cheapest run irrigation schemes for the government because water supply is almost free throughout the year because the canal uses no electricity or fuel, unlike its sister scheme Senkwasi Irrigation Scheme 17 km South, whose services are regularly interrupted by ZESA electric power load shedding. The largest irrigation scheme in Zhombe Communal Land; Exchange Irrigation Scheme like Senkwasi uses electricity to drive water pumps.

== Nearby places ==
- Exchange Irrigation Scheme
- Empress-Machipisa Shopping Center
- Commoner Stadium
- Empress Mine
- BEE MINE Primary School
- Ngondoma Dam
- Mabura Caves
