= Sidakeni =

Coordinates: 18.4475°S 29.4775°E

Sidakeni Ward is ward number 7 of the 33 wards in Zibagwe Rural District Council of Kwekwe District. It is in Zhombe Communinal Land in Midlands Province of Zimbabwe. It is 92 km north-west-north of Kwekwe and 64 km south-west of Kadoma.

== Municipality ==
The Zibagwe Rural District Council runs the ward and at present the ward is represented by a male councillor, on a ZANU-PF ticket.

== Shopping Centers ==
- Sidakeni Township
- Mangwarangwara Township (kwaChiroro)
- St Peter's Munyati Township (kwaHove)
- Kasawe Township (Kasawi).

== Schools ==
=== Primary ===
- Sidakeni Primary School established 1966
- Kasawe Primary School established 1965
- Mangwarangwara Primary School established 1965
- St Peters Munyati Primary School established 1963.

=== Secondary ===
- Sidakeni Secondary School established 1981
- Kasawe Secondary School established 2008.

== Health Center ==
Sidakeni Clinic is the only health center in Sidakeni Ward. It is staffed by 2 qualified nurse and 2 nurse aides, and it has 2 general beds. It is owned by Zivagwe Rural District Council.

== Animal Health Center ==
There is an animal health care center here that serves wards 6, 7 and 8.

== Alumni ==
- Somandla Ndebele was born and bred in Sidakeni Village, and he also was educated at Sidakeni Secondary School.
