= Kwekwe District =

District in Zimbabwe

Kwekwe Que Que
- District
- Kwekwe District within Zimbabwe
- Interactive map of Kwekwe
- Country: Zimbabwe
- District: Kwekwe

Population (2022 census)
  - Total: 316,925

Kwekwe, originally known as Que Que, is a district in Zimbabwe. 197,062 people live in Kwekwe rural and 119,863 live in Kwekwe town (2022 census).

== Location ==
It is found in the Midlands Province, in the central Zimbabwe. Kwekwe, with an estimated population of about 120,000 in 2022, is the capital city of the district. The district capital is located approximately 220 kilometres (140 mi), by road, southwest of Harare, the capital of Zimbabwe and the largest city in that country. Kwekwe lies on the main road, Highway A-5, between Harare and Bulawayo, Zimbabwe's second-largest city, located approximately 230 kilometres (140 mi), further southwest of Kwekwe. The coordinates of Kwekwe District are:19° 0' 0.00"S, 29° 45' 0.00"E (Latitude:19.0000; Longitude:29.7500).

== Governance ==
Kwekwe District has two urban subdivisions Kwekwe Municipality (Kwekwe City Council) and Redcliff Municipality (Redcliff Town Council). The third subdivision is the caretaker of the rural part of Kwekwe District, Zibagwe Rural District Council usually called Kwekwe Rural District Council.

There are 60 rural district councils from Zimbabwe's 8 non-metropolitan provinces. Midlands Province has 8 Rural District Councils:

- Gokwe North RDC in Gokwe North District
- Gokwe South RDC in Gokwe South District
- Mberengwa RDC in Mberengwa District
- Runde RDC in Zvishavane District
- Takawira RDC in Chirumhanzu District
- Tongogara RDC in Shurugwi District
- Vungu RDC in Gweru District
- Zibagwe RDC in Kwekwe District

The District Administrator (DA) is the chief senior civil servant overseeing the administration of the district. He is an ex-officio in both the urban and rural councils and he exerts considerable power in both.

There are 5 constituencies wholly in Kwekwe District, Redcliff, Mbizo, Kwekwe Central, Silobela and Zhombe. The sixth constituency Churumanzu-Zibagwe has only three wards in Kwekwe District while the rest are in Churumanzu District.

Among these only Kwekwe Central and Redcliff fall under urban councils while the rest fall under the Rural District Council. However some parts of Redcliff Constituency are rural.

Kwekwe District Urban covers the city of Kwekwe run by Kwekwe Municipality (Kwekwe City Council) and Redcliff run by Redcliff Town Council, both councils existent according to Chapter 29.15 of the Urban Councils Act.

Kwekwe Rural is that part of the district that does not fall under the jurisdiction of Redcliff Town Council and Kwekwe City Council. This part is run by a Rural District Council, the rural equivalent of an urban council formed by the Local Government according to Chapter 29.13 of the Rural District Councils Act.

The rural part of Kwekwe District is governed by Zibagwe Rural District Council.

Kwekwe, then spelt Que Que, was called Sebakwe before the assumption of the name Que Que hence Zibagwe Rural for Kwekwe Rural.

Kwekwe District has a total of 67 wards:

- 15 Kwekwe municipal wards,
- 9 Redcliff municipal wards
- 33 rural district council wards.

Kwekwe Municipality has 15 wards;

- 9 in Kwekwe Central Constituency
- 6 in Mbizo Constituency.

Redcliff Municipality has 9 wards yet Redcliff Constituency has 13 wards;

- 9 municipal wards
- 4 rural wards. These 4 wards are under Zibagwe Rural District Council.

Zibagwe RDC has a total of 33 wards;

- 4 under Redcliff Constituency,
- 11 under Zhombe Constituency,
- 14 under Silobela Constituency
- 4 under Churumanzu-Zibagwe Constituency.

== Kwekwe Urban ==
Kwekwe Urban District is administered by two urban councils established in terms of the Zimbabwe Urban Councils Act, Chapter 29.15

=== Kwekwe Municipality ===
Kwekwe Municipality has jurisdiction over 14 wards in Kwekwe Central Constituency and Mbizo Constituency.

Kwekwe City Council 2013 - 2018 Source: Zimbabwe Electoral Commission

| Ward | Councillor | Gender | IParty | Remarks |
|---|---|---|---|---|
| 01 | Ndlovu Mbekezile | M | MDC-T | |
| 02 | Titora Future | F | MDC-T | |
| 03 | Masiya Weston | M | MDC-T | |
| 04 | Ticharunga Janet | F | MDC-T | |
| 05 | Sithole Aaron Panganayi | M | MDC-T | |
| 06 | Nyamucherera Maclean | M | ZANU-PF | |
| 07 | Madzoke Matenda Titos | M | ZANU-PF | Mayor |
| 08 | Mapurazi John | M | ZANU-PF | |
| 09 | Lawe Kanduro | M | ZANU-PF | |
| 10 | Gwalazimba Aaron M. | M | MDC-T | |
| 11 | Mupereri Vongaishe | M | ZANU-PF | |
| 12 | Chinwanda Morris | M | MDC-T | |
| 13 | Mupunini Edzai | F | ZANU-PF | |
| 14 | Chaduka Sairos | M | ZANU-PF | |

Kwekwe mayor is Clr. Matenda Madzoke

2008 - 2013 Council All councillors in this term were from MDC-T. Source: Kubatana Aechive

| Ward | Councillor | Gender | IParty | Remarks |
|---|---|---|---|---|
| 01 | Ndlovu Mbekezeli | m | MDCZ | |
| 02 | Nziramasanga Thomas Mugano | m | MDCZ | |
| 03 | Masiya Weston | m | MDCZ | |
| 04 | Mkosana Helena | f | MDCZ | |
| 05 | Sithole Aaron Panganayi | m | MDCZ | |
| 06 | Mavengere William | m | MDCZ | |
| 07 | Marongwe Admore | m | MDCZ | |
| 08 | Tobaiwa Shadreck | m | MDCZ | Mayor |
| 09 | Mutirwara Shirley | f | MDCZ | |
| 10 | Gwalazimba Aaron Michael | m | MDCZ | |
| 11 | Ngozoh Johan | m | MDCZ | |
| 12 | Machiungata Thomas | m | MDCZ | |
| 13 | Chitopo Queenley | f | MDCZ | |
| 14 | Chanza Amanda Sibusi | f | MDCZ | |

The mayor for this term is Clr. Shadreck Tobaiwa

=== Redcliff Municipality ===
2013 - 2018 Town Council All councillors are from Redcliff Constituency. Source: Zimbabwe Electoral Commission

| Ward | Councillor | Gender | IParty | Remarks |
|---|---|---|---|---|
| 01 | Muchuweni Aston | M | MDC-T | |
| 02 | Duro Euphrasia | F | MDC-T | |
| 03 | Masiyatsva Clyton S | M | MDC-T | |
| 04 | Masiiwa Shangwa Vincent | M | MDC-T | |
| 05 | Majaji Onward | M | MDC-T | |
| 06 | Foroma Chamunorwa | M | ZANU-PF | |
| 07 | Borerwe Lovemore | M | MDC-T | |
| 08 | Chikwiri Takura | M | MDC-T | |
| 09 | Kapuya Freddy | M | ZANU-PF | |

== 2008 - 2013 Council ==
Source: Kubatana Aechive

| Ward | Councillor | Gender | IParty | Constituency |
|---|---|---|---|---|
| 01 | Nzveda Gwatirisa | m | MDC-T | |
| 02 | Muchingami Elizabeth | f | MDC-T | |
| 03 | Masiyatsva Clyton Sundirai | m | MDC-T | |
| 04 | Shoko Martin | m | MDC-T | |
| 05 | Ncube Winnie | f | MDC-T | |
| 06 | Hwarara Edias | m | MDC-T | |
| 07 | Mlambo Fanyana Lawrence | m | MDC-T | |
| 08 | Matehwa Joseph | m | MDC-T | |
| 09 | Nyoni David | m | MDC-T | |

== Overview ==
The district is rich in minerals including gold and iron ore. The largest steel manufacturing factory, Zimbabwe Iron and Steel Company (ZISCO), is located in the district in the town of Redcliff, near the city of Kwekwe, the district capital. The district contains many large and small mines and several large steel mills.

The district is located in Zimbabwe's Highveld at an altitude of about 1,220 metres (4,000 ft), above sea level. It is located in the tropics but its high altitude modifies this to a warm temperate climate. The average annual temperature is 19 °C (66 °F). As with much of the Highveld, summers are long but not hot as the temperature depends on the amount of cloudiness and indirectly the amount of rain received. Drought years are hotter than wet years. The climate is hot and wet during the summer rainy season from mid November to mid March, with cool, dry weather from May to mid-August in the winter season, and warm dry weather from August to mid November. Winters are characterised mainly by their cold nights, with an average minimum temperature of 7 °C (45 °F), and are the sunniest time of the year.

== Population ==
The population census of 1992 estimated the population of the district at 249,705. In 2004, the district population was estimated at 289,039 people. The next national population census in Zimbabwe is scheduled from 18 August 2012 through 28 August 2012.

== See also ==
- Districts of Zimbabwe
- Provinces of Zimbabwe
