= Tongogara Rural District Council =

Coordinates: 19.6680°S 30.0000°E

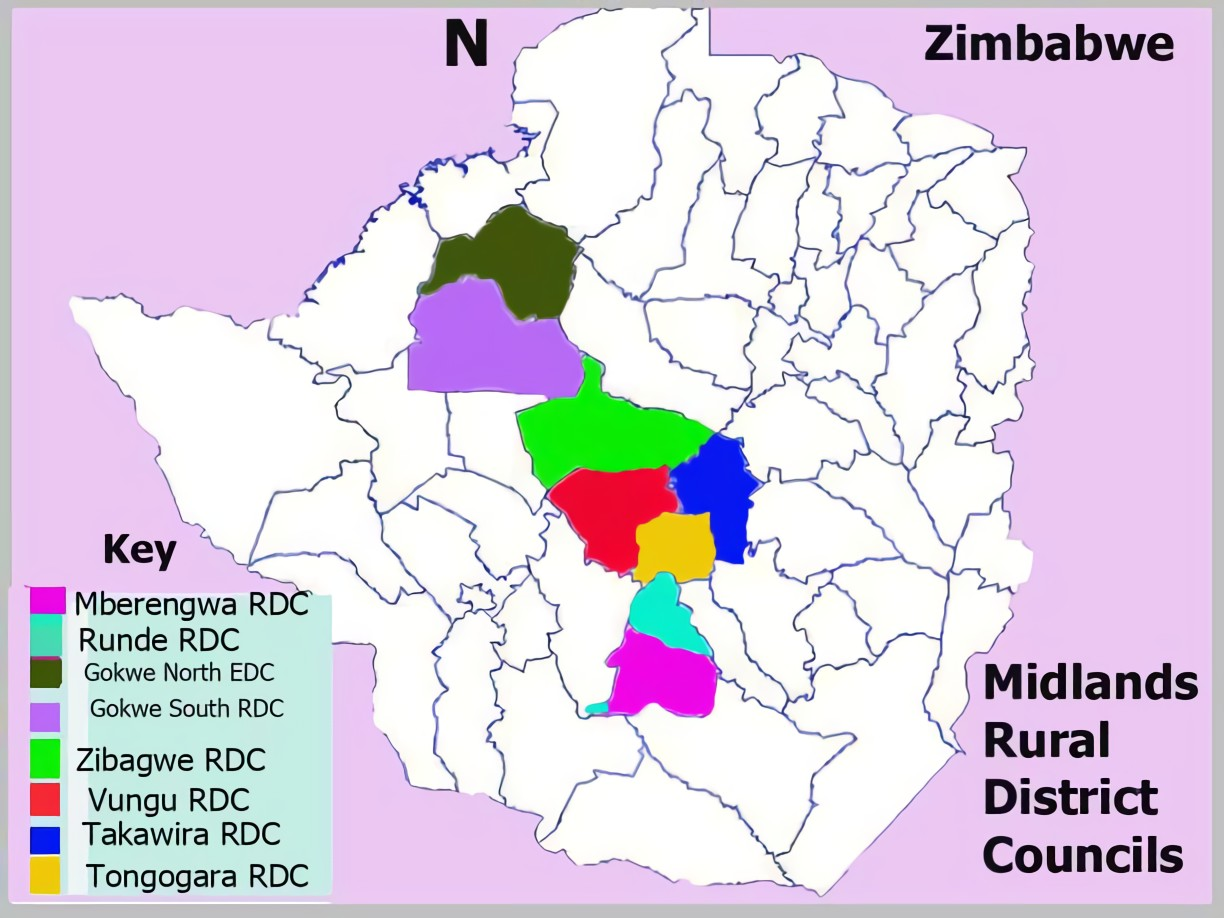
Midlands RDCs

Tongogara Rural District Council is a local government organ administering Shurugwi District Rural District. There are two local government arms, Shurugwi Town Council created under the Zimbabwe Urban Councils Act, Chapter 29.15 administering Shurugwi, and Tongogara RDC created in terms of the Zimbabwe Rural District Councils Act, Chapter 29.13 overseeing the rural Shurugwi South District

== Background ==
Tongogara Rural District Council is the official name of Shurugwi Rural District Council. It is one of the eight rural district councils in the Midlands Province. The other seven are;

- Mberengwa RDC in Mberengwa District,
- Runde RDC in Zvishavane District,
- Takawira RDC in Chirumhanzu District,
- Vungu RDC in Gweru District
- Zibagwe RDC in Kwekwe District
- Gokwe South RDC in Gokwe South District
- Gokwe North RDC in Gokwe North District

== Wards Distribution ==
Tongogara RDC covers two constituencies with a total of 24 wards.

- Shurugwi-North Constituency has 9 wards; 1, 12, 13, 14, 15, 16, 17, 18 and 19.
- Shurugwi-South Constituency has 15 wards; 2, 3, 4, 5, 6, 7, 8, 9, 10, 11, 20, 21, 22, 23 and 24.

== 2013 - 2018 Councillors ==
Source: Zimbabwe Electoral Commission

Ward	Councillor	Gender	Party	Constituency
#01	Kufaruwenga G Chivi	f	ZANU-PF	Shurugwi-North
#02	Ruvarashe Taruvinga	f	ZANU-PF	Shurugwi-South
#03	Tamiswa T Njovana	m	ZANU-PF	Shurugwi-South
#04	Emelia Chinyama	f	ZANU-PF	Shurugwi-South
#05	Jenipha Shumba	f	ZANU-PF	Shurugwi-South
#06	Edward Chitera	m	ZANU-PF	Shurugwi-South
#07	Kenneth B Pfebeni	m	ZANU-PF	Shurugwi-South
#08	Crispen Muranda	m	ZANU-PF	Shurugwi-South
#09	Buru R Simba	m	ZANU-PF	Shurugwi-South
#10	Tapiwa Ndawana	m	ZANU-PF	Shurugwi-South
#11	Sheperd Mudhara	m	ZANU-PF	Shurugwi-South
#12	Metheus M Banda	m	ZANU-PF	Shurugwi-North
#13	Shilla Midzi	f	ZANU-PF	Shurugwi-North
#14	Gladys Nhema	f	ZANU-PF	Shurugwi-North
#15	Donald Mashipe	m	ZANU-PF	Shurugwi-North
#16	Danisa Mujere	f	ZANU-PF	Shurugwi-North
#17	Elias Mpupuni	m	ZANU-PF	Shurugwi-North
#18	Golden Kapeta	m	ZANU-PF	Shurugwi-North
#19	Lettinah Nyoni	m	ZANU-PF	Shurugwi-North
#20	Happyson Muteliso	m	ZANU-PF	Shurugwi-South
#21	Simon Kamurayi	m	ZANU-PF	Shurugwi-South
#22	Kalebe Mupupuni	m	ZANU-PF	Shurugwi-South
#23	Patricia Dibula	f	ZANU-PF	Shurugwi-South
#24	Norman Sibindi	m	ZANU-PF	Shurugwi-South

== 2008 - 2013 Councilors ==
Source: Kubatana Archive

Ward	Councillor	Gender	Party	Constituency
#04	Nhika Katazo	m	MDC-T	Shurugwi-South
#08	Muranda Crispen	m	ZANU-PF	Shurugwi-South
#09	Kwangwari Dispise	m	ZANU-PF	Shurugwi-South
#10	Ndawana Tapiwa	m	ZANU-PF	Shurugwi-South
#11	Mudhara Gift	m	MDC-T	Shurugwi-South
#18	Mativenga Tambudzai	f	ZANU-PF	Shurugwi-North
#22	Mukandapi Lawrence	m	MDC-T	Shurugwi-South
#24	Mdehwa Rabson Seletso	m	MDC-T	Shurugwi-South

== See also ==
- Shurugwi District
- Gweru District
- Kwekwe District
