= Gokwe North Rural District Council =

Coordinates: 17.5500°S 28.8667°E

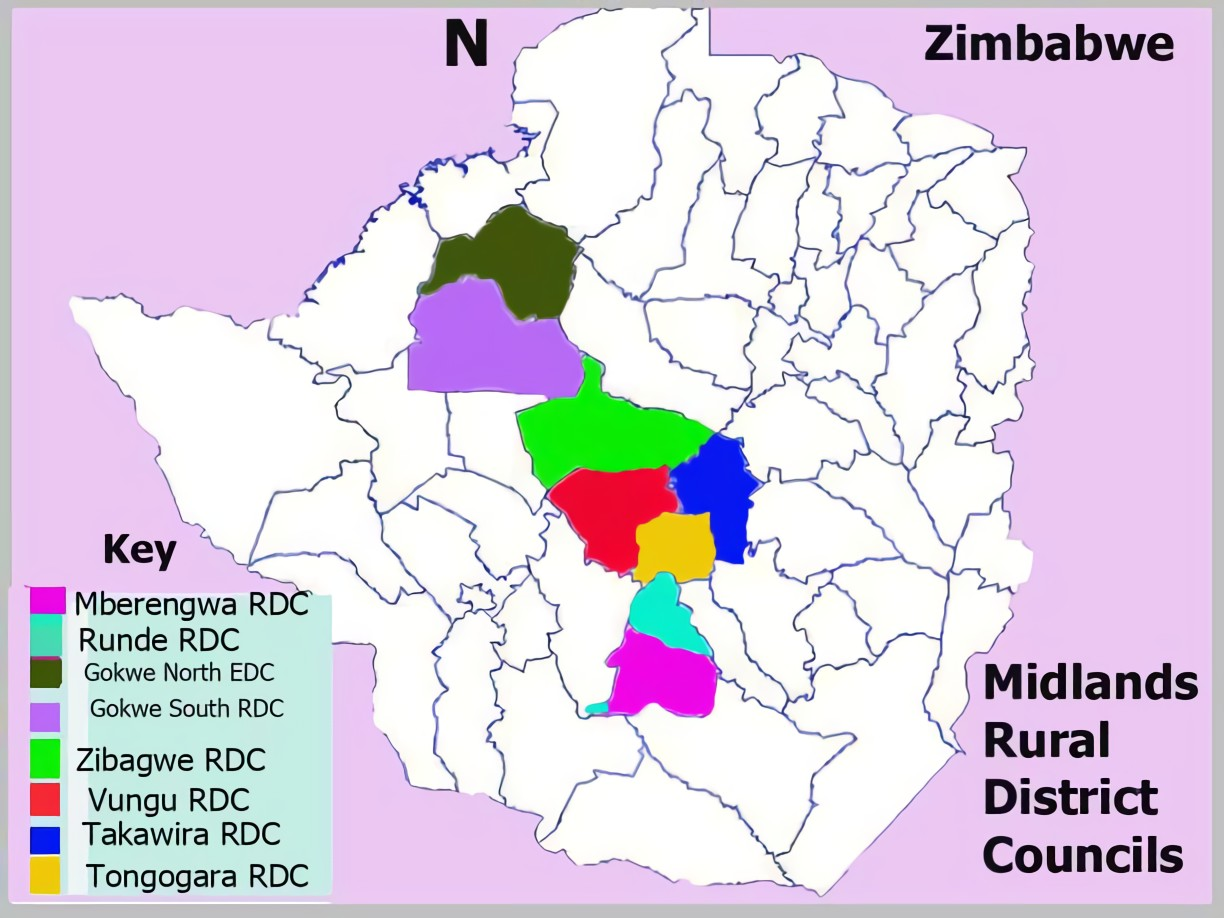
Midlands RDCs

Gokwe North Rural District Councils is a local government organ administering Gokwe North District. There are eight Rural District Councils in the Midlands Province of Zimbabwe all established in terms of the Zimbabwe Rural District Councils Act; Chapter 29.13.

== Background ==
Gokwe North RDC is one of the 8 rural district councils in Midlands Province namely

Mberengwa RDC in Mberengwa District, Runde RDC in Zvishavane District, Tongogara RDC in Shurugwi District, Vungu RDC in Gweru District, Takawira RDC in Chirumhanzu District, Zibagwe RDC in Kwekwe District, Gokwe South RDC in Gokwe South District and here in Gokwe North District is this rural district council.

Gokwe North District is the furthest north of the province. Unlike its neighbour Gokwe South District which has and urban settlement within it, this district is all rural. Its capital is Mutora District Service Center where Gokwe North RDC operates from.. There are 36 wards under Gokwe North RDC evenly distributed in 4 constituencies; Gokwe-Chireya 9, Gokwe-Gumunyu, Gokwe-Kabuyuni 9 and Gokwe-Nembudziya 9. .

== 2013 - 2018 Councillors ==
Source: Zimbabwe Electoral Commission

| Ward | Councillor | Gender | Party | Constituency |
|---|---|---|---|---|
| #01 | Shu-shine Siyamandanda | m | MDC-T | Kabuyuni |
| #02 | Susan Chavani | f | ZANU-PF | Kabuyuni |
| #03 | Alfredy Nyamusasa | m | ZANU-PF | Kabuyuni |
| #04 | Faith Marongwe | f | ZANU-PF | Chireya |
| #05 | Saimon Mucheza | m | ZANU-PF | Kabuyuni |
| #06 | Chandivinga Mudimu | m | ZANU-PF | Gumunyu |
| #07 | Marble Muzite | f | ZANU-PF | Chireya |
| #08 | Member Mapiringanwa | m | ZANU-PF | Chireya |
| #09 | Jeremiah Ndhlukulani | m | ZANU-PF | Chireya |
| #10 | Marashe Masirasi | m | ZANU-PF | Chireya |
| #11 | Tadzimwa R Gono | m | ZANU-PF | Nembudziya |
| #12 | Godfrey Mahaso | m | ZANU-PF | Nembudziya |
| #13 | Renias Madende | m | ZANU-PF | Nembudziya |
| #14 | Stuwart Mbulawa | m | ZANU-PF | Chireya |
| #15 | Munamato Majasi | m | ZANU-PF | Nembudziya |
| #16 | Abel Misi | m | ZANU-PF | Gumunyu |
| #17 | Given Mapfumo | m | ZANU-PF | Gumunyu |
| #18 | Martin Zimbeva | m | ZANU-PF | Gumunyu |
| #19 | Lawrence Mazhawidza | m | ZANU-PF | Gumunyu |
| #20 | Munashe Nhamo | m | ZANU-PF | Gumunyu |
| #21 | Govanai Marongwe | m | ZANU-PF | Gumunyu |
| #22 | Simon Ndawi | m | ZANU-PF | Gumunyu |
| #23 | Stephen Chakabveyo | m | ZANU-PF | Nembudziya |
| #24 | Walter W Wafana | m | ZANU-PF | Nembudziya |
| #25 | Luckson Chowara | m | ZANU-PF | Nembudziya |
| #26 | Jimmy Buruwuru | m | ZANU-PF | Nembudziya |
| #27 | Fadzai Ntabeni | m | ZANU-PF | Kabuyuni |
| #28 | Edmore Mateva | m | ZANU-PF | Kabuyuni |
| #29 | Moses Musvaba | m | MDC-T | Kabuyuni |
| #30 | Patrick Ndlovu | m | ZANU-PF | Kabuyuni |
| #31 | Mazhambe Sibanda | m | MDC-T | Kabuyuni |
| #32 | Sinikiwe Mashingaidze | f | ZANU-PF | Gumunyu |
| #33 | Siphiwe Kadoma | f | ZANU-PF | Chireya |
| #34 | Tapera Chikwanda | m | ZANU-PF | Chireya |
| #35 | Edina Mandiya | m | ZANU-PF | Chireya |
| #36 | Charles Mapishu | m | ZANU-PF | Nembudziya |

== 2008 - 2013 Councillors ==
Source: Kubatana Aechive

| Ward | Councillor | Gender | Party | Constituency |
|---|---|---|---|---|
| #01 | Siyamandanda Shushine | m | MDC-T | Kabuyuni |
| #02 | Magonyo Collin | m | MDC-T | Kabuyuni |
| #03 | Nyamusasa Alfred | m | ZANU-PF | Kabuyuni |
| #04 | Mbano Onward | m | ZANU-PF | Chireya |
| #05 | Gwanzura Maxwell | m | ZANU-PF | Kabuyuni |
| #06 | Mudimu Chandivinga | m | ZANU-PF | Gumunyu |
| #07 | Muzite Marbel | f | ZANU-PF | Chireya |
| #08 | Mapiringanwa Member | m | ZANU-PF | Chireya |
| #09 | Ndhlukulani Jeremiah | m | ZANU-PF | Chireya |
| #10 | Maradze Masirasi | m | ZANU-PF | Chireya |
| #11 | Gono Tadzimwa Rayforce | m | ZANU-PF | Nembudziya |
| #12 | Moyo Mary | f | ZANU-PF | Nembudziya |
| #13 | Mudzori Tinos | m | MDC-T | Nembudziya |
| #14 | Mbulawa Steward | m | ZANU-PF | Chireya |
| #15 | Tapota Venancio | m | MDC-T | Nembudziya |
| #16 | Chidemeri John | f | MDC-T | Gumunyu |
| #17 | - | - | - | Gumunyu |
| #18 | Makumbe George | m | ZANU-PF | Gumunyu |
| #19 | Tsvakirayi Davidson | m | MDC-T | Gumunyu |
| #20 | Tiengane Loveness | f | ZANU-PF | Gumunyu |
| #21 | Marongwe Govanai | m | ZANU-PF | Gumunyu |
| #22 | Chemhere Gladys | f | ZANU-PF | Gumunyu |
| #23 | Chakabveyo Stephen | m | ZANU-PF | Nembudziya |
| #24 | Torera Garikayi | m | MDC-T | Nembudziya |
| #25 | Matikiti Tarisai | - | ZANU-PF | Nembudziya |
| #26 | Buruwuru Jimmy | m | ZANU-PF | Nembudziya |
| #27 | Ntabeni Fadzai | f | ZANU-PF | Kabuyuni |
| #28 | Chipungari Isabel Ruramai | f | ZANU-PF | Kabuyuni |
| #29 | Kuzasi Mabena | - | MDC-T | Kabuyuni |
| #30 | Siambelebele Faison | m | ZANU-PF | Kabuyuni |
| #31 | Sibanda Mazhambe | m | MDC-T | Kabuyuni |
| #32 | - | - | - | Gumunyu |
| #33 | Kadoma Siphiwe | f | ZANU-PF | Chireya |
| #34 | Chakwanda Tapera | m | ZANU-PF | Chireya |
| #35 | Mandiya Edna | f | ZANU-PF | Chireya |
| #36 | Mapeshu Charles | m | ZANU-PF | Nembudziya |

== See also ==
- Gokwe North District
- Gokwe South RDC
