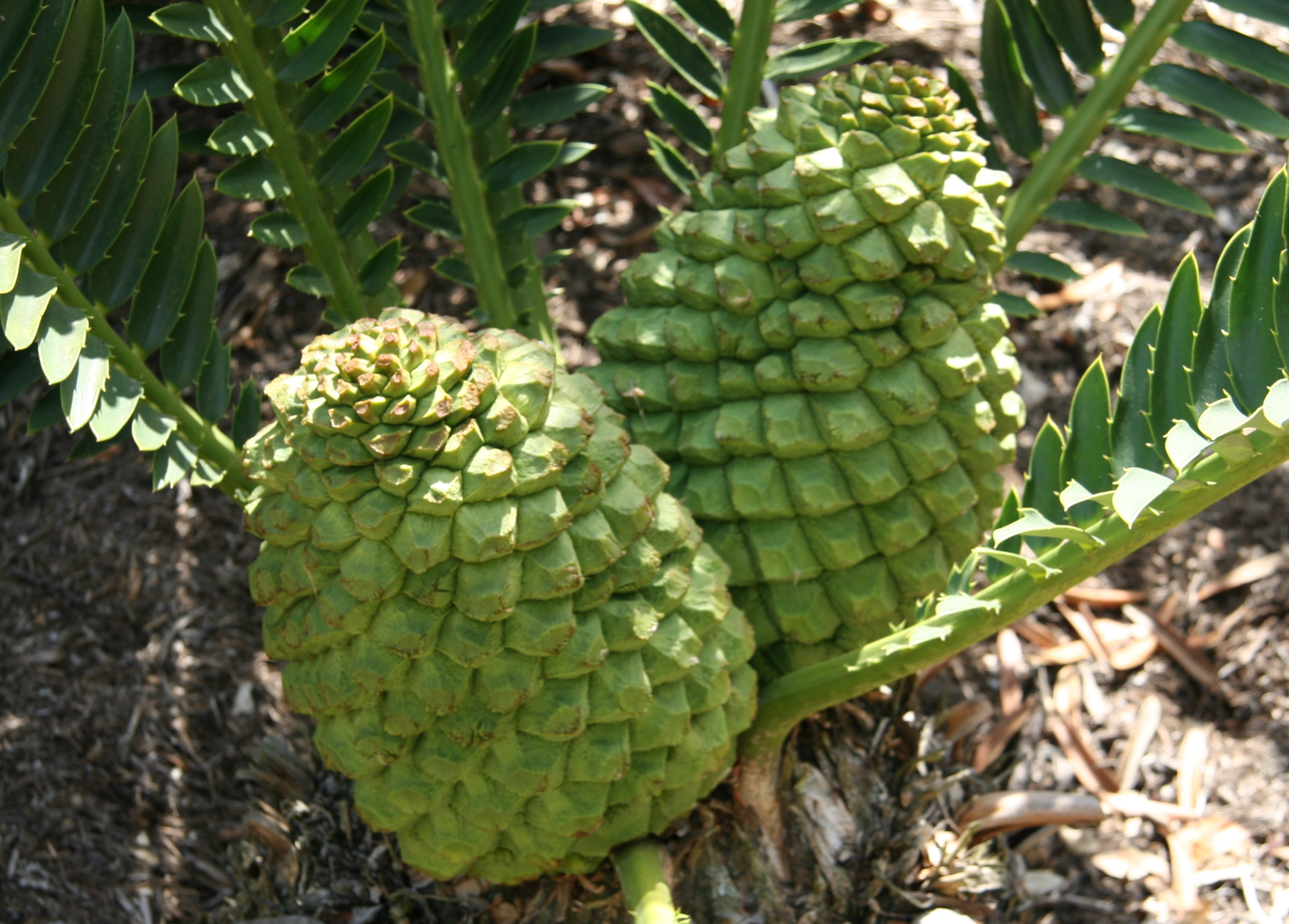

Conservation status
- Endangered (IUCN 3.1)
- CITES Appendix I

Scientific classification
- Kingdom: Plantae
- Clade: Embryophytes
- Clade: Tracheophytes
- Clade: Spermatophytes
- Clade: Gymnospermae
- Division: Cycadophyta
- Class: Cycadopsida
- Order: Cycadales
- Family: Zamiaceae
- Genus: Encephalartos
- Species: E. concinnus

Binomial name
- Encephalartos concinnus R.A. Dyer & Verdoorn 1969

= Encephalartos concinnus =

Species of cycad

Encephalartos concinnus, or the Runde cycad, is a species of cycad in the family Zamiaceae that is endemic to Zimbabwe.

== Description ==
It's a tree-like plant, growing up to 2.5–3 m tall with a 35–45 cm wide stem covered in soft hairs. Its leaves are arranged in a cluster at the top, reaching 150–200 cm in length with about 50 pairs of thin leaflets, each with small spines on the edges and positioned at a 45-80° angle from the stem.

This plant is dioecious, meaning it has separate male and female cones. The male cones are green, 30–50 cm long and 7–10 cm wide, while the female cones are green, 35–45 cm long, 15–20 cm wide, and oval-shaped. The seeds are oblong, measuring 30–35 mm in length and 8–23 mm in width, covered in a brown sarcotesta.

== Range ==
This species grows in steep, rocky, misty valleys and woodlands. There are three known subpopulations, though one has possibly been extirpated by collectors. The plant is threatened by overcollection.

There are three subpopulations found in:

- Gwanda, Matabeleland South
- Mberengwa, Midlands
- Runde, Masvingo
