= COZ =

COZ may refer to

- COZ is the ICAO airline designator for Cosmic Air, Nepal
- COZ is the IATA airport code for Constanza Airport, Dominican Republic
