= Sandawana mines =

Mine in Midlands, Zimbabwe

Sandawana Mines
- Location within Zimbabwe
- Location: Midlands, Zimbabwe; 20°55′0″S 29°55′59″E
- Products: emeralds, lithium
- Opened: 1958
- Company: Rio Tinto Zinc 1958–1993; Sandawana Mines Ltd. 1993–2019; Kuvimba Mining House 2019–

The Sandawana Mines are a mining complex in Mberengwa District, Midlands Province of Zimbabwe, primarily known for its emeralds. The mines are sixty-five kilometers south of the town of Mberengwa.

With the growth in the use of lithium batteries, lithium became a major product from the Sandawana mines.

== History ==
Emeralds were first discovered there in 1956, at what is now the Vulcan mine site, and the following year at the Zeus mine site. Production began in 1958, and in 1959 the properties were sold to a Rio Tinto subsidiary Rio Tinto Zinc (RTZ). The mines were first worked by filling a wheelbarrow with the gem containing soil and then washing away the earth, but were replaced by modern placer techniques.

In 1993 Rio Tinto sold the mines to a newly formed company, Sandawana Mines (Pvt.) Ltd., where the Zimbabwean government held a significant share. The mines were closed seven years later due to the drop in demand for emeralds. But interest in the properties resumed as the price of lithium soared. In 2019, Kuvimba Mining House (KMH), which is 65% owned by the Zimbabwe government, took over the asset.

Illegal mining takes place at the Sandawana mines due to lax or bribed security. The global rise in lithium prices in the early 2020s triggered a lithium rush which caused conflicts, leading to the eviction of local people from lithium-rich lands. In Sandawana, the evictions – which were filmed and did the rounds of social media – triggered widespread condemnation of the government.

== Geology ==
The Mweza greenstone belt consists of a series of intensely deformed and moderately metamorphosed ultramafic-to-mafic volcanic rocks and metamorphosed sedimentary rocks. Intruded into the greenstone are granitic pegmatites containing rare earth minerals such as spodumene. These pegmatite were intruded just prior to and/or during a main deformation event at 2.6 Ga.(2.6 billion years ago). Subsequently, along the cracks between the pegmatites and the greenstone, a hydrothermal solution complex was injected containing large amounts of sodium, as well as lithium, fluorine, beryllium, phosphorus and chromium. This solution reacted with the minerals of both the granite pegmatite and the greenstone to produce a variety of uncommon minerals, including emeralds (beryl).
