= Zvishavane District =

Coordinates: 20.31°S 30.05°E

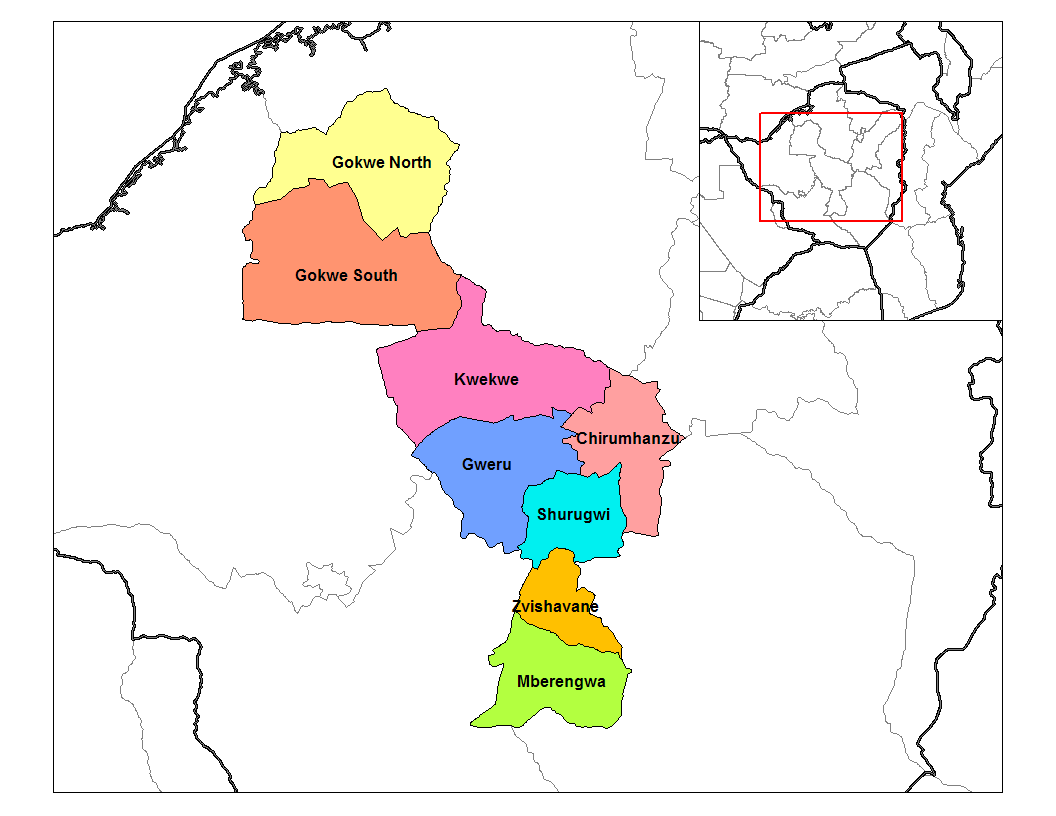
Midlands Districts

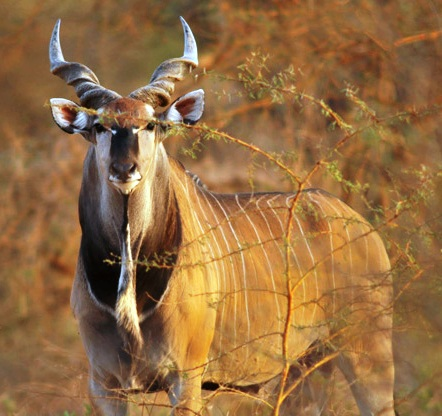
Shava means Eland in ChiShona. The eland colour is called shava in ChiShona.

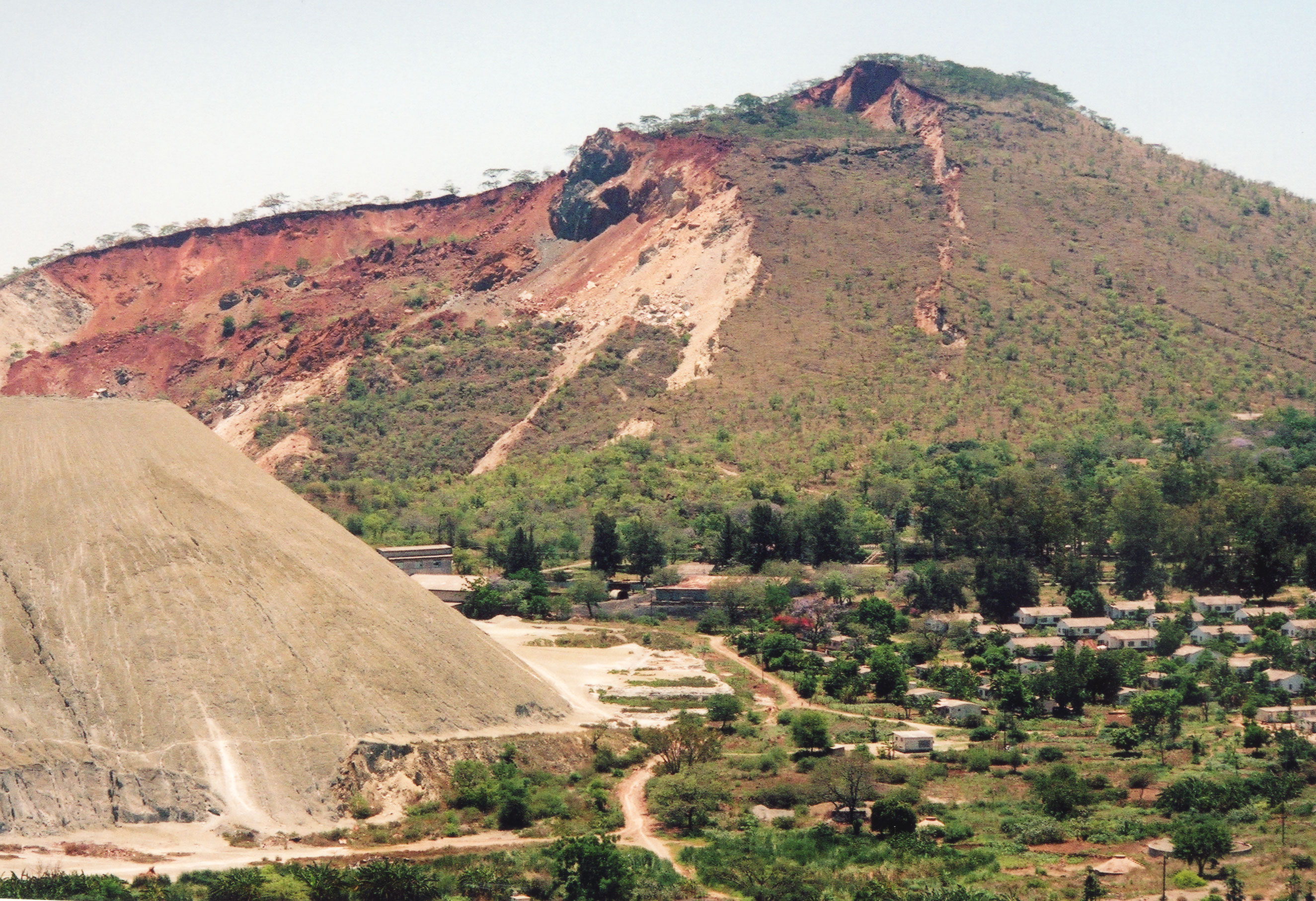
Reddish Hills of Mashava at King Mine

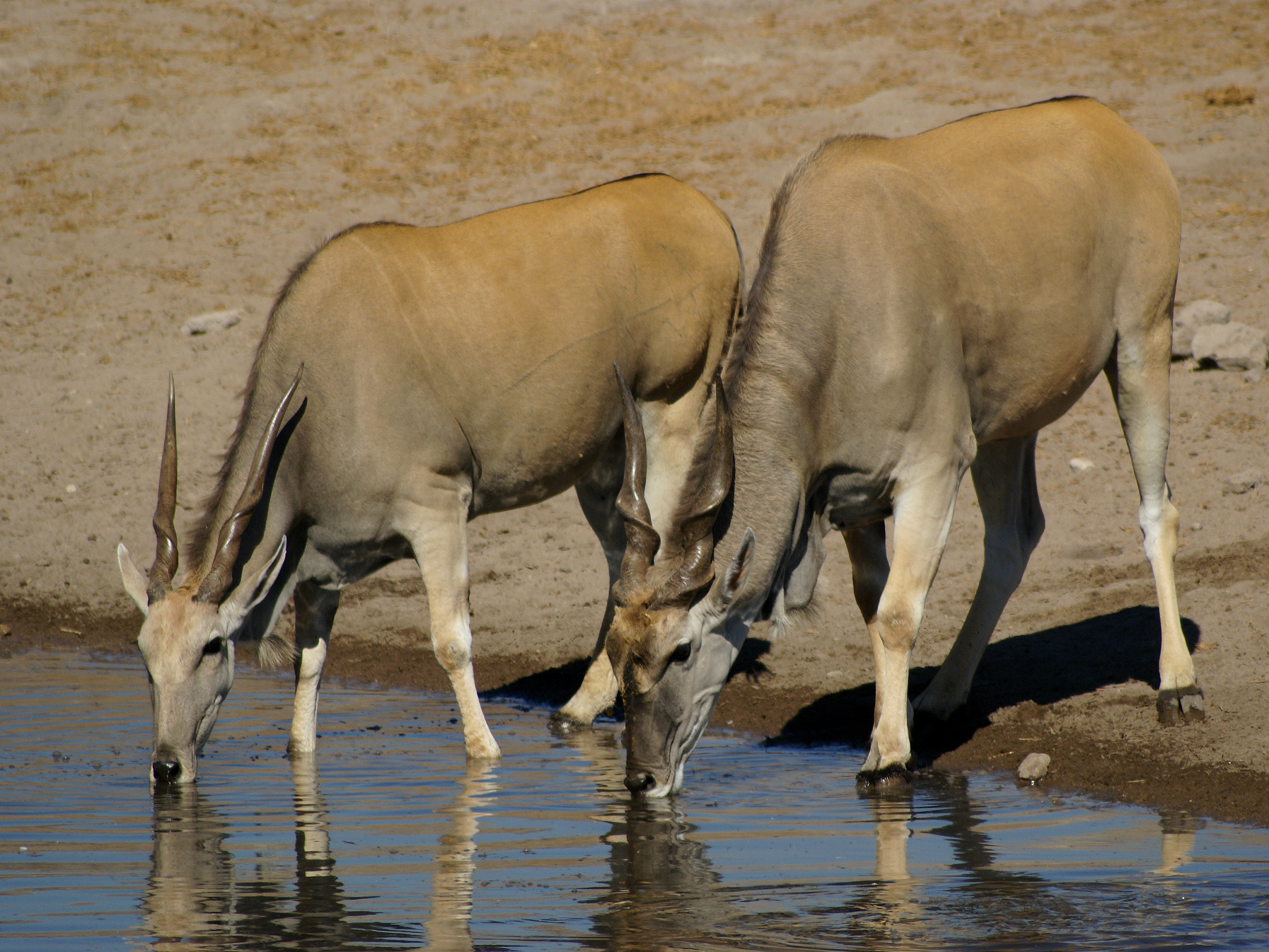
Shava is the name of the eland in ChiShona. The colour of these common elands is lighter than that of the giant elend above; so the colour is shavane or Shavani hence Zvishavane.

Zvishavane District is one of the eight districts in Midlands Province of Zimbabwe. 85,035 people live in Zvishavane rural and 59,714 live in Zvishavane town (2022 census).

It has Mberengwa District to the south and Shurugwi District to the north.

Its capital is Zvishavane town.

== Economy ==
Zvishavane District is home of Zvishavane Town which developed from an asbestos mine compound into a town. See Shabanie Mashaba Mine.

It is also home to Murowa Diamond Mine located in Mazvihwa, 40 km from Zvishavane Town.

== Local government ==
Zvishavane District is run by two local government organs, the rural district council and the urban council.

For the rural district authority see Runde Rural District Council.

The Zvishavane Town Council, established in terms of the Zimbabwe Urban Councils Act, Chapter 29.15, administers the urban district.

2013 - 2018 Council

Source: Zimbabwe Electoral Commission

Ward	Councillor	Party	Constituency
01	Phiri Arusah	ZANU-PF	
02	Mudekwa Isaiah	ZANU-PF	
03	Phiri Fatuma	MDC-T	
03	Utonga Andrew	ZANU-PF	
04	Majama Charity	MDC-T	
05	Mago Tinashe	ZANU-PF	
06	Ferreira Jose Manuel	ZANU-PF	
06	Chitototo Josiphati	MDC-T	
07	Dube Esau Gwatipedza	MDC-T	
08	Pasira Itai	MDC-T	
09	Chikandiwa Andrew	MDC-T	
10	Gadziwa Samuel	MDC-T	

2008 - 2013 Town Council

Source: Kubatana Aechive

Ward	Councillor	IParty	Remarks
01	Chimedza Sam	MDC-T	
02	Taruvinga Patson	MDC-T	
03	Murombedzi Francis	MDC-T	
04	Muvenge Francis Mashoko	MDC-T	
05	Dube Nyika Jastin Berebende	MDC-T	
06	Matondo London	MDC-T	
07	Pamire Godfrey	MDC-T	
08	Zhou Alluwis	MDC-T	Chairman
09	Moyo Mordikai Masocha	MDC-T	
10	Mushipe Pardon	MDC-T	

== See also ==
- Runde RDC
- Tongogara RDC
- Mutumwa Mawere
- Murowa
- Mashava
