= Mackintoshia =

Conservation status
- Least Concern (IUCN 3.1)

Scientific classification
- Kingdom: Fungi
- Division: Basidiomycota
- Class: Agaricomycetes
- Order: Boletales
- Family: Boletaceae
- Genus: Mackintoshia; Pacioni & C.Sharp (2000)
- Species: M. persica

Binomial name
- Mackintoshia persica Pacioni & C.Sharp (2000)

Genus of fungi

Mackintoshia is a fungal genus in the family Boletaceae. It was originally placed in Cortinariaceae. The genus is monotypic, containing the single truffle-like species Mackintoshia persica, found in Zimbabwe. This fungus, eaten by both the common duiker (Sylvicapra grimmia) and the Karanga people, is little known outside the Midlands Province of Zimbabwe. Mackintoshia was circumscribed by Giovanni Pacioni and Cathy Sharp in 2000. The genus name honors British-Rhodesian farmer Robbie Mackintosh, who collected and documented some early specimens. The specific epithet persica is Latin for peach, referring to its odor.
