= Zvishavane =

Town in Midlands, Zimbabwe

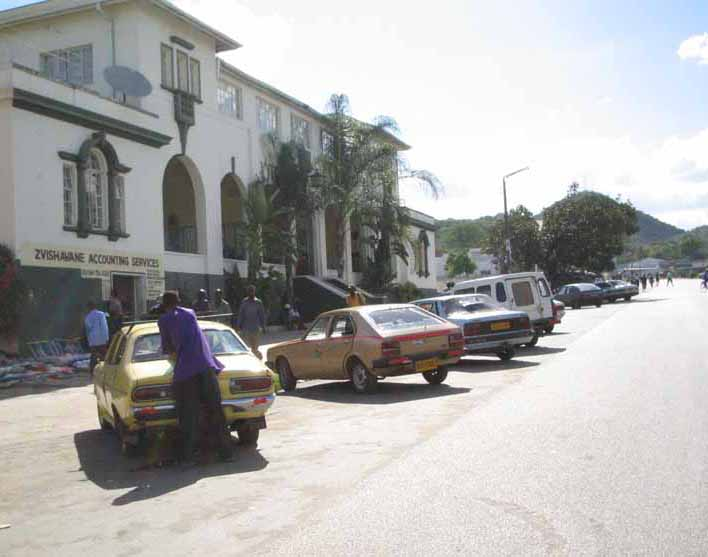
- Zvishavane

- Coat of arms

- Location within Zimbabwe
- Coordinates: 20°20′S 30°02′E
- Country: Zimbabwe
- Province: Midlands
- District: Zvishavane

Population (2022 census)
  - Total: 59,717
- Time zone: UTC+2 (CAT)
- Climate: BSh

Zvishavane, formerly known as Shabani, is a mining town in Midlands Province, Zimbabwe. Surrounded by low hills, it lies 97 kilometres (60 mi) west of Masvingo, on the main Bulawayo-Masvingo road. Other roads lead from Zvishavane to Gweru, 121 kilometres (75 mi) north, and Mberengwa, 27 kilometres (17 mi) south-west. It is also on direct rail links to Gweru and Beit Bridge which then link up with Harare and Bulawayo in Zimbabwe and to Maputo in Mozambique, and Pretoria in South Africa. It has a private airport serving the city.

== Name ==
Zvishavane was formerly called Shabanie (used by the mine) or Shabani (used for the town). The name is derived from the Shona adjective for reddish, referring to the hills around the town.

== History ==
The town developed as a residential centre for Shabani Mine, which started operations in 1916 to supply asbestos during the First World War. Growth was slow due to poor communications until the railway reached the town in 1928. Although the asbestos mine is the biggest producer of the mineral in Zvishavane, platinum, gold, beryl, chromite, iron ore at Buchwa and huge deposits of diamond at Murowa are also mined in the area.

The surrounding area is dominated by cattle ranching, while peasant agriculture is practiced in the nearby communal lands of Mberengwa and Buchwa.

The administration of Zvishavane has developed over the years to keep pace with its growth. A Village Management Board was set up in 1921 and replaced with a Town Management Board in 1930. It was granted municipal status in 1968.

== Population ==
The population of Zvishavane has grown substantially in recent decades due to a boom in mining activity. According to the 1982 Population Census, the town had a population of 26,758. By 1992, this had risen to 32,984. The population grew further to 35,128 in 2002 and was 45,325 in 2012.

== Major Companies ==
- Mimosa Mining Company
- Shabanie Mine
- Sabi Gold Mine
- Murowa Diamonds
- Pote Holdings
- Midlands State University
- TK engineering

== Transports ==
The village has a railway station on the Limpopo railway that connects it to Rutenga and Somabhula.

== Top Football Teams ==
Zvishavane is the home to 2 major football clubs which are:

- FC Platinum
- Shabanie Mine Football Club

== Notable residents ==
- Alumni of Shabani Primary School include Philip Matyszak, Judith Todd, and George Zambellas.
- Gift Amuli, musician
- Mbizvo Chirasha, poet
- Judy Croome, novelist
- Emmerson Mnangagwa, President of Zimbabwe
- Cephas Msipa, governor of Midlands province
- Lewis Matutu, Member of the ZANU-PF central committee, Deputy Secretary for Youth Affairs, Philanthropist, Entrepreneur.
- Elliot Mujaji, Paralympics gold medalist
- Clement Chimuti, Agrobusiness Entrepreneur of the year and renowned golfer, 2015, 2016, 2017
- Tafadzwa Mawarire, Athlete and former African and National motocross champion, Entrepreneur, Mechanical Engineering Technician
- Garfield Todd- founder of Dadaya mission and school, missionary and Prime Minister of Southern Rhodesia
- Judith Todd- author and journalist
