= Mberengwa Rural District Council =

Coordinates: 20.4769°S 29.8983°E

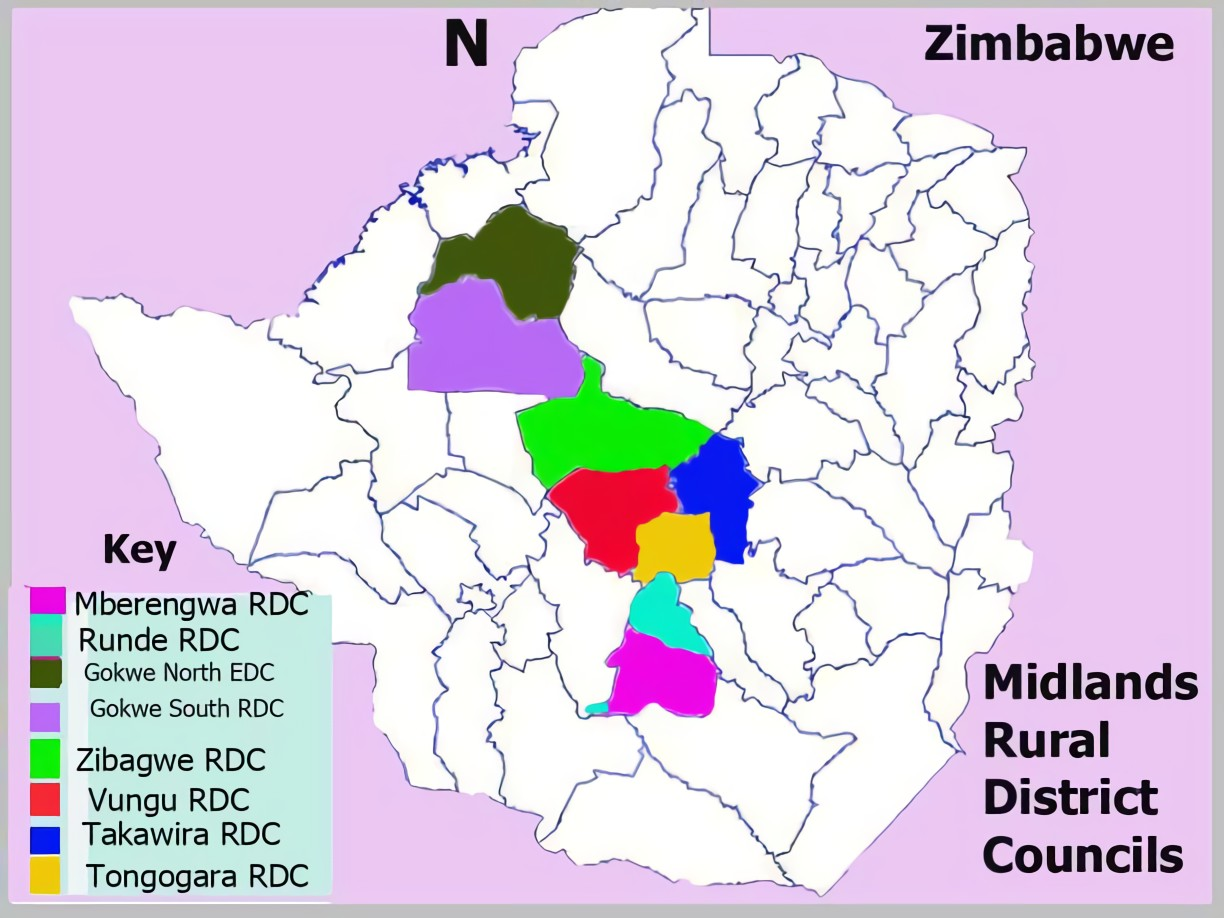
Midlands Rural District Councils

Mberengwa Rural District Council is the rural district local authority over Mberengwa District. It is one of the 8 rural district councils in the Midlands Province, established in terms of the Zimbabwe Rural District Councils Act; Chapter 29.13.

== Background ==
Mberengwa Rural District Council is the sole local government organ in Mberengwa District unlike Vungu Rural District Council, Zibagwe Rural District Council, Tongogara Rural District Council, Runde Rural District Council and Gokwe South Rural District Council that work together with urban councils in their respective district. Mberengwa District is all rural.

== Ward Distribution ==
Mberengwa Rural District Council covers 37 wards in four constituencies.

- Mberengwa-East has 12 wards:

3, 4, 5, 6, 7, 8, 18, 19, 20, 21, 22, and 23.

- Mberengwa-West has 12 wards:

1, 11, 12, 13, 14, 29, 30, 31, 32, 33, 34, and 36.

- Mberengwa-Central has 13 wards:

2, 9, 10, 15, 16, 17, 24, 25, 26, 27, 28, 35, and 37.

== 2023 - 2028 Councillors ==
Source: Zimbabwe Electoral Commission

Ward	Councillor	Gender	Party	Constituency
#01	Alfred Mutabvuri	M	ZANU-PF	Mberengwa-West
#02	Gadzirai Mudzingwa	M	ZANU-PF	Mberengwa-Central
#03	Ackson Charidza	M	ZANU-PF	Mberengwa-East
#04	Prince Matongo	M	ZANU-PF	Mberengwa-East
#05	Chenjerai Maisva	M	ZANU-PF	Mberengwa-East
#06	Misheck Zhou	M	ZANU-PF	Mberengwa-East
#07	Dambudzo Dungamanzi Hove	M	ZANU-PF	Mberengwa-East
#08	Ernest Dube	M	ZANU-PF	Mberengwa-East
#09	Calvinias Zhou	M	ZANU-PF	Mberengwa-Central
#10	Deviliers Mashavakure	M	ZANU-PF	Mberengwa-Central
#11	Pardon Mbondia	M	ZANU-PF	Mberengwa-West
#12	Nokuthula Ndlela	F	ZANU-PF	Mberengwa-West
#13	Milo Zhou	M	ZANU-PF	Mberengwa-West
#14	Robert Shumba	M	ZANU-PF	Mberengwa-West
#15	Albenias Nkonzo	M	ZANU-PF	Mberengwa-Central
#16	Lovemore Nkomo	M	ZANU-PF	Mberengwa-Central
#17	Nyembezi Togara	F	ZANU-PF	Mberengwa-Central
#18	Believe Mataga	M	ZANU-PF	Mberengwa-East
#19	Luckson Hamandishe	M	ZANU-PF	Mberengwa-East
#20	Florence Khumalo	F	ZANU-PF	Mberengwa-East
#21	Naiphet B Chauke	M	ZANU-PF	Mberengwa-East
#22	Garisikai Moyo	M	ZANU-PF	Mberengwa-East
#23	Sheunesu Shoko	M	ZANU-PF	Mberengwa-East
#24	Vakai Makuwerere	M	ZANU-PF	Mberengwa-Central
#25	Pedzisai Zhou	M	ZANU-PF	Mberengwa-Central
#26	Chemist Muzikamwi	M	ZANU-PF	Mberengwa-Central
#27	Ernest Gumbo	M	ZANU-PF	Mberengwa-Central
#28	Sithethindaba Zhou	M	ZANU-PF	Mberengwa-Central
#29	Chenjerai Bhunu	M	ZANU-PF	Mberengwa-West
#30	Pardon Zhou	M	ZANU-PF	Mberengwa-West
#31	Josephine Ncube	F	ZANU-PF	Mberengwa-West
#32	Pinat Moyo	M	ZANU-PF	Mberengwa-West
#33	Kollen Muhloro	M	ZANU-PF	Mberengwa-West
#34	John Chuma	M	ZANU-PF	Mberengwa-West
#35	Kufakunei Mzezewa	M	ZANU-PF	Mberengwa-Central
#36	Trevor Mlambo	M	ZANU-PF	Mberengwa-West
#37	Justin Mawombera	M	ZANU-PF	Mberengwa-Central

Council Chairperson: Garisikai Moyo (Ward 22)

Vice Council Chairperson: Ndlela Nokhuthula (Ward 12)

== 2013 - 2018 Councillors ==
Source: Zimbabwe Electoral Commission

Ward	Councillor	Gender	Party	Constituency
#01	Abson Magwizi	m	ZANU-PF	Mberengwa-North
#02	Tarirai Hove	f	ZANU-PF	Mberengwa-North
#03	Tsunga Maphosa	m	ZANU-PF	Mberengwa-East
#04	Kirion Ngara	m	ZANU-PF	Mberengwa-East
#05	Benki J Mushereketi	m	ZANU-PF	Mberengwa-East
#06	Misheck Zhou	m	ZANU-PF	Mberengwa-East
#07	Tofirei T Mhaka	m	ZANU-PF	Mberengwa-East
#08	Malayini Shava	m	ZANU-PF	Mberengwa-East
#09	Mark Hove	m	ZANU-PF	Mberengwa-North
#10	Deviliers Mashavakure	m	ZANU-PF	Mberengwa-North
#11	Alfred Hloka	m	ZANU-PF	Mberengwa-North
#12	Trust Shava	m	ZANU-PF	Mberengwa-North
#13	Milo Zhou	m	ZANU-PF	Mberengwa-West
#14	Renia Chomurovera	f	ZANU-PF	Mberengwa-West
#15	Ravasingadi Zhou	m	ZANU-PF	Mberengwa-North
#16	Lovemore Nkomo	m	ZANU-PF	Mberengwa-North
#17	Nyembezi Togara	f	ZANU-PF	Mberengwa-North
#18	Ben Mataga	m	ZANU-PF	Mberengwa-South
#19	Nelson Chinhamo	m	ZANU-PF	Mberengwa-South
#20	Florence Khumalo	m	ZANU-PF	Mberengwa-East
#21	Naiphet B Chauke	m	ZANU-PF	Mberengwa-South
#22	Enos Mashanda	m	ZANU-PF	Mberengwa-South
#23	Peter Mashoko	m	ZANU-PF	Mberengwa-South
#24	Vakai Makuwerere	m	ZANU-PF	Mberengwa-South
#25	Torai Matutu	m	ZANU-PF	Mberengwa-South
#26	John Tshikure	m	ZANU-PF	Mberengwa-South
#27	Elineth Goka	f	ZANU-PF	Mberengwa-South
#28	Rupee Ncube	m	ZANU-PF	Mberengwa-South
#29	Economias Masiya	m	ZANU-PF	Mberengwa-West
#30	Pardon Zhou	m	ZANU-PF	Mberengwa-West
#31	Adam Ncube	m	ZANU-PF	Mberengwa-West
#32	Ruben Jamela	m	MDC-T	Mberengwa-West
#33	Naison Maphosa	m	ZANU-PF	Mberengwa-West
#34	Nephat Shumba	m	ZANU-PF	Mberengwa-West
#35	Kufakunei Mzezewa	m	ZANU-PF	Mberengwa-North
#36	Trevor Mlambo	m	ZANU-PF	Mberengwa-North
#37	Abraham Moyo	m	ZANU-PF	Mberengwa-North

== 2008 - 2013 Coincillors ==
All councillors in this term were from ZANU-PF.

Source: Kubatana Aechive

Ward	Councillor	Gender	Constituency
#03	Hove Beliam	m	Mberengwa-East
#04	Ngara Kilion Muzikanwi	m	Mberengwa-East
#05	Benkie John Mushereketi	m	Mberengwa-East
#06	Zhou Misheck	m	Mberengwa-East
#09	Chinyoka Takarubuda	m	Mberengwa-North
#11	Hloka Alfred	m	Mberengwa-North
#12	Hove Ndakaitei Cathrine	f	Mberengwa-North
#14	Muchorovera Renia	-	Mberengwa-West
#15	Zhou Ravasingadi	-	Mberengwa-North
#17	Ndhlovu Nakisai	f	Mberengwa-North
#18	Mataga Ben	m	Mberengwa-South
#20	Khumalo Florence	f	Mberengwa-East
#23	Zhou Elizabeth	f	Mberengwa-South
#26	Tshikure Join	m	Mberengwa-South
#27	Goka Ellineth	f	Mberengwa-South
#28	Ncube Rupere	m	Mberengwa-South
#29	Masiya Economious	f	Mberengwa-West
#31	Ngwenya Maud Raviro	f	Mberengwa-West
#32	Sibanda Savid	m	Mberengwa-West
#33	Maphosa Nelson	m	Mberengwa-West
#34	Shumba Nephat	m	Mberengwa-West
#37	Moyo Abraham	m	Mberengwa-North

== See also ==
- Mberengwa District
- Runde Rural District Council
- Tongogara Rural District Council
- Takawira Rural District Council
- Gokwe North Rural District Council
