= Gaths Mine =

Asbestos mine in Mashava, Masvingo, Zimbabwe

- Interactive map of Gaths Mine
- Location: Mashava, Masvingo, Zimbabwe; 20°01′S 30°31′E
- Products: Asbestos
- Production: 0
- Company: Mutumwa Mawere

Gaths Mine is an abandoned asbestos mine in Mashava, Masvingo Province, Zimbabwe, and is located 40 km west of Masvingo city. The mine once employed over 1,600 people but production was stopped due to operational challenges.

== History ==
The mine site was first identified for development in 1904, with mining operations beginning in 1916.

In 1983 mining operations were suspended due to financial challenges associated with declining global demand for asbestos. It is unclear to what extent operations were continued or reestablished after this time, as the mine is also reported to have been closed in 2004 and 2011.

In 1996 the Gaths Mine and other mines near Mashava were sold to Zimbabwean business mogul Mutumwa Mawere under the name Shabanie and Mashaba Mines (SMM). When Mawere fled the country for South Africa in 2004, the Zimbabwean Government took control of the mine sites.

== Geology ==
Gaths Mine is located on the Mashava Igneous Complex. White asbestos (chrysotile) seams occur within serpentinized dunite.
