= Ikwelo River =

River in central Zimbabwe

Gweru River in the Gwayi River catchment (right)

Gweru River (known as Gwelo River until 1982) is a river in Midlands Province of Zimbabwe.

== Background ==
The name Gweru is a further distortion of the name Gwelo which was a distortion of the name Ikwelo meaning a very steep place where one would usually use a ladder upwards or downwards. Itself a distortion of the original Kalanga name of Gwelu an abbreviation of Gwelumatjena meaning the river of white stones. Legends say when Ndebele people first settled in the area, their women found it very difficult to draw water from the river because of its slippery steep banks. The river was then called 'Ikwelo' because the greater part of this 100 miles (160 km) long river has slippery steep banks all the way to its mouth in Shangani River. Women used ukwelo (ladder) then to help them fetch water from the river.

Gweru City was named from Ikwelo River. The European settlers pronounced as iGwelo shortened to Gwelo and after independence Zimbabweans shonalized it to Gweru, hence Gweru River.

== Operations ==
Gweru River has the 100 hactare Mabangeni Irrigation Scheme in Lower Gweru and the 165 hactare Exchange Irrigation Scheme in Zhombe supplied from Insukamini Dam and Exchange Block Dam respectively. Mabangeni Irrigation Scheme draws water from Insukamini Dam via a pick-up weir on Gweru River.

== Siltation and pollution ==
Semi-treated sewage has been polluting Gweru River over the years. but the Environmental Management Agency (EMA) is taking steps to harness water pollution in this and other rivers nationwide.

In another effort to fight water pollution in Gweru River a Midlalands State University student advocated awareness by junior secondary school students on Gweru River pollution and siltation. The campaign has been received by many organizations and schools in Gweru, the prime pollutants drainage basin of Gweru River.

== Tributaries ==
These are the original names based on Maps produced by the government of Rhodesia, now Zimbabwe.

- Kenyana River (Lower Gweru)
- Ngamo River (Lower Gweru)
- Matega River (Lower Gweru)
- Chakawa River (Lower Gweru)
- Mandingo River (Lower Gweru)
- Kalulani River (Lower Gweru_ off Shagari Dam)
- Batitswa River (Lower Gweru)
- Bembe River (Lower Gweru_ off Museyamwa Dam)
- Ingwenya River (Lower Gweru)
- Ntabemhlope River (Lower Gweru)
- Damba River (Silobela_ off Damba Dam)
- Zvanyanya River (Silobela)
- Semkulu River (_ off Totololo Dam)
- Summer River (Silobela Purchase Area)
- Mavhunatsvimbo River (Silobela)
- Ndhlamatuli River (Silobela)
- Marirangwe River (Zhombe)
- Gwembezi River (Silobela)
- Sangeni River (Silobela)
- Sehnga River
- Umhlafuto River (Silobela)
- Donsa River
- Nyauswe River (Zhombe)
- Semizi River (Zhombe)
- Mangwizi River (Zhombe)
- Setshanke River (Nkai)
- Gwelutshena River (Nkayi_ off Gwelutshena Dam)
- Ngenungenu River (Nkayi) last tributary before meeting Shangani River.
- Tohwe River (Nkayi)

== See also ==
- Shangani River
- Gweru
- Exchange Irrigation Scheme
- Mabangeni Irrigation Scheme
- Insukamini Irrigation Scheme
- List of rivers of Zimbabwe
