= Gweru District =

Coordinates: 19.461632°S 29.820595°E

Gweru
- District
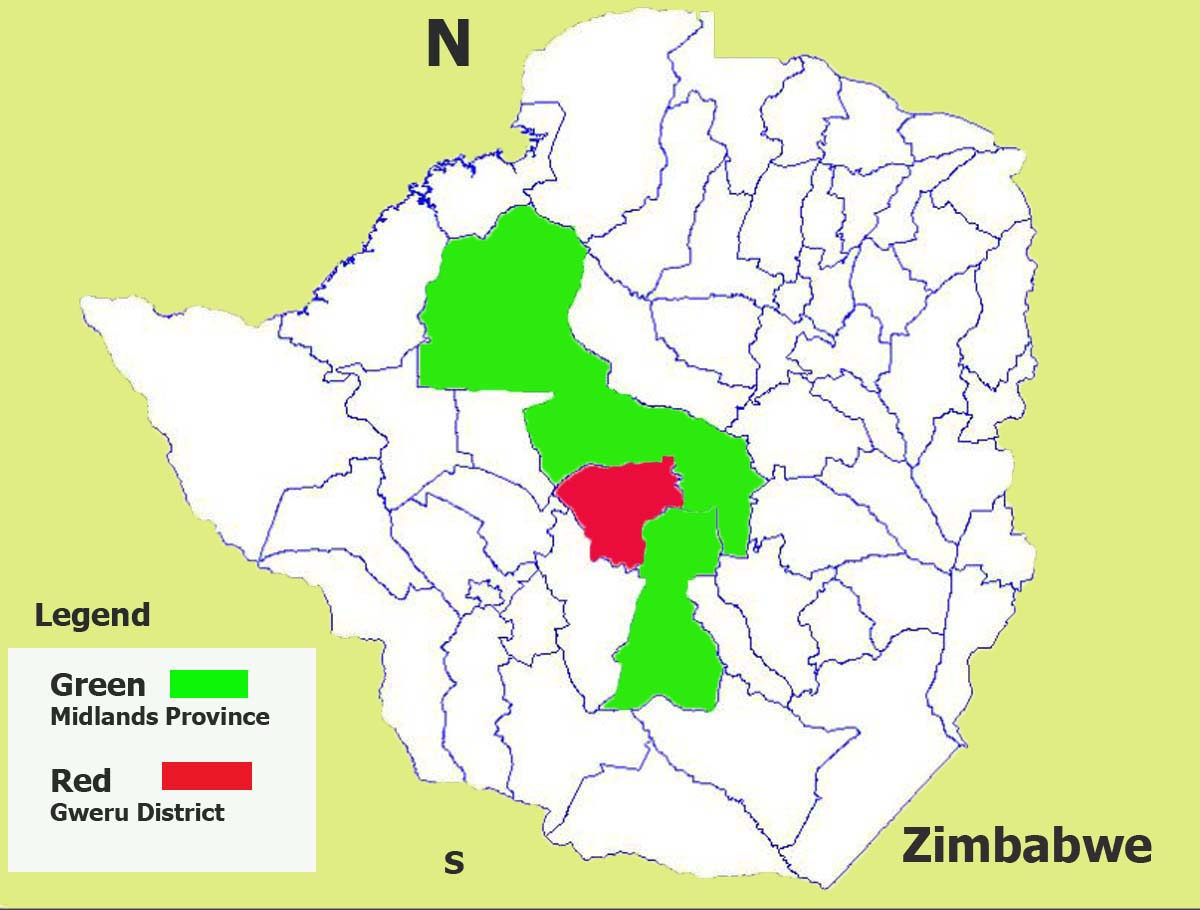
- Gweru District of Midlands Province
- Country: Zimbabwe
- Province: Midlands
- District: Gweru
- Established: late 19th century

Population (2012 Census)
  - Total: 249,671
  - Density: 22.08/km^{2} (57.2/sq mi)
- Time zone: UTC+2 (CAT)

Gweru District is a district in the Midlands Province of Zimbabwe.

== Background ==
Gweru District gets its name from Gweru River which has the city as its source and primary drainage basin.

The name Gweru is a further corruption of the name Gwelo which was a distortion of the name Ikwelo given by isiNdebele speakers in the late 19th century. Ikwelo was the district because it was not a spot name but rather a name given to a place along the length of the river in question as written by Colonel Carbutt, of Southern Rhodesia as published by the then Chief Information Officer, Information Services Branch. (Division of Native Affairs, Salisbury September, 1960) in the article Lore and Legend: Southern Rhodesia Place Names.

Gweru District has a population of over 231,675.

It has Shurugwi District to the southeast, Chirumhanzu District to the east, Insiza District southwest, Bubi District to the west, Nkayi District northwest and Kwekwe District north.

== Gweru City Climate ==
Climate data for Gweru (1961–1990)
Month	Jan	Feb	Mar	Apr	May	Jun	Jul	Aug	Sep	Oct	Nov	Dec	Year
Mean daily maximum °C (°F)	26.3 (79.3)	25.8 (78.4)	25.8 (78.4)	24.7 (76.5)	22.9 (73.2)	20.6 (69.1)	20.5 (68.9)	23.3 (73.9)	26.8 (80.2)	28.3 (82.9)	27.4 (81.3)	26.3 (79.3)	24.9 (76.8)
Mean daily minimum °C (°F)	15.3 (59.5)	15.1 (59.2)	13.8 (56.8)	11.3 (52.3)	7.6 (45.7)	4.9 (40.8)	4.5 (40.1)	6.5 (43.7)	10.0 (50.0)	13.1 (55.6)	14.5 (58.1)	15.1 (59.2)	11.0 (51.8)
Average rainfall mm (inches)	139.1 (5.48)	124.8 (4.91)	55.9 (2.20)	29.0 (1.14)	7.7 (0.30)	1.9 (0.07)	1.0 (0.04)	1.9 (0.07)	9.3 (0.37)	35.1 (1.38)	96.2 (3.79)	159.4 (6.28)	661.3 (26.04)
Average rainy days	12	10	7	3	1	1	0	0	1	4	9	12	60

Source:World Meteorological Organization

== Gweru Rural ==
Gweru District is administered by the District Administrator who is an ex-officio of (Gweru City Council and Gweru Rural District Council. for Gweru rural.

Gweru rural district includes Lower Gweru and the greater part of Chiwundura

Education Primary education

- zororo b sch
- st Patrick pri
- Gomo pri
- Gambiza pri sch

Secondary education

st Patrick high school

st Barnabas high school

st philimon secondary school

Gunde.sundula

- Notable people

See also: Category:People from Chiwundura

- Evidence Maredzwa, The Gambler

== Gweru Urban ==
Urban districts are administered by urban councils established in terms of the Zimbabwe Urban Councils Act, Chapter 29.15

Gweru local authority is Gweru Municipality which is literally Gweru City Council.

Like in most urban centers nationwide Gweru City Council is dominated by MDC-T.

2013 - 2018 Term

Source: Zimbabwe Electoral Commission

Ward	Councillor	Gender	IParty	Constituency
01	Kombayi Hamutendi	m	MDC-T	
02	Chipondeni Tiripai	m	ZANU-PF	
03	Mbano Nokuthula	f	MDC-T	
04	Sithole Kenneth Marekiwa	m	MDC-T	
05	Marecha Moses	m	MDC-T	
05	Mafa Mafa Kwanisai	m	ZANU-PF	
06	Tsanyawu Joas	m	ZANU-PF	
07	Matyorauta Artwell	m	MDC-T	
08	Ndaguta Willard	m	MDC-T	
09	Fundira Gibson Jackson	m	MDC-T	
10	Chikozho Charles	m	MDC-T	
11	Chirau Albert	m	MDC-T	
12	Mavhondo Elvis	m	MDC-T	
13	Mhondiwa Catherine	f	MDC-T	
14	Guduza Ernest	m	MDC-T	
15	Mhondiwa Norman Alexander	m	MDC-T	
16	Magidi Tawanda	m	MDC-T	
17	Muza Farai Jonathan	m	MDC-T	
18	Magara Bonface	m	MDC-T	

Gweru mayor for this term was Clr. Hamutendi Kombayi

2008 - 2013 Term

Source: Kubatana Aechive

Ward	Councillor	Gender	IParty	Remarks
01	Mufunde Fungayi Desmond	m	MDC-T	Mayor (Died June 2009)
02	Dzuda Holly	-	MDC-T	
03	Pasipanodya Nelson	m	MDC-T	
04	Sithole Kenneth Marekiwa	m	MDC-T	
05	Chikweche Enock Mukandi	m	MDC-T	
06	Mukwazhe Ferinos	m	MDC-T	
07	Matyorauta Artwell	m	MDC-T	
08	Demo Taurai	m	MDC-T	
09	Chimombe Takavada Tadious	m	MDC-T	
10	Munach Arminon Takaidza	m	MDC-T	
11	Rutsvara Kumirai	m	MDC-T	
12	Mavondo Elves	m	MDC-T	
13	Dzingisoh Canaan Chabhabha	m	MDC-T	
14	Tsuro Wonder James	m	MDC-T	
15	Chineni Trust	m	MDC-T	
16	Makumbe Trinos	m	MDC-T	
17	Kwaru Clemence	m	MDC-T	
18	Mpofu Muchaneta	-	MDC-T	

The mayor was Councilor Desmond Fungayi Mufunde who died on 21 June 2009.

== Operations ==
Gweru District, district number three of the 61 in Zimbabwe has Gweru City the 3rd largest city in Zimbabwe as its capital.

Gweru City is also Midlands provincial capital. It is located 164 km northeast of Bulawayo and 275 km south-west-south of Harare via Mvuma ( A17 Highway ) or 278 km via Kwekwe ( A5 Highway ).

. Gwer District is home to * Roman Catholic Diocese of Gweru, * Lower Gweru,* Gweru River,* Riverside School,* Ascot Stadium, * Chapungu United, * Nalatale, * Danangombe,* Dabuka, * Chaplin High School,* Thornhill High School, *Sacred Heart College,* Midlands Christian College, * Nashville Secondary School, * Fletcher High School,* Midlands State University,* Gweru Sports Club and * Gweru-Thornhill Air Base to name a few.
