= Zvishavane Airport =

Airport in Zvishavane, Zimbabwe

- IATA: none; ICAO: FVSH

Summary
- Airport type: Private
- Location: Zvishavane
- Elevation AMSL: 3,012 ft / 918 m
- Coordinates: 20°17′22″S 30°5′18″E

Map
- Location in Zimbabwe

Runways
Direction	Length		Surface
Direction	ft	m	Surface
16/34	3,942	1,202
- World Aero Data

Zvishavane Airport (ICAO: FVSH) is a private airport in Zvishavane, Zimbabwe.

== See also ==
- Transport in Zimbabwe
