= Lower Gwelo (Zimbabwe) =

Coordinates: 19.23334°S 29.25°E

- Settlement type: Linear along roads, dispersed elsewhere
- Interactive map of Lower Gwelo
- Country: Zimbabwe
- Province: Midlands

Government
  - Parliamentarian: Omega Sibanda
- Time zone: UTC+2 (SAST)

Lower Gwelo is a developed communal settlement in the Midlands province, Zimbabwe and is located about 40km north-west of Gweru, and stretches a further 50 km to the west. Lower gwelo was initially called Somabhula and later became Somabhula ekhanyayo after the establishment of Seventh day adventist missions stations that covered the entire area. The 2 main Chiefs in the Lower Gwelo area are Chief Sogwala and Chief Bunina. There are 5 Headmen (smaller chiefs) under Chief Sogwala:

- Sikombingo;
- Mdubiwa;
- Madikane;
- Nkawana; and
- Nyama

There is only one Headman under Chief Bunina, Chisadza.

The settlement type is mostly linear along roads, although it is dispersed in some remote areas. There are several business centres which include Mission, Mankunzane, Makepesi, Sikombingo, Dufuya, Mangwande, Sogwala, Maboleni and Insukamini. This former district administration centre which is also one of the few state townships in the country. Maboleni and Insukamini are the two growth points within lower Gwelo.

== Geography ==
Most of the areas are well watered and marshy. The major river is Vungu River locally referred to as u"Vunku" which is a tributary of the greater Shangani River. Gweru River locally referred to as u"Gelu" also passes through here to Shangani River.

== Demography ==
The principal language is isiNdebele and is understood by virtually the whole populace. Lower Gwelo residents are nearly all followers of SDA church and most schools are still run buy the church to date.

== Economy ==
Market gardening is the main economic activity in Lower Gwelo since the soils are fertile and well watered all year round. People of Lower Gwelo they are on second position in gardens in the midlands province following Gokwe in planting Vegetables, Fruits and maize.

== Irrigation schemes ==
It is positioned agro ecological region IV of Zimbabwe. Natural regions IV and V are too dry for successful crop production without irrigation. Lower Gweru has been blessed with the following irrigation schemes:

- Insukamini Dam
- Mkoba Irrigation Scheme
- Mambanjeni Irrigation Scheme
- Shagari Irrigation Scheme (not functional)

== Notable places ==
- Maboleni
- Insukamini
- Lower Gwelo Mission
- Insukamini ruins
- Sikombingo where the second SDA mission was established after Solusi Mission.

== Sogwala ==
Sogwala, known as koMumbu omanzi, is a village located in the northwest of Gweru, Zimbabwe. It is known by its nickname koMumbu omanzi which means fresh corn.

== Demography ==
The official language is isiNdebele and is understood by the whole populace.

== Geography ==
As the nickname suggests this is how the soil is, in the area, it is wet right around the year. The major river is Vungu River which is a tributary of the greater Shangani River. Gweru River also passes through here to Shangani River.

- Lower Gwelo Mission
- Sikombingo
- Mangwande
- Mzila
- NtabaMhlophe
- Dwaleni
- Dufuya
- Mhlahlandlela
- Turnoff Mabilisa
- Phakama
- Lahleka
- Makhulambila
- Madikane
- Mankunzane
- Shagari
- St Faith
- Makepesi
- Matshabeleni
- Dimbamiwa
- Sibomvu
- Vungu

== See also ==
- Nsukumini Map
- Zimbabwe Situation
