= Midlands Province =

Coordinates: 19°00′S 30°00′E

Midlands: Dunhu reMidlands (Shona); Isabelo seMidlands (Northern Ndebele)
- Province
- Midlands, Province of Zimbabwe
- Country: Zimbabwe
- Capital: Gweru

Government
  - Type: Provincial Government
  - Minister of State for Provincial Affairs: Owen Ncube (ZANU-PF)

Area
  - Total: 49,166 km^{2} (18,983 sq mi)

Population (2022 census)
  - Total: 1,811,905
  - Density: 36.853/km^{2} (95.448/sq mi)
- HDI (2021): 0.590 medium · 3rd of 10

Midlands is a province of Zimbabwe. It has an area of 49,166 square kilometres (18,983 mi^{2}) and a population of 1,811,905 (2022). It spread across eight administration district: Gweru, Gokwe south, Kwekwe, Mberengwa, Shurugwi, eZvishavane and Chirumanzu. It is home to various peoples. Located at a central point in the country, it contains speakers of Shona, Ndebele, Tswana, Sotho, Vendaand Chewa, as well as of various other languages. The main language in Midlands province are Shona and isiNdebele with Shona acting as a primary, widespread language and isiNdebele heavily featured in specific districs. Shona is the most widely spoken language, particularly in areas like Gweru with dialects such as Karanga, Zezuru and Mhari commonly used. IsiNdebele prevalent in the western parts of the province and in areas bordering Mathebeleland. Gweru, the third-largest city in Zimbabwe, is the capital of the province.

Midlands Province contains Kwekwe, a city in with dominant mining and manufacturing industries, in which the Sable Chemicals Trust also maintains a presence.

== Demographics ==
| Census | Population |
|---|---|
| 2002 | 1,463,993 |
| 2012 | 1,614,941 |
| 2022 | 1,811,905 |

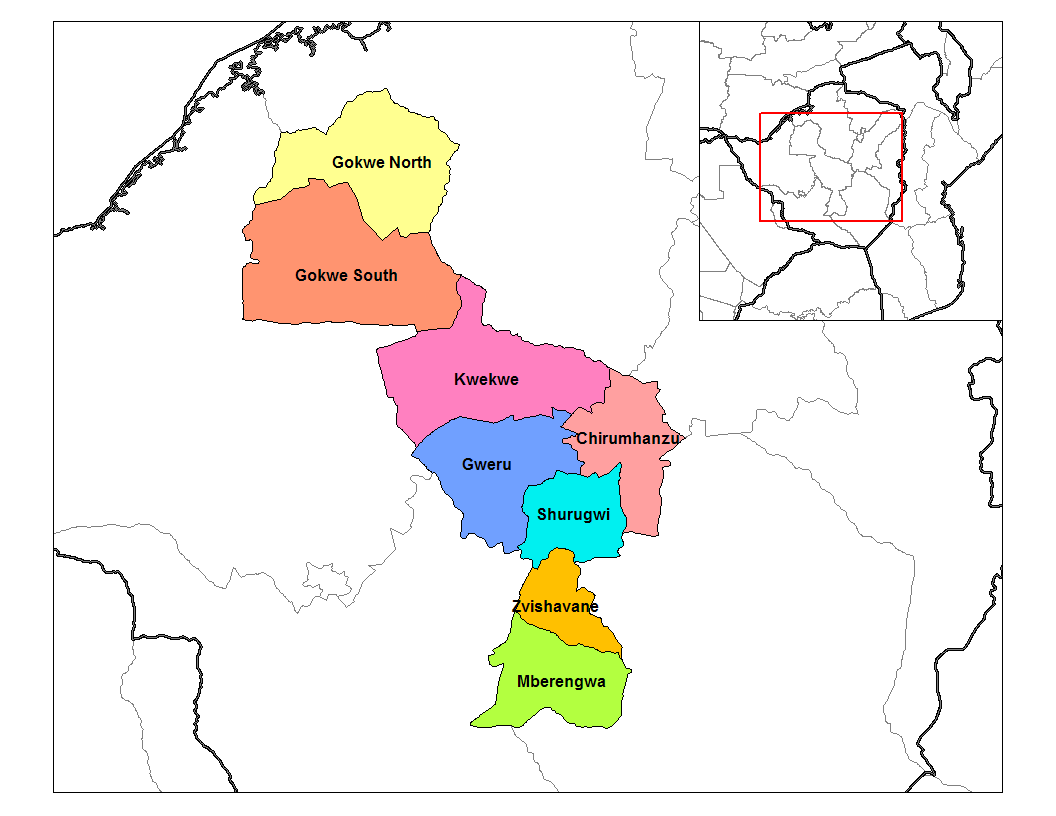
Districts of Midlands

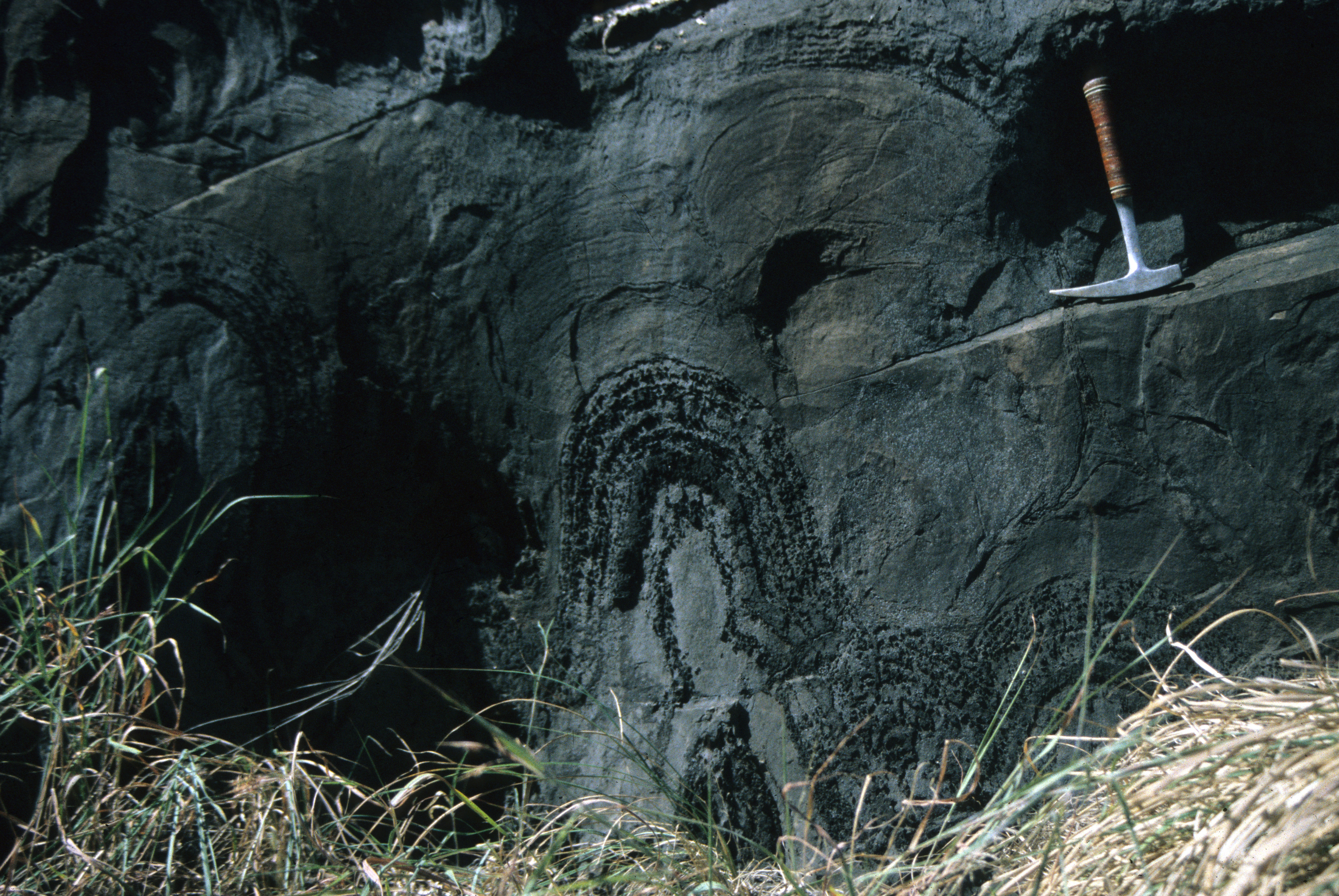
Fossil Stromatolites, around 2650 million years old. Mberengwa, Midlands

== Geography ==
Generally hilly and temperate, similar to the Highveldt of South Africa.

=== Districts ===
Midlands Provinces is divided into eight districts:

- Chirumhanzu
- Gokwe North
- Gokwe South
- Gweru
- Kwekwe
- Mberengwa
- Shurugwi
- Zvishavane

== Local government ==
The Provincial Administrator oversees all eight districts in the province, each district having its own district administrator. District Administrators work with local authorities in their respective districts, with the local authorities having their own Chairmen (mayors for municipalities). These urban councils were established in accordance with the Zimbabwe Urban Councils Act, Chapter 29.15 while rural district councils were created in terms of the Zimbabwe Rural District Councils Act, Chapter 29.13

Of the eight districts, Gokwe South, Gweru, Kwekwe, Shurugwi and Zvishavane have two local government administrative authorities; the Urban District Council (town council or municipality) and the Rural District Council. Chirumhanzu, Gokwe North and Mberengwa districts have no urban councils.

Mberengwa's main economic activities are mostly concentrated at Mataga growth point.

=== Rural councils ===
The 8 rural district councils in all 8 subdivisions;

- Gokwe North RDC in Gokwe North
- Gokwe South RDC in Gokwe South
- Mberengwa RDC in Mberengwa
- Runde RDC in Zvishavane
- Tongogara RDC in Shurungwi
- Takawira RDC in Chirumhanzu
- Vungu RDC in Gweru
- Zibagwe RDC in Kwekwe

=== Urban councils ===
- City Councils in the province are Gweru and Kwekwe municipalities.
- Town Councils are Shurugwi, Zvishavane and Gokwe, Redcliff.

== See also ==
- Provinces of Zimbabwe
- Districts of Zimbabwe
