= Mutumwa Mawere =

Zimbabwean businessman (1960–2026)

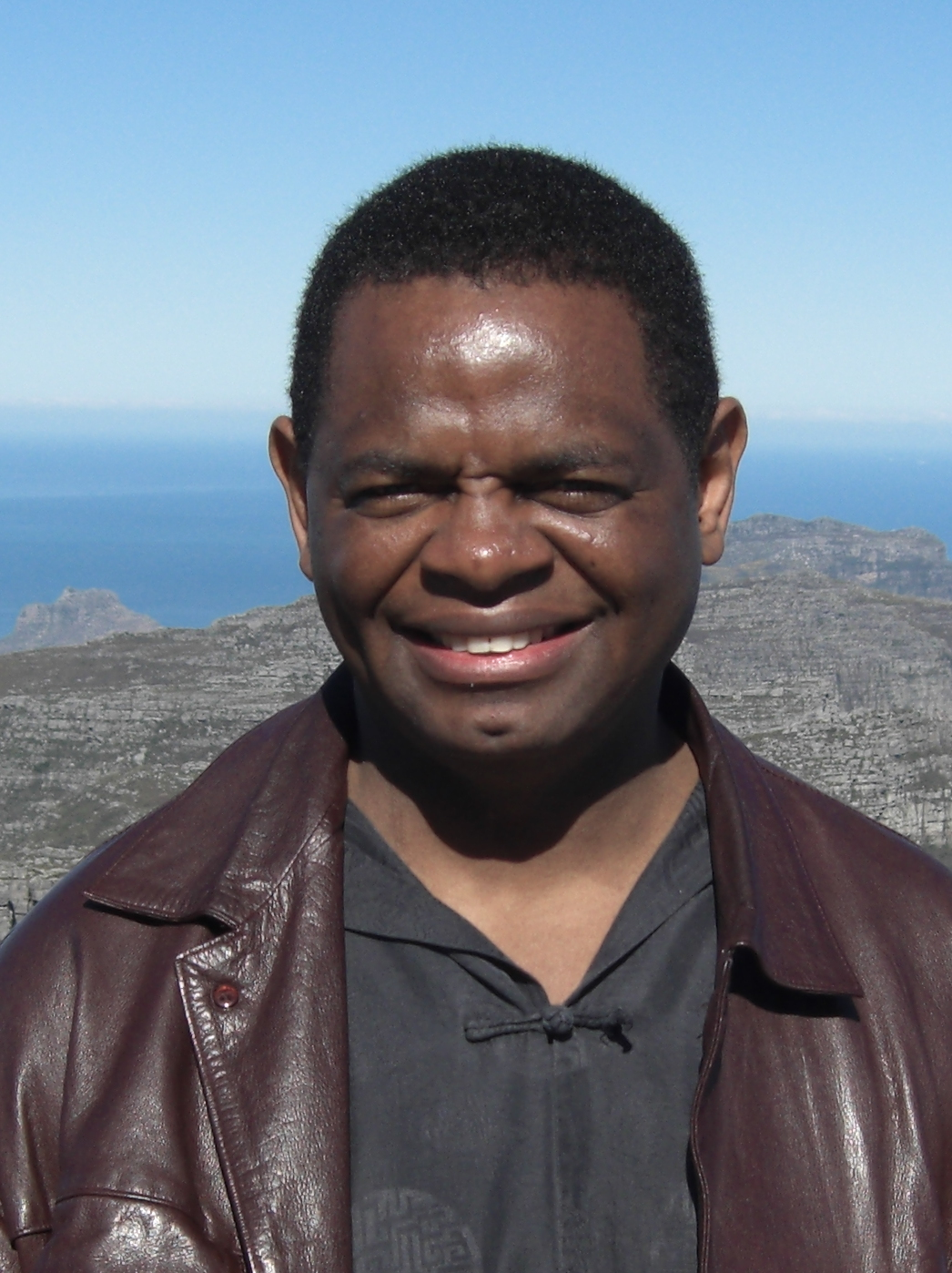
- Mawere in 2007
- Born: 11 January 1960; Bindura, Southern Rhodesia, Rhodesia and Nyasaland (now Zimbabwe)
- Died: 15 January 2026 (aged 66); Johannesburg, South Africa
- Occupation: Businessman
- Website: www.mmawere.com

Mutumwa Dziva Mawere (11 January 1960 – 15 January 2026) was a Zimbabwean-South African businessman with interests in mining, manufacturing and agricultural industries, financial services (banking and insurance), telecommunications, publishing, investment holdings, transport and logistics, and international trading, among others. He created businesses and turned around enterprises that have become Pan-African and global players, most notably Africa Resources Limited (ARL) which was one of the most powerful and influential corporations in Zimbabwe's history.

== Background ==
Mawere was educated in Zimbabwe, Swaziland, the United Kingdom and the United States, obtaining a Master of Science (Management) and an MBA (Finance & Investments) degree. Among his first employers were the Industrial Development Corporation of Zimbabwe and the Merchant Bank of Central Africa. In 1988, he joined the World Bank, where he rose to become a Senior Investment Officer with the International Finance Corporation. In 1995, he and the Mawere family became residents of South Africa, obtaining citizenship in 2002.

== Business empire ==
In 1996, Mawere acquired Zimbabwe's sole asbestos mining company Shabanie Mashaba Mines (SMM), branching out through all of Zimbabwe's economy. His rise was accompanied by allegations of improper support by politicians from the ruling Zimbabwe African National Union – Patriotic Front (ZANU-PF), especially in connection with government guarantees for a US$60 million loan used in the purchase of SMM. Mawere denied these claims, saying that purchase payments were guaranteed by a deposit of shares of the mining company instead.

== Demise of his business empire ==
In 2004, Mawere's business empire came under government scrutiny, and allegations of prejudicing the state of more than Z$300 billion were raised by the authorities. In May, Zimbabwean authorities asked for Mawere's extradition from South Africa, but failed. Since then, by presidential decree major parts of his businesses came under government control. According to Mawere, his businesses' funds were used to repay due International Monetary Fund bonds.

== Columnist ==
After his businesses were seized, Mawere wrote a number of articles about the situation in Zimbabwe, starting with his own situation and a vindication of his past business deals. His op-eds appeared in several online news websites that cater to Zimbabweans scattered across the world.

== Death ==
Mawere died at the Mediclinic Sandton Hospital in Johannesburg, on 15 January 2026, four days after his 66th birthday.

== See also ==
- Gideon Gono
- Jonathan Moyo
