= Shurugwi District =

District in southern Zimbabwe

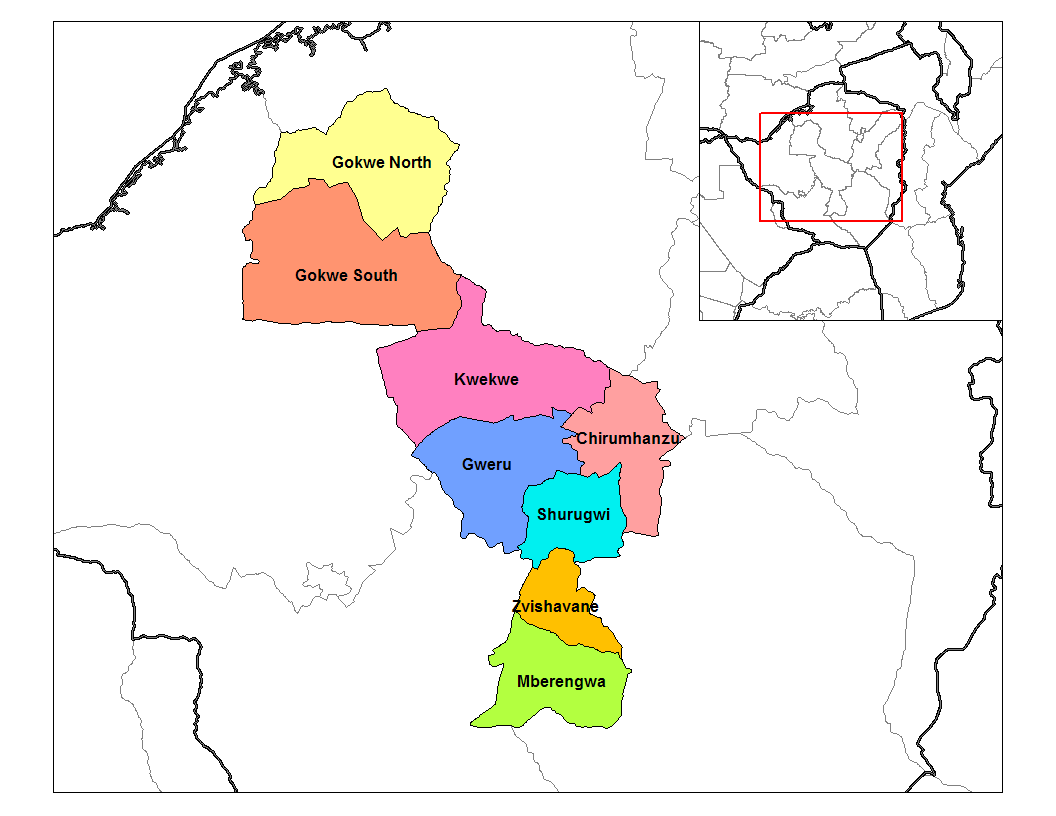
Map of the districts in Midlands Province

Shurugwi, originally known as Selukwe, is a district located in Midlands Province, southern Zimbabwe. 98,315 people live in Shurugwi rural and 23,304 live in Shurugwi town (2022 census).

== Background ==
It is an important centre for gold, platinum and chrome mining, but it is perhaps best known as the home district of the former Rhodesian Prime Minister Ian Douglas Smith who owned a farm near Gwenoro Dam. Its principal town is also called Shurugwi. It is located about 30 kilometres from the Midlands Provincial capital Gweru. Shurugwi District encompasses much of the rural areas of Nhema and some parts of Chivi. The district has seen a resurgence of mining activities after the discovery of platinum at Unki which lies a few kilometres just after the Wolfshall Pass (Boterekwa). This has seen the establishment of a large mining complex by Implats (Impala Platinum) and the refurbishing of houses which used to belong to the old Zimasco employees.

== Demography ==
Shurugwi district is predominantly occupied by the Karanga ethnic people who form the majority of the population but there are other minorities like Ndebele speaking people in the Rockford small scale purchase farms and the Dlodlo area. Other ethnic people are the few remaining ex-employees of Zimasco who are predominantly of Malawian extraction.

== Geography ==
The region is dominated by the Great Dyke which dissects it in the middle. Much of the other areas are made up of poor sandy soils which support subsistence agriculture. Tokwe river, locally known as Tugwi runs in the middle of Rockford Farmlands making the area potentially viable for agricultural projects in addition to mineral wealth.

== Politics ==
Politically Shurugwi district saw a lot of fighting between Zimbabwe African National Liberation Army fighters and Rhodesian forces which led to significant deaths among the civilian population (1976–79). It has remained a predominantly ZANU-PF stronghold since independence.

== Local Government ==
Town Council

Shurugwi District is run by two local government arms, one for the rural district and the other for the urban district.

For the rural district see Tongogara RDC

Shurugwi Town Council created in terms of the Zimbabwe Urban Councils Act, Chapter 29.15 administers 13 urban wards of Shurugwi North Constituency.

2013 - 2018 Council

Electoral Commission

Ward	Councillor	Gender	Party
01	Mukokanduku Janet	F	ZANU-PF
02	Nyamatendedza obert	M	MDC-T
03	Mukorovi Zvidzai	M	MDC-T
04	Mavhenyegwa Samue Obriel	M	MDC-T
05	Mapwanya Davias	M	ZANU-PF
06	Kasama Jackson	M	MDC-T
07	Machiya Fanuel	M	MDC-T
08	Makore Tsungai	M	ZANU-PF
09	Mahachi Yudit Tsungirirai	F	ZANU-PF
10	Mudzimu Maggie	F	ZANU-PF
11	Gara Brighton	M	ZANU-PF
12	Hapazari Paradzai	M	ZANU-PF
13	Pedzisai Wonder	M	ZANU-PF

2008 - 2013 Council

Source: Kubatana Aechive

Ward	Councillor	Gender	Party
01	Mukokanduku Janet	f	Zanu-PF
02	Nyamatendedza Obert	m	MDCZ
03	Mukorovi Zvidzai	m	MDCZ
04	Madziture Bulle	m	MDCZ
05	Mashoko Onisimo	m	MDCZ
06	Mbizo Regiment	m	MDCZ
07	Zamuchiya Reketayi	-	MDCZ
08	Chauke Gibson	m	MDCZ
09	Mahachi Tsungurirai Yudit	-	Zanu-PF
10	Mudzimu Maggie	f	Zanu-PF
11	Takavarasha Jericco	m	MDCZ
12	Madzivire Lucia	m	MDCZ
13	Venantio Phiri	m	MDCZ

== Health ==
Shurugwi has not escaped the scourge of the AIDS pandemic with many of its youthful people succumbing to the deadly virus.

== Education ==
Shurugwi boasts several higher education institutions like Hanke Seventh Day Adventist Mission, Tongogara High School and Pakame Mission which date back many years. It has a significant number of highly educated professionals like lawyers, doctors, accountants, engineers and others. Rockford farmlands were created by the Rhodesian Government in 1934 and became home to some Black elite luminaries of that time the most notable being one of the early Christian faith Black Pastors Philemon Dzimiri (1898-1978).

== See also ==
- Tongogara RDC
