= Constanza Airport =

Constanza Airport Expedición 14 de Junio Airport
- IATA: COZ; ICAO: MDCZ

Summary
- Airport type: Public
- Operator: Government
- Serves: Constanza, Dominican Republic
- Elevation AMSL: 3,950 ft (1,200 m)
- Coordinates: 18°54′27″N 70°43′15″W

Map
- Location of airport in Dominican Republic

Runways
Direction	Length		Surface
Direction	m	ft	Surface
08/26	1,900	6,234	Asphalt
- Sources: GCM Google Maps

Constanza National Airport (also known as Expedición 14 de Junio National Airport) (IATA: COZ, ICAO: MDCZ) is an airport located in Constanza, Dominican Republic. Situated within the Santo Domingo Flight Information Region at an elevation of 1,205 meters (3,952.4 feet), it holds the distinction of being the highest-altitude airport in the Caribbean basin. The airport features an active 2,040-by-23-meter asphalt runway and operates during daylight hours under the authority of the Dominican Air Force.

Following renovations, the facility reopened under its current name in May 2006 to serve tourist and cargo carriers. However, the airport has recently faced a prolonged operational closure due to an ongoing runway remodeling project managed by the Ministry of Public Works and Communications (MOPC), which required a complete restart after a contractor applied defective asphalt.

== History ==
On June 14, 1959, a covert military expedition was launched from Cuba to overthrow Rafael Leónidas Trujillo. Commanded by Enrique Jiménez Moya alongside Cuban military officer Delio Gómez Ochoa, a Curtiss C-46 Commando aircraft carrying 54 heavily armed Dominican exiles and international volunteers successfully landed at the high-altitude Constanza airfield under intense anti-aircraft fire. Juan de Dios Ventura Simó, a defected pilot, also joined the liberation forces. Although the initial landing was successful, the guerrilla forces were swiftly overwhelmed, resulting in 12 casualties during the fierce initial clashes before retreating into the mountains.

== Description ==
The aerodrome is located in Constanza, Dominican Republic, at coordinates 18° 54’ 27” N and 070° 43’ 19” W at an elevation of 1,205 meters (3,952.4 feet). It features a 2,040-by-23-meter asphalt runway with a 09/27 orientation and operates during daylight hours on 122.450 MHz under the authority of the Dominican Air Force. This facility uses the ICAO airport code MDCZ and IATA airport code COZ, possesses an alternative runway configuration designated as 8/26, and is situated within the Santo Domingo Flight Information Region.

== Operations ==
After renovations, it reopened in May 2006 and was renamed Expedicón 14 de Junio National Airport. It serves mostly tourist and cargo carriers. The airport is in low, mountainous terrain, 2 kilometers (1.2 mi) east of Constanza. There is rising terrain in all quadrants. The Santiago VOR/DME (Ident: SGO) is located 30.7 nautical miles (56.9 km) north-northeast of the airport.

As the highest-altitude airport in the Caribbean basin, it serves as a vital economic engine for the region's mountainous tourism and agricultural sectors. Despite these benefits, the airport has been closed for a prolonged period due to a runway remodeling project managed by the Ministry of Public Works and Communications (MOPC), during which a contractor's defective asphalt application has necessitated a complete redo.

== See also ==
- Transport in Dominican Republic
- List of airports in Dominican Republic
