= Vungu Rural District Council =

Local authority in Zimbabwe

Coordinates: 18.461632°S 29.820595°E

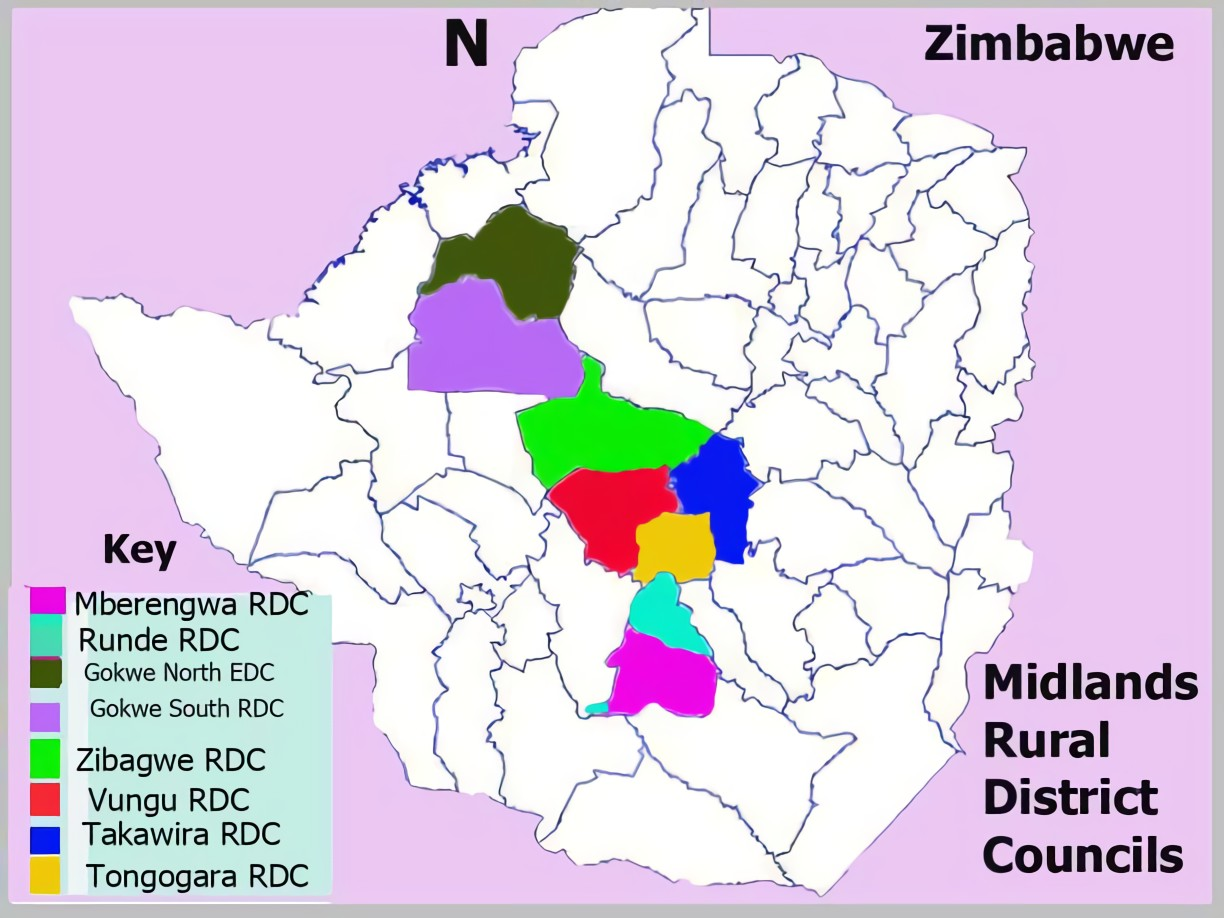
Midlands RDCs

Vungu Rural District Council is a local government arm overseeing the Gweru Rural District. It was created in terms of the Zimbabwe Rural District Councils Act; Chapter 29.13. Its capital is Gweru in Zimbabwe.

Vungu Rural District Council is literally Gweru Rural District Council taking care of the rural district with Gweru Municipality taking care of the urban district. It comprises two parliamentary constituencies, Chiwundura (eight wards) and Vungu (eleven wards) while Gweru Municipality comprises Gweru Urban and Mkoba metropolitan constituencies.

Chiwundura is east of the Harare-Bulawayo Highway and Vungu is on the west side of the highway.

== Ward Distribution ==
Ward No:	Inclusive Areas	Constituency
1	North Shangani & Sivu	Vungu
2	Madikani & Sogwala	Vungu
3	Dimbamiwa & Sibomvu	Vungu
4	Jonkola & Ntabanhlope	Vungu
5	Mangwande & Mzila	Vungu
6	Maboleni & Sikombingo	Vungu
7	Madinga & Shagari	Vungu
8	Insukamini & Mkoba	Vungu
9	Conemara & St Patricks	Chiwundura
10	Gambiza	Chiwundura
11	Masvori & Gumbure	Chiwundura
12	Gunde & Zviseko	Chiwundura
13	Budhe & Chikutubwe	Chiwundura
14	Hwahwa, Hozheri & Boulder	Chiwundura
15	Dawson Farm & Somabula	Vungu
16	Insukamini Farm & Stormvale	Chiwundura
17	Lukuluba & Sunrise	Vungu
18	Fletcher & Guinea Fowl	Chiwundura
19	Julena & Vungu	Vungu

== 2013 - 2018 Councillors ==
Source: Zimbabwe Electoral Commission

Ward	Councilor (Alt.)	Gender	Affiliated to	Constituency
#01	Mbusi Ndhlovu	m	ZANU-PF	Vungu
#02	Vile Ncube	m	ZANU-PF	Vungu
#03	Samuel Msipa	m	ZANU-PF	Vungu
#04	Edward Jani	m	MDC-T	Vungu
#05	Ngema A Sibanda	m	ZANU-PF	Vungu
#06	Gift Ncube	m	MDC-T	Vungu
#07	Rhonath Sibanda	m	MDC-T	Vungu
#08	Sipiwe Moyo	f	MDC-T	Vungu
#09	Conrad J Tongogara	m	ZANU-PF	Chiwundura
#10	Resta Muswere	f	MDC-T	Chiwundura
#11	Justin Mushonga	m	ZANU-PF	Chiwundura
#12	Cuthbert Bushe	m	ZANU-PF	Chiwundura
#13	Morgan Zimvu	m	ZANU-PF	Chiwundura
#14	Tendai Marongere	f	ZANU-PF	Chiwundura
#15	Sibongile Matavire	f	ZANU-PF	Vungu
#16	Fredrick Machongwe	m	ZANU-PF	Chiwundura
#17	Angelina Muganyi	f	ZANU-PF	Vungu
#18	Simbarashe Tatisa	m	ZANU-PF	Chiwundura
#19	Nsuku Masotsha	m	ZANU-PF	Vungu

== 2008-2023 Councillors ==
Source: Kubatana Aechive

Ward	Councilor (Alt.)	Gender	Affiliated to	Constituency
#01	Dube Mthandazo	m	ZANU-PF	Vungu
#02	Ncube Vile	m	ZANU-PF	Vungu
#03	Msipha Samuel	m	ZANU-PF	Vungu
#04	Jani Edward	m	MDC-T	Vungu
#05	Sibanda Ngema Another	m	ZANU-PF	Vungu
#06	Genga Msongelwa Gidiyon	m	MDC-T	Vungu
#07	Sibanda Rhonath	m	MDC-T	Vungu
#08	Ngulube Siphiwe	f	MDC-T	Vungu
#09	Charamba Celton	m	ZANU-PF	Chiwundura
#10	Tsure Simbarashe	m	MDC-T	Chiwundura
#11	Majoni Concilia	f	ZANU-PF	Chiwundura
#12	Chikwavaire Elias Amos	m	MDC-T	Chiwundura
#13	Zimvu Morgen	m	ZANU-PF	Chiwundura
#14	Marongere Tendai	f	ZANU-PF	Chiwundura
#15	Moyo Emily Wazanai	f	ZANU-PF	Vungu
#16	Towe Annah	f	ZANU-PF	Chiwundura
#18	Bwanali Senzeni Vareria	f	ZANU-PF	Chiwundura
#19	Ncube Thompson	m	ZANU-PF	Vungu

== See also ==
- Gweru District
- Zibagwe RDC
- Takawira RDC
- Midlands Province
