= Gokwe South Rural District Council =

Coordinates: 18.2172°S 28.9422°E

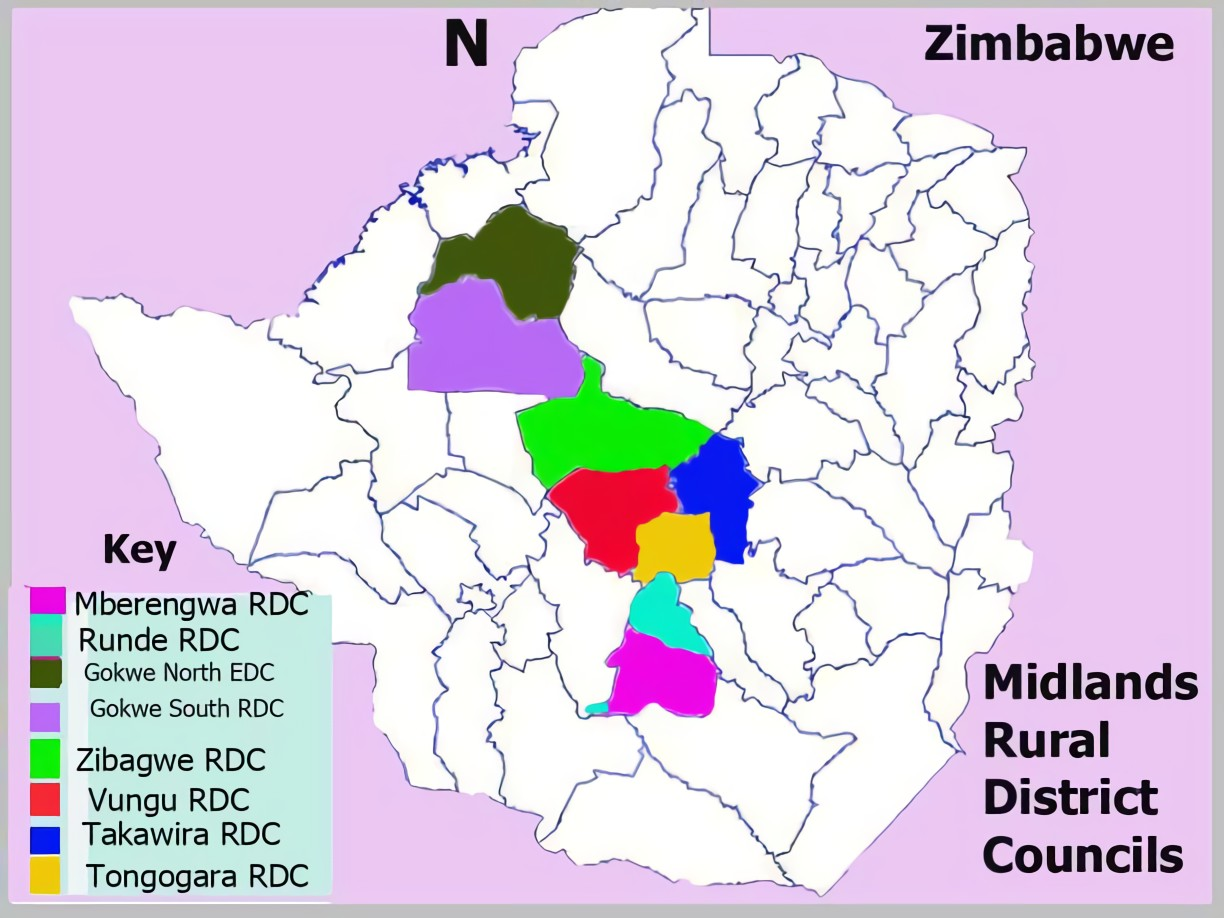
Midlands RDCs

Gokwe South Rural District Council is the rural district local authority in Gokwe South District. Gokwe South District has two local government arms, Gokwe Town Council created under the Zimbabwe Urban Councils Act, Chapter 29.15 administering Gokwe Urban, and Gokwe RDC created in terms of the Zimbabwe Rural District Councils Act, Chapter 29.13 overseeing the rural Gokwe South District in Zimbabwe.

== Operations ==
Gokwe South RDC comprises 33 rural wards in 5 constituencies;

- Gokwe 4 wards,
- Sasame 7 wards,
- Kana 8 wards,
- Mapfungautsi 7 wards,
- Sengwa 7 wards

== 2013 - 2018 Councillors ==
Source: Zimbabwe Electoral Commission

Ward	Councillor	Gender	Party	Constituency
#01	Ernest Samson	-	ZANU-PF	Kana
#02	Ruzive A Gave	m	ZANU-PF	Kana
#03	Farai Kwirirai	m	ZANU-PF	Sengwa
#04	John Chinhengo	m	ZANU-PF	Sengwa
#05	Doubt Imbayago	m	ZANU-PF	Sengwa
#06	Amon Karikoga	m	ZANU-PF	Gokwe-Sengwa
#07	Ignatia Chingwendere	f	ZANU-PF	Sasame
#08	Munashe Mhuka	m	ZANU-PF	Sengwa
#09	Elliot Magodhi	m	ZANU-PF	Sasame
#10	Erien Ngwenya	m	ZANU-PF	Sasame
#11	Moffat Madina	m	ZANU-PF	Sasame
#12	Masara Mashedzamwa	m	ZANU-PF	Sasame
#13	Albert Pasura	m	ZANU-PF	Sasame
#14	Peter Tinago	m	ZANU-PF	Mapfungautsi
#15	Musa Musara	m	ZANU-PF	Gokwe
#16	Nicholas Nyathi	m	ZANU-PF	Mapfungautsi
#17	Jameson Sibanda	m	MDC-T	Sasame
#18	Tawanda Ruganda	m	ZANU-PF	Sengwa
#19	Andrew Mateta	m	ZANU-PF	Gokwe
#20	Better C Madzura	m	ZANU-PF	Gokwe
#21	Simon Mafaza	m	ZANU-PF	Kana
#22	Wellington Makuvazvivi	m	ZANU-PF	Kana
#23	Peter Chipato	m	ZANU-PF	Mapfungautsi
#24	Rodgers Yakobe	m	ZANU-PF	Mapfungautsi
#25	Shungu Maruza	m	ZANU-PF	Mapfungautsi
#26	Zhangazha Chibwana	m	ZANU-PF	Kana
#27	Sipilanzima Chuma	m	ZANU-PF	Kana
#28	Beauty Ncube	f	ZANU-PF	Mapfungautsi
#29	Moses Chifamba	m	ZANU-PF	Kana
#30	Cephas Sibanda	m	ZANU-PF	Kana
#31	Shadreck Magaya	m	MDC-T	Sengwa
#32	Isaac Gana	m	ZANU-PF	Gokwe
#33	Talent Mudyahoto	-	ZANU-PF	Mapfungautsi

== 2008 - 2013 Councillors ==
Source: Kubatana Aechive

Ward	Councillor	Gender	Party	Constituency
#01	Baleni Eusebia Sylivia	f	ZANU-PF	Kana
#02	Nkosana Elizabeth	f	ZANU-PF	Kana
#03	Kwirirai Farai	m	ZANU-PF	Sengwa
#04	Sai Gideon	m	ZANU-PF	Sengwa
#05	Tongovona Ellah	f	ZANU-PF	Sengwa
#06	Karikoga Amon	m	ZANU-PF	Gokwe
#07	Chigwedere Ignatia	-	ZANU-PF	Sasame
#08	Ncube Nokuthula	-	MDC-T	Sasame
#09	Magodhi Elliot	m	ZANU-PF	Sasame
#10	Ngwenya Erian	-	ZANU-PF	Sasame
#11	Ndhela Smarks	m	MDC-T	Sasame
#12	Mashedzamwa Masara	-	ZANU-PF	Sasame
#13	Mhloro Sikonzile Machona	f	ZANU-PF	Sasame
#14	Serengwa Tayizoni	m	ZANU-PF	Mapfungautsi
#15	Nyamazana Nyowani	m	MDC-T	Gokwe
#16	Chinyama Orbert	m	ZANU-PF	Mapfungautsi
#17	Sibanda Jameson	m	MDC-T	Sasame
#18	Sithole Sipeto	m	ZANU-PF	Sengwa
#19	Mateta Andrew	m	ZANU-PF	Gokwe
#20	Madzura Better Clayton	m	ZANU-PF	Gokwe
#21	-	-	-	Kana
#22	Makuvazvivi Wellington	m	ZANU-PF	Kana
#23	Dube Caritas	-	ZANU-PF	Mapfungautsi
#24	Mpofu Revision	m	ZANU-PF	Mapfungautsi
#25	Mazarire Farayi Phibeon	m	MDC-T	Mapfungautsi
#26	Chibwana Zhangazha	m	ZANU-PF	Kana
#27	Gwenhamo Richard	m	MDC-T	Kana
#28	Nyathi Luckyford	m	MDC-T	Mapfungautsi
#29	Tasaranago Jobe Dube	m	MDC-T	Kana
#30	Dube Laiza	m	MDC-T	Kana
#31	Moyo Stephen	m	ZANU-PF	Sengwa
#32	Gana Isaac	m	ZANU-PF	Gokwe
#33	Gunde Mebuli	m	ZANU-PF	Mapfungautsi

== See also ==
- Gokwe South District
- Gokwe North RDC
- Gokwe Town
- Kwekwe District
