= Mberengwa District =

Coordinates: 20°29′S 29°55′E

- administrative district
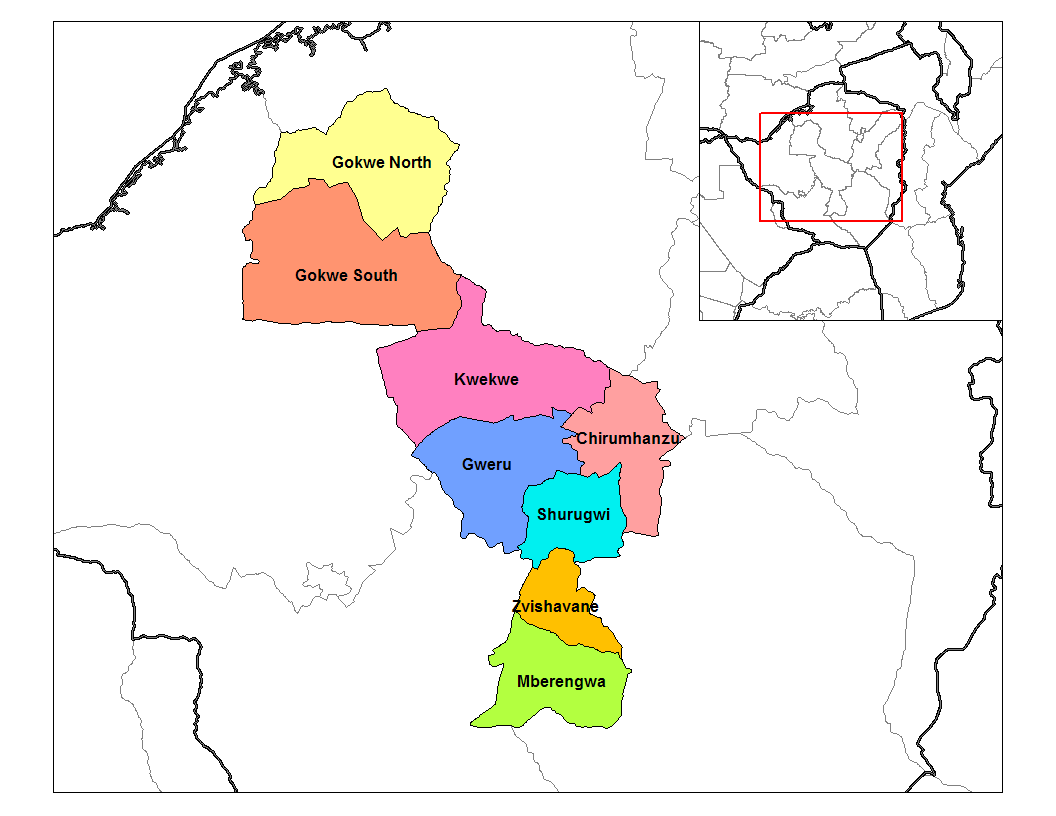
- Mberengwa District in the Midlands
- Country: Zimbabwe
- Province: Midlands

Area
  - Total: 5,066 km^{2} (1,956 sq mi)

Population (2022)
  - Total: 208,458
- Time zone: UTC+2 (CAT)

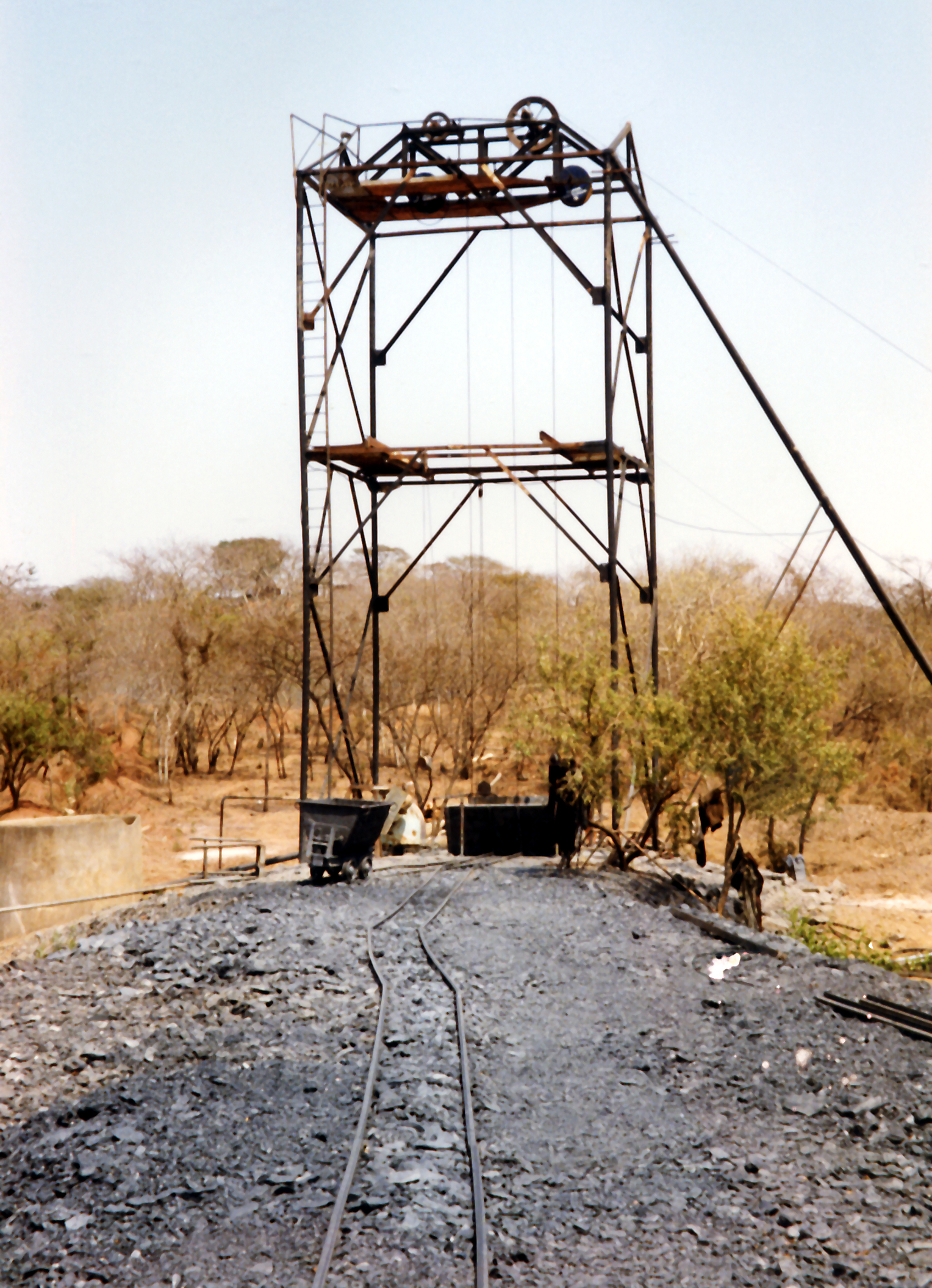
Agincourt Mine in Mberengwa

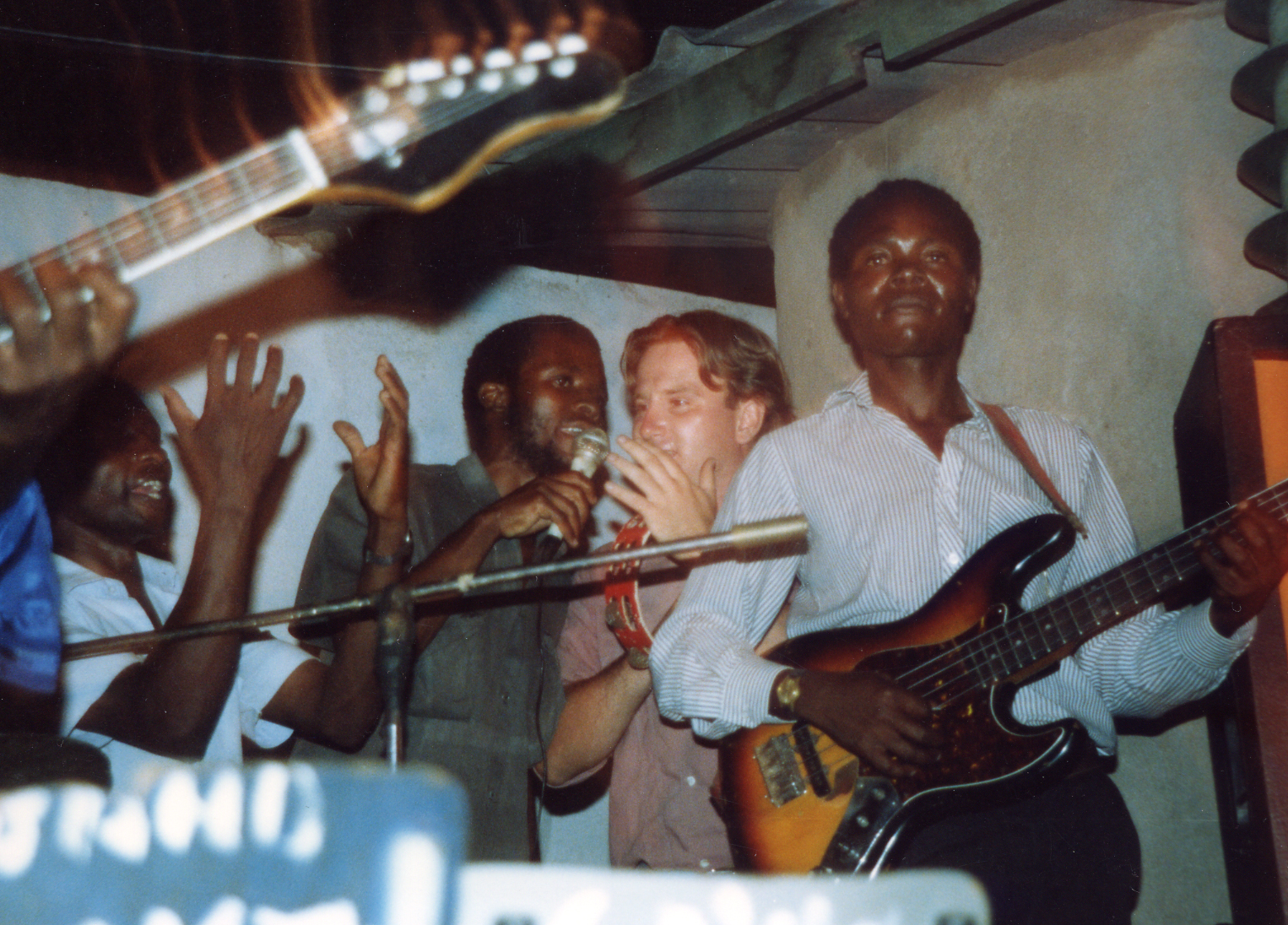
Musicians playing Zimbabwean pop music in Danga, 2005

Mberengwa, originally known as Belingwe, is a district in Midlands province in Zimbabwe. The district is now divided into sub-districts: Mberengwa Central, East, and West. Gwanda bounds it in Mberengwa west, and by Zvishavane in its northern zone, to the south it stretches to Neshuro, Chikombedzi, and is bounded by Manyuchi dam.

== Local government ==
Mberengwa Rural District Council is the local authority over Mberengwa District. The district comprises 3 parliamentary constituencies with a total of 37 elected councillors and 11 councillors from women's quarter to make a total of 48 councillors overseeing 37 wards. The wards are distributed as follows;

- Mberengwa-East Constituency has 12 wards:

3, 4, 5, 6, 7, 8, 18, 19, 20, 21, 22, and 23.

- Mberengwa-West Constituency has 12 wards:

1, 11, 12, 13, 14, 29, 30, 31, 32, 33, 34, and 36.

- Mberengwa-Central Constituency has 13 wards:

2, 9, 10, 15, 16, 17, 24, 25, 26, 27, 28, 35, and 37.

== Background ==
The name "Mberengwa" itself comes from the Karanga (Southern Shona) phrase Mbere-yeingwa. The other plausible theory about the meaning of Mberengwa is 'verengwa' which is an act of census believed to have been conducted by the Lemba people stationed at Mount Mberengwa after a terrible plague. Clans that had been counted and accounted for became Mberengwa. After the census various clans of the Lemba migrated to different parts of the district including Thohoyandou in Venda, South Africa. This name is still used as a clan name by the Hadji tribe of the Lemba (Mzezewas) still stationed near the mountain. The Hadji clan in South Africa also uses Mbelengwa (with an 'L'from their local Venda language) to describe themselves. Mount Mberengwa is one of the highest mountains in Zimbabwe, but not as high as the mountains in the Eastern Highlands. Pre-Independence in 1980, the mountain and district was also called Belingwe which was a colonial adulteration of Mberengwa.

The indigenous languages spoken in Mberengwa are mainly Karanga and Ndebele. Pfumbi, a variation of Karanga which is also close to Kalanga (Western Shona), has also been spoken in chief Muketi areas. The Pfumbi quickly assimilated into the Karanga and most of them crossed Mwenezi river and settled in the Maranda and Shayamavhudzi areas in southern Masvingo. It is thought that Pfumbi used to be more widespread than this in the past before the onset of Standard Shona as the compulsory vernacular language to be taught in schools. One name which retains a trace of that past up to now is Mupandashango school, which in the Standard Shona form of today would be Mupandasango. It is possible to meet people called Mashango (Masango) The use of words with velar fricatives, once represented by the letter "x", but now abandoned by orthography since the 1956 Samukange-led standardization of Shona, is another example that clearly and closely links the Karanga of Mberengwa with Kalanga with which it used to relate in places west of the current district as well as in the Gwanda West Nicholson area where the Jaunda version of Kalanga used to abound, and in Mwenezi. These are words like "xwera, xare, xwitaidza". Many areas of Zvishavane share a lot in common with the Karanga language spoken in Mberengwa. Generally, Standard Shona can be considered to be foreign to the Mberengwa area. Many Ndebele speakers were settled in the Mberengwa district throughout the 1900s, on their own accord or because of colonial government relocations meant to pave way for White farms and mines in their areas of original settlement such as the De Beers ranch and other places in the Somabula and Shangani areas. Because of these new arrivals, Ndebele words are used freely in Mberengwa's Karanga, which is a natural process of borrowing and adaptation among closely settled and interacting peoples. In Mashonaland where immigrant workers of Malawian origin were found in numbers, Zezuru (Central Shona) borrowed and adapted words like "tsano, kabanga, wondonga" etc. n.b. A lot of words were brought in from Karanga, Zezuru, Korekore, Ndau, Manyika and utilized there. Examples are "dhuku (doek), bhurukwa (broek), jon'hosi (from Afrikaans for [young ox])" and others. As in Kalanga, the use of "l" in words like "dla" or "tla" (to eat, to fear) is part of the Karanga language and not a borrowing from the Ndebele language, evidently such uses are also common in Masvingo where Ndebele influences are little.

The other tribe that forms the great party of Mberengwa is the Shoko clan. It has four families that share the mapiravana chieftainship namely Wadawareva, manonose, Sukira and Makonese. The current chief is called Rungano.

== Operations ==
The district is prone to droughts and high temperatures, but abundant in minerals like gold, iron ore, emeralds and asbestos. Buchwa Mine, Vanguard Mine, Sandawana and C Mine are all in Mberengwa.

It is known for its riches in minerals and fauna. Gold is mined at C Mine and other small claims mines scattered around Mberengwa. Emeralds are mined at the Sandawana mines, while Vanguard Mine was once a major player in asbestos production until the 1980s when its use declined as asbestos was convincingly identified as a lung and cancer hazard. Chrome was mined at Rhonda and Inyala mines, but these closed down due to the disastrous effects of the Zimbabwean crisis and Zimbabwe's liberation struggle. Cattle ranching is a major farming activity.

Mataga growth point, is the centre which provides goods and services to the rural population of mberengwa. Mataga growth point is where the creation of balanced socio-economic developments of Mataga occurs. Most micro-level planning for Mberengwa occurs here.

== Education ==
The district has a number of missionary-run schools that run up to A-Level, notably Chegato and Musume, Masase and Mnene. After 1980, the government constructed a number of rural day secondary schools also known as "Upper Tops" among them Guruva, Chovuragu, Bubwe, Zvamagwiro, Mabika, Maringambizi, Mbuya Nehanda, Bayayi, Murerezi, Chegute, Svita, Chizungu, Madenyika, Sviba, Makuva, Funye, Vuronga, Mposi, Ruzengwe, Chingoma, Vutsanana, Zvomukonde, Chemimwe, Vutika, Rengwe and Chomusenda. They have helped improve the education standards as well as creating education opportunities for many rural children. There are missionary-run hospitals and clinics. Most of the schools and hospitals are run by the Evangelical Lutheran Church in Zimbabwe. Non-governmental organizations like CARE have or had had programs operating there as well.

== Sports ==
Primary and secondary schools in Mberengwa compete yearly in football tournaments. There is a trophy won, originally funded by the Coca-Cola Company. Soccer is the most favored sport in the district.

Apart from soccer, gollball is also a popular sport for visually impaired school children. Over the years basketball has gained momentum especially amongst high schools. Mission schools under the Evangelical Lutheran Church compete in the E L C Z sports tournament which are held yearly. They are rotated amongst the schools. Sporting activities such as soccer, netball, basketball, volleyball, etc. are competed. One year focuses on track events then the next year focuses on field events.

== See also ==
- Mberengwa RDC
