= Runde Rural District Council =

Coordinates: 20.3153°S 30.0537°E

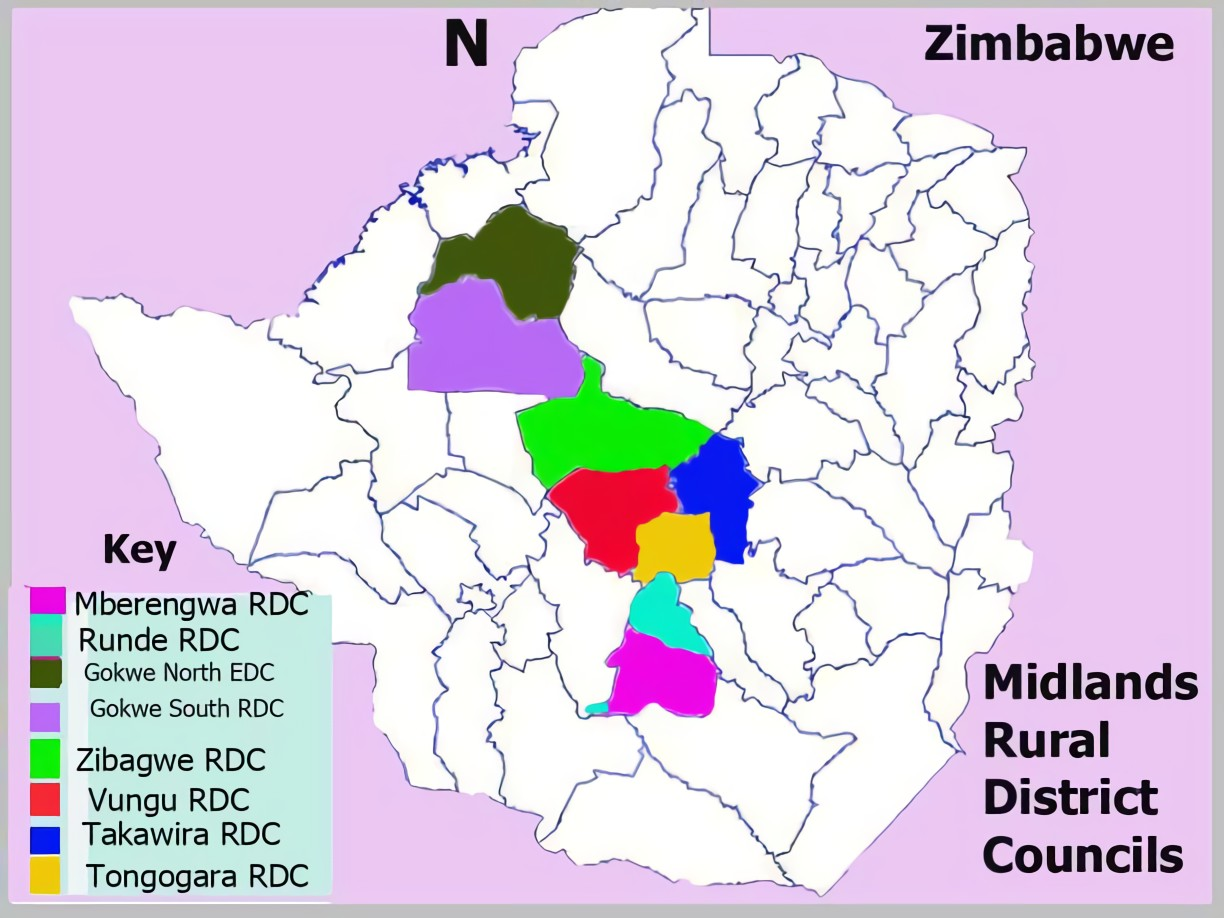
Midlands RDCs

Runde Rural District Council is Zvishavane Rural District local government arm taking care of the rural district while Zvishavane Town Council administers the urban district.

Zvishavane District has two local government arms, Zvishavane Town Council created under the Zimbabwe Urban Councils Act, Chapter 29.15 and Runde RDC created in terms of the Zimbabwe Rural District Councils Act, Chapter 29.13.

== Background ==
Runde RDC is one of the 8 rural district councils in the Midlands Province of Zimbabwe.

Its name derives from Runde River.

It comprises Zvishavane-Ngezi and Zvishavane-Runde.

- Zvishavane-Ngezi has wards 3 5 6 11 12 and 19.
- Zvishavane-Runde has wards 1 2 4 7 8 9 10 13 14 15 16 17 and 18.

== 2013 - 2018 Councillors ==
All councillors in this term are from ZANU-PF.

Source: Zimbabwe Electoral Commission

Ward	Councillor	Gender	Constituency
#01	Mavis Mahuvava	f	Zvishavane-Runde
#02	Jameson Chikozho	m	Zvishavane-Runde
#03	Martin Mapfumo	m	Zvishavane-Ngezi
#04	Beatrice Mutare	f	Zvishavane-Runde
#05	Norman Sibanda	m	Zvishavane-Ngezi
#06	Nomore Nyoni	m	Zvishavane-Ngezi
#07	Peter Jonasi	m	Zvishavane-Runde
#08	Manuel Msipa	m	Zvishavane-Runde
#09	Peter Nyaya	m	Zvishavane-Runde
#10	Talita Nyahondo	f	Zvishavane-Runde
#11	Manuel Mpofu	m	Zvishavane-Ngezi
#12	Twoboy Moyo	m	Zvishavane-Ngezi
#13	Morgan Msipa	m	Zvishavane-Runde
#14	Evelyn Mupama	f	Zvishavane-Runde
#15	Muziyabo Singwango	m	Zvishavane-Runde
#16	Trechias Manhibi	f	Zvishavane-Runde
#17	Marvellous Hove	m	Zvishavane-Runde
#18	Jacob Mvuto	m	Zvishavane-Runde
#19	Doctor M Siziba	m	Zvishavane-Ngezi

Zimbabwe Rural District Councils Act; Chapter 29.13.

Zimbabwe Urban Councils Act, Chapter 29.15

== 2008 - 2013 Coincillors ==
All councillors in this term were from ZANU-PF

Source: Kubatana Aechive

Ward	Councillor	Gender	Constituency
#02	Chikozho Jameson	m	Zvishavane-Runde
#04	Mutare Beatrice	f	Zvishavane-Runde
#05	Sibanda Norman	m	Zvishavane-Ngezi
#06	Mukhonto Abraham	m	Zvishavane-Ngezi
#07	Jonas Peter	m	Zvishavane-Runde
#10	Nyahondo Talita	f	Zvishavane-Runde
#11	Mpofu Manuel	m	Zvishavane-Ngezi
#12	Moyo Twoboy	m	Zvishavane-Ngezi
#13	Gore Rachel	f	Zvishavane-Runde
#14	Mupama Evelyn	f	Zvishavane-Runde
#15	Sithole Titus	m	Zvishavane-Runde
#16	Ngwenya Vonai	f	Zvishavane-Runde
#17	Hove Marvellous	m	Zvishavane-Runde
#18	Mvuto Jacob	m	Zvishavane-Runde
#19	Hove Langton	m	Zvishavane-Ngezi

== See also ==
- Zvishavane District
