= List of museums in Zimbabwe =

Many Zimbabwean museums are administered by the National Museums and Monuments of Zimbabwe (a Zimbabwean government parastatal). They all open between 9:00 AM and 5:00 PM and are open every day except on Good Friday and Christmas Day. They are open to everyone, and a fee may be charged depending with whether you are a local resident or a non-resident and on whether you are a child or an adult. Below is a list of museums in Zimbabwe.

== List ==
Name	Location	Province	Type	Entrance Fees (RTGS$)	Summary
Bulawayo Railway Museum	Crew Road, Bulawayo	Bulawayo	Railway	Locals Adults - 2	The museum showcases the history of rail transport in Zimbabwe. Its exhibits, the oldest of which dates to 1897, includes Cecil Rhodes' personal rail coach.
Discovereum	18399 Hillside Road Extension, Msasa Harare	Harare	Children's		Opened in 2016, the Discovereum is the first children's museum in Zimbabwe. The museum includes interactive exhibits suited to children.
EAG Art Museum	off Robert Mugabe St, Masvingo	Masvingo	Art	Adults -2	The EAG Art Museum is an art museum in Masvingo.
First Floor Gallery Harare	Harare	Harare	Art		The First Floor Gallery is an artist-run gallery of contemporary art featuring the work of young emerging artists established in 2009.
Gallery Delta	Harare	Harare	Art		Founded in 1975, the gallery features local contemporary art, particularly paintings, graphics, textiles, and ceramics. It is located in an 1894 house, previously a private residence, that is one of the oldest structures in Harare.
Great Zimbabwe Museum	Great Zimbabwe	Masvingo	Archaeology	Locals Adults - 5 Children - 3 Foreigners Adults - 15 Children - 8	The museum contains information related to Great Zimbabwe, an Iron Age ruin and one of the best-known sites in Zimbabwe.
Joshua Nkomo Museum	17 Aberdeen Road, Matsheumhlophe, Bulawayo	Bulawayo	Historic house		The former home of Joshua Nkomo, Zimbabwean revolutionary leader and politician. It is a National Monument of Zimbabwe.
Jafuta Heritage Center	Victoria Falls	Matabeleland North	Local		The Jafuta Heritage Center showcases a collection of artifacts relating to local history, as well as a small library containing historical books and records about the region.
Kambako Living Museum	Chiredzi District	Masvingo	Local		Kambako is a living museum focusing on the culture of the local Shangaan people.
Mutare Museum	Mutare	Manicaland	Local	Locals Adults - 4 Children - 1 Foreigners Adults - 10 Children - 5	The Mutare Museum, opened in 1957, was the first museum in Mutare. Its diverse collection includes natural history displays, geological collections, archaeological and ethnological artifacts, and historic furniture, weapons, and automobiles.
National Gallery of Zimbabwe	Harare	Harare	Art		The National Gallery, which was officially opened in 1957 by Queen Elizabeth The Queen Mother, exhibits contemporary art and includes an extensive collection of Shona sculpture.
National Gallery of Zimbabwe in Bulawayo	Bulawayo	Bulawayo	Art		Located in a historic building behind the Bulawayo City Hall, the museum opened in 1970 as the National Gallery of Zimbabwe's first branch outside the main gallery in Harare.
National Gallery of Zimbabwe in Mutare	Mutare	Manicaland	Art		Located in Kopje House, an 1897 building that originally served as Mutare's first hospital, the museum is the Mutare branch of the National Gallery of Zimbabwe. The museum displays art on loan from the main gallery in Harare, as well as works by local artists.
National Mining Museum	Kwekwe	Midlands	Mining		One of five national museums nationwide, the National Mining Museum showcases the history of the mining industry of Zimbabwe. It is the only museum in Kwekwe and the only mining museum in Zimbabwe.
Natural History Museum of Zimbabwe	Bulawayo	Bulawayo	Natural history	Locals Adults - 3 Children - 2 Foreigners Adults - 10 Children - 5	The Natural History Museum, opened in 1964, contains exhibits illustrating the history, mineral wealth and wildlife of Zimbabwe, including the second largest mounted elephant in the world.
Rhodes Nyanga Historical Exhibition	Nyanga	Manicaland	Historic house	Adults – $2 Children - 50c	The former home of businessman and imperialist Cecil Rhodes. It is the only museum in Nyanga.
Utopia House	11 Jason Moyo Drive, Mutare	Manicaland	Historic house		The oldest modern home in Mutare and the former home of Rhys Fairbridge, an early white pioneer who surveyed the Mutare area. It is a National Monument of Zimbabwe.
Zimbabwe Military Museum	Gweru	Midlands	Military	Locals Adults - 4 Children - 1 Foreigners Adults - 10 Children - 5	One of five national museums nationwide, the Zimbabwe Military Museum showcases the history of the Zimbabwe Defence Forces. It is the only museum in Gweru and the only military museum in Zimbabwe
Zimbabwe Museum of Human Sciences	Harare	Harare	Archeological	Locals Adults - 3 Children - 1 Foreigners Adults - 10 Children - 5	The Museum of Human Sciences includes ethnographic and archaeological collections, alongside wildlife exhibits, a model Shona village, and a library. Its most notable holding is a 700 year old Lemba artifact thought to be a replica of the Ark of the Covenant, and the oldest wooden object ever found in Sub-Saharan Africa.
Paper House	Kwekwe	Kwekwe	Historic House	Locals Adults - Free Children - Free Foreigners Adults - Free Children - Free	It was built for Globe and Phoenix mine manager, Mr H.A. Piper. The paper house is a prefabricated two-bedroom dwelling built on wooden stilts since 1894. It was later used as his office after being succeeded by the Phoenix House in Gaika Park.
Old Bulawayo		Bulawayo	Community Museum	Locals Adults - Free Children - Free Foreigners Adults - Free Children - Free	Old Bulawayo was established in 1990 but the site was originally established by King Lobengula as his capital in 1870 soon after becoming king of the Matebele people.
Aviation	Lobengula Street, Gweru	Gweru	Aviation	Locals Adults - Children - Foreigners Adults - Children -	
Landa Nkomo Museum	Corner Joshua Mqabuko Nkomo Street and 12th Avenue, Bulawayo	Bulawayo			Documents the life of the late Vice President. It has portraits of Zimbabwean former presidents and vice presidents. The museum was set up by the John Landa Nkomo Memorial Trust.

== See also ==
- List of museums
