= Utopia House =

- Location in Zimbabwe
- Location: 11 Jason Moyo Drive; Mutare, Manicaland, Zimbabwe
- Coordinates: 18.9584°S 32.6765°E
- Type: Historic house museum

Utopia House is a historic house museum in Mutare, Zimbabwe. The house, constructed in 1897, was the first modern house built in Mutare. It was originally the home of Rhys Fairbridge, one of the earliest white settlers in the area. The house's interior has been restored to what it would have looked like in the 1910s, including some original furniture and Fairbridge family possessions. Along with the Mutare Museum, Utopia House is one of two museums in Mutare and is a National Monument of Zimbabwe.

== Location ==
Utopia House is located in Mutare's low density Murambi suburb, about two miles from the city centre, and around two kilometers away from the Mutare Museum. The museum's street address is 11 Jason Moyo Drive, across the street from St. Dominic's High School.

== History ==
Utopia House was built in 1897 as the home of Rhys and Rosalie Fairbridge. Rhys Fairbridge, a white South African, arrived in Manicaland in the early 1890s to work as a British South Africa Company surveyor. He surveyed the land now comprising the city of Mutare and surrounding areas. In 1897, he constructed a new home for him and his wife, named "Utopia" and built on one of the best sites he had come across while surveying. He first built the home's stone walls four feet tall, before temporarily stopping construction due to lack of funds as well as anticipation of the coming rainy season. He positioned supporting poles around the incomplete walls, filled in the gaps with reed mats, and constructed a thatched roof overhead. He later finished constructing the home using local materials, with the exception of corrugated iron roofing, doors, and windows, which he imported from South Africa. It was the first "modern" or European-style house constructed in Mutare.

== Description ==
Utopia House is a historic house museum and a National Monument of Zimbabwe. It is under the care of the National Museums and Monuments of Zimbabwe, and is curated by the staff of the Mutare Museum. Utopia House and the Mutare Museum are the only two museums in Mutare, the fourth-largest city in Zimbabwe.

The museum was restored to how it would have looked as a private home during the 1910–20 period. Many of the Fairbridges' original furniture and possessions were preserved and remain on display inside the home. Along with its collection of historical artifacts, the museum campus includes gardens and a theater. The Phoenix Theater holds periodic plays, while the gardens are home to a statue of Kingsley Ogilvie Fairbridge, a poet and educator and Rhys Fairbridge's son. The statue was unveiled on 8 July 1953 by Queen Elizabeth The Queen Mother at the summit of Christmas Pass, and was moved to the gardens of Utopia House in 1982.

== See also ==
- List of museums in Zimbabwe
