= Sebakwe Dam =

- Location in Zimbabwe
- Location: Kwekwe District, Zimbabwe
- Coordinates: 19°00′48″S 30°12′03″E
- Purpose: Irrigation/Water supply
- Construction began: 1956
- Opening date: 1957
- Owner: Ministry of Water Resources and Development (Zimbabwe)
- Operator: ZINWA

Dam and spillways
- Type of dam: Earth-filled Embankment Dam
- Impounds: Sebakwe River
- Height (foundation): 47 m
- Length: 8 km (5.0 mi)
- Width (crest): 2.5 km
- Dam volume: 266 million cubic metres

Reservoir
- Surface area: 2 320 hectares

Sebakwe Dam is a dam in the Midlands Province of Zimbabwe. It was built in 1957 and owned by the Zimbabwe government. It is across Sebakwe River in the Sanyati Catchment Area.

It has a full capacity of 266 megalitres which makes it one of the largest inland dams of Zimbabwe. It is 8 kilometres long and its maximum width is 2.5 kilometres; The surface area is 2320 hectares; Its wall is 47 m high and 3 km long.

== Background ==
It was built as a small dam in 1957 and was raised 1986.

In 1957 Sebakwe Dam was the second largest dam in Southern Rhodesia. Its height then was 154 feet high (47 meters). covering an area of 9 square miles (2320 ha) with a capacity of 35 billion imperial gallons.

== Operations ==
It supplies water to Kwekwe and Redcliff, and for irrigation.

== See also ==
- Sebakwe River
- Globe and Phoenix Mine
- Gaika Mine
- Kwekwe
