= Buffaloes F.C. =

Zimbabwean football club

Buffaloes
- Full name: Buffaloes Football Club
- Ground: Sakubva Stadium, Mutare, Zimbabwea
- Capacity: 10,000
- Chairman: Hlanganiso Matangaidze
- Manager: Timothy Masachi
- League: Zimbabwe Premier Soccer League
- 2013: 12

Buffaloes F.C. are a Zimbabwean football club based in Mutare. They play in the top division of Zimbabwean football, the Zimbabwe Premier Soccer League.

== League participations ==
- Zimbabwe Premier Soccer League: 2012–
- Zimbabwean Second Division: ?-2012

== Stadium ==
Currently the team plays at the 10000 capacity Sakubva Stadium.
