= Chicago, Zimbabwe =

Low density suburb in Kwekwe, Zimbabwe

Coordinates: 18.9488°S 29.8032°E

Chicago is a low density suburb located in the city of Kwekwe in Zimbabwe, just beside Kwekwe CBD in the southern parts.

== Background ==
Chicago is one of the oldest place names in Kwekwe.

The suburb is situated in South of the CBD along the A5 Highway and in a hilly environment.

The area was originally the east-end of a farm by the same name, covering the better part of Kwekwe Central, Feachlea, Hellandale and beyond. Gaika Mine also known as Chicago Gaika Mine is wholly in former Chicago Farm. The first plots in Kwekwe were pegged in Chicago. It was not considered the area for the rich elite the tag it carries today.

Chicago is one of the most prominent low density suburban settlements in Kwekwe. Chicago Farm still exists, partly though, Southwest of Kwekwe.

Chicago's fame started way back in when "Gaika Concession Store" owners Barney and Dora Kahn imported the first Cadillac into the country.

== Politics ==
Chicago is within Kwekwe Central Constituency.

== Local Government ==
Chicago falls under Kwekwe Municipality as one of the settlements within its jurisdiction.

== See also ==
- Kwekwe
- Globe and Phoenix Mine
- Gaika Mine
