= Hardrock F.C. =

Association football club in Zimbabwe

- Founded: 2019
- Ground: Chahwanda Stadium
- Capacity: 15,000
- Coach: Kelvin Kaindu
- League: Zimbabwe Premier Soccer League (ZPSL)
- 2025: 1st (champions, Zimbabwe Central Region)

Hardrock F.C. is a professional football club from Kwekwe that competes in the Zimbabwe Premier Soccer League (ZPSL).

== History ==
Hardrock was founded in 2019 by Shepherd 'Magodora' Chahwanda, a mining magnate from Kwekwe.

The club was promoted to the ZPSL after winning the 2025 Central Region. As of 2026, it plays in the newly built Chahwanda Stadium. They made some big signings prior to the start of their first PSL season, including 2025 PSL Soccer Star of the Year and Golden Boot winner, Washington Navaya.

== Honours ==
- Central Region
  - Champions (1): 2025
