= Ingama =

Ingama is a village about 20 km south west of the present day Bulawayo, the second largest city of Zimbabwe. It is the site where Mzilikazi died in 1868. Ingama is about 5 km to the north of Old Bulawayo, Lobengula's last royal residence.
