= Kwekwe General Hospital =

Coordinates: 18.9363°S 29.8243°E

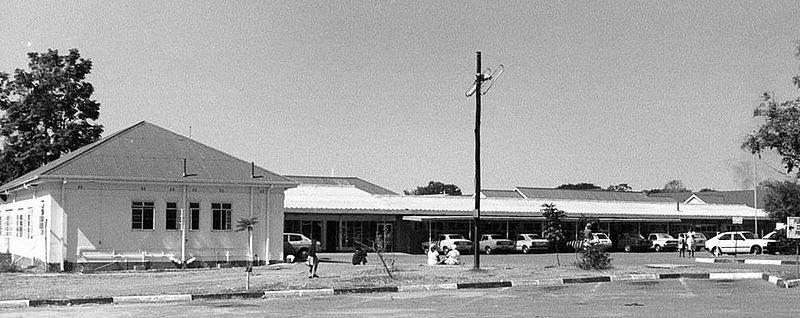
- Kwekwe General Hospital, Kwekwe.

Geography
- Location: Kwekwe, Zimbabwe

Organisation
- Type: Teaching & Referral
- Affiliated university: Ministry of Health and Child Care

History
- Opened: c. 1900

Links
- Lists: Hospitals in Zimbabwe

Kwekwe General Hospital is the main referral hospital within Kwekwe District plus the nearby Zhombe District. It is a government-run institution in which the Kwekwe City Council has overall oversight. The hospital is one of a number in the Midlands Province offering free anti-retroviral therapy to people with HIV/AIDS. It services HIV/AIDS patients from across the whole Kwekwe District plus those from neighboring districts like Gokwe.

== See also ==
- Kwekwe
- Mbizo
