= National Mining Museum =

National Mining Museum may refer to museums in a variety of countries, including:

- Big Pit National Coal Museum (Originally the National Mining Museum of Wales)
- National Coal Mining Museum for England
- National Mining Museum Scotland
- National Mining Museum, Luxembourg
- National Mining Museum, Zimbabwe
