= Baghdad Stadium =

Multi-use stadium in Kwekwe, Zimbabwe

- Interactive map of Baghdad Stadium
- Location: Kwekwe, Zimbabwe
- Coordinates: 18.916280°S 29.825019°E
- Owner: Kwekwe City Council
- Capacity: 5000
- Surface: Grass

Construction
- Opened: 1995

Tenant
- Lancashire Steel FC

Baghdad Stadium is a multi-use stadium in Kwekwe, Zimbabwe. It is currently used mostly for football matches and serves as the home stadium for Lancashire Steel. The stadium has a capacity of 5,000 people.

As of 2025, the stadium is in a state of disrepair.

== Location ==
Stadium is located at the heart of the steel industry close to both Lancashire Steel and the works of ZIMASCO. Its proximity of the working suburb of Mbizo, a few miles away, sees it filled to capacity every time Lancashire Steel FC plays league games against the likes of Shabhane Mine, Highlanders FC and Dynamos FC.

== See also ==
- Mbizo Stadium
- Rufaro Stadium
