= Amaveni =

Suburb in Kwekwe, Zimbabwe

Coordinates: 18.925085°S 29.780241°E

Amaveni is a high-density suburb in Kwekwe, Zimbabwe. It is about 5 kilometres (3 mi) west of the city's central business district.

== History ==
Amaveni is one of the oldest suburbs or townships in Zimbabwe. It was established at the beginning of the 20th century by the Southern Rhodesian colonial authorities as a racially segregated dormitory township for African male labourers. Most of these labourers worked as house servants for white families in the nearby suburbs of Fitchlea, Newtown, Masasa Park and Hillandale or in the newly established shops and factories. Some of the residents also worked for the nearby gold mines of Globe and Phoenix, Gaika and Riverlea, particularly those who could not be housed at the mine workers' compounds. Some of the first buildings in Amaveni were the hostels for male labourers (currently being used as the youth centre, Rugare Old People's Home and informal sector workshops).

The township's name, according to one of its first residents, Jonas Macela Nkomo (1908–2002), was derived from an Ndebele army's battalion called Amaveni. The battalion fought during the 1893 Anglo-Ndebele war in the Matebeleland region of Zimbabwe.

== Demographics ==
Today Amaveni's population is made up of people from different professional backgrounds: civil servants, workers from the heavy industries of Zimbabwe Iron and Smelting Company (ZIMASCO), Zimbabwe Iron and Steel Company (ZISCO [now NewZim Steel]), Lancashire Steel, Sable Chemicals, Haggie Rand Zimbabwe, and National Breweries, among other industries. A large proportion of the residents are engaged in the informal sector, mainly fruit and vegetable vending as well as informal gold mining.

== Facilities and transport ==
The main bus terminus for the city of Kwekwe is located in the suburb opposite the Batanai tavern. There has been one main shopping centre till 2002 when another one was established at the 'Superette' in the W section of the township.

There are three primary schools, namely Amaveni Primary School, Kushinga Primary School and St Martin's Primary School. Only one high school exists, Amaveni High School.

Amaveni High school is the only high school in the suburb.

== Notable residents ==
- Blessing Chebundo MP
- John Phiri (Wankie and national football player; not to be confused with national team footballer John Phiri)
- Rudo Kahanda Netball Coach for Amaveni Girls Netball from 1997 to

1999. Rudo Kahanda
