= Paul Gundani =

Zimbabwean footballer (1966–2015)

Personal information
- Date of birth: 15 March 1966
- Place of birth: Torwood, Zimbabwe
- Date of death: 4 November 2015 (aged 49)
- Position: Left-back

Youth career
- Ziscosteel

Senior career*
Years	Team	Apps	(Gls)
- Ziscosteel
- Stockport County reserves
1993–?	Lancashire Steel		

International career
	Zimbabwe	3	(0)
- * Club domestic league appearances and goals

Paul Gundani (15 March 1966 – 4 November 2015) was a Zimbabwean professional footballer who played as a left-back. He made three appearances for the Zimbabwe national team.

== Career ==
Gundani was born in Torwood, Redcliff. A Ziscosteel F.C. youth product, he made his first-team debut at the age of 17. He joined Lancashire Steel in December 1993.

Gundani was part of the Zimbabwe national team in the 1990s which was referred to as the Dream Team.

He later worked as a secretary general of the Footballers Union of Zimbabwe (FUZ).

== Death ==
Gundani died on 4 November 2015, at the age of 49.
