= Peta Teanet =

South African musician

Ngobeni Ntahleng Peta, known professionally as Peta Teanet (June 1966 – 13, July 1996) was a South African disco musician of Tsonga descent.

== Early life ==
Teanet was born in South Africa in 1966. He grew up in Thapane village, in Bolobedu south of the Ga-Modjadji people. He attended high school at Kgwekgwe High Moleketla Bolobedu. He became fluent in Shona and Swahili and wrote songs in those languages. His mother was Emma Peta and was later known as Emma Teanet since she was also a musician.

== Career ==
In 1987, he recorded a demo of gospel songs that was played on Radio Tsonga. DJ Mr Royi-Royi Ngobeni said he should transition from gospel to disco music. His debut album, Maxaka (English: We are Relatives) was recorded in 1988, influenced by disco musician Paul Ndlovu. It was produced by Leffy Rikotso, who was a former bandmate of Ndlovu. Teanet is his nickname because to the love of instruments. After success of Maxaka in 1988, Teanet released more albums and also for his productions.

Teanet worked and recorded the Soul Lovers (Noah Khosa, Warra Khosa, Chris Mkhonto aka General Musca, and Riot Hlantswayo as a journalist). He worked with Kanda Bongoman and released "Tikakolela ximamani u nga rili". He also worked with Candy Nwayingwane Tsamandebele, Nurse Matlala and Sunglen. in 1992 he released his album Saka na jive Peta Teanet and a rendition of Papa part 2 which is a sample of Sello Chicco Twala "Hisarisile" with an agreement. Teanet was a good friend of Dan "Splash" Tshanda.

=== Peta Teanet Productions ===
He produced Shamila (wife) , Vuyelwa (wife), Emma Teanet (mother), Fosta Teanet The Black Force (brother), Wireless Julius Bomba (Mayimele) (stepfather) Girlie Mafura, Ashante, Linah Khama, Jeanette Teanet (Daughter), The Soul Lovers, Samson Mthombeni, MM Njomane, Tinito from Mozambique,Luz De SA, The Big T, Jahman Teanet, The Heroes, Peta Teanet and the Special Servants, Yvonne Shingange, MA-Soul Lovers, Joseph Baloyi

== Personal life ==
He left 8 wives and 16 known children. Some of his wives are artists and backing singers including: Glory, Shamila (artist), Vuyelwa (artist), Betty (backing vocal and dancer), Miranda (artist), Dikeledi (dancer, backing vocal), Doit (artist), and Rossana aka sesi VA Rossi (artist).

On 13 July 1996 Peta had an argument with an off-duty policeman, The officer shot him in the heart. He was rushed to Tintswalo Hospital where he succumbed to his injuries. The Greater Tzaneen named a ward after him. Also a Street in Diepsloot was name after Peta Teanet.

== Legacy ==
Peta Teanet influenced many artists like Benny Mayengani, Solly Boy, PENSELE, General Musca, Penny - Penny, and Marsh T, Thega Majaja

== Discography ==
- (1988) Maxaka
- (1989) Divorce Case
- (1990) More Hits From Peta Teanet
- (1991) The Gospel Album with The Special Servants
- (1991) The Real Peta Teanet
- (1992) Saka Naye Jive
- (1992) The Heroes Peta Teanet and Paul Ndlovu
- (1993) Peta Teanet U ta ku tsakisa
- (1993) Jahman Teanet Tribute to Chris Hani
- (1993) The Big T
- (1993) Luz De sa
- (1994) Peta Will Excite You
- (1994) The Big T volume 2
- (1994) LUZ De SA (Kwasa-Kwasa)
- (1995) Double Pashash
- (1996) King Of Shangaan Disco
