= Sakubva High School =

Location
- Airport Road, Sakubva, Mutare; Zimbabwe
- Coordinates: 18°59′57.15″S 32°37′45.55″E

Information
- Type: Public, Day school
- Denomination: Non Denominated
- Staff: 30 Teachers
- Grades: Form 1 - 6 (Grade 8-13 equiv.)
- Gender: Mixed
- Enrollment: About 1100
- Campus size: 68 Ha (168 acres)
- Colors: Grey, Blue and White

Sakubva High School is a day school located within Sakubva high density township in Mutare, Zimbabwe. Formerly Sakubva Secondary School but now called Sakubva High School (alias Dangwe), it is also referred to as Sakubva 1 High School. The school is the oldest secondary school in Sakubva township. It produced a number of prominent students from the township. Students typically walk to the school.

== History ==
Since its establishment the school has a history of academic excellence and producing outstanding members of the society, producing the best academic results in Mutare urban. The school enrolled its first A' level (form 5) students in 1988. It is one of the best A' level schools in the province, a standard which has been maintained until today. Year after year Sakubva High School remains the best day school in the province.

== Location ==
The school coordinates are 18° 59' 57.15" S, 32° 37' 45.55" E and is at 1057m elevation. It is located next to Mutare airport on the south western side of Sakubva high density township. The school shares its south-eastern boundary with Mutare Teachers College. Access to the school is through a road off Chimanimani road (A9).

== Education system ==
Students entering Form I, usually aged 13–14, compete for places at the school based on their Grade 7 examination results, as well as school-based interviews and placement tests. The school consists of three levels: ZJC (Zimbabwe Junior Certificate) which includes Forms I and II; "O" level which includes Forms III and IV; and "A" level which includes Forms V and VI. The ZJC Core Curriculum consists of 8 subjects: English, Shona or Ndebele, Mathematics, Science, History, Geography, Bible Knowledge, and a Practical Subject (i.e. Food and Nutrition, Fashion and Fabrics, Woodwork, Agriculture, Metalwork, Technical Drawing, etc.) Zimbabwe phased out the ZJC examinations in 2001, but has maintained the same curricular framework for general Form 1 and 2 education and plan to renew this set of examinations at the end of Form 2 education in 2006.

Based on their Form 1 and 2 reports, students are assigned to courses and tracked classes for their "O" level studies for Forms III and IV.

=== Ordinary level ===
Since the school services Sakubva high-density townships, students are restricted in their options and usually are only afforded the opportunity to take 8 or 9 subjects. Since the early 1990s and until April 2002, GCE "O" level examinations were set and marked in Zimbabwe by the Zimbabwe Examinations Council (ZIMSEC) in conjunction with the University of Cambridge International Examination GCE system. Marks from highest to lowest are A, B, C, D, E, U with A, B, and C as passing marks.

Subjects being offered for "O" level examinations include:

- Sciences: Biology, Chemistry, Physics, Physics with Chemistry, Integrated Science, Mathematics;
- Liberal Arts: English Literature, Religious Education, Geography, History.
- Commercial Subjects: Accounts, Commerce, Economics, Computer Studies.
- Languages: English, Shona.
- Arts: Art, Music
- Practical Subjects: Woodwork, Metalwork, Agriculture, Technical Drawing, Fashion & Fabrics, Food & Nutrition

To receive a passing ZIMSEC "O" level GCE certificate, a student needs to have passed at least five subjects including English language with a mark of "C" or better. The English and mathematics "O" level examinations serve as gatekeepers for many students who cannot proceed without them despite their other exam scores. Entrance into "A" level programs is quite competitive, with the majority of "O" level students either returning to small-scale farming, entering the work force or proceeding to a vocational course, a technical school or a nursing or teaching college. Only students with the best scores manage to find a high school place in an "A" level program.

=== Advanced level ===
At the Advanced "A" level, students choose among science, commercial and art subjects to study for Forms V and VI. The vast majority of students take three subjects at "A" level, with a few very gifted students at elite schools opting for four subjects. In addition, many A level students take "English for Communication”, which before 2004 was called “General Paper," a very challenging exam that assesses both English writing skills and knowledge of current events both nationally and worldwide. English for Communication is marked on a 1–9 scale with 1 as the highest mark and a 1–6 as a pass. Through 2001, "A" level examinations written in Zimbabwe continued to be set and marked at the University of Cambridge in the UK; they have been considerably more challenging than "O" levels, yielding far less favourable pass rates. Starting June 2002 exams, A levels were localised and run by ZIMSEC. It is common for a capable student to have higher "O" level exam marks than her/his "A" level exam marks.

"A" level subjects being offered include:

- Arts: English Literature, Geography, Shona/Ndebele Language and Literature, Divinity, History.
- Commercial: Management of Business/Business Studies, Economics, Accounts, Computer Science.
- Sciences: Biology, Chemistry, Physics, Mathematics, Further Mathematics.
