= Kwe Kwe River =

River in Zimbabwe

Coordinates: 19°55′S 28°38′E

Kwe Kwe River in the Sanyati River catchment (bottom)

Kwe Kwe River (known as Que Que River until 1983) is a small river that runs by the town of Kwekwe in Zimbabwe. It is a lesser tributary of the Sebakwe River and it joins the Sebakwe River north of the town. The water from the river is used by the steel industry that forms the backbone of the town of Kwekwe. The Sebakwe River joins Sanyati River which flows northwards and drains into the Zambezi River.

== See also ==
- Kwekwe
- Kadoma
