= Gaika Mine =

Mine in Zimbabwe

Coordinates: 18.9490°S 29.8098°E

The Gaika Mine, now known as the Gaika Gold Fields, is situated in what was Chicago Farm just about 2 kilometres (1.2 mi) south of Kwekwe CBD. The Gaika Mine was the earliest mine developed in 1894, then Globe and Phoenix in 1895–1900, the Eldorado in 1905, the Antelope in 1908, the Cam and Motor Mine in 1909, the Shamva Mine in 1909–1910, and numerous others during the period 1895–1911.

== Background ==
Gaika is an underground and opencast gold mine established in 1894. It is primarily a Gold mine though some minerals like, Jamesonite, Magnesite, Magnetite, Pyrite, Pyrrhotite and Quartz were found there.

Its water was ferried from Sebakwe River by ox wagon. In the 1904 drought Gaika employees walked to the G&P Mine with empty four-gallon-paraffin-tins to get their water, because G&P Mine was now drawing water from Sebakwe River by pipeline which Gaika Mine had no right to do.

Gaika Mine was also first in the importation of the first Cadillac, (brand new) motor car into the Southern Rhodesia, now Zimbabwe which was imported by Barney and Dora Kahn, owners of the Gaika Concession Store which served Gaika Mine workers in particular.

== Gaika name origin ==
In ChiShona the word gaika means be ground or be milled. Gaya means "mill" or "grind". It would be reasonable to conclude that the name Gaika" comes from the ChiShona exclamation; mukute unoGaika nhai? meaning "so gold can be milled! or so gold can be ground!

However, because those who pegged the claim had come through South Africa, it must be assumed that the name has South African roots. The name Gaika possibly derives from the Gaika people who are also called the Ngqikathe royal clan of Ciskei in South Africa.

Gaika Mine cannot have derived its name from planet Gaika because Gaika Mine is much senior to the discovery of minor planets such as 1358 Gaika which was discovered as late as 21 July 1935 in Johannesburg by C. Jackson.

The planet got its name from the Gaika people as both names 9Gaika people and 1358 Gaika) refer to South African subjects.

Explorers and Pioneers advanced into the then Southern Rhodesia from South Africa which makes the use of the South African name Gaika less questionable, particularly that the Gaika people were of royal lineage and very influential.

== Operations ==
In its lifetime about 23 tonnes of gold were extracted from about 2, 626,671 tonnes of ore, that's an average of 8.7 grams gold per tonne.

Gaika was the second largest gold producer in the Kwekwe District after G&P Mine which was the largest in both Zimbabwe and the world over.

== Gaika Mine to Chicago-Gaika Mine ==
Gaika Mine operated from 1894 to 1929 (35 years). It resurrected under new ownership of Que Que Mines as Chicago-Gaika Mine. (it was a matter of reverting to the old name.)

The new company restarted the mine with a capital 30 times lesser than the former company's capital. (£5,000 over £140,000) However between 1931to 1935 they were able to issue an average of more than 400% return on investment per annum for the local shareholders; that was a total £100,000 in dividends in 4 years.

== Environmental challenges ==
Gaika Mine, which lies in the suburbs of Chicago has tunnels running beneath Kwekwe. making a network with those from G&P Mine on the other side of the CBD.

However, Kwekwe was built between Gaika Mine and Globe and Phoenix Mine with all precautions taken to make sure the residents would be safe atop several mine tunnels running beneath the city. Kwekwe which was originally Sebakwe developed from residential settlements for both Gaika and G&P gold mines.

== See also ==
- Kwekwe
- Globe and Phoenix Mine
- Chicago
- Kwekwe District
