= Globe and Phoenix Mine =

Zimbabwean gold mine

Coordinates: 18.8944°S 29.8111°E

Globe and Phoenix Mine (G&P Mine) is a gold mine in Zimbabwe. It is just outside Kwekwe CBD.

G&P Mine was pegged on the site of ancient gold workings in 1894 by prospectors Edward Thornton Pearson and Joseph Schukala. The two men were shown this ancient mining place by a Shona native whose confidence they bought with two blankets.

The head works of the mine still dominate Kwekwe City which was founded from the mine's compound township which was known as Sebakwe before merging with the then Fort Kwekwe and assuming the name Kwekwe, then spelt Que Que.

G&P Mine, although it once produced the world's richest gold ore, has its palmy days over now. Other mineral found at the mine are Kermesite, Magnetite, Quartz and Stibnite.

It is located a few hundred metres from the CBD westwards.

== Background ==
G&P Mine was originally known as King Solomon's Mines, and the biblical Ophir where the Queen of Sheba took 450 tablets of gold which she took to Jerusalem's King Solomon, hence the nicknames "Jewellers' Shop", "Lousy with Gold" and "Too rich to be mined".

The first European men to see the Globe and Phoenix Reefs were Edward Thornton Pearson and Joseph Schukala.

Edward Thornton Pearson pegged the Phoenix reefs which was about 122 metres and followed the quartz down for 38 metres.

Joseph Schukala pegged the Globe reefs which was over 200 metres long, with a maximum depth of 20 metres. Each man registered his own claim in Bulawayo in May 1894, but none of them had capital to exploit his claim. Legend says that Joseph Schukala once tried to sell his claim for a case of whisky.

Lionel Phillips of Phillips Exploration Syndicate bought both the Globe and Phoenix reefs in September 1894, hence the name Globe and Phoenix Mine.

Lionel Phillips paid £300 cash and 500 on £1 shares for the Globe Reef and £600 for the Phoenix Reef paid in gold sovereigns at Shepherds Beer Hall in Gwelo where many business transactions were done in those days.

The Globe and Phoenix Mining Company was incorporated on 18 October 1896 with a capital of £175,000 in £1 shares.

=== Historical Challenges ===
- Drinking Water for G&P Mine and Gaika Mine was ferried from Sebakwe River by ox wagon until G&P Mine was granted the right to pipeline water from the river 5.25 miles (8.45 km) away in 1898 after a legal wrangle with the authorities.

Que Que village was dependent on the mine for its water supply. because the better part of the villagers were mine workers here.

- 1918 Flu Pandemic

October 1918 was a month G&P Mine did not want to remember due to the national pandemic “Flu”.

Mirleen Atkinson, wife of former G&P Mine manager wrote that the 1918 flu pandemic which ran from January 1918 – December 1920 affected G&P Mine workers severely. Once upon those days out of four hundred underground workers, only nineteen reported for work. Most of the hospital staff were also ill and Dr. Davey himself administered help and advice from his sick bed. Some patients were hospitalized in the Club Hall. Ten G&P Mine European staff and about three hundred African workers died.

There were 8 deaths recorded for the month of October only with the 9th dying on 2 November 1918. Only one was a woman.

Source: (Geni Records)

- Holdstock, James William. 13 Oct 1918 (age 44)
- Reynolds, Oliver. 17 Oct 1918 (age 35)
- Fraundorfer, Gustav Max. 21 Oct 1918 (age 32)
- Graydon, Joseph. 21 Oct 1918 (age 44)
- Kay, Arther Douglas. 22 Oct 1918 (age 26)
- Omar, Hassan. 24 Oct 1918 (age 30)
- Lopis, Philip. 25 Oct 1918 (age 27)
- Green, Lillian Florence. 26 Oct 1918 (age 23)
- Dundas, William Duncan Alexander. 2 Nov 1918 (age 28)

== Operations ==
=== Productivity ===
The original G&P Mine in its lifetime produced over 4.2 million ounces of gold in its lifetime at an average grade of 27.6 grams per tonne. No wonder the Zimbabwe National Mining Museum is situated here. The National Mining Museum evolved from Kwekwe Mining Museum which was established in 1930.

=== Senior Staff Cabins ===
First houses at G&P Mine compound were log, mud and tin shacks.

However the first Globe and Phoenix Gold Mine manager, Mr. H.A Piper's two roomed cabin built in 1894 using wood and reinforced cardboard survives and can be seen in the museum here.

The house was built in England and shipped to Zimbabwe via Port Elizabeth in South Africa. The manager used it as his house until 1902 when the mine built him a proper house they named "Phoenix House". He then used the structure as his office.

The structure was proclaimed an historic building and National Monument in 1975.

=== Sebakwe ===
The place where Kwekwe stands today was originally called Sebakwe Village so named after the Sebakwe River about 5.25 miles (8.45 km) northeast.

It was a workers' compound township for Globe and Phoenix Mine established in 1894 with the forty stamp mill producing the first gold in August 1900.

Sebakwe Village started serious developments as early as 1895.

In 1895, the Sebakwe Post Office was established. After the post office separate African and European hospitals were established. On 5 November 1901 the railway line was connected with Salisbury..Globe and Phoenix Railway Station.The Beira and Mashonaland Railway Company completed the rail link south between Salisbury and the Globe and Phoenix Station, later called QueQue Station in 1901. In 1902 the railway was connect to Bulawayo.

Before the railway line came it took three days to reach Gweru by donkey drawn carts. Now the train took four hours as long as the engine driver was not tempted by a herd of antelope to stop and shoot an animal for food, or visit a friend residing somewhere reachable in minutes.

=== Fort Kwekwe ===
Kwekwe, a small fort based on the river of the same name, established soon after the Pioneer Column entered Fort Salisbury to occupy Mashonaland, had been a British South African Police post consisting of one officer, one senior non-commissioned officer, six European troopers and 15 African policemen.

It was situated at the banks of Kwekwe River, named after the que-que sound of croaking frogs in the river. It was not in any way connected to G&P Mine let alone being a police post.

=== Kwekwe Village ===
With the development of the Globe and Phoenix Mine, the few inhabitants of the Fort Kwekwe gradually drifted over to Sebakwe until there was no point in keeping the police post at Fort Kwekwe running. The relocation of Kwekwe (without the tag "Fort") to Sebakwe Village came by when the promise of the G&P Mine proved the greater attraction {convert|9|mi|km} away. It was in 1898 the final relocation took place and the place but the name remained Sebakwe Village with Kwekwe being used by the BSAP for their police post. Because the government department had moved in, it was officially established as a settlement apart from the mine.

On 20 August 1902, Sebakwe was renamed Que Que and a village management board took over with the general manager of the Globe and Phoenix mine as first chairman.

By 1919 Kwekwe was still known as Kwekwe Village and its grave yard was known as Kwekwe Village Cemetery.

Had it not been that Fort Kwekwe was a government establishment the place called Kwekwe today would have remained Sebakwe because Sebakwe River is only about 8.5 km away while Kwekwe River is about 14.5 km away. The name of the nearest and larger river would have prevailed.

Kwekwe Village sanitary board was established in 1904 but by 1910 there were only thirteen residential stands and of the fifty four business stands marked, only twenty had been allocated to willing developers.

== Current Ownership ==
Globe and Phoenix Mine is now under new ownership, the Olympic Gold Mines NL (OGM) a holding company owning KweKwe Consolidated Gold Mines Pvt Ltd (Zimbabwe) (KCGM) which collectively trades as Globe and Phoenix Gold Mining Company Limited (GPGMCL).

The holding company was bought from Delta Gold NL in 2002 by BioMetallurgical (GPGMCL) which is focused on the major new development of the Globe and Phoenix Mine.

Over the past 12 years, the company acquired the majority mineral rights on the geological strike North of the Globe and Phoenix Mine. It intends to develop a decline from the ANZAC mine about 8 km north-north-west of Kwekwe.

The plan is that the decline will pass along the geological strike and underneath over 100 old shafts and thousands of small workings from which several hundred thousand ounces were also mined from 1900 to the 1960s.

The area has great potential on the fact that Gaika Mine lies immediately South and Indarama Mine which lies immediately North of the Globe and Phoenix Gold Mining Company Limited decline Project, are the second and third largest gold producers in Kwekwe District respectively.

Apart from Globe and Phoenix Mine, Globe and Phoenix Gold Mining Company Limited also owns John Bull Mine, Primrose Mine, Skeleton Mine, RO Mine, Vuntade Mine, Piper Moss Mine, Monte Christo Mine and ANZAC Mine, all in the same region.

The majority of these mines have been virtually not been fully exploited since the 1960s and now have considerable potential under one network.

GPGMCL priority is to reopen Globe and Phoenix Mine and generate thousands of jobs for local people including those currently illegally gold panning on Globe and GPGMCL claims and old mines.

== Current Challenges ==
=== Illegal Gold Panners ===
Kwekwe is infested with illegal gold panners and unlike other cities, in Kwekwe they operate from just as near the CBD as a hundred metres.

People in Kwekwe live in fear amid recent mishaps thought to have been caused by illegal gold panners' work.

- An entire garden and a three-metre guava tree were swallowed by a suspected mine tunnel some 30 metres beneath the suburb.
- Illegal panners dug and emerged from under a classroom at Globe and Phoenix Primary School in the dead of the night. The block has since been closed. The school is about 500 metres from the CBD.
- In February, 2014, a few kilometres away from the G and P compound, a miner on his way to work was swallowed when the ground gave in under him. Unfortunately, the miner died.
- Elsewhere in Shurugwi, an entire two-roomed house disappeared into the ground after a mine tunnel collapsed. The mishaps keep residents of mining towns questioning their safety in these environments.

=== Mine Tunnels ===
There are several tunnels beneath the city of Kwekwe forming a network with those from Gaika Mine.

However city engineers have assured residents that city buildings are safe.

They say illegal gold panners can only go as deep as levels 1 and 2. Levels 3 to 46 are covered by underground water and illegal gold panners have no capacity to access such levels.

The tunnels are also too narrow to cause significant disturbances outside those depths.

The longest tunnel that passes beneath the CBD is 43 km long and 873 metres deep. This depth is level 26 and 27 which way below sea level posing no threat to city buildings.

== See also ==
- Kwekwe
- Kwekwe District
- Gaika Mine
- Indarama Mine
