= Shacky Timburwa =

Zimbabwean entrepreneur and speaker

- Born: 9 May 1992 (age 34); Mutare, Zimbabwe
- Occupations: Entrepreneur, politician
- Known for: Forbes Africa 30 under 30

Shacky Timburwa (born 9 May 1992) is a Zimbabwean entrepreneur, speaker and a parliamentarian for Chegutu West constituency since 2024.

== Early life ==
Shacky Timburwa was born in Mutare, Zimbabwe. He grew up in Dangamvura suburb of Mutare. He enrolled at University of Zimbabwe in 2023 to pursue Bachelor of Law (BLS) and is yet to graduate.

== Controversies ==
In 2025 Timburwa was exposed for falsifying academic qualifications. An investigation by a UK publication revealed that Timburwa had lied when he claimed he had been awarded a PhD in International Relations by UNISA in 2023.

== Career ==
Timburwa is the founder of Energy Plus, an energy company and Parvaim Gold Holdings a mining company. In 2019, he was listed among 100 Most Influential Young Leaders in Africa by Pan-African Youth Leadership. He was also recognised in the Zimbabwe's top 40 Most Influential Leaders of 2020 by Young Corporate Directors' Network of the Institute of Corporate Directors Zimbabwe in collaboration with Institute of Corporate Governance Zimbabwe as well as international bodies such as Professional Director Canada and Governance Solutions Canada.

In 2021, Shacky Timburwa was listed among the Forbes Africa 30 under 30 class of 2021. According to Forbes Africa, those who made the list are change makers for a new COVID-19 induced agenda for social change. He was also nominated to take part at the Pan African Youth Leadership Forum, World Energy Council's Future Energy Leaders Program. Timburwa was appointed to represent Zimbabwe at the Global Chamber of Business Leaders, Young Business Leaders’ Programme.

In 2023, Timburwa announced that he will participate for National Assembly by-elections representing ZANU PF then in 2024 he was elected as a Member of Parliament for Chegutu West Constituency. In parliament, he was appointed into committees for Energy Portfolio, ICT Portfolio and Youth Portfolio.
