= Mbizo =

- Township, suburb
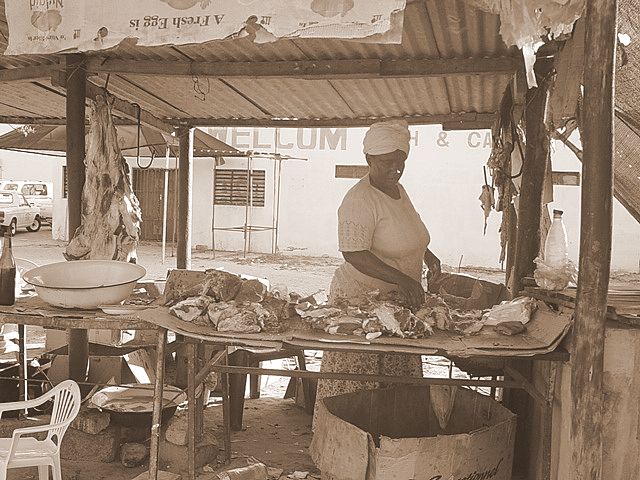
- Woman selling meat, one of the many trades in the town.
- Interactive map of Mbizo
- Coordinates: 18°55′S 29°49′E
- Country: Zimbabwe
- Province: Midlands
- District: Kwekwe
- Established: late 19th Century
- Time zone: UTC+1 (CET)
  - Summer (DST): UTC+1 (CEST)

Mbizo is a suburb in Kwekwe, a city in the Midlands Province of Zimbabwe. Alongside Amaveni, it is one of Kwekwe's two high-density suburbs. As of October 2024, it had a population of approximately 50,000.

== Layout ==
Mbizo is divided into several sections, numbered from Mbizo 1 up to Mbizo 22. Mbizo 1 and 2 form the oldest part of the suburb, which was originally built to house cheap labour for the gold mines in uptown.

The neighbourhood is located east of the city centre, across the railway line from the Zimbabwe Iron and Smelting Company (ZIMASCO), the country's largest ferrochrome producer. Mbizo Stadium is located across from Section 1. Nearby, Manunure High School sprawls in a meadow across the street from Section 2.

Mbizo contains three of the city's five city-run clinics, and the city's only youth centre.

== History ==
The suburb, like all of Zimbabwe's major towns and cities, was formerly a black-only area, reserved for the poor African population that came to the town in search of jobs. Together with Amaveni, Mbizo supplied labour to the gold mines scattered across the growing town. Since Zimbabwe gained independence, the population of the suburb has increased dramatically, with the suburb expanding from 2 to 22 sections.

=== Mbizo Stadium stampede ===
On 21 November 2014, a stampede occurred at Mbizo Stadium, killing 11 and injuring 40 people. Reuters reported that around 30,000 people attended a religious service officiated by Walter Magaya. After the service, a large portion of the crowd attempted to leave the stadium using one exit. Four people died instantly in the ensuing stampede, while seven more were pronounced dead at a nearby hospital. The Indo-Asian News Service reported that the stampede was caused by police firing tear gas after some of the crowd attempted to break off parts of the stadium wall to exit, while police said it was due to a "burst gas bottle".

== Politics ==
Since 2000, when the Movement for Democratic Change (MDC) competed in elections, there has been sporadic political violence in many parts of the ward. ZANU-PF militia units have been at the forefront of political violence in the township without police intervention. Members of the MDC have been kidnapped, had their homes burnt, and been otherwise persecuted by the Zimbabwe Republic Police. Political violence in Mbizo was reported in 2000, 2002, 2005, 2006, and 2008.

The successor party to the MDC, the Citizens Coalition for Change (CCC), faced similar violence. In 2022, Zimbabwean police arrested 16 suspected ZANU-PF supporters over violence at a CCC rally in Mbizo that led to one death.

== Recreation ==
Mbizo Stadium is a small stadium in Mbizo 1 used for various activities, including hosting music concerts by popular artists like Alick Macheso, Simon Chimbetu, and Tongai Moyo. It has a capacity of about a thousand people.

== Notable people ==
- Samukeliso Sithole, a teenager who won seven gold medals in women's athletics events in 2004, sentenced to jail for being a man impersonating a woman.

== See also ==
- Amaveni
- Kwekwe
