= Chahwanda Stadium =

Football stadium in Kwekwe, Zimbabwe

- Interactive map of Chahwanda Stadium
- Location: Kwekwe, Zimbabwe
- Coordinates: 18.9001°S 29.7929°E
- Capacity: 15,000
- Surface: Grass

Construction
- Opened: Under construction

Tenant
- Hardrock F.C.

Chahwanda Stadium is a football stadium in Kwekwe, Zimbabwe due to host its first match in March 2026.

The stadium is intended to be Category-2 stadium, able to host Under 17 and Under 23 African Cup of Nations qualifiers, as well as CAF Champions League and CAF Confederation Cup preliminary round matches.

The project is being run by Prophet Walter Magaya and his partner Shepherd Chahwanda, owner of Hardrock F.C.

The stadium was completed by the end of February 2026 and will host its first match in March 2026.

== See also ==
- List of African stadiums by capacity
- List of stadiums in Africa
