= Lancashire Steel F.C. =

Zimbabwean football club

Lancashire Steel
- Full name: Lancashire Steel Football Club
- Nickname: Chimbi Chimbi Boys
- Founded: 1992; 34 years ago
- Ground: Baghdad Stadium, Kwekwe
- Capacity: 5,000
- Manager: Innocent Chogugudza
- League: Zimbabwe Premier Soccer League
Home colours

Lancashire Steel F.C. were a Zimbabwean football club which was based in Kwekwe. They were set to play in the second tier of Zimbabwean football after their relegation at the end of the 2008 football season before folding up. Their home stadium is Baghdad Stadium. Lancashire Steel sold their franchise to Mateta (Gokwe) in 2009. The club reformed in 2010 and played in the Midlands Region Division Two 2B were they finish Runners-up in the league. In 2011 Lancashire Steel are in the Zifa Central Region Division One.

== History ==
The club was promoted into the Zimbabwe Premier Soccer League in 1994 and have gone on to establish themselves as a mid-table club that has been in the league continuously from 1994 to 2009. The likes of former Zimbabwe international's Paul Gundani, Luke Petros and Petros Sibanda are counted among former players.

The most memorable time at the club was in 1999 when, under the guidance of Ashton "Papa" Nyazika, they beat Caps United in the first Z$1m Madison trophy at the National Sports Stadium to collect their only piece of silverware to date, a parade of the trophy in Kwekwe the week after the victory saw over 100,000 Kwekweans take to the streets as a sign of appreciation to what the boys had done.

The 2008 season ended badly for the Chimbi Boys, finishing 13th and therefore given the difficult task of playing in the relegation-promotion playoffs with the three runners-up of the 1st division. Eagles FC of Marondera pipped them to the post therefore confirming their relegation.
