= Sakubva Stadium =

Football stadium in Zimbabwe

- mugomba
- Interactive map of Sakubva Stadium
- Full name: Sakubva Stadium
- Location: Mutare, Zimbabwe
- Coordinates: 18°59′48.60″S 32°38′27.33″E
- Capacity: 20,000

Tenant
- Manica Diamonds

Sakubva Stadium is a multi-use stadium located in Sakubva township in Mutare, Zimbabwe. It is currently used mostly for soccer matches, on club level by Manica Diamonds of the Zimbabwe Premier Soccer League. The stadium has a capacity of 20,000 spectators.

It was previously the home of Motor Action F.C.

== See also ==
- Mutare
- Sakubva
