= Kwekwe High School =

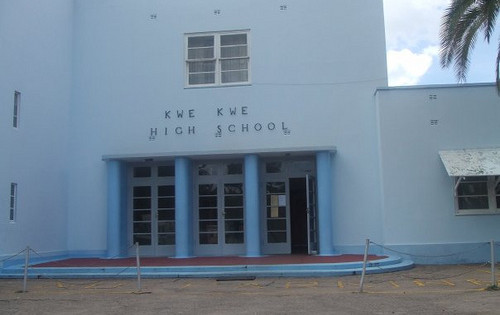

Location
- Kwekwe; Zimbabwe
- Coordinates: 18.9371074°S 29.8070148°E

Information
- Other name: Kwekwe High
- Former name: QueQue High School
- Type: High School, Boarding School, Day School, A School
- Motto: Non Sibi Sed Omnibus (Not for one but for us all)
- School district: Kwekwe
- Authority: Government of Zimbabwe - Ministry of Primary and Secondary Education
- Head teacher: Mr. Master Shumba
- Gender: Male and Female
- Age range: 12-19
- Language: English
- Colors: Grey and Blue
- Teams: ZISCO, ZIMASCO, SABLES, LANCASHIRE

Kwekwe High School is a high school in the city of Kwekwe, in the Midlands Region of Zimbabwe. It was known until 1982 as Que Que High School. The school motto is Non Sibi Sed Omnibus (not for one but for us all). Kwekwe High is a co-ed multi-racial school that offers education from Form 1 up to Form 6 and offers sports such as rugby, cricket, tennis, basketball, swimming, field hockey, netball and volleyball. The school was founded in the early twentieth century, and was a combined primary and secondary school until the late 1920s when it was separated. At its inception the school mainly served the children of white employees of the Globe and Phoenix Gold Mine and of industries based on nearby deposits of iron and chromite, along with the children of local white farmers and ranchers. The school was opened to students of all races in 1980. It has some 1,500 students and 50 teachers, with six of them teaching mathematics. The class sizes are usually between 40 and 43 students per class.

In 2004, the school hosted finals of both the National Association of School Heads (NASH) middle and high school soccer tournament and the Olivine Industries Schools National Netball Tournament. The current headmaster is Mr. Shumba. The school has 2 hostels (Davenport House and Davey House) which accommodate approximately 300 termly boarding students. Davern Port is the girls hostel and the current hostel mistress is Mrs Mukwananzi and Davey House is the boys hostel and the current hostel master is Mr P. Muchechemera. The school is located just opposite Fitchlea suburb; it is situated along Kwekwe - Gweru highway.
