= Sakubva =

- Suburb
- Location within Zimbabwe
- Coordinates: 18°59′0″S 32°39′0″E
- Country: Zimbabwe
- Province: Manicaland
- City: Mutare

Population
  - Estimate (2002): 50,000−65,000

Sakubva township is a high-density suburb in the city of Mutare, Zimbabwe, which contains nearly a quarter of the population of Mutare despite an area of less than four square miles. It was the first high-density suburb (township) being established in Mutare. At that time, it was located in the Old Location section of Sakubva. It is the poorest of Mutare's suburb and its economy is centred on a large outdoor food and flea market.

Sakubva's most famous attraction is the Sakubva Market, also referred to as Musika Wehuku which means the 'Chicken market.' The market has the largest food and vegetable markets, traditional artwork, and a second-hand clothing market.

Significant portions of Sakubva's informal houses were destroyed by police and military forces during the operation Murambatsvina in May 2005.

== Economy ==
Sakubva is the poorest of Mutare's suburbs and its economy is centred on a large outdoor food and flea market called Sakubva Market, also referred to as 'Musika Wehuku' which means the 'chicken market.' The market has the largest food and vegetable markets, traditional artwork, and a second-hand clothing market. Over the past few years the suburb has suffered as a result of the collapse of the country's economy.

== History ==
Sakubva is the first black location of Mutare. It was established in 1925. By 1927 its population had grown to 200. It was originally designed as single rooms to house black male workers for the nearby industries of Mutare. During this period, blacks were treated as temporary migrants who did not require family accommodation. Such a philosophy ensured that there was no need to provide blacks with family accommodation. Before 1935 black housing provision in Mutare was believed to be financed with profits made through the sale of opaque beer in beer halls located in the city's low-income residential area. By 2002, however, the population of Sakubva was estimated to be between 50,000 and 65,000.

== Location ==
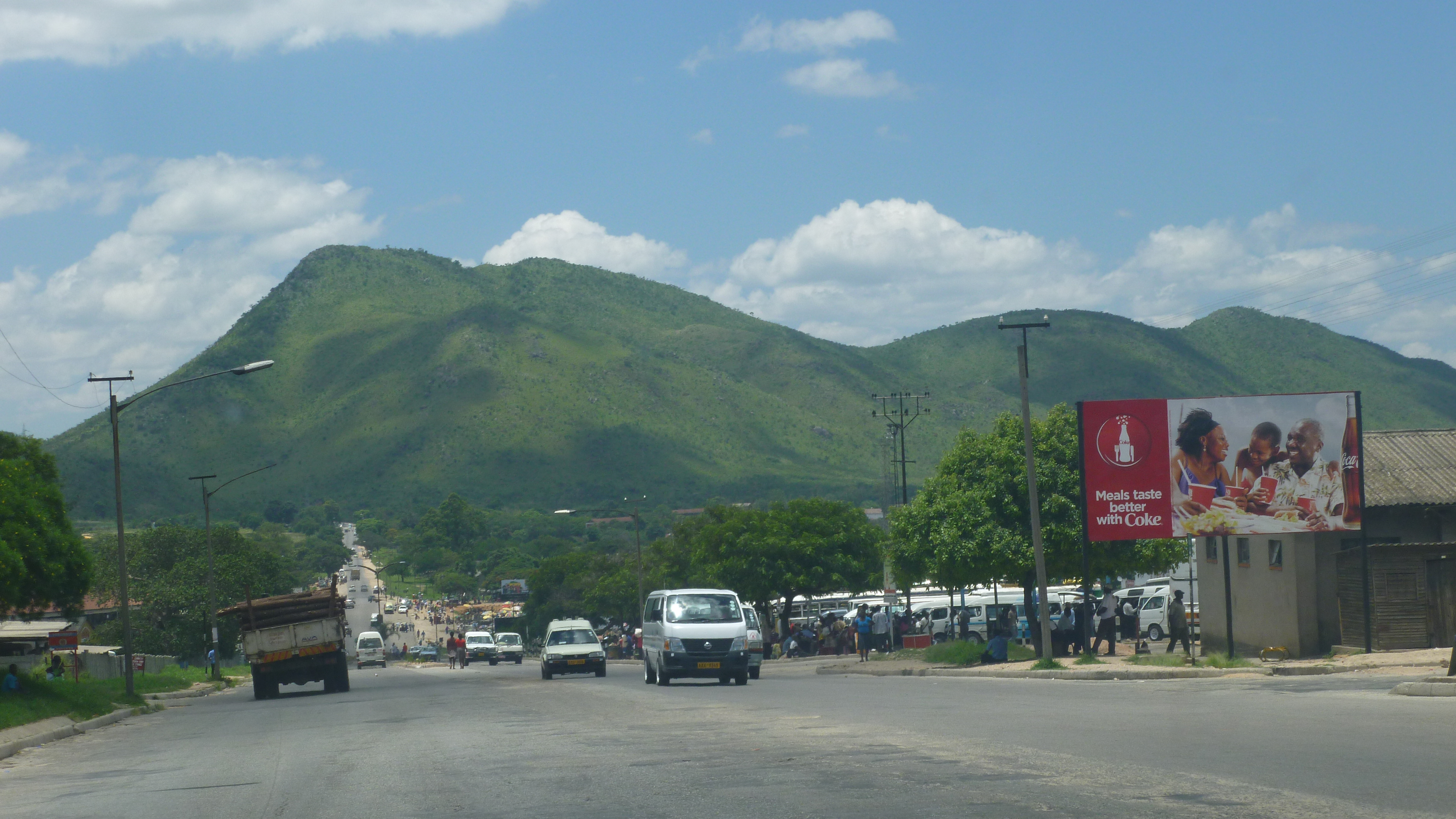
Mutare Chimanimani road looking south with Sakubva on the right.

Sakubva township is located about five kilometres south-west of the central business district of Mutare; south of the railway line and west of Chimanimani road. It is divided into the following sections; Chisamba Singles, New and Old Chisamba, St Joseph's, Zororo, Devonshire, Nyausunzi, Muchena, Chitungo, Chineta, New and Old Dangare, Mazhambe, Maonde, Tenderere, NHB, Macgregors, Blocks, Murahwa, Avenues, Old location, Matida Flats and OTS sections.

== Education ==
Sakubva has a number of schools and tertiary institutions.

=== Primary schools ===
Sakubva has five government primary schools namely Mutanda Primary School, Chisamba, Sakubva, Zamba and Dangare Primary Schools. St Joseph's Primary and High School is a Roman Catholic-run school.

=== Secondary schools ===
Sakubva High School, Rushingo Secondary School, Elise Gledhill Secondary School and St Joseph's School are the four secondary schools in Sakubva. Recently, a number of privately owned high schools have sprouted in Sakubva to meet the ever increasing population the most prominent of which is First Class Academy. These "colleges" are popular because they stray from the conventional teaching methods and they accommodate older students who intend to repeat their secondary education

=== Tertiary institutions ===
- Mutare Teachers College.
- St Josephs Catholic Mission
- Mutare Polytechnic
- Marry mount teachers college

== Hospitals ==
- Sakubva District Hospital
- Sakubva Health Centre
- St Joseph's Hospital

== Entertainment and recreation ==
=== Sports ===
- Sakubva Stadium is located in Sakubva.
- Methuen Grounds, also referred to as Sports Oval.
- Next to the stadium is a public swimming pool available for residents.

=== Leisure ===
Sakubva Stadium made history on the night of 29 April 1989 when Oliver Mtukudzi held the Tuku Live at Sakubva Concert where he recorded his first live album. The recording was also the first live musical recording of Zimbabwe. Fans came from Bulawayo, Chipinge, Harare, Rusape, Chiredzi, Kwekwe, Gweru including neighbouring Mozambique. Simon Chimbetu, Illanga and Penga Udzoke were supporting artists at the concert.

=== Violence and Tensions ===
Sakubva has been a subject of violence due to the activities of the so-called bouncers and some of them work for notable Politicians. There has been cases of violence between the residents from Chisamba Singles (Japanese) and the residents of NHBs, OTS, Matida (Americans). Notable and influential leaders of these groups are Pension "Master Payee" Gwinyai, Martin and Joel Chitsinga. There has been recorded cases of "hwindis" fighting for ranks in Sakubva Market e.g. the Hobhouse, Dangamvura, Swimming Pool ranks etc.

== Notable places ==
- Old Folks Home is an old age home in the Old Location section of Sakubva
- Sakubva Beit Hall is probably one of Mutare's oldest theatre centre and one of the most notable historical buildings in Sakubva
- Queens Hall
- Sakubva Stadium which hosted the 6th Africa Games.
- Mutare Airport
- Sakubva Market
- Nyausunzi Beer Hall
- Sakubva Sewer Works
- St Joseph's Cemetery
- Sakubva Library
- Sakubva Police Station
- Sakubva Post office
- Sakubva Swimming Pool
- Maonde Beer Hall
- Old Location Beer Hall
- Hilltop United Methodist Church - one of oldest UMC churches in Zimbabwe.

== Notable people ==
- Lawrence Mudehwe, former mayor of Mutare
- Edson Sithole, lawyer
- Morgan Tsvangirai, former prime minister of Zimbabwe
