= Mbizo Stadium =

Small stadium in Mbizo township, Zimbabwe

Mbizo Stadium is a small stadium in Mbizo township, north-west of the city of Kwekwe in Zimbabwe. It is used for various activities, from hosting music concerts by popular artists like Alick Macheso, Simon Chimbetu to Tongai Moyo, a native of the town. The stadium is located in Mbizo section one, the oldest part of the township. It has a capacity of about a thousand people.

On 21 November 2014, a stampede occurred at stadium and killing 11 and injuring 40 people. Reuters reported that around 30,000 people attended a religious service officiated by Walter Magaya. After the service, the crowd left toward a single exit in a stampede, killing four immediately; seven others were pronounced dead at hospital. The Business Standard reported that the stampede was caused by police firing teargas after some of the crowd attempted to break off parts of the stadium wall to exit.

== See also ==
- Kwekwe
- Mbizo Township
- Baghdad Stadium
