= Kwekwe East Airport =

Airport in Zimbabwe

- IATA: none; ICAO: FVKK

Summary
- Airport type: Public
- Serves: Kwekwe
- Elevation AMSL: 4,069 ft / 1,240 m
- Coordinates: 19°0′40″S 30°01′35″E

Map
- Location of the airport in Zimbabwe

Runways
Direction	Length		Surface
Direction	ft	m	Surface
09/27	3,660	1,116	Asphalt
- Sources:, CloudMade Maps.

Kwekwe East Airport (IATA: FVKK) is an airport serving Kwekwe, a mining town in Midlands Province, Zimbabwe.

== See also ==
- Transport in Zimbabwe
