= Munyati =

Munyati Umniati
- Estate
- Interactive map of Munyati
- Country: Zimbabwe
- District: Kwekwe

Government
  - Type: Democracy
  - Body: Ministry of Energy and Power Development
  - Owner: Zimbabwe Power Company

Population
  - Total: 2,000

Munyati (formerly Umniati) is an estate in Midlands province in Zimbabwe owned by the Zimbabwe Power Company (a subsidiary of ZESA) . It is located about 29 km (18 miles) north of Kwekwe on the main Harare-Bulawayo road, which was about 5 km (3.1 miles) away from the village center. In 1938, a coal-fired power station was built in the area and the village was established to house the personnel. It also has a few shops for regular shopping, a primary and secondary (high) school and a football team called Tigers. Gold, copper, stibnite and tungsten are mined in the area. Munyati happens to be the name of a river in this region.

== Education ==
Munyati has educational facilities for its community members.

=== Schools ===
As a small estate, Munyati offers three stages of education which are Preschool, Primary School and High School. The educational facilities in Munyati are named Munyati Pre-School, Munyati Primary School and Munyati High School . Locally, over 500 children/students are enrolled every year. Some come from near cities, "Kwekwe" and Villages.

== See also ==
- Munyati River
