= Adiel Kugotsi =

Zimbabwean cricketer (born 1984)

Personal information
- Born: 3 October 1984 (age 42); Mutare, Manicaland, Zimbabwe
- Batting: Right-handed
- Bowling: Right-arm medium-fast

Domestic team information
- Years: Team
- 2001/02–2003/04: Manicaland

Career statistics
Competition	FC
Matches	6
Runs scored	63
Batting average	5.72
100s/50s	0/0
Top score	34
Balls bowled	120
Wickets	0
Bowling average	–
5 wickets in innings	–
10 wickets in match	–
Best bowling	–
Catches/stumpings	4/–
- Source: ESPNcricinfo, 16 July 2021

Adiel Kugotsi (born 3 October 1984) is a former Zimbabwean cricketer. A right-handed batsman and right-arm medium-fast bowler, he played six first-class matches for Manicaland between 2002 and 2004.
