= Farai Tumbare =

Zimbabwean basketball player

Personal information
- Born: 6 July 1978 (age 46); Harare, Zimbabwe

Career information
- Playing career: 199?–2012
- Position: Power forward

Career highlights
- 3× Zimbabwean National League (2004–2006)

Farai Tumbare (born 6 July 1978) is a Zimbabwean former basketball player. Nicknamed The Tombstone, he was a member of the Zimbabwean men's national basketball team.

== Early life ==
Tumbare comes from the high density suburb of Tafara in Harare, Zimbabwe, was a primary and high school captain and an excellent academic and sportsperson.

== Club career ==
He was a member of the Cameo outfit coached by Roderick Takawira that won both the Harare Basketball League and National League titles for three straight seasons from 2004 to 2006.

== National team career ==
Tumbare captained both Mashonaland and Zimbabwean men's national basketball teams between the years 2003–2009.
