= Sebakwe River =

River in Zimbabwe

Sebakwe River in the Sanyati River catchment (bottom)

Sebakwe River or Zibagwe River is a river in Zimbabwe.

Sebakwe River is located in the Midlands Province of Zimbabwe. It has a length 150 kilometres (93 mi) straight line from source to mouth, and is a tributary of Munyati River which it joins in Zhombe East at 18°36′10″S 29°37′08″E.

Sebakwe River descends from the south-western heel of Mtoro Hill, elevation 1,580 metres (5,180 ft), north-east of Chivhu. It then flows south-westerly, east of Chivhu and west of The Range.

== Background ==
The name Sebakwe is a distortion of the name Zibagwe meaning a very large maize plant or cob. The other version of the originality of the name say it derives from the name "Chiwake meaning 'that which is built up', referring to a barrier built during the Rebellion".

Presently the name "Zibagwe" prevails. There is a legend orally transmitted that tells how the name Zibagwe came about. It says Zibagwe which is a ChiShona name for " a very large maize plant or cob" was given when local people visited to scavenge the camp that the European explorers had set for months. The said explorers had just left the camp to a destination further north into Mashonaland. Locals found a very large maize plant with very large cobs at the abandoned camp. Even though they had come treasure hunting for whatever the White men could have left behind, no one touched the tempting maize plant because it was by the camp urinal, well fertilized by urine. The said maize plant was there for a long time, and because it was on the river bank, they called the river as "kuZibagwe" meaning "at the extra-large-maize plant".

Though not officially stated it is thought that the Zibagwe "Urinal" Maize Plant encouraged the ecological experimental toilets project carried out in Zimbabwe a few years ago. A 3-year research project using diluted urine as fertilizer was conducted in Epworth, Harare (2008–2010) and the results were very positive. (The whole book shows how the application of diluted urine on plants can be very effective on plant growth.)

== Little Sebakwe River ==
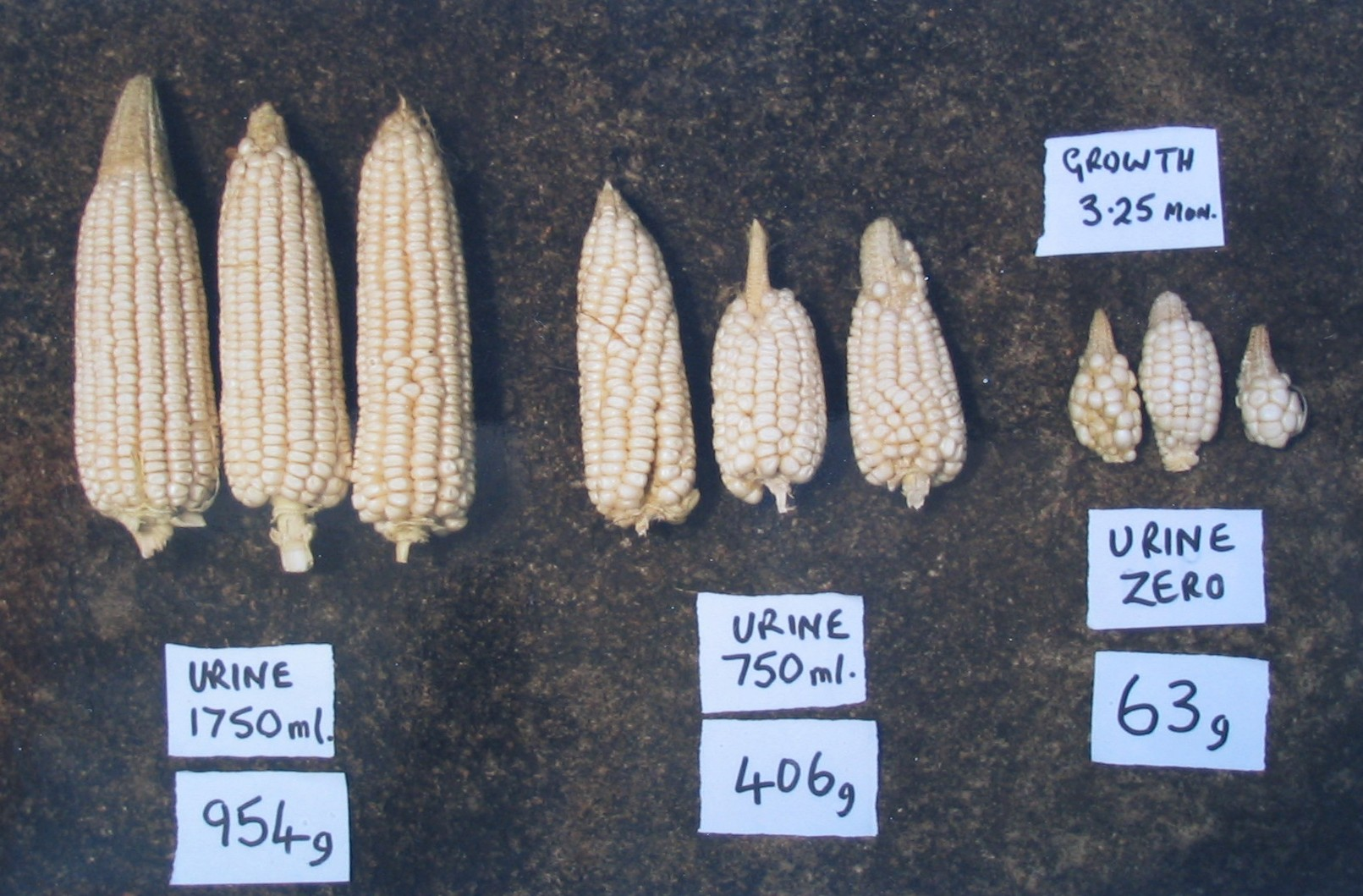
Effect of Urine treatment on maize growth. The bigger cob here is referred to as Zibagwe.

The main Sebakwe River flows into the Munyati River. There is another Sebakwe River known as Little Sebakwe River which has a length of 7.6 kilometres (4.7 mi) and is entirely in Mashonaland East Province. Unlike the main Sebakwe River it flows easterly into Nyazvidzi River, the Save River drainage basin. Little Sebakwe passes north of Dombo hill, elevation 1,455 metres (4,774 ft), and south of Dowa hill, elevation 1,386 metres (4,547 ft), on its course towards Nyazvidzi River. It meets Nyazvidzi River south-east of St Kizito School in what was known as Eastdale Tribal Trust Land.

== Historical operations ==
Sebakwe River has a rich history.

It seems Kwekwe, then spelt Que Que was called Sebakwe before the assumption of the name Que Que.

In the sixteenth century a Portuguese explorer, Fernandes, camped on the banks of the Sebakwe River not{convert|5|mi|km} from Kwekwe.

King Lobengula had some reefs along Sebakwe River marked as his claims in September 1890

The land in which Sebakwe River passed through was known as Sebakwe District. A company that developed Gaika Mine in Que Que had 437 gold claims in the then Sebakwe district and all the water used was from the Sebakwe River.

In 1914 (some records say 1880) Fred Selous shot and killed a white rhino in this river and its skull was preserved. It is in the British Museum. The image name is "Sebakwe 1914"

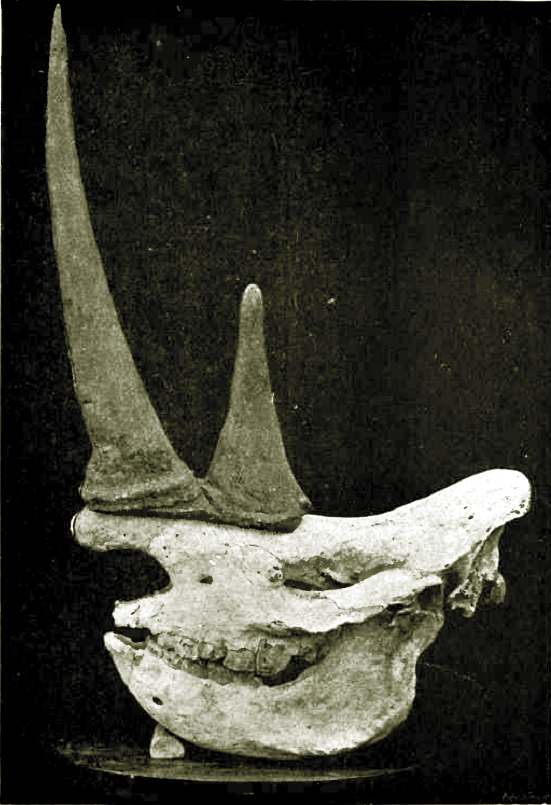
Sebakwe 1914_Skull of white rhinoceros shot by Fred Selous on the Sebakwe River in Zimbabwe

Fredrick Selous was nearly killed by a leopard in the Sebakwe River.

Sebakwe River was boundary between Mashonaland and Matabeleland when Southern Rhodesia was still a two province nation. It was also a route for travelling from the east to the Salisbury-Bulawayo Road which was west of the Enkeldoorn and Fort Charter areas. Sebakwe River had also crossing places without bridges but a ferryboat, drawn across by a wheel which travelled along the cable like an aerial car.

Many early settlers found land along Sebakwe River irresistible.

Sebakwe River has always been a source of drinking and irrigation water. It even has weirs from the 19th century some created by wagon bridges.

Sebakwe River has always been Kwekwe's life line from the onset. Que Que developed from mining compound townships for Gaika and Globe and Phoenix mines. Drinking Water for Gaika and G and P mines was ferried from Sebakwe River by ox wagon until G and P mine was granted water rights to pipeline water from the river 5.25 miles (8.45 km) away in 1898.

Sebakwe River also acted as the northern boundary of Kutanga Bombing Range in the then Rosedale Farming Area. The range was used by combat planes from Thornhill Air Base which is still in operation. Kutanga Bombing Range is situated to the South of the Midlands town called Que Que in the district area commonly known as the Bemberzaan/ Sebakwe (named after the two rivers in that area) farming community called Rosedale. This geographically placed the range north of Thornhill some 50 miles (80 km).

== Current operations ==
Sebakwe River supplies Munyati Power Station with water for boilers via a 23-kilometre (14 mi) long canal

The 266-megalitre (9.4×10^{6} cu ft) Sebakwe Dam is across Sebakwe River, and it supplies Kwekwe, Sebakwe Recreational Park and Redcliff with water.

Sebakwe Recreational Park and the Sebakwe Black Rhino Trust Conservancy conserve wildlife. The river is also dammed at Dutchman's Pool Dam, also on the Sebakwe River and a supplementary water source for Kwekwe.
