= Zimbabwe Iron and Steel Company =

Zimbabwe Iron and Steel Company is the largest steel works in Zimbabwe. It is located just outside Kwekwe, in Redcliff, Kwekwe District. Over the years the company has faced many operational problems and corruption scandals.

== History ==
In 1942, the colonial government founded the Rhodesian Iron and Steel Commission (Riscom). It was sited at the steel plant at Redcliff, to develop the huge iron and limestone deposits nearby. In 1957, it changed its name to the Rhodesian Iron and Steel Company (Risco).

It suffered from a lack of experienced personnel and low level of production which meant high unit costs. In 1954, a debt of 1.7 million pounds sterling had to be written off as irrecoverable. In 1956, the loss-making situation was turned into a profit-making situation due to the formation of the Federation of Rhodesia and Nyasaland and the denationalisation of the industry. In 1956, iron ore output from the company was 127,954 tons. By 1957, this had doubled to 257,166 tons.

In 1965, the company employed up to 2,900 people. In 1980, after Independence, it was renamed the Zimbabwe Iron and Steel Company (ZISCO). By 1990 it employed about 5,500 people and indirect employment was around 50,000. It used to export to Europe and Asia as well as neighbouring African countries.

== Problems ==
In 2000, Ziscosteel operated without a fully constituted board. Its blast furnaces were no longer functional while its plants and equipment was now obsolete. As of early 2008, the company was producing less than 12,500 tonnes, far below the break-even capacity of 25,000 tonnes. By 2010, it could hardly pay its depleted workforce. It has been claimed that more than 200 former workers have died since 2011 because they were unable to pay for medicine or hospital treatment.

It was wholly owned by the government of Zimbabwe, until in November 2010, it invited bidders for a 64% stake of the ZISCO group of companies mainly to reduce or liquidate two large debts totalling $340 million, including $240 million to a German bank. 54% of the company is now in the hands of Essar Africa Holdings Ltd (India-based). The government of Zimbabwe still holds 36% and a consortium of private investors holds 10%. Up to 3,000 jobs were saved.

The ZISCO group of companies include BIMCO, Lancashire Steel, Frontier Steel, ZISCO Distribution Centre. All these companies are 100% owned by ZISCO.

It gets raw materials (such as iron ore) from Ripple Creek mine which is about 14 kilometers from ZISCO. Up to 70 million tonnes can be mined. Up to 200 million tonnes of limestone can be found on an open cast mine which is a few meters from ZISCO. Zimbabwe also has reserves of up to 22 billion tonnes of coal.
