= Mutare Museum =

National museum in Zimbabwe

Coordinates: 18.9711°S 32.6671°E

- Established: 1959
- Location: Mutare, Zimbabwe

Mutare Museum is a museum in Mutare, Zimbabwe. It is one of the four national museums of Zimbabwe and was initially established as a society in 1954 before becoming a national museum in 1959.

== See also ==
- List of museums in Zimbabwe
