= Kwekwe stadium stampede =

2014 human crush in Kwekwe, Zimbabwe

On 21 November 2014, a stampede occurred at Mbizo Stadium in Kwekwe, Zimbabwe, killing 11 and injuring 40 people. Reuters reported that around 30,000 people attended a religious service officiated by Walter Magaya. After the service, the crowd left toward a single exit in a stampede, killing four immediately; seven others were pronounced dead at hospital. The Business Standard reported that the stampede was caused by police firing teargas after some of the crowd attempted to break off parts of the stadium wall to exit.
