= National Mining Museum, Zimbabwe =

Museum in Kwekwe, Zimbabwe

The National Mining Museum
- Location: Kwekwe, Zimbabwe

The National Mining Museum is dedicated to showcasing Zimbabwe's mining heritage. It was developed by the National Museums and Monuments of Zimbabwe. The museum is located in Kwekwe, a town in central Zimbabwe.
