= Old Bulawayo =

Coordinates: 20.3022883°S 28.6264427°E

Old Bulawayo is a historic settlement that was originally established by King Lobengula as his capital in 1870 soon after becoming king of the Matebele people. A museum was established in 1990

Old Bulawayo is being rebuilt by the National Monuments and Museums of Zimbabwe.
