= Redcliff, Zimbabwe =

Redcliff
- Coat of arms
- Nickname: reds
- Location within Zimbabwe
- Coordinates: 19°02′S 29°47′E
- Country: Zimbabwe
- Province: Midlands
- District: Kwekwe

Population (2022 census)
  - Total: 41,526
- Time zone: UTC+2 (CAT)
- Climate: Cwa

Redcliff is a town situated in the Midlands Province of Zimbabwe, with a population of 41,526 (as of 2022). It lies about 219 km (136 mi) north-east of Bulawayo.

The town sits in an extremely iron-rich area, and has relied on steel production as a source of revenue since it was founded in the early part of the 20th century. The Zimbabwe Iron and Steel Company (ZISCO, formerly RISCO, founded in 1942), which is based in Redcliff, was the town's largest employer until it closed down in 2008.

== History ==
=== Education ===
The only school in Redcliff in the 1980s was Redcliff Primary School, which offered education to children aged around 5 to 13. The school had three classes per grade classified by colours: red, blue and green. Around 1987, as the population of Redcliff increased. An additional class was added in most streams. School sports played at the school included hockey, swimming, rugby, cricket, rounders, netball and soccer.

Currently, schools in the town include, Redcliff Primary School, George Hill Primary School,, Zisco High School (formerly Drake Secondary School), Batanai High School and Rutendo High School.

=== Sports ===
The town has had sport success stories in soccer, rugby, basketball and athletics, benefitting from infrastructure including Zisco Club and Torwood "Mugomba" Stadium.

Zisco Athletics teams produced many talented athletes, Christopher Madzokere, Stanley Mandebele, Melusi Ndlela, Tinos Maridza, Patson Muderedzi, Sam Madzinga and Mark Fanucci all of whom were members of Zisco's 4×100- and 4×400-metre relay team. These five athletes represented Zisco, the Midlands province and Zimbabwe at international competitions including the 1982 Commonwealth Games in Brisbane, Australia.

== Water Reticulation ==
Redcliff has no direct water source and is provided with water via the Kwekwe network. There have been multiple problems with payments of water bills. ZiscoSteel helped in the funding of Sebakwe Dam which supplies Kwekwe with water. Since the closure of ZiscoSteel, Kwekwe has switched off Redcliff numerous times.

Since the shutdown of a major firm (Ziscosteel) the standard of living of the majority became so tough, now people are relying on buying and selling, gold panning, selling scrap metal and coal.

== See also ==
- Kwekwe
- Redcliff constituency
