= Sable Chemicals =

Zimbabwean ammonium nitrate manufacturer

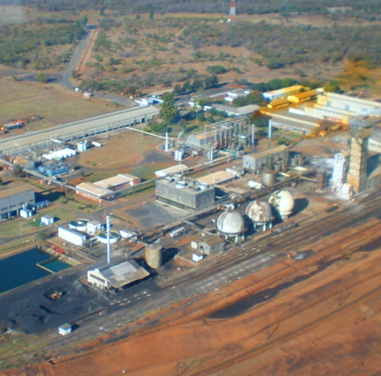
Sable Chemical Industries aerial view

Sable Chemical Industries Limited is the sole manufacturer of ammonium nitrate (NH_{4}NO_{3}) in Zimbabwe.

== History ==
Located in Kwekwe, Sable Chemical Industries Limited is Zimbabwe's sole manufacturer of nitrogen-based fertilizer, ammonium nitrate (AN). The company was incorporated in 1965 and started operations in 1969 using ammonia, a key raw material in the fertilizer making process, which at that time was imported through Sasol, South Africa. In 1972, Sable commissioned its own ammonia production facility via electrolysis of water. This saw the import quota reduce to 30% of total raw materials required to make AN. The nameplate capacity of the plant is 240,000 tonnes (240,000 long tons; 260,000 short tons) per annum of AN.

== Air separation ==
An air separation process is used to separate nitrogen from air for downstream use in the ammonia making process. By-products in the form of gaseous and liquid oxygen as well as small quantities of liquid nitrogen are formed. Five basic unit operations make up the air separation process: air compression, air purification, heat exchange, liquefaction and distillation. Nitrogen is compressed to 30 bar (3,000 kPa) prior to export to the ammonia making plant.

== Water electrolysis ==
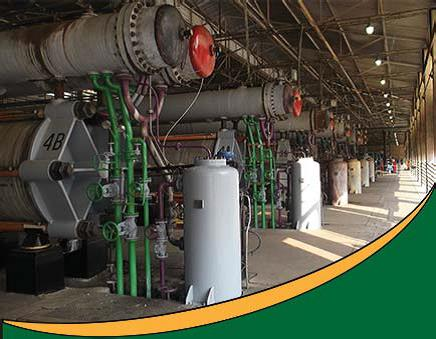
Sable Chemical Industries electrolysis plant

The purpose of the water electrolysis process is to produce hydrogen for use in ammonia making. The process consists of 14 electrolytic units. Electrolysis of water at Sable is a process whereby 6.5 kA direct current is applied across each electrolytic unit to separate water into hydrogen and oxygen both at 35 °C (95 °F) and 30 bar (3,000 kPa). An electrolyte consisting of 25% wt/wt potassium hydroxide, the other part being demineralised water, is used as feed to the electrolytic units. 90 MW (120,000 hp) are required to run all electrolytic units at capacity.

== Ammonia making ==
The ammonia making process is used for the manufacture of nitric acid and ammonium nitrate fertiliser. Using the Haber process, nitrogen from the air separation process and hydrogen water electrolysis are reacted over an iron catalyst at 320 bar (32,000 kPa) and 520 °C (968 °F) to produce ammonia gas. Ammonia is then liquefied and pumped to one of the two 1,000 storage spheres.

== Nitric acid making ==
The nitric acid process produces nitric acid for use in making ammonium nitrate fertiliser. Using the Ostwald process, ammonia is vaporised and then oxidised over a 95% platinum and 5% rhodium catalyst at 930 °C (1,710 °F) and 6.5 bar (650 kPa) to form nitric oxide and superheated steam. The reaction gases are cooled to 38 °C (100 °F) before absorption by various heat recovery mechanisms. The cooled reaction gases are then passed through the bottom of an absorption column where a stream of air is added to oxidise nitric oxide to nitrogen dioxide. As the nitrogen dioxide passes up the column, it is absorbed by a stream of water flowing from the top of the absorption column to yield the desired product (57% nitric acid) which is then stored for downstream use.

== Ammonium nitrate making ==
The ammonium nitrate making process is a neutralisation process consisting of a reaction between ammonia and nitric acid. Ammonia is vaporised and then sparged through a proportionate amount of nitric acid to make an 83% wt/wt ammonium nitrate solution. The solution is concentrated to a 99% melt by vaporising water using two evaporators in series. 0.6% magnesium oxide is added to the melt. The melt is then pumped to the top of a prill tower into a prill pot from which it is sprayed against an approaching stream of air from the bottom of the tower, in the process making solid ammonium nitrate prills. These prills are then coated with a 0.15% dolomite-based coating agent prior to bagging and dispatch.

== Going green ==
In 2010 Sable initiated the Clean Development Mechanism project in response to the ever growing concern over the environment, the first of its type in Zimbabwe.

"The Clean Development Mechanism (CDM), defined in Article 12 of the Protocol, allows a country with an emission-reduction or emission-limitation commitment under the Kyoto Protocol (Annex B Party) to implement an emission-reduction project in developing countries. Such projects can earn saleable certified emission reduction (CER) credits, each equivalent to one tonne of CO2, which can be counted towards meeting Kyoto targets."

The project is intended to reduce the emissions of nitrous oxide, a crucial greenhouse gas, from one of the Sable processes. MGM Innova and DNV Climate Change Services, consultants in CDM projects development and validation, were engaged and carried out a detailed feasibility study up to the registration of the project with the CDM Executive Board in 2012 (Project 6483: Sable Chemicals Tertiary N2O Abatement Project in Zimbabwe, 2013). Standard Bank will fund the $6m required and will recover their investment through sale of CER credits.

== Coal gasification ==
Sable has been working on reengineering its ammonia producing process whose completion is predicted to come to light in the near future. This route will result in Sable retiring the energy consuming electrolysis process, thus releasing up to 115 MW (154,000 hp) into the grid for other electricity consumers. Gasification of coal to produce hydrogen will be used to substitute the current process of electrolysis of water.
