= National Monuments of Zimbabwe =

The National Monuments of Zimbabwe are protected and promoted in accordance with the National Museums and Monuments Act 1972. This law replaced the colonial-era Monuments and Relics Act 1936, which in turn replaced the 1902 Ancient Monuments Protection Ordinance and 1912 Bushmen Relics Ordinance. The National Museums and Monuments of Zimbabwe (NMMZ) is the body responsible for maintaining the Archaeological Survey, the national inventory of monuments and sites. In April 2000 there were approximately 14,000 entries on the Archaeological Survey, of which 118 were National Monuments (including natural, cultural, and mixed sites). 79 National Monuments had been declared under the old system by 1954. By 1980, the register had grown to over 3,000 sites and 169 declared monuments.

== National Monuments ==
The National Monuments register includes the following sites:

Site	Location	Date	Comments	Coordinates	Image
Great Zimbabwe	Masvingo	11-15th centuries	UNESCO World Heritage Site	20.273063°S 30.934344°E	
Khami	Bulawayo	15-17th centuries	UNESCO World Heritage Site	20°09′30″S 28°22′36″E	
Domboshawa Cave	Domboshawa		Ancient rock art	17°36′S 31°08′E	
Ziwa	Nyanga	17-18th centuries	UNESCO Tentative List	18°08′S 32°38′E	
National Heroes' Acre	Harare	1981			
Mashonaland West Provincial Heroes' Acre	Mashonaland West		Site of the Battle of Sinoia	17.357°S 30.274°E	
Matobo Rock Art Sites	Matobo National Park		UNESCO World Heritage Site	20°33′00″S 28°30′29″E	
Tsindi					
Harleigh Farm					
Diana's Vow					
Chamavara					
Zinjanja					
Majiri					
Alter site					
Kagumbudzi					
Matendera					
Jumbo Mine					
Dambarare					
Fort Makaha					
Tohwechipi's Grave					
Statue of Mbuya Nehanda	Harare	25 May 2021	Monument		

== See also ==
- History of Zimbabwe
- Culture of Zimbabwe
- List of heritage registers
