= Mutare =

Capital city of Manicaland, Zimbabwe

Mutare Umtali
- City
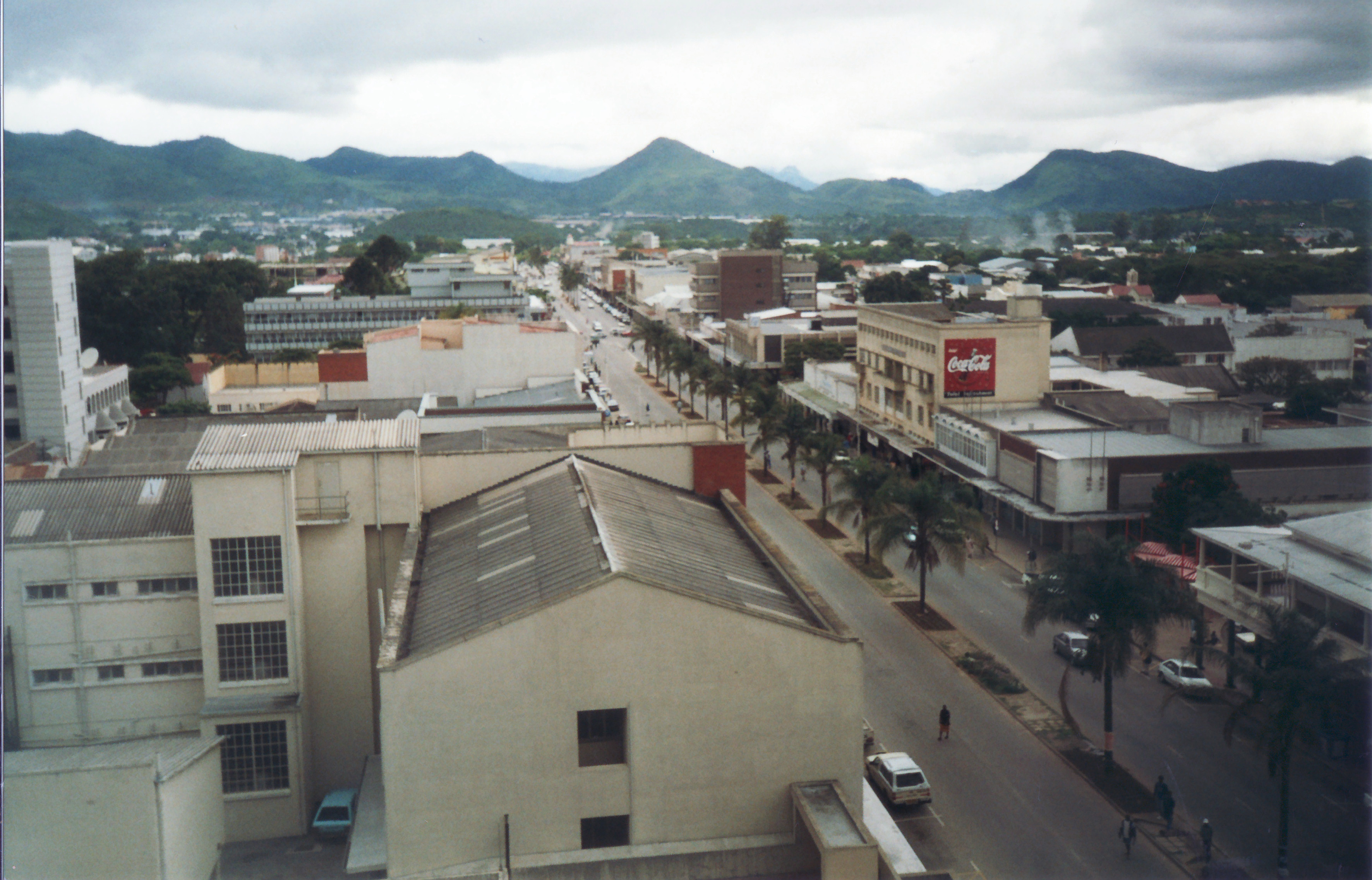
- Aerial view of Central Mutare (October 2001)

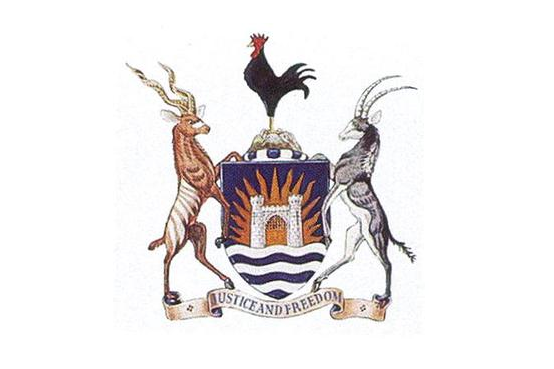
- Flag Coat of arms
- Nicknames: Gateway to the Eastern Highlands, Zimbabwe's Gateway to the Sea
- Motto: Justice and Freedom
- Location within Zimbabwe
- Coordinates: 18°58′S 32°38′E
- Country: Zimbabwe
- Province: Manicaland
- District: Mutare
- Founded: 1897
- Incorporated (town): 11 June 1914
- Incorporated (city): 1971

Government
  - Type: Mayor–council
  - Mayor: Simon Chabuka (CCC)
  - Council: Mutare City Council

Area
  - Urban: 191.2 km^{2} (73.8 sq mi)
- Elevation: 1,120 m (3,670 ft)

Population (2022 census)
  - City: 224,804
  - Rank: 3rd in Zimbawbe; 4th (Agglomeration); 3rd (Metro)
  - Urban: 240,000
  - Urban density: 1,300/km^{2} (3,300/sq mi)
  - Metro: 500,000
- estimated
- Time zone: UTC+2 (CAT)
- Climate: Cwa
- Website: City of Mutare

Mutare, known as Umtali until 1982, is the capital and largest city in the province of Manicaland. It is the third-largest city in Zimbabwe. Having surpassed Gweru in the 2012 census, with an urban population of 224,802 and approximately 260,567 in the surrounding districts, Mutare adds to the wider metropolitan area a total population of over 500,000 people. Mutare is also the capital of Manicaland Province and the largest city in eastern Zimbabwe.

Located near the border with Mozambique, Mutare has long been a centre of trade and a key terminus en route to the port of Beira (in Beira, Mozambique). Mutare is hub for trade with railway links, pipeline transport and highways linking the coast with Harare and Zimbabwe's interior. Other traditional industries include timber, papermaking, commerce, food processing, telecommunications and transportation. In addition the city serves as a gateway to the scenic Eastern Highlands, nearby Gorongosa National Park and the Mozambique coast.

== History ==
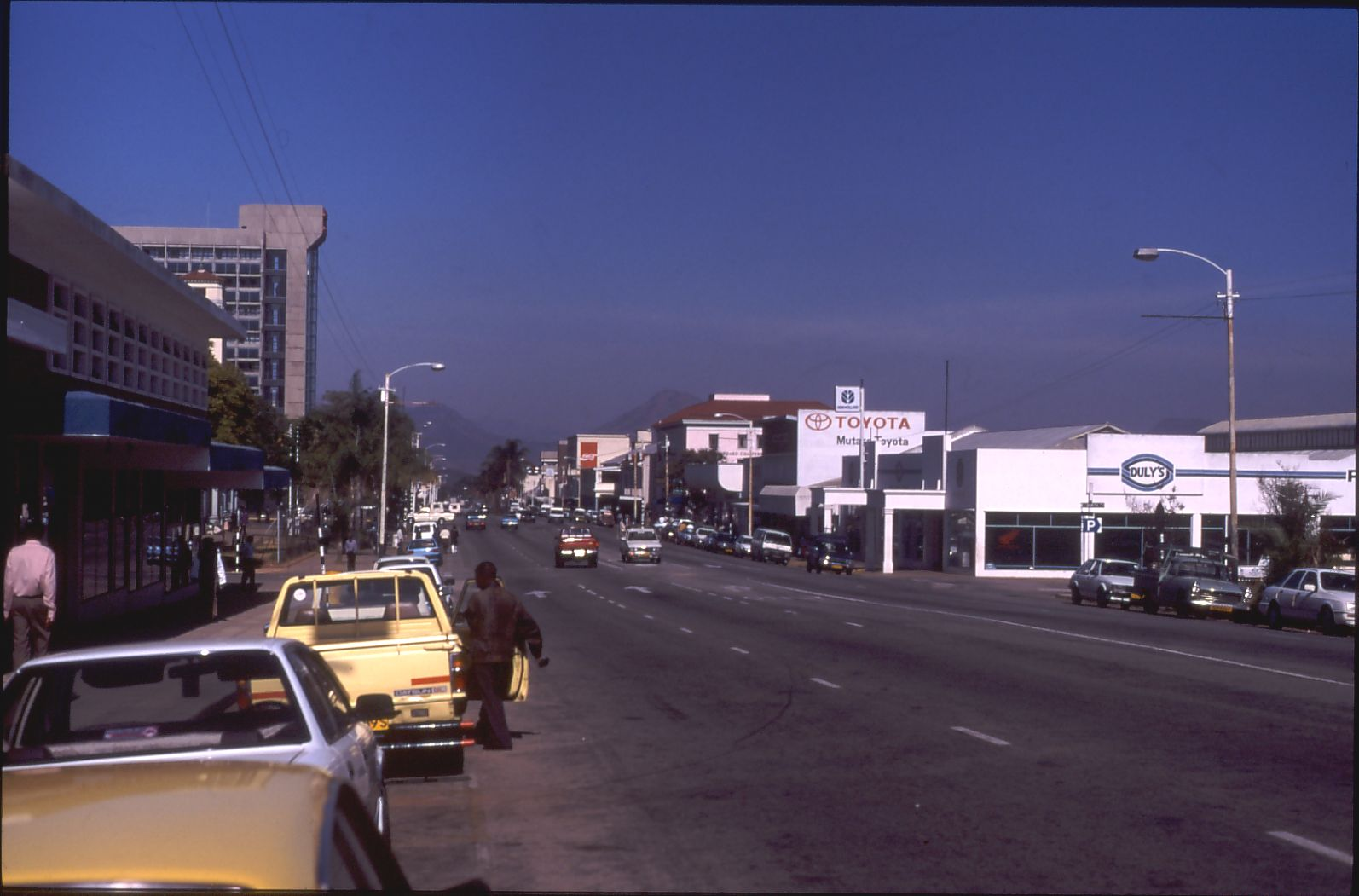
Main Street looking southwards, June 1997

Although the city was founded in the late nineteenth century, the region has a long history of trading caravans passing through on the way to the Indian Ocean, from ports such as Sofala, to inland settlements, such as Great Zimbabwe. Zimbabwe is also renowned for its soapstone carvings and figurines which are evidence of these trade routes, dating as far back as the late African Iron Age (c. 900 AD) right up to the colonial period. A large hoard of soapstone carvings, jewellery, weapons, sherds and other objects were found in the vicinity of Mutare by the British archaeologist E M Andrews at the beginning of the twentieth century - they were later donated by the trustees of Cecil Rhodes to the British Museum in 1905. The soapstone figures, which are both anthropomorphic and zoomorphic, might have been part of a votive offering, as they were discovered near what appeared to be an altar. Mutare was founded in 1897 as a fort, about 8 km (5.0 mi) from the border with Mozambique, and is just 290 km (180 mi) from the Mozambican port of Beira, earning Mutare the title of "Zimbabwe's Gateway to the Sea". It is sometimes also called "Gateway to the Eastern Highlands". Many Zimbabwean locals refer to it as 'Kumakomoyo' (place of many mountains). There is a border railway station on the railway line from Bulawayo to Beira with a railways mechanical workshop.

The area was the site of Chief Mutasa's kraal. In 1890 A. R. Coquhoun was given concessionary rights and Fort Umtali (the fort later became Mutare) was established between the Tsambe and Mutare Rivers. The word mutare originates from the word 'Utare' meaning iron (or possibly meaning gold). The name was probably given to the river as a result of gold being discovered in the Penhalonga valley through which the Mutare River runs.

In 1891 the location was moved to a site now known as Old Mutare, about 14 km north of the city centre. In 1896 the construction of the railway between Beira and Bulawayo led to the town being moved a third time so that it was closer to the railway line – compensation was paid by the British South Africa Company to the townspeople for the cost of moving. The town was proclaimed a municipality on 11 June 1914 and in 1971 it was granted city status. The name was officially changed from Umtali to Mutare in 1982.

The white population in Umtali dropped from 9,950 in 1969 to 8,600 in June 1978.

The city had a tramway from 26 January 1897 until 23 May 1921. This transported passengers from the railway station up to Umtali Club (now known as Mutare Club). The tramway was at the centre of Main Street where the palm trees now stand.

There were plans to set up a stock exchange in Umtali. The main post office was at the site where CABS centre now stands.

== Geography ==
The town lies north of the Bvumba Mountains and south of the Imbeza Valley. Christmas Pass is a mountain pass that leads into the city from the west. The pass was so named by some of the colonial pioneers who camped at the foot of the pass on Christmas Day 1890. The pass features a winding, dual-carriageway road with scenic views of the surrounding Eastern Highlands.

Mutare is home to several tourist attractions such as, the Mutare Museum, the Utopia House Museum dedicated to Kingsley Fairbridge, the National Gallery of Zimbabwe, Murahwa Hill, known for its rock paintings and Iron Age village, Cross Kopje with a memorial to Zimbabweans and Mozambicans killed in World War I and a nature reserve Cecil Kopje and Tigers Kloof. The Mutare Boys' High Chapel was constructed in honour of former Old boys who perished in World War II, situated on a hilly knoll at Mutare Boys High (then Umtali Boys High).

Mutare is served by rail with daily passenger and freight links to Nyazura, Rusape and Harare.

There are three small aerodromes; the smallest is at Mutare Provincial Hospital, a very small light aircraft strip for emergency evacuation (now defunct), a light plane aerodrome in Sakubva near Mutare Teachers College and the Grand Reef Airport just outside the city at Irene. There is a fourth airport, which was constructed in Chiadzwa to carry diamonds for processing in Harare.

=== Climate ===
Despite its tropical location, the city has a humid subtropical climate, of the highland variety moderated by its altitude. Mutare experiences drizzle almost throughout the year. The average annual temperature is 19 °C, surprisingly low for its moderate altitude (about the same as Harare which is 360 metres higher.) This is due to its sheltered position against the mountain ridge of Cecil Kop which encourages cool breezes from lower altitude to the east and south. The coldest month is July (minimum 6 °C and maximum 20 °C) and the hottest month is October (minimum 16 °C and maximum 32 °C). The annual rainfall is 818 mm. Rain falls mostly in the months December to February, although heavy showers are possible before and after this period. The wettest month on record was January 1926 which received 580 mm while January 1991 received only 24 mm.

The city's climate is also influenced by its proximity to the ocean, compared to other Zimbabwean cities. This leads to warm-to-hot summers and mild winters. Winter is not particularly frosty with cool mornings often followed by mild sunny weather. Spring can feature "four seasons in a day" weather, but from March to June it is generally settled and mild. Temperatures during summer can reach 30 °C (86 °F). Due to its maritime influence, Mutare's temperate climate stands out considering its latitude. Prevailing winds in the city are mainly a cool, moist southeasterly and during late spring and winter alternating with subtropical winds from the north in summer.

Climate data for Mutare
Month	Jan	Feb	Mar	Apr	May	Jun	Jul	Aug	Sep	Oct	Nov	Dec	Year
Mean daily maximum °C (°F)	27.6 (81.7)	26.8 (80.2)	26.3 (79.3)	25.2 (77.4)	23.7 (74.7)	21.4 (70.5)	21.2 (70.2)	23.2 (73.8)	26.1 (79.0)	27.0 (80.6)	27.5 (81.5)	27.1 (80.8)	25.3 (77.5)
Mean daily minimum °C (°F)	17.5 (63.5)	16.3 (61.3)	15.6 (60.1)	13.9 (57.0)	10.6 (51.1)	8.0 (46.4)	7.6 (45.7)	9.3 (48.7)	12.2 (54.0)	14.6 (58.3)	16.1 (61.0)	16.9 (62.4)	13.2 (55.8)
Average rainfall mm (inches)	153.5 (6.04)	164.5 (6.48)	88.4 (3.48)	31.8 (1.25)	12.4 (0.49)	8.9 (0.35)	5.8 (0.23)	6.0 (0.24)	20.2 (0.80)	45.9 (1.81)	86.4 (3.40)	167.0 (6.57)	790.8 (31.13)
Average rainy days	13	11	10	4	3	2	2	2	2	5	8	12	74
Source: World Meteorological Organization

== Demographics ==
Mutare racial makeup, 1965
1. Black (78.5%)
2. White (19.8%)
3. Asian (1.22%)
4. Coloured (0.74%)

Historical population
Year	Pop.	±%
1936	3,566	—
1941	4,812	+34.9%
1951	10,900	+126.5%
1965	46,000	+322.0%
1974	48,000	+4.3%
1982	69,621	+45.0%
1992	131,367	+88.7%
2002	170,466	+29.8%
2012	260,567	+52.9%
2022	224,802	−13.7%

In 1965, Mutare had a population of 46,000. The racial makeup was split between 36,100 black Africans, 560 Asians, 340 Coloureds and 9,100 whites.

The population is predominantly Shona, the majority of them speaking the Manyika dialect. Manyika people are locally known as Samanyika. According to the 2012 census data, Mutare has a population of 260,567. This marks a rapid increase from a population of 69,621 in 1982 and 131,367 in 1992.

== Cityscape ==
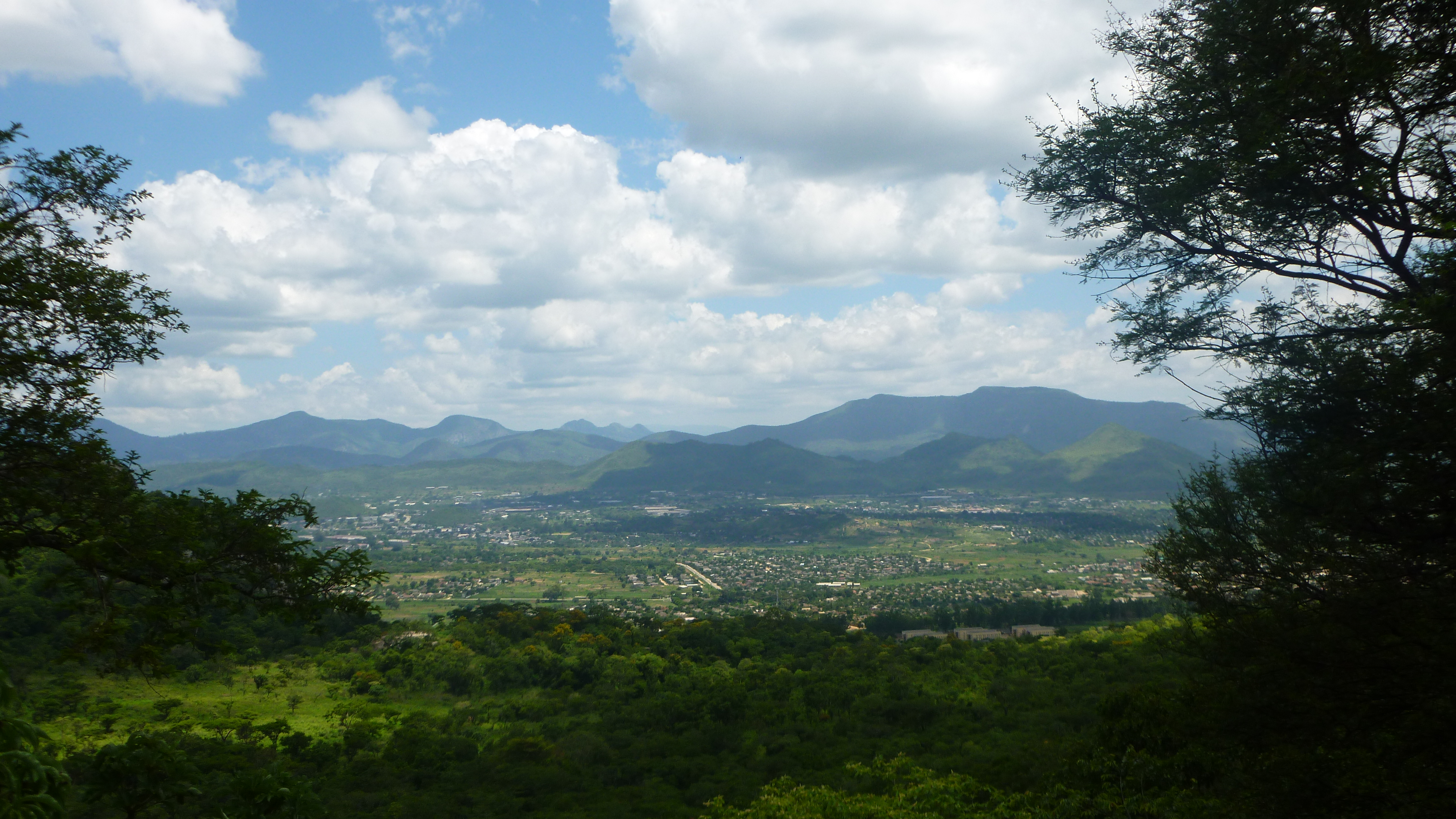
Greater Mutare as viewed from Christmas Pass

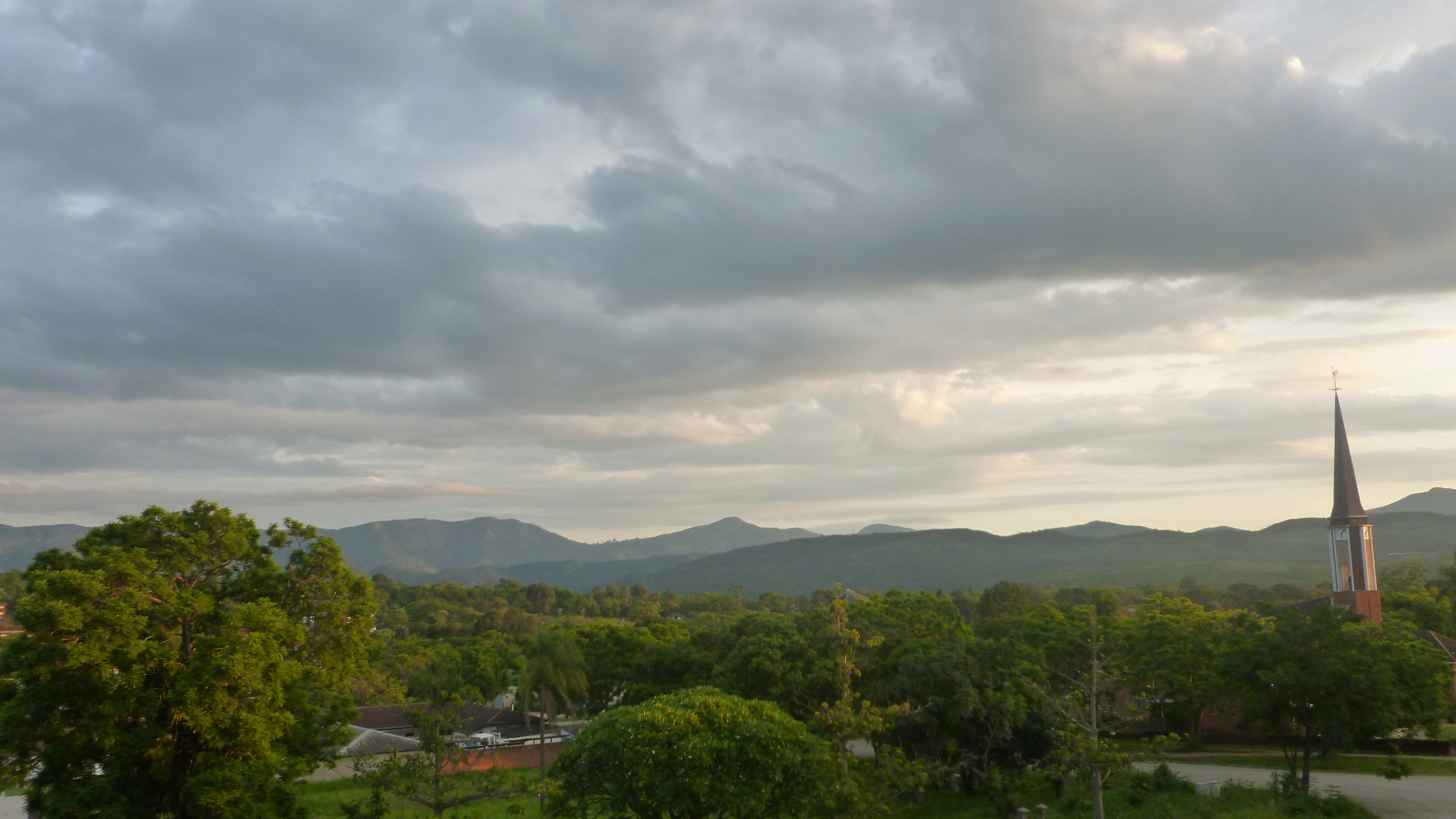
Mutare East

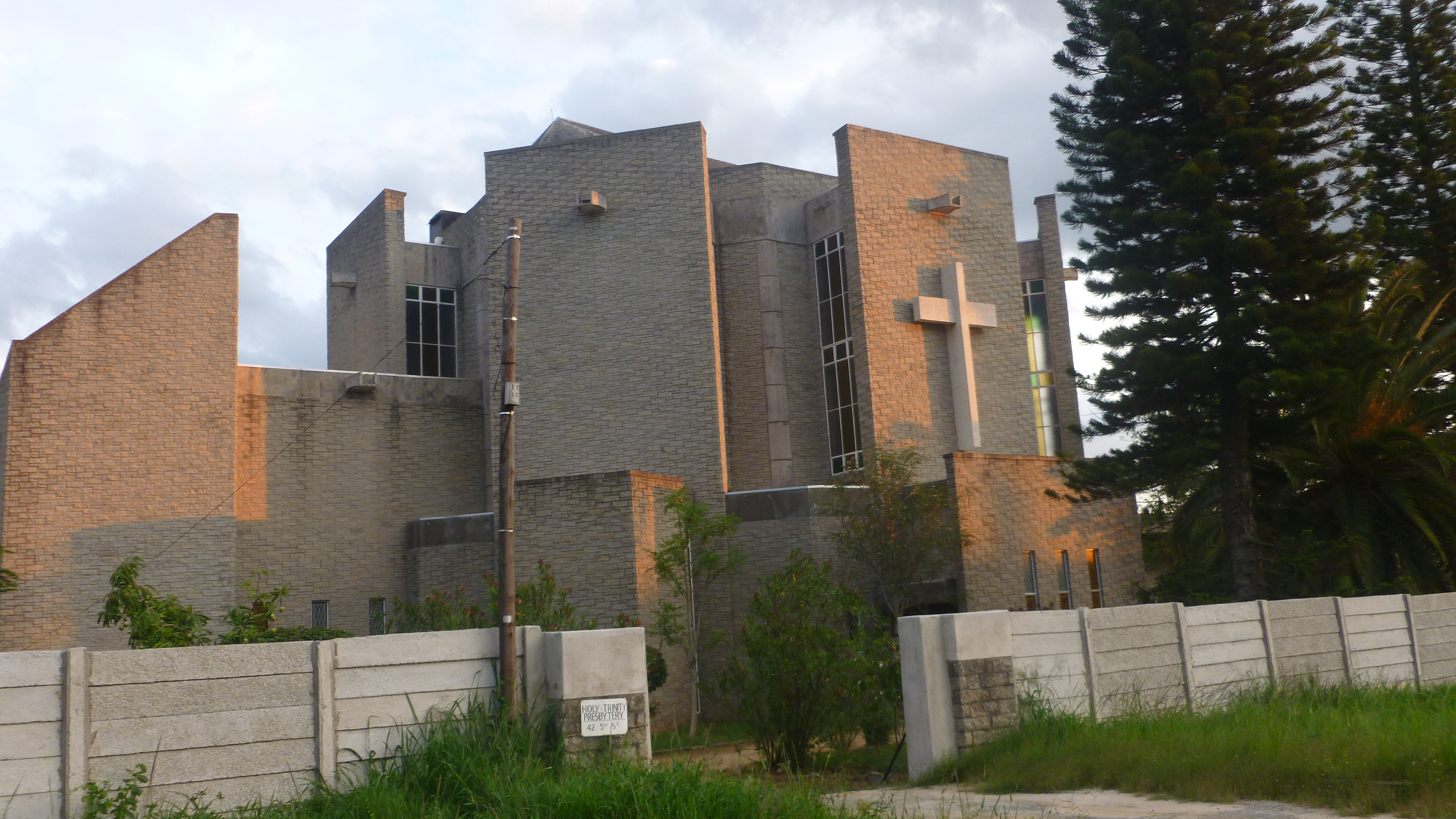
Mutare Catholic Church

Mutare, like most cities in Zimbabwe, classifies residential suburbs according to population density: Low density, Medium density and High density. In the past, as was done across Southern Africa during the colonial period, people were segregated to suburbs according to their racial ethnicity. Whites inhabited the Eastern upmarket suburbs the low-density suburbs, with Coloured people (mixed race) living in suburbs like Florida and black Africans being segregated to the townships of Sakubva and Dangamvura.

The most upscale suburbs (low-density suburbs) such as Murambi, Fairbridge Park, Morningside, Tiger's Kloof and the Avenues are located on the north and east ends of the city. The suburb of Avenues is found just east of the city centre on the way to Tiger's Kloof and Murambi, bordering Morningside.

East of the CBD is the suburbs of Palmerstone, Darlington, Greenside and Bordervale, which are all near the border with Mozambique.

In the west are the medium-density (i.e. middle class) suburbs, the largest and most famous being Yeovil - (the majority of street names in Yeovil are named after English counties e.g. Sussex Gardens, Hampshire, Devonshire, Somerset). Then more recently developed after Yeovil is Westlea (the majority all streets in Westlea are named after Australasian cities, (e.g. Canberra, Auckland, Sydney, Perth and Christchurch) and Florida (the streets in Florida have English Kings' names, e.g. Henry, Alfred, Richard, George), as well as the high-density suburb of Chikanga, which was constructed in phases, beginning in the late eighties.

Further west of Chikanga lies Garikai, Bernwin and Hobhouse. South of the railway tracks, is the working class suburb of Sakubva, which contains nearly half of the city's population despite an area of less than four square miles. Sakubva is considered to be the poorest of Mutare's suburbs, and its economy is centred around a large outdoor food and flea market and the "Musika weHuku" (The Chicken Market). The market has been recently razed in the recent exercise to clean up the city and in light of the COVID-19 pandemic and moved elsewhere.

South of the city, hidden from view from the rest of the city by a series of hills, is the high-density suburb of Dangamvura. The affluent areas of Weirmouth (Plots) and Fern Valley are also on the southern outskirts of the city; in these areas, residential lots exceed an acre, and market gardening is an economic activity. Nearby Fern Valley, is home to the new state university, the Manicaland College of Applied Sciences.

To the south east, in the mountains from the Prince of Wales viewpoint (with views of Mozambique below), lies the scenic Bvumba Mountain range, which has a temperate climate due to its location on the Great Rift Valley. The Bvumba mountain range is home to indigenous afromontane forests, exotic trees, such as pine and oak. The range has an upscale resort called the Leopard Rock Hotel, as well as other resort areas for horse riding, kayaking, mountain climbing trails. In industry this area has a food processing plant and large plantations of pine and wattle forests.

Further south along the road to Masvingo, beyond the city limits is the high-density town of Zimunya. Mutare's main industrial areas lie south of the railway and west of Sakubva, although there is some light industry just east of the southern part of the city centre at "Greenmarket" and surrounding areas.

These are some of the major suburbs of Mutare.

Region	Suburbs
Northern (North of the railway line)	Murambi; Fairbridge Park; Morningside; Tiger's Kloof; Palmerston; Avenues; Utopia; Darlington; Greenside; Greenside Extension, Yeovil; Westlea; Florida; Toronto; Bordervale.Chikanga
Southern (South of the railway line)	Sakubva; Dangamvura; St Josephs Park-Chikanga Extension, Weirmouth; Fern Valley; Zimunya; Hobhouse(1,2,3)extension; Natview Park, Garikai.

== Infrastructure ==
The city has one of the most important railway stations on the Beira–Bulawayo railway.

Mutare is generally a clean town with the city council collecting rubbish daily. Most of the roads in the older parts of the city are (or previously were) paved; however, due to years of neglect, mismanagement and corruption, public infrastructure is in a shambles, with roads and street lighting in a critical state.

There is a main park in the city just before the cricket grounds that is also underutilised and not in good shape. A game park called the Cecil Kop is located in Tigers Kloof and also lacks proper management.

Most of the buildings in the city are low-rise buildings with the tallest being 8 floors high. The city has a pleasant ambience. There are generally no sidewalks on all roads outside the city centre and the downtown area seems more dilapidated and neglected. The post-independent city council does not seem to have strict building codes for new office and commercial buildings in the city centre which would allow for the expansion of high and modern architecture for a growing city that aims to match global standards.

Mutareans, like most of Zimbabweans, prefer to live in houses made of brick, usually brick under tile or asbestos. There are no shanty towns, shacks or squatter camps in Mutare as they are illegal and residents could face penalties or demolition for not building houses to code. As the city expands and develops, the town planners have not considered playgrounds for children, street naming, pedestrian pavements, cycle tracks, proper drainage and flora (tree-lined streets) in their planning of new suburbs generally resulting in unpleasant-looking narrow neighbourhood streets.

There have been problems with wastewater treatment, meaning that at times untreated wastewater runs into the river in Sakubva township.

There are clinics in all suburbs as well as a main general hospital and infectious diseases hospital. Maternity hospitals are also available in the city.

=== Transportation ===
Mutare is well-connected by several roads which are asphalted and decent, but potholes are increasingly common. The A3 motorway leads inland towards Harare and also passes through Rusape and Marondera, while the A9 turns southward into the southern Eastern Highlands and Chimanimani. To the east is EN9 which connects Mutare to Chimoio and with the coastal city of Beira. Traffic is often heavy since this is one of Zimbabwe's main routes to the sea. There is also a lot of cross-border traffic with people visiting the nearby cities of Manica and Chimoio.

Commuter buses are a popular way of travelling for traffic across the border and from outlying villages. Higher quality intercity buses are also available to both Harare and Beira, Mozambique.

Mutare is served by a small airport that is largely geared toward small aircraft and chartered flights. The nearest international gateway is in Harare, some 214 km (133 mi) west. There is the Aerodrome close to sakubva and the Grand Reef Airport in Irene just a short distance outside the city.

The National Railways of Zimbabwe serves Mutare with overnight train service from Harare three times a week, leaving Harare at 9:30PM on Wednesdays, Fridays and Sundays, arriving early the next morning at dawn. There are no cross-border rail services from Mozambique, which are limited to freight. The Mutare railway station is just southwest of the city centre.

== Economy ==
The main activities of the area are farming, forestry, dairy, horticulture, mining, manufacturing, services - the city's name Mutare is derived from "metal" Utare possibly gold which used to be smelted by the indigenous population for centuries - and forestry. Two of the largest food producers in Zimbabwe, Cairns Foods and Tanganda Tea, operate in Mutare.

Mining includes gold at Redwing Mine, Penhalonga and some smaller mines, diamonds in Marange and gravel quarries around the city. There are a number of forestry companies including The Wattle Company, Allied Timbers, formerly FCZ, Border Timbers and Timcon Investments. The main timber products include rough sawn timber, wattle bark, charcoal, various doors and frames and mouldings. The major timber produced is pine, Sydney blue gum, black wattle and some hardwoods on a smaller scale. The railway is linked to Mocambique and is Zimbabwes gateway to the sea. The rail system however requires revamping and also including flyovers tunnels and or underpasses to avoid interaction with road traffic. Mutare has numerous hotels including Holiday Inn, Golden Peacock, Mountview, Eastgate and numerous lodges. There are a number of new manufacturing companies such as Willowton which manufactures edible oils, margari Mutare has a vehicle assembly Quest which assembles buses, trucks and other vehicles.

There are also numerous retail outlets, stationery shops, fuel service stations, computer equipment sellers e.g. EMachines, Mutare Computers, Discount Cash & Carry, There are a number of freight companies e.g. Tinmac, EMaster, Mantray, Augastalane Freight, Madziro, Tisu Anhu Acho among others. Banks in Mutare include Stanbic Bank a member of Standard Bank group, CBZ, Nedbank, MBCA, Agribank, POSB, Cabs, Ecobank, BancABC, FBC, First Capital formerly Barclays. Standard Chartered has closed shop in Mutare Civic Center is the Mutare city council headquarters. It issues licenses e.g. shop licences, parking licenses, dog licensing, housing, industry planning certification online and other local authority by law certifications. Mutare has a small aerodrome that services small aircraft, helicopters. The city is in dire need of a proper airport for meaningful tourism to occur. There is also need for improved road networks, shopping mall/s and improved social amenities.

== Education ==
Mutare is home to schools and tertiary institutions :

=== Primary education ===
- Baring Primary School
- Chancellor Junior School
- Chikanga Primary School
- Cross Kopje Junior School
- Chirovakamwe
- Dangamvura Primary School
- Hillcrest Preparatory School (Private school)
- Mutanda Primary School
- Mutare Junior School
- New Dangare Primary School
- Rujeko Primary School
- Sakubva Primary School
- Rock of Ages Private Junior School
- Murahwa Hill Primary School
- St Joseph's Primary School
- Sheni Primary School
- Zamba Primary School
- Zimunya Primary School
- Sacred Heart Primary School
- Chisamba Primary School
- Matika Primary School
- Joshua Dhube Primary School
- Zhawari Primary School
- Dangare primary School
- Mutukwa primary School
- Hartzell Central Primary School
- Elim Primary School Penhalonga
- Imbeza Primary School

=== Secondary education ===
- Hartzell High School
- Chikanga Secondary School
- Dangamvura High School
- Elise Gledhill High School
- Hillcrest College (private school)
- Mutare Boys' High School
- Mutare Girls' High School
- Nyamauru High School
- Sakubva High School (Dangwe)
- Sakubva High 2 School (Rushingo)
- St Dominic's High School
- St Joseph's High School
- St Mary's Secondary School

There are a number of private colleges around the city.

=== Tertiary institutions ===
- Africa University, a pan-African United Methodist–funded university of about 5,000 students
- Marymount Teachers' College
- Mutare Teachers College
- Mutare Polytechnic
- Magamba Training Centre
- Manicaland State University of Applied Sciences
- Zimbabwe College of Forestry

== Notable residents ==
- Washington Arubi - professional footballer
- Shacky Timburwa - Zimbabwean businessman
- Onismor Bhasera - professional footballer, formerly at Plymouth Argyle in England, now with SuperSport United F.C. in South Africa
- Herbert Chitepo - (15 June 1923 – 18 March 1975), Zimbabwe's first black lawyer and Chairman of ZANU July 1963 – 18 March 1975
- Genius Chidzikwe - tennis player
- Stephen Courtauld - philanthropist
- Mario Frangoulis - Greek classical singer
- Godfrey Herbert - Royal Navy officer of both world wars.
- Willard Katsande - professional footballer with Kaizer Chiefs
- Adiel Kugotsi - professional cricketer
- Donal Lamont - Catholic bishop of Umtali/Mutare 1957–82, an outspoken opponent of the Ian Smith government; expelled from Rhodesia in 1977 after a high-profile trial
- Trevor Madondo - (1976–2001), one of the first black cricket players in Zimbabwe
- Blessing Makunike (24 January 1977 – 13 March 2004) - professional footballer with CAPS United and Zimbabwe national team
- Supa Mandiwanzira - Minister of Information, Media and Broadcasting Services
- Chiwoniso Maraire (5 March 1976 – 24 July 2013) - an accomplished Mbira player, singer, songwriter, and exponent of Zimbabwean mbira music
- Agrippa Masiyakurima - businessman, philanthropist, and politician
- Tino Mawoyo - Zimbabwean cricketer, born and raised in Mutare
- C.W. Mercer - British author who wrote under the pen name Dornford Yates; lived near the city from 1948 until his death in 1960
- Bjorn Mordt - cricketer
- Opa Muchinguri - government minister
- Lawrence Mudehwe - the first Executive Mayor to be elected as an independent candidate in Zimbabwe; served for two terms
- Arthur Mutambara - former Deputy Prime Minister of Zimbabwe on 11 February 2009
- Bishop Abel Tendekayi Muzorewa - prime minister of Zimbabwe Rhodesia
- Tichafa Samuel Parirenyatwa (1927–1962) - Zimbabwe's first black medical doctor
- Douglas Rogers - journalist and memoirist was born in the city in 1968 and raised there
- Edgar Tekere (1937–2011) - politician
- Morgan Tsvangirai - ex-Prime Minister and MDC opposition leader
- Farai Tumbare - Zimbabwean basketball player
- Dion Yatras - professional cricketer
