= Kwekwe =

City in the Midlands province, Zimbabwe

Kwekwe Que Que
- City
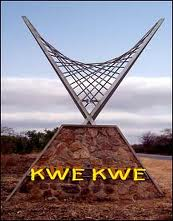
- Main Street

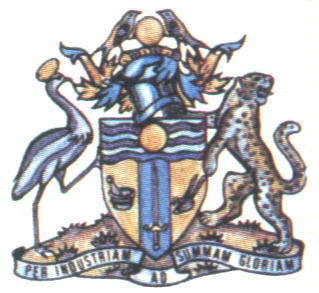
- Coat of arms
- Nicknames: Kwelaz, City of Gold
- Motto: The Now City in Touch with Tomorrow
- Location within Zimbabwe
- Coordinates: 18°55′S 29°49′E
- Country: Zimbabwe
- Province: Midlands
- District: Kwekwe
- Established: 1898

Government
  - Type: City council
  - Mayor: Future Titora
  - Member of Parliament, MP: JUDITH TOBAIWA
- Elevation: 1,220 m (4,000 ft)

Population (2022 census)
  - Total: 119,863
- Time zone: UTC+2 (CAT)
- Area code: 055
- Climate: BSh
- Website: http://www.kwekwecity.org.zw/

Kwekwe (/ˈkwɛkwɛ/ KWEH-kweh), formerly known as Que Que, is a city in the Midlands province in central Zimbabwe. The city has a population of 119,863 within the city limits, as of the 2022 census, making it the 7th-largest city in Zimbabwe and the second-most populous city in the Midlands, behind Gweru.

== Location ==
It is located in Kwekwe District, in the Midlands, in the centre of the country, roughly equidistant from Harare to the northeast and Bulawayo to the southwest. It has witnessed robust population growth since the 1980s, growing from 47,607 in 1982, 75,425 in 1992 and the preliminary result of the 2002 census suggests a population of 88,000. In 2012, the city's population was estimated at 100,900 people. It is home to significant steel and fertiliser production.

Kwekwe and neighbouring Redcliff are the headquarters of Zimbabwe Iron and Steel Company (ZISCO), the country's largest steelworks. It also hosts the Zimbabwe Iron and Smelting Company (ZIMASCO), the largest ferrochrome producer, and one of the biggest power generating plants, ZPC-Munyati, in Munyati, a suburb of Kwekwe. Kwekwe houses the headquarters of Zimbabwe's largest steelworks, and the country's largest ferrochrome producer.

== History ==
The town was founded in 1898 as a gold mining town, and hosts Zimbabwe's National Mining Museum. Like much of the Midlands, KweKwe owes its prosperity to the Great Dyke and its mineral wealth which stretches down to Gwanda, some 500 km southwest. The towns name originates from the large population of croaking frogs that populated the Kwekwe river in the early 1900s, hence its original name Que Que. The promise of wealth at the time attracted thousands of speculators from as far afield as Australia and New Zealand. Though the amount of gold found was underwhelming, deposits of chrome, and the production of iron, steel, aluminum and glass, have kept the city growing since.

KweKwe remains an industrial centre of the country. The name stems from the Zulu word "isikwekwe", which means "scurvy", "mange" or "scab". In recent years, the area has attempted to diversify its economic base to education, tourism, and services, attracting a growing campus of Midlands State University, though its tourism industry remains at infancy, compared to larger cities. Although Kwekwe has successfully diversified its economy and continues to grow, especially compared to de-industrialising Bulawayo, the city continues to face the same economic challenges facing the rest of the country.

== Geography ==
The town is situated on Zimbabwe's Highveld at an altitude of 1,220 metres (4,000 ft), above sea level. It is located in the tropics but its high altitude modifies this to a warm temperate or humid subtropical climate.

The average annual temperature is 19 °C (66 °F). As with much of the Highveld, summers are long and pleasant, as the temperature depends on the amount of cloudiness and indirectly the amount of rain received. Drought years are hotter than wetter years. The climate is hot and wet during the summer rainy season from mid November to mid March, with cool, dry weather from May to mid-August in the winter season, and warm dry weather from August to mid November. During summertime, the average temperature is around 25 °C (77 °F) at daytime, but it can get above 30 °C (86 °F) on the hottest days.

Winters are characterised mainly by their cold nights, with an average minimum temperature of 7 °C (45 °F), and are the sunniest time of the year. During winter, cold fronts from the Indian Ocean to the southeast, bringing cool, drizzly weather, often peaking in August and early September. They can move very quickly, bringing cloudy weather one day, followed by mild sunshine the next. Kwekwe's weather is also influenced by the air masses from the north in summer, bringing hot and dry weather in October, followed by summer rain.

Climate data for Kwekwe (1961–1990)
Month	Jan	Feb	Mar	Apr	May	Jun	Jul	Aug	Sep	Oct	Nov	Dec	Year
Mean daily maximum °C (°F)	28.4 (83.1)	28.2 (82.8)	28.3 (82.9)	27.6 (81.7)	25.5 (77.9)	25.5 (77.9)	23.3 (73.9)	26.0 (78.8)	29.5 (85.1)	31.1 (88.0)	29.5 (85.1)	28.3 (82.9)	27.6 (81.7)
Mean daily minimum °C (°F)	16.9 (62.4)	16.5 (61.7)	15.0 (59.0)	12.8 (55.0)	8.7 (47.7)	8.7 (47.7)	5.9 (42.6)	7.8 (46.0)	11.7 (53.1)	15.2 (59.4)	16.5 (61.7)	16.9 (62.4)	12.7 (54.9)
Average rainfall mm (inches)	158.7 (6.25)	119.1 (4.69)	62.6 (2.46)	29.1 (1.15)	5.3 (0.21)	2.0 (0.08)	0.5 (0.02)	0.4 (0.02)	5.4 (0.21)	24.8 (0.98)	85.4 (3.36)	144.6 (5.69)	637.9 (25.11)
Average rainy days	13	10	6	3	0	0	0	0	1	4	9	13	59
Source: World Meteorological Organization

== Culture and recreation ==
Kwekwe is known for its social life and cultural diversity. Its political atmosphere is generally relaxed. The city is home to people from various ethnic and lingu backgrounds such as the Shona, Ndebele, Chewa, Venda, Tonga language and Nambya speaking people.

Association football, cricket and rugby union are the main sports in the city, much like the rest of the country. Kwekwe hosts one of Zimbabwe's major provincial cricket sides – the Mid West Rhinos. Their cricket ground has been host to several first class and one day matches, and has even hosted some internationals, most notably against Kenya. Kwekwe also hosts a variety of touring sides versus Zimbabwe 'A' teams. Almost all of the schools in Kwekwe play cricket.

Kwekwe hosts Kwekwe United, who as of 2025 play in the Zimbabwe Premier Soccer League (PSL). Other clubs that have been based in Kwekwe include Lancashire Steel (named after a local steel company), Kwekwe Cables and Hardrock FC, owned by Shepherd Chahwanda, who is partnering the construction of the 15,000-seater Chahwanda Stadium. The Kwekwe Queens Club is also a reputable sporting establishment, with a sizeable membership and drinking crowd. Lancashire Steel FC was relegated from the PSL in 2008, and played at the Baghdad Stadium.

Golf tournaments are hosted by Kwekwe Golf Club.

Tongai Moyo, and Bob Nyabinde are popular singers in the country who hail from Kwekwe. Bantu Entertainment Zimbabwe is one of the city's arts and culture promotion stable that is fighting to develop the performing arts in the city. Kwekwe is a major stop for many music groups in the country who perform at Mbizo Stadium. The cricketer Charles Coventry also hails from Kwekwe – he is best known for equaling the ODI World Record of 194 runs in an innings. The city is also the birthplace of former cricketer Norman Featherstone.

A stampede at Mbizo Stadium killed 11 people in 2014.

== Education ==
Kwekwe is well endowed with many educational facilities. Most are state-run. For university education, the closest facilities are 60 km away in Gweru, the Midlands Province capital, at Midlands State University.

=== Primary and secondary education ===
Like most urban areas in the country, the city of Kwekwe hosts dozens of schools. Amaveni High School, Mbizo High School and Manunure High School recently expanded to offer A-level classes. Amaveni High serves the high density suburb of Amaveni while Mbizo and Manunure serve the high density suburb of Mbizo. Shungu High School is located about 16 km from Kwekwe. It is a Catholic run school. The middle-class suburbs close to the city centre have Kwekwe High School and Goldridge College, plus the primary schools including Goldridge Primary School, Fitchlea Primary School, Kwekwe Junior High School and Globe & Phoenix Primary School, Maryward Primary School and Sally Mugabe Primary School. There is almost one primary school for about four sections of the high density areas

==== Tertiary education ====
Kwekwe Polytechnic and Midlands State University, Kwekwe are the city's major tertiary educational institutions. Sable Chemicals and ZISCO Steel run apprenticeship programs with the polytechnic and with other universities in Zimbabwe. Recently the polytechnic has started offering B-tech degrees. Plans are underway to convert it into a modern university.

== Cityscape ==
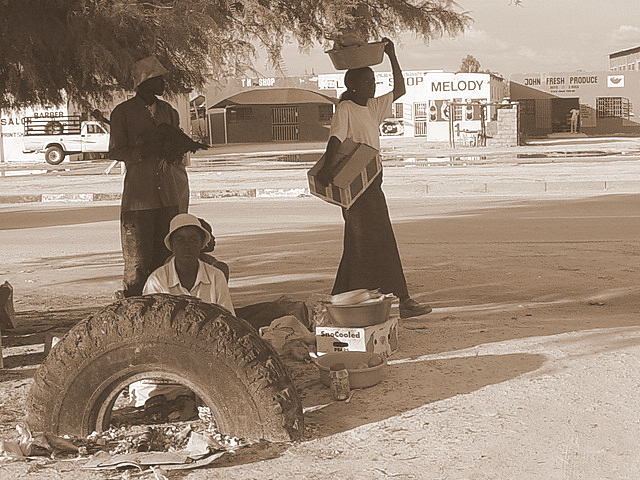
A scene close to the bus terminus in Kwekwe, 2006

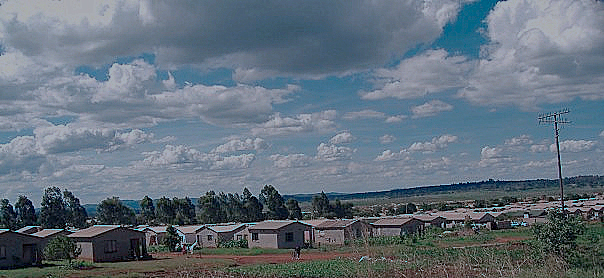
Mbizo One Extension, a new addition to one of the oldest suburbs in the town, 2006

The residential suburbs in the city are divided into higher and lower density areas. The main suburbs in the town are Mbizo Township, Amaveni Township, Msasa Park, Goldridge, Hillandale, Newtown, Gaika, Beverly Hills, Chicago, Golden Acres, Southwood and Fitchlea.

Kwekwe's suburbs are divided into low cost housing, residential housing and also industrial and railway housing. Kwekwe has only one set of traffic lights which are just outside the city centre on a road leading to the high density suburb of Mbizo.

Amaveni Township and Mbizo Township are low-cost housing suburbs. These two low-income areas were primarily built close to the mines for the use of mineworkers, and the most successful businesses, especially local bars known as beer halls, serve this customer base. Then there are the middle-class homes in the Fitchlea area. This area is made up of big three- and four-bedroom homes and is still home to wealthy families despite the collapse of the economy.

Masasa Park and New Town are among the wealthier suburbs. The very wealthy upper-class families reside mugomo (on the mountain) in the suburb of Chicago although New Town is considered the richest area in the town. This is subdivided into mini-suburbs such as Hazeldene. The homes in this area are significantly larger than most, and are usually staffed with 2–4 domestic workers and, at times, security guards.

The town lies on the Bulawayo–Harare railway line. It is home to two mosques, a meetinghouse for the Church of Jesus Christ of Latter-day Saints, and Seventh-day Adventist, Salvation Army, Protestant and Catholic churches.

Kwekwe has paved roads leading to Gweru, Kadoma, Mvuma and Gokwe Business Centre hence it is considered a well-connected city. Besides being close to the geographical centre of the country, Kwekwe is also strategically located within the Midlands metropolitan area. Kwekwe, together with Gweru, Munyati, Kadoma and Redcliff form a single customer base for local commercial enterprises.

== Economy ==
As elsewhere in Zimbabwe, a growing proportion of the population depends on the informal sector, possibly more than half of the population. Many self-employed miners carry out unauthorised digging work just north of the city, panning for gold, one of the most lucrative sources of income. Other residents engage in less strenuous work as cobblers, carpenters, TV and radio repairmen, and vendors selling anything from onions to meat.

=== Mining ===
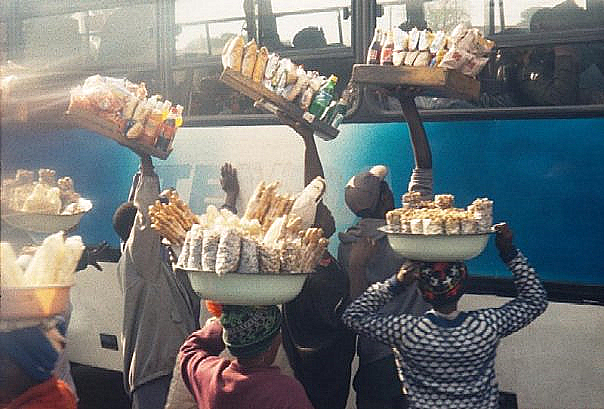
Part of the informal sector in the town: vendors selling snacks to travellers in a bus

Gold is mined in the city, and is the reason the city was established. At one stage, the Globe and Phoenix Mine around which the town developed (circa 1900) was the biggest gold mine in the country. In the local mining museum on its premises stands a relic of these boom days called the Paper House, a wood and reinforced cardboard structure in striking green and white. This two-bedroom dwelling on stilts (presumably to combat the heat and protect from termites) was home to the first mine manager, and was once slept in by Cecil John Rhodes, the colonial empire builder who was closely connected with the early development of Rhodesia (Zimbabwe's former name). Kwekwe was originally a gold mining camp and is today characterised by the large mines in its vicinity producing gold, and the chrome ore and iron ore used in steelmaking.

Four gold deposits within the Kwekwe district have been studied. The Primrose and Globe and Phoenix gold deposits display typical features of Archean orogenic lode gold systems such as fluid inclusions with low salinity, mixed aqueous-carbonic fluids, formation temperatures between 300 and 400 °C, and a common stable isotope composition of fluid and mineral precipitates. Deposits of this type formed in the brittle-ductile crustal transition zone at 1.5 to 3.0 kbars. In contrast, gold mineralisation at Jojo and especially the Indarama gold deposits probably formed at lower temperatures (<<300 °C) and from dominantly aqueous, early moderate- to late high-salinity fluids.

=== Manufacturing ===
Zimbabwe Iron and Steel Company (ZISCO) and Lancashire Steel are the major players in the city. ZISCO, with its satellite town of Redcliff, is the centre of Zimbabwe's steel industry. Lancashire Steel (Pvt. Ltd.) is involved in the manufacture of steel rods and wire.

=== Dairy industry ===
Dendairy is the second largest dairy producer in Zimbabwe which is now a major player in the manufacturing business in Kwekwe. Dendairy is the only dairy company in Zimbabwe that is able to produce UHT milk that has a shelf life of up to a year. Dendairy produces UHT milk, maas (fermented) milk, yoghurt, ice cream and fruit juices. Dendairy have the only Tetra Pak Plant in Zimbabwe which packs boxed UHT long life milk that has a shelf life of one year.

=== Chemicals ===
Sable Chemicals is located just outside the city. It is the only producer of fertiliser in the whole country. Sable Chemicals produces hydrogen for ammonium nitrate required for manufacturing fertiliser using the world's largest electrolysis plant. This requires half the electricity available from the Kariba hydroelectric power station.

=== Services ===
The main retailers and banks in the country have branches in Kwekwe. OK and TM Supermarkets have outlets along the main street in the town. Kingdom Bank, Trust Bank, Barclays Bank, Standard Chartered Bank, CBZ Bank, Stanbic Bank, Allied Bank and Ecobank all maintain branches in city.

== Travel and tourism ==
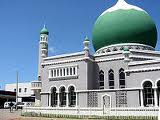
Kwekwe Mosque

Despite the poor economy, some small tourist operators maintain hunting and photographic safari licences on farms and concessions near town, where an abundance of wildlife can be seen, including rhino, elephant, leopard, lion and most big antelope (such as kudu, eland, sable, and tsessebe). The Kwekwe Sports Club hosts games by Zimbabwe's Midlands provincial cricket side, and hosted a One Day International against Kenya in 2002, along with a number of matches between Zimbabwe A and touring teams. Sebakwe dam is one of the main tourist attractions whereby tourists can waterski, hunt, view game and camp. Sable Park is a recreational privately owned game reserve.

The National Mining Museum, dedicated to the mining industry in the country, is one of the main tourist attractions in the city, near the entrance of Gold and Phoenix mine. The museum is housed at Paper House, a wood framed, prefrabricated building constructed and shipped from the United Kingdom to Zimbabwe in 1894. Despite its unorthodox construction, the building remains in excellent condition and is a city landmark. Other notable attractions in the city include, Sebakwe Recreational Park, Sebakwe Dam, Echo Park and Lower Zivangwe Dam (commonly known by residents as Dutchman's Pool)

== Public services ==
- Kwekwe General Hospital in Newtown, five kilometres east of the city centre, close to the Kwekwe Railway Station, is the main medical facility in the town. Although it belongs to the government, the City Council oversees it. It is a major centre for TB treatment in the district.
- Kwekwe City Council
- Zimpost, the national postal carrier's offices are located along main (called RGM) Way opposite city hall. POSB, the government bank is found on the edge of the city, behind the prominent mosque at the north entrance of the town.
- The city is also served by Kwekwe East Airport (IATA: n/a, ICAO: FVKK).

== Politics ==
The member of parliament (MP) for Kwekwe Central constituency was Emmerson Mnangagwa until his defeat in the elections of 2000. Since then, Blessing Chebundo of the opposition Movement for Democratic Change (MDC) has represented the district in the Parliament of Zimbabwe. Kwekwe politics is mainly dominated by MDC.

As with other Zimbabwean towns run by opposition parties, Kwekwe saw a number of politically motivated incidents during the 2000s and early 2010s, in which people were killed and arrested.

== Image gallery ==
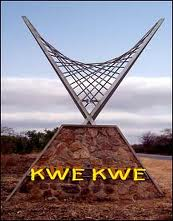
Kwekwe

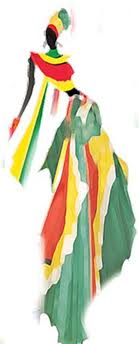
Out of Kwekwe art and design

== See also ==
- List of reduplicated place names

== Sources ==
- Clements, F. (1963) THIS IS OUR LAND, Stories and Legends of the two Rhodesias, Salisbury, Southern Rhodesia.
