= Sebungwe Regional Concept Plan =

The Sebungwe Regional Concept Plan was a land-use plan the Department of Physical Planning created in the early 1980s for the Sebungwe Region in north-western Zimbabwe. The plan helped guide development, conservation, and infrastructure planning south of Lake Kariba, including Binga, Gokwe North and Kariba Districts.

Following the construction of the Kariba Dam, the Sebungwe region in north-western Zimbabwe experienced increased settlement pressure, having historically been sparsely populated. The expansion of communal areas in the former Tribal Trust Lands contributed to this trend. To address resulting issues like land degradation, human–wildlife conflict, and uneven service provision, the Sebungwe area was identified as a priority zone for coordinated regional planning and was associated with early wildlife-based development planning, including groundwork for the CAMPFIRE programme

== Objectives ==
The Sebungwe Regional Concept Plan aimed to establish a coherent regional land-use framework, balancing agricultural expansion with wildlife conservation, guiding settlement patterns and infrastructure development, promoting sustainable use of natural resources in a semi-arid environment, and reducing land-use conflicts between communal areas, protected areas, and forestry zones in the Sebungwe Region.

== Approach and implementation ==
The Concept Plan took a regional approach, viewing Sebungwe as one landscape connected by rivers and ecology. It zoned land for conservation, agriculture, forestry, and settlement, aiming to balance nature protection with rural development. The plan defined the Sebungwe Region as the area south of Lake Kariba within the Zambezi Valley, incorporating communal lands used for subsistence agriculture and livestock grazing, protected areas including Matusadona National Park and Chizarira National Park, safari areas such as Chirisa Safari Area and Chete Safari Area, and forested uplands including the Mapfungautsi Plateau and Mapfungautsi State Forest.

However, the plan's implementation seems to have focused on areas closer to protected zones, with limited reach into areas like the Ngondoma and Sanyati river basins in Gokwe South, which may have had different development priorities and challenges balancing wildlife conservation with the predominantly rural local needs. Although formally adopted, implementation of the Sebungwe Regional Concept Plan was limited due to institutional constraints, funding shortages, and subsequent administrative reorganisation, such that planned activities were not carried through into practice at scale. By the late 20th century, the Sebungwe Region had been subdivided into smaller administrative districts, notably Gokwe North District and Gokwe South District, a process which further diluted regional planning coordination and reduced the influence of the original concept plan in shaping local development trajectories, resulting in little or no implementation.

== Current status and legacy ==
The plan is widely regarded as a historically important but largely unimplemented regional planning framework. Although completed in the early 1980s by Zimbabwe's Department of Physical Planning, the plan failed to progress into sustained implementation due to limited institutional capacity, funding constraints. Nonetheless the Sebungwe landscape has gained renewed importance in the 21st century through conservation-led initiatives. It's a critical ecological connectivity zone in the KAZA TFCA, linking Hwange–Okavango to the Zambezi Valley. The proposed "Sebungwe Conservation and Development Hub" aims to revitalise landscape-scale planning, coordinating conservation, development, and resource management through a multi-stakeholder approach. It'll support landscape planning, integrate livelihoods and biodiversity, and address gaps from the original Sebungwe Regional Concept Plan's implementation.

Sector-specific interventions, like wildlife restoration and community-based land management, reflect the 1980s Sebungwe Regional Concept Plan's vision but operate independently. The Plan remains an example of early post-independence regional planning in Zimbabwe, with ambitions never fully realised. Contemporary initiatives highlight the Plan's relevance and challenges of coordinated planning in north-western Zimbabwe.

== See also ==
- The Gumbero-Njelele chieftainship conflict location
