= Sebungwe Region =

Region of north-western Zimbabwe

- Region
- Interactive map of Sebungwe Region
- Coordinates: 17.8646°S 27.1752°E
- Country: Zimbabwe

Area
  - Total: 17,000 km^{2} (6,600 sq mi)
- Time zone: UTC+2 (CAT)

The Sebungwe Region is an extensive geographical and historical area in north-western Zimbabwe, covering roughly 17,000 square kilometres (6,600 sq mi). It lies to the south of Lake Kariba and represents the easternmost section of the Kavango–Zambezi Transfrontier Conservation Area (KAZA TFCA), a major cross-border conservation landscape shared by five southern African countries.

Administratively, the region stretches across four districts—Binga, Gokwe North, Nyaminyami, and Kariba. Sebungwe is notable for its varied land use patterns, which include protected national parks, safari and wildlife management areas, forestry zones, and communal lands. This mix of environments supports significant wildlife movement, making the region an important ecological corridor within the broader KAZA conservation network.

== History ==
The origins of Sebungwe (Gokwe Region)'s name and its administrative evolution are described differently, but complementarily rather than contradictorily, in various sources. In terms of Historiography and Toponymy, these accounts reflect the gradual consolidation of Mapfungautsi into the wider Sebungwe Region during the early 20th century, as documented in successive colonial maps and administrative records.

The Sebungwe Region was a composite territory comprising distinct areas, not a homogeneous unit:

- Sebungu – the north-western component, associated with early district administration and cartography
- Mapfungautsi (Mafungabusi) – the eastern and southern component, centred on a Tsetse-fly Control Camp that formed the nucleus of what would become Gokwe, situated on a forested plateau, part of which later became Mapfungautsi State Forest

These areas retained their distinct geographical and historical identities, contributing to ambiguity in defining the scope of the Sebungwe Region.

=== The formation of Sebungwe ===
Sources differ slightly on the original names of the core areas that formed the Sebungwe Region, but it is generally agreed that Sebungu and Mapfungautsi merged to create it, with some variation in accounts regarding the earlier designation of the territory now known as Gokwe

According to Ngwenya Menelisi, the area was originally designated as Sebungu, established on 15 March 1898. On 2 August 1901, Sebungu and Mapfungautsi areas were amalgamated to form Sebungu-Mapfungautsi (not to be confused with Mapfungautsi State Forest, which was within the greater Mapfungautsi Plateau). This combined area was subsequently abbreviated to Sebungwe on 21 February 1907. A significant portion of Sebungwe was then redesignated as Gokwe on 18 January 1957.

Early colonial map of Gwelo Regions, Southern Rhodesia, showing Sebungwe (top left) prior to modern administrative boundaries.

On the 1909 Congress and colonial maps of Southern Rhodesia, Sebungwe and Mapfungautsi appear as distinct but related landscape names. These names may have been applied before detailed topographic surveying standardized modern landform classifications. Sebungwe is shown both as a broad territorial area and as a specific point marked Sebungwe BSAP Station (British South African Police Station), within a wider region already recognized as Sebungwe. To the east and south-east, Mapfungautsi is likewise presented as a larger landscape area and a prominent feature labelled Mapfungautsi Mnt (Mountain), suggesting that early cartographers identified the locality by its most visible high ground when viewing from the lowlands. Later surveys reinterpreted Mapfungautsi as a vast plateau.

The 1909 Congress map suggests part of Mapfungautsi's northwest might have been merged with Subungu (Binga area), forming the new Sebungwe region – without incorporating the entire Mapfungautsi area until later. On this map, Sebungwe is shown between the Gwayi and Sebungwe rivers, bordering Bubi Region. It included what is now the Kavira Forest Area.

When combined, the Gwelo Districts and Urungwe Districts maps show Mapfungautsi, not Sebungwe, bordering Lomagundi Region. This suggests the Sebungwe Region was enlarged later, or the 1901 amalgamation of Sebungu-Mapfungautsi was renamed Sebungwe later than 1909.

Although these sources present different origins and time frames of the name Sebungwe, they complement each other, painting a broader picture of the region's complex history. The 1927 Southern Rhodesia map shows Sebungwe as both a region and a reserve (TTL), with Gokwe center located within Sebungwe. This indicates the extended Sebungwe Region had encompassed Mapfungautsi by then. This map supports the 1901 map by Molyneux A.J.C, suggesting Sebungu-Mapfungautsi was either implemented later or put on hold. The 1901 map clearly shows Sebungu in today's Binga District and Mapfungautsi in today's Gokwe Region.

In later days, Sebungwe Region covered a vast area including present-day Binga and parts of Midlands Province, stretching from Kariba in the north to the Ngondoma River and Sanyati River in the south, and according to then Native Commissioner, Herbert Nassau Hemans (1871–1935) the Sanyati River was also the boundary between Sebungwe Region and Lomagundi Region (Makonde Region).

At the formation of Tribal Trust Lands (TTLs), Sebungwe was designated as one of the TTLs within the region, situated between Gokwe TTL and Gandavaroyi TTL, with Omay TTL to the northwest and Rengwe TTL to the northeast. The Sebungwe TTL's southern end was bordered by the Sanyati and Ngondoma rivers, adjacent to Zhombe TTL.

== Administrative issues ==
Following Zimbabwe's independence, the Tribal Trust Lands were reorganized into Communal Lands. During this process, some TTLs were merged into single Communal Lands, while others retained their identity under new names. Sebungwe TTL was redesignated as Nembudziya Communal Land, encompassing areas such as Mashame, Tshoda, Kuwirira, and Goredema's Mudzongwe area - the original home of the Njelele community in Chief Gumbero's territory , among others formerly part of Sebungwe TTL.

The Rural District Councils Act of 1988, implemented in July 1993, amalgamated local authorities responsible for commercial and communal farming areas within each district into Rural District Councils. The Act also led to changes in district boundaries, resulting in some districts being divided into two, as was the case when Gokwe was split into North and South districts.

== Current status ==
According to available information, Sebungwe is identified as a small river located at coordinates -17.86462°, 27.17522°, situating it in the Binga area of Matabeleland North. Sebungwe is also a place, (not a region), marked as a diamond occurrence in the Middle Zambezi Basin, Binga District, which is actually Sebungwe District by any other name. Sebungu is also marked as a coal occurrence not far from the Sebungwe diamond site.

However, the term "Sebungwe Region" is also used to describe a broader region, encompassing areas from Binga to Kariba, including parts of Gokwe North District, as referenced by wildlife conservation organisations such as the Cheetah Conservation Initiative and the Sebungwe Regional Concept Plan.

== See also ==
- Gokwe region
- Gokwe North
- Land reform in Zimbabwe
