= Gokwe region =

Region in Zimbabwe

The Gokwe Region consists of the land in the area around Gokwe centre that was formerly under the control of the Shangwe people, a Shona-speaking group, which lay in the northern part of the Midlands province of northwestern Zimbabwe, and is now broken up into Gokwe South District and Gokwe North District. A number of other groups live in the area, including the Tonga, and Ndebele.

Nkayi North District lies to the south. A researcher noted in 1998 "that the Nkayi-Gokwe border had hardened even before independence when Shona-speaking auxiliary forces had been recruited in Gokwe and used against Nkayi in explicitly tribal attacks".

== History ==
The Gokwe Region developed from the former Sebungwe Region, an extensive administrative area in north-western Zimbabwe during the colonial period. Sebungwe stretched from the Zambezi River in the north to the Ngondoma River in the south, where it bordered the Kwekwe District. Its western limits adjoined Wankie and Bubi districts, while Nkayi lay to the south-east. To the east, the Sanyati River formed a natural boundary separating Sebungwe from Lomagundi and the Sanyati areas.

Sebungwe itself originated from the earlier Sebungwe–Mapfungautsi (Mafungabusi) Region, an amalgamation of Sebungu and Mapfungautsi.

The emergence of Gokwe did not result from the internal evolution of Sebungwe as a whole, but from wider colonial administrative restructuring. During the redrawing of provincial boundaries between Mashonaland, (now Mashonaland West), Matabeleland, (now Matabeleland North Province, and the Midlands in the Zambezi valley zone, Sebungwe, a trans-provincial region, was divided along new provincial lines. The Matabeleland portion was incorporated into Binga District, the Mashonaland section into Kariba District, and the central portion within the Midlands became Gokwe District, from which the modern Gokwe Region derives. These boundary changes had the effect of dissolving Sebungwe as a unified region and establishing Gokwe as its principal successor within the Midlands portion of the former region.

== Name: Gokwe ==
The Mapfungautsi–Sebungwe–Gokwe belt lies within the Miombo woodland zone, characterised by flowering tree species such as Brachystegia, Julbernardia, and Isoberlinia. This woodland ecology has historically supported wild honey production, an activity widely practised in the region. In many pre-colonial southern African contexts, place-naming practices commonly reflected livelihood, environment, and visible ecological features rather than abstract symbolism.

Even where the origins of names like Gokwe are not conclusively asserted in established scholarship, oral tradition remains a legitimate historical source. Rather than offering final answers, such accounts serve as heuristic clues helping scholars identify patterns, locations, and contexts. For historicism which "forgets" and ignores its own historicity, becomes a problem forever unsolved.

Within this framework, the name Sebungu is often interpreted in oral tradition as being associated with landscape abundance. Local explanations link the element bungu with accumulation or concentration, sometimes described in relation to fertility-associated substances such as pollen or chaff, although this interpretation is not formally attested in linguistic literature.

By contrast, colonial-era writers and later compilers of place-name traditions have suggested that the name Gokwe may derive from a term in the Tonga (Chitonga) language meaning a “bee hive”. A beehive represents a concentrated site of productivity, in which honey is produced from pollen gathered across the surrounding woodland landscape.

Rather than indicating direct linguistic borrowing, the apparent overlap between the interpretations of Sebungu and Gokwe can be understood as reflecting a shared conceptual field centred on abundance and productivity: abundance → fertility → production → honey → pollen. This pattern is consistent with naming practices in cultural contact zones where different language communities describe the same environment using distinct but thematically related terms.

Although a direct linguistic derivation has not been demonstrated, the resemblance between _Gokwe_ and _Ugokwe_, together with their associated meanings relating to abundance and resource richness, may reflect shared semantic patterns within Bantu naming traditions rather than a single traceable origin. While no direct etymological link between _Gokwe_ and _Ugokwe_ has been established in published sources, the similarity in form and the thematic overlap in meaning are consistent with broader patterns in Toponymy and Bantu linguistics, in which place names often reflect shared cultural concepts such as fertility, abundance, and resource richness.

The Sebungwe region historically functioned as such a contact zone, involving Tonga-speaking communities of the Zambezi valley, Shangwe-Shona groups associated with the Mapfungautsi plateau, and later Ndebele political influence. In these contexts, place names often echoed shared themes rather than exact lexical meanings, and their recorded forms could shift across languages. Several accounts note that colonial administrators frequently standardised spellings based on what they heard, fixing names in written form without recording their original semantic intent.

While these interpretations do not constitute definitive etymological proof, they offer a plausible explanatory framework in which Sebungu emphasised abundance in the landscape, while Gokwe highlighted a mechanism of abundance—beekeeping—within the same ecological system. Taken together, multiple traditions associate both names with fertility, productivity, and honey production, reflecting the long-standing economic and environmental significance of Miombo woodland resources in the region.

== Legacy ==
The Gokwe Region later gave rise to Gokwe North and Gokwe South districts; while the name Gokwe may refer to either, it is most commonly associated with Gokwe South, which contains Gokwe town, the region’s principal urban centre.

== See also ==
Sebungwe Region Mapfungautsi
