= The Gumbero-Njelele chieftainship conflict =

Traditional leadership dispute in Gokwe South District, Zimbabwe

Gumbero–Njelele chieftainship conflict
- Date: c. 1940s – present
- Location: Gokwe South District, Zimbabwe
- Caused by: Colonial administrative restructuring; chieftaincy downgrading
- Status: Ongoing
- Result: Unresolved

Parties
Gumbero (Chisina) lineage	Njelele chieftaincy

The Gumbero–Njelele chieftainship conflict is a long-standing dispute over traditional authority, territorial jurisdiction, and chieftaincy recognition in Gokwe South District, Zimbabwe. The conflict involves the Gumbero (also known as Chisina) lineage and the Njelele chieftaincy, and originated during mid-20th-century colonial administrative restructuring. Academic studies identify the dispute as a protracted social conflict rooted in colonial governance practices that continue to shape post-independence traditional leadership arrangements.

== Geographic setting ==
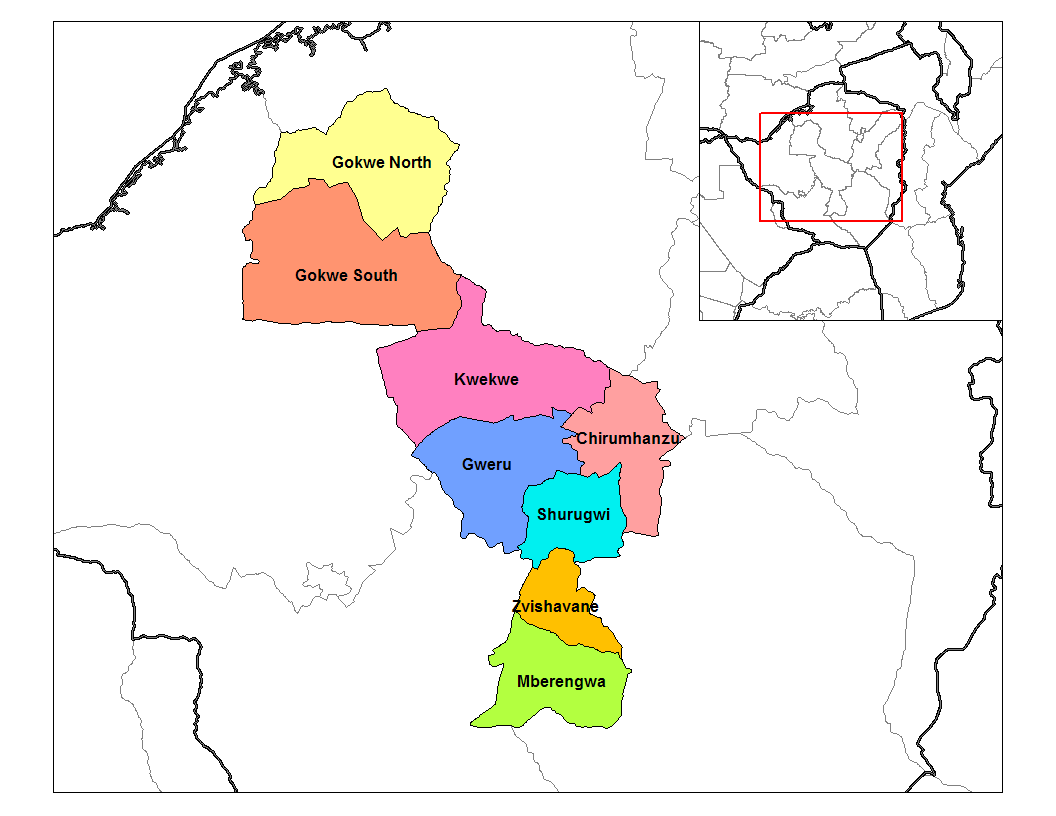
Location of Gokwe South District in Zimbabwe

The conflict is situated in the Sebungwe Region of northwestern Zimbabwe, within present-day Gokwe South District. The area is predominantly rural and administered through a combination of state institutions and customary leadership systems. Control over territory is closely linked to land allocation, customary courts, and ritual authority, making chieftaincy recognition a central issue.

Location of Gokwe South District in Zimbabwe

== Background ==
Oral traditions recorded in historical accounts state that Gumbero initially exercised chieftaincy authority, with Njelele serving as a subordinate leader. Over time, both figures came to preside over separate territories. Colonial intervention altered this arrangement, resulting in the recognition of Njelele as chief and the downgrading of Gumbero to headman status. These changes are widely regarded as the foundation of the modern dispute.

=== Pre-colonial history ===
Before colonial rule, the Gumbero and Njelele communities functioned as autonomous traditional polities within the wider Sebungwe region. Authority over land and people was governed by customary law based on lineage, spiritual legitimacy, and hereditary succession.

=== Gumbero (Chisina) lineage ===
Gumbero, also known as Chisina, has been recognised as a headmanship under Chief Njelele since 1957. The area lies east of Mutange Dam, with Chisina Township serving as its administrative centre.

According to oral history documented by Zimbabwe Field Guide, the Gumbero people trace their origins to the Vahera under Nyashanu in Buhera and migrated into the Sebungwe region during the 18th century. Their earliest ancestors are believed to have been buried near Chidoma Hill, which remains a site of ritual significance.

Karimanzira notes that the Gumbero chieftaincy once controlled a large territory extending from the Ngondoma River to Chemumvuri before colonial intervention reduced its authority. Succession within the lineage is recorded through several leaders, culminating in Tendaupenyu Gumbero, who became the first to use the title Chief Chisina, reflecting the diminished status of the chieftaincy.

=== Njelele chieftaincy ===
The Njelele chieftaincy occupies territory in eastern Gokwe South District, including parts of the Mapfungautsi Plateau. Its boundaries are commonly described as extending from the Ngondoma River toward the Munyati River, with the northern limits approaching Gokwe town.

The Njelele people identify as a VaRozvi subgroup with the Mpofu totem. Oral traditions recorded by Karimanzira suggest that they migrated from Guruuswa alongside the Chireya and Nemangwe lineages and initially settled near the Mdzongwe River, where ancestral sites remain visible at Kadzongwana.

== Gumbero–Njelele dispute ==
Multiple oral accounts describe early tensions between the two communities. One account holds that Njelele’s people encountered Gumbero settled near southern Chidoma and sought land extending northwards to the Nyarupakwe River. This led to violent confrontation before elders negotiated a boundary at a wetland known as Hovano, meaning “place of sharing”.

A second account, recorded in later narratives, maintains that Njelele was originally granted land by Gumbero and appointed as a subordinate leader, only being elevated to chief after colonial authorities accused Gumbero of insubordination. Karimanzira observes that the prior existence of Hovano as a recognised boundary suggests the earlier account may reflect pre-colonial arrangements.

=== Colonial administrative restructuring ===
Although the Hovano agreement reduced direct confrontation, it did not resolve disputes over chieftaincy recognition. Karimanzira argues that colonial administrators in Southern Rhodesia reorganised traditional leadership structures during the 1940s to facilitate indirect rule, a process that often intensified existing rivalries rather than resolving them.

Within this context, the Gumbero chieftaincy was downgraded to a headmanship and placed under the authority of Chief Njelele, reportedly due to resistance to colonial labour demands. Zimbabwe Field Guide records that similar sanctions were applied to other chiefs in the region, including Chief Mupare, whose refusal to cooperate with colonial administrators resulted in the non-recognition of his chieftaincy and the displacement of his people.

Scholars contend that these interventions disrupted established succession systems and significantly altered traditional power relations, producing grievances that have persisted into the post-colonial period.

== Post-colonial developments ==
Following Zimbabwe’s independence in 1980, expectations arose that colonial distortions of traditional leadership would be addressed. However, administrative authority remained vested in the Njelele chieftaincy, and disputes continued over land administration, tribute obligations, and customary judicial authority.

=== Petitions and appeals ===
The Gumbero lineage has submitted multiple petitions seeking reinstatement of its chieftaincy, including formal appeals to provincial and national authorities in 2004 and 2009. While officials have acknowledged the historical basis of these claims, no formal resolution had been implemented as of the early 2020s.

== Nature of the conflict ==
Academic literature characterises the Gumbero–Njelele dispute as a protracted social conflict, marked by enduring historical grievances, contested legitimacy, and the long-term consequences of colonial administrative policy. The conflict has largely been expressed through legal, administrative, and symbolic contestation rather than sustained armed violence.

== Current status ==
As of recent scholarly assessments, the Gumbero–Njelele chieftainship conflict remains unresolved. The Gumbero lineage continues to seek recognition as a restored chieftaincy, while the Njelele chieftaincy retains administrative authority over the disputed territories. Researchers and community stakeholders have advocated for resolution through traditional reconciliation mechanisms or state-led recognition processes.

== See also ==
- Gokwe South District
- Chisina Township
