= Mapfungautsi =

- Historical region
- Country: Zimbabwe
- Provinces (modern): Mashonaland West, Midlands
- Historical period: Pre-colonial to early colonial era
- Named for: Local toponymy reflecting its elevated terrain

Government
  - Type: Traditional authorities (historical)
- Time zone: UTC+2 (CAT)
- Boundaries are reconstructed from historical descriptions and cartographic sources and are approximate.

Mapfungautsi—often misspelled as "Mafungabusi" during the colonial period—was a historical administrative district located in north-western Southern Rhodesia, now Zimbabwe. Before the early 20th century, it was a distinct landscape defined by a forested plateau; its southwestern portion now comprises the Mapfungautsi State Forest. Together with the neighboring Sibungu District, it formed the basis of the greater Sebungwe Region, from which the modern Gokwe Region later emerged.

The Mapfungautsi Plateau, which lends its name to the district and Mapfungautsi State Forest, still holds onto the name. Meanwhile, the Mapfungautsi Region has evolved into Gokwe region

== Etymology and toponymy ==
The name Mapfungautsi derives from local Shona usage and is associated with the wooded plateau and forested highlands of the area. The name is thought to have been given by people living in the lower-lying eastern areas, who regarded Mapfungautsi as a mountain because of its steep cliffs and the hills clustered around its base. During the dry season, as the year draws to a close, people in the valleys and lowlands observe the entire mountain appearing to emit smoke during the day, while in the evening it seems to glow with a large fire, despite nothing actually burning. In this sense, Mapfungautsi—utsi meaning “smoke”—literally means “that which gives off smoke,” or “the smoking entity,” the Smoke-emitting-Mountain in this case.

Although Mapfungautsi is technically a plateau, its high elevation and steep edges make it look like a mountain to people coming from the surrounding lowlands. In traditional local place-naming, especially before land surveys, what people saw was more important than scientific accuracy. Features that looked like mountains were often named as mountains. Early maps, including the Orographical Map of Southern Rhodesia, therefore labelled the plateau as a mountain, likely based on visual observation rather than precise measurement tools available at the time.

== Geography ==
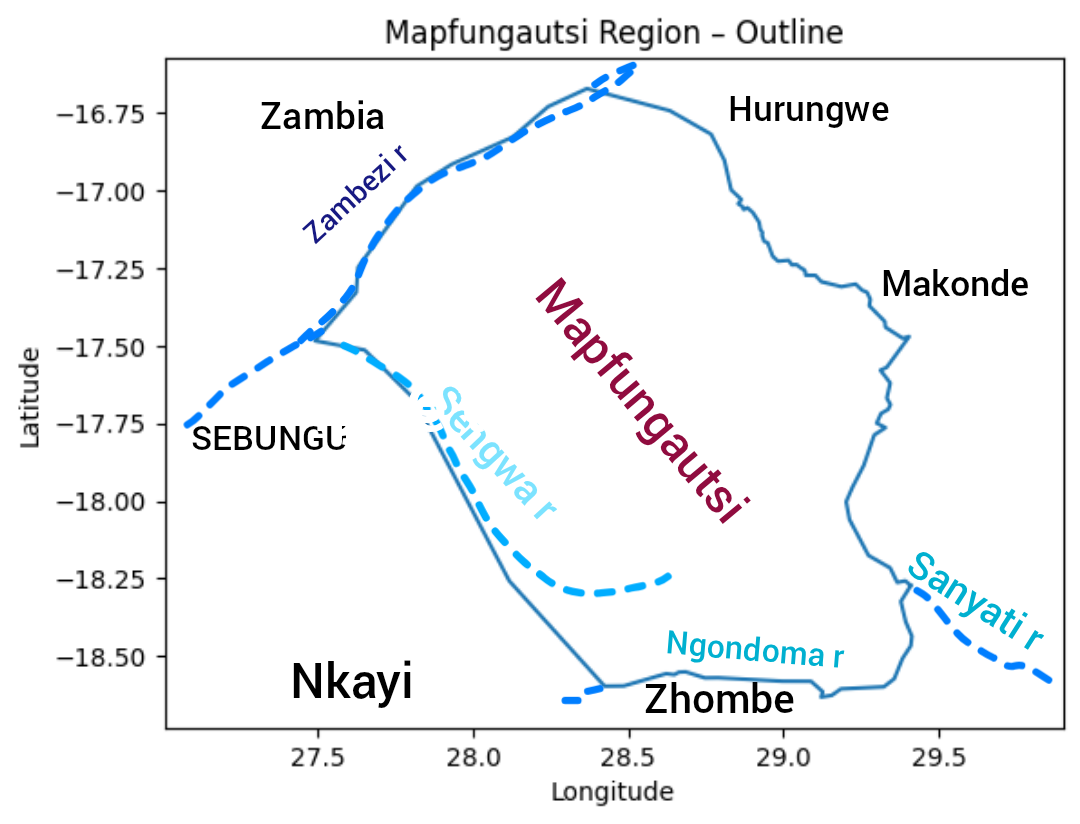
Approximate outline of the Mapfungautsi region, based on historical sources

The Mapfungautsi Region was an upland area situated in north-western Zimbabwe, approximately between latitude 16.75° S to 18.5° S and longitude 27.5° E to 29.5° E. The region lay on a rugged plateau with prominent escarpments and surrounding hills, forming a natural watershed between the middle Zambezi Valley to the north and lower inland plains to the east and south.

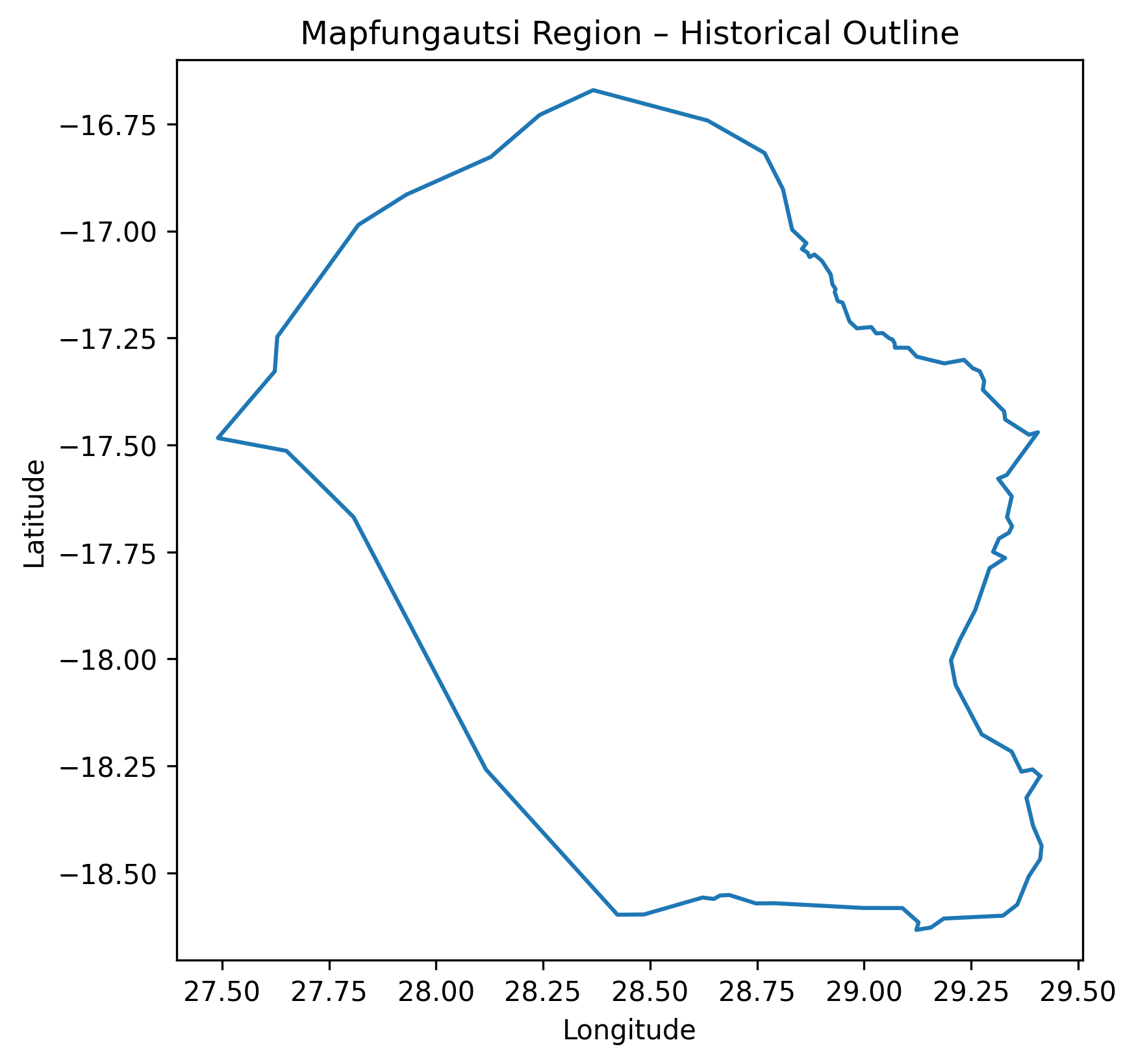
Outline map showing the approximate extent of the historic Mapfungautsi region

The region's terrain was dominated by dense woodland, distinguishing it from the neighbouring low-lying Sebungu area to the west. The Sengwa River flowed through the region, draining northwards toward the Zambezi River. The Sanyati river, which received the Ngondoma River as a tributary, also drained the region and formed a natural border with Makonde district. Other rivers, such as the Svisvi and Sesame, flowed northwards through the region.

Mapfungautsi Region bordered the districts of Hurungwe, Makonde, Zhombe, Nkayi, Lupane, and Sebungu (Binga), and was characterised by its elevated terrain and woodland ecosystem.

Within its borders lay a vast woodland dominated by teak and mahogany trees, among other indigenous species, which contributed to the region's distinction from surrounding low-lying areas. This forest resource would later lead to the demarcation of a significant portion of Mapfungautsi as a protected state forest in 1953, recognised as one of the largest indigenous forests in Zimbabwe, playing a crucial role in the country's conservation efforts.

== Historical background ==
Mapfungautsi was formally gazetted as a district in the late 19th century, shortly after colonial administration was established in north-western Southern Rhodesia. At that time, it existed as a separate administrative entity alongside Sebungu and Wankie to the west and Lomagundi to the east, each recognised as distinct districts within a loosely defined frontier zone. In 1901, Mapfungautsi was merged with Sebungu to form Sebungwe–Mafungabusi, a single administrative unit. By 1907, the combined name was shortened to Sebungwe, marking a shift toward a unified regional identity and gradually phasing out the name Mapfungautsi from official use.

== Relationship to Sebungu, Sebungwe, and Gokwe ==
Mapfungautsi played a central role in forming the Sebungwe Region but wasn't synonymous with it. Before amalgamation, Sebungu and Mapfungautsi were adjacent yet distinct areas, with Sinasenkwe river (a name of the local chieftaincy, "Sinasenkwe") ), serving as the boundary between them, although early cartographic sources sometimes obscured this distinction through confusion with the larger Sengwe River. Mapfungautsi was associated with the eastern and southern portions - the forested plateau and settlement zones. Post-amalgamation boundary changes saw Sebungwe's easterly areas, largely Mapfungautsi, become Gokwe in 1927. This suggests Gokwe developed primarily from Mapfungautsi territory, not directly from Sebungu, despite later name conflation.

== Forest conservation and later significance ==
=== Animals, Memory, and the Interpretation of Risk ===
Oral traditions from the Mapfungautsi North regions preserve recurring explanations of human encounters with animals perceived as mediators of danger, survival, or exposure. These explanations are not presented as technical descriptions of animal cognition, but as culturally stabilised interpretations of lived experience. Read through the lens of oral historiography, they offer insight into how communities historically made sense of risk in environments shaped by wildlife, resource extraction, and later administrative surveillance

Lions, Axes, and Forest Travel

In forested areas associated with Mapfungautsi, oral accounts describe the carrying of lightweight iron axes with crescent-shaped blades when travelling through lion-inhabited landscapes. These implements are remembered as distinct from the standard Shona gano and are frequently associated with protection from lion attacks. Informants maintain that individuals carrying such axes were less vulnerable, a claim transmitted as part of broader instruction on appropriate comportment in dangerous terrain. While not verifiable as zoological claims, such traditions are best understood as socially transmitted memories of historical experience rather than assertions about animal behaviour. In Vansina’s terms, their significance lies in persistence and function. The axe operates as a mnemonic anchor through which lessons about readiness, posture, and refusal to flee are encoded. What is remembered is not a causal mechanism—why a lion would avoid a particular object—but a behavioural model that historically reduced risk. The tradition thus preserves experiential knowledge in narrative form, stabilised across generations through material culture.

Tracking Dogs, Scent, and Exposure

In more recent historical contexts, particularly those associated with mining, border control, and policing, similar explanatory patterns emerge around tracking dogs. Oral accounts frequently attribute dogs’ effectiveness to their ability to smell gold, stolen goods, or fear itself. Individuals confronted by dogs are said to be exposed not by their actions alone, but by bodily states that betray guilt or anxiety. From a scientific perspective, dogs respond to volatile organic compounds associated with human scent and physiological change rather than to abstract emotions or inert materials. However, oral historiography does not require literal accuracy to be historically informative. These narratives correctly locate detection in the body and preserve an intuitive recognition that stress, concealment, and altered comportment increase vulnerability. As with the lion traditions, the animal is cast as perceiving what humans cannot, transforming sudden exposure into intelligible causation. The persistence of these explanations reflects their function: they render encounters with authority narratable and morally legible. In Vansina’s framework, such traditions qualify as historical sources insofar as they transmit socially meaningful interpretations of repeated experience, rather than technical accounts of detection.

Comparative Perspective: Honeyguides and Human Signalling

A useful comparative case is found in documented cooperation between human honey-hunters and the greater honeyguide (Indicator indicator) in parts of northern Mozambique. Ethnographic and ethological studies show that honey-hunters employ culturally specific vocal signals to attract honeyguides, which then lead them to beehives. These calls vary regionally in patterns analogous to human dialects, and honeyguides respond most readily to local variants. Unlike the lion or dog traditions, this interaction has a demonstrable ecological basis: repeated mutual benefit has produced a stable pattern of interspecies signalling without training or domestication. From an oral-historical perspective, the honeyguide case is instructive not as proof of animal understanding of human symbols in unrelated contexts, but as evidence that long-term human–animal interaction can generate recognisable behavioural patterns that are then culturally elaborated. Placed alongside the Sebungwe–Mapfungautsi traditions, the honeyguide example clarifies a shared interpretive logic. In each case, communities observe consistent animal responses to human presence and encode these observations into explanatory frameworks that privilege experience over mechanism. What differs is not the process of interpretation, but the ecological and historical context in which it occurs.

Synthesis: Animals as Interpreters of Risk

Read comparatively, these traditions reveal a coherent regional pattern in which animals serve as interpreters of risk. Lions mediate environmental danger; dogs mediate administrative surveillance; honeyguides mediate resource acquisition. In each case, animals are understood as sensing beyond ordinary human capacity, whether through sight, smell, or instinct. Oral tradition bridges this sensory asymmetry by translating consequence into narrative causation. In Vansina’s sense, these accounts are historically valuable not because they attest to animal cognition as described, but because they preserve how communities organised memory, conduct, and expectation in landscapes of uncertainty. These practices contributed to informal systems of risk management and forest use that predated formal conservation regimes. William M. Adams has examined whether conservation should be understood primarily as an externally imposed project or as a process that can emerge from everyday social learning and collective choice within communities.

=== Contemporary Forestry Management and Conservation ===
During the 20th century, Mapfungautsi became linked to forest management and conservation, leading to the establishment of Mapfungautsi Forest as a protected area. This cemented Mapfungautsi's association with a specific ecological landscape, rather than an administrative district, distinguishing it from Sebungu and Sebungwe. The Mapfungautsi Forest's prominence in environmental discourse kept the name alive, even as its administrative meaning faded.

● In 1953 about 101,000 hactares southwest portion of Mapfungautsi Plateau was demarcated as a State protected forest, Mapfungautsi Forest.

● Chizarira National Park, covering approximately 1,910 square kilometres in the far northern part of the Mapfungautsi region, was proclaimed as a non-hunting reserve in 1958. It was later gazetted to provide sanctuary for wildlife displaced from the Zambezi Valley during the construction of the Kariba Dam. The park was formally established as a national park in 1975 under the Parks and Wildlife Act

== Historiography ==
Historical views on Mapfungautsi vary by discipline. Administrative histories often see it as part of Sebungwe, while environmental studies highlight its identity as a forested plateau. Mapfungautsi's early amalgamation with Sebungu and Sebungwe's dominance led to Mapfungautsi's marginalisation. Recent scholarship recovers these distinctions, seeing Mapfungautsi as key to forming Sebungwe and Gokwe, showing how geography shaped administrative evolution in north-western Zimbabwe.

== Legacy ==
Today, Mapfungautsi is mainly linked to Mapfungautsi Forest and its landscape. Its past as a district and part of Sebungwe is mostly of historical interest. A suburb in Gokwe town and a secondary school south of Mutange Dam carry the name. Mapfungautsi, along with Sebungu, provides context for understanding the origins of Sebungwe Region and Gokwe's emergence. Gokwe Region comprises Gokwe North District (capital: Mutora, Nembudziya) and Gokwe South District (capital: Gokwe center, also the regional capital). The two sister districts have excellent profiles.

== See also ==
Sebungwe Region Region Sebungu
