= Sebungu =

Sebungu was a historical administrative and geographical designation in north-western Southern Rhodesia (now Zimbabwe), used primarily during the late nineteenth and early twentieth centuries. The name originally referred to a river, a coal occurrence site in the Mid-Zambezi Basin, and a distinct district or locality within a wider frontier zone that later became incorporated into the composite Sebungwe Region. Although Sebungu ceased to exist as a separate administrative unit after the early colonial period, its name remains significant in the historiography of regional formation in north-western Zimbabwe.

== Name ==
The origins of the name Sebungu are not definitively documented, but its usage reflects the layered linguistic and cultural influences characteristic of the north-western Zimbabwe–upper Zambezi frontier.

The name Sebungu is of Bantu origin and is believed to derive from a local linguistic root found in the Tonga language, in which “bungu” is recorded as meaning “chaff” or fine plant material such as pollen, reflecting an environmental descriptor. The prefix Se- functions as a common noun-class or locative formative element in many Bantu toponyms of southern Africa. In this construction, Sebungu would thus refer to a place or river associated with bungu, indicating a landscape feature characterised by light, scattered vegetal matter.

== Historical background ==
=== Early colonial administration ===
In 1898, the colonial government formally defined the boundaries of the Sebungu District, together with those of the neighbouring Wankie District, forming the north-western portion of Southern Rhodesia. The adjoining Mapfungautsi District was gazetted shortly thereafter. At this stage, Sebungu functioned as a discrete administrative unit within a sparsely populated and weakly demarcated frontier zone.

=== Relationship to Mapfungautsi ===
In 1901, Sebungu and Mafungabusi were amalgamated to form a single administrative unit known as Sebungwe–Mafungabusi, reflecting the composite nature of the territory. Sebungu formed one component of the larger Sebungwe–Mapfungautsi landscape, but wasn't the same thing. Early records show Sebungu and Mapfungautsi were related but distinct - Sebungu was in the north-west, while Mapfungautsi was more the forested plateau to the east and south. This amalgamation was later renamed Sebungwe.

=== Relationship to Sebungwe ===
Late 20th-century geological maps indicate Sebungu and Sebungwe were recognised as distinct toponyms in official scientific cartography. The 1988 map "Mineral Resources of Zimbabwe" (Geological Survey Mineral Resources Series No. 22) marks Sebungu as a coal occurrence in the Middle Zambezi Basin and Sebungwe as a diamond occurrence in Binga (District). This suggests the names referred to specific areas, rather than being variant spellings. However, earlier colonial-era cartography, including the archival 1901 map by Mr. Molyneux, refers to a river in the district as "Sebungu River", whereas later map records refer to what appears to be the same river as the "Sebungwe River", implying the names were initially used somewhat interchangeably before acquiring distinct meanings in administrative and scientific contexts

== Historiography ==
The historiography of Sebungu shows the challenges of interpreting colonial admin geography. Early records had Sebungu as a distinct district, but later amalgamations and name simplifications led writers to use Sebungu, Sebungwe, and Gokwe interchangeably. Boundary changes and administrative restructuring reinforced this. More recent scholarship adopts a more nuanced interpretation, recognising Sebungwe as a colonial construct formed from pre-existing districts, including Sebungu and Mapfungautsi. From this perspective, Sebungu is understood as a foundational but limited component of a larger regional entity, rather than as the direct antecedent of modern Gokwe. This approach helps clarify long-standing ambiguities in regional naming and territorial identity in north-western Zimbabwe.

== Legacy ==
Although Sebungu no longer exists as an administrative unit, its name survives in historical documents, maps, and scholarly discussions of regional formation in north-western Zimbabwe. The study of Sebungu provides insight into the processes by which colonial governance reshaped earlier territorial concepts, producing layered and sometimes conflicting regional identities that continue to influence historical interpretation.

== See also ==
- Mapfungautsi State Forest
