= Mutange Dam =

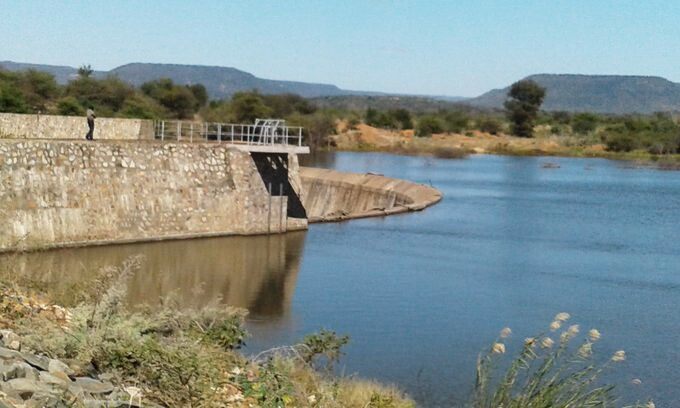
- Mutange Dam

- Location within Zimbabwe
- Country: Zimbabwe
- Location: Gokwe East, Midlands, Zimbabwe
- Coordinates: 18°12′26″S 29°14′04″E
- Purpose: Water supply/Irrigation
- Construction began: 2010
- Opening date: 2016
- Owner: Ministry of Water Resources and Development (Zimbabwe)
- Operators: Ministry of Water Resources and Development (Zimbabwe)

Dam and spillways
- Type of dam: Earth-filled embankment dam
- Impounds: Mutange River
- Dam volume: 4.95 million cubic metres

Mutange Dam, across Mutange River, is a manmade earth fill embarkment dam located in Chisina Village, 30 km east of Gokwe and 35 km northwest of Empress Mine, in the Midlands Province of Zimbabwe. Mutange Dam is 42 km by road from Gokwe and 49 km from Empress, 117 km from Kadoma and 146 km from Kwekwe via Empress (147 km via Zhombe Joel). It is owned and operated by the Ministry of Water Resources and Development.

== Background ==
Mutange Dam was constructed mainly to augment fossil borehole water supply to Gokwe Centre. It has a capacity of 4.950 million m³.

Initially, the estimated cost of construction of the dam was $8,224,504.00 (2010-2014), but because of economic constraints faced by Zimbabwe contraction which took too long to complete, it cost over $130 million due to inflation and other economic and political challenges. The dam construction was finally completed in 2016.

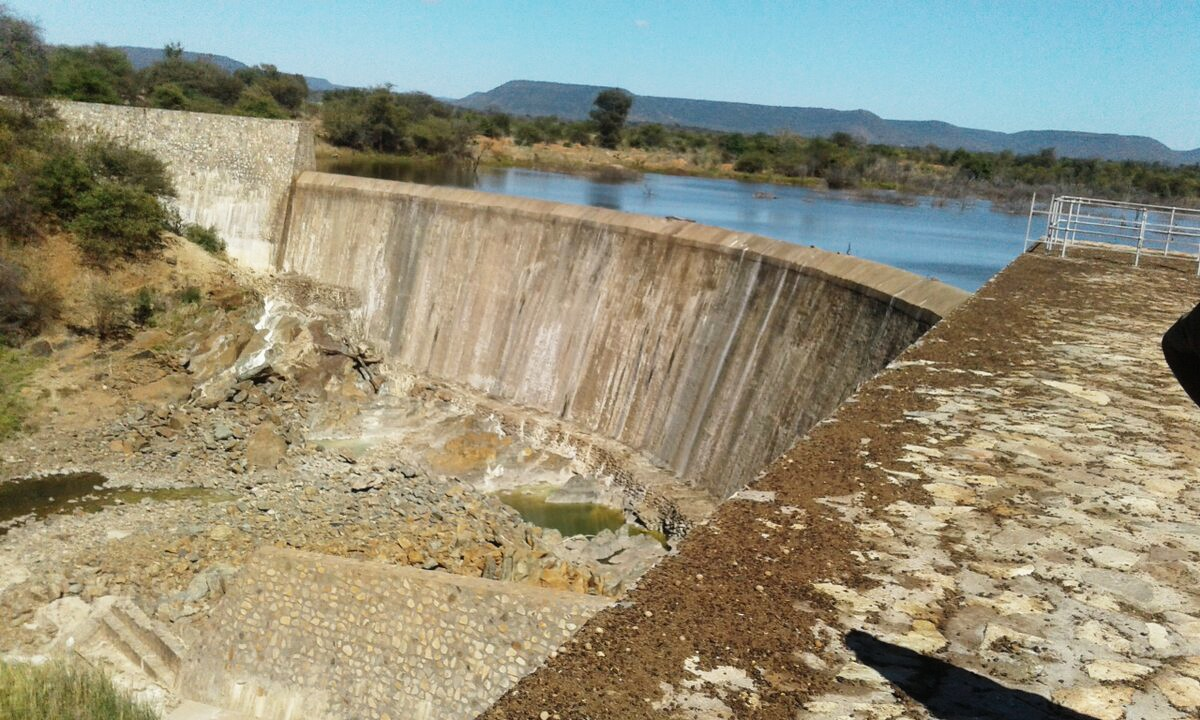
Mutange Dam in Gokwe East, Chisina Village, Zimbabwe

== Operations ==
The Mapfungautsi Plateau's Masoro Descent in Gokwe is the main drainage basin for surface runoff into the source tributaries of the Mutange River, the escapement southwest of the Mutange Dam. Mutange River has its source right up the plateau just about 1.5 km east of the Kwekwe-Gokwe Highway (18°19′23″S 29°06′25″E). Mutange River is a tributary of the Sanyati River, which drains into the Zambezi River.

== Beneficiaries ==
Mutange dam provides drinking water for both livestock and human beings. Apart from the villagers affected by the dam construction, who had to be resettled elsewhere by the government at about US$1.9 million, the rest of the community welcomed its long term benefits.

=== Mutange Dam Hydro Power Station ===
Electric pumps powered from the up-to-33 kV Mutange Hydro Power Station are set at Mutange Dam to drive raw water for over 30 km to Gokwe town, the dam's chief beneficiary. Locally, the power station drives water to Mutange Irrigation Scheme, Chisina Township and the surrounding rural villages.

=== Mutange Irrigation Scheme ===
Mutange Dam is in Zimbabwe's Agro-Ecological Region, where the average annual rainfall is 550 mm. Irrigation is therefore a critical investment in the area. Mutange Dam's immediate major beneficiary is the Mutange Irrigation Scheme. Pumping and conveyance systems at Mutange Dam connects the irrigation scheme by a pipeline running 1,500 m to the field edge of the scheme's 134 hectares of arable land.

=== Chisina Township ===
Chisina Township, named after the Chisina chieftain, 750 m east of Mtange Dam, depends on the dam for water supply. (18°12′18″S 29°14′29″E)

The township is in Mapfungautsi Parliamentary Constituency, Gokwe South District. Modern houses, including Chief Chisina's court hall, have been built in the village.

The building of the court hall might be government approval of the Chisina chieftaincy which has been in limbo for almost 70 years in conflict with the neighbouring Njelele chieftaincy. Originally Gumbero, alias Chisina, had been chief of the better part of the Mapfungautsi area, then Sebungwe East, the area bounded by Ngondoma and Munyati rivers in the east and southeast. These two major natural boundaries separate Gokwe East district from Mashonaland West Province in the east and Kwekwe District of the Midlands Province in the southeast Chief Chisina's original area of jurisdiction.

The Chisina (Gumbero) chieftaincy is traceable as far back to the early 18th century when Chihwechematanda founded it on his arrival from Buhera in the now Mashonaland East Province. The second Chief Gumbero was Mataruka, the third was Makuvidziri, the fourth was Chinengwere and the fifth was Mudyachawaona who was downgraded to a headman under Chief Njelele by the Rhodesian government in the 1940s. The 6th Chief Gumbero, the first to be nicknamed Chief Chisina, was Tendaupenyu. When the then government asked him to identify his boundaries which Chief Njelele had crossed, he claimed, "Ndave nechigaro CHISINA chinhu," meaning, "My throne is left with nothing". From thence he was mocked CHISINA, and he accepted the mock as a way of protest. The Zimbabwean government is yet to amicably solve the Chief Njelele-Chief Chisina conflict.

== See also ==
- Gokwe South District
- Gokwe
- The Gumbero-Njelele chieftainship conflict
