= Kwekwe–Gokwe Highway =

Road in Zimbabwe

The Kwekwe-Gokwe Highway or the R84-7 Highway is an all-weather bitumen macadam highway in Zimbabwe running from Kwekwe to Gokwe passing through Zhombe. As a trunk road it is officially designated as the P11 Highway.

It is 141 kilometres (88 mi) from Kwekwe to Gokwe but the highway which branches off from the A5 (Harare-Bulawayo Highway) is 137 kilometres (85 mi), a 1-hour-50-minute drive on average.

== Management ==
The Zimbabwe National Road Administration (ZINARA), a government department under the Ministry of Transport, Communication and Infrastructural Development, oversees the highway.

== Background ==
In the 1973 Automobile Association national roadmap, the Kwekwe–Gokwe road (then Que Que–Gokwe road) was a gravel one for about 99% of its present length. Only 12 kilometres (7.5 mi) of the old Gokwe road was asphalt surface from Kwekwe.

=== Reconstruction ===
The former gravel road was expanded in width and tarred from 31 January 1986 to 31 March 1991.

== Operations ==
The original plan was to construct a 7-metre-wide (23 ft) carriageway with two 1.5-metre (4.9 ft) shoulders. The road is however 6 metres (20 ft) with 2 0.5-metre (1.6 ft) shoulders constructed according to the revised plan of 1986.

=== Bridges ===
From Kwekwe to Gokwe the road passes over various rivers with standard bridges. The rivers are Kwekwe River, Rhino River, Chimwamombe River, Sesombe River, Mandombe River, Somalala River, Ngazimbi River, Zhombe River, Gwenzi River, Sehozana River, Little Sehozana River, Ufafi River and the Ngondoma River. There are no sizable rivers on the Gokwe side across the highway until after the town.

== Feeder roads ==
=== Luveve-Donjane Road ===
Luveve-Donjane Road branches westwards, passes through Tiger Reef gold mine and stretches 48.3 km, a 42 minute drive to Mushangi Shopping Center in Donjane joining the Somalala-Sidakeni Road there.

This is the shortest route from Kwekwe to Zhombe East, yet it is the slowest, as it is all gravel with a number of unprotected small bridges. However, there is one big bridge across the Sesombe River.

=== Luveve-Silobela Road ===
Luveve-Nkayi Road is a paved road officially called P8 Highway. It branches left at the same place Luveve-Donjane Road branches right.

Luveve-Nkayi Road is also known as Kwekwe-Nkayi Road, but the road actually begins from the Kwekwe-Gokwe Highway at Luveve crossroads well outside Kwekwe.

The road has one big bridge across Gweru River near Loreto Mission before reaching Crossroads District Service Center.

The road feeds Silobela and Nkayi, and from Nkayi, it continues as P9 Road to join the Victoria Falls Bulawayo Highway.

=== Somalala–Sidakeni Road ===
Somalala–Sidakeni Road (R84-103), popularly known as Zhombe East Road, is a 46 km long gravel road, connecting Kwekwe-Gokwe Highway and the Kadoma-Gokwe-via-Empress Road. It branches right from the Kwekwe-Gokwe Highway at just past the 50 km peg from Kwekwe.

Zhombe East Road feeds Donjane, Bhamala, Totororo, and Sidakeni.

There is a District Development Fund roads division deport at Mushangi Business Center in Donjane giving this road first preference on development.

It has one bridge across Zhombe River near the 25 km peg heading north.

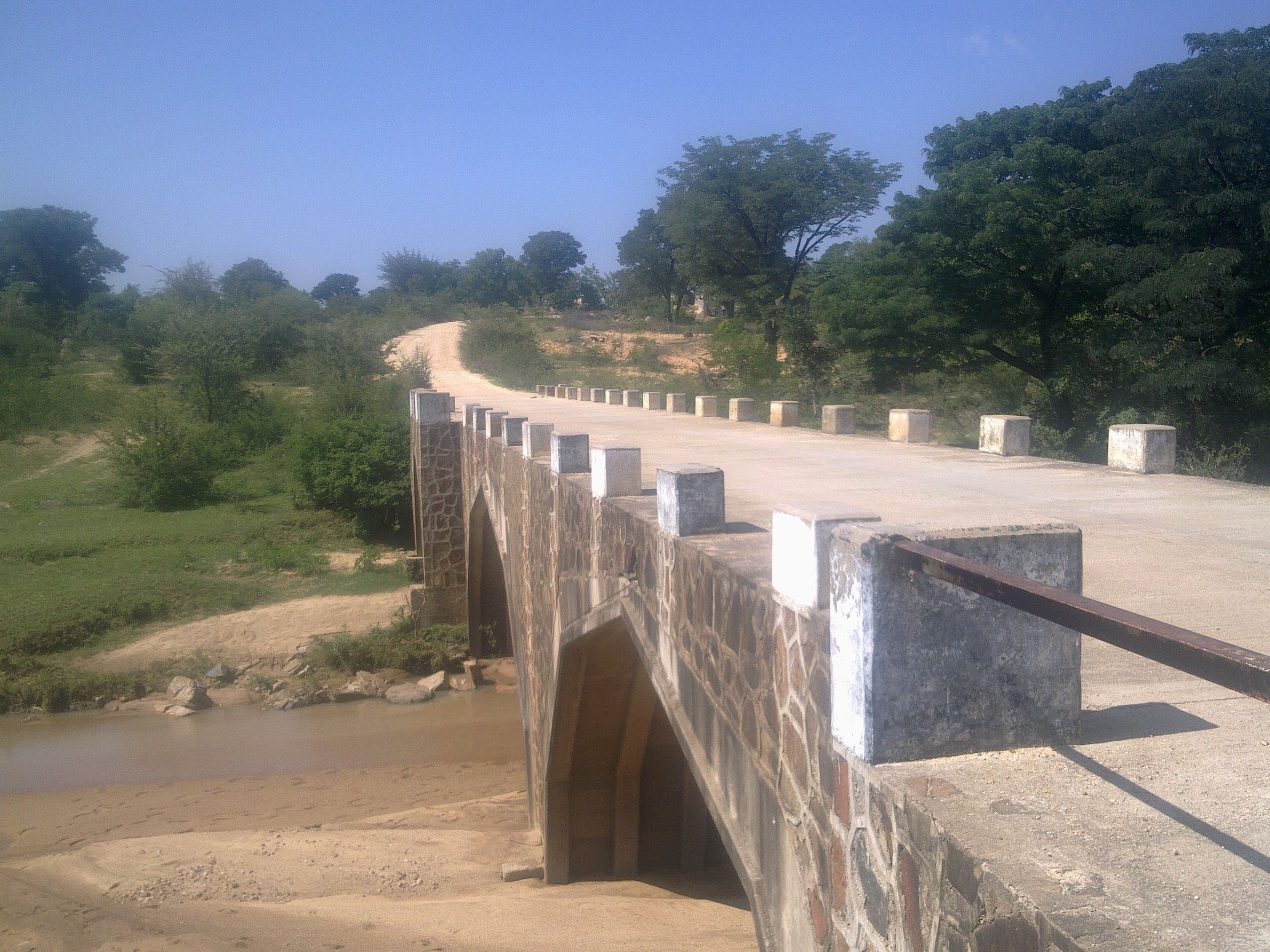
Zhombe River bridge in Zhombe east. View from the east.

=== Zhombe-Sidakeni Road ===
Zhombe-Sidakeni Road (Road 84-102) branches right from the Kwekwe-Gokwe Road at southern outskirts of Zhombe Joel District Service Center. It is sometimes called Senkwasi Road.

It is 33 km to the Kadoma-Gokwe-via-Empress Road. It feeds Gwesela West, Empress Mine, Sidakeni and Mabura.

Some sections of the road in Manzamunyama and Navata are very slippery during rainy seasons.

=== Zhombe-Silobela Road ===
Zhombe-Silobela Road branches left at Zhombe Joel and it is a 39.5 km long gravel road. It passes through Gwenzi, Mavuli, Hwida, Ntabeni then joins Luveve-Silobela Road (Kwekwe-Nkai Road) 8.7 km short of Gweru River bridge and 24 km short of Crossroads Growth Point. Loreto Mission is just less than 1 km from Gweru River Bridge. From Zhombe Joel this road has unclear routes to Exchange Irrigation Scheme but local people use various secondary roads to the scheme.

=== Fafi-St Judes Road ===
Fafi-St Judes Road branches left at Fafi shopping center, before Ngondoma River and it feeds Ntombankala and Dendera areas up to St Judes School. Some like to call this road the St Judes Crescent because of its loop-road characteristics with Champeni-St Judes Road. It makes a good round about at St Judes School and returns to Kwekwe-Gokwe Highway as Champeni-St Judes Road.

=== Muzvezve-Chemagora Road ===
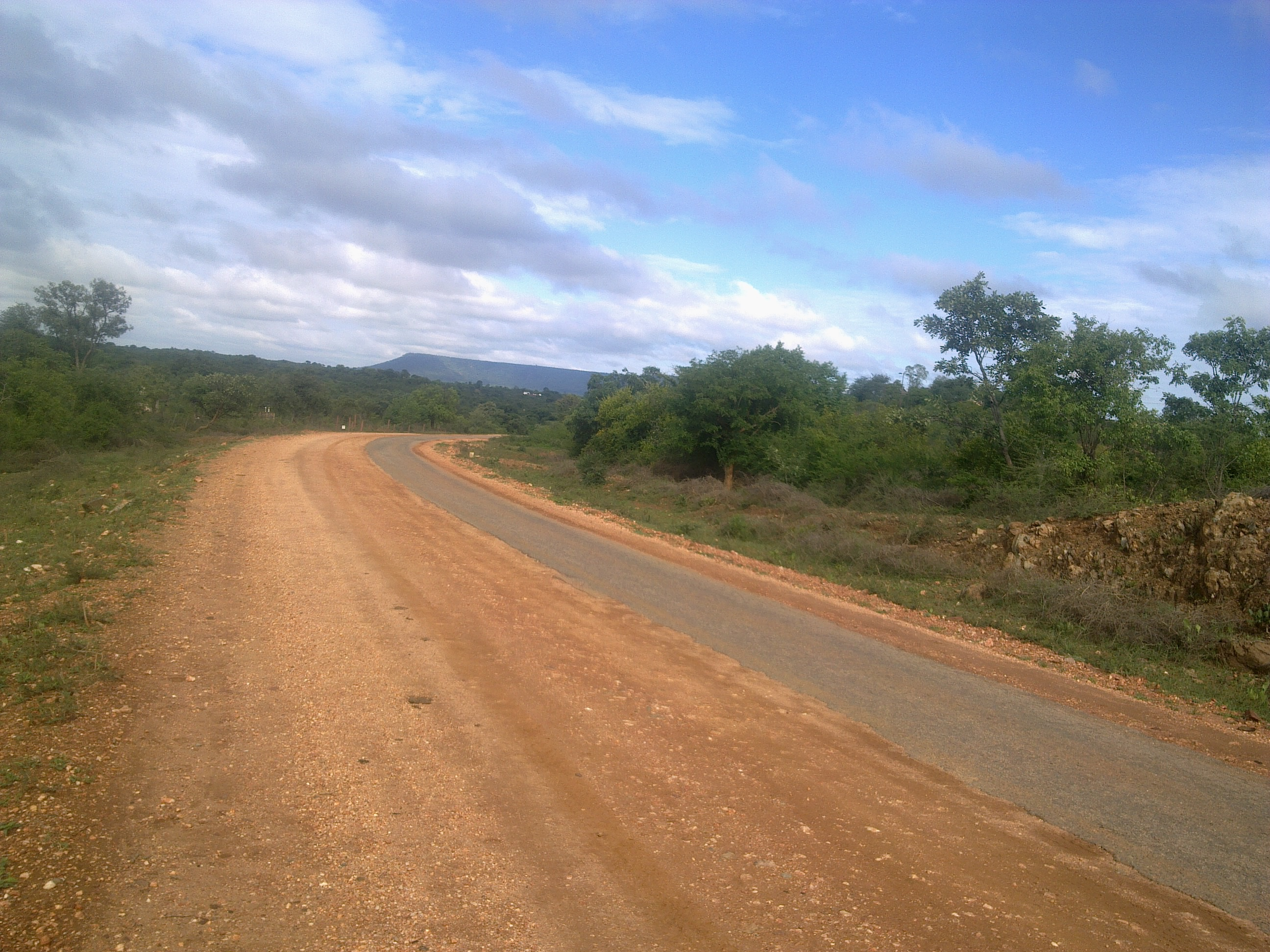
Gokwe-Emnpress Road towards Ngondoma River Bridge

Muzvezve-Chemagora Road is the local name of the road called Gokwe-Empress Road. Still some like to describe it fully in calling it the Kadoma-Gokwe-via-Empress Road, but the road neither reaches Kadoma nor Gokwe in its own capacity. Some sections among villages along the length of this road call it the Venice-Chemagora Road. Venice is a mine only 5 kilometres (3.1 mi) from its intersection with the Harare-Bulawayo Highway and Chemagora is the area where this road branches right from the Kwekwe-Gokwe Highway. Sidakeni is the main village in which the road passes through this side of the Munyati River.

It is a 9-foot tarred road, and it is the oldest tarred road in Kwekwe District (north). It branches off to the right from Kwekwe-Gokwe Road just past the 73 km and goes past Sidakeni and crosses the Munyati River to join the A5. This is the shortest route for traffic from Harare to Gokwe South District.

From the Kwekwe-Gokwe Highway the road feeds Gokwe-East, Mabura, Empress Mine and Sidakeni.

From the A5 the Gokwe-Empress Road branches westwards 22 kilometres (14 mi) south of Kadoma at A5 Empress Mine Turnoff" a place popularly called "Mtarimanja" and officially Muzvezve. 18°29′22″S 29°49′49″E Muzvezve is a river across the A5 a few kilometres north of this turn-off.

The Muzvezve-Chemagora Road goes for 74 kilometres (46 mi) as a link to the R847 Highway which is the Kwekwe-Gokwe Highway or the P11.

It passes through Venice Mine and Donain before reaching the Munyati River Bridge (Empress).

It enters Kwekwe-Gokwe Highway at Chemagora, popularly known as Empress Turnoff. 18°29′22″S 29°49′49″E

=== Sembeula Road ===
Sembeula Road branches left just before Raj Center (-18.525702, 29.806548) and stretches 50.2 km to Gweru River Bridge in Nkai area well past Sembeula Village. (-18.719823 28.814896)

=== Masoro Road ===
Masoro Road or Hovano-Chinyudze Road is a 54 km (1-hour 5 min drive) gravel loop road that joins Kwekwe-Gokwe Road and Kadoma-Gokwe-via-Empress Road. It turns right from the Kwekwe-Gokwe Road just short of the 120 km peg from Kwekwe. It is the Old Kadoma-Gokwe Road.

It is not a safe road for vehicles in poor condition. The road descends from the Mapfungautsi Plateau on a very steep pass. It feeds Masoro, Tongwe, Mazalayedwa, Gwanika and Maliyami.

It joins the Chemagora-Sidakeni at Masoro Turnoff popularly known as Chinyudze, about 5 km west of Columbina Township.

== Connectivity ==
The road connects Zhombe and Gokwe South areas to all parts of the country via its Kwekwe end. It serves Zhombe Communal Land, Chemagora purchase area, Gokwe, Nemangwe, Mutimutema and Sengwa coal mines.

== Economic viability ==
There has been improved economic and business growth in areas served by the road over the years. Both Zhombe Joel and Gokwe have experienced economic growth because of the impact of the feeder road.

== Road traffic statistics ==
Although there is no railway line to Gokwe, the road network, courtesy of the main R847 Kwekwe-Gokwe, has proved excellent. Road vehicles of all kinds and sizes are increasing just as in bigger towns and cities.

According to the project performance evaluation report of the Zimbabwe Rural Roads Project number 1, the flow of vehicles of all sizes in 1984 had an average of 131 per day. In 1991, when the tarred road was opened, the flow of such vehicles rose to 212 with a marked increase of heavy vehicles and buses. By 2011, the flow of vehicles was as high as 660 per day, with heavy goods vehicles topping the list at an average of 321 per day.

Unlike other Zimbabwean highways, the R847 has no toll gates, but the flow of vehicles on the road per day has since doubled the 2011 averages, according to statistics elsewhere on major highways. In past years, the annual average daily traffic was done by traffic recording devices or by human observers who visually had to count and record traffic on tally sheets. However, at the fall of the Zimbabwean dollar the staffed system was dropped only to come up later in the form of the toll gates system, which count vehicles by weight and generate revenue at the same time. The Kwekwe–Gokwe Highway is yet to have a toll gate.

The increase of heavy vehicles spells the growth of business in Gokwe, Zhombe and other centers in the north-eastern parts of Matabeleland North Province.

== Beneficiaries ==
=== Settlements ===
The chief beneficiary of the R847 is Gokwe, which has become the newest town in Zimbabwe credit to the Kwekwe–Gokwe Highway.

Zhombe Joel, CMB Nemangwe and Kabuyuni-Chitekete growth points have also grown to suburban standards.

Empress Mine and Columbina Township though in link roads are beneficiaries too.

=== Vehicle operators ===
Road traffic users and vehicle owners have also benefited from the R847 bitumen highway in terms of vehicle operating cost savings.

According to the project performance evaluation report of the Zimbabwe Rural Roads Project number 1, in 1984 the total savings on "vehicle operating costs" for all sizes of vehicles that used the Kwekwe-Gokwe Road was $4,084,244 for 212 vehicles: an average of about $19,265 per vehicle. As per this same cost benefit analysis in 2010, nine years after the opening of the Kwekwe-Gokwe Highway, overall vehicle operating costs for 660 vehicles was $11,384,880: an average of $17,250 per vehicle, a reduction of about $2,000 per vehicle.

== See also ==
- Harare-Kariba Highway (A1 Road)
- Nyanga & Eastern Highlands Highway (A2 Road)
- Harare-Beitbridge Highway (A4)
- Victoria Falls-Bulawayo Highway (A6)
- ZINARA
