= Lomagundi (disambiguation) =

Lomagundi is a former district of Zimbabwe (Southern Rhodiesia).

Lomagundi (cognate Nemakonde) may also refer to:

- Lomagundi College, a boarding school in the outskirts of Chinhoyi, Mashonaland West, Zimbabwe
- Lomagundi–Jatuli isotope excursion, a global carbon isotope excursion during the Boring Billion
