= Mapfungautsi State Forest =

Protected Forests in Zimbabwe

Mafungautsi State Forest
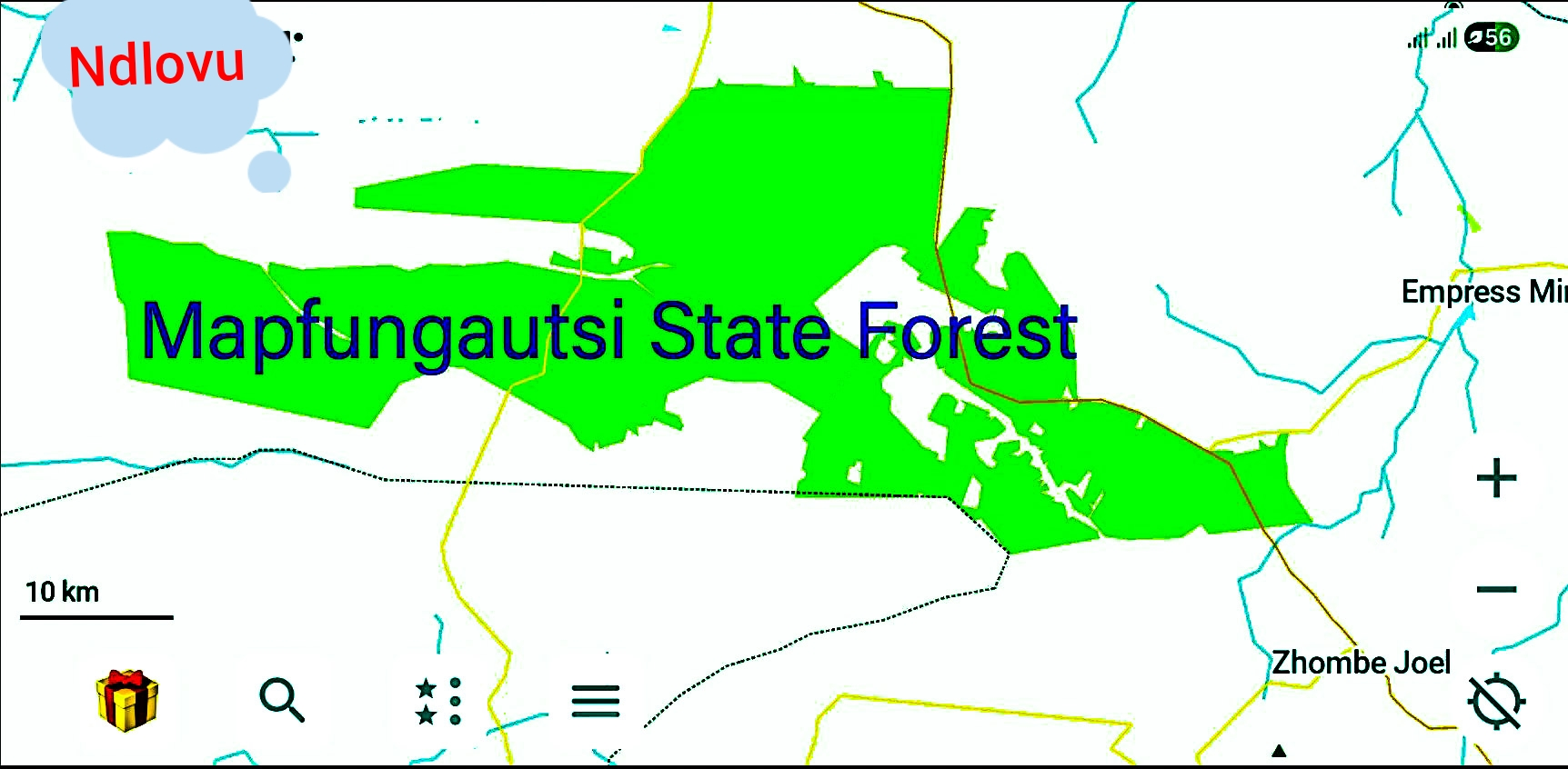
- Mapfungautsi State Forest
- Interactive map of Mafungautsi State Forest
- Location: Gokwe South District, Midlands Province, Zimbabwe
- Nearest city: Kwekwe
- Coordinates: 18°27′37″S 28°57′49″E
- Area: 82,100 ha (203,000 acres)
- Established: 1953
- Governing body: Forestry Commission

Mafungautsi State Forest is a protected forest located in Gokwe South District, Midlands Province, Zimbabwe. It is the third largest indigenous State forest in Zimbabwe, covering approximately 82,100 hectares

== History ==
The Mafungautsi State Forest, which does not encompass the whole of the Mapfungautsi Plateau (locally perceived as Mapfungautsi Mountains by easterly lowland communities), was demarcated as a State forest in 1953 (101,000 ha). However, in 1972, the north-eastern part of the forest was reclassified as a communal area, and some parts of the southern area were gazetted, reducing the forest's size.

== Ecology ==
Mafungautsi State Forest is a crucial watershed for the Sengwa-Mbumbusi, Lutope, and Ngondoma River system, which flow into the Sanyati river and eventually the Zambezi river. The forest is home to teak and mahogany tree species, but these are at risk due to deforestation and poaching.

== Conservation ==
The State Forest lies largely west of the Kwekwe-Gokwe Highway, starting from Chemagora T-Junction and stretching westward. In contrast, the plateau's more scenic side is situated east of the highway. Mapfungautsi State Forest is managed by the Forestry Commission, a central government body responsible for enforcing regulations and making arrests. However, the commission has faced challenges in driving out invaders, with reports of political interference hindering efforts to apprehend intruders.

== Threats ==
Mafungautsi State Forest faces significant threats from deforestation, with an estimated rate of 1.5% per year, three times the estimated average over the period 1999-2010.

== See also ==
Mapfungautsi

Sebungwe Region
