= Sengwa River =

River in Zimbabwe

Coordinates: 17.0609°S 28.0439°E

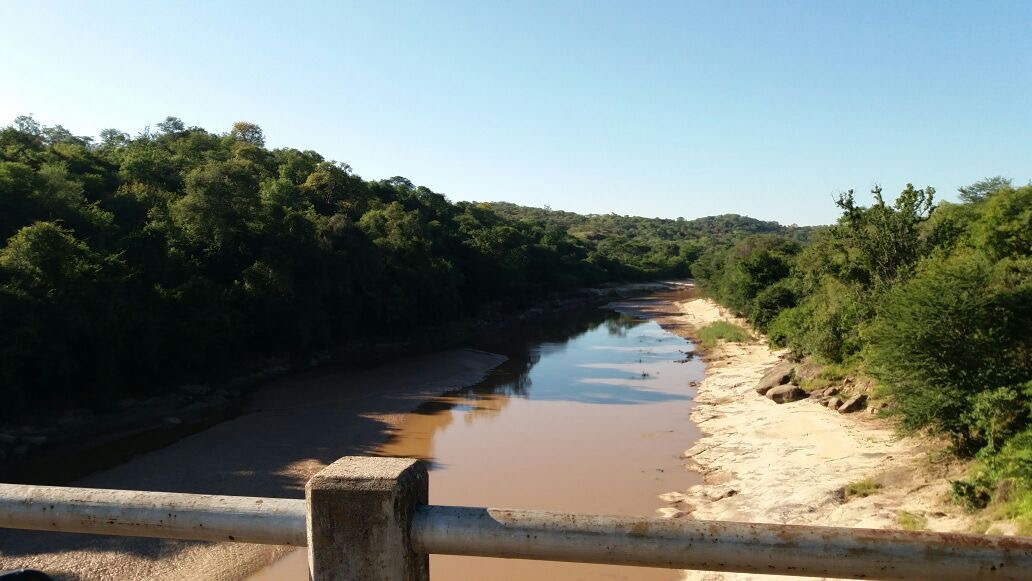
Sengwa in 2017

Rivers that emptys into the Kabira Reservoirs with the Sengwa (center)

Sengwa River (also known as Sengwe river/ Sengwi river) is a river in Zimbabwe. It is 279 km long. It flows through Mashonaland West and Matebeleland North in Midlands, Zimbabwe.

== Tributaries ==
Sengwa river has 25 tributaries, many of which are unnamed except the following:

- Lutope River
- Busi River
- Karungwizi River
- Yobi River
- Mutola River
