= Gokwe centre =

Gokwe
- Town
- Nickname: Gokwe Centre
- Location in Zimbabwe
- Coordinates: 18.22°S 28.94°E
- country: Zimbabwe
- Province: Midlands
- District: Gokwe South

Population (2022 census)
  - Total: 33,075
- Time zone: UTC+2 (Central Africa Time)

Gokwe Centre is a rural town in the Midlands province in Zimbabwe. The town is usually referred to as "Gokwe Centre," since it is part of the larger Gokwe region.

In popular Zimbabwean culture and media, Gokwe is often perceived as a place that is backward or uneducated. Numerous memes reference the phrase "Gokwe yazviita zvakare", which translates to "Gokwe has done it again." Gokwe is often likened to Ohio in the United States.

== Background ==
Gokwe was originally a government station. It housed a district commissioner, police, hospital, veterinary services and other government rural agencies. Primarily for the administration of the district, it was also the base for the control of the tsetse fly and its associated lethal disease trypanosomiasis (sleeping sickness).

== Historical Achievements ==
=== Growth Point Status ===
Gokwe centre was proclaimed a Growth Point in 1982 under the government's growth points policy. In July 2006, this culminated in a state proclamation making it a town.

=== Town Status ===
Gokwe Growth Point, then run by the Gokwe South Rural District Council, rapidly became a town, skipping the Rural Service Center status due to its rapid rate of development due to the Kwekwe-Gokwe Highway which improved connectivity to all parts of Zimbabwe through its Kwekwe end link into the A5 Harare to Bulawayo highway.

=== Caretaker Commission ===
The step to establish the administrative machinery of the town included the putting in place of a commission appointed by the minister for local government in terms of the urban councils act Chapter 29.15.9.2(b). This appointed commission was to run office until the coming in of elected councilors.

== Climate ==
Climate data for Gokwe (1961–1990)
Month	Jan	Feb	Mar	Apr	May	Jun	Jul	Aug	Sep	Oct	Nov	Dec	Year
Mean daily maximum °C (°F)	27.1 (80.8)	26.8 (80.2)	27.2 (81.0)	26.7 (80.1)	24.8 (76.6)	22.6 (72.7)	22.8 (73.0)	25.4 (77.7)	29.0 (84.2)	30.8 (87.4)	29.2 (84.6)	27.2 (81.0)	26.6 (79.9)
Mean daily minimum °C (°F)	17.4 (63.3)	17.3 (63.1)	16.5 (61.7)	14.8 (58.6)	11.4 (52.5)	8.7 (47.7)	8.4 (47.1)	10.9 (51.6)	14.7 (58.5)	17.5 (63.5)	17.8 (64.0)	17.5 (63.5)	14.4 (57.9)
Average rainfall mm (inches)	182.6 (7.19)	167.7 (6.60)	72.3 (2.85)	35.4 (1.39)	4.8 (0.19)	1.2 (0.05)	0.3 (0.01)	1.2 (0.05)	2.3 (0.09)	25.7 (1.01)	92.1 (3.63)	177.5 (6.99)	763.1 (30.05)
Average rainy days (≥ 1.0 mm)	15	13	8	3	1	0	0	0	1	4	9	14	68
Source: World Meteorological Organization

== Town Council ==
=== Initial Committee 2008 ===
The delimitation team divided Gokwe Center into 6 wards for the 2008 harmonized elections. Consequently, six councilors were elected, and as required two special interest councilors were appointed by the minister in terms of the urban councils act to form the first ever Gokwe Town Council.

=== Subsequent Committees ===
From the 2013 harmonized elections Gokwe Town Council is set in place and run according to the Urban Councils Act Chapter 29:15.

Gokwe Town Council is a member of the Urban Councils Association of Zimbabwe. As of 2016, Gokwe town councilor Esther Senga of Ward 3 (Green Valley) was a committee member of the Presidential Committee of UCAZ.

== Operations ==
=== Service Delivery ===
Gokwe Town Council has four departments, namely 1. Human Resources and Administration, 2. Finance, 3. Engineering (Works and Services), and 4. Housing, Health and Community Services.

The town council has built a $300,000 administration block as part of its service delivery.

Refuse collection is done on a regular basis and the council has engaged volunteer organizations such as religious groups, churches and women's clubs for litter monitoring as part of the Keep Gokwe Clean campaign.

Cheziya High School is the most known institution which offers A-level courses.

== Commerce and Industry ==
Industry in Gokwe is dominated by small scale formal and informal entrepreneurs, alongside a number of standard industrial organizations.

Gokwe centre contains many small retail shops, six major indigenous supermarkets, and wholesalers of international standards.

Gokwe centre also contains several banks, including Barclays, CBZ Bank Limited, POSB Bank, Agricultural Development Bank of Zimbabwe (Agribank), and other financial houses.

== Residential Areas ==
Gokwe town has six suburban settlements that include the low density, medium density and the high density.

=== Low density ===
- Green Valley
- Sasame
- Mapfungautsi Red roofs

=== Medium Density ===
- Cheziya
- Mapfungautsi Extension

=== High density ===
- Njelele
- Mapfungautsi
- Nyaradza

=== Plots ===
- Njelele Agro-plots

== Population ==
As of the 2022 census, Gokwe centre has 9,189 households comprising a total population of 33,075 people. This population includes 14,933 male and 18,142 female residents

== Government Departments ==
There are various government departments in Gokwe town that include the

- Social Welfare
- Ministry of Youth,
- Justice Ministry represented by Magistrate Court,
- Ministry of Education,
- Home Affairs,
- The District Administrator’s office for the Ministry of Local Government and Urban Development,
- Ministry of Transport that oversees the Kwekwe-Gokwe Highway and other roads and road traffic related matters.
- Ministry of Agriculture represented by AGRTEX official and the Department of Livestock and Veterinary Services.
- Water Resources Ministry represented by Zimbabwe National Water Authority (ZINWA) is one other ministry working flat out because all the water that the town needs for both domestic and industrial needs is borehole water. There are no nearby dams to supply the town with cheap water.

=== Parastatals ===
Parastatal organizations at the center are the

- Cotton Company of Zimbabwe (Cottco),
- Zimbabwe Electricity Transmission Distribution Company. (ZETDC),
- Grain Marketing Board,
- Zimbabwe National Water Authority (ZINWA)
- Public Service Commission
- Forestry Commission

to name a few.

=== Schools ===
There are Four Primary Schools and Four Secondary Schools in Gokwe Town. Primary Schools 1. St Paul's Primary School 2. Mapfungautsi Council Primary School 3. CZM Primary School 4. Gokwe Town St Agness Primary School

Secondary Schools 1. Cheziya Council High School 2. St Paul's High School 3. Njelele Government High School 4. LOGOS Empowerment Girls High School

=== Public Service ===
- The Zimbabwe Republic Police (ZRP),
- The Magistrate’s Court
- The Zimbabwe Prison Services.
- Gokwe Hospital

== Communications ==
- TelOne for telecommunications.
- ZimPost for postal services.
- Econet Cellular network provider
- NetOne Cellular network provider

== Transportation ==
- An aerodrome for small private planes which is popularly called Gokwe Airport.
- Bus station: Built up; with toilets, loading bays

== See also ==
- Kwekwe-Gokwe Highway
- Mutange Dam
