= Gokwe North District =

Region of Zimbabwe

Coordinates: 17°33′S 28°52′E

- administrative district
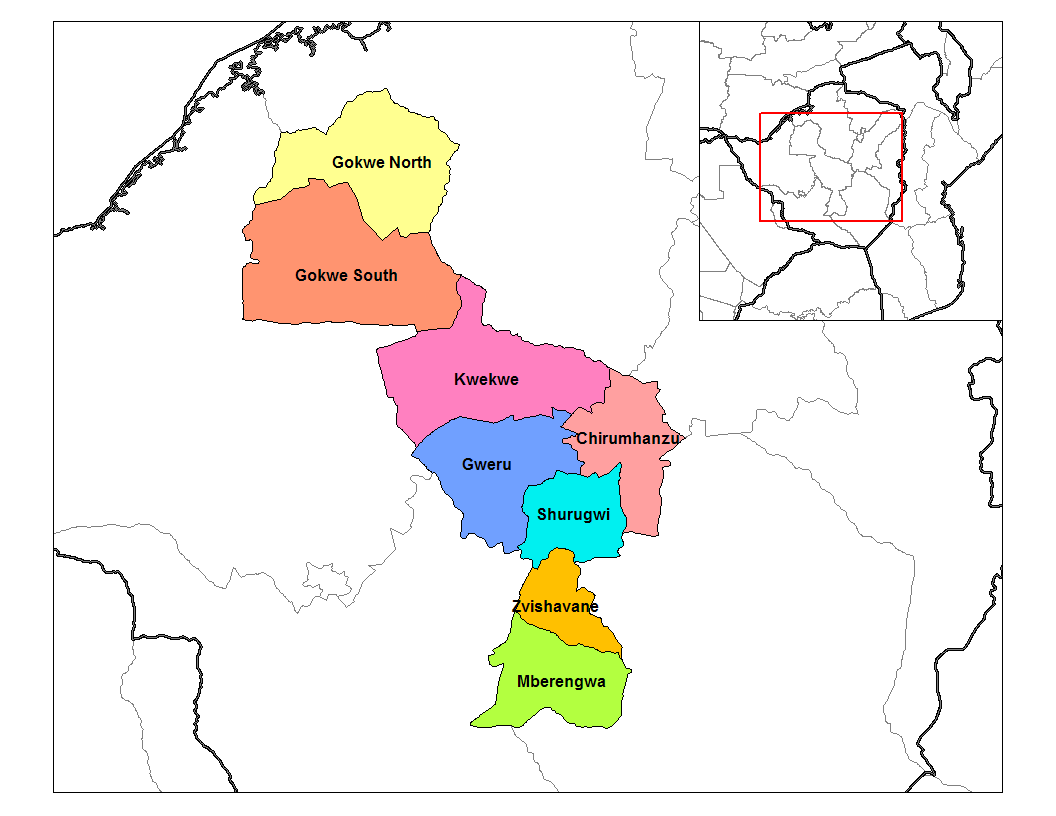
- Gokwe North District (yellow) in Midlands
- Country: Zimbabwe
- Province: Midlands

Area
  - Total: 7,268 km^{2} (2,806 sq mi)

Population (2022)
  - Total: 249,723
- Time zone: UTC+2 (CAT)

Gokwe North District is the northern of two administrative districts in the Gokwe region of the Midlands province of Zimbabwe. Its administrative seat is Nembudziya.

There are 36 wards under Gokwe North Rural District Council (GNRDC) evenly distributed in 4 constituencies. Nembudziya was a small growth point established due to the cotton farming activities as the majority of people in the area earn their living through agricultural activities.

Chief Jahane is one of the notable traditional individuals within the region. The Copper Queen (Sanyati) mine is located in ward 22. The Zenda mine is also found in ward 22. The Matize school is located 11 km north east of Copper Queen mine. Matize is one of the most beautiful villages of ward 22. People started settling in the area soon after independence. The local VaShangwe came from within the district from places such as Chinyenyetu, Kuwirirana, Nyamazengwe and Mudzongwe. People of the Karanga dialect came mainly from Shurugwi, Chivi, Gutu, Chirimuhanzu, Mberengwa and Zvishavane. Matize village thrives on cattle products, cotton and maize farming. Recently gold mine claims have been pegged with artisanal miners (makorokoza/maShurugwi). Matize village does not have a secondary school; the nearest secondary school is Kamhonde across Sanyati river in Makonde, Mashonaland West, this also applies to the nearest health center (Kamhonde clinic). Matize village falls under the jurisdiction of Headman Makore of the Shava totem. The paramount chief is Chireya, also of the Shava totem. Matize is located in the Sanyati Valley. The latitude is 900 m above sea level. The vegetation is dominated by Mopane, Mupfuti baobab, muvanga and mutondo trees. There are any streams which are tributaries of the Sanyati River. These include Matize, Mapfuti, Bowapuwa and Nyahondo. Neighboring villages include Mutukanyi, Mutivura, Ronga, Nyaurungwe and across Sanyati river Chirariro and Kamhonde in Mashonaland West.

Gokwe North District is found in ecological region 4, with arid and semi-arid conditions caused by the low average rainfall amounts of between 250 mm per year -800 mm per year. The temperatures range from 22-34 degrees Celsius (chiguye 2016). According to Brazer (2022), Gokwe district has many children out of school due to early marriage and pregnancy. Clean water shortages are very high with women and girls travelling long distances to fetch water from open sources, or queuing for more than an hour at boreholes. It is very difficult to achieve SDG 4 in Gokwe district considering the long distances between primary, secondary and high schools in the district.

== See also ==
- Gokwe South District
- Gokwe centre
