= Lomagundi =

Former district of Zimbabwe

Lomagundi is a former district of Zimbabwe, originally an alternative form of the name Nemakonde, who was a chief of the Shona in the area.

The eastern border of Lomagundi was the Great Dyke.
