= Binga District =

- administrative district
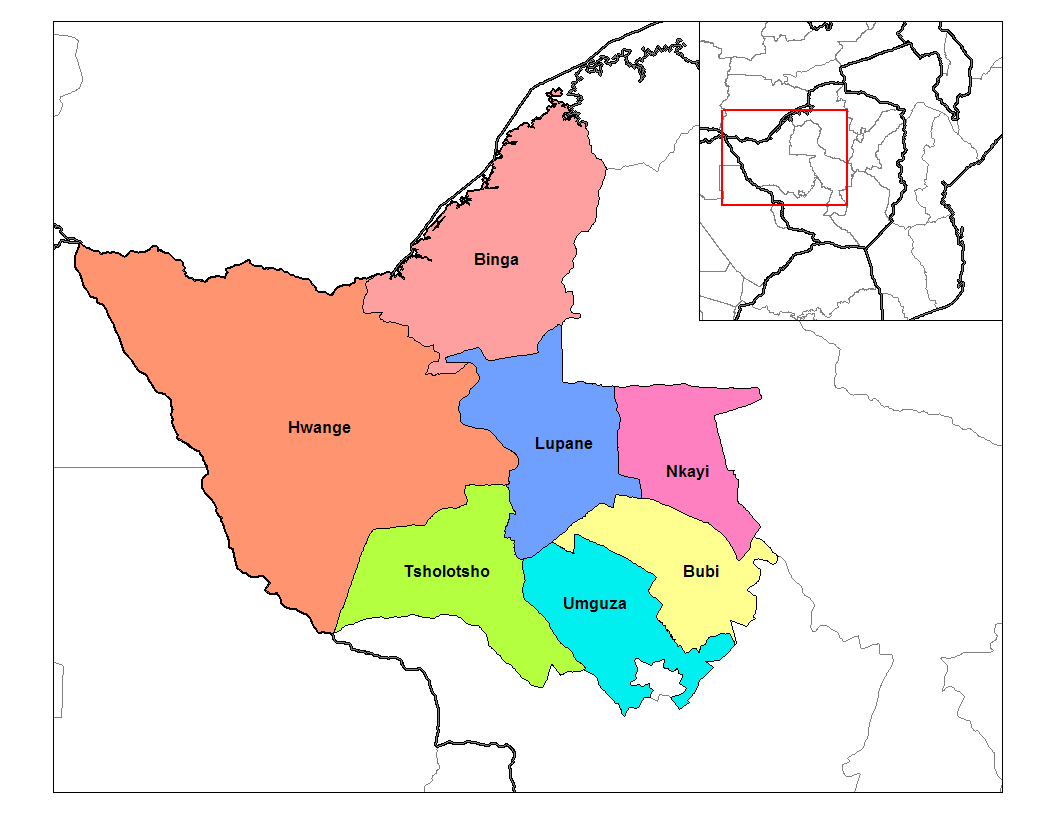
- Binga District in Matabeleland North
- Country: Zimbabwe
- Province: Matabeleland North

Population (2022)
  - Total: 159,982
- Time zone: UTC+2 (CAT)

Binga District (Binga District) is a district of Zimbabwe in southern Africa. It is located in Matabeleland North just south of Kariba Lake, across the lake from Zambia It lies along the southern Zambezi Escarpment.

The Tonga people inhabit the area.

== Boundaries ==
Binga District is an area of land bounded by a line drawn from;

- a point on the Zimbabwe-Zambia international boundary at map reference 35KPM098348 on the 1:50 000 Map Sengwa Sound 1628C3, Edition 2, southwards direct to a point on the former Sengwa River course at map reference 35KPM114145 on the 1:50 000 Map Chiwa 1728A1, Edition 2;
- thence proceeding generally southwards up the Sengwa River to the eastern boundary of Chizarira National Park,
- thence generally southwest-wards along the eastern boundaries of Chizarira National Park and Busi Communal Land and westwards along the south- eastern boundary of Dandanda Communal Land;
- thence generally westwards along the boundaries of Dandanda Communal Land to its westernmost point;
- thence southwards along the westernmost boundary of Dandanda Communal land; thence eastwards along the northern boundary of Lubimbi Communal land up to the northernmost beacon of remainder of Lot 4 Karna Block;
- thence generally south-westwards along the northern-western boundaries of Remainder of Lot 4 Karna Block and Lot 7A Karna Block up the westernmost beacon of Lot 7 A Karna Block;
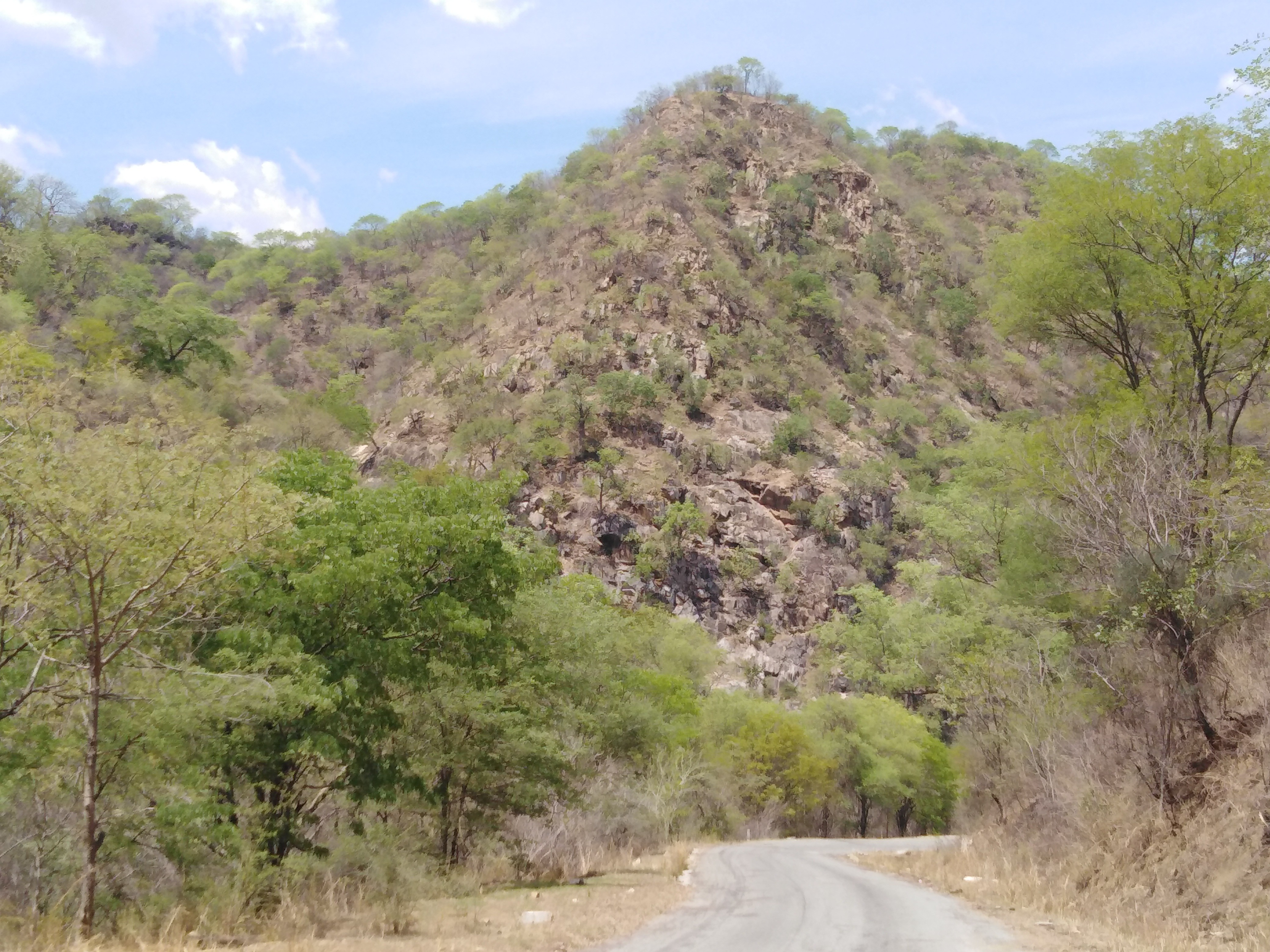
- Binga hiils
  thence proceeding generally westwards along the northern boundaries of Lot 8 Karna Block and the Remainder of Karna Block to exclude them up the intersection by the Shangani River;
- thence up the Shangani River to a point at a map reference 35KNK259556 on the 1:50 000 Map Kamativi 1827A3, edition 1,
- thence proceeding generally north-westwards to a point at map reference 35KNK249563 on the 1: 50 000 Map Kamativi 1827A3, Edition 1;
- thence proceeding generally northwards along the western and north-western boundaries of Lubimbi Communal Land to a point at map reference 35KNK315618 on the 1:50 000 Map Kamativi 1827A3, Edition 1;
- thence generally north-westwards along the south-western and western boundaries of Manjolo Communal Land to the southern boundary of Kavira Forest Land,
- thence westwards along the southern boundary of Kavira Forest Land to the Gwayi River,
- thence generally northwards down the Gwayi River to the Zimbabwe-Zambia international boundary;
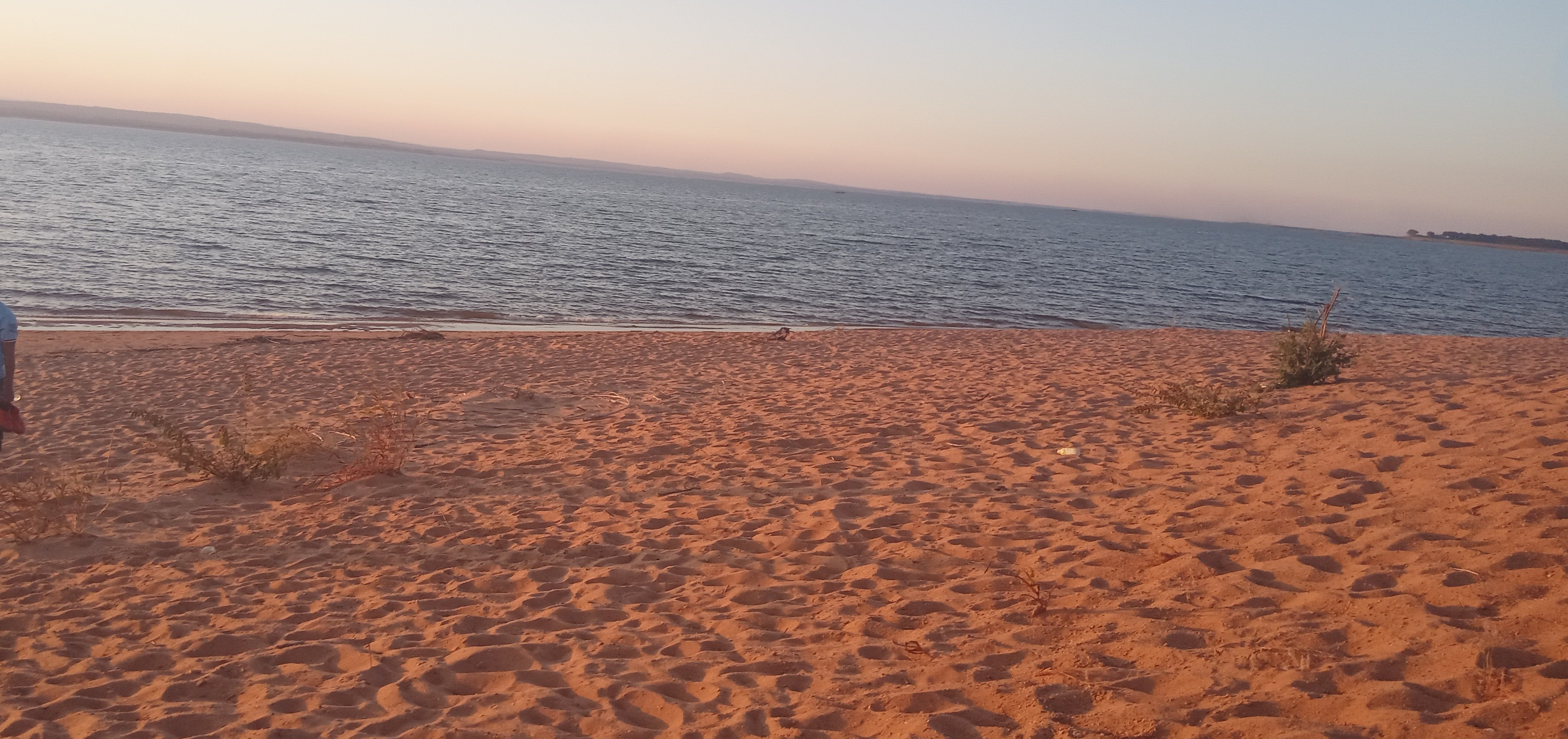
- Binga sand beach
  thence north-eastwards along the Zimbabwe- Zambia international boundary to the starting point.

== Administrative divisions, constituencies and people ==
There are twenty-one wards in the district, which is divided into two parliamentary constituencies: Binga North Constituency with twelve wards and South Binga Constituency with nine wards. The separate constituencies were created in 2008. Joel Gabuza is MP for Binga South while Prince Dubeko Sibanda presides over Binga North.

Among the areas in Binga North Constituency are: Chizarira, Siabuwa, Cheete, Siansundu, Siantula, Mujere and Manjolo.

== Settlements ==
The town of Binga is the largest settlement. It lies on the south eastern shore of Lake Kariba. Most of it was constructed to rehouse the BaTonga people whose homeland was flooded by the creation of the Kariba reservoir in the late 1950s. The Chibwatatata Hot Springs lie near the town at what is known as Rest Camp area. It is a prime tourist area and was previously a shrine for local Tonga people under the leadership of one Maalila. Maalila was possessed by mpande (muzimu wamvula). He led rainmaking ceremonies at the hot springs. There are also settlements under the following areas and chiefs:

- Chief Binga
- Chief Dobola
- Chief Saba
- Chief Sikalenge
- Chief Sikalenge
- Chief Simupa Village
- Chief Sinakooma
- Chief Sinampande
- Chief Sinakatenge Village
- Chief Sinansengwe
- Chief Siansaali Village
- Impampa
- James
- Kabulawu
- Kariyangwe
- Lubimbi
- Lusulu
- Manjolo
- Matinka
- Mlibizi
- Pashu
- Saba
- Siabuwa
- Siamunchembu
- Tinde
- Zyakamana Village (Zikamanus)

== Economy and development ==
Binga District is a rural district that is significantly underdeveloped, with only gravel roads, which are car hostile especially during the rainy season. It is also one of the most sparsely populated districts of the country.

Binga District is famous for its growing of cannabis, known locally as dagga or mbanje. The consumption of cannabis in the Binga District has been described as traditional since pre-colonial times, and is considered by people from without to be an integral part of the Tonga culture. However, it must be pointed out that consumption of cannabis is often considered a devious pursuit especially, since 1955, in light of federal laws to control the importation, exportation, production, possession, sale, distribution and use of dangerous drugs, despite its use as a traditional medicine. There is a wrong impression among people from the rest of Zimbabwe that people from Binga are legally entitled to plant, harvest, process and smoke cannabis freely.

Stereotypes against Tonga people

Recently, the ministry of primary and secondary education of Zimbabwe has been caught offside following the publication of a secondary level textbooks for the new subject of Total Heritage Studies. It was immediately gathered that some of the contents was seen as reinforcing stereotypes held against Tonga people. For instance, the authors Mashaar S and BB Matseketsa plagiarized Tongan Kingdom courtship and passed it as Zimbabwe Tonga culture without verification and in another section they insinuate that Tonga culture accepts incest as a marriage enhancing activity. All this had been disputed by Tonga people and many have seen the new subject and content as carelessly written or is meant promote Shona supremacy. While the issue is still undergoing debate, indications are that Tonga people will petition the Permanent Secretary in the ministry of education for the retraction of the approved textbook and allowing native Tonga input.
