= Gokwe South District =

Administrative district in Zimbabwe

Coordinates: 17°15′S 29°01′E

- administrative district
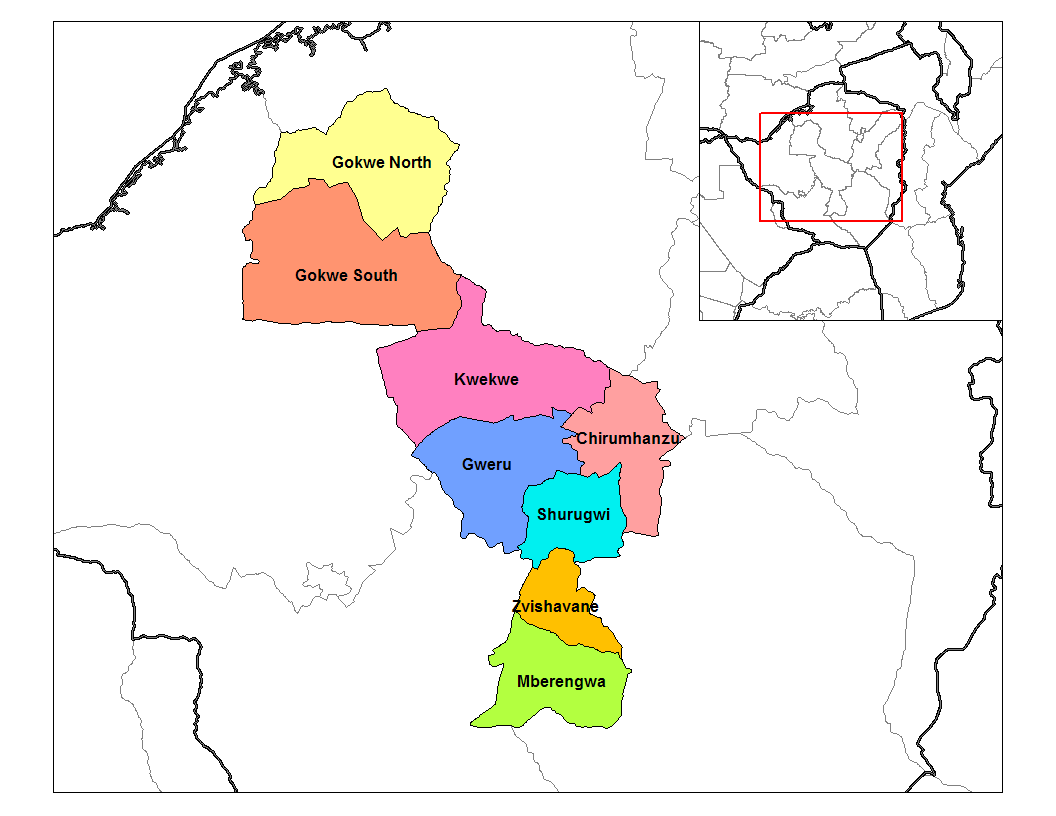
- Gokwe South District (orange) in Midlands
- Country: Zimbabwe
- Province: Midlands

Area
  - Total: 11,124 km^{2} (4,295 sq mi)

Population (2022)
  - Total: 317,554
- Time zone: UTC+2 (CAT)

Gokwe South District is one of the eight administrative districts of the Midlands Province of Zimbabwe. The district administrative seat is located in Gokwe Town also known as Gokwe Centre and the District Administrator is the focal person in terms of all district administrative matters. The district is divided into two administrative entities under the Ministry of Local Government, Public Works and National Housing, which are Gokwe South Rural District Council and Gokwe Town Council. The two district administrative entities were legally setup under the Urban Councils Act of 2015 [Chapter 29:15] and Rural District Councils Act [Chapter 29:13] under the constitution of Zimbabwe. The district is further subdivided into 01 senatorial constituency, 05 parliamentary constituencies and 33 council wards. These constituencies and wards are shared between these two administrative entities of Gokwe South District. According to the 2012 ZIMSTAT National Census Statistics the population of the district was at 330 036 people. Gokwe district is in the north-western part of Zimbabwe its average temperature vacillates at 40 degrees Celsius. Gokwe South District shares its boundaries with 06 districts, namely Binga District, Nkayi District, Kwekwe District, Kadoma District, Lupane District and Gokwe North District.

== Background ==
Gokwe South District was created from the division of Gokwe District and had initially been established in 1898. As a result of the introduction of Land Apportionment Act (LAA) of 1930 by the colonial masters, displacement of a number of people from different places to Gokwe began in the 1950s when the Native Land Husbandry Act (NLHA) was put across and marked the implementation of the LAA. As a result of these people migratings to Gokwe, population increased thus leading to the division of Gokwe District to Gokwe North and Gokwe South Districts. The Rural District Councils Act of 1988, which was implemented from July 1993 is the piece of legislation which Gokwe South District came into existence as a result of. This Act is known as the “amalgamation” act, because its main aim was to amalgamate the local authorities responsible for “commercial” and “communal” farming areas within each district. However, it also resulted in some changes to district boundaries and in Gokwe District, where there were no large-scale commercial farms, its main impact was the division of the district into two.

== Governance structure ==
Gokwe South District has 01 senatorial constituency, 05 parliamentary constituencies, 33 council wards. Constituencies are led by an elected member of parliament and the wards are elected by an elected Councillor.

=== Senatorial constituency ===
Gokwe South District has one senatorial constituency and is led by an elected member of the Senate or Upper House of the Zimbabwe Parliament.

=== Parliamentary constituencies ===
The district has 05 parliamentary constituencies and are led by an elected member of the Lower House or National Assembly Zimbabwe Parliament.

SER	NAME OF CONSTITUENCY	CLASSIFICATION
01	Gokwe Central Constituency	URBAN
02	Gokwe Sasame Constituency	RURAL
03	Gokwe Kana Constituency	RURAL
04	Gokwe Mapfungautsi Constituency	RURAL
05	Gokwe Sengwa	RURAL

=== Local council wards ===
Local council wards are grouped into either urban wards or rural wards. Urban wards being under Town Councils or cities whereas rural wards being under Rural District Councils.

WARD NUMBER	NAME OF WARD OR AREA	CLASSIFICATION
01		URBAN
02		URBAN
03		URBAN
04		URBAN
05		URBAN
06		URBAN
07		RURAL
08		RURAL
09		RURAL
10		RURAL
11		RURAL
12		RURAL
13		RURAL
14		RURAL
15		RURAL
16		RURAL
17		RURAL
18		RURAL
19		RURAL
20		RURAL
21		RURAL
22		RURAL
23		RURAL
24		RURAL
25		RURAL
26		RURAL
27		RURAL
28		RURAL
29		RURAL
30		RURAL
31		RURAL
32		RURAL
33		RURAL

== Traditional leadership ==
Gokwe South District like other districts with are classified as being rural is subdivided into different areas of jurisdiction under various chiefs. The chief is the highest ranking traditional leader for those jurisdictions in Gokwe South District and there are 05 chiefs. Each chief has headmen and village heads under their jurisdiction. Chief Jahana and an estimated 8 000 of his people returned to Matabeleland South from Gokwe and were resettled at Gwamanyenga area. The Jahana chieftainship was relocated back to Fort Rixon, Matabeleland South Province area after they successfully claimed back their ancestral land during Zimbabwe's land reform period. The area was officially which was previously under his jurisdiction reverted to Chief Njelele's jurisdiction and some people may still casually refer to it as Chief Jahana area.

SER	CHIEFTAINSHIP	NAME	STATUS
01	Njelele	Mischeck Njelele	Substantive
02	Mkoka	Doubt Nkomo	Substantive
03	Sai	Gideon Ngwanda Ncube	Substantive
04	Nemangwe	Elijah Musongo	Substantive
05	Jiri	Chipo Moyo	Substantive

== Education ==
=== Secondary schools ===
Secondary or high schools in Gokwe South District are under the jurisdiction of the Ministry of Primary and Secondary Education.

- BATANAI GOKWE; MUYAMBI VILLAGEW CHIEF MKOKA
- BENGWE; MUTAMBURIGWA VILLAGE CHIEF NEMANGWE
- Chevecheve Secondary School

MUCHABAYIWA VILLAGE, CHIEF NJELELE

- CHEZIYA GOKWE HIGH;

KAMBASHA BARRACKS GOKWE TOWN

- CHIDOMA; MAWANA VILLAGE CHIEF NJELELE
- CHISINA (MTANKI); CHADAKUFA VILLAGE CHIEF NJELELE
- CHITOMBO HIGH; MADHUVEKO VILLAGE CHIEF SAI
- CHOTO/TAFARA; CHOTO VILLAGE CHIEF JIRI
- COMMUNITY STUDY CENTRE STAND NUMBER 1495 INDUSTRIAL SITE GOKWE TOWN
- DEFE; DEFE CHIEF SAYI
- DULI - TRUST COLLEGE; STAND NUMBER 1146 MAPFUNGAUTSI
- DZIVARENGAMWA; MANYEPA VILLAGE CHIEF SAI
- GANYE; BANDA VILLAGE CHIEF NEMANGWE
- NJELELE; STAND NO. 1771 NYARADZA TOWNSHIP GOKWE TOWN
- NYAJE; TANYANYIWA VILLAGE CHIEF NJELELE
- NYAMACHENI; TAKAENDESA VILLAGE CHIEF NJELELE
- NYARADZA; NDLALAMBI CHIEF NEMANGWE
- NYOKA; HIGH DHLANA VILLAGE CHIEF NEMANGWE
- RUFARO; (KASANGO) KANYEMBA VILLAGE CHIEF SAYI
- RUTENDO; MAWARE VILLAGE CHIEF SAI
- SAWI; (GWARISONDE) GWADA VILLAGE CHIEF NEMANGWE
- SAYI; SAI VILLAGE CHIEF SAI
- SELIMA; SIYAKATAZA VILLAGE CHIEF MKOKA
- ST PAULS GOKWE; STAND NUMBER 3313 MAPFUNGAUTSI GOKWE
- SUNGANAI; DOKOTERA VILLAGE, CHIEFE NEMANGWE
- TARE ST BONIFACE; MUDZIMIRI VILLAGE CHIEF NEMANGWE
- THE LOGOS EMPOWERMENT GIRLS COLLEGE; RUHWAYA VILLAGE CHIEF NJELELE
- TICHAKUNDA; MKOKA VILLAGE MKOKA
- TONGWE; MUZA VILLAGE CHIEF NJELELE
- VULINDLELA; MVUNDLA VILLAGE CHIEF NJELELE
- W. BOOMS COLLEGE; 1423 LIGHT INDUSTRY GOKWE TOWN
- ZHAMBA SECONDARY
- GAWA; PUTUNGWANE VILLAGE CHIEF NEMNAGWE
- GOMOGURU; MAGEGE VILLAGE CHIEF NJELELE
- GUKURE MAKOMO VILLAGE CHIEF NEMANGWE
- GULUKA; SECONDARY ZARANYIKA VILLAGE CHIEF MKOKA
- GWAMURE; MABHUKU VILLAGE CHIEF NJELELE
- GWEHAVA; MADZIVANZIRA VILLAGE CHIEF NJELELE
- HOVANO; CHITUNGWA VILLAGE CHIEF NJELELE
- KANASECONDARY; KANA MISSSION
- KASUWE; DICKSON VILLAGE CHIEF NEMANGWE
- KATSUNGA SECONDARY; MUTSANYAMATE VILLAGE CHIEF SAI
- KUSHINGA (RUMHUMHA); RUMHUMA VILLAGE CHIEF NJELELE
- LUKUKWE CHITEPO; MAGON'O VILLAGE CHIEF MKOKA
- MABOKE; HAKUNAVANHU VILLAGE CHIEF JIRI
- MACHAKATA; MAZA VILLAGE CHIEF NJELELE
- MANYONI; ZIMWARA VILLAGE CHIEF SAI
- MAPFUNGAUTSI; SHABANI VILLAGE CHIEF NJELELE
- MARIMASIMBE; NYIKA VILLAGE CHIEFE JIRI
- MARIRANGWE; MARIGANO VILLAGE CHIEF JIRI
- MASUKA; SECONDARY NEMARINGA VILLAGE CHIEF SAI
- MATEME; PASO VILLAGE CHIEF MKOKA
- (RUJEKO) HIGH; MATETA 2 VILLAGE CHIEF SAI
- MAZINYO; MWENE VILLAGE CHIEF MKOKA
- MBUNGU; MASOCHA VILLAGE CHIEF MKOKA GOKWE
- MUCHADEYI DZVUKE BEZUNGU VILLAGE CHIEF MKOKA
- MUCHIRINJI; NHIDZA VILLAGE CHIEF SAYI
- NEMANGWE; MUSARURWA VILLAGE CHIEF NEMANGWE
- NGOMENI; CHIVIMBO

=== Primary schools ===
Primary schools in Gokwe South District are under the jurisdiction of the Ministry of Primary and Secondary Schools. Source

- RUGORA; NHAUDZAWANDA VILLAGE CHIEF NEMANGWE
- BATANAI; CHIBABAIRA VILLAGE CHIEF NEMANGWE
- BLUE GUM; NYAHUNA VILLAGE CHIEF NJELELE
- BOPOMA; DHIRORI VILLAGE CHIEF SAI
- BOVA; SIDODIWE VILLAGE CHIEF NJELELE
- BOYI; MARIMIRASHIRI VILLAGE CHIEF NEMANGWE
- CHAMATENDERA; KABIRA VILLAGE CHIEF NEMANGWE
- CHARAMA; MUBAIWA VILLAGE CHIEF SAI
- CHAVANYATI; ISAYA VILLAGE CHIEF NJELELE
- CHEGAMA; RUMHUMHA VILLAGE CHIEF NEMANGWE
- CHEHAMBA; SIAMANONZI VILLAGE CHIEF MKOKA
- CHEHANGA; MANJENGWA VILLAGE CHIEF JIRI
- CHEMBA; PISA VILLAGE CHIEF MKOKA
- CHEMOWA; JARICHARI VILLAGE CHIEF NJELELE
- CHIBASA; MAGAMA VILLAGE CHIEF NEMAMGWE
- CHIDAMOYO; BHARIWA VILLAGE CHIEF
- CHIDOMA; MAWANA VILLAGE CHIEF NJELELE
- CHIEDZA; MAZHARA VILLAGE CHIEF SAI
- CHITA CHEZVIPO ZVEMOTO (CZM); RUHWAYA VILLAGE CHIEF NJELELE
- CHIUMBU; MUZA VILLAGE CHIEF NJELELE
- CHIURAI; NAISON VILLAGE CHIEF NEMANGWE
- CHOTO; CHOTO VILLAGE CHIEF JIRI
- DAVAMBI; NDAVAMBI VILLAGE CHIEF NJELELE
- DOPOTA; ZCC DEFE DOPOTA HQ CHIEF MUTENDI
- DZIRE; TAMBATUBISI VILLAGE CHIEF NEMANGWE
- DZVUKE; DZVUKE VILLAGE CHIEF MKOKA
- GABABE; FUSI VILLAGE CHIEF NJELELE
- GADZA; GADAZA VILLAGE CHIEF MKOKA
- GANYE; FUNDIKWA VILLAGE CHIEF NEMANGWE
- GANYUNGU; CHAVHUNDUKA VILLAGE CHIEF NJELELE
- GAWA; UTUNGWANE VILLAGE CHIEF NEMANAGWE
- GOKWE ST AGNES; CHIPERE VILLAGE CHIEF NJELELE
- GWANYIKA; MATENGANYIKA VILLAGE CHIEF NJELELE
- GWARUSONDE; XOCHIWA VILLAGE CHIEF NEMANGWE
- GWAVI; SIYAGIJIMA VILLAGE CHIEF NEMANGWE
- GWEHAVA; MARUMISA VILLAGE CHIEF NJELELE
- GWENUNGU; HONDO VILLAGE CHIEF NJELELE
- GWENYA; MANJONJO VILLAGE CHIEF NJELELE
- GWETSANGA; RINGISAI VILLAGE CHIEF JIRI
- HUCHU; DOKOTERA VILLAGE CHIEF NEMANGWE
- INSUKAMINI; MOSES VILLAGE CHIEF NJELELE
- JAHANA; GUNDWANE VILLAGE CHIEF NJELELE
- JIRI; MADZIKANDA VILLAGE CHIEF JIRI
- JOBORINGO
- JORORO; CHALIBAMBA VILLAGE CHIEF NEMANGWE
- KADZIRAMWANDA; MAWARE VILLAGE CHIEF SAI
- KAGUTA; CHIKWAMBA VILLAGE CHIEF NEMANGWE
- KAMBE; SIBABI VILLAGE CHIEF MKOKA
- KANETOWA; MAJAVE VILLAGE CHIEF SAI
- KANGURA; JOHN VILLAGE CHIEFSAI
- KAPFUNDE; CHARIRA VILLAGE CHIEF NEMANGWE
- KAROVA; TADZIMIGWA VILLAGE CHIEF SAI
- KARUWARE; KARIKOGA VILLAGE CHIEF SAI
- KASANGO; KANYEMBA VILLAGE CHIEF SAYI
- KASIKANA; ZEBEDIA VILLAGE CHIEFE NJELELE
- KASUWE; GUMIREMHETE VILLAGE CHIEF NEMANGWE
- KRIMA; PENSELA VILLAGE CHIEF NJELELE
- KUBENENGURIRA; DANGAREMBIZI VILLAGE CHIEF SAI
- KWARAMBA; KWARAMBA KURUWA VILLAGE CHIEF NEMANGWE
- LUKUKWE; NAISON VILLAGE CHIEF MKOKA
- LUTOTSHWANA; BHENYU VILLAGE HEADMAN MSALA
- MABOKE; MABOKE VILLAGE
- MACHAKATA; MAZA VILLAGE CHIEF NJELELE
- MAGEDE; MAGEDE VILLAGE CHIEF MKOKA
- MALIYAMI; SHABANI VILLAGE CHIEF NJELELE
- MAMHANGWA; MUSHAWIDI VILLAGE CHIEF NEMANGWE
- MANGISI; MUCHENI VILLAGE CHIEF SAI
- MANYENA; MESO VILLAGE CHIEF SAI
- MANYEPA; MANYEPA VILLAGE CHIEF SAI
- MANYEWU; GUMIREMHETE VILLAGE CHIEF SAI
- MANYONI; KURURA VILLAGE CHIEF SAI
- MAPFUMO; MAPFUMO VILLAGE CHIEF NJELELE
- MAPFUNGAUTSI PRIMARY; STAND NUMBER 2322 MAPFUNGAUTSI GOKWE
- MAPIWA; MAKIWA VILLAGE CHIEF NJELELE
- MAPU; KAITANO VILLAGE CHIEF NJELELE
- MARIRANGWE; CHIREVEREVE VILLAGE CHIEF JIRI
- MASAWI; MANQUMA VILLAGE CHIEF NJELELE
- MASEKESA; ZVAWANDA VILLAGE CHIEF JIRI
- MASUKA; NDAEDZWA VILLAGE CHIEF SAI
- MASUKA; MANDIPOTA VILLAGE CHIEF SAI
- MATEME SDA; MAGUMURA VILLAGE CHIEF MKOKA
- MATETA 1; MATETA VILLAGE CHIEF NEMANGWE
- MATETA 2; MATETA VILLAGE CHIEF SAI
- MATURA; MATURA VILLAGE CHIEF JIRI
- MAWISA; NDOSA VILLAGE CHIEF SAI
- MAZINYO ST HUGHS; MWENE VILLAGE CHIEF MKOKA
- MBUNGU; MASOCHA VILLAGE CHIEF MKOKA GOKWE
- MKOKA; MKOKA VILLAGE CHIEF MKOKA
- MLALAZI; MLALAZI VILLAGE CHIEF NEMANGWE
- MSALA; SIAMEJA VILLAGE HEADMAN MSALA
- MTANKI SDA; MTAGWI VILLAGE CHIEF NJELELE
- MUCHIRINJI; NHIDZA VILLAGE
- MUDZIMUNDIRINGE; KATEMA VILLAGE CHIEF JIRI
- MUDZONGWE; FAKAZI VILLAGE CHIEF NJELELE
- MURANDU; MURANDU VILLAGE CHIEF NJELELE
- MURWIRA; MANHEMBE VILLAGE, CHIEF JIRI
- MUSITA; MATEEESANWA VILLAGE CHIEF NEMANGWE
- MUTANGE; CHADAKUFA VILLAGE CHIEF NJELELE
- MUTENDI; MUDZVOVA VILLAGE CHIEF MUTENDI GOKWE SOUTH
- MUYAMBI; MUYAMBI CHIEF MKOKA
- MWAMBANI; KHUMBUSI VILLAGE CHIEF MKOKA
- MWEMBESI; SOTILE VILLAGE CHIEF NJLELELE
- NDARIRE; MUTSVANGI VILLAGE CHIEF MKOKA
- NDHLALAMBI; SEVEN VILLAGE CHIEF NEMANGWE
- NGANI; MKONDO VILLAGE CHIEF NEMANGWE
- NGOMENI; CHIVIMBO VILLAGE, CHIEF SAI GOKWE
- NGONDOMA; MINARA VILLAGE CHIEF NJELELE
- NHONGO; MBEKA VILLAGE CHIEF NJELELE
- NYAGOMBE; MAWARE VILLAGE CHIEF NEMANGWE
- NYAHUNI; MAKAI VILLAGE CHIEF SAI
- NYAJE; DUMEZWENI VILLAGE CHIEF MKOKA
- NYAMACHENI; TAKAENDESA VILLAGE CHIEF NJELELE
- NYAMHUNGA; MPINDI VILLAGE CHIEF SAI
- NYARADZA; MABIWA VILLAGE CHIEF NEMANGWE
- NYARUPAKWE; JEFREY VILLAGE CHIEF NJELELE
- PARADZA; PARADZA VILLAGE, CHIEF JIRI, GOKWE
- RONGA RONGA; SIYAMWANJA VILLAGE CHIEF SAI
- RUGORA; NYUWANI VILLAGE CHIEF NEMANGWE
- SACRED HEART; SIANUNGU VILLAGE CHIEF MKOKA
- SASAME; GANDIWA VILLAGE CHIEF NEMANGWE
- SATENGWE; NAISON VILLAGE CHIEF NJELELE
- SAVARANDA; SIYAMUYALA VILLAGE CHIEF NEMANGWE
- SAWI; GWADA VILLAGE CHIEF NEMANGWE
- SAYI; SAYI VILLAGE CHIEF SAI
- SELIMA; BHAGU
- SENGWA; CHITUNGWA VILLAGE CHIEF NJELELE
- SIMBE; JUCHU VILLAGE CHIEF NJELELE
- SIZANANI; CHAMBANI VILLAGE CHIEF NEMANGWE
- ST AGNES CRECHE AND PRE-SCHOOL; RUHWAYA VILLAGE CHIEF NJELELE
- ST BONIFACE TARE; ZAREVA VILLAGE CHIEF NEMANGWE
- ST CUTHBETHS MSORO; CHAPINDUKA VILLAGE CHIEF NJELELE
- ST PAUL; STAND NUMBER 3313 MAPFUNGAUTSI GOKWE
- SUNGWIZA; MASHOVE VILLAGE CHIEF NEMANGWE
- SVISVI; MANDABA VILLAGE CHIEF NEMANGWE
- TACHI; TACHI BUSINESS CENTRE CHIEF MKOKA
- ZAMBEZI; MPARAGWA VILLAGE CHIEF NEMANGWE
- ZAROVA; MAMVURA VILLAGE CHIEF NEMANGWE
- ZENGEYA; PEDZERAI VILLAGE CHIEF JIRI
- ZHAMBA; CHIDHEREMA VILLAGE CHIEF SAI
- ZHOMBE SDA; MARIMIROFA VILLAGE CHIEF NJELELE
- ZIMBODZA; TAGARA

== See also ==
- Gokwe North District
- Gokwe centre
- [Map matura primary school
