= Munyati River =

Munyati Umniati
- The Sanyati basin

Location
- Country: Zimbabwe

The Munyati River (also known as the Umniati River, and as the Sanyati River for part of its length) is a river in Zimbabwe. Under the Rhodesian administration, it was officially named the Umniati, but its spelling was changed in 1983 to more closely resemble the correct Shona pronunciation.

The river rises in Mashonaland East, just north of Chivhu, and approximately 100 km (62 miles) south of Harare. It runs approximately north-west and for much of its length it originally formed the southern border of Mashonaland province, and today is largely the southern border of Mashonaland West. The river is joined by the Mupfure River (also known as the Umfuli). Below this point, the river is often referred to as the Sanyati. After a total of 500 km (310 miles) the river flows into Lake Kariba (the section of the Zambezi between the Kariba Dam and the Batoka Gorge), making it part of the Zambezi Basin.

The river flow is highly variable, reflecting the sharp distinction in the local climate between dry and wet seasons. Between December and May it flows strongly and is about 3 m (9.8 ft) deep on the plateau, and 80 to 100 m (260 to 330 ft) in breadth (although less deep) on its lower reaches. During the rest of the year, it is much reduced and slower-flowing, usually only 2 m (6.6 ft) deep, and almost drying up on rare occasions during serious droughts; as last in 1984.

== Gandavaroyi Falls ==
The biggest drop on the river is at Gandavaroyi Falls (Ganderowe Falls). As in Shona, ganda (kanda) means "to throw", and varoyi means "witches", "with typical poetry and precision, the local people have named the cataract after the picturesque practice they had of throwing reputed witches over the waterfall." The place was believed to be sacred and even this day, few locals prefer to visit this place. After this drop, the major tributary is Mvumvudze river which passes through Vashe

== See also ==
- Munyati
- Southern Africa
- Wildlife of Zimbabwe
