= 7th Parliament of Zimbabwe =

| ← | 6th Parliament | 8th Parliament | → |
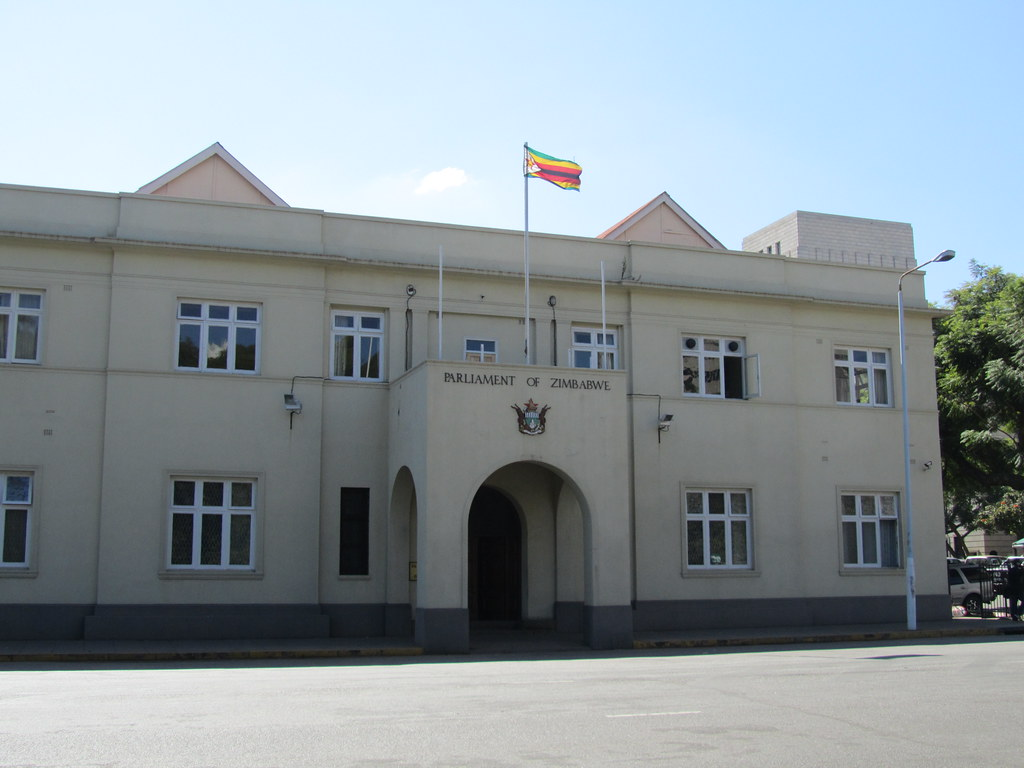
- Parliament House, Harare

Overview
- Legislative body: Parliament of Zimbabwe
- Jurisdiction: Zimbabwe
- Meeting place: Parliament House, Harare
- Term: 25 August 2008 – 28 June 2013
- Election: 2008 Zimbabwean general election
- Government: Government of National Unity
- Website: parlzim.gov.zw

House of Assembly
- Members: 210 → 215 (Note: Following the Global Political Agreement in 2009, five extra seats were created in the House of Assembly for the Vice-Presidents, Prime Minister and Deputy Prime Ministers.)
- Speaker: Lovemore Moyo
- Deputy Speaker: Nomalanga Khumalo
- Clerk: Austin Zvoma
- Party control: MDC-T

Senate
- Members: 93 → 99 (Note: Following the Global Political Agreement in 2009, six extra seats were created in the Senate for MDC-nominated members.)
- President: Edna Madzongwe
- Deputy President: Naison Ndlovu
- Clerk: Austin Zvoma
- Party control: ZANU-PF (Note: The Chiefs typically vote in line with ZANU-PF Senators.)

Sessions
- 1st: 26 August 2008 – 22 July 2009
- 2nd: 6 October 2009 – 12 July 2010
- 3rd: 13 July 2010 – 5 September 2011
- 4th: 6 September 2011 – 30 October 2011
- 5th: 30 October 2012 – 28 June 2013

In Zimbabwe's 2008 general election, 210 members were elected to the House of Assembly – one for each parliamentary constituency. The Constitution of Zimbabwe had been amended in 2007 to increase the number of constituency seats from 120 to 210. The new constituencies were drawn out in the 2007 Delimitation Report.

As part of the election, a new Senate was also elected. 60 members - six for each of Zimbabwe's 10 provinces - were elected for the sixty senatorial constituencies that had been drawn up as part of the 2007 Delimitation Report. 10 senators were Provincial Governors appointed by the President. 16 traditional Chiefs were elected by the Council of Chiefs, while the President and Deputy President of the Council of Chiefs were automatically Senators ex officio. The final five seats in the Senate were made up of Senators directly appointed by the President.

The Zimbabwean Parliament comprises the elected House of Assembly, the Senate and the President of Zimbabwe. The list of new parliamentarians was published in an Extraordinary edition of the Zimbabwe Government Gazette on 12 May 2008.

== Overview ==
=== Convening of Parliament ===
On 19 August 2008, President Robert Mugabe announced his intention to open Parliament in the subsequent week, five months after the parliamentary election was held. Due to ongoing negotiations over the disputed election, the opposition Movement for Democratic Change – Tsvangirai party saw this as unacceptable, with MDC–T Secretary-General Tendai Biti stating that it would "be a clear repudiation of the Memorandum of Understanding, and an indication beyond reasonable doubt of ZANU–PF's unwillingness to continue to be part of the talks. In short, convening Parliament decapitates the dialogue."

Nevertheless, Parliament was convened on 25 August 2008. That morning, Mugabe appointed 11 senators, including eight of the ten seats reserved for provincial governors and three of the five special non-constituency Senate seats. Chris Mushohwe was appointed Resident Minister and Governor for Manicaland Province, Ephraim Masawi for Mashonaland Central, Aeneas Chigwedere for Mashonaland East, and Faber Chidarikire for Mashonaland West. The remaining Resident Ministers and Governors—Cain Mathema for Bulawayo, David Karimanzira for Harare, Thokozile Mathuthu for Matabeleland North, and Angeline Masuku for Matabeleland South—were reappointed to their posts. (Mugabe did not appoint governors for Midlands and Masvingo provinces at that time.) The three non-constituency senators appointed that day were Vice-President Joseph Msika, Patrick Chinamasa, and John Nkomo, who was Speaker of Parliament during the preceding parliamentary term. Mugabe was believed to have left some of the posts vacant so that they could go to the MDC in the event of a power-sharing agreement.

Despite the MDC–T's objections, the members of Parliament were sworn in on the morning of 25 August. The MDC MPs sat on the government benches and told the ZANU–PF MPs to sit on the opposition benches. Also on 25 August, two MDC–T MPs, Shuwa Mudiwa and Eliah Jembere, were arrested. Mudiwa was released later in the day and was sworn in as an MP. Wayne Bvudzijena, a police spokesman, said that the police questioned Mudiwa with regard to political violence, while Jembere was being held over rape charges. Five other MDC MPs were also wanted by the police. The MDC–T denounced the arrests as politically motivated and said that the police had entered Parliament and forcefully removed Mudiwa from the building. It also claimed that another of its MPs was targeted for arrest but that this arrest was prevented by other MDC MPs; however, according to the MDC, a third MP was arrested at his home the next day.

Mugabe opened Parliament with a speech on 26 August, expressing an optimistic outlook on resolving the political dispute—"Landmark agreements have been concluded, with every expectation that everyone will sign up"—while denouncing the West's policies toward Zimbabwe. MDC MPs heckled him during his speech; although Mugabe continued speaking and completed it, he was reportedly inaudible at times due to the volume of the heckling, "look[ed] annoyed", and spoke more loudly and quickly as a result. In a petition on the same day, the MDC condemned the convening of Parliament as a violation of the preliminary agreement between the parties regarding negotiations, described Mugabe as an "illegitimate usurper", and criticized the arrest of the MDC MPs. The state-owned newspaper The Herald strongly criticized the heckling in an editorial, describing it as "disgraceful" and "infantile", while also asserting that the MDC–T had effectively acknowledged Mugabe's legitimacy by attending Parliament and remaining there during Mugabe's speech.

=== Election of speakers ===
Parliament was convened at 10 a.m. on 25 August 2008 by Clerk of Parliament Austin Zvoma, though Mudiwa and Jembere had been arrested prior to the ceremony. Mudiwa was later released and sworn into office, but Jembere remained in police custody. In addition, the MDC announced that 15 of its members would not attend the ceremony because they were hiding from intimidation and violence.

After the members of Parliament were sworn in, elections were held that day for the leadership of both houses of Parliament. In the House of Assembly, a secret-ballot election of the Speaker pitted Lovemore Moyo (MDC–T) against Paul Temba Nyathi (MDC–M); ZANU–PF declined to field a candidate against the two, opting to back the MDC–M candidate instead. Moyo won the election with 110 votes against Nyathi's 98. The Deputy Speaker, Nomalanga Khumalo (MDC–M) was also elected. Moyo reportedly received 99 votes from MDC–T MPs, seven votes from MDC–M MPs, and four votes from ZANU–PF MPs, but the breakdown of results could not be known for certain because the vote was secret. Independent MP Jonathan Moyo also backed Nyathi.

ZANU–PF's Emmerson Mnangagwa described Moyo's election as "a truly historic event" and expressed his congratulations on behalf of Mugabe and the party. Following his election as Speaker, Moyo predicted that Parliament would henceforth be a meaningful check on the executive, which would need to "find ways of negotiating with the legislature in order to put through programs". In the Speaker election, a number of the MDC–M MPs voted against their own party's candidate for Speaker, which was considered a blow to Mugabe, because it meant that he could not rely on MDC–M MPs to vote with ZANU–PF. Thus, ZANU–PF would likely be unable to control a parliamentary majority despite the support of the MDC–M leadership.

In the Senate, where ZANU–PF held a majority, ZANU–PF candidate Edna Madzongwe was reelected President of the Senate with 58 votes. Gibson Sibanda, whose candidacy was supported by both the MDC–T and the MDC–M, received 28 votes.

=== Temporary adjournment and power-sharing agreement ===
On 24 October, it was announced that Parliament would be adjourned until 11 November due to a lack of funds from the government.

Parliament planned to meet again in October 2008, at which point it would consider proposed constitutional amendments resulting from the power-sharing agreement between ZANU–PF and the MDC, which was signed in September. As the terms of the deal were supported by all three parties, the amendments were expected to pass without difficulty. Elements of the agreement specifically relevant to Parliament included granting all three parties the right to appoint one minister who is not a Member of Parliament. These ministers would be allowed to participate in Parliament, but would not have voting rights. Additionally, the agreement provided for the appointment of nine more non-constituency senators, three from each party.

== House of Assembly ==
=== Composition of the House of Assembly ===
At the start of the Parliament, the House of Assembly was made up of 210 members, as well as the presiding officer, known as the Speaker, who is elected at the Assembly's first sitting. A Member of the House of Assembly who is elected as Speaker ceases to be a Member of the House of Assembly, and the vacant seat must be filled in accordance with the Electoral Law.

Following the signing of the Global Political Agreement between ZANU-PF, MDC-T and MDC-M, five extra seats were added to the House of Assembly under the Constitution of Zimbabwe Amendment (No. 19) Act, 2009. These additional seats comprised persons appointed to the posts of Vice-President, Prime Minister and Deputy Prime Minister and who are not already Members of Parliament, become ex officio members of the House of Assembly. Should persons so appointed be already members of Parliament, then the Party of which that person is a member or nominee had the right to nominate a non-constituency member of the relevant House.

Members
| | Elected in July 2008 | At dissolution in June 2013 | | | |
| Constituency Maps | | | | | |
| Assembly composition | | | | | |
| Party | Constituency Seats | Constituency Seats | Appointed Seats | Total Seats | Change |
|---|---|---|---|---|---|
| ZANU–PF | 99 | 90 | 1 | 91 | ▼8 |
| MDC–T | 100 | 95 | 2 | 97 | ▼3 |
| MDC-M | 10 | 7 | 1 | 8 | ▼2 |
| Independent | 1 | 0 | 0 | 0 | ▼1 |
| Total | 210 | 192 | 4 | 196 | ▼14 |
| Vacant | 0 | 18 | 1 | 19 | ▲19 |
| Speaker | 1 | 1 | | | Steady |
| Government majority | -12 | -14 | | | ▼1 |

=== Elected Constituency Members ===
210 members of the House of Assembly were elected by secret ballot from the 210 constituencies into which Zimbabwe is divided. The following members were gazetted as having won seats during the general election in March 2008.

| Constituency | Party of incumbent at previous election | Member returned | Party of incumbent after election | Notes |
Bulawayo Province
| Bulawayo Central | New constituency | Dorcas Staff Sibanda | MDC-T | |
| Bulawayo East | MDC | Thabitha Khumalo | MDC-T | |
| Bulawayo South | MDC | Edward Graham Cross | MDC-T | Reelected |
| Emakhandeni–Entumbane | New constituency | Cornelius Raphael Dube | MDC-T | Died 15 August 2009 |
| Lobengula | New constituency | Samuel Sipepa Nkomo | MDC-T | |
| Luveve | New constituency | Reggie Moyo | MDC-T | |
| Magwegwe | New constituency | Felix Magalela Sibanda | MDC-T | |
| Makokoba | MDC | Thokozani Khupe | MDC-T | |
| Nketa | New constituency | Seiso Moyo | MDC-T | |
| Nkulumane | MDC | Tamsanqa Mahlangu | MDC-T | |
| Pelandaba–Mpopoma | MDC | Samuel Sandla Khumalo | MDC-T | Elected on 27 June 2008 by-election as no constituency election took place in March poll due to a candidate dying ahead of the election. |
| Pumula | New constituency | Albert Mhlanga | MDC-T | |
Harare Province
| Budiriro | MDC | Heneri Amos Murima Dzinotyiweyi | MDC-T | |
| Chitungwiza North | New constituency | Fidelis Mhashu | MDC-T | Represented Chitungwiza for MDC in previous Parliament. |
| Chitungwiza South | New constituency | Misheck Shoko | MDC-T | |
| Dzivarasekwa | MDC | Evelyn Masaiti | MDC-T | |
| Epworth | New constituency | Eliah Jembere | MDC-T | |
| Glen Norah | MDC | Gift Dzirutwe | MDC-T | |
| Glen View North | New constituency | Fani Munengami | MDC-T | |
| Glen View South | New constituency | Paul Madzore | MDC-T | |
| Harare Central | MDC | Murisi Zwizwai | MDC-T | |
| Harare East | MDC | Tendai Laxton Biti | MDC-T | |
| Harare North | MDC | Theresa Maonei Makone | MDC-T | |
| Harare South | ZANU-PF | Magadzire Hubert Nyanhongo | ZANU-PF | Reelected |
| Harare West | New constituency | Fungayi Jessie Majome | MDC-T | |
| Hatfield | MDC | Tapiwa Mashakada | MDC-T | |
| Highfield East | New constituency | Pearson Tachiveyi Mungofa | MDC-T | |
| Highfield West | New constituency | Simon Ruwuke Hove | MDC-T | |
| Kambuzuma | MDC | Willias Madzimure | MDC-T | |
| Kuwadzana | MDC | Lucia Gladys Matibenga | MDC-T | |
| Kuwadzana East | New constituency | Nelson Chamisa | MDC-T | Represented Kuwadzana for MDC in previous Parliament. |
| Mabvuku-Tafara | New constituency | Shepherd Madamombe | MDC-T | Died 2 June 2010 |
| Mbare | MDC | Piniel Denga | MDC-T | |
| Mount Pleasant | New constituency | Jameson Zvidzai Timba | MDC-T | |
| Mufakose | MDC | Paurina Mpariwa | MDC-T | |
| Southerton | New constituency | Gift Chimanikire | MDC-T | |
| St Mary's | MDC | Marvellous Kumalo | MDC-T | |
| Sunningdale | New constituency | Margaret Matienga | MDC-T | |
| Warren Park | New constituency | Elias Mudzuri | MDC-T | |
| Zengeza East | New constituency | Alexio Leon Musundire | MDC-T | |
| Zengeza West | New constituency | Collen Cephas Gwiyo | MDC-T | |
Manicaland Province
| Buhera Central | New constituency | Tangwara Matimba | MDC-T | |
| Buhera North | ZANU-PF | William Mutomba | ZANU-PF | Reelected |
| Buhera South | ZANU-PF | Raison Nemadziva | MDC-T | |
| Buhera West | New constituency | Eric Taurai Matinenga | MDC-T | |
| Chimanimani East | New constituency | Samuel Undenge | ZANU-PF | |
| Chimanimani West | New constituency | Lynette Karenyi | MDC-T | |
| Chipinge Central | New constituency | Alice Chitima | ZANU-PF | |
| Chipinge East | New constituency | Mathias Matewu Mlambo | MDC-T | |
| Chipinge South | ZANU-PF | Meki Makuyana | MDC-T | |
| Chipinge West | New constituency | Sibonile Nyamudeza | MDC-T | |
| Dangamvura–Chikanga | New constituency | Giles Tariyafero Mutsekwa | MDC-T | |
| Headlands | New constituency | Didymus Noel Mutasa | ZANU-PF | Represented Makoni North in previous Parliament. |
| Makoni Central | New constituency | John Nyamande | MDC-T | Died 8 November 2009 |
| Makoni North | ZANU-PF | Elton Steers Mangoma | MDC-T | |
| Makoni South | New constituency | Pishai Muchauraya | MDC-T | |
| Makoni West | ZANU-PF | Webber Chinyadza | MDC-T | |
| Musikavanhu | New constituency | Chipfiwa Prosper Mutseyami | MDC-T | |
| Mutare Central | MDC | Innocent Tinashe Gonese | MDC-T | Reelected |
| Mutare North | MDC | Charles Fungayi Pemhenayi | ZANU-PF | Died 17 July 2009 |
| Mutare South | ZANU-PF | Fred Kanzama | ZANU-PF | Reelected |
| Mutare West | ZANU-PF | Shuah Mudiwa | MDC-T | |
| Mutasa Central | New constituency | Trevor Jones Lovelace Saruwaka | MDC-T | |
| Mutasa North | ZANU-PF | David Antony Chimhini | MDC-T | |
| Mutasa South | ZANU-PF | Misheck Tofamangwana Kagurabadza | MDC-T | |
| Nyanga North | New constituency | Douglas Togaraseyi Mwonzora | MDC-T | |
| Nyanga South | New constituency | Willard Manyowa Chimbetete | MDC-T | |
Mashonaland Central Province
| Bindura North | New constituency | Elliot Tapfumaneyi Manyika | ZANU-PF | Died 6 December 2008 |
| Bindura South | New constituency | Bednock Nyaude | MDC-T | |
| Guruve North | ZANU-PF | Cletus Mabaranga | ZANU-PF | Died 26 September 2008. |
| Guruve South | ZANU-PF | Edward Takaraza Chindori Chininga | ZANU-PF | |
| Mazowe Central | New constituency | Shepherd Lenard Mushonga | MDC-T | |
| Mazowe North | New constituency | Cairo Mhandu | ZANU-PF | |
| Mazowe South | New constituency | Margrate Zinyemba | ZANU-PF | |
| Mazowe West | ZANU-PF | Richard Chirongwe | ZANU-PF | |
| Mbire | New constituency | Paul Herbert Mazikana | ZANU-PF | |
| Mount Darwin East | New constituency | Betty Chikava | ZANU-PF | Died 11 January 2012 |
| Mount Darwin North | ZANU-PF | Itai Dickson Mafios | ZANU-PF | |
| Mount Darwin South | ZANU-PF | Saviour Kasukuwere | ZANU-PF | Reelected |
| Mount Darwin West | New constituency | Joice Mujuru | ZANU-PF | Represented Mount Darwin North in previous Parliament |
| Muzarabani North | New constituency | Luke Mushore | ZANU-PF | |
| Muzarabani South | New constituency | Edward Raradza | ZANU-PF | |
| Rushinga | ZANU-PF | Lazarus Dagwa Kambarami Dokora | ZANU-PF | |
| Shamva North | New constituency | Nicholas Tasunungurwa Goche | ZANU-PF | Represented Shamva in previous Parliament |
| Shamva South | New constituency | Kingstone Samuel Ziteya | ZANU-PF | Died 17 December 2011 |
Mashonaland East Province
| Chikomba Central | New constituency | Moses Jiri | MDC-T | |
| Chikomba East | New constituency | Edgar Mbwembwe | ZANU-PF | |
| Chikomba West | New constituency | Michael Chakanaka Bimha | ZANU-PF | |
| Goromonzi North | New constituency | Paddy Tendai Zhanda | ZANU-PF | |
| Goromonzi South | New constituency | Greenbate Zvanyanya Dongo | MDC-T | |
| Goromonzi West | New constituency | Biata Beatrice Nyamupinga | ZANU-PF | |
| Maramba Pfungwe | New constituency | Washington Musvaire | ZANU-PF | |
| Marondera Central | New constituency | James Iain Hamilton Kay | MDC-T | |
| Marondera East | ZANU-PF | Tracy Mutinhiri | ZANU-PF | Expelled from Party on 31 August 2011 |
| Marondera West | ZANU-PF | Ambrose Mutinhiri | ZANU-PF | |
| Mudzi North | New constituency | Newton Kachepa | ZANU-PF | |
| Mudzi South | New constituency | Eric Navaya | ZANU-PF | |
| Mudzi West | ZANU-PF | Aqualinah Katsande | ZANU-PF | |
| Murewa North | ZANU-PF | David Pagwesese Parirenyatwa | ZANU-PF | Reelected |
| Murewa South | ZANU-PF | Joel Biggie Matiza | ZANU-PF | Reelected |
| Murewa West | New constituency | Ward Nezi | MDC-T | |
| Mutoko East | New constituency | Ordo Nyakudanga | ZANU-PF | |
| Mutoko North | ZANU-PF | Mabel Memory Chinomona | ZANU-PF | |
| Mutoko South | ZANU-PF | Olivia Nyembezi Muhena | ZANU-PF | Reelected |
| Seke | ZANU-PF | Phineas Chivanze Chiota | ZANU-PF | Reelected |
| Uzumba | New constituency | Simbaneuta Mudarikwa | ZANU-PF | |
| Wedza North | New constituency | Gibson Munyeyi | ZANU-PF | |
| Wedza South | New constituency | Rosemary Goto | ZANU-PF | |
Mashonaland West Province
| Chakari | New constituency | Wurayayi Zachariah Ziyambi | ZANU-PF | Represented Sanyati in previous Parliament. |
| Chegutu East | New constituency | Webster Kotiwani Shamu | ZANU-PF | Represented Chegutu in previous Parliament. |
| Chegutu West | New constituency | Takalani Prince Matibe | MDC-T | |
| Chinhoyi | ZANU-PF | Stewart Garadhi | MDC-T | |
| Hurungwe Central | New constituency | Godfrey Beremauro | ZANU-PF | |
| Hurungwe East | ZANU-PF | Sarah Mahoka | ZANU-PF | |
| Hurungwe North | New constituency | Peter Tapera Chanetsa | ZANU-PF | |
| Hurungwe West | ZANU-PF | Tall Severino Chambati | MDC-T | |
| Kadoma Central | MDC | Editor Erimenziah Matamisa | MDC-T | Reelected |
| Kariba | ZANU-PF | Cleopas Machacha | MDC-T | |
| Magunje | New constituency | Franco Ndambakuwa | ZANU-PF | |
| Makonde | ZANU-PF | Risipa Kapesa | ZANU-PF | |
| Mhangura | New constituency | Douglas Mombeshora | ZANU-PF | |
| Mhondoro-Mubaira | New constituency | Sylvester Robert Nguni | ZANU-PF | Represented Mhondoro in previous Parliament |
| Mhondoro-Ngezi | New constituency | Bright Matonga | ZANU-PF | Represented Ngezi in previous Parliament |
| Muzvezve | New constituency | Peter Haritatos | ZANU-PF | |
| Norton | New constituency | Edward Musumbu | MDC-T | |
| Sanyati | ZANU-PF | Fungai Chaderopa | ZANU-PF | |
| Zvimba East | New constituency | Patrick Zhuwao | ZANU-PF | |
| Zvimba North | ZANU-PF | Ignatius Chombo | ZANU-PF | Reelected |
| Zvimba South | ZANU-PF | Walter Chidhakwa | ZANU-PF | |
| Zvimba West | New constituency | Nelson Tapera Crispen Samkange | ZANU-PF | |
Masvingo Province
| Bikita East | ZANU-PF | Edmore Marima | MDC-T | |
| Bikita South | New constituency | Jani Varandeni | MDC-T | |
| Bikita West | ZANU-PF | Heya Shoko | MDC-T | |
| Chiredzi East | New constituency | Abraham Sithole | ZANU-PF | |
| Chiredzi North | ZANU-PF | Ronald Ndava | ZANU-PF | |
| Chiredzi South | ZANU-PF | Ailess Baloyi | ZANU-PF | |
| Chiredzi West | New constituency | Moses Mare | MDC-T | |
| Chivi Central | New constituency | Paul Munyaradzi Mangwana | ZANU-PF | |
| Chivi North | ZANU-PF | Tranos Huruba | ZANU-PF | |
| Chivi South | ZANU-PF | Ivene Dzingirayi | ZANU-PF | |
| Gutu Central | New constituency | Oliver Chirume | MDC-T | |
| Gutu East | New constituency | Ransome Makamure | MDC-T | |
| Gutu North | ZANU-PF | Edmore Hamandishe Maramwidze | MDC-T | |
| Gutu South | ZANU-PF | Eliphas Mukonoweshuro | MDC-T | Died 5 August 2011 |
| Gutu West | New constituency | Noel Tarirai Mandebvu | ZANU-PF | |
| Masvingo Central | MDC | Jeffryson Chitando | MDC-T | |
| Masvingo North | ZANU-PF | Isack Stanisalaus Mudenge | ZANU-PF | Reelected. Died 4 October 2012. |
| Masvingo South | ZANU-PF | Walter Mzembi | ZANU-PF | Reelected |
| Masvingo Urban | New constituency | Tongai Matutu | MDC-T | |
| Masvingo West | New constituency | Mharadza Tachiona | MDC-T | |
| Mwenezi East | New constituency | Kudakwashe Tshuma Bhasikiti | ZANU-PF | |
| Mwenezi West | New constituency | Neddie Pilot Sacks Masukume | ZANU-PF | Died late 2011. |
| Zaka Central | New constituency | Harison Mudzuri | MDC-T | |
| Zaka East | ZANU-PF | Samson Tapera Mukanduri | ZANU-PF | |
| Zaka North | New constituency | Ernest Mudavanhu | MDC-T | |
| Zaka West | ZANU-PF | Festus Dumbu | MDC-T | |
Matabeleland North Province
| Binga North | New constituency | Patrick Nene Sibanda | MDC-T | |
| Binga South | New constituency | Joel Gabuza Gabbuza | MDC-T | Represented Binga in previous Parliament |
| Bubi | New constituency | Clifford Cameroon Sibanda | ZANU-PF | |
| Hwange Central | New constituency | Brian Tshuma | MDC-T | |
| Hwange East | MDC | Tose Wesley Sansole | MDC-T | |
| Hwange West | MDC | Gift Mabhena | MDC-T | |
| Lupane East | New constituency | Njabuliso Mguni | MDC | Expelled from Party on 22 July 2009. |
| Lupane West | New constituency | Martin Khumalo | ZANU-PF | |
| Nkayi North | New constituency | Sithembiso Nyoni | ZANU-PF | |
| Nkayi South | New constituency | Abedinico Bhebhe | MDC | Represented Nkayi in previous Parliament. Expelled from Party on 22 July 2009. |
| Tsholotsho North | New constituency | Jonathan Nathaniel Moyo | Independent | Readmitted to ZANU-PF on 2 October 2009 |
| Tsholotsho South | New constituency | Maxwell Dube | MDC | |
| Umguza | New constituency | Obert Moses Mpofu | ZANU-PF | Represented Bubi-Umguza in previous Parliament |
Matabeleland South Province
| Beitbridge East | New constituency | Kembo Campbell Mohadi | ZANU-PF | Represented Beitbridge in previous Parliament |
| Beitbridge West | New constituency | Metrine Mudau | ZANU-PF | |
| Bulilima East | New constituency | Norman Mpofu | MDC | Expelled from Party on 22 July 2009. |
| Bulilima West | New constituency | Moses Ndlovu | MDC | |
| Gwanda Central | New constituency | Patrick Dube | MDC | |
| Gwanda North | New constituency | Thandeko Mnkhandhla | MDC | |
| Gwanda South | New constituency | Orders Shakespeare Mlilo | ZANU-PF | |
| Insiza North | New constituency | Andrew Langa | ZANU-PF | Represented Insiza in previous Parliament |
| Insiza South | New constituency | Siyabonga Ncube | MDC | |
| Mangwe | MDC | Mkhosi Edward Tshotsho Moyo | MDC | Reelected |
| Matobo North | New constituency | Lovemore Moyo | MDC-T | Elected Speaker on 25 August 2008. Seat automatically vacated. |
| Matobo South | New constituency | Gabriel Ndebele | MDC-T | |
| Umzingwane | MDC | Nomalanga Mzilikazi Khumalo | MDC | Reelected |
Midlands Province
| Chirumanzu | ZANU-PF | Phares Hakuna Maramba | ZANU-PF | |
| Chirumanzu Zibagwe | New constituency | Emmerson Mnangagwa | ZANU-PF | |
| Chiwundura | New constituency | Kizito Chivamba | ZANU-PF | |
| Gokwe Central | New constituency | Dorothy Mhangami | ZANU-PF | |
| Gokwe Chireya | ZANU-PF | Cephas Sindi | ZANU-PF | |
| Gokwe Gumunyu | New constituency | Ephrem Mushoriwa | ZANU-PF | Died before Parliament first sat 2008 |
| Gokwe Kabuyuni | New constituency | Costin Muguti | MDC-T | |
| Gokwe Kana | ZANU-PF | Busy Ngwenya | ZANU-PF | |
| Gokwe Mapfungautsi | New constituency | Lovemore Mupukuta | ZANU-PF | |
| Gokwe Nembudziya | ZANU-PF | Flora Buka | ZANU-PF | Reelected |
| Gokwe Sengwa | ZANU-PF | Shaddy Sai | ZANU-PF | |
| Gokwe Sasame | New constituency | Darcus Maposhere | ZANU-PF | |
| Gweru Urban | MDC | Rodrick Rutsvara | MDC-T | |
| Kwekwe Central | MDC | Blessing Chebundo | MDC-T | |
| Mberengwa East | ZANU-PF | Makhosini Hlongwane | ZANU-PF | |
| Mberengwa North | New constituency | Jabulani Mangena | ZANU-PF | Died 30 November 2012. |
| Mberengwa South | New constituency | Ellina Shirichena | ZANU-PF | |
| Mberengwa West | ZANU-PF | Joram Macdonald Gumbo | ZANU-PF | Reelected |
| Mbizo | New constituency | Settlement Chikwinya | MDC-T | |
| Mkoba | MDC | Amos Chibaya | MDC-T | Reelected |
| Redcliff | New constituency | Isheunesu Muza | ZANU-PF | |
| Shurugwi North | New constituency | Chenaimoyo Nhema | ZANU-PF | Represented Shurugwi in previous Parliament |
| Shurugwi South | New constituency | Anastancia Ndhlovu | ZANU-PF | |
| Silobela | MDC | Anadi Sululi | MDC-T | |
| Vungu | New constituency | Josephat Madubeko | ZANU-PF | |
| Zhombe | ZANU-PF | Rodger Tazviona | MDC-T | |
| Zvishavane Ngezi | New constituency | Obert Matshalaga | ZANU-PF | |
| Zvishavane Runde | New constituency | Lawrence David Mavima | ZANU-PF | |

=== Members appointed in accord with the Constitution of Zimbabwe Amendment (No. 19) Act, 2009 ===
Following the signing of the Global Political Agreement between ZANU-PF, MDC-T and MDC-M, five extra seats were added to the House of Assembly under the Constitution of Zimbabwe Amendment (No. 19) Act, 2009. These additional seats comprised persons appointed to the posts of Vice-President, Prime Minister and Deputy Prime Minister and who are not already Members of Parliament, become ex officio members of the House of Assembly. Should persons so appointed be already members of Parliament, then the Party of which that person is a member or nominee had the right to nominate a non-constituency member of the relevant House.

| Post | Party of member | Member | Notes |
|---|---|---|---|
| Non-Constituency Seat | ZANU-PF | Oppah Muchinguri | Nominated in lieu of First Vice-President Joice Mujuru, who already had a seat representing Mount Darwin West. Sworn into House of Assembly on 29 March 2011. |
| Second Vice-President | ZANU-PF | Joseph Msika | Died 4 August 2009 |
| Prime Minister | MDC-T | Morgan Tsvangirai | |
| Non-Constituency Seat | MDC-T | Gorden Moyo | Nominated in lieu of Deputy Prime Minister Thokozani Khupe, who already had a seat representing Makokoba |
| Deputy Prime Minister | MDC-M | Arthur Mutambara | |
Replacement Members
| Second Vice-President | ZANU-PF | John Nkomo | Vice-President from 13 December 2009. Sworn into House of Assembly on 29 March 2011, transferring from Senate. Died 17 January 2013. |

== Senate ==
=== Composition of the Senate ===
The Senate is made up of 93 members, as well as the presiding officer, known as the President of the Senate, who is elected at the Senate's first sitting. A Senator who is elected as President of the Senate ceases to be a Senator, and the vacant seat must be filled in accordance with the Electoral Law.

Following the signing of the Global Political Agreement between ZANU-PF, MDC-T and MDC-M, six extra seats were added to the Senate under the Constitution of Zimbabwe Amendment (No. 19) Act, 2009. These additional seats were to balance the five existing seats allocated to ZANU-PF members appointed by the President and would be distributed so that four would be nominated by MDC-T and two by MDC-M.

Members
| | At opening of Parliament in August 2008 | | | | At dissolution in June 2013 | | | | |
| Constituency Maps | | | | | | | | | |
| Senate composition | | | | | | | | | |
| Affiliation | Elected Members | Provincial Governors | Presidential Appointees | Total | Elected Members | Provincial Governors | Presidential Appointees | Total | Change |
|---|---|---|---|---|---|---|---|---|---|
| ZANU–PF | 30 | 10 | 5 | 45 | 24 | 9 | 5 | 38 | ▼7 |
| MDC–T | 24 | 0 | 0 | 24 | 19 | 0 | 4 | 23 | ▼1 |
| MDC-M | 6 | 0 | 0 | 6 | 6 | 0 | 2 | 8 | ▲2 |
| Chiefs | 18 | —N/a | —N/a | 18 | 16 | —N/a | —N/a | 16 | ▼2 |
| Total | 78 | 10 | 5 | 93 | 65 | 9 | 11 | 85 | ▼8 |
| Vacant | 0 | 0 | 0 | 0 | 13 | 1 | 0 | 14 | ▲14 |
| President of the Senate | 1 | | | | 1 | | | | Steady |

=== Elected Constituency Senators ===
60 members of the Senate were elected by secret ballot from the 60 senatorial constituencies into which Zimbabwe is divided. The following members were gazetted as having won seats during the general election in March 2008.

| Constituency | Party of incumbent at previous election | Member returned | Party of incumbent after election | Notes |
Bulawayo Province
| Emganwini | New constituency | Siphiwe Ncube | MDC-T | |
| Gwabalanda | New constituency | Agnes Sibanda | MDC-T | |
| Khumalo | New constituency | David Coltart | MDC | |
| Mabuthweni | New constituency | Gladys Tambudzo Dube | MDC-T | Died 26 December 2011 |
| Masotsha Ndlovu | New constituency | Enna Chitsa | MDC-T | Died 2 March 2012 |
| Mzilikazi | New constituency | Matson Mpofu Hlalo | MDC-T | |
Harare Province
| Chikomo | New constituency | Morgan Femai | MDC-T | |
| Chisipite | New constituency | Obert Chaurura Gutu | MDC-T | |
| Chitungwiza | ZANU-PF | James Makore | MDC-T | |
| Chizhanje | New constituency | Sekai Masikana Holland | MDC-T | |
| Hwata | New constituency | Rorana Muchihwa | MDC-T | |
| Mvurachena | New constituency | Cephas Makuyana | MDC-T | |
Manicaland Province
| Buhera | New constituency | Tsungirirai Samuel Muzerengwa | MDC-T | |
| Chimanimani | New constituency | Monica Mutsvangwa | ZANU-PF | |
| Chipinge | New constituency | Josiah Mukayi Rimbi | MDC-T | Died 24 September 2012 |
| Makoni | New constituency | Stanley Urayayi Sakupwanya | ZANU-PF | |
| Mutare | ZANU-PF | Keresensia Chabuka | MDC-T | |
| Mutasa-Nyanga | New constituency | Patrick Chitaka | MDC-T | |
Mashonaland Central Province
| Bindura-Shamva | ZANU-PF | Misheck Chando | ZANU-PF | Died 23 October 2009 |
| Guruve-Mbire | New constituency | Gethide Chibagu | ZANU-PF | |
| Mazowe | ZANU-PF | Agnes Angelina Dete | ZANU-PF | Reelected |
| Mount Darwin | New constituency | Alice Chimbudzi | ZANU-PF | Represented Mount Darwin-Muzarabani in previous Parliament |
| Muzarabani | New constituency | Jenia Manyeruke | ZANU-PF | |
| Rushinga | New constituency | Damian Mumvuri | ZANU-PF | |
Mashonaland East Province
| Chikomba-Seke | New constituency | Gladys Mabhiza | ZANU-PF | |
| Marondera-Wedza | New constituency | Sydney Tigere Sekeramayi | ZANU-PF | |
| Goromonzi | New constituency | Herbert Muchemwa Murerwa | ZANU-PF | |
| Murewa | New constituency | Tendayi Makunde | ZANU-PF | |
| Mutoko | ZANU-PF | Edmond Jacob | ZANU-PF | Reelected |
| Uzumba Maramba Pfungwe-Mudzi | New constituency | Oriah Kabayanjiri | ZANU-PF | |
Mashonaland West Province
| Chegutu | New constituency | Edna Madzongwe | ZANU-PF | Elected President of the Senate on 25 August 2008; seat automatically declared vacant. |
| Hurungwe | New constituency | Reuben Marumahoko | ZANU-PF | |
| Kadoma | New constituency | Chiratidzo Gava | ZANU-PF | Died 30 July 2010 |
| Kariba | New constituency | John Masaba | MDC-T | |
| Makonde | New constituency | Virginia Katyamaenza | ZANU-PF | |
| Zvimba | ZANU-PF | Virginia Muchenje | ZANU-PF | Reelected |
Masvingo Province
| Bikita | New constituency | Kokerai Rugara | MDC-T | |
| Chiredzi | New constituency | Titus Hatlani Maluleke | ZANU-PF | Appointed Provincial Governor of Masvingo on 25 August 2008. Seat automatically vacated. |
| Gutu | ZANU-PF | Empire Kufachikati Makamure | MDC-T | |
| Masvingo | ZANU-PF | Minah Imelda Nachi Mandaba | ZANU-PF | |
| Mwenezi-Chivi | ZANU-PF | Josaya Dunira Hungwe | ZANU-PF | |
| Zaka | New constituency | Misheck Marava | MDC-T | |
Matabeleland North Province
| Binga | MDC | Herbert Madolo Sinampande | MDC-T | |
| Bubi-Umguza | ZANU-PF | Lot Mbambo | ZANU-PF | |
| Hwange | New constituency | Jabulani Ndlovu | MDC-T | Died 1 December 2010 |
| Lupane | New constituency | Dalumuzi Khumalo | MDC | |
| Nkayi | New constituency | Rabson Robert Makhula | MDC | |
| Tsholotsho | New constituency | Believe Gaule | MDC | |
Matabeleland South Province
| Beitbridge | ZANU-PF | Tambudzani Budagi Mohadi | ZANU-PF | Reelected |
| Bulilima-Mangwe | ZANU-PF | Lutho Addington Tapela | MDC | |
| Gwanda | ZANU-PF | Japhet Dube | ZANU-PF | |
| Insiza | ZANU-PF | Naison Ndlovu | ZANU-PF | Reelected. Elected Deputy President of the Senate on 25 August 2008. |
| Matobo | New constituency | Sithembile Mlotshwa | MDC-T | |
| Umzingwane | New constituency | Kembo Dube | MDC | |
Midlands Province
| Gweru-Chirumanzu | New constituency | Patrick Kombayi | MDC-T | Died 20 June 2009 |
| Gokwe North | New constituency | Tariro Mtingwende | ZANU-PF | |
| Gokwe South | New constituency | Jaison Max Kokerai Machaya | ZANU-PF | Appointed Provincial Governor of Midlands on 25 August 2008. Seat automatically vacated. |
| Kwekwe | New constituency | Henry Madzorera | MDC-T | |
| Mberengwa | New constituency | Richard Hove | ZANU-PF | Represented Mberengwa-Zvishavane in previous Parliament. Died 21 August 2009. |
| Shurugwi-Zvishavane | New constituency | Simbarashe Mumbengegwi | ZANU-PF | |

=== Provincial Governors ===
Chapter 5, Part 2, §34(b) of the Constitution of Zimbabwe reserved 10 seats in the Senate for Provincial Governors, one from each of the ten Provinces, appointed by the President.

The appointment of Provincial Governors emerged as a significant source of contention, underscoring the asymmetrical power dynamics within the power-sharing framework established by the GPA. Under the provisions of the Constitution of Zimbabwe (as amended), President Robert Mugabe held the exclusive authority to appoint the ten Provincial Governors — one for each of the ten provinces — who served ex officio as non-constituency members of the Senate, thereby affording the executive considerable influence over upper-house proceedings despite the opposition's parliamentary gains. Mugabe, exercising this prerogative with minimal consultation, systematically appointed loyalists from ZANU–PF to these positions, often extending or renewing incumbents from prior terms and installing new figures aligned with the party's hardline faction, in a manner that contravened the GPA's stipulation for inter-party consensus on senior appointments to promote inclusivity and reconciliation. Notable appointments included the re-endorsement of David Karimanzira for Harare, a veteran ZANU–PF mobiliser with roots in the liberation struggle; Christopher Mushohwe for Manicaland, known for his role in party provincial structures; Cain Mathema for Bulawayo, a long-standing ideologue whose tenure evoked historical ethnic sensitivities.

In response to Mugabe's unilateralism, the MDC–T and MDC–M advanced their own slates of nominees for the gubernatorial posts, framing these as reflective of their electoral mandate and essential for equitable provincial administration in a context of economic collapse and service delivery failures. In March 2011, following the death of ZANU–PF's David Karimanzira, the Harare provincial governorship fell vacant. Under the GPA, the MDC formations were entitled to five of the ten governorships, and MDC–T promptly nominated James Makore – a former ZANU–PF member turned trade-unionist, long-serving aide to Prime Minister Morgan Tsvangirai, and the sitting MDC–T senator for Chitungwiza – to fill the Harare post. Despite repeated demands from MDC–T spokesman Douglas Mwonzora that Makore be sworn in immediately, Mugabe refused, insisting that governors remained a presidential prerogative and linking any MDC appointments to the prior removal of targeted Western sanctions. Makore was never installed; the post remained vacant until the end of the GNU in 2013. Nominees for other provinces included Lucia Matibenga for Masvingo, Julius Magaramombe for Manicaland, Seiso Moyo for Bulawayo, and Tose Sansole for Matabeleland North. Throughout the Parliament, they remained notionally reserved but unsworn—exacerbating perceptions of ZANU–PF's deliberate sabotage of devolutionary reforms amid Harare's mounting sanitation crises and infrastructural decay.

| Party | Province | Provincial Governor | Notes |
|---|---|---|---|
| ZANU-PF | Bulawayo | Cain Mathema | |
| ZANU-PF | Harare | David Ishemunyoro Karimanzira | Died 24 March 2011 |
| ZANU-PF | Manicaland | Christopher Mushohwe | |
| ZANU-PF | Mashonaland Central | Martin Dinha | |
| ZANU-PF | Mashonaland East | Aeneas Chigwedere | |
| ZANU-PF | Mashonaland West | Faber Chidarikire | |
| ZANU-PF | Masvingo | Titus Maluleke | |
| ZANU-PF | Matabeleland North | Thokozile Mathuthu | |
| ZANU-PF | Matabeleland South | Angeline Masuku | |
| ZANU-PF | Midlands | Jaison Machaya | |

=== Chiefs' seats ===
Chapter 5, Part 2, §34(d) and (d) of the Constitution of Zimbabwe reserved 16 seats in the Senate for Chiefs, of whom two are elected by the provincial assembly of Chiefs from each of the provinces, other than the metropolitan provinces, and two for the President and Deputy President of the National Council of Chiefs.

| Elected by Provincial Assembly of Chiefs for | Traditional Chief's Name | Name of Chief | Notes |
|---|---|---|---|
| President of the Council of Chiefs (ex officio) | | Fortune Charumbira | |
| Deputy President of the Council of Chiefs (ex officio) | | Lucas Mtshane Khumalo | |
| Manicaland | Chiduku | Rivai Mbaimbai | |
| Manicaland | Chimombe | George Chimombe | Died 26 January 2011. |
| Mashonaland Central | Chisunga | Daster Chisunga | |
| Mashonaland Central | Nembire | Clemence Nyabvunzi | |
| Mashonaland East | Musarurwa | Enos Masakwa | |
| Mashonaland East | Nyamukoho | Samson Katsande | |
| Mashonaland West | Dandawa | Try Manyepa | |
| Mashonaland West | Nebiri | Wilson Nebiri | |
| Masvingo | Chitanga | Felani Chauke | |
| Masvingo | Mabika | J.T. | |
| Matabeleland North | Gampu | Ashel Gampu Sithole | |
| Matabeleland North | Shana | Zondani Jonah Neluswi | |
| Matabeleland South | Bidi | Bidi Ndiweni | Died 2009 |
| Matabeleland South | Masendu | Siandalizwe Dube | |
| Midlands | Ngungumbane | Zama Nthua Mkwananzi | |
| Midlands | Ntabeni | Milton Ntabeni | |

=== Presidential appointees ===
Chapter 5, Part 2, §34(e) of the Constitution of Zimbabwe reserved 5 seats in the Senate for members directly appointed by the President of Zimbabwe.

| Party of member | Appointee | Other role(s) | Notes |
|---|---|---|---|
| ZANU-PF | Joseph Msika | Second Vice-President of Zimbabwe | Appointed 25 August 2008. Died 4 August 2009. |
| ZANU-PF | John Landa Nkomo | From 13 December 2009 Second Vice-President of Zimbabwe | Appointed 25 August 2008. Transferred to House of Assembly on 29 March 2011. |
| ZANU-PF | Patrick Chinamasa | Minister of Justice and Legal Affairs | Appointed 25 August 2008 |
| ZANU-PF | Joseph Made | Minister of Agriculture, Mechanisation and Irrigation Development | Appointed 4 November 2008 |
| ZANU-PF | Aguy Georgias | Deputy Minister of Public Works | Sworn in April 2009 |
Replacement Appointees
| ZANU-PF | Rugare Gumbo | | Sworn in 29 March 2011. Replacing Joseph Msika. |
| ZANU-PF | Simon Khaya Moyo | | Sworn in 31 March 2011. Unsuccessfully bid to become Speaker of the House of Assembly. Replacing John Nkomo. |

=== Senators appointed in accord with the Constitution of Zimbabwe Amendment (No. 19) Act, 2009 ===
Following the signing of the Global Political Agreement between ZANU-PF, MDC-T and MDC-M, six extra seats were added to the Senate under the Constitution of Zimbabwe Amendment (No. 19) Act, 2009. These additional seats were to balance the five existing seats allocated to ZANU-PF members appointed by the President and would be distributed so that four would be nominated by MDC-T and two by MDC-M.

| Party of member | Member | Notes |
|---|---|---|
| MDC-T | Tichaona Mudzingwa | Deputy Minister of Transport and Infrastructural Development. Died 10 April 2009. |
| MDC-T | Sesel Zvidzai | Deputy Minister of Local Government and Urban Development |
| MDC-T | Roy Bennett | Designated Deputy Minister of Agriculture by Prime Minister Morgan Tsvangirai but President Robert Mugabe refused to swear him into ministerial office. Sworn in as Senator, however. |
| MDC-T | Morgan Komichi | From 28 November 2012 Deputy Minister of Transport and Infrastructural Development |
| MDC-M | Welshman Ncube | Minister of Industry and Commerce |
| MDC-M | Priscilla Misihairabwi-Mushonga | Minister of Regional Integration and International Cooperation |
Replacement Appointees
| MDC-T | Sibusisiwe Masara | Sworn in 29 November 2012, replacing Tichaona Mudzingwa. |

== By-elections, replacements and recalls ==
Under the terms of the GPA, the principal parties of ZANU–PF, MDC–T, MDC–M reached an informal understanding to refrain from contesting parliamentary seats against one another during the lifespan of the Parliament, thereby preserving the fragile balance of power within the Government of National Unity. This arrangement, while aimed at averting potential flashpoints of electoral violence akin to those that marred the 2008 polls, effectively led to the systematic postponement and de facto abolition of by-elections to fill vacancies in the House of Assembly arising from deaths, resignations, or disqualifications between 2009 and 2013. The Zimbabwe Electoral Commission (ZEC), tasked with overseeing electoral processes, cited resource constraints, logistical challenges, and the overarching need for political stability as justifications for these deferrals, though critics contended that the decisions were politically motivated to shield the coalition's equilibrium from disruption. By the end of 2012, 18 Assembly seats remained vacant. These gaps eroded parliamentary representation for affected districts, particularly in urban opposition strongholds, exacerbating perceptions of democratic deficit.

The deferments ignited fierce controversies, with MDC formations accusing ZANU–PF of exploiting the GPA's ambiguities to entrench its influence and suppress opposition gains in potential by-elections. MDC–T spokesperson Douglas Mwonzora decried the policy as "a deliberate strangulation of democracy," arguing that it contravened section 67 of the Constitution (as amended in 2009), which mandated the filling of vacancies within six months to ensure "regular, fair, and reliable elections." ZANU–PF countered that the GPA's spirit prioritised national healing over "needless politicking," with spokesperson Rugare Gumbo asserting in 2011 that by-elections risked reigniting the "anarchy of 2008," including the deaths of over 200 supporters and displacement of 5,000 families. Civil society organisations, including the Zimbabwe Election Support Network (ZESN), amplified these debates, reporting in their 2012 annual review that the absences distorted legislative oversight, particularly on GNU-mandated reforms like security sector alignment, where opposition voices were underrepresented. International observers, such as the European Union, echoed these concerns, linking the deferrals to broader GPA implementation failures, including stalled media liberalisation and security force partisanship, which Human Rights Watch documented as fostering a "climate of fear" that deterred voter participation in any hypothetical contests.

Judicial interventions sought to compel the ZEC to honour constitutional timelines, yielding mixed outcomes amid allegations of judicial capture. In a landmark 2010 High Court application, MDC–T MP Nelson Chamisa and others petitioned for by-elections in three vacant Harare seats, invoking section 39 of the Electoral Act [Chapter 2:13] and arguing that deferrals violated citizens' rights to representation under the African Charter on Democracy, Elections and Governance, ratified by Zimbabwe in 2009. Justice Tendai Uchena dismissed the suit in Chamisa v. Zimbabwe Electoral Commission (HC 4567/10), ruling that GPA-mediated consensus superseded statutory deadlines, a decision critics lambasted as "executive overreach" given Uchena's prior ZANU–PF affiliations. An appeal to the Supreme Court in 2011 fared no better; Chief Justice Luke Chidyausiku upheld the deferral in a 2–1 split, with Justice Paddington Garwe dissenting on grounds that "electoral moratoriums undermine the rule of law," but the majority deferred to the GPA's "stabilising intent." A subsequent 2012 challenge by civic group Crisis in Zimbabwe Coalition (CiZic) in the High Court (HC 8921/12) sought declaratory relief against ZEC's "indefinite postponements," but Justice Charles Hungwe ruled the matter moot post-GPA roadmap announcements, prompting CiZic to decry the judiciary's "complicity in electoral sabotage." These rulings, observers noted, reflected ZANU–PF's leverage over judicial appointments, as per the GPA's unfulfilled security sector reforms, and contributed to SADC's tepid 2012 summit communiqué urging "expeditious vacancy fillings" without enforceable timelines. By the GNU's dissolution in July 2013, the deferrals had entrenched a de facto electoral vacuum, fuelling MDC–T's boycott threats and underscoring the coalition's prioritisation of stasis over democratic renewal.

=== Constituency vacancies ===
| Constituency | Province | Date of vacancy | Party of incumbent before vacancy | Outgoing member | Reason for vacancy |
|---|---|---|---|---|---|
| Gokwe Gumunyu | MID | Between the election in March and the first sitting of Parliament in August 2008 | ZANU-PF | Ephrem Mushoriwa | Death of member |
| Matobo North | MBS | 25 August 2008 | MDC-T | Lovemore Moyo | Elected Speaker |
| Guruve North | MSC | 26 September 2008 | ZANU-PF | Cletus Mabaranga | Death of member |
| Bindura North | MSC | 6 December 2008 | ZANU-PF | Elliot Tapfumaneyi Manyika | Death of member |
| Mutare North | MCL | 17 July 2009 | ZANU-PF | Charles Fungayi Pemhenayi | Death of member |
| Lupane East | MBN | 22 July 2009 | MDC | Njabuliso Mguni | Member expelled from Party |
| Nkayi South | MBN | 22 July 2009 | MDC | Abedinico Bhebhe | Member expelled from Party |
| Bulilima East | MBS | 22 July 2009 | MDC | Norman Mpofu | Member expelled from Party |
| Emakhandeni–Entumbane | BYO | 15 August 2009 | MDC-T | Cornelius Raphael Dube | Elected Speaker |
| Makoni Central | MCL | 8 November 2009 | MDC-T | John Nyamande | Death of member |
| Mabvuku-Tafara | HRE | 2 June 2010 | MDC-T | Shepherd Madamombe | Death of member |
| Gutu South | MVG | 5 August 2011 | MDC-T | Eliphas Mukonoweshuro | Death of member |
| Marondera East | MSE | 31 August 2011 | ZANU-PF | Tracy Mutinhiri | Member expelled from Party |
| Shamva South | MSC | 17 December 2011 | ZANU-PF | Kingstone Samuel Ziteya | Death of member |
| Mwenezi West | MVG | Late 2011 | ZANU-PF | Neddie Pilot Sacks Masukume | Death of member |
| Mount Darwin East | MSC | 11 January 2012 | ZANU-PF | Betty Chikava | Death of member |
| Masvingo North | MVG | 4 October 2012 | ZANU-PF | Isack Stanisalaus Mudenge | Death of member |
| Mberengwa North | MID | 30 November 2012 | ZANU-PF | Jabulani Mangena | Death of member |

=== Senate vacancies ===
| Constituency | Province | Date of vacancy | Party of incumbent before vacancy | Outgoing member | Reason for vacancy |
|---|---|---|---|---|---|
| Chegutu | MSW | 25 August 2008 | ZANU-PF | Edna Madzongwe | Member elected President of the Senate |
| Chiredzi | MVG | 25 August 2008 | ZANU-PF | Titus Hatlani Maluleke | Member appointed Provincial Governor of Masvingo |
| Gokwe South | MID | 25 August 2008 | ZANU-PF | Jaison Max Kokerai Machaya | Member appointed Provincial Governor of Midlands |
| Gweru-Chirumanzu | MID | 20 June 2009 | MDC-T | Patrick Kombayi | Death of member |
| Bindura-Shamva | MSC | 23 October 2009 | ZANU-PF | Misheck Chando | Death of member |
| Mberengwa | MID | 21 August 2009 | ZANU-PF | Richard Hove | Death of member |
| Chief | MBS | 2009 | Bidi | Bidi Ndiweni | Death of member |
| Kadoma | MSW | 30 July 2010 | ZANU-PF | Chiratidzo Gava | Death of member |
| Hwange | MBN | 1 December 2010 | MDC-T | Jabulani Ndlovu | Death of member |
| Chief | MCL | 26 January 2011 | Chimombe | George Chimombe | Death of member |
| Provincial Governor of Harare | HRE | 24 March 2011 | ZANU-PF | David Ishemunyoro Karimanzira | Death of member |
| Mabuthweni | BYO | 26 December 2011 | MDC-T | Gladys Tambudzo Dube | Death of member |
| Masotsha Ndlovu | BYO | 2 March 2012 | MDC-T | Enna Chitsa | Death of member |
| Chipinge | MCL | 24 September 2012 | MDC-T | Josiah Mukayi Rimbi | Death of member |
