= Zimbabwe Cabinet of 2008 =

The Zimbabwe Cabinet of 2008 was a cabinet appointed by Robert Mugabe. It was initially dissolved before the March 2008 general elections, but later reconstituted. The cabinet was the first one since Zimbabwe's independence to have worked with the ZANU-PF, Mugabe's party, not winning the majority of votes. Despite that, all ministers were provided by the ZANU-PF.

Portfolio	Minister
President	Robert Gabriel Mugabe MP
Vice President	Joseph Msika MP
Vice President	Joyce Teurai Ropa Mujuru MP
Minister of State for National Security Lands, Land Reform and Resettlement in the President's Office	Didymus Noel Edwin Mutasa MP
Minister without Portfolio	Elliot Tapfumaneyi Manyika MP
Minister of Public Service, Labour and Social Welfare	Nicholas Tasunungurwa Goche MP
Minister of Rural Housing and Social Amenities	Emmerson Dambudzo Mnangagwa MP
Minister of Women Affairs, Gender and Community Development	Opa Chamu Zvipange Muchinguri MP
Minister of Defence	Dr Sydney Tigere Sekeramayi MP
Minister of State for Indigenisation and Empowerment	Samuel Mumbengegwi MP
Minister of Science and Technology Development	Olivia Nyembezi Muchena MP
Minister of Economic Development	Aleck Rugare Ngidi Gumbo MP
Minister of Higher and Tertiary Education	Dr Isack Stan Gorerazvo Mudenge MP
Minister of Industry and International Trade	Obert Moses Mpofu MP
Minister of Home Affairs	Kembo Dugish Campbell Mohadi MP
Minister of Finance	Samuel Mumbengegwi
Minister of Health and Child Welfare	Dr David Pagwese Parirenyatwa MP
Minister of Small and Medium Enterprises Development	Sithembiso Gile Gladys Nyoni MP
Minister of Local Government, Public Works and Urban Development	Dr Ignatious Morgan Chombo MP
Minister of Justice, Legal and Parliamentary Affairs	Patrick Antony Chinamasa MP
Minister of State for Public and Interactive Affairs	Chenhanho Chakezha Chimutengwende MP
Minister of Agriculture	Rugare Gumbo MP
Minister of Education Sport and Culture	Aeneas Chigwedere MP
Minister of Environment and Tourism	Francis Dunstan Chenayimoyo Nhema MP
Minister of Transport and Communications	Christopher Chindeti Mushohwe MP
Minister of Youth Development and Medium Enterprises Development	Ambrose Mutinhiri MP
Minister of Mines and Mining Development	Amos Bernard Midzi MP
Minister of State for State Enterprises, Anti-Monopolies and Anti Corruption	
Minister of State for Policy Implementation	Webster Kotiwani Shamu MP
Minister of State for Special Affairs Responsible for Land and Resettlement Programme	Flora Buka MP
Minister of Energy and Power Development	Michael Rueben Nyambuya MP
Minister of Foreign Affairs	Simbarashe Simbanenduku Mumbengegwi MP
Minister of Information and Publicity	Sikhanyiso Ndlovu MP
Minister of State Water Resources and Infrastructural Development	Munacho T. A. Mutezo MP
Provincial Governor of Mashonaland East	Ray Joseph Kaukonde MP
Provincial Governor of Mashonaland West	Nelson Tapera Chrispen Samkange MP
Provincial Governor of Mashonaland Central	Ephraim Sango Masawi MP
Provincial Governor of Masvingo	Willard Chiwewe MP
Provincial Governor of Matabeleland North	Thokozile Mathuthu MP
Provincial Governor of Matabeleland South	Angeline Masuku MP
Provincial Governor of Manicaland	Tineyi Chigudu MP
Provincial Governor of Midlands	Cephas Msipa MP
Provincial Governor of Harare	David Ishemunyoro Godi Karimanzira MP
Provincial Governor of Bulawayo	Cain Ginyilitshe Ndabazekhaya Mathema MP
