= Zimbabwe Temporary Cabinet of 2009 =

Portfolio	Minister
President	Robert Gabriel Mugabe MP
Vice President	Joseph Msika MP
Vice President	Joyce Teurai Ropa Mujuru MP
Minister of State for National Security Lands, Land Reform and Resettlement in the President's Office	Didymus Noel Edwin Mutasa MP
Minister without Portfolio	Elliot Tapfumaneyi Manyika MP
Minister of Public Service, Labour and Social Welfare	Nicholas Tasunungurwa Goche MP
Minister of Rural Housing and Social Amenities	Emmerson Dambudzo Mnangagwa MP
Minister of Women Affairs, Gender and Community Development	Sithembiso Nyoni MP (Acting)
Minister of Defence	Dr Sydney Tigere Sekeramayi MP
Minister of State for Indigenisation and Empowerment	SenatorSamuel Mumbengegwi
Minister of Science and Technology Development	Olivia Nyembezi Muchena MP
Minister of Economic Development	Aleck Rugare.Ngidi Gumbo MP
Minister of Higher and Tertiary Education	Dr Isack Stan Gorerazvo Mudenge MP
Minister of Industry and International Trade	Obert Moses Mpofu MP
Minister of Home Affairs	Kembo Dugish Campbell Mohadi MP
Minister of Finance	Sen Patrick Chinamasa (Acting)
Minister of Health and Child Welfare	Dr David Pagwese Parirenyatwa MP
Minister of Small and Medium Enterprises Development	Sithembiso Gile Gladys Nyoni MP
Minister of Local Government, Public Works and Urban Development	Dr Ignatious Morgan Chombo MP
Minister of Justice, Legal and Parliamentary Affairs	Sen Patrick Antony Chinamasa
Minister of State for Public and Interactive Affairs	Chenhanho Chakezha Chimutengwende MP
Minister of Agriculture	Sylvester Nguni MP (Acting)
Minister of Education Sport and Culture	Sen Aeneas Chigwedere (Acting)
Minister of Environment and Tourism	Francis Dunstan Chenayimoyo Nhema MP
Minister of Transport and Communications	Christopher Chindeti Mushohwe MP (Acting)
Minister of Youth Development and Medium Enterprises Development	Ambrose Mutinhiri MP
Minister of Mines and Mining Development	Sydney Sekeramayi MP (Acting)
Minister of State for State Enterprises, Anti-Monopolies and Anti Corruption	XXXX
Minister of State for Policy Implementation	Webster Kotiwani Shamu MP
Minister of State for Special Affairs Responsible for Land and Resettlement Programme	Flora Buka MP
Minister of Energy and Power Development	Michael Rueben Nyambuya MP
Minister of Foreign Affairs	Simbarashe Simbanenduku Mumbengegwi MP
Minister of Information and Publicity	Paul Munyaradzi Mangwana MP (Acting)
Minister of State Water Resources and Infrastructural Development	Sen Joseph Made (Acting)
Provincial Governor of Mashonaland East	Sen Aeneas Chigwedere
Provincial Governor of Mashonaland West	Sen Faber Chidarikire
Provincial Governor of Mashonaland Central	Sen Martin Dinha
Provincial Governor of Masvingo	Sen Willard Chiwewe
Provincial Governor of Matabeleland North	Sen Thokozile Mathuthu
Provincial Governor of Matabeleland South	Sen Angeline Masuku
Provincial Governor of Manicaland	Sen Christopher Mushohwe
Provincial Governor of Midlands	Sen Cephas Msipa
Provincial Governor of Harare	Sen David Ishemunyoro Godi Karimanzira
Provincial Governor of Bulawayo	Sen Cain Ginyilitshe Ndabazekhaya Mathema
