= Baba Jukwa =

Anonymous Zimbabwean political blogger

"Baba Jukwa" (Shona: "Jukwa's father") is a self-given nickname for a Zimbabwean political online blogger. He is believed to be part of the Vapanduki crew (a Shona word, translated as "rebels" or "defectors"), a group which includes disgruntled ZANU-PF insiders, service chiefs and other civil servants in Zimbabwe. Most of his writings are brought out via his Facebook page, which boasts over 400,000 followers.

According to information in the mainstream media and Baba Jukwa's page, the main purpose of the blog is to protect the public by pre-empting some secretive operations by the ruling party, including murder, assassination and corruption plots, voter intimidation and vote-rigging.

The faceless Baba Jukwa has successfully exposed a lot of corrupt ZANU-PF officials and assassination plots. The politician Edward Chindori-Chininga had criticized the diamond industry in Zimbabwe. After Chininga's death in a roadside accident on 19 June 2013, Baba Jukwa stated, "I told you there will be body bags coming this year... The war has begun." Nomatter Khumalo, a United States-based Zimbabwean quoted in The Daily Telegraph, argued that "Baba Jukwa" is likely a mole who lives outside of Zimbabwe and uses a network of informants who are likely unknowing of each other's presences, since it would be too unsafe for the "Baba Jukwa" to be residing in Zimbabwe. It was initially believed Baba Jukwa was one individual. However, a close analysis of the writing style reveals that there could be many editors around the world and contributors who gather secret information from within ZANU-PF top meetings and security meetings and share it on the blog, using one account collaboratively as "Baba Jukwa".

It was reported in June 2013 that Mugabe's ZANU-PF offered a bounty of US$300,000 to unmask the person(s) behind Baba Jukwa. All efforts to date have been futile. However, Chininga's death was believed to have been orchestrated by individuals within ZANU-PF who believed he was feeding information to Baba Jukwa.

== "Baba Jukwa" unmasked ==
Edmund Kudzayi, editor of Zimbabwe's Sunday Mail, and his brother Phillip were arrested in June 2014 and charged with attempting to subvert a constitutionally-elected government, in connection with the Baba Jukwa case.

Kudzayi claims he is not "Baba Jukwa" and that his arrest was politically charged and came from higher-ups in the Government and ruling ZANU-PF Party who are afraid he could expose them for feeding Baba Jukwa with sensitive government information.

It is believed that Rugare Gumbo is Baba Jukwa.
