= Mutinhiri =

Mutinhiri is a surname. Notable people with the surname include:

- Ambrose Mutinhiri (born 1944), Zimbabwean politician
- Tracy Mutinhiri, Zimbabwean politician
- Vimbai Mutinhiri (born 1987), Zimbabwean actress, model, and television personality
