= Chigudu =

Chigudu is a surname. Notable people with the surname include:

- Simukai Chigudu (born 1986), Zimbabwean scholar of African politics
- Tinaye Chigudu (1942–2025), Zimbabwean politician
