= Nomalanga =

Nomalanga is a feminine given name, derived from the Nguni word langa, meaning "sun." Notable people with the name include:

- Nomalanga Khumalo, Zimbabwean politician
- Rethabile Nomalanga Khumalo (born 1996), South African musician
- Nomalanga Shozi (born 1994), South African actress
