= Minister of State for Provincial Affairs and Devolution for Mashonaland West =

- Incumbent; Marian Chombo since 12 September 2023
- Minister of State for Provincial Affairs
- Style: The Honourable
- Member of: Cabinet of Zimbabwe; Parliament of Zimbabwe
- Reports to: The President
- Seat: New Government Complex, 7 Robert Mugabe, Chinhoyi
- Appointer: The President
- Term length: Five years, renewable for a second or subsequent term of office
- Constituting instrument: Provincial Councils and Administration Act (Chapter 29:11)
- Precursor: Provincial Governor of Mashonaland West
- Formation: 22 August 2013
- Deputy: Permanent Secretary for Provincial Affairs and Devolution
- Website: mashwest.gov.zw

The Minister of State for Provincial Affairs and Devolution for Mashonaland West is the Provincial Minister of State for Mashonaland East in Zimbabwe. The minister oversees provincial affairs and sits in the Parliament of Zimbabwe. The minister is appointed by the President of Zimbabwe and is appointed for a term of five years, which can be renewed for a second or subsequent term. Historically, the minister held the title Governor of Mashonaland West, but the office has since been renamed to align with the 2013 Constitution of Zimbabwe, which does not allow for Provincial Governors.

== List of Ministers of State ==
Parliamentary position: Elected Member of the House of Assembly Elected Member of the Senate Non-Elected Minister

No.	Name Birth–Death	Term in office	Party	Appointed by
Provincial Governors
	Mudhomeni Chivende; 1939 - 26 September 2015	2 March 1984 – 1 April 1990	ZANU-PF	Robert Mugabe
	Witness Rukarwa d. 1995	1 April 1990 – January 1994	ZANU-PF	Robert Mugabe
	Ignatius Chombo b. 1 August 1952	17 January 1994 – 13 April 1995	ZANU-PF	Robert Mugabe
	Swithun Mombeshora; 20 August 1945 – 19 March 2003	13 April 1995 – 9 May 1996	ZANU-PF	Robert Mugabe
	Peter Chanetsa; 15 July 1946 – 2 January 2017	9 May 1996 – 1 December 2003	ZANU-PF	Robert Mugabe
	Nelson Samkange; 1931 - 29 October 2013	1 December 2003 – 24 August 2008	ZANU-PF	Robert Mugabe
	Faber Chidarikire b. 6 June 1946	24 August 2008 – 28 June 2013	ZANU-PF	Robert Mugabe
Ministers of State for Provincial Affairs
	Faber Chidarikire b. 6 June 1946	25 August 2013 – 9 October 2017	ZANU-PF	Robert Mugabe
	Webster Shamu b. 6 June 1945	9 October 2017 – 29 July 2018	ZANU-PF	Robert Mugabe; Emmerson Mnangagwa
	Mary Mliswa b. 22 December 1974	10 September 2018 – 22 August 2023	ZANU-PF	Emmerson Mnangagwa
	Marian Chombo b. 11 August 1960	12 September 2023 – present	ZANU-PF	Emmerson Mnangagwa

== See also ==
- List of current provincial governors of Zimbabwe
