= Isaac Matongo =

Zimbabwean politician and labor activist

Isaac Matongo (12 March 1947 – 2 May 2007) was a Zimbabwean politician and labor activist, born in Fort Victoria, Southern Rhodesia.

== Career ==
Matongo was elected vice-president of the National Engineering Workers' Union in 1988, eventually serving in the same position with the Zimbabwe Congress of Trade Unions. He was the founding chairman of the Movement for Democratic Change (MDC), which is now the main opposition to the ZANU-PF party led by Robert Mugabe. He was critical of Mugabe for ruining the country's agriculture.

He died on 2 May 2007 of suspected heart failure. He was survived by his wife and fellow MDC colleague Evelyn Masaiti, the MP for Mutasa from 2000 to 2005, and their eight children.

== Sources ==
- "Hundreds of mourners pay last respects to Matongo" swradioafrica.com, 4 May 2007^{[usurped]}
- Zimbabwe: MDC Chair Isaac Matongo found dead, zimdaily.com, 2 May 2007
