= Minister of State in the President's Office (Zimbabwe) =

The Minister of State in the President's Office is a non-cabinet ministerial position in the government of Zimbabwe. The position is vacant, following the promotion of John Nkomo to vice-president.
