= Elphas Mukonoweshuro =

Zimbabwean political scientist and politician

The Right Honourable Elphas Mukonoweshuro MP

Minister of Public Service of Zimbabwe
- In office 13 February 2009 – 5 August 2011
- Prime Minister: Morgan Tsvangirai
- Preceded by: Nicholas Goche

Personal details
- Born: c. 1953
- Died: 5 August 2011 (aged 58) South Africa
- Party: Movement for Democratic Change-Tsvangirai
- Education: University of Zimbabwe

Elphas Mukonoweshuro (c. 1953 – 5 August 2011) was a Zimbabwean political scientist and politician. A former University of Zimbabwe dean of social studies, he was the Movement for Democratic Change-Tsvangirai member of parliament for Gutu South in Masvingo Province.

On 10 February 2009, Morgan Tsvangirai designated Mukonoweshuro for the position of Minister of Public Service as part of the Zimbabwe Government of National Unity of 2009.

Mukonoweshuro died after a short illness in South Africa on 5 August 2011.
