= Seiso Moyo =

Zimbabwean politician

Deputy Minister of Agriculture, Mechanisation and Irrigation
- In office 11 October 2011 – 21 December 2012
- Prime Minister: Morgan Tsvangirai

Personal details
- Born: 3 September 1956
- Died: 21 December 2012 (aged 56) Harare
- Party: MDC-T
- Children: Five children

Seiso Moyo (3 September 1956 – 21 December 2012) was a Zimbabwean politician, who served as deputy minister of agriculture from 11 October 2011 to 21 December 2012.

== Early life and education ==
Moyo was born on 3 September 1956. He was a graduate of the Mzilikazi Secondary School.

== Career ==
Moyo began his career as a social worker. Later he dealt with business leadership, non-governmental organisation management and rehabilitation management in several universities.

In the 1970s he was involved in politics and became district secretary for the Zapu youth in Thabalala. He became a member of Movement for Democratic Change – Tsvangirai (MDC-T) party when it was founded. He acted as secretary for elections in MDC-T. He was a member of the House of Assembly for Nketa-Emganwini Constituency for MDC-T. He served as deputy minister of agriculture, mechanisation and irrigation from 11 October 2011 to 21 December 2012 in the cabinet of prime minister Morgan Tsvangirai.

== Personal life ==
Moyo was married and had five children.

== Death and funeral ==
Moyo died of a heart attack at the Avenues Clinic in Harare on 21 December 2012. He was 56 years old. Church service was held for him at Lutheran Church in Tshabalala on 24 December. Then his body was buried at Lady Stanley cemetery in Tshabalala on the same day. His funeral was attended by senior politicians from different political parties.
