= John Nkomo =

Zimbabwean politician

The Honourable John Nkomo

Second Vice-President of Zimbabwe
- In office 13 December 2009 – 17 January 2013
- President: Robert Mugabe
- Preceded by: Joseph Msika
- Succeeded by: Phelekezela Mphoko

Speaker of Parliament of Zimbabwe
- In office 1 April 2005 – 5 March 2008
- President: Robert Mugabe
- Preceded by: Emmerson Mnangagwa
- Succeeded by: Lovemore Moyo

Deputy Leader of the ZANU–PF Party
- In office 1 December 2009 – 17 January 2013
- Preceded by: Joseph Msika

Chairman of the ZANU–PF Party
- In office 1 January 2006 – 26 August 2009
- Preceded by: Joseph Msika
- Succeeded by: Simon Khaya-Moyo & Oppah Muchinguri

Personal details
- Born: 22 August 1934 Southern Rhodesia
- Died: 17 January 2013 (aged 78) St Anne's Hospital in Harare, Zimbabwe
- Party: ZANU–PF
- Spouse: Georgina Ngwenya

John Landa Nkomo (22 August 1934 – 17 January 2013) was a Zimbabwean politician who served as Vice-President of Zimbabwe from 2009 to 2013. After serving for years as a minister in the government of Zimbabwe, he was the Speaker of Parliament from 2005 to 2008. He was then appointed to the Senate in 2008 and was Minister of State in the President's Office in 2009. Nkomo was also a key figure in the Zimbabwe African National Union – Patriotic Front (ZANU–PF); he was National Chairman of ZANU–PF until December 2009, when he was elected as Vice President of ZANU–PF. As a consequence of his elevation to the party's vice presidency, he also became Vice President of Zimbabwe in December 2009.

== Political career ==
Nkomo was a member of Joshua Nkomo's Zimbabwe African People's Union (ZAPU) before the party merged with Robert Mugabe's Zimbabwe African National Union (ZANU) to create ZANU–PF in 1987. He was Minister of Labour, Manpower Planning, and Social Welfare as of May 1990.

Nkomo, who had previously served as Minister of Home Affairs, was moved to the position of Minister of Special Affairs in the President's Office in a cabinet reshuffle on 25 August 2002. This was seen as a demotion and was attributed to a power play in ZANU–PF. Following the March 2005 parliamentary election, he became Speaker of Parliament in April 2005.

In November 2006, while serving his term as the Speaker of Parliament, John Nkomo shocked many people declaring his intention to seek the candidature for ZANU–PF for the next presidential election. Nkomo did not seek the nomination, however, as President Robert Mugabe chose to run for re-election.

Nkomo did not stand as a candidate in the 2008 parliamentary election, but following the election he was appointed to the Senate by Mugabe on 25 August 2008. Later, when the national unity government was appointed in February 2009, he became Minister of State in the President's Office.

Nkomo was widely viewed as a moderate member within the ZANU–PF leadership. He was elected as Vice President of ZANU–PF by a party congress on 12 December 2009, succeeding Joseph Msika, who had died a few months beforehand. He was then sworn in as Vice President of Zimbabwe by President Mugabe on 14 December. Along with Joyce Mujuru (who represents the party's ZANU wing), Nkomo was one of two vice presidents. In an interview at the time of his swearing-in, Nkomo expressed his commitment to the success of the national unity government and said that he would work to facilitate the achievement of its goals.

== Court battles ==
Nkomo was embroiled in a number of high-profile court battles in Zimbabwe that received media coverage. In July 2006, he was in court fighting for a farm situated in Lupane, 200 km from Bulawayo.

== United States travel restriction ==
From 2003 until his death in 2013, Nkomo was among a number of individuals not allowed to travel to the United States because the US government alleged he worked to undermine democracy and rule of law in Zimbabwe.

== Death ==
Nkomo died of cancer at St Anne's Hospital in Harare, Zimbabwe on 17 January 2013 at the age of 78. He was a long time member of the Seventh-day Adventist Church.
