= Collen Gwiyo =

Zimbabwean politician

Collen Cephas Gwiyo is the deputy secretary general of the Zimbabwe Congress of Trade Unions. In 2008, he contested the Zengeza East constituency in the House of Assembly for the MDC-Tsvangirai faction, defeating Arthur Mutambara (the head of a rival faction of the MDC who remerged his faction with Tsvangirai's after the first round of the presidential election), ZANU-PF candidate Patrick Nyaruwata, and UPP candidate Simba Maxwe.
