= Lovemore Moyo =

Zimbabwean politician

Speaker of the House of Assembly of Zimbabwe
- In office 25 August 2008 – 3 September 2013
- President: Robert Mugabe
- Prime Minister: Morgan Tsvangirai
- Preceded by: John Nkomo
- Succeeded by: Jacob Mudenda

National Chairman of the MDC-T
- Incumbent
- Assumed office 2 June 2006
- Preceded by: Isaac Matongo

Personal details
- Born: 29 January 1965 (age 61) Kezi, Southern Rhodesia
- Party: Movement for Democratic Change - Tsvangirai
- Occupation: Member of Parliament of the MDC-T

Lovemore Moyo (born 29 January 1965) is a Zimbabwean politician who was Speaker of the House of Assembly of Zimbabwe from 2008 to 2013. He was the National Chairman of the Movement for Democratic Change – Tsvangirai (MDC-T) party led by Morgan Tsvangirai from 2006 to 2018.

== Political career ==
Moyo joined the Zimbabwe African People's Union during the Rhodesian Bush War. He was based in Zambia until 1980. He later joined a political pressure group called Open Forum. He is a founding member of the Forum Party of Zimbabwe. He later founded a political and cultural pressure group Imbavane Yamahlabezulu.

In 1999 Moyo became a founding member of the MDC. He was elected Secretary of the Matabeleland South Provincial Executive and also a National Council Member. In June 2000 he was elected as the member of parliament for Matobo Constituency in Matabeleland South Province. He was a member of the Portfolio Committee on Education, Sport and Culture and on Public Accounts Committee.

In the March 2005 parliamentary election, Moyo was re-elected to represent the same constituency and continued to serve on the Parliamentary Portfolio Committee on Education, Sport and Culture and on Public Accounts. He is also a member of the SADC Parliamentary Forum (SADC PF).

=== Speaker of the House of Assembly ===
In 2006, Moyo succeeded Isaac Matongo as National Chairman of the MDC. In the March 2008 parliamentary election, Moyo was re-elected to the House of Assembly as an MDC-Tsvangirai candidate from Matobo North constituency. He received 3,503 votes, defeating Kotsho Dube of ZANU-PF, who received 3,102 votes. When Parliament first met for its new term on 25 August 2008, Moyo was elected as Speaker of Parliament, receiving 110 out of 208 votes in the House of Assembly in a secret ballot. Moyo reportedly received 99 votes from MDC-Tsvangirai faction MPs, seven votes from MDC-Mutambara faction MPs, and four votes from ZANU-PF MPs. ZANU-PF did not present a candidate against Moyo and instead supported Paul Themba Nyathi of the Movement for Democratic Change faction led by Arthur Mutambara.

Following his election as Speaker, Moyo predicted that Parliament would henceforth be a meaningful check on the executive, which would need to "find ways of negotiating with the legislature in order to put through programs". Although he pledged that he would be neutral in presiding over the House of Assembly, he also suggested that he would not set aside the MDC position that Robert Mugabe's re-election in the 2008 presidential election was illegitimate.
