= Patrick Kombayi =

Zimbabwean businessman and politician

Patrick Kombayi (2 November 1938 – 20 June 2009) was a Zimbabwean businessman, a former mayor of Gweru and an active member of the Movement for Democratic Change-Tsvangirai faction in the Midlands Province. He served in the Senate of Zimbabwe for the Chirumhanzu-Gweru senatorial constituency. Kombayi, a student of Robert Mugabe, was the first black train driver in Zimbabwe. He joined Rhodesia Railways after pursuing an unsatisfying career as a schoolteacher. Posted to Zambia, Kombayi became involved with the Zimbabwe African National Union.

== Assassination attempt ==
In 1990, he campaigned against Simon Muzenda but was shot during his campaign. He was left permanently disabled. This wound was to kill him 19 years later. The men responsible for the shooting were convicted of the crime but never spent a day in prison, as they were pardoned by Mugabe.

== House of Assembly Elections 2008 ==
In early 2008, he was arrested for defacing a road with two of his election agents.

Personal Details Death: Kombayi died in 2009. He was reported to have died from the wounds he sustained from the 1990 shooting though he had survived for about 19 years. The MDC faction under Tsvangirai tried to advocate for him to be granted hero status for the role he played during the liberation struggle. [1] But he was unable to meet the criteria used for the hero selection by the Zanu PF politburo.

No other information was found on his age, place of birth, or family.

School / Education No information could be found on his Junior or High School, or any tertiary education.

Service / Career He was a former mayor of Gweru, served as a Member of Parliament for Gweru-Chirumhanzi. He later defected from the Zimbabwe African National Union Patriotic Front (ZANU PF) to join the Zimbabwe Unity Movement (ZUM), a political party which was formed by Edgar Tekere who was also an ex-ZANU PF senior member. He was controversially shot in 1990 and it was reported that he was shot by Simon Muzenda's (late vice first vice president of Zimbabwe) bodyguards who were pardoned by Robert Mugabe though they were found guilty. He was a staunch member of the Movement for Democratic Change (MDC) and was aligned to Morgan Tsvangirai's faction until the time of his death.

Kombayi was a member of ZANU PF during the liberation struggle and he aided the party's military wing financially. [2] He procured arms and ammunition of ZANLA.[3] He is also credited for distributing food stuffs and clothes to both families of the detained ZANLA guerrillas and the party members and the guerrillas who used to collect war equipment from his club. For this sterling work he was doing, Kombayi was appointed as the head of the Food Committee during the liberation struggle.[3]

During the detente period, 1975-1976 (a period when the liberation struggle had gone into abeyance), he filled the power vacuum created by the arrest of senior Zanu PF leaders on the basis that they were implicated in the assassination of Herbert Chitepo in 1975. It was during this period in which he was alleged that he began to harbour ambitions of being the president of the party. [3] He tried to gain the support of the detained members of the High Command but he failed. Mugabe is said to have blocked Kombayi's ascendancy to power as he was also alleged to be harbouring ambitions of being at the helm of the party. [3] This was on the basis that he was a senior member of the party, who had taught Kombayi for his primary education in Gweru.[3]

Mugabe had been coincidentally released from prison at the time when most of the senior party members were being arrested. Hence according to him, he was the ideal candidate. It has been claimed that from then onwards, tension between Mugabe and Kombayi began to blossom to such an extent that Kombayi argued that Mugabe will persecute all his nemesis up to the grave including him.[4]

After failing to clinch the highest and most prestigious post in the party, Kombayi began to demand to be repaid for all what he had done for the party.[3] He however died yet to receive a dim from his former party.

Events The 1990 Tragedy Kombayi defected from Zanu PF and he became a member of ZUM which was formed by Edgar Tekere in the late 1980s after he had been expelled from Zanu PF in 1988. He was appointed as the National Organising Secretary of ZUM. [5] Whilst campaigning for the 1990 elections he was shot on 24 March, three days before the elections for campaigning against Simon Muzenda for a parliamentary seat in Gweru-Chirumhanzi constituency. [5] It was alleged that the assassins, Elias Kanengoni who was said to be the Gweru Central Intelligence Organisation's leader, was Muzenda's body guard as well as Kizito Chivamba. [5] The two were found guilty of the crime, sentenced but they were pardoned. [6]

Reports from the police stated that Kombayi incited the violence which turned out to be nasty in the end. It was reported that before the shooting, Kombayi had followed Muzenda's vehicle, shot the tyres before setting the vehicle on fire. [7] Kombayi brushed this, arguing that it was only a pretext for justifying a somewhat heinous crime committed by Kanengoni and Chivamba which left him permanently disabled. He went to the United States of America to seek treatment something which costed him a fortune as a result of an unexpected 'barbaric' event. [5]

In the 1990 Parliamentary Election (see A History of Zimbabwean Elections) Gweru Central returned to Parliament:

Simon Muzenda of Zanu PF with 14 083 votes, Patrick Kombayi of ZUM with 5 234 votes, Bernard Kutesera of UANC with 285 votes. Turnout - 20 173 voters or 52.54%

Kombayi’s 2006 Case In March 2006 Kombayi won a defamation suit against Emmerson Mnangagwa for making false claims about his role in the liberation struggle. [5] This had been published in an autobiography of Simon Muzenda. Prior to that, Kombayi had assisted students from the Midlands State University (MSU) who had been expelled from the institution under undisclosed offences which were however suspected to be political. [2]

Business Kombayi had a number of businesses both before and after independence. Before independence Kombayi was a "rich business man" in Zambia. [8]

After independence, Kombayi owned a number of business in Gweru where he resided, including the city's then largest hotel, the Midlands Hotel.
