= Rushinga (senatorial constituency) =

- Former Senatorial constituency for the Parliament of Zimbabwe
- Region: Mashonaland Central
- Population: 60,974

Former constituency
- Created: 2008
- Abolished: 2013
- Seats: 1

Rushinga was a Senatorial constituency in the Senate of Zimbabwe. It covered most of the Rushinga District in Mashonaland Central Province, and was one of six senatorial constituencies in the province.

The equivalent seats in the House of Assembly were:

- Rushinga

In the 2008 election, the constituency elected Damien Mumvuri as senator after campaigning unopposed.
