= Tracy Mutinhiri =

Zimbabwean politician

Tracy Mutinhiri is a Zimbabwean politician who served as the Deputy Minister of Labour and Social Welfare. She represented Marondera East (ZANU-PF) in the House of Assembly.

Since 2009, there have been rumours that Mutinhiri is sympathetic to the MDC party. This has led to various forms of threats and harassment against her, especially after the reelection of Lovemore Moyo as speaker of parliament at the end of March 2011. In this election, Mutinhiri was suspected to be one of the two ZANU-PF votes in favour of the MDC candidate. The attacks also included attempted invasions of her farm in Marondera.

She was on the European Union sanctions list from 2007 to 2011.
