= Zaka (senatorial constituency) =

- Former Senatorial constituency for the Parliament of Zimbabwe
- Region: Masvingo
- Population: 100,610

Former constituency
- Created: 2008
- Abolished: 2013
- Seats: 1

Zaka was a Senatorial constituency in the Senate of Zimbabwe. It covered most of the Zaka district in Masvingo Province, and was one of six senatorial constituencies in the province.

The equivalent seats in the House of Assembly were:

- Zaka East
- Zaka West
- Zaka Central
- Zaka North

In the 2008 election, the constituency elected MDC member Misheck Marava as senator. He won with 24,202 votes while Zanu PF's Amoth Chingombe polled 18,578 and an independent Moffat Mufuka got 1,296. The campaign also brought electoral violence to the district, when two MDC activists were killed by ZANU PF members at the MDC's campaign office in Zaka.
