= Fungai Chaderopa =

Zimbabwean politician

Fungai Chaderopa is a Zimbabwean politician. Elected in 2008, she served in the parliament of Zimbabwe, representing the Sanyati constituency. With the help of the Zimbabwe Republic Police, she caused the capture, unlawful imprisonment and torture of Movement for Democratic Change – Tsvangirai activists who opposed her views. She reran in 2013, but lost.
