= Sibonile Nyamudeza =

Zimbabwean politician

Sibonile Nyamudeza is the MDC-T winning candidate for Chipinge West in the March 2008 elections in Zimbabwe. He was born at Tanganda in Chipinge on 10 March 1967. After completing his high school education at Gideon Mhlanga High School, Hon. Nyamudeza studied for a qualification in machine shop engineering, which he obtained in 1987.

He then worked for the Ministry of Public Construction before starting his own business in construction. Nyamudeza joined the MDC in 2002 and assumed the position of ward vice chairperson.
