= Simon Khaya Moyo =

Zimbabwean politician (1945–2021)

Minister of Media, Information and Broadcasting Services
- In office October 2017 – September 2018
- President: Emmerson Mnangagwa

Chairman of ZANU-PF
- In office 2011–2014
- Leader: Robert Mugabe; Emmerson Mnangagwa
- Preceded by: John Landa Nkomo
- Succeeded by: Post temporarily abolished

Ambassador to South Africa
- In office 2 February 2007 – 2 March 2011
- President: Robert Mugabe
- Succeeded by: Phelekezela Mphoko

Secretary for Information and Publicity
- In office December 2014 – 14 November 2021

Personal details
- Born: October 1, 1945
- Died: November 14, 2021 (aged 76)
- Party: ZANU-PF
- Education: Makerere University (BA)

Simon Khaya Moyo (1 October 1945 – 14 November 2021) was a Zimbabwean politician and Chairman of ZANU-PF at the time of his death. He was the Ambassador of Zimbabwe to South Africa from 2007 to 2011.

He was appointed Media, Information and Broadcasting Services Minister in October 2017, taking over from Christopher Mushohwe. However, he was later removed from the Zimbabwe Cabinet in September 2018.

Khaya-Moyo was placed on the United States sanctions list in 2003.

He died on 14 November 2021 due to cancer at Mater Dei Hospital in Bulawayo.

== Early life ==
Simon Khaya-Moyo was born on 1 October 1945 in the Bukalanga Sanzukwi area of Bulilima in Matabeleland South Province. He did his secondary education studies at Fletcher High School in Gweru and left in 1965. From 1966 to 1967, he served as a research assistant at Mpilo Hospital in Bulawayo.

== Political career ==
In 1968, he crossed the border into Zambia to join the liberation struggle.

== See also ==
- South Africa–Zimbabwe relations
