= Edward Chindori-Chininga =

Zimbabwean politician

Edward Takaruza Chindori-Chininga (March 14, 1955 – June 19, 2013) was a Zimbabwean politician. He was MP for Guruve South, and the Minister of Mines and Mining Development (2000–2004). He was declared a national liberation hero by the government of Zimbabwe in 2013.

Chindori-Chininga was born and raised in South Guruve in the north of Zimbabwe. Chindori-Chininga was of Shona descent. He was the first in the Chininga family to receive the prefix 'Chindori' and his wife and children are the only other individuals who legally bare the full name 'Chindori-Chininga.' He showed signs of great intelligence from an early age prompting his father to make family sacrifices to fund his son's education. At 19 he received a full scholarship to study business in France where he learnt to speak French fluently. This developed into a career in tourism and politics sending him to the United States where he met his wife, Linda Lewis.

He had a thriving political career acquiring the position of President of Alliance Française, Harare, Zimbabwe and the Deputy Minister of Tourism during his late 30s and early 40s.

From 2003 until shortly before his death, he was placed on the United States sanctions list. Throughout 2004 and 2005 he advocated repairing relations with the United Kingdom. He described himself as "an Anglophile" but "also an African nationalist." In early 2005 he said he believed Zimbabwe and the United Kingdom should "go back to being friends and partners." Chindori-Chininga added that his favorite sport was cricket and his favorite poet was Alfred, Lord Tennyson. The book, "Blood Diamonds - Facets of Power", by Richard Saunders depicts rampant mining theft, associated deaths and poor working conditions in Zimbabwe's mining industry. The book is dedicated to Chininga with a dedication in the opening pages reading, "To the people of Zimbabwe and Edward Chindori-Chininga, who knew these stories." In 2005 Chininga ran against Biggie Chigonero to be the MP representing Guruve South. In that election Chindori-Chininga won 16,801 votes to Chigonero's 3,375 votes.

https://www.heraldonline.co.zw/chindori-chininga-declared-liberation-hero/

== Death ==
On June 19, 2013, he died in a traffic collision at the age of 58, in very mysterious circumstances. Chininga was extremely critical of Robert Mugabe and had recently blown the whistle over some missing monies from gem and mining sales. Several people had warned him that he was likely to be assassinated over it. His death had been predicted by Baba Jukwa - a Facebook page belonging to a claimed "disgruntled insider from President Robert Mugabe’s Zanu-PF party". He is praised as one of the most incorruptible politicians of the post-liberation Zimbabwe. He is outlived by his wife, Linda and his 3 daughters, Matiiapa, Krystal and Stephanie.

Chininga had been removed from Mugabe's ruling party in 2011 after it was alleged he had leaked information to the Movement for Democratic Change. He also had survived another traffic collision in March 2012.
