= Evelyn Masaiti =

Zimbabwean politician

Evelyn Masaiti is the Zimbabwe Deputy Minister of Women's Affairs, Gender and Community Development. She is the Member of House of Assembly for Dzivaresekwa (MDC-T).
