= Peter Chanetsa =

Zimbabwe politician (1946–2017)

Peter Tapera Chanetsa (15 July 1946 – 2 January 2017) was a Zimbabwean politician.

== Biography ==
Born 15 July 1946, Chanetsa was a ZANU–PF who was appointed as the first African Chief of Protocol in the Zimbabwean government. He was also a governor of the Mashonaland West Province, as well as serving as an MP for Hurungwe North from 2000 to 2005. During his tenure, he was known for his skepticism toward land reform bills, with him attempting to seize 874 hectares of farmland owned by nuns in 2004. He was later a diplomat.

He was married to ombudswoman Beatrice Chanetsa.

In 2016, Lavender Makoni nearly sentenced Chanetsa to prison for the remainder of his life, but he instead took a $19,000 fine, in which he was ordered to pay CBZ Bank Limited $1,000 until the debt was repaid.

On 26 December, he was admitted to Parirenyatwa Hospital for illness, where he died on 2 January 2017, aged 70, of heart failure. He was buried on 2 January, in the National Heroes' Acre. He was also declared a national hero.
