= Minister of State for Provincial Affairs and Devolution for Masvingo =

- Incumbent; Ezra Chadzamira since 10 September 2018
- Minister of State for Provincial Affairs
- Style: The Honourable
- Member of: Cabinet of Zimbabwe; Parliament of Zimbabwe
- Reports to: The President
- Seat: Benjamin Burombo Building, Masvingo
- Appointer: The President
- Term length: Five years, renewable for a second or subsequent term of office
- Constituting instrument: Provincial Councils and Administration Act (Chapter 29:11)
- Precursor: Provincial Governor of Masvingo
- Formation: 22 August 2013
- Deputy: Permanent Secretary for Provincial Affairs and Devolution
- Website: testdomain13.gov.zw

The Minister of State for Provincial Affairs and Devolution for Masvingo is the Provincial Minister of State for Masvingo in Zimbabwe. The minister oversees provincial affairs and sits in the Parliament of Zimbabwe. The minister is appointed by the President of Zimbabwe and is appointed for a term of five years, which can be renewed for a second or subsequent term. Historically, the minister held the title Governor of Masvingo, but the office has since been renamed to align with the 2013 Constitution of Zimbabwe, which does not allow for Provincial Governors.

== List of Ministers of State ==
Parliamentary position: Elected Member of the House of Assembly Elected Member of the Senate Non-Elected Minister

| No. | Name Birth–Death | Term in office | Party | Appointed by |
Provincial Governors
| 1 | Dzikamai Mavhaire (Note: Mavhaire was elected MP to the House of Assembly in 1980. He was a Senator following the 1985 elections. The Senate was abolished in 1987.) b. 7 March 1948 | 2 March 1984 – 1 April 1990 | ZANU-PF | Robert Mugabe |
| 2 | Josiah Hungwe; 7 November 1935 - 6 September 2021 | 1 April 1990 – 12 April 2005 | ZANU-PF | Robert Mugabe |
| 3 | Willard Chiwewe | 12 April 2005 – 30 April 2008 | ZANU-PF | Robert Mugabe |
| 4 | Titus Maluleke | 25 August 2008 – 28 June 2013 | ZANU-PF | Robert Mugabe |
Ministers of State for Provincial Affairs
| 1 | Kudakwashe Bhasikiti b.6 February 1962 | 11 September 2013 – 19 February 2015 | ZANU-PF | Robert Mugabe |
| 2 | Shuvai Mahofa; 4 April 1941 - 14 August 2017 | 23 February 2015 – 14 August 2017 | ZANU-PF | Robert Mugabe |
| 3 | Paul Chimedza b. 29 June 1967 | 9 October 2017 – 21 November 2017 | ZANU-PF | Robert Mugabe |
| 4 | Josiah Hungwe; 7 November 1935 - 6 September 2021 | 4 December 2017 – 29 July 2018 | ZANU-PF | Emmerson Mnangagwa |
| 5 | Ezra Chadzamira b. 12 February 1965 | 10 September 2018 – present | ZANU-PF | Emmerson Mnangagwa |

== See also ==
- List of current provincial governors of Zimbabwe
