= Bright Matonga =

Zimbabwean politician

Bright Matonga is a Zimbabwean politician. He was the Deputy Information Minister in the cabinet of president Robert Mugabe. In the 2008 parliamentary election, as a member of the Zimbabwe African National Union – Patriotic Front, he was elected from the Mhondoro-Ngezi constituency.

He was placed on the United States sanctions list in 2005.
