= Nomalanga Khumalo =

Zimbabwean politician

Nomalanga Mzilikazi Khumalo MP

Deputy Speaker of the House of Assembly
- Incumbent
- Assumed office September 2008
- President: Robert Mugabe
- Prime Minister: Morgan Tsvangirai
- Preceded by: Joram Gumbo

Member of the Seventh Zimbabwean Parliament for Umzingwane
- Incumbent
- Assumed office June 2000
- Preceded by: Thenjiwe Lesabe
- Majority: 1,382(11.7%)

Personal details
- Party: Movement for Democratic Change

Nomalanga Mzilikazi Khumalo is a Zimbabwean politician.

Khumalo is the Movement for Democratic Change member of parliament for Umzingwane and was in September 2008 elected as Deputy Speaker of the House of Assembly, in the Seventh Zimbabwean parliament.
