= Tinaye Chigudu =

Zimbabwean politician

- Born: Elisha Nzirasha Chigudu; 13 August 1942; Zimbabwe
- Died: 5 February 2025 (aged 82)
- Occupation: Politician

Tinaye Chigudu (13 August 1942 – 5 February 2025) was a Zimbabwean politician. In 2008, he served as a Provincial Governor Minister for Manicaland Province of Zimbabwe, as well as a former member of parliament. He was a member of ZANU–PF.
