= Nelson Samkange =

Zimbabwean politician

Nelson Tapera Chrispen Samkange
- Born: Zimbabwe
- Occupation: Politician

Nelson Tapera Chrispen Samkange was a Zimbabwean politician. In 2008, he served as a Provincial Governor Minister for Mashonaland West Province of Zimbabwe, as well as a former member of parliament. He was a member of ZANU–PF.
