= Tichaona Mudzingwa =

Zimbabwean politician

Col. (rtd.) Dr. Tichaona Mudzingwa was the Zimbabwe Deputy Minister of Transport and Infrastructural Development. He died on April 10, 2012, at the age of 69.
