= Andrew Langa =

Zimbabwean politician (born 1965)

Andrew Langa (born 13 January 1965) is the former Zimbabwe Cabinet member, Minister of Sport and Culturee He is the Member of House of Assembly for Insiza North (ZANU-PF) in Matabeleland South. Since 2005 he has been on the United States sanctions list.

Langa became a party worker for Zanu PF in 1985. He was once a Deputy Minister of Tourism and he also served as a Deputy Minister of Public Service, Labour, and Social Welfare during the era of the Government of National Unity (GNU).

When President Mugabe reorganized his cabinet in September 2013 he separated Sport, Arts and Culture from the Ministry of Education, and appointed Langa as the new minister.
