= Paul Themba Nyathi =

Zimbabwean politician

Paul Themba Nyathi is a Zimbabwean opposition politician, the director of elections for the Arthur Mutambara-led faction of the Movement for Democratic Change and a member of the Pan-African Parliament from Zimbabwe.

Nyathi was a teacher who joined the Zimbabwe African People's Union of Joshua Nkomo, fighting against the white-minority government of Ian Smith. He became a provincial executive member and was arrested and imprisoned in 1976. He was released in 1979 just prior to majority rule and the establishment of Zimbabwe. He was a member of the ZAPU central committee from 1979 until the party's Unity Accord with ZANU in 1987 created ZANU-PF. Nyathi has three sons, Ndumiso, Nicholas and Jabulani, two daughters Zibi and Sibongile. In 1999 Nyathi became a founder member of the opposition Movement for Democratic Change, and a member of the national executive.

Nyathi won the Matabeleland South constituency of Gwanda North for the MDC in the Zimbabwean parliamentary election of 2000 winning 72% of the vote.

In 2004 he was elected by the House of Assembly of Zimbabwe as one of five members of the Pan-African Parliament where he became rapporteur for the Committee on Gender, Family, Youths, and People with Disabilities.

Nyathi contested the Matabeleland South constituency of Gwanda in the Zimbabwe parliamentary elections of 2005, where he lost to the Zanu-PF candidate by only 6%.

In October 2005 he supported contesting the Senate elections, a move opposed by MDC leader Morgan Tsvangirai. This led to a split in the MDC, and Nyathi joined the pro-Senate faction of Arthur Mutambara.

In December 2005 his passport was seized and he was barred from leaving Zimbabwe.

In December 2006 he was charged with "distributing subversive literature", after delivering MDC leaflets which said the security forces were struggling to pay for food because they are poorly paid.

== See also ==
- List of members of the Pan-African Parliament
