= Ephraim Masawi =

Zimbabwean politician

Ephraim Sango Masawi
- Born: Zimbabwe
- Occupation: Politician

Ephraim Sango Masawi was a Zimbabwean politician. In 2008, he served as a Provincial Governor Minister for Mashonaland Central Province of Zimbabwe, as well as a former member of parliament. He was a member of ZANU–PF.
