= Reuben Marumahoko =

Zimbabwean politician

Reuben Marumahoko (born 4 April 1948) is a former Zimbabwe Deputy Minister of Regional Integration and International Cooperation. and former Senator for Hurungwe (ZANU-PF). Since 2003, he is placed on the United States sanctions list.
