= Angeline Masuku =

Zimbabwean politician

- Born: Zimbabwe
- Occupation: Politician

Angeline Masuku is a Zimbabwean politician. She served as a Provincial Governor Minister for Bulawayo Province of Zimbabwe, as well as a member of parliament. She is a member of ZANU–PF.
