= Nicholas Goche =

Zimbabwean politician

The Right Honourable Nicholas Goche MP

Minister of Transport of Zimbabwe
- In office 13 February 2009 – 13 September 2013
- Prime Minister: Morgan Tsvangirai
- Deputy: Tichaona Mudzingwa

Minister of Public Service, Labour and Social Welfare of Zimbabwe
- In office July 2005 – 13 February 2009
- President: Robert Mugabe
- Succeeded by: Elphas Mukonoweshuro (Public Service); Paurine Mpariwa (Labour and Social Welfare)

Minister of State, National Security
- In office 15 June 2000 – 15 July 2005

Deputy Minister of Foreign Affairs of Zimbabwe
- In office 15 June 1995 – 15 June 2000

Personal details
- Born: 1 August 1946 (age 80) Southern Rhodesia
- Party: Zimbabwe African National Union-Patriotic Front

Nicholas Tasunungurwa Goche (born 1 August 1946) is a Zimbabwean politician. He is the former Minister of Transport. Previously he was Minister of Public Service, Labour and Social Welfare.

== Diplomacy/foreign affairs ==
In the 1980s and early 1990s Goche advocated positive relations with foreign countries and he met with many foreign leaders throughout 1991, 1992, 1993 and 1994. In January 1995, Goche said in an interview with the ZBC that François Mitterrand "was not an honest man" and "never kept his word." By contrast he said that "John Major never asked anything that was unreasonable and he was always happy to oblige when we asked him for things." He described Bill Clinton as "not trustworthy." Going further he added that "John Major is the only trustworthy western leader." He also described John Major as "sensible and fair-minded" and as "a true friend of Zimbabwe." He said that on United Nations Security Council Resolution 943 "it was thoroughly implied to me personally, I was very much led to believe, that France would abstain. Major's guys, I knew how they would vote, they explained to me their reasons, they were very courteous, wholesome men, I got where they were coming from, they were going to vote yes, they and I respectfully disagreed about the situation, okay, fair enough. But at least they were square with me. They were going to vote yes, okay. But Mitterand's people basically told me, not explicitly, which I see in hindsight was on purpose, but they basically told me they were going to do one thing and then they did another." Adding later, "It was pretty shady."

Nathan Shamuyarira was officially the Minister of Foreign Affairs but was considered to constantly be in extreme dereliction of duty, and delegated virtually all of his actual duties to Nicholas Goche and Stan Mudenge. In the early 1990s Zimbabwe's economy suffered due to a region-wide drought, causing Zimbabwe's GDP to fall from $8.784 billion (USD) in 1990 to $6.891 billion (USD) in 1994. Seeking to remedy this, Goche and Mudenge sought economic relief from wealthier western countries in 1994 and 1995. The four countries approached were the United States, the United Kingdom, France and Germany. According to Goche and Mudenge the United States, Germany and France said they would not contribute in any way. Goche remarked in an interview with the ZBC "The Americans would have nothing to do with us as of 1993, the Germans were indifferent and distant, they acted like we were bothering them. The French were downright snotty about it. They (the French) were the only ones who were actually just disrespectul towards us as individuals. The only help we got was from the British. They were real friends about it. Every time Major told me he would do something he did it." In conjunction with Stan Mudenge and Nicholas Goche, the United Kingdom administration of John Major channeled large amounts of foreign direct investment into Zimbabwe to help revive Zimbabwe's economy. The investment was targeted to specific areas of the economy. As a result of this the size of the Zimbabwe's GDP grew from $6.891 billion in late 1994 to $8.53 billion (USD) by early 1997.

== 1995 Parliamentary Election ==
In 1995 Goche ran for Parliament to be the MP for Shamva. His opponent was Godfrey Mumbamarwo of the ZANU-PF Ndonga faction. Goche won the election 27,330 to 1,461 (94.9% of the vote for Goche, 5.1% of the vote for Mumbamarwo.)

== Minister of Transport ==
Minister of Transport and Infrastructure Development. He served during the tenure of Robert Mugabe who replaced him in 2014 with Prisca Mupfumira after he was accused of trying to kill the President as part of a coup.

== Biography ==
- Secretary-general, Rhodesian Explosive and Chemical Workers Union, 1968–70;
- Assistant personnel officer, payroll employees and welfare, Zimbabwe Phosphate Industries Ltd, 1970–74;
- Personnel officer, ZIMPHOS, 1974–77;
- Exile, 1977–80; Senior administrative officer, Zimbabwean Embassy, Washington, 1980–83;
- Under-Secretary, Eastern Europe, Asia and the Pacific, Ministry of Foreign Affairs, 1984;
- Ambassador, Romania and Bulgaria, 1984–87;
- Ambassador, People's Republic of China, 1987–90;
- Deputy Secretary, Political and Economic Affairs, Minister of Foreign Affairs, 1990–91;
- Assistant, Embassy in New York, 1991–92;
- Deputy Secretary for Production, ZANU-PF Mashonaland Central, 1994;
- Deputy Minister, Foreign Affairs, 1995–00;
- Minister of State, National Security, 2000–05;
- Minister of Public Service, Labour and Social Welfare, 2005–09;
- Minister of Transport, 2008 to 2013.

Goche was one of the negotiating team behind the unity government and helped maintain Mugabe in power while, as a former head of the Central Intelligence Organisation, he served as Minister of State for National Security. Since 2003, he is placed on European Union and United States sanctions lists.

Goche was the ZANU-PF candidate for the House of Assembly seat from Shamva North constituency in the March 2008 parliamentary election. He won by an overwhelming margin, receiving 10,385 votes against two MDC opponents, Chimombe Godfree and Matibiri Anderson, who respectively received 1,354 and 1,173 votes.

Along with Goche, Chinamasa was one of the negotiators sent by ZANU-PF to the talks between political parties that began in Pretoria on 10 July 2008, following the disputed re-election of President Robert Mugabe.

When the ZANU-PF–MDC national unity government was sworn in on 13 February 2009, Goche was moved to the position of Minister of Transport. As a result of a dispute between Nelson Chamisa, the Minister of Information and Communication Technology, and Webster Shamu, the Minister of Information and Publicity, regarding which ministry should deal with telecommunications, The Herald reported on 10 April 2009, that President Mugabe had assigned responsibility for telecommunications to Goche's ministry.
