= Willard Chiwewe =

Zimbabwean politician

The Right Honourable Willard Chiwewe

Provincial Governor of Masvingo
- Incumbent
- Assumed office 13 February 2009
- President: Robert Mugabe
- Prime Minister: Morgan Tsvangirai

Personal details
- Party: ZANU-PF

Willard Chiwewe is the Provincial Governor and resident minister of Masvingo, Zimbabwe. He is a member of the ZANU-PF party and an ex officio member of the Senate of Zimbabwe. He was placed on the European Union and United States sanctions lists in 2003.
