= David Karimanzira =

Zimbabwean politician and cabinet minister

David Ishemunyoro Godi Karimanzira (25 May 1947 - 24 March 2011) was a Zimbabwean politician and cabinet minister.

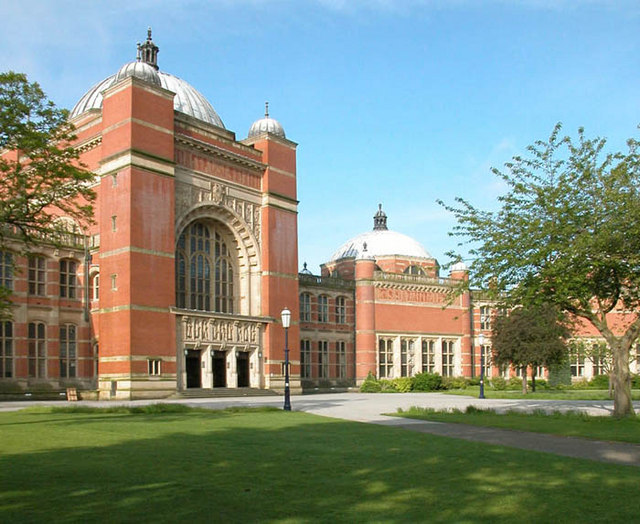
Birmingham University

== Background ==
David Karimanzira studied for a BA degree at the University of Rhodesia from 1971 to 1973. He studied for a PGCE and a master's degree in educational administration at Oxford University from 1974 to 1976. Karimanzira graduated from Birmingham University with an MEd degree in Educational Psychology in 1978.

Karimanzira was Zimbabwe's Minister of Youth, Sport and Culture from 1985 to 1987, Minister of Lands, Agriculture and Rural Settlement from 1987 to 1990, Minister of Higher Education and Technology from 1990 to 1993, and Minister of Information, Post and Telecommunications from 1993 to 1997. Karimanzira was Resident Minister and Governor of Mashonaland East Province from 1997 to 2006. He was Governor of Harare Metropolitan Province from 2006 until his death in 2011. From 2003 until his death in 2011, he was placed on the United States sanctions list.
