= Aeneas Chigwedere =

Zimbabwean politician (1939–2021)

The Right Honourable Aeneas Chigwedere

Governor of Mashonaland East
- In office 25 August 2008 – 28 June 2013
- President: Robert Mugabe
- Prime Minister: Morgan Tsvangirai
- Preceded by: Ray Kaukonde
- Succeeded by: Simbaneuta Mudarikwa (as Minister of State)

Minister of Education, Sports, & Culture of Zimbabwe
- In office August 2001 – August 2008
- President: Robert Mugabe
- Succeeded by: David Coltart

Personal details
- Born: 25 November 1939 Southern Rhodesia
- Died: 22 January 2021 (aged 81) Mashonaland East, Zimbabwe
- Cause of death: COVID-19
- Party: ZANU–PF

Aeneas Soko Chigwedere (25 November 1939 – 22 January 2021) was a Zimbabwean politician, historian, educationist, and traditional leader. He served as the Minister of Education, Sports, & Culture since August 2001, and was appointed the Resident Minister and Governor of Mashonaland East Province in August 2008. He was installed as Headman Svosve Mubayiwa on 10 March 2008. On 22 January 2021, he died at his farm near Marondera following COVID-19 related complications during the COVID-19 pandemic in Zimbabwe.

== Early life ==
Chigwedere was born in Hwedza district, Zimbabwe. His father was a teacher and had worked as a foreman at a commercial farm, and his mother was a communal farmer. His grandfather was the Chief of the area representing one of the senior houses of the Svosve dynasty. He was schooled at Chigwedere School, Chemhanza Mission, and Waddilove Institute before going to Goromonzi High School.

== Zimbabwean and African history ==
Chigwedere enrolled at the University of London, College of Rhodesia and Nyasaland, in 1962 as one of the 25 African students accepted then from Zimbabwe, Zambia and Malawi. As the first black student to be admitted to study for the History Honors program, from which he graduated in 1964, he strongly felt that he had a duty to work in producing an authentic history of Zimbabwe. He embarked on studying Chimurenga, the 1896–97 anticolonial war, in 1966 towards an MPhil degree. His main theme, contrary to colonial historians who had presented the war as a disjointed response to the 1890 colonisation, was that the war was a coordinated national traditional war: it was inspired by Murenga (the spirit at the Matopos) assisted by Mkwati, Kaguvi, Nehanda and Mbonga, all national Shona spirits; the fighting was led by chiefs with the Rozvis, the last national rulers, taking the command; the aim was to restore Shona sovereignty and Mudzinganyama had been selected to be installed as the national Rozvi chief in 1897; and the Shona targeted all foreign elements. Accordingly, Chigwedere argued that without painstakingly studying the organisation of traditional Shona society and unravelling who Murenga and Nehanda were, or what the Rozvi kingdom was, no meaningful exposition of the war could be made. His main contribution has been to unravelling both the substance and methods of studying precolonial Zimbabwean and African History.

His book From Mutapa to Rhodes (Macmillan 1980) gives the chronology of the precolonial history of Zimbabwe showing how the numerous clans and dynasties in Zimbabwe have a common ancestry, hence common national religious guardians. In addition to archival documents (on early oral tradition), the book reconstructs the history from extensive oral traditions, totemic history and praise poetry, traditional religion and its hierarchies, and traditional praise and war songs. Birth of Bantu Africa (Books for Africa 1982) pushes the thread back and demonstrates that most of the tribes in Southern Africa have common and traceable origins. The Karanga Empire (Books for Africa 1985) analyses in detail the origins, migrations, growth and segmentation of the Tongas and Kalangas.

=== Other works ===
- Lobola: Pros and Cons (Books For Africa 1982);
- The Forgotten Heroes of Chimurenga I (Mercury Press 1991);
- The Abandoned Adolescents (Mutapa 1996);
- British Betrayal of the Africans: Land, Cattle and Human Rights (Mutapa 2002).

He has authored a series of four textbooks, Dynamics of History I – IV (College Press), in use by Zimbabwe's high schools. He has written and presented numerous papers, conducted several history programs on national radio and television, and the most recent is being broadcast on Zimbabwe television weekly. However some of the books Chigwedere wrote some schools have banned them as some academics claim that they have distorted history

== Education ==
Chigwedere joined the Ministry of Education as a high school teacher in 1965 and completed his graduate certificate in education in 1975. He taught briefly at Fletcher and Highfield, but spent most of his teaching career at Goromonzi High School where he rose to become the first black headmaster and principal from 1977 to 1986. Because Goromonzi was the oldest government school, and earlier on, the only school offering advanced level to blacks, Chigwedere's service at the school enabled him to teach and groom many of the persons who later became ministers, parliamentarians, business leaders in Zimbabwe. A short list of his students include his cabinet colleagues Charles Utete, Patrick Chinamasa, Simbarashe Mumbengegwi, Witness Mangwende, July Moyo, Simon Khaya Moyo, and other notables such as author Thompson Tsodzo, clerk of parliament Austin Zvoma, opposition leader Tendai Biti Group CEO For Logistixware Jaweet Mahachi, cardiologist Jonathan Matenga, journalist Geoffrey Nyarota, and pioneer lawyers Chirunda and Chihambakwe.

Chigwedere was one of the founding members of the National Association of Secondary School Headmasters, served as the first Regional Chair for all Mashonaland and then National Chair up to 1986, and was elected a life member. He also served for a long time on the board of the National Museums and Monuments, chaired the board from 1984 to 1988, and in recognition of his service and studies, was awarded a special service certificate and honorary life membership. From 1987 to 1995, Chigwedere served as Deputy and then Regional Director of Education in the Ministry of Education, and retired early to pursue politics.

== Politics ==
Chigwedere first joined ZANU in 1964 while at university. In 1985, he became Education Secretary for ZANU's Chaminuka District in Goromonzi. In 1993, he rose through the ZANU Marondera (and Wedza) structures from ward level to Secretary of Education for Mashonaland East Province. He contested and won the Wedza parliamentary seat in 1995 with the fourth largest vote count nationally. Among those he had beaten in the primaries was Chenjerai Hunzvi, leader of the war veterans association. He was re-elected to parliament in 2000 and 2005, and in 2008 became a non-constituency senator.

In 1996, he was appointed to chair the ZANU PF commission on education reform, and in 1999 became the Secretary for Administration in Mashonaland East. He was appointed Deputy Minister of Education in July 2000, and in August 2001, Chigwedere became the Minister of Education, Sport and Culture, Zimbabwe's largest ministry both in budget allocation and manpower. His mandate has been to redirect education curricula to suit Zimbabwe's current needs, to integrate culture and mainstream education, and restructure sporting organisations into sustainable accountable professional associations. With large-scale population movements that came with land redistribution, a big part of the Ministry's work has been establishing and reorganising schools in the new farming communities.

From 2003 to 2016, Chigwedere was placed on the United States sanctions list.

Following the March 2008 parliamentary election, Chigwedere was appointed Resident Minister and Governor of Mashonaland East Province by President Robert Mugabe on 25 August 2008; in this capacity, he also served as a Senator. He has also been retained as acting Minister of Education, Sport and Culture.

== Traditional chief ==
Chigwedere descended from one of the senior houses of the Svosve Chieftainship, which has retained its direct connection to the Mutapas that were the national rulers. The Svosve Chieftainship covers the territory traditionally defined by all tributaries that flow into Ruzawi River, down to the Save River – this covers all Marondera and Wedza with Rusike, Mangwende and Makoni to the East, Seke, Chihota and Nenguwo to the North and West, and Nyashanu and the Njanja chiefs to the South. The House of Mubayiwa, which Chigwedere represented, was entrusted with ruling and safekeeping of all the territory encompassing the Wedza mountain and what was referred to as 'kumatirikoti'. Today that territory includes the five wards stretching from the Save river to the south, through Wedza mountain to Marondera along the Watershed road, including repossessed commercial farmland. After being anointed as the successor in 1973 when the last chief was installed, Chigwedere officially took over the reins in March 2008 at a grand ceremony where he received the royal traditional regalia and sacred items entrusted to the chief. He has appointed a council to rule for the duration that he still has political office.

== Controversy ==
Chigwedere attracted controversy and criticism as minister for once suggesting that all students should wear one uniform, for attempting to rename schools that still bear colonial names, and for pushing an act that empowers him to regulate the fees charged by government and private schools. He claimed some of his suggestions have been attempts to dampen the effects of hyperinflation on the education system.

Chigwedere once upheld a primary school headmaster's decision to expel a 7-year old Rastafarian boy because he felt that the boy's dreadlocks did not conform to the school dress. The decision was overturned by the Supreme Court. Chigwedere also had a TV Program Madzinza e Zimbabwe which traced the lineages of the Zimbabwean clans. The problem came when some historians and academics mostly white academics in the early 2000s who viewed Chigwedere as an academic outcast. He was criticised by scholars from the department of history at the University of Zimbabwe such as David Beach and Terence Ranger for reportedly flawed theories. At one point in time, he attracted attention when he quoted a spirit medium in his academic presentation.
