= Flora Buka =

Zimbabwean politician (born 1968)

Flora Buka (born 1968) is a Zimbabwean politician and Minister of State for Special Affairs Responsible for Land and Resettlement Programme. She was ZANU-PF's candidate for Gokwe-Nembudziya constituency in the March 2008 parliamentary election; she won the seat, receiving 8,650 votes and defeating two challengers from the Movement for Democratic Change: Kizito Chindende (MDC-T), who received 5,396 votes, and Josphat Mahachi (MDC-M), who received 1,071 votes. She is serving as Minister of State in the Office of Vice-President Joseph Msika. Since 2003, she is placed on the United States sanctions list.
