= Webster Shamu =

Zimbabwean politician (born 1945)

The Right Honourable Webster Kotiwani Shamu MP

Minister of Mashonaland West Provincial Affairs
- In office 9 October 2017 – 27 November 2017
- President: Robert Mugabe
- Preceded by: Faber Chidarikire

Minister of Media, Information and Publicity
- In office 13 February 2009 – 21 December 2014
- President: Robert Mugabe
- Prime Minister: Morgan Tsvangirai

Minister of State for Policy Implementation
- In office February 2004 – 13 February 2009
- President: Robert Mugabe

Member of the Zimbabwean Parliament for Chegutu
- Incumbent
- Assumed office 2000

Personal details
- Born: Charles Ndlovu; 6 June 1945 (age 81) Southern Rhodesia
- Party: ZANU-PF

Webster Kotiwani Shamu is a Zimbabwean politician and former Minister of Mashonaland West Provincial Affairs who was fired by President Emmerson Mnangagwa on 21 May 2018. He previously served as Minister of Information and Publicity, and as Minister of State for Policy Implementation. He is a member of parliament representing the Chegutu constituency. The Cabinet of Zimbabwe was later dissolved on 27 November 2017.

== Background ==
Webster Shamu has also been known as Charles Ndlovu, having changed his name during the civil war (1972–1980), as did many others who used pseudonyms to mask their identities. Shamu, previously a freelance broadcaster under the Smith regime and a well-known presenter to thousands on Radio Harare as the voice behind "The Lyons Maid Hit Parade", escaped from British South Africa Police attention for suspected or alleged crimes, crossed the border into Mozambique where he became again a well known voice to African listeners, broadcasting back from Maputo as the "Voice of Zimbabwe".

Radio DJ Webster Shamu Interviewing Indigenous Business Magnates Paul Tangi Mhova Mkondo and Isaac Hanzi Samuriwo

He was appointed as Minister of State for Policy Implementation on 9 February 2004.

Shamu, as Minister of State for Policy Implementation, presented President Robert Mugabe with a present of a nile crocodile, to be part of the museum being built for the president.

Shamu is among a host of individuals not allowed to travel to the United States because the US government feels he has worked to undermine democracy in Zimbabwe.

He has business interests in common with Charles Davy, the father of Chelsy Davy, the former girlfriend of Prince Harry, through Davy's HHK Safaris, which incorporates Shamu's Famba Safaris. HHK Safaris and Shamu were investigated for illegal ivory trading in 2007.

== Political career ==
He was the editor of the ZANU-PF weekly news publication, the People's Voice, until he stepped down in 2004 to take up his post as the Minister of Policy Implementation in the President's office.

=== 2000 parliamentary election ===
Shamu controversially won the Chegutu constituency in 2000 parliamentary election. His adversary in the election, Philemon Matibe, who ran on an MDC ticket, was one of the few black commercial farmers to lose a farm after the elections, to a mob purportedly hired by Shamu.

=== Minister of Industry and International Trade ===
Shamu has appeared at the forefront praising the work of Gideon Gono to revive the economy of the country, although all these efforts appear to have been in vain. He was placed on the United States sanctions list in 2005.

=== 2008 parliamentary election ===
Shamu was nominated by ZANU-PF as its candidate for the House of Assembly seat from Chegutu East constituency in the March 2008 parliamentary election. According to official results, he easily won the seat, receiving 9,222 votes against 2,724 for the candidate of the MDC faction led by Morgan Tsvangirai and 1,218 votes for the candidate of the MDC faction led by Arthur Mutambara.

=== Unity government ===
When the ZANU-PF–MDC national unity government was sworn in on 13 February 2009, Shamu became Minister of Information and Publicity. After taking office, he fell into a dispute with Nelson Chamisa, the Minister of Information Communication Technology, regarding which ministry should deal with telecommunications. The Herald reported on 10 April 2009, that President Mugabe had assigned responsibility for telecommunications to the Ministry of Transport, headed by Nicholas Goche.

=== 2014 ousting ===
He was removed from his party position as ZANU-PF national political commissar and lost his central committee membership after being accused of being sympathetic to the then suspended Joice Mujuru and her presumed loyalists. He was also suspended from the party and removed from his ministerial position.

=== 2017 Zimbabwe coup d'etat ===
On 27 November 2017, Emmerson Mnangagwa, who succeeded ousted President Robert Mugabe following the 2017 Zimbabwe coup d'etat, announced the dissolution of the Zimbabwe Cabinet, leaving only Patrick Chinamasa and Simbarashe Mumbengegwi as acting ministers of Finance and Foreign Affairs respectively.

=== Return to ZANU-PF ===
Shamu was re-appointed as a central committee member at the December 2016 ZANU-PF annual conference. He was then restored to the cabinet in a reshuffle on 9 October 2017, appointed as the Mashonaland West Provincial Affairs minister. Shamu was fired by President Emmerson Mnagangwa on 21 May 2018. No reasons were given for his sudden expulsion which was with immediate effect. Prior to him being sacked, he had been in the eye of a storm after he was found with ballots marked in his name, which was used in the Zanu PF primary elections which held in April 2018.

== See also ==
- Obert Mpofu
- Robert Mugabe
- ZANU-PF
