= Thokozile Mathuthu =

Zimbabwean politician

- Born: Zimbabwe
- Occupation: Politician

Thokozile Angela Mathuthu was a Zimbabwean politician. She was a member of the Zimbabwe African National Union-Patriotic Front. Mathuthu was the former Minister of State in Matabeleland North. She was appointed in 2017 following cabinet reshuffle and was also the member of Senate for Matabeleland North and former Deputy Minister of Information, Media and Broadcasting Services. In 2018, she died of cancer.
