= Elliot Manyika =

Zimbabwean politician (1955–2008)

Elliot Tapfumaneyi Manyika (30 July 1955 – 6 December 2008) was a Zimbabwean politician, musician, who served as Minister without Portfolio and the National political Commissar for ZANU-PF.

Born at Rosa Clinic in Chiweshe, Manyika did his primary education at Madombwe and Bare schools. After completing Standard Six at Bare, he attended Kutama College. In 1974, he was arrested for allegedly writing and circulating subversive statements while waiting for his O-level results. He was sentenced to five years in prison, but was released after 18 months under strict conditions. As a result of the incarceration, he could not proceed for Advanced level.

After Zimbabwe gained independence from Great Britain, Manyika sat for examinations, during which time he also obtained diplomas in Accounts and Business from the London Chamber of Commerce and Industry. He later studied for a master's degree in International Policy Studies with the University of Bristol in Britain.

Manyika joined the Zanu-PF Youth League together with the late Minister of Youth, Gender and Employment Creation, Border Gezi, in 1982. He rose through the ranks, becoming the youngest provincial secretary for administration in 1986.

He also worked in different capacities in the government, including that of under-secretary in the President's Office. He worked for the then ministries of Local Government and National Housing and Women's Affairs.

He was Minister of Youth Development, Gender and Employment Creation before being appointed as Minister without Portfolio on 9 February 2004.

Manyika died in a road accident on 6 December 2008, aged 53, while he was traveling to Gwanda. Days after the accident, Manyika was declared a national hero by the Politburo. From 2003 until his death, Manyika was placed on the European Union and United States sanctions lists.
