= Chris Mushohwe =

Zimbabwean politician (1954–2023)

Christopher Chindoti Mushohwe (6 February 1954 – 13 February 2023) was a Zimbabwean politician. He held several posts, including minister of information and broadcasting services.

== Political career ==
Mushohwe was the ZANU-PF candidate for the Mutare West constituency in the March 2008 parliamentary election, but was very narrowly defeated according to the official results. He received 7,577 votes, 20 less than the total number of votes received by Movement for Democratic Change candidate Shuah Mudiwa. Mushohwe was subsequently appointed resident minister and governor of Manicaland Province by President Robert Mugabe on 25 August 2008. In this capacity, he also served as a senator. Mushohwe was a member of the Selous Scouts. He remained in the President's office after Muzorewa because Mugabe wanted someone who knew top secrets of Muzorewa. He was criticised for taking the Kondozi farm which was contributing a lot to Zimbabwe GDP and employment. He was suspected to have caused the death of many within ZANU-PF. He was also the minister of information and broadcasting services in Zimbabwe until October 2017, when Simon Khaya-Moyo was appointed his successor. Then Mushohwe was named as the minister of state in the President's Office responsible for scholarships, a new ministry. He retained the ministry under the cabinet of the new president Emmerson Mnangagwa.

Mushohwe was put on the United States sanctions list in 2003.

== Death ==
Mushohwe died on the 13 February 2023, at the age of 69.
