= Rugare Gumbo =

Zimbabwean politician (born 1940)

Politician Rugare Gumbo
- In office January 2015 – current

Personal details
- Born: 8 March 1940 (age 86) Mberengwa, Rhodesia and Nyasaland
- Spouse: Fay Chung
- Children: Chipo Chung
- Occupation: Politician

Rugare Eleck Ngidi Gumbo (born 8 March 1940) is a Zimbabwean politician. He is a former Minister of Economic Development in the Zimbabwean government during the administration of Robert Mugabe.

== Early background ==
He grew up in colonial in Belingwe district (renamed Mberengwa after independence) district of Rhodesia on 8 March 1940, and was educated at a government secondary school. From his early teens he was involved in nationalist politics, and at the age of 22 was a branch chairman of the Fort Victoria (now Masvingo) ZAPU party under Joshua Nkomo.

== Political career ==
Gumbo was appointed as Minister of Economic Development in April 2005, following the March 2005 parliamentary election; this appointment involved splitting a new Ministry of Economic Development from the old Ministry of Finance and Economic Development. In this position, Gumbo launched the National Economic Development Priority Programme (NEDPP) on 19 April 2006, in an attempt to revive Zimbabwe's struggling economy within six to nine months. He was appointed as Minister of Agriculture in February 2007.

The Herald reported 3 January 2009, that Gumbo had been dismissed from the Cabinet earlier in the week, along with 11 other ministers, because he no longer held any seat in Parliament.

Gumbo was suspended from ZANU PF for 5 years with immediate effect on Thursday 14 November 2014. A few weeks later he was expelled from ZANU PF. Thereafter many more politicians who were said to be aligned to former Vice President Joyce Mujuru were to also be suspended and expelled. Gumbo is a founding member and elder of a political party formed in 2015, called Zimbabwe People First (ZimPF), which disbanded after differences with Mujuru.

Since 2003, Gumbo has been on the United States sanctions list, and from the following year also on the European Union sanctions list.
