= Faber Chidarikire =

Zimbabwean politician

The Right Honourable Faber Edmond Chidarikire

Provincial Governor of Mashonaland West
- Incumbent
- Assumed office 13 February 2009
- President: Robert Mugabe
- Prime Minister: Morgan Tsvangirai
- Preceded by: Nelson Samukange

Personal details
- Party: Zimbabwe African National Union – Patriotic Front

Faber Edmond Chidarikire was the Provincial Governor and resident minister of Mashonaland West, Zimbabwe. He was a member of the ZANU-PF party and an ex officio member of the Senate of Zimbabwe.

== Political career ==
Faber Edmond Chidarikire's political career began in 1994 when he was elected executive mayor of Chinhoyi. He held this office for 4 years before stepping down.

Faber Chidarikire decided to go back to politics and in 2004 he was elected member of parliament for Chinhoyi. He held this office until 13 February 2009 when he was appointed Governor and Resident Minister of Mashonaland West Province.
