= Government of National Unity (Zimbabwe) =

Zimbabwe Government of National Unity 2009 - 2013

- Cabinet of Zimbabwe
- 2009–2013
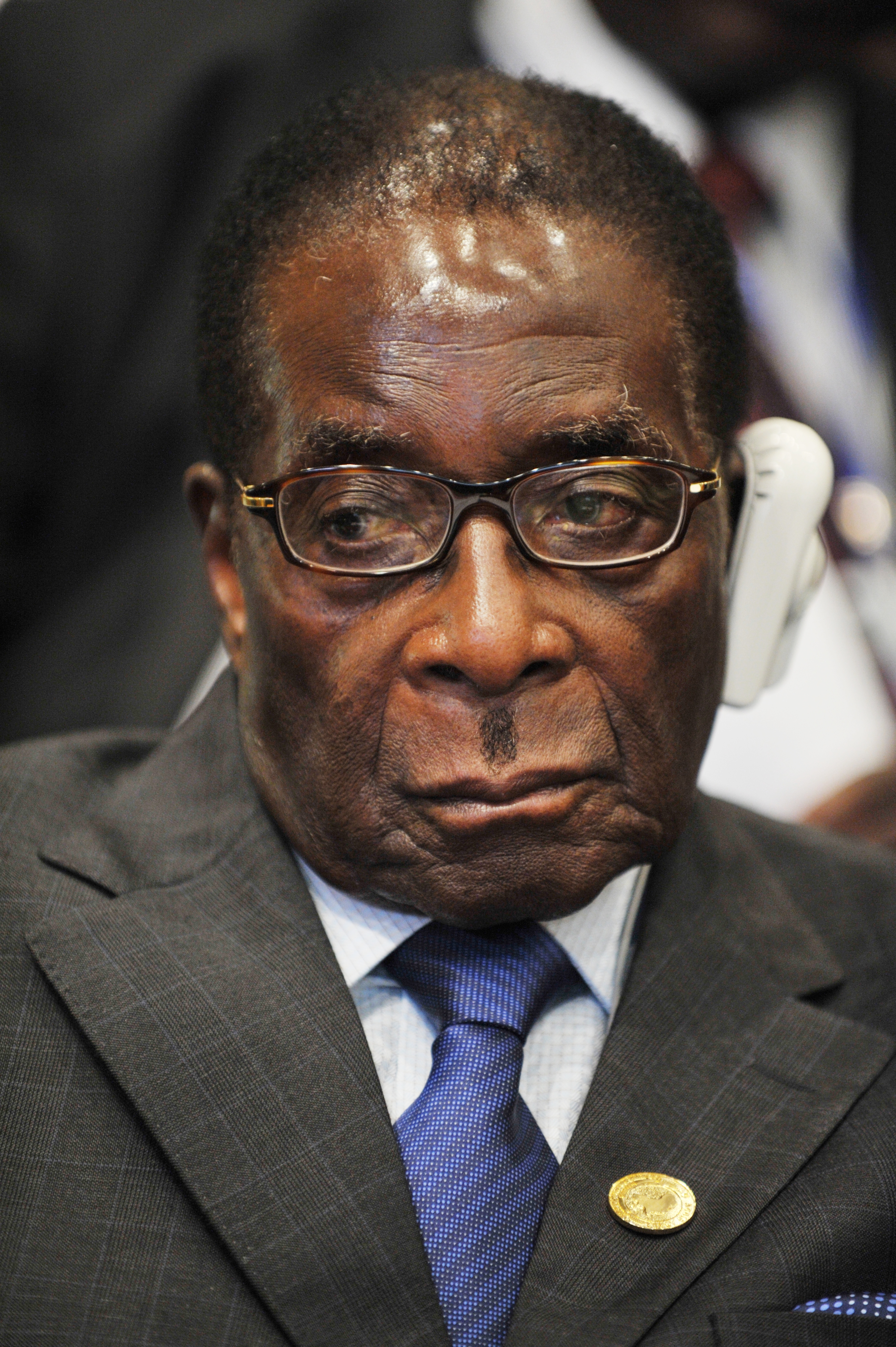
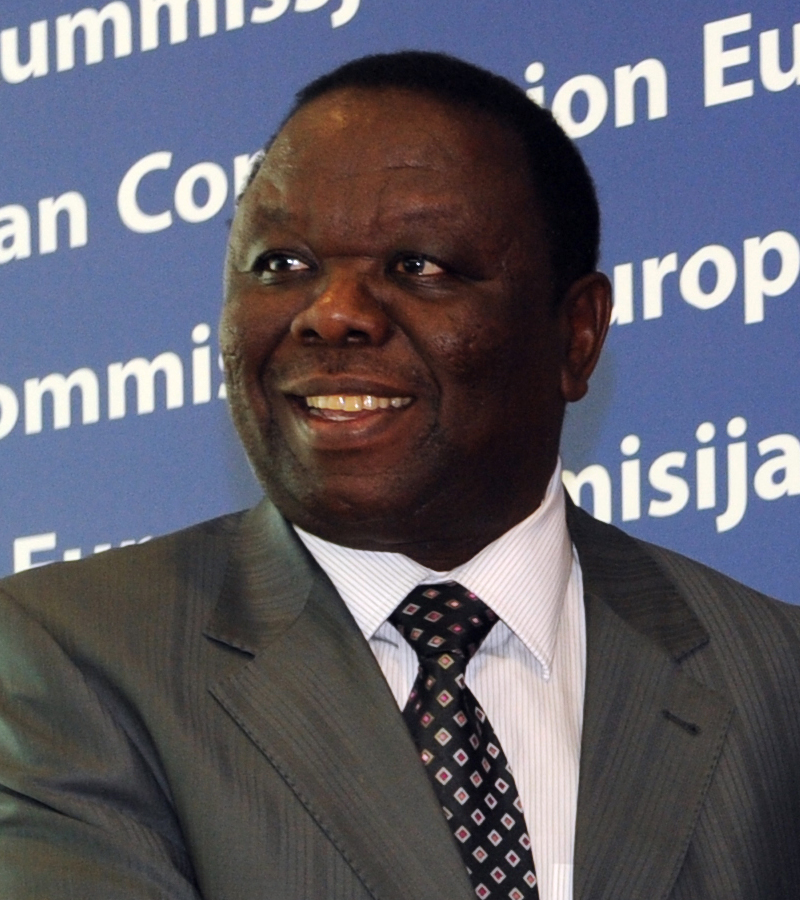
- President Robert Mugabe (left) and Prime Minister Morgan Tsvangirai (right)
- Date formed: 11 February 2009
- Date dissolved: 22 August 2013

People and organisations
- President: Robert Mugabe
- First Vice-President: Joice Mujuru
- Second Vice-President: Joseph Msika (2009†); John Nkomo (2009-2013†)
- Prime Minister: Morgan Tsvangirai
- Deputy Prime Ministers: Thokozani Khuphe; Arthur Mutambara
- Chief Secretary to the President and Cabinet: Misheck Sibanda
- Member party: ZANU-PF; MDC-T; MDC-M
- Status in legislature: Coalition

History
- Incoming formation: 2008–2009 Zimbabwean political negotiations
- Election: 29 March 2008
- Legislature term: 7th Parliament
- Predecessor: Zimbabwe Temporary Cabinet of 2009
- Successor: Eighth Cabinet of Robert Mugabe

The Government of National Unity was the coalition government of Zimbabwe formed following the signing of the Global Political Agreement, which took effect on 11 February 2009. The discussions followed the 2008 general election, which had seen widespread violence and intimidation, and the MDC-T win a majority of seats in Parliament. President Robert Mugabe remained in office as President, while Morgan Tsvangirai was appointed Prime Minister - a post which had been abolished in 1987. The new ministers were sworn in on 11 February 2009, while deputies were sworn in on 20 February 2009.

== History ==
The GNU was established under the Constitution of Zimbabwe Amendment (No. 19) Act, 2009, enacted on 13 February 2009. This amendment modified the executive structure to create the office of prime minister and allocate powers between the president, prime minister, and cabinet. It also required that ministers be members of Parliament, either in the House of Assembly or Senate, to ensure accountability to the legislature.

This constitutional requirement led to the removal of Gibson Sibanda, a senior MDC–M figure initially appointed as Minister of State in the Deputy Prime Minister's office. Sibanda failed to secure a parliamentary seat in the 2008 elections and was not given one of the MDC-M appointed seats in Parliament, highlighting the strict application of the rule.

The GNU cabinet initially comprised 31 ministers (later adjusted in practice), with portfolios apportioned among the three parties to reflect their electoral strengths and the GPA terms. ZANU–PF received 15 ministries, including key portfolios such as Defence, Home Affairs (shared with MDC–T), Foreign Affairs, Justice, and Media. MDC–T held 13 ministries, including Finance, ICT, Health, and Energy. MDC–M received 3 ministries, such as Education, Industry and Commerce and Regional Integration.

The apportionment ensured representation but led to tensions over control of powerful ministries. Appointments were negotiated and announced by President Mugabe, with the prime minister chairing the Council of Ministers.

In June 2010, Prime Minister Tsvangirai reshuffled MDC–T ministers, replacing several in his party's portfolios, including those for Energy and Housing. This was the only internal reshuffle during the GNU.

The GNU ended following the 31 July 2013 general elections, in which ZANU–PF secured a two-thirds majority in parliament. The 2013 Constitution abolished the prime minister's office, restoring an executive presidency. Under the Constitution, Cabinet ministers retained their posts even after the dissolution of Parliament, until the newly elected President was sworn in, which occurred when Mugabe was sworn in on 22 August 2013. The period saw economic stabilisation through dollarisation and growth averaging around 10% annually, though political tensions persisted.

== Cabinets ==
=== 11 February 2009 – 23 June 2010 ===
First Cabinet of the GNU
| Portfolio | Portrait | Party | Minister | Term |
|---|---|---|---|---|
Cabinet ministers
| President of Zimbabwe; Commander-in-Chief of the Zimbabwe Defence Forces | | ZANU-PF | His Excellency President Robert Mugabe | 1987 – 2017 |
| First Vice-President of Zimbabwe | | ZANU-PF | Hon. Joice Mujuru | 2004 – 2014 |
| Second Vice-President of Zimbabwe | | ZANU-PF | Hon. Joseph Msika | 1999 – 2009† |
| Second Vice-President of Zimbabwe | | ZANU-PF | Hon. John Nkomo | 2009 – 2013† |
| Prime Minister | | MDC-T | Hon. Morgan Tsvangirai | 2009 – 2013 |
| Deputy Prime Minister | | MDC-T | Hon. Thokozani Khupe | 2009 – 2013 |
| Deputy Prime Minister | | MDC-M | Hon. Arthur Mutambara | 2009 – 2013 |
| Minister of Agriculture, Mechanisation and Irrigation | | ZANU-PF | Hon. Joseph Made | 2009 – 2017 |
| Minister of Constitutional and Parliamentary Affairs | | MDC-T | Hon. Eric Matinenga | 2009 – 2013 |
| Minister of Defence | | ZANU-PF | Hon. Emmerson Mnangagwa | 2009 – 2013 |
| Minister of Economic Planning and Investment Promotion | | MDC-T | Hon. Elton Mangoma | 2009 – 2010 |
| Minister of Education, Sport, Art and Culture | | MDC-M | Hon. David Coltart | 2009 – 2013 |
| Minister of Energy and Power Development | | MDC-T | Hon. Elias Mudzuri | 2009 – 2010 |
| Minister of Environment and Natural Resources Management | | ZANU-PF | Hon. Francis Nhema | 2009 – 2013 |
| Minister of Finance | | MDC-T | Hon. Tendai Biti | 2009 – 2013 |
| Minister of Foreign Affairs | | ZANU-PF | Hon. Simbarashe Mumbengegwi | 2005 – 2017 |
| Minister of Health and Child Welfare | | MDC-T | Hon. Henry Madzorera | 2009 – 2013 |
| Minister of Higher and Tertiary Education | | ZANU-PF | Hon. Stan Mudenge | 2009 – 2012† |
| Co-Minister of Home Affairs | | ZANU-PF | Hon. Kembo Mohadi | 2009 – 2015 |
| Co-Minister of Home Affairs | | MDC-T | Hon. Giles Mutsekwa | 2009 – 2010 |
| Minister of Housing and Social Amenities | | MDC-T | Hon. Fidelis Mhashu | 2009 – 2010 |
| Minister of Industry and Commerce | | MDC-M | Hon. Welshman Ncube | 2009 – 2013 |
| Minister of Information Communication Technology | | MDC-T | Hon. Nelson Chamisa | 2009 – 2013 |
| Minister of Justice and Legal Affairs | | ZANU-PF | Hon. Patrick Chinamasa | 2009 – 2013 |
| Minister of Labour and Social Welfare | | MDC-T | Hon. Paurina Gwanyanya | 2009 – 2013 |
| Minister of Lands and Rural Resettlement | | ZANU-PF | Hon. Herbert Murerwa | 2009 – 2013 |
| Minister of Local Government, Urban and Rural Development | | ZANU-PF | Hon. Ignatius Chombo | 2009 – 2015 |
| Minister of Media, Information and Publicity | | ZANU-PF | Hon. Webster Shamu | 2009 – 2013 |
| Minister of Mines and Mining Development | | ZANU-PF | Hon. Obert Mpofu | 2009 – 2013 |
| Minister of Public Service | | MDC-T | Hon. Eliphas Mukonoweshuro | 2009 – 2013 |
| Minister of Public Works | | MDC-T | Hon. Theresa Makone | 2009 – 2010 |
| Minister of Regional Integration and International Co-operation | | MDC-M | Hon. Priscilla Misihairabwi-Mushonga | 2009 – 2013 |
| Minister of Science and Technology | | MDC-T | Hon. Heneri Dzinotyiweyi | 2009 – 2013 |
| Minister of Small and Medium Enterprises and Co-operative Development | | ZANU-PF | Hon. Sithembiso Nyoni | 2009 – 2017 |
| Minister of State Enterprises and Parastatals | | MDC-T | Hon. Joel Gabuza Gabbuza | 2009 – 2010 |
| Minister of Tourism and Hospitality Industry | | ZANU-PF | Hon. Walter Mzembi | 2009 – 2017 |
| Minister of Transport and Infrastructural Development | | ZANU-PF | Hon. Nicholas Goche | 2009 – 2013 |
| Minister of Water Resources and Development | | MDC-T | Hon. Samuel Sipepa Nkomo | 2009 – 2013 |
| Minister of Women's Affairs, Gender and Community Development | | ZANU-PF | Hon. Olivia Muchena | 2009 – 2013 |
| Minister of Youth Development, Indigenisation and Empowerment | | ZANU-PF | Hon. Saviour Kasukuwere | 2009 – 2013 |

=== 23 June 2010 – 22 August 2013 ===
Second Cabinet of the GNU
| Portfolio | Portrait | Party | Minister | Term |
|---|---|---|---|---|
Cabinet ministers
| President of Zimbabwe; Commander-in-Chief of the Zimbabwe Defence Forces | | ZANU-PF | His Excellency President Robert Mugabe | 1987 – 2017 |
| First Vice-President of Zimbabwe | | ZANU-PF | Hon. Joice Mujuru | 2004 – 2014 |
| Second Vice-President of Zimbabwe | | ZANU-PF | Hon. John Nkomo | 2009 – 2013† |
| Prime Minister | | MDC-T | Hon. Morgan Tsvangirai | 2009 – 2013 |
| Deputy Prime Minister | | MDC-T | Hon. Thokozani Khupe | 2009 – 2013 |
| Deputy Prime Minister | | MDC-M | Hon. Arthur Mutambara | 2009 – 2013 |
| Minister of Agriculture, Mechanisation and Irrigation | | ZANU-PF | Hon. Joseph Made | 2009 – 2017 |
| Minister of Constitutional and Parliamentary Affairs | | MDC-T | Hon. Eric Matinenga | 2009 – 2013 |
| Minister of Defence | | ZANU-PF | Hon. Emmerson Mnangagwa | 2009 – 2013 |
| Minister of Economic Planning and Investment Promotion | | MDC-T | Hon. Tapiwa Mashakada | 2010 – 2013 |
| Minister of Education, Sport, Art and Culture | | MDC-M | Hon. David Coltart | 2009 – 2013 |
| Minister of Energy and Power Development | | MDC-T | Hon. Elton Mangoma | 2010 – 2013 |
| Minister of Environment and Natural Resources Management | | ZANU-PF | Hon. Francis Nhema | 2009 – 2013 |
| Minister of Finance | | MDC-T | Hon. Tendai Biti | 2009 – 2013 |
| Minister of Foreign Affairs | | ZANU-PF | Hon. Simbarashe Mumbengegwi | 2005 – 2017 |
| Minister of Health and Child Welfare | | MDC-T | Hon. Henry Madzorera | 2009 – 2013 |
| Minister of Higher and Tertiary Education | | ZANU-PF | Hon. Stan Mudenge | 2009 – 2012† |
| Co-Minister of Home Affairs | | ZANU-PF | Hon. Kembo Mohadi | 2009 – 2015 |
| Co-Minister of Home Affairs | | MDC-T | Hon. Theresa Makone | 2010 – 2013 |
| Minister of Housing and Social Amenities | | MDC-T | Hon. Giles Mutsekwa | 2010 – 2013 |
| Minister of Industry and Commerce | | MDC-M | Hon. Welshman Ncube | 2009 – 2013 |
| Minister of Information Communication Technology | | MDC-T | Hon. Nelson Chamisa | 2009 – 2013 |
| Minister of Justice and Legal Affairs | | ZANU-PF | Hon. Patrick Chinamasa | 2009 – 2013 |
| Minister of Labour and Social Welfare | | MDC-T | Hon. Paurina Gwanyanya | 2009 – 2013 |
| Minister of Lands and Rural Resettlement | | ZANU-PF | Hon. Herbert Murerwa | 2009 – 2013 |
| Minister of Local Government, Urban and Rural Development | | ZANU-PF | Hon. Ignatius Chombo | 2009 – 2015 |
| Minister of Media, Information and Publicity | | ZANU-PF | Hon. Webster Shamu | 2009 – 2013 |
| Minister of Mines and Mining Development | | ZANU-PF | Hon. Obert Mpofu | 2009 – 2013 |
| Minister of Public Service | | MDC-T | Hon. Eliphas Mukonoweshuro | 2009 – 2013 |
| Minister of Public Works | | MDC-T | Hon. Joel Gabuza Gabbuza | 2010 – 2013 |
| Minister of Regional Integration and International Co-operation | | MDC-M | Hon. Priscilla Misihairabwi-Mushonga | 2009 – 2013 |
| Minister of Science and Technology | | MDC-T | Hon. Heneri Dzinotyiweyi | 2009 – 2013 |
| Minister of Small and Medium Enterprises and Co-operative Development | | ZANU-PF | Hon. Sithembiso Nyoni | 2009 – 2017 |
| Minister of State Enterprises and Parastatals | | MDC-T | Hon. Gorden Moyo | 2010 – 2013 |
| Minister of Tourism and Hospitality Industry | | ZANU-PF | Hon. Walter Mzembi | 2009 – 2017 |
| Minister of Transport and Infrastructural Development | | ZANU-PF | Hon. Nicholas Goche | 2009 – 2013 |
| Minister of Water Resources and Development | | MDC-T | Hon. Samuel Sipepa Nkomo | 2009 – 2013 |
| Minister of Women's Affairs, Gender and Community Development | | ZANU-PF | Hon. Olivia Muchena | 2009 – 2013 |
| Minister of Youth Development, Indigenisation and Empowerment | | ZANU-PF | Hon. Saviour Kasukuwere | 2009 – 2013 |

== List of ministers ==
| ZANU-PF | MDC-T | MDC-M |
Cabinet ministers are listed **in bold** while deputies are not

=== The Office of the President and Cabinet (OPC) ===
The Office of the President and Cabinet
| Post | Minister | Term |
|---|---|---|
| President of Zimbabwe; Commander-in-Chief of the Zimbabwe Defence Forces | His Excellency President **Robert Mugabe** | 31 December 1987 – 21 November 2017 |
| First Vice-President of Zimbabwe | Hon. **Joice Mujuru** | 6 December 2004 – 8 December 2014 |
| Second Vice-President of Zimbabwe | Hon. **Joseph Msika** | 23 December 1999 – 4 August 2009† |
| Second Vice-President of Zimbabwe | Hon. **John Nkomo** | 13 December 2009 – 17 January 2013† |
| Chief Secretary to the President and Cabinet | Dr Misheck Sibanda | 5 May 2003 – 26 September 2023 |
| Minister of State for Presidential Affairs | Hon. Didymus Mutasa | 11 February 2009 – 22 August 2013 |
| Minister of State for National Security in the President’s Office | Hon. Sydney Sekeramayi | 11 February 2009 – 22 August 2013 |
| Minister of State in Vice President Mujuru’s Office | Hon. Sylvester Robert Nguni | 20 February 2009 – 22 December 2014 |
| Minister of State in Vice President Msika’s Office | Hon. Flora Buka | 20 February 2009 – 4 August 2009 |
| Minister of State in Vice President Nkomo’s Office | Hon. Flora Buka | 13 December 2009 – 17 January 2013 |
| Minister of State in the President's Office | Hon. John Nkomo | 20 February 2009 – 13 December 2009 |

=== The Office of the Prime Minister ===
The Office of the Prime Minister
| Prime Minister of Zimbabwe; Chair of the Council of Ministers; Deputy Chairperson of Cabinet | Hon. **Morgan Tsvangirai** | 11 February 2009 – 22 August 2013 |
| Deputy Prime Minister of Zimbabwe | Hon. **Thokozani Khupe** | 11 February 2009 – 22 August 2013 |
| Deputy Prime Minister of Zimbabwe | Hon. **Arthur Mutambara** | 11 February 2009 – 22 August 2013 |
| Minister of State in the Prime Minister's Office | Hon. Gorden Moyo | 11 February 2009 – 23 June 2010 |
| Minister of State in the Prime Minister's Office | Hon. Jameson Timba | 23 June 2010 – 22 August 2013 |
| Minister of State in Deputy Prime Minister Khupe’s Office | Hon. Sekai Masikana Holland | 20 February 2009 – 22 August 2013 |
| Minister of State in Deputy Prime Minister Mutambara’s Office | Hon. Gibson Sibanda | 20 February 2009 – 19 May 2009 (Note: In terms of the Constitution, no minister was permitted to hold office for longer than three months unless he is a member of Parliament. Sibanda was not given a seat in Parliament, and as such lost his post automatically after three months had passed.) |

=== Departments of state ===
Agriculture, Mechanisation and Irrigation
| Minister of Agriculture, Mechanisation and Irrigation | Hon. **Joseph Made** | 11 February 2009 – 21 November 2017 |
| Deputy Minister of Agriculture, Mechanisation and Irrigation | Hon. Roy Bennett | Never sworn in (Note: Roy Bennett was nominated by the MDC-T as Deputy Minister for Agriculture and was appointed a Senator as one of their four party-appointed seats. Bennett was sworn in as a Senator, however Mugabe refused to swear him in as a Deputy Minister during the course of the GNU, and several charges were brought against him, eventually forcing him to live in exile after September 2010.) |

Constitutional and Parliamentary Affairs
| Minister of Constitutional and Parliamentary Affairs | Hon. **Eric Matinenga** | 11 February 2009 – 22 August 2013 |

Defence
| Minister of Defence | Hon. **Emmerson Mnangagwa** | 11 February 2009 – 22 August 2013 |

Economic Planning and Investment Promotion
| Minister of Economic Planning and Investment Promotion | Hon. **Elton Mangoma** | 11 February 2009 – 23 June 2010 |
| Minister of Economic Planning and Investment Promotion | Hon. **Tapiwa Mashakada** | 23 June 2010 – 22 August 2013 |
| Deputy Minister of Economic Planning and Investment Promotion | Hon. Samuel Undenge | 20 February 2009 – 12 December 2014 |

Education, Sport, Art and Culture
| Minister of Education, Sport, Art and Culture | Hon. **David Coltart** | 11 February 2009 – 22 August 2013 |
| Deputy Minister of Education, Sport, Art and Culture | Hon. Lazarus Dokora | 20 February 2009 – 22 August 2013 |

Energy and Power Development
| Minister of Energy and Power Development | Hon. **Elias Mudzuri** | 11 February 2009 – 23 June 2010 |
| Minister of Energy and Power Development | Hon. **Elton Mangoma** | 23 June 2010 – 22 August 2013 |
| Deputy Minister of Energy and Power Development | Hon. Hubert Nyanhongo | 20 February 2009 – 22 August 2013 |

Environment and Natural Resources Management
| Minister of Environment and Natural Resources Management | Hon. **Francis Nhema** | 11 February 2009 – 22 August 2013 |

Finance
| Minister of Finance | Hon. **Tendai Biti** | 11 February 2009 – 22 August 2013 |

Foreign Affairs
| Minister of Foreign Affairs | Hon. **Simbarashe Mumbengegwi** | 15 April 2005 – 9 October 2017 |
| Deputy Minister of Foreign Affairs | Hon. Moses Mzila Ndlovu | 20 February 2009 – 22 August 2013 |

Health and Child Welfare
| Minister of Health and Child Welfare | Hon. **Henry Madzorera** | 11 February 2009 – 22 August 2013 |
| Deputy Minister of Health and Child Welfare | Hon. Douglas Tendai Mombeshora | 20 February 2009 – 22 August 2013 |

Higher and Tertiary Education
| Minister of Higher and Tertiary Education | Hon. **Stan Mudenge** | 11 February 2009 – 4 October 2012† |
| Deputy Minister of Higher and Tertiary Education | Hon. Lutho Addington Tapela | 20 February 2009 – 22 August 2013 |

Home Affairs
| Co-Ministers of Home Affairs | Hon. **Kembo Mohadi** | 11 February 2009 – 6 July 2015 |
| Co-Ministers of Home Affairs | Hon. **Giles Mutsekwa** | 11 February 2009 – 23 June 2010 |
| Co-Ministers of Home Affairs | Hon. **Theresa Makone** | 23 June 2010 – 22 August 2013 |

Housing and Social Amenities
| Minister of Housing and Social Amenities | Hon. **Fidelis Mhashu** | 11 February 2009 – 23 June 2010 |
| Minister of Housing and Social Amenities | Hon. **Giles Mutsekwa** | 23 June 2010 – 22 August 2013 |

Industry and Commerce
| Minister of Industry and Commerce | Hon. **Welshman Ncube** | 11 February 2009 – 22 August 2013 |
| Deputy Minister of Industry and Commerce | Hon. Michael Chakanaka Bimha | 20 February 2009 – 22 August 2013 |

Information Communication Technology
| Minister of Information Communication Technology | Hon. **Nelson Chamisa** | 11 February 2009 – 22 August 2013 |

Justice and Legal Affairs
| Minister of Justice and Legal Affairs | Hon. **Patrick Chinamasa** | 11 February 2009 – 22 August 2013 |
| Deputy Minister of Justice and Legal Affairs | Hon. Jessie Fungai Majome | 20 February 2009 – 23 June 2010 |
| Deputy Minister of Justice and Legal Affairs | Hon. Obert Gutu | 23 June 2010 – 22 August 2013 |

Labour and Social Welfare
| Minister of Labour and Social Welfare | Hon. **Paurina Gwanyanya** | 11 February 2009 – 22 August 2013 |
| Deputy Minister of Labour and Social Welfare | Hon. Tracy Mutinhiri | 20 February 2009 – 22 August 2013 |

Lands and Rural Resettlement
| Minister of Lands and Rural Resettlement | Hon. **Herbert Murerwa** | 11 February 2009 – 22 August 2013 |

Local Government, Urban and Rural Development
| Minister of Local Government, Urban and Rural Development | Hon. **Ignatius Chombo** | 11 February 2009 – 6 July 2015 |
| Deputy Minister of Local Government, Urban and Rural Development | Hon. Sesel Zvidzai | 20 February 2009 – 22 August 2013 |

Media, Information and Publicity
| Minister of Media, Information and Publicity | Hon. **Webster Shamu** | 11 February 2009 – 22 August 2013 |
| Deputy Minister of Media, Information and Publicity | Hon. Jameson Zvidzai Timba | 20 February 2009 – 23 June 2010 |
| Deputy Minister of Media, Information and Publicity | Hon. Murisi Zwizwai | 23 June 2010 – 22 August 2013 |

Mines and Mining Development
| Minister of Mines and Mining Development | Hon. **Obert Mpofu** | 11 February 2009 – 22 August 2013 |
| Deputy Minister of Mines and Mining Development | Hon. Murisi Zwizwai | 20 February 2009 – 23 June 2010 |
| Deputy Minister of Mines and Mining Development | Hon. Gift Chimanikire | 23 June 2010 – 22 August 2013 |

Public Service
| Minister of Public Service | Hon. **Eliphas Mukonoweshuro** | 11 February 2009 – 22 August 2013 |
| Deputy Minister of Public Service | Hon. Andrew Langa | 20 February 2009 – 22 August 2013 |

Public Works
| Minister of Public Works | Hon. **Theresa Makone** | 11 February 2009 – 23 June 2010 |
| Minister of Public Works | Hon. **Joel Gabuza Gabbuza** | 23 June 2010 – 22 August 2013 |
| Deputy Minister of Public Works | Hon. Aguy Georgias | 20 February 2009 – 22 August 2013 |

Regional Integration and International Co-operation
| Minister of Regional Integration and International Co-operation | Hon. **Priscilla Misihairabwi-Mushonga** | 11 February 2009 – 22 August 2013 |
| Deputy Minister of Regional Integration and International Co-operation | Hon. Reuben Marumahoko | 20 February 2009 – 22 August 2013 |

Science and Technology
| Minister of Science and Technology | Hon. **Heneri Dzinotyiweyi** | 11 February 2009 – 22 August 2013 |

Small and Medium Enterprises and Co-operative Development
| Minister of Small and Medium Enterprises and Co-operative Development | Hon. **Sithembiso Nyoni** | 11 February 2009 – 21 November 2017 |

State Enterprises and Parastatals
| Minister of State Enterprises and Parastatals | Hon. **Joel Gabuza Gabbuza** | 11 February 2009 – 23 June 2010 |
| Minister of State Enterprises and Parastatals | Hon. **Gorden Moyo** | 23 June 2010 – 22 August 2013 |
| Deputy Minister of State Enterprises and Parastatals | Hon. Walter Kufakunesu Chidhakwa | 20 February 2009 – 22 August 2013 |

Tourism and Hospitality Industry
| Minister of Tourism and Hospitality Industry | Hon. **Walter Mzembi** | 11 February 2009 – 9 October 2017 |

Transport and Infrastructural Development
| Minister of Transport and Infrastructural Development | Hon. **Nicholas Goche** | 11 February 2009 – 22 August 2013 |
| Deputy Minister of Transport and Infrastructural Development | Hon. Tichaona Mudzingwa | 20 February 2009 – 22 August 2013 |

Water Resources and Development
| Minister of Water Resources and Development | Hon. **Samuel Sipepa Nkomo** | 11 February 2009 – 22 August 2013 |

Women's Affairs, Gender and Community Development
| Minister of Women's Affairs, Gender and Community Development | Hon. **Olivia Muchena** | 11 February 2009 – 22 August 2013 |
| Deputy Minister of Women's Affairs, Gender and Community Development | Hon. Evelyn Pfugamai Masaiti | 20 February 2009 – 23 June 2010 |
| Deputy Minister of Women's Affairs, Gender and Community Development | Hon. Jessie Fungai Majome | 23 June 2010 – 22 August 2013 |

Youth Development, Indigenisation and Empowerment
| Minister of Youth Development, Indigenisation and Empowerment | Hon. **Saviour Kasukuwere** | 11 February 2009 – 22 August 2013 |
| Deputy Minister of Youth Development, Indigenisation and Empowerment | Hon. Thamsanqa Mahlangu | 20 February 2009 – 23 June 2010 |
| Deputy Minister of Youth Development, Indigenisation and Empowerment | Hon. Tongai Matutu | 23 June 2010 – 22 August 2013 |

=== Provincial Governors ===
Provincial Governors
| Bulawayo | Hon. **Cain Mathema** | 10 February 2004 – 28 June 2013 |
| Harare | Hon. **David Ishemunyoro Karimanzira** | 15 April 2005 – 24 March 2011† |
| Manicaland | Hon. **Christopher Mushohwe** | 25 August 2008 – 28 June 2013 |
| Mashonaland Central | Hon. **Martin Dinha** | 25 August 2008 – 28 June 2013 |
| Mashonaland East | Hon. **Aeneas Chigwedere** | 25 August 2008 – 28 June 2013 |
| Mashonaland West | Hon. **Faber Chidarikire** | 24 August 2008 – 28 June 2013 |
| Masvingo | Hon. **Titus Maluleke** | 25 August 2008 – 28 June 2013 |
| Matabeleland North | Hon. **Thokozile Mathuthu** | 15 April 2005 – 28 June 2013 |
| Matabeleland South | Hon. **Angeline Masuku** | 1 December 2003 – 28 June 2013 |
| Midlands | Hon. **Jaison Machaya** | 25 August 2008 – 28 June 2013 |
