= Second Shadow Cabinet of Morgan Tsvangirai =

Morgan Tsvangirai, leader of the Movement for Democratic Change - Tsvangirai, announced his party's shadow cabinet on 18 September 2013. It is the first time since 2009 that MDC-T formed a cabinet in opposition, as it had been part of a government of national unity with the ZANU-PF from that time until the end of the coalition in 2013.

== List ==
- Morgan Tsvangirai - Leader of the Opposition
- Gordon Moyo - International Relations and Cooperation
- Thamsanqa Mahlangu - Tourism, Environment and Natural Resources
- Tendai Biti - Finance and Economic Development
- Gift Chimanikire - Defence
- Ruth Labode - Health and Child Welfare
- Concilia Chinanzvavana - Basic Education
- Dr Peter Matarutse - Higher Education Science and Technology
- Sesel Zvidzai - Local Government
- Elias Mudzuri - Transport
- Nelson Chamisa - Communications
- Abednico Bhebhe - Mines and Minerals Development
- Sen. Morgan Komichi - Energy and Power Development
- Sipepa Nkomo - Agriculture, Land and Water Development
- Jessie Majome - Justice Legal and Parliamentary Affairs
- Sen. Lilian Timveos - Home Affairs
- Tapiwa Mashakada - Industry and Commerce Hon
- Paurina Mpariwa - Labour, Employment and Social Security
- Lucia Matibenga - Women's Affairs, Gender and Community Development
- Solomon Madzore - Youth, Sport, Arts & Culture
- Joel Gabuza - Public Works and National Housing

=== Planning Commission ===
In addition, Tsvangirai formed a five-member "planning commission" of non-parliamentary party advisors:

- Jameson Timba
- Theresa Makone
- Douglas Mwonzora
- Tongai Matutu
- Elton Mangoma
