= Thokozani Khupe =

Zimbabwean politician and trade unionist

The Honourable Thokozani Khupe Senator
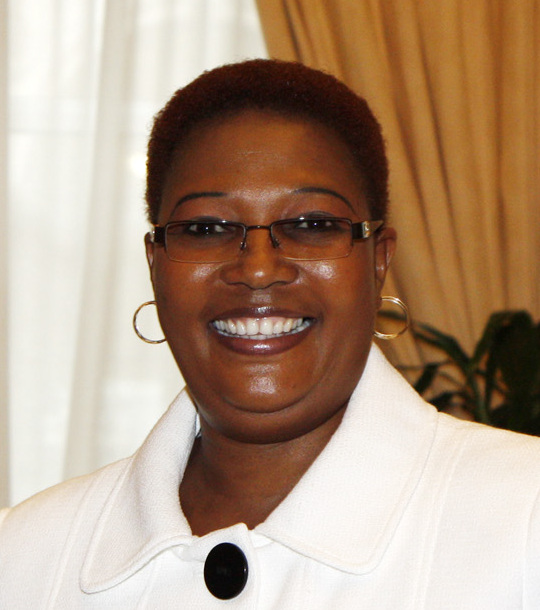

President of the Movement for Democratic Change – Tsvangirai
- In office 15 February 2018 – December 2020; Disputed with Nelson Chamisa
- Preceded by: Morgan Tsvangirai
- Succeeded by: Douglas Mwonzora

Vice-President of the Movement for Democratic Change
- In office November 2005 – 15 February 2018
- President: Morgan Tsvangirai
- Preceded by: Position established

Deputy Prime Minister of Zimbabwe
- In office 11 February 2009 – 22 August 2013 Serving with Arthur Mutambara
- President: Robert Gabriel Mugabe
- Prime Minister: Morgan Tsvangirai
- Preceded by: Position established
- Succeeded by: Position abolished

Member of Parliament for Makokoba
- In office March 2000 – 2018
- Preceded by: Sithembiso Nyoni
- Majority: 8,450 (50.8%)

Secretary for Transport of the Movement for Democratic Change
- In office 2000–2005
- President: Morgan Tsvangirai
- Preceded by: Position established
- Succeeded by: Paurina Mpariwa

Personal details
- Born: 18 November 1963 (age 62) Makokoba, Southern Rhodesia
- Party: Movement for Democratic Change – Tsvangirai (until 2022); Citizens Coalition for Change (since 2022)
- Profession: Trade unionist

Thokozani Khupe (born 18 November 1963) is a Zimbabwean politician, trade unionist and CCC party member. She was Deputy Prime Minister 2009–13.

Following the death of party founder Morgan Tsvangirai in early 2018 Khupe opposed the ascent of Nelson Chamisa as leader of the MDC-T on the grounds that she was the only one of its three Vice Presidents elected by congress, whereas Chamisa and the third vice president Elias Mudzuri had been appointed by Tsvangirai. Khupe was supported by much of the party organization in this, but lost the power struggle to Chamisa; Khupe and her supporters consider their faction the legitimate MDC-T and have continued to use the MDC-T name. They are involved in a court battle with the Chamisa faction over the party name, symbols, logo and trademark; the matter had not been resolved prior to the 2018 general elections and the Khupe faction ran in the elections as the MDC-T while the much bigger Chamisa faction ran as part of the MDC Alliance.

On 22 April 2018, she was elected unopposed as the president of her MDC-T faction at an extraordinary congress in Bulawayo.

In 2020 she was removed from the position of party president by Douglas Mwonzora amid strong claims of violence and cheating from her supporters.

== Education ==
Born in Bulawayo, Khupe graduated in 1999 from the Turin Centre in Turin, Italy, with a certificate in Information Technology. She also holds a Bachelor of Arts in Media Studies from the Zimbabwe Open University, Master of Business Administration, MBA from the National University of Science and Technology, and a PhD in Social Studies from the University of Zimbabwe.

== Trade union politics ==
She served as an official of the Zimbabwe Amalgamated Railway Union (ZARU) in 1987. In 1991 she was elected secretary of the ZCTU Women's Advisory Council and also became a member of the General Council of the ZCTU. In 1999 she participated in the formation of the Movement for Democratic Change party, in which she was elected as a National Executive member responsible for Transport, Logistics and Welfare.

== Political career ==
In June 2000, Khupe was elected as the Member of Parliament for Makokoba Constituency in Bulawayo.

She was a member of the Budget, Finance and Economic Development Committee; and on Youth Development, Gender and Employment Creation Committee and was elected vice chairperson of the Women's Parliamentary Caucus and became Parliamentary Deputy Chief Whip of the MDC. She retained the constituency in the March 2005 parliamentary election. She is in the Parliamentary Portfolio Committee of Defense, Home Affairs and National Security and that of Budget, Finance and Economic Development.

In the March 2008 parliamentary election, Khupe ran for re-election in Makokoba constituency as the candidate of the MDC-Tsvangirai faction, defeating Welshman Ncube, the Secretary-General of the MDC-Mutambara faction. She received 4,123 votes against 2,475 votes for Ncube.

She was for several years an active member of the African Parliamentary Network against Corruption.

Khupe was Deputy Prime Minister of Zimbabwe from 11 February 2009 to August 2013 in the government of national unity between the MDC-T and ZANU-PF. She was a Member of Parliament for Makokoba constituency before being recalled by her party in 2018 on the grounds that she no longer represented the party's interests.

In 2005 she was elected vice-president of the Movement for Democratic Change (MDC) taking over from veteran trade unionist Gibson Sibanda.

One of her close allies in the Senate of Zimbabwe was Mildred Reason Dube.

In March 2022, Khuphe urged Zimbabweans to vote for Chamisa's Citizens Coalition for Change in that month's by-election.

== Electoral history ==
General Election 2008: Makokoba
Party	Candidate	Votes	%	±%
MDC–T	Thokozani Khupe	4,123	50.8	−25.0
MDC-M	Welshman Ncube	2,475	37.7	+37.7
ZANU–PF	Tshinga Judge Dube	2,002	12.5	−11.1
Majority		1,648	10.2	−26.2
Turnout		16,100		
MDC–T hold		Swing		

General Election 2005: Makokoba
Party	Candidate	Votes	%	±%
MDC	Thokozani Khupe	12,120	75.8	−8.9
ZANU–PF	Sihle Thebe	3,777	23.6	+10.6
Independent	Charles Mpofu	84	0.5	N/A
Majority		8,343	52.2	−19.5
Turnout		15,981	36.4	+0.6
MDC hold		Swing		

General Election 2000: Makokoba
Party	Candidate	Votes	%	±%
MDC	Thokozani Khupe	20,781	84.7	N/A
ZANU–PF	Sithembiso Nyoni	3,193	13.0	−51.6
Independent	Others	552	2.2	N/A
Majority		17,588	71.7	
Turnout		24,526	35.8	
MDC gain from ZANU–PF		Swing		
