= Mount Darwin West =

- Constituency for the National Assembly of Zimbabwe
- Province: Mashonaland Central
- Region: Mount Darwin District

Current constituency
- Number of members: 1
- Party: ZANU–PF
- Member(s): Witness Jonga

Mount Darwin West is a constituency represented in the National Assembly of the Parliament of Zimbabwe. Its current MP since the 2023 general election is Witness Jonga of ZANU–PF.

== Members ==
Election	Name	Party
2008	Joice Mujuru	ZANU–PF
2013	Joice Mujuru	ZANU–PF
2015 by-election	Bannwell Seremwe	ZANU–PF
2018	Bannwell Seremwe	ZANU–PF
2023	Witness Jonga	ZANU–PF

== Election results ==
In the 2008 parliamentary election, Vice-President Joyce Mujuru was the ZANU–PF candidate. She faced two Movement for Democratic Change (MDC) candidates, Madzudzo Gora from the MDC–T, the formation supporting Morgan Tsvangirai, and Joseph Shanya from the MDC–M, the faction supporting Arthur Mutambara.

Both official results released by the Zimbabwe Electoral Commission and those announced by independent/opposition groups indicated that Mujuru won with a large majority.

The following results are the official results.

General Election 2008: Mount Darwin West
Party	Candidate	Votes	%	±%
ZANU–PF	Joyce Mujuru	13270	83.20	
Movement for Democratic Change – Tsvangirai	Gora Madzudzo	1792	11.24	
MDC (Mutambara)	Shanya Joseph	887	5.56	
Majority		11478	71.96	
Turnout		15949		

Bannwell Seremwe of ZANU–PF was elected MP for the constituency in a 2015 by-election, and was reelected in the 2018 general election.

== See also ==
- List of Zimbabwean parliamentary constituencies
