= Deputy Prime Minister of Zimbabwe =

Former deputy head of government in Zimbabwe

The Deputy Prime Minister is a former political position in Zimbabwe which has existed twice in the history of Zimbabwe.

The position was established last time because of the deal arising out of political negotiations in 2008. Per that deal, there are two designated deputy prime ministers as of 2008: Arthur Mutambara of a faction of the MDC and Thokozani Khuphe, who is a member of the prime minister Morgan Tsvangirai's faction of the MDC.

== Deputy Prime Ministers ==
Image	Name	Prime Minister	Took office	Left office	Notes
	Simon Muzenda	Robert Mugabe	18 April 1980	22 December 1987	
	Arthur Mutambara	Morgan Tsvangirai	11 February 2009	22 August 2013	
	Thokozani Khuphe	Morgan Tsvangirai	11 February 2009	22 August 2013	

== See also ==
- Prime Minister of Zimbabwe
- Prime Minister of Zimbabwe Rhodesia
- Deputy Prime Minister of Rhodesia
