= Olivia Muchena =

Zimbabwean politician

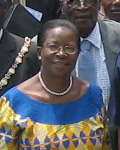
- Muchena, June 2006

Ministry of Higher and Tertiary Education
- In office 10 September 2013 – 9 December 2014
- President: Robert Mugabe
- Deputy: Godfrey Gandawa
- Preceded by: Stan Mudenge
- Succeeded by: Oppah Muchinguri

Minister of Women Affairs, Gender and Community Development
- In office 13 February 2009 – 10 September 2013
- Prime Minister: Morgan Tsvangirai
- Deputy: Evelyn Masaiti
- Preceded by: Sithembiso Nyoni (Acting)

Minister of Science and Technology Development of Zimbabwe
- In office Unknown – 13 February 2009
- President: Robert Mugabe
- Succeeded by: Henry Dzinotyiweyi

Personal details
- Born: 18 August 1946 (age 80) Mutoko, Southern Rhodesia
- Party: Zimbabwe African National Union-Patriotic Front
- Education: Iowa State University

Olivia Nyembezi Muchena (born 18 August 1946) is a Zimbabwean politician and the former Minister of Higher Education in the Cabinet of Zimbabwe. She has also served as the Minister of Science and Technology Development and as the Minister of Women's Affairs.

== Early life and education ==
Muchena studied at Iowa State University and graduated with a PhD in agriculture and minors in social change and technology. During the late 1970s she was a faculty member at the University of Rhodesia. When Muchena started her career at the University of Zimbabwe in 1983, she held the positions of Deputy Dean and Senior Lecturer. When her position as Deputy Dean ended in 1985, she remained as a lecturer until 1995.

== Politics ==
Muchena had served in various positions in the Zimbabwe government including in the Office of the Vice President and the Ministry of Agriculture. During her position in the Ministry of Agriculture, she was involved in Zimbabwe's land reform process. When the ZANU-PF–MDC national unity government was sworn in on February 13, 2009, Muchena became Minister of Women's Affairs.

In June 2015, Muchena lost her seat in the Senate of Zimbabwe after the ZANU-PF ousted her out for supporting Joice Mujuru, who was formerly the Vice-President of Zimbabwe.

She was placed on the United States sanctions list in 2003.

== Literature ==
She contributed the piece "It can only be handled by women" to the 1984 anthology Sisterhood Is Global: The International Women's Movement Anthology, edited by Robin Morgan.

== Achievements ==
Muchena has received multiple awards including a scholarship from the Africa-America Institute and a fellowship from Kellogg International.
