= Ministry of State Enterprise and Parastatals (Zimbabwe) =

Former government ministry of Zimbabwe

The Ministry of State Enterprise and Parastatals is a government ministry which existed during the Government of National Unity (2009 - 2013) and was responsible for the supervision of parastatals in Zimbabwe.

The incumbent minister was Samuel Sipepa Nkomo and the deputy minister was Walter Chidakwa.
