= Gibson Sibanda =

Zimbabwean politician and trade unionist

Gibson Jama Sibanda (1944 – 24 August 2010) was a Zimbabwean politician and trade unionist. He was a founding member of the Movement for Democratic Change and at the time of his death was the Vice-President of the faction of the Movement for Democratic Change led by Arthur Mutambara. A former president of the Zimbabwe Congress of Trade Unions, he was first elected to the House of Assembly in the 2000 parliamentary election. He was a member of the Senate and a Minister of State in the Office of Deputy Prime Minister Arthur Mutambara at the time of his death in 2010.

== Early life ==
Sibanda was born in Filabusi, Matabeleland South, in 1944. He went to school at Thekwane High School near Bulawayo in Matabeleland. He was classmates with Paul Tangi Mhova Mkondo and he was taught by Canaan Banana and Edson Zvobgo.

He played football for Rio Tinto FC.

He then worked on the Rhodesia railways (National Railways of Zimbabwe after 1980) and was a trade unionist before going into politics as Welfare Secretary of ZAPU (being jailed by the Rhodesian government from 1976 to 1979).

After independence in 1980 he continued his work as a train driver at the NRZ. During his time at the NRZ he was active in the trade union and became the ZCTU president. At the same time he was promoted to Running Shed Foreman at the NRZ by the time he won the 2000 parliamentary elections as an MP for Nkulumane constituency.

In 1984 Sibanda was elected President of five amalgamated railway trades unions. He studied and obtained a Diploma in Industrial Labour Relations, and was the first Vice-President of the Zimbabwe Congress of Trade Unions in 1988 before serving as President from 1989. He was a leading member of the initiative for the ZCTU to establish a political party in 2000, being unanimously elected as Vice-President at the inaugural congress.

== MDC activity ==
Sibanda was elected to the House of Assembly from Nkulumane in the 2000 election, defeating ZANU-PF candidate Dumiso Dabengwa.

In 2005, Sibanda was the leader of a faction within the MDC which advocated that the party should participate in elections to the Senate of Zimbabwe, which it had opposed. When the MDC National Council voted to support participation, MDC leader Morgan Tsvangirai suspended Sibanda and his supporters, such as Welshman Ncube, pending a Congress in February 2006. They accused Tsvangirai of being dictatorial and said that they had actually suspended him.

The MDC split in October 2005, a result of escalating internal tensions which saw Tsvangirai differ sharply with some of his senior colleagues on various policy issues, including election participation.

Sibanda was elected to the Senate in the March 2008 parliamentary election. He stood as a candidate for the post of President of the Senate on 25 August 2008, and he was backed by both MDC factions, but was defeated by ZANU-PF candidate Edna Madzongwe, receiving 28 votes against 58 votes for Madzongwe.

== Death ==
Sibanda died in 2010 after a battle with cancer and was the first member of the opposition to be declared a national hero by both MDC parties, but their plea for Gibson Sibanda to be buried at the Heroes' Acre was denied by President Robert Mugabe.
