= Heneri Dzinotyiweyi =

Zimbabwean mathematician and politician

The Right Honourable Heneri Dzinotyiweyi MP

Minister of Science and Technology Development of Zimbabwe
- Incumbent
- Assumed office 13 February 2009
- Prime Minister: Morgan Tsvangirai
- Preceded by: Olivia Muchena

Personal details
- Party: Movement for Democratic Change-Tsvangirai
- Education: University of Zimbabwe; University of Aberdeen

Heneri Amos Murima Dzinotyiweyi is a Zimbabwean mathematician and politician. A former University of Zimbabwe Dean of Science, he is the Movement for Democratic Change-Tsvangirai member of parliament for Budiriro in Harare.

On 10 February 2009, Morgan Tsvangirai designated Dzinotyiweyi for the position of Minister of Science and Technology Development as part of the Zimbabwe Government of National Unity of 2009.
