= Mildred Reason Dube =

Zimbabwean politician (died 2022)

Member of the Senate of Zimbabwe for Bulawayo
- In office 30 July 2018 – 27 June 2022

Personal details
- Died: 27 June 2022
- Party: MDC–T–Khuphe (since 2022); MDC–T (until 2022)

Mildred Reason Dube (died 27 June 2022) was a Zimbabwean politician who served in the Senate of Zimbabwe from 2018 until her death in 2022, representing Bulawayo. First elected in the 2018 Zimbabwean general election, Dube was a close ally of Thokozani Khupe.

In 2020, Dube, who was a member of the Movement for Democratic Change – Tsvangirai party, was threatened with expulsion from the party by party-leader Nixon Nyikadzino; however, she was protected by Khupe, who was the party's acting president. Dube later became the leader of the MDC–T's parliamentary caucus. However, in January 2022, Dube, Khupe, and two other allies of Khupe were expelled from the party, following Khupe's decision to split from the MDC–T and create a new party.

In 2021, Dube supported a bill proposed by the Zimbabwe African National Union – Patriotic Front, the ruling party of Zimbabwe, which would amend the Constitution of Zimbabwe to remove the direct election of the vice-president, extend the tenure of judges, and guarantee quotas for women in parliament and local government. The prior two provisions were seen as a move intended to concentrate power in the presidency. In addition to Dube, ten other MDC–T senators supported the amendment.

Dube died on 27 June 2022.
