= Jameson Timba =

Zimbabwe politician

Jameson Zvidzai Timba is a Zimbabwean politician.

== Early life and education ==
From 2004 to 2008, he was the chairman of the board of trustees of Arundel School and, from 2005, he was the chairman of the Association of Trust Schools, a grouping of all private schools in Zimbabwe. During this period, he successfully defended the right of independent schools to exist and operate without state interference by mounting ten lawsuits against the Minister of Education without a single loss. He holds a Bachelor of Science in political science and a Master of Business Administration (MBA) from the University of Zimbabwe.

== Political career ==
Timba served as a Minister of State in the office of the Prime Minister of Zimbabwe (2010 to 2013) and the Deputy Minister of Media, Information and Publicity (2009-2010). He was the Member of House of Assembly for Mount Pleasant (MDC-T) (2008 to 2013). He was the Chief Political Advisor to Prime Minister Morgan Tsvangirai and assisted in discharging the constitutional mandate of overseeing the formulation of policy by cabinet and supervised its implementation by the entirety of government. Prior to this, he had successfully pushed for the operationalization of an independent Media Commission and the opening up of the print media environment, which was dominated by the state, leading to the registration of two independent daily newspapers to complement independent weekly newspapers.

On January 31, 2024, he was elected Party Leader of the Citizens Coalition for Change following the resignation of founding leader Nelson Chamisa. On 23 November 2024, Timba, was convicted along with 34 others on charges of unlawful assembly after being arrested at Timba's house in Harare in June. He was sentenced to a suspended two-year prison term on 27 November, a decision that drew widespread condemnation. His arrest was part of a broader crackdown on dissent in which over 160 opposition activists were detained ahead of Zimbabwe’s hosting of the Southern African Development Community (SADC) Summit of Heads of State and Government in August 2024.

In October 2024, while still in detention, he was elected in absentia to the Board of the Progressive Alliance to represent Africa.
