= Samuel Sipepa Nkomo =

Zimbabwean politician

The Right Honourable Samuel Sipepa Nkomo

Minister of State Enterprise and Parastatals of Zimbabwe
- Incumbent
- Assumed office 13 February 2009
- Prime Minister: Morgan Tsvangirai

Personal details
- Born: 1946 or 1947 (age 78–79)
- Party: Movement for Democratic Change-Tsvangirai
- Spouse(s): Magqwetha (m. 1974; div. 2009) Roselyn Xaba (nee Moyo)

Samuel Sipepa Nkomo (born 1946 or 1947) is a former Zimbabwe Minister of Water Resources Development and Management. He was nominated for appointment to the Senate of Zimbabwe as a non-constituency senator.

Sipepa Nkomo had an extensive political career spanning 58 years. He was actively involved in various political movements and parties, including the Movement for Democratic Change (MDC) and later the National People's Party (NPP).

He spent 14 years in prison during his political career and was actively involved in the struggle for Zimbabwe's independence (New Zimbabwe).

Nkomo retired from politics in 2018, expressing his desire to focus on writing his personal memoirs and documenting his experiences, especially his time in prison.

== Matabeleland Zambezi Water Project ==
He is also the Water Resources Minister. During his tenure as the Minister of Water Resources, he was involved in the controversial Matabeleland Zambezi Water Project. Allegations were made that he stalled the project by refusing to cooperate with the Matabeleland Zambezi Water Trust (MZWT), which aimed to develop water resources for the Matabeleland region.

Nkomo justified his stance by arguing that the project should remain a government responsibility rather than a privatized venture. He believed that handling the project as a national initiative would ensure its successful completion, similar to other government-funded water projects.
