= Minister of State in the Prime Minister's Office (Zimbabwe) =

The Minister of State in the Prime Minister's Office was a non-cabinet ministerial position in the government of Zimbabwe. The incumbent was Gordon Moyo. The duties of the position were never publicly defined, although Prime Minister Morgan Tsvangirai indicated it included responsibility for student affairs.
