= Prime Minister of Zimbabwe =

Head of government

Prime Minister of the Republic of Zimbabwe
- Nduna Yaikulu ya Zimbabwe (Chichewa)
- Coat of arms of Zimbabwe
- Residence: Zimbabwe House, Harare
- Appointer: President of Zimbabwe
- Formation: 18 April 1980; 11 February 2009
- First holder: Robert Mugabe
- Final holder: Morgan Tsvangirai
- Abolished: 31 December 1987; 22 August 2013

The prime minister of Zimbabwe was a political office in the government of Zimbabwe that existed on two occasions. The first person to hold the position was Robert Mugabe from 1980 to 1987 following independence from the United Kingdom. He took office when Southern Rhodesia became the Republic of Zimbabwe on 18 April 1980. This position was abolished when the constitution was amended in 1987 and Mugabe became president of Zimbabwe, replacing Canaan Banana as the head of state while also remaining the head of government. The office of prime minister was restored in 2009 and held by Morgan Tsvangirai until the position was again abolished by the 2013 Constitution of Zimbabwe.

== History of the office ==
=== Original office ===
Zimbabwe's prime ministerial office owes its origins to the country's predecessor states. The position began with George Mitchell who became prime minister of Southern Rhodesia in 1933. All subsequent predecessor-states continued with the post until Abel Muzorewa who became prime minister of Zimbabwe Rhodesia in 1979 under the Internal Settlement. The Lancaster House Agreement brought an independence constitution which made provision for a parliamentary system, with a president as head of state and a prime minister as head of government. The presidency was mostly ceremonial; real power was vested with the prime minister.

The 1980 election resulted in a ZANU–PF victory with Robert Mugabe becoming prime minister and Canaan Banana president. Mugabe and Banana were returned to office in the 1985 election.

However, in 1987 the government revised the constitution and made the presidency an executive post. The prime minister's post was abolished, and its functions were effectively merged with those of the president. Mugabe ascended to the presidency.

=== Restored office ===
The restoration of the office of prime minister in 2009 was a result of a power-sharing agreement made in September 2008 between Mugabe's ZANU–PF and rival candidate Morgan Tsvangirai's MDC–T after the 2008 presidential election and later run-off. Mugabe remained president while Tsvangirai was sworn into the office of prime minister on 11 February 2009. Executive authority was shared between the president, the prime minister and the cabinet, with ZANU–PF and the MDC–T sharing portfolio ministries. It was the prime minister's role to chair the council of ministers and act as the deputy chairperson of Cabinet and also oversee the formulation of government policies by the Cabinet. In addition, the prime minister was a member of the National Security Council, chaired by the president and sat alongside the heads of the armed forces, intelligence, prison services and police. According to section 20.1.8 of the 1980 Constitution of Zimbabwe (No. 19) Amendment, the prime minister, vice-presidents and deputy prime ministers became ex officio members of the House of Assembly without needing to represent parliamentary constituencies, and the party of a constituency-based MP who concurrently served in any of the above offices held the right to nominate non-constituency members to such offices. The post of prime minister did not hold the full executive powers it held during the 1980s and the president remained head of the cabinet. In 2012 Tsvangirai claimed that the power-sharing agreement was not being honoured and that he was not being consulted by the president over some appointments. The government held a referendum in March 2013 to approve a new constitution. As a result, the post of prime minister was abolished from 22 August 2013. Tsvangirai and Mugabe both contested the general election in July 2013 for the single post of president. Mugabe was elected.

== List of officeholders ==
No.	Portrait	Prime Minister	Took office	Left office	Time in office	Party	Election	President(s)
1	Robert Mugabe	Robert Mugabe (1924–2019)	18 April 1980	31 December 1987	7 years, 257 days	ZANU	1980; 1985	Canaan Banana
Post abolished (31 December 1987 – 11 February 2009)
2	Morgan Tsvangirai	Morgan Tsvangirai (1952–2018)	11 February 2009	22 August 2013	4 years, 192 days	MDC–T	2008 (Note: Appointed to the post of prime minister following the 2008–2009 political negotiations.)	Robert Mugabe
Post abolished (22 August 2013 – present)

== Rank by time in office ==
Rank	President	Time in office
1	Robert Mugabe	7 years, 257 days
2	Morgan Tsvangirai	4 years, 192 days

== See also ==
- President of Zimbabwe
- Deputy Prime Minister of Zimbabwe
- Prime Minister of Rhodesia
- Prime Minister of Zimbabwe Rhodesia
