= Minister of State in the Deputy Prime Minister's Office (Zimbabwe) =

The Minister of State in the Deputy Prime Minister's Office was a non-cabinet ministerial position in the government of Zimbabwe. There were two incumbents: Gibson Sibanda and Sekai Holland. The duties of the position were never publicly defined.
