= Buhera West =

- Constituency for the National Assembly of Zimbabwe
- Region: Buhera District, Manicaland

Current constituency
- Party: ZANU–PF
- Member: Tafadzwa Mugwadi

Buhera West is a constituency represented in the National Assembly of the Parliament of Zimbabwe, located in Manicaland Province. Its current MP since the 2023 general election is Tafadzwa Mugwadi of ZANU–PF.

== Electoral history ==
In the 2008 general election, Eric Matinenga of the Movement for Democratic Change – Tsvangirai was elected MP for the constituency, defeating Tapiwa Zengeya of ZANU–PF and independent candidate Stanlake Muzhingi.

In 2018 election, Soul Dzuma of ZANU–PF was elected MP.

== See also ==
- List of Zimbabwean parliamentary constituencies
