= Joice Mujuru =

Zimbabwean politician (born 1955)

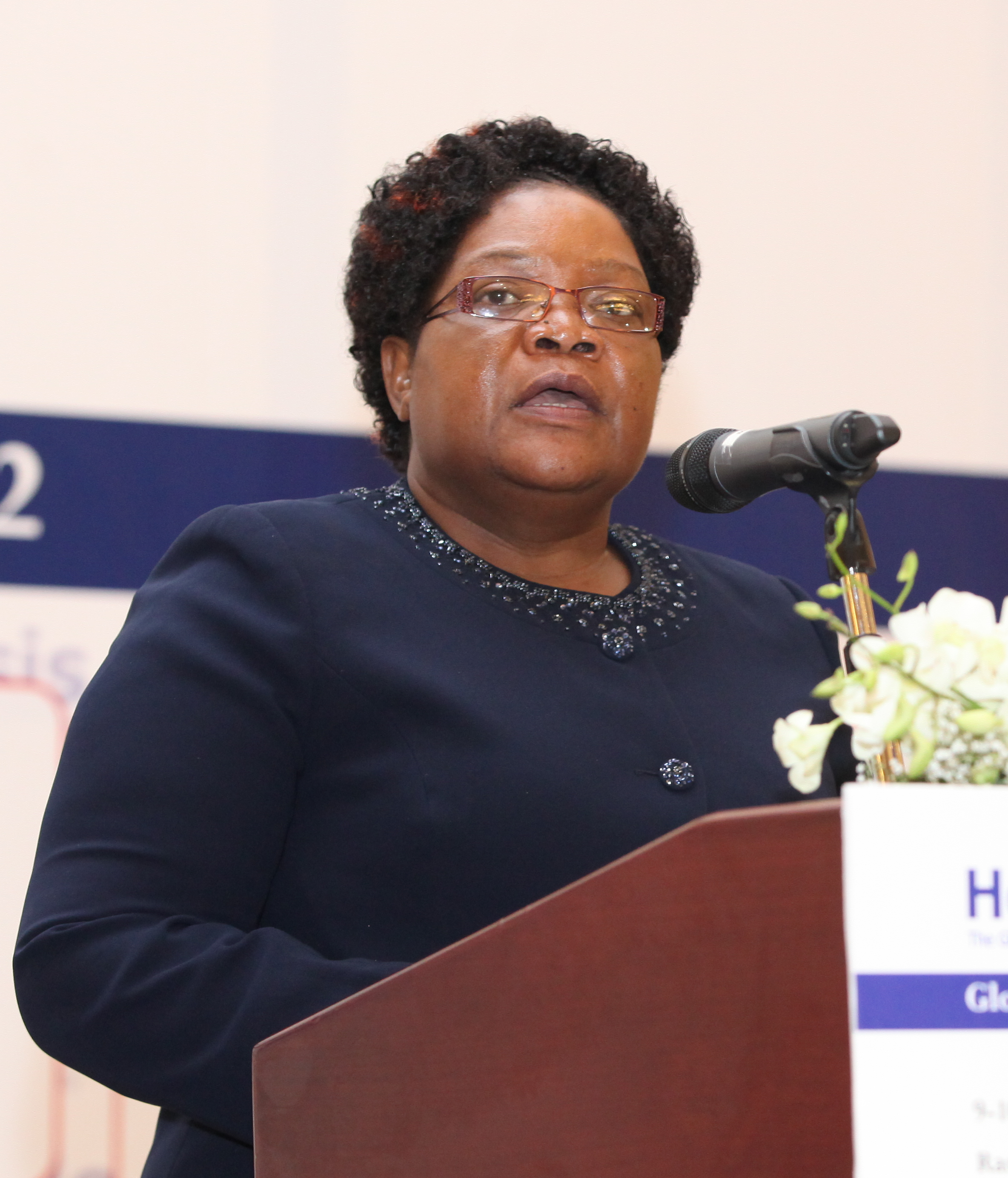
- Mujuru in 2012

First Vice-President of Zimbabwe
- In office 6 December 2004 – 8 December 2014
- President: Robert Mugabe
- Preceded by: Simon Muzenda
- Succeeded by: Emmerson Mnangagwa

President of the National People's Party
- Incumbent
- Assumed office 2017
- Preceded by: Party established

Vice-President and Second Secretary of ZANU-PF
- In office 6 December 2004 – 8 December 2014 Serving with Joseph Msika (1999-2009); John Nkomo (2009-2013); Phelekezela Mphoko (2014-2017)
- President: Robert Mugabe
- Preceded by: Simon Muzenda
- Succeeded by: Emmerson Mnangagwa

Secretary of the ZANU–PF Women's League
- In office 1981–1988
- Preceded by: Sally Mugabe
- Succeeded by: Tsungirirai Hungwe

Personal details
- Born: Runaida Mugari; 15 April 1955 (age 71) Mount Darwin, Southern Rhodesia (now Zimbabwe)
- Party: National People's Party (since 2017); Zimbabwe People First (2016–17); ZANU–PF (until 2015)
- Spouse: Solomon Mujuru (m. 1977; died 2011)
- Children: 4
- Education: Women's University in Africa
- Nickname: Teurai Ropa

Military service
- Allegiance: Zimbabwe African National Liberation Army
- Years of service: 1972–1979
- Rank: Commissar
- Commands: Second-in-Command of Zhunta Camp
- Battles/wars: Rhodesian Bush War

Joice Runaida Mujuru (née Mugari; born 15 April 1955), also known by her nom-de-guerre Teurai Ropa Nhongo, is a Zimbabwean revolutionary and politician who served as Vice-president of Zimbabwe from 2004 to 2014. Previously, she had served as a government minister and as vice-president of ZANU–PF. She was married to Solomon Mujuru until his death in 2011 and was long considered a potential successor to President Robert Mugabe, but in 2014 she was denounced for allegedly plotting against Mugabe. As a result of the accusations against her, Mujuru lost both her post as vice-president and her position in the party leadership. She was expelled from the party a few months later, after which she formed the new Zimbabwe People First party.

== Early life ==
Runaida Mugari was born in Zimbabwe's Northeastern district of Mount Darwin, a Shona from the Korekore language group. She attended a Salvation Army mission school, Howard High in Chiweshe in Mashonaland Central Province.

At eighteen years old, Mujuru was the only woman who trained in Lusaka. After completing two years of secondary education, she decided to join the Rhodesian Bush War. She is said to have downed a helicopter with a machine gun on 17 February 1974 after refusing to flee. The helicopter downing incident has been vehemently denied by War Veterans chairman, Christopher Mutsvangwa after her expulsion from the party; other ballistic experts have also questioned the possibility of shooting down a helicopter with such a light weapon as narrated on her story. By 1975, she was the political instructor of two successful military bases. At 21, Mujuru was camp commander at the Chimoio military and refugee camp in Mozambique.

She took the nom-de-guerre Teurai Ropa Nhongo (Shona for "spill blood"), and then rose to become one of the first women commanders in Mugabe's ZANLA forces. In 1977, she married Solomon Mujuru, known then by his nom-de-guerre Rex Nhongo, deputy commander-in-chief of ZANLA. That same year, she became the youngest member of the ZANU Central Committee, a member of the National Executive. Her political activity made her a target for the Rhodesian Security Forces, which tried to capture her but were unsuccessful. As part of Operation Dingo, the ZANLA camp in Chimoio was attacked by Rhodesian soldiers on November 23, 1977. Mujuru managed to elude capture by hiding in a well-used communal pit latrine. In 1978, when her camp came under attack, Muruju—nine months pregnant at the time—was still an active combatant. She gave birth only days later.

Upon return from the war, little was known of the origins of her name and her real name. Her mother, in an interview for The Sunday Mail newspaper at her rural Mount Darwin home, spoke exclusively to journalist and media anthropologist Robert Mukondiwa, to whom she revealed that Joice was a name she had also adopted during her time away at the war. Her actual name, he was told, was Runaida, which had been her late paternal aunt's name.

The Mujurus now live on a 3,500-acre (14 km^{2}) requisitioned farm, Alamein Farm, 45 miles (72 km) south of Harare, which has been found by the Supreme Court in Zimbabwe to have been illegally seized from the farm owner.

== Political career ==
At independence in 1980, Mujuru became the youngest cabinet minister in the cabinet, taking the portfolio of sports, youth and recreation. She fitted secondary school in between her busy schedule after she was appointed minister.

As Minister of Telecommunications, she tried to stop Strive Masiyiwa from establishing his independent cellphone network Econet. Masiyiwa had been given an ultimatum by the cabinet to sell his imported equipment to his rivals. On 24 March 1997, Mujuru decided to issue Zimbabwe's second cellular telephone licence to the previously unknown Zairois consortium Telecel, cutting out Masiyiwa. The Zairois consortium included her husband Solomon and President Robert Mugabe's nephew Leo. After many legal fights, Masiyiwa won his licence in December 1997.

=== Vice-president ===
The ZANU-PF Women's League resolved at its annual conference held in September 2004 to put forward a female candidate for the party's vice-presidency, a position left vacant following the death of Simon Muzenda.

Mugabe bowed to pressure from a ZANU-PF faction led by Mujuru's husband, General Solomon Mujuru, to give a woman the second vice-presidency post—effectively sidelining Speaker of Parliament Emmerson Mnangagwa, widely seen as his favoured heir. This ZANU-PF reshuffle was dubbed "the night of the long knives" by the Zimbabwe Broadcasting Corporation.

Mujuru was sworn in as Vice-president of Zimbabwe on 6 December 2004.

Mujuru was nominated as ZANU-PF's candidate for the House of Assembly seat from Mt. Darwin West in the March 2008 parliamentary election. According to official results she won the seat by an overwhelming margin, receiving 13,236 votes against 1,792 for Gora Madzudzo, the candidate of the Movement for Democratic Change (MDC) faction led by Morgan Tsvangirai. This ran contrary to earlier claims from the MDC that Mujuru had lost the seat. After the election, she was again sworn in as vice-president by Mugabe on 13 October 2008, together with Msika.

She is the subject of personal sanctions imposed by the United States.

Joice Mujuru was implicated in a 2009 attempted sale of up to 3.5 tonnes of gold from the Democratic Republic of the Congo to a European company, in contravention of European Union sanctions on the part of that company.

She currently lives on Alamein Farm, a productive and high-value operation illegally requisitioned as part of the land reform programme from Guy Watson-Smith in 2001, as found by the Zimbabwe High Court and international courts. In 2001 the Mujuru family became the subject of the first legal action against any member of Mr Mugabe's inner circle implicated in the illegal seizure of land and assets. The seizure of Alamein Farm was ruled illegal by the Supreme Court of Zimbabwe.

Mujuru was considered a potential successor to President Mugabe, competing against Emmerson Mnangagwa. She rallied support among the politburo, central committee and the presidium, and the provincial party chairs. She also garnered support from the general Zimbabwean population, indicated by the election of her loyalists to the youth league. However, her succession was expected to be challenged at the December 2014 congress, where the members of all politburo and central committee cadres were expected to seek re-election.

=== Expulsion and new political party ===
In late 2014, Mujuru was accused of plotting against Mugabe and became an outcast within ZANU-PF. She lost her positions in the party leadership at the December 2014 congress, and shortly afterward, on 8 December 2014, Mugabe dismissed her from her post as vice-president, along with ministers who were identified with her faction. In comments published on 9 December, the same day the dismissals were announced, Mujuru said that the claims that she had plotted against Mugabe were "ridiculous".

On 10 December 2014, Mugabe appointed Mujuru's long-time rival in the succession battle, Emmerson Mnangagwa, to replace her as vice-president.

Mujuru was expelled from ZANU-PF on 3 April 2015 and subsequently moved on to form the Zimbabwe People First party, in opposition to ZANU-PF. In 2017 after expelling seven senior members of the Zimbabwe People First party, she changed its name to National People's Party when the expelled members challenged ownership of the Zimbabwe People First name. Joice Mujuru signed an alliance with 20 smaller parties during the run up to the 2018 presidential election. This was believed to be a counter to Tsvangirai's MDC alliance that is to give her a large bargaining power on the coalition table. The Lucia Matibenga-led People's Democratic Party (PDP), Dumiso Dabengwa's Zapu and the NPP unveiled a coalition pact to challenge Zanu PF in Matabeleland in the 2018 elections. The Zapu, NPP and PDP leadership said they would not contest each other for any parliamentary seats in Matabeleland, before noting that "doors were still open" for a broader coalition with other opposition parties, raising fears that the MDC Alliance, which was announced recently, could have hit turbulence.

She was part of the 23 candidates that ran for the presidency.

== Positions held ==
- Minister of Community Development and Women's Affairs (1980–85)
- Minister of State in the Prime Minister's Office (1985–88)
- Minister of Community Development, Cooperatives and Women's Affairs (1988–92)
- Resident Minister and Governor for Mashonaland Central (1993–96)
- Minister of Information, Post and Telecommunication (1996–97)
- Minister of Rural Resources and Water Development (1997–2004)
- First Vice-President of Zimbabwe (2004–14)
