= Thamsanqa Mahlangu =

Zimbabwean politician (died 2015)

Thamsanqa Mahlangu (27 April 1971 – 5 October 2015) was a former MDC politician and was also the Zimbabwe Deputy Minister of Youth Development, Indigenisation and Empowerment. He was the Member of House of Assembly for Nkulumane (MDC-T).

He was also the Chairman of the MDC-T Youth wing. On 21 June 2009, he addressed youths gathered at Emakhandeni Hall commemorating the 16 June Soweto uprising. He pledged to take the issue of funding of families of youths who died due to their activism (such as Mthokozisi Ncube) to the National Council. He presented a food hamper to Ncube's Sister. The Hamper was organised by the Party's Youth Wing from Bulawayo Province led by Bekithemba Nyathi (who was also injured on the eye some years back due to political violence in Zimbabwe). Also present were orators such as Mr Reason Ngwenya (ZCTU and chairman for BuPRA, Hon Dorcus Sibanda, Desmond Makhaza, Charles Munjenjema (Student Activist), Tronix from Magwegwe and representatives from all provinces.

Thamsanqa Mahlangu attended the first ever water summit held earlier in 2009. He was instrumental in motivating youths to participate in youth activities nationally. A group known as Victory Siyanqoba (Arts Group in Nkulumane ) sang about his contributions to the youth movement in their album.

Mahlangu died on 5 October 2015 of cancer.
