= Theresa Makone =

Zimbabwean politician

The Right Honourable Theresa Makoni MP

Minister of Public Works of Zimbabwe
- Incumbent
- Assumed office 13 February 2009
- Prime Minister: Morgan Tsvangirai

Personal details
- Party: Movement for Democratic Change-Tsvangirai

Theresa Makone is the former Zimbabwe Minister of Public Works. She is the Member of House of Assembly for Harare North (MDC-T).
