= Walter Chidhakwa =

Zimbabwean politician

Walter Chidhakwa is the former Minister of Mines and Mining Development of Zimbabwe. He is the Member of House of Assembly for Zvimba South (ZANU-PF). He was arrested on 21 December 2017 and charged with criminal abuse of office regarding the Mining Ministry parastatal Minerals Marketing Corporation of Zimbabwe.
