= Joel Gabuza =

Zimbabwean politician

The Right Honourable Joel Gabuza MP

Minister of Water Resources and Development of Zimbabwe
- In office 13 February 2009 – 27 November 2013
- Prime Minister: Morgan Tsvangirai

Personal details
- Party: Movement for Democratic Change-Tsvangirai

Joel Gabuza was the Zimbabwe Minister of Water Resources and Development from 2009 during the Government of National Unity formed between the ruling ZanuPF and the opposition, and held office until 2013 when a new cabinet was appointed, and Oppah Muchinguri-Kashiri was appointed as the new Minister of Water and Climate. He is the Member of House of Assembly for Binga (MDC-T).

On 27 November 2017, Emmerson Mnangagwa, who succeeded ousted President Robert Mugabe following the 2017 Zimbabwe coup d'etat, announced the dissolution of the Zimbabwe Cabinet, leaving only Patrick Chinamasa and Simbarashe Mumbengegwi as acting ministers of Finance and Foreign Affairs respectively. A new cabinet of re-structured ministries was appointed on 30 November 2017, and Oppah Muchinguri-Kashiri was re-appointed as the new Minister of Environment, Water and Climate. Joel Gabuza remains the MDC-T Member of Parliament for Binga.
