= Eric Matinenga =

Zimbabwean case lawyer and politician

The Honourable Eric Matinenga MP

Minister of Constitutional and Parliamentary Affairs of Zimbabwe
- Incumbent
- Assumed office 13 February 2009
- Prime Minister: Morgan Tsvangirai

Personal details
- Party: Movement for Democratic Change-Tsvangirai
- Profession: Advocate

Eric Matinenga is a Zimbabwean case lawyer and politician who successfully defended Movement for Democratic Change (MDC) leader Morgan Tsvangirai during his treason trial in 2005. He was elected in 2008 as the MP for Buhera West, defeating the Zimbabwe African National Union – Patriotic Front's (ZANU-PF) candidate Tapiwa Zengeya.

He has been arrested several times by the police. He was most recently arrested on 7 June 2008, after having been previously released from police custody on 5 June; both arrests were for charges of inciting violence.

On 10 February 2009, Tsvangirai designated Matinenga for the position of Minister of Constitutional and Parliamentary Affairs as part of the national unity government.
