= Welshman Ncube =

Zimbabwean politician, lawyer and businessman (born 1961)

The Right Honourable Welshman Ncube
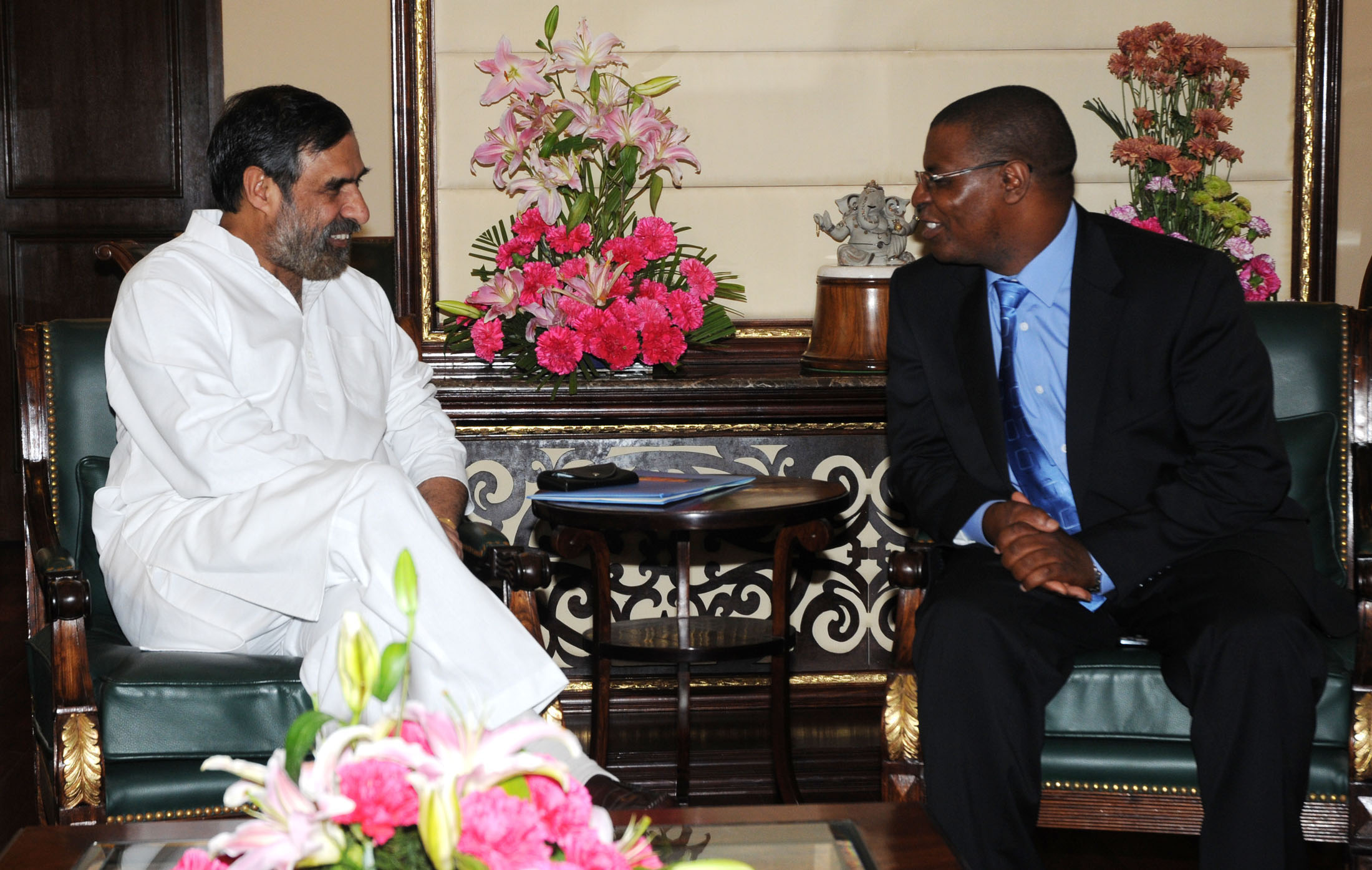
- Ncube (right) in 2011

Minister of Industry and Commerce
- In office 13 February 2009 – 2013*
- President: Robert Mugabe
- Preceded by: Obert Mpofu
- Succeeded by: Michael Bimha

Vice President of the Citizens Coalition for Change
- Incumbent
- Assumed office 2022*
- Leader: Nelson Chamisa
- Preceded by: Position Established

Personal details
- Born: 7 July 1961 (age 65) Gwelo, Southern Rhodesia (now Gweru, Zimbabwe)
- Party: Movement for Democratic Change – Ncube (2005–2018); Citizens Coalition for Change Change (2022–present)
- Education: University of Zimbabwe
- *Exact dates unknown

Welshman Ncube (born 7 July 1961) is a Zimbabwean lawyer, businessman and politician. He is the founding MDC leader and former President of Zimbabwean political party Movement for Democratic Change – Ncube. He currently serves within the Citizen Coalition for Change (CCC). He is a practicing lawyer in the firm Mathonsi Ncube Law Chambers, where he is the senior partner at their Bulawayo offices. He also runs a number of business ventures, including a farm in the Midlands Province.

== Background ==
Ncube served as a member of the House of Assembly of Zimbabwe for 13 years, from 2000 to 2013, and held the position of Minister for Industry and Commerce from 2009 to 2013. During his tenure, he was known for his efforts to revitalize Zimbabwe's industrial sector and promote economic development in the country.

An academic and civil rights lecturer at the University of Zimbabwe Faculty of Law—his alma mater—Ncube gained prominence in 1992 when he was appointed as a professor at the age of 31. His work in academia and advocacy positioned him as a key figure in Zimbabwean politics. He was one of the founding members of the Movement for Democratic Change (MDC), playing an influential role in shaping the party's policies and strategies.

Ncube was instrumental in the negotiations of the Global Political Agreement (GPA) that led to the formation of the Zimbabwean Government of National Unity (GNU) in 2009. In this administration, he was appointed as the Minister of Industry and Commerce, where he worked to address the challenges facing Zimbabwe's economy, including efforts to improve trade and investment. Ncube also chaired the COMESA (Common Market for Eastern and Southern Africa) Council of Ministers, where he was involved in regional economic cooperation initiatives.

== Early life ==
Ncube was born on 7 July 1961 in Gwelo, Rhodesia. The fourth of eight children, he was raised in the rural Maboleni district by his peasant parents. At school, he did well academically and in sporting pursuits such as athletics and football.

=== Education ===
Ncube attended Mzilikazi High School in Bulawayo, where he graduated with straight 'A's. He gained LLB and MPhil Law degrees from the University of Zimbabwe. His MPhil thesis was on Zimbabwean Customary Law, focusing on Family Law.

== Minister of Commerce and Industry ==
Ncube became the Minister of Industry and Commerce in the Inclusive Government from February 2009 to July 2013 and in that capacity chaired the COMESA Council of Ministers during 2010 and 2011. He was also the country's representative at the EU ACP Council of Ministers during his stint in government. He also served in the SADC Council of Ministers and the SADC, COMESA and EAC Tripartite Council of Ministers.

=== Distressed and Marginalized Areas Fund (Dimaf) ===
In his capacity as the Minister of Commerce and Industry, Ncube sourced funds amounting to US$40 million from the international community to revitalize distressed companies in marginalized areas. CABS Bank was the government's disbursing partner, out of 60 companies that applied for the fund only 3 received the funding due to tight regulations and rules. Despite Ncube's directive to CABS bank to relax the rules and regulations so that more companies could benefit from the fund, CABS defied his directive and as a result the companies that re-applied still did not meet the minimum requirements. The debate about the fund continued until CABS deposited the money back into government's bank account.

=== Essar deal ===
Ncube signed a deal with Essar Steel that would allow the Indian steel giant to rehabilitate the existing obsolete equipment of Zisco Steel. The success of this deal would provide for over 500 people to be employed. However, the deal failed due to a lack of clearance and consent from other ministries was required. In fear that Ncube would be looked to provide solutions to solve Zimbabwe's high unemployment rate, ZANU PF ministers refused to grant the need clearance. In 2015 the new government reopened negotiations with Essar. The government and Essar Africa Holdings agreed on an improved Zimbabwe Iron and Steel Company (Ziscosteel) deal, providing for a complete overhaul of the company's equipment that has been lying idle for years.

== Political career ==
Before he was elected President of the MDC in 2011, Ncube had been its Secretary General from 2000 to 2011. He served as a Member of Parliament of Zimbabwe from June 2000 until March 2008. During his time in Parliament he served in various committees including the Standing Orders and Rules Committee and the Parliamentary Legal Committee- which he chaired between 2004 and 2008.

Ncube was very active in civic society where he was a founding member of the Zimbabwe Human Rights Association (Zim-Rights); Zimbabwe Lawyers for Human Rights; the National Constitutional Assembly (NCA) where he was the Spokesperson between 1998 and 2000; Women and Law in Southern Africa and Amani Trust.

When Ncube took over the leadership of the MDC in February 2011, his party nominated him to replace Professor Arthur Mutambara as the Deputy Minister in the Inclusive Government. Robert Mugabe refused to swear him in as Deputy Prime Minister.

Ncube ran as his party's presidential candidate in the highly disputed July 2013 harmonized elections and came third after Robert Mugabe and Morgan Tsvangirai.

Ncube has been regarded by political commentators as an influential figure in Zimbabwean politics, particularly for his role in negotiations during the Government of National Unity (GNU). Members of the GNU cabinet, including Education Minister David Coltart, were noted for introducing reforms and policy initiatives in their respective ministries. Ncube has also been associated with advocating constitutionalism, dialogue and non-violent political engagement.

Ncube is perceived by Zimbabwean media to be pro-Mugabe.

== Honors ==
- He has been awarded honorary doctorates from the Faculty of Law, University of Oslo, Norway.
