= Paurina Mpariwa =

Zimbabwean politician

The Right Honourable Paurina Mpariwa MP

Minister of Labour and Social Welfare of Zimbabwe
- Incumbent
- Assumed office 13 February 2009
- Prime Minister: Morgan Tsvangirai

Personal details
- Party: Movement for Democratic Change-Tsvangirai

Paurina Gwanyanya Mpariwa (born 1964), sometimes written as Paurine Mpariwa, is a member of the Pan-African Parliament from Zimbabwe. Mpariwa is the chair of the Public Accounts Committee.

She is also a member of the Parliament of Zimbabwe, first elected in 2000 and again in 2005, representing the Mukafose constituency in Harare. She is a member of the Movement for Democratic Change (MDC) party. On 10 February 2009, Morgan Tsvangirai designated Mpariwa for the position of Minister of Labour and Social Welfare as part of the national unity government. She is the Member of House of Assembly for Mufakose (MDC-T).

Mpariwa was also chairperson for Women's Parliamentary Caucus, chairperson Women in Law and Development in Africa (WILDAF), Zimbabwe Parliament Treasurer Women Caucus, parliamentary deputy chairperson Portfolio for Labour, parliamentary deputy whip, Pan African Parliament rapporteur for health, labour and social welfare.

== Life ==
Born in Mufakose 1964, Paurina Mpariwa trained in personnel management, industrial relations, business studies, para-legal work, social work finance and computers.

== Unionism ==
Participation in labour unionism started while working at OK chain stores early 1990s, rising to become the chairperson for the Commercial Workers' Union of Zimbabwe.
