= Gorden Moyo =

Zimbabwean politician

Gorden Moyo was the Minister of State Enterprises and Parastatals in the Government of the Republic of Zimbabwe; he was appointed to this post following a reshuffle of MDC-T Ministers in the Cabinet by MDC-T President and Prime Minister Morgan Tsvangirai in June 2010.

== Political career ==
Prior to June 2010, Gorden Moyo was the Minister of State in the Prime Minister's Office. He was minister up to 31 July 2013, at the end of the government of national Unity (GNU). He was voted in as member of Parliament for Makokoba constituency in 2008 and reelected in 2013 on MDC-T ticket. He was recalled from parliament after breaking away from Tsvangirai in March 2015 along with 21 other MPs, including former secretary general Tendai Biti. He is the current Secretary General of the People's Democratic Party (PDP), a breakaway party from MDC-T with Tendai Biti as president.
