= Arthur Mutambara =

Zimbabwean politician

The Right Honourable Arthur Mutambara
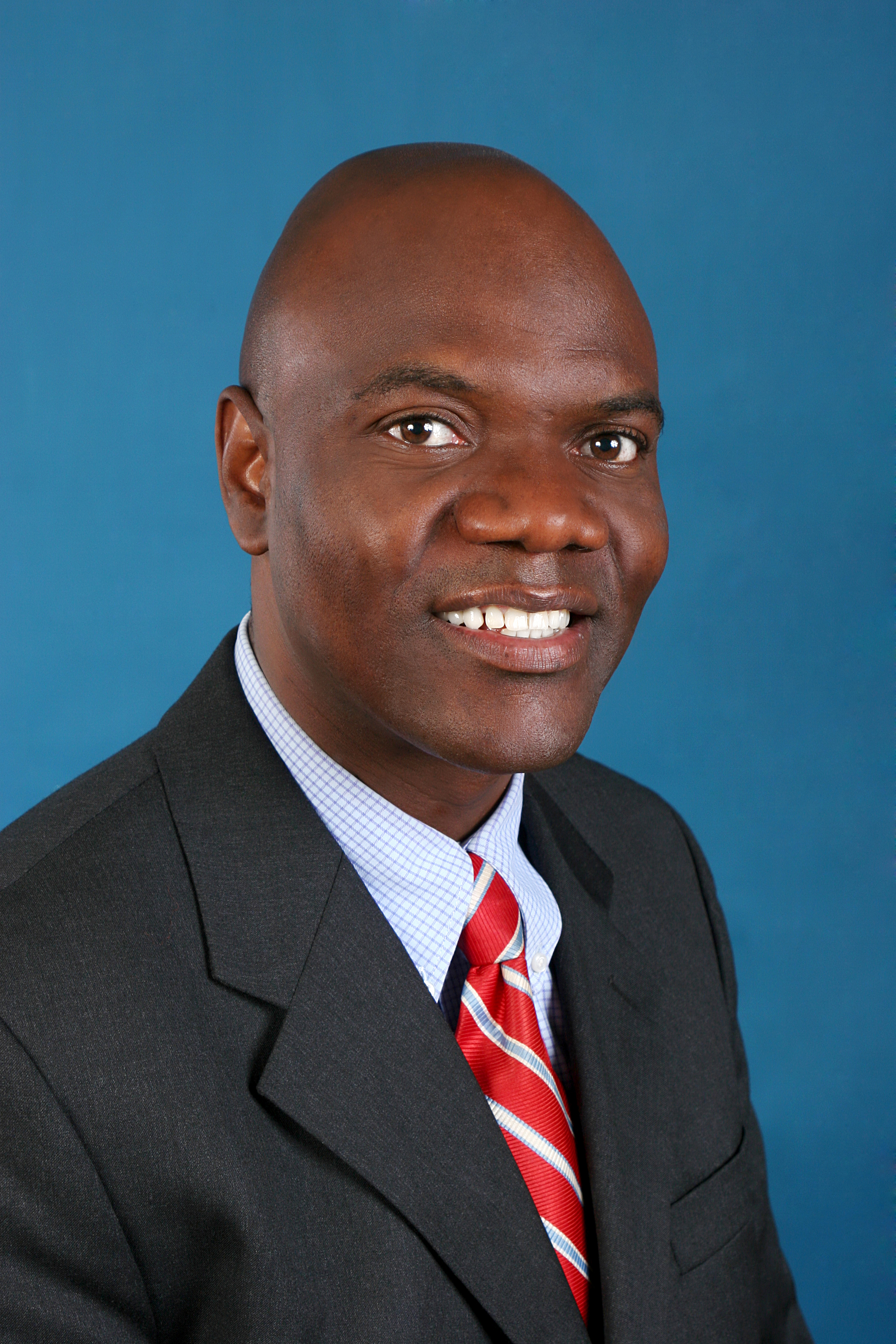

Institute for the Future of Knowledge (University of Johannesburg)
- Incumbent
- Assumed office 2021

Personal details
- Born: Arthur Guseni Oliver Mutambara; 25 May 1966 (age 60) Rhodesia
- Education: University of Zimbabwe; Merton College, Oxford
- Occupation: Full professor
- Profession: Professor

Arthur G.O. Mutambara is an academic and technology expert currently serving as the director and full professor of the Institute for the Future of Knowledge (IFK) at the University of Johannesburg (UJ) in South Africa.

At IFK, Mutambara leads the Decentralized Artificial Intelligence and Control Systems (DAICS) Research Group. He also spearheads the African Agency in Public Health (AAPH) initiative within the Future of Health (FoH) Research Group. In addition to his involvement in academic groups, Professor Mutambara is involved in teaching Control Systems at both UJ's Mechanical Engineering and Electrical and Electronic Engineering Departments.

== Early activism ==
Prior to his academic pursuits, Mutambara held significant political roles, including serving as the Former Deputy Prime Minister of Zimbabwe. Throughout his tenure, he played a central role in establishing and guiding the Government of National Unity (GNU), serving as one of its three Principals alongside the late former Prime Minister Morgan Tsvangirai and the late former President Robert Mugabe from 2009 to 2013. As Deputy Prime Minister, his responsibilities encompassed vital tasks such as advising the Prime Minister on policy formulation within the Cabinet and overseeing policy implementation through the Council of Ministers. Additionally, he provided direct supervision to ministries under the Infrastructure Cluster, which included pivotal sectors like Energy and Power Development, Transport and Infrastructure, Information Communication Technologies, Water Resources and Development, and Public Works. Professor Mutambara facilitated collaborative regional policy efforts within these domains across SADC and COMESA. Furthermore, he spearheaded three national initiatives for the GNU: crafting a Shared National Vision, executing the Rebranding of Zimbabwe campaign, and crafting a comprehensive National Infrastructure Master Plan. In the United States, Mutambara was a Research Scientist at the National Aeronautic and Space Administration (NASA), visiting professor at the Massachusetts Institute of Technology (MIT), a visiting professor at the Carnegie Mellon University's Robotics Institute, and a professor at the Florida Agricultural and Mechanical University – Florida State University (FAMU-FSU) College of Engineering. In his academic research and teaching, he has received outstanding reviews and praise from students and peers worldwide. Professor Mutambara was also a Management Consultant with McKinsey & Company in Chicago and the Director of Electronic Payments at Standard Bank in South Africa.

Mutambara is a Chartered Engineer, a Fellow of the Institution of Engineering and Technology (IET), a Professional Engineer, a Fellow of the Zimbabwe Institution of Engineers (ZIE), a Fellow of the Zimbabwe Academy of Sciences (ZAS), and a Senior Member of the Institute of Electrical and Electronics Engineers (IEEE).

== Scholarly output ==
Mutambara has penned six books spanning various disciplines. Among these, he has contributed three significant works in electrical engineering, which are widely employed in both undergraduate and graduate engineering programs across the United States, Europe, China, Japan, and Africa. These influential texts include "Decentralized Estimation and Control for Multisensor Systems" (1998), "Design and Analysis of Control Systems" (1999), and "Driving the Fourth Industrial Revolution (4IR): Design and Analysis of Control Systems" (2024).

Beyond his contributions to engineering literature, Mutambara has authored three additional books focusing on Thought Leadership. These volumes delve into diverse topics, starting with "In Search of the Elusive Zimbabwean Dream Volume I: The Formative Years and the Big Wide World (1983–2002)." The series continues with "Volume II: The Path to Power (2003–2009)" and concludes with "Volume III: Ideas & Solutions: Deputy Prime Minister and Beyond (2009–2023)."

== Movement for Democratic Change ==
In 2005 the MDC split into two factions following a dispute over whether or not to participate in the March 2005 senatorial election. While MDC leader Morgan Tsvangirai, Mutambara, and others opposed participation, Welshman Ncube and Gibson Sibanda led a faction that favored participation. Those supporting the senate elections won narrowly against the leader Morgan Tsvangirai's vote. Tsvangirai later overruled and overturned the decision of the plebiscite citing two absent members had sent in postal votes that canceled the slender margin.

In February 2006 at a Congress of the breakaway faction Movement for Democratic Change, Mutambara was elected as president of the party. Commenting on the election, Mutambara said, "My position was that the MDC should have boycotted those Senate elections. I guess then that makes me the anti-Senate leader of the pro-Senate MDC faction. How ridiculous can we get? That debate is now in the past, let us move on and unite our people."

The choice of Mutambara as leader was said to have been inspired by the fact that he is a Shona whereas Sibanda and Ncube are both Ndebele, but realised that only a Shona candidate could win an election across the whole of Zimbabwe. Mutambara is not a member of the House of Assembly.

The faction led by Tsvangirai described Mutambara's election as a nullity. In his MDC faction presidential acceptance speech, Mutambara stated, "We believe that our views on land reform in Zimbabwe are different from those of Western governments. Our approach is not driven by the interests of white farmers, but by those of all Zimbabweans, white and black. While we put the failure of the land reform program squarely on the ZANU–PF government, we also acknowledge the complicity of some Western governments which reneged on agreements, and the inertia of white farmers in seeking pre-emptive solutions." However, David Karimanzira, a leading member of the ZANU–PF, alleged that Mutambara was promoted by the West after Western governments decided not to continue backing Morgan Tsvangirai because the Zimbabwean people had allegedly rejected his party manifesto. He once called the African Union a "club of dictators".

Mutambara was arrested by the Zimbabwe police on 19 May 2006 while leading a march in support of his faction's candidate on the eve of the Budiriro by-election. He was also arrested on 11 March together with other MDC leaders from the other faction. He was released without charge two days later, only to be re-arrested on 18 March at Harare Airport en route to South Africa, where his family is still based, and where he is also a leading consultant. He was also released without charge after three days in custody.

=== 2008 presidential election ===
After Mutambara and Tsvangirai failed to unite on a single MDC candidate for the March 2008 presidential election, Mutambara said on 15 February that he would not run for president and that his faction would instead back Simba Makoni. Mutambara instead ran in the concurrent parliamentary election for a seat from the Zengeza East constituency, but he was placed third, with 1,322 votes, according to official results, behind the candidate of the Tsvangirai faction, who won 7,570 votes, and the ZANU–PF candidate, who won 3,042 votes.

The Tsvangirai faction won 99 seats in the parliamentary election and the Mutambara faction won 10, compared with 97 for ZANU–PF. On 28 April 2008, Mutambara and Tsvangirai announced that their factions were reuniting, thus enabling the MDC to have a clear parliamentary majority.

On 1 June 2008, Mutambara was arrested at his home in Harare. According to his lawyer, the arrest was due to an article he wrote in The Standard in April, which allegedly included "falsehoods" and "contempt of court". In this article, he blamed Mugabe for the state of the economy and accused the security forces of committing abuses. On 3 June, Mutambara was released on a bail of 20 million Zimbabwean dollars but he did not go to jail, with the next court date being set for 17 June. After the hearing on 3 June, he described his own suffering as minor compared to that of the people, saying that Mugabe's "human rights violations" would fail and vowing, "We will triumph over evil."

=== SADC facilitated power-sharing agreement ===
On 15 September 2008, the leaders of the 14-member Southern African Development Community witnessed the signing of a power-sharing agreement between the two MDC factions and ZANU-PF. Under the deal, Mugabe remained president, Tsvangirai became prime minister, the MDC controlled the police, ZANU-PF controlled the Army, and Mutambara became deputy prime minister.

=== Notable Speech ===
On his visit to South Africa during a book launch in the month of June, 2023. Mutambara gave prominence to his democratic advocacies', by boldy, insinuating that "Africa needs new leadership" during an oration.

Party political offices
New political party Party split between MDC and MDC-T	Leader of the Movement for Democratic Change-Mutambara; 2005–present	Incumbent
