= Movement for Democratic Change – Ncube =

Zimbabwean political party

Movement for Democratic Change
- Leader: Welshman Ncube
- Founded: October 2005
- Dissolved: 2018
- Split from: Movement for Democratic Change
- Merged into: Movement for Democratic Change – Alliance
- Youth wing: MDC National Youth Assembly
- Women's wing: MDC National Women Assembly
- Ideology: Democratic socialism Social democracy Pan-Africanism
- Political position: Centre-left
- Colours: Green

Website
- Official website

The Movement for Democratic Change – Ncube (MDC–N) was a Zimbabwean political party led by politician and attorney Welshman Ncube. It was founded in 2005 when the Movement for Democratic Change split apart and in the 2008 general election, it was known as the Movement for Democratic Change – Mutambara (MDC–M) in contrast to the larger Movement for Democratic Change – Tsvangirai (MDC–T). The MDC–N and the MDC–T operated as separate opposition parties until their re-unification in 2018. The re-united party now operates under the original name, the MDC.

== Foundation ==
The Movement for Democratic Change (MDC) was founded in 1999 as an opposition party to the Zimbabwe African National Union – Patriotic Front (ZANU-PF) party led by President Robert Mugabe. The MDC was formed from many members of the broad coalition of civic society groups and individuals that campaigned for a "No" vote in the 2000 constitutional referendum, in particular the Zimbabwe Congress of Trade Unions. The MDC is thus a Social Movement not a political party. It was formed out of a social consensus hence its diverse ideological strands. Social Democracy became a uniting ideology for all the various groups who formed the MDC.

== Party Split ==
Following the 2005 Senate election, the party had internal divisions whether to participate in the Senate or not. There was no consensus in the party's National Executive. The National Council convened in Harare at Harvest on 12 October 2005 and voted for participation after secret ballot. Morgan Tsvangirai did not accept the result decision of the National Council and was finally expelled by the National Council on 6 January 2006.

== Inter-formation violence ==
In July 2006, after attending a political meeting in the Harare suburb of Mabvuku, MP Trudy Stevenson was attacked and suffered panga wounds to the back of her neck and head. The MDC leadership immediately claimed that the attack was carried out by ZANU militants. However, while recovering in hospital, Stevenson identified her assailants as members of a rival faction of the MDC.

== 2008 presidential election ==
In the 2008 presidential election, the President of MDC Prof Arthur Mutambara backed Simba Makoni.

== 2018 election and the re-unification of the MDC ==
In the lead up to the 2018 Zimbabwean general election, the MDC-N joined an electoral coalition with Movement for Democratic Change – Tsvangirai (MDC–T) and other political parties which was called the MDC Alliance. After that election, the MDC-N, the PDP and the MDC-T re-united under the original party name, the MDC.

== Notable party members ==
- Welshman Ncube, President and Minister of Industry and Commerce
- Edwin Mushoriwa, Vice-President
- David Coltart, Senator for Khumalo Constituency and Minister of Education, Sport and Culture
- Ngqabutho Nicholas Dube, National Executive Council Member; Member of Parliament for Umzingwane
- Priscilla Misihairabwi, Secretary General and Minister of Regional Integration and International Co-operation
- Discent Bajila, Secretary General MDC Youth Assembly and Member of Parliament for Matobo South
- Miriam Mushayi, Director of Strategy
- Khumbu Malinga, Youth Assembly Spokesperson
