= List of diplomatic missions of Zimbabwe =

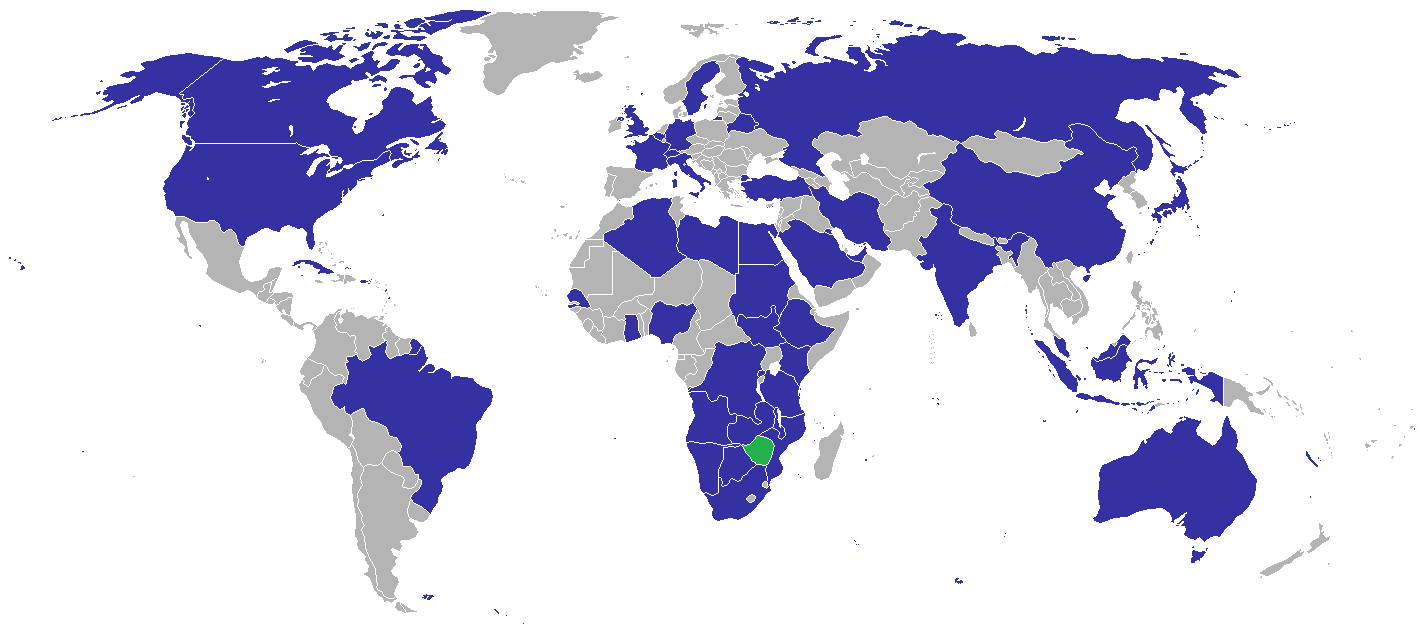
Diplomatic missions of Zimbabwe

This is a list of diplomatic missions of Zimbabwe, excluding honorary consulates.

Following Ian Smith's Unilateral Declaration of Independence from the United Kingdom in 1965 Rhodesia's diplomatic presence was dramatically rolled back across the world. By the time of the Lancaster House Agreement in 1979 Rhodesia only had representative offices in London, Bonn, Pretoria, Washington, D.C., and Tokyo. Missions in Maputo (then Lourenço Marques) and Lisbon were closed in 1975 following the Carnation Revolution in Portugal. Under Robert Mugabe Zimbabwe ran a new foreign policy which operated more closely with African, Soviet and NAM states.

== Current missions ==
=== Africa ===
Host country	Host city	Mission	Head of mission	Concurrent accreditation	Ref.
Algeria	Algiers	Embassy	Vusumuzi Ntonga		
Angola	Luanda	Embassy	Thando Madzvamuse		
Botswana	Gaborone	Embassy	Batiraishe Henry Mukonoweshuro	Multilateral Organizations: Southern African Development Community	
Congo-Kinshasa	Kinshasa	Embassy	D. Sigauke		
Congo-Kinshasa	Lubumbashi	Consulate-General	R. M. Chimheno		
Egypt	Cairo	Embassy	Shebba Shumbayaonda	Countries: Israel; Lebanon; Oman	
Equatorial Guinea	Malabo	Embassy	V.J. Mutumhe		
Ethiopia	Addis Ababa	Embassy	Taonga Mushayavanhu	Countries: Djibouti; Multilateral Organizations: African Union; United Nations Economic Commission for Africa	
Ghana	Accra	Embassy	Kufa Edward Chinoza	Countries: Burkina Faso; Ivory Coast; Liberia; Sierra Leone; Togo	
Kenya	Nairobi	Embassy	Winipeg Moyo	Countries: Somalia; Uganda; Multilateral Organizations: United Nations; United Nations Environment Programme; United Nations Human Settlements Programme	
Malawi	Lilongwe	Embassy	N. Saungweme		
Mozambique	Maputo	Embassy	V. Matemadanda	Countries: Eswatini	
Mozambique	Beira	Consulate-General	Malvern Munetsi Bere	Countries: Eswatini	
Namibia	Windhoek	Embassy	M. Chaurura		
Nigeria	Abuja	Embassy	Maxwell Ranga	Countries: Benin; Cameroon; Niger; São Tomé and Príncipe	
Rwanda	Kigali	Embassy	Charity Manyeruke	Countries: Burundi; Central African Republic	
Senegal	Dakar	Embassy	James Maridadi	Countries: Cape Verde; Gambia; Guinea; Guinea-Bissau; Mali	
South Africa	Pretoria	Embassy	L. Mazemo	Countries: Lesotho; Madagascar; Mauritius; Seychelles	
South Africa	Johannesburg	Consulate-General	Eria Phiri	Countries: Lesotho; Madagascar; Mauritius; Seychelles	
South Africa	Cape Town	Consulate	Vacant	Countries: Lesotho; Madagascar; Mauritius; Seychelles	
South Sudan	Juba	Embassy	K. Mupezeni		
Sudan	Khartoum	Embassy	Emmanuel Runganga Gumbo	Countries: Chad; Eritrea	
Tanzania	Dar es Salaam	Embassy	H.B. Dingani	Countries: Comoros	
Zambia	Lusaka	Embassy	Charity Angelina Charamba	Multilateral Organizations: Common Market for Eastern and Southern Africa	

=== Americas ===
Host country	Host city	Mission	Head of mission	Concurrent accreditation	Ref.
Brazil	Brasília	Embassy	M. Kitchen	Countries: Ecuador; Paraguay; Peru; Uruguay	
Canada	Ottawa	Embassy	Cecil Toendepi Chinenere	Countries: Belize; Trinidad and Tobago	
Cuba	Havana	Embassy	P.R. Mutasa	Countries: Bahamas; Dominican Republic; Guatemala; Guyana; Haiti; Honduras; Jamaica; Nicaragua; Suriname	
United States	Washington, D.C.	Embassy	D. Hamadziripi	Countries: Costa Rica; Mexico; Panama; Multilateral Organizations: World Bank Group	

=== Asia ===
Host country	Host city	Mission	Head of mission	Concurrent accreditation	Ref.
China	Beijing	Embassy	A. Shonhiwa		
China	Hong Kong	Consulate-General	Ellias Mutamba		
India	New Delhi	Embassy	S. Nkomo	Countries: Bangladesh; Bhutan; Maldives; Myanmar; Nepal; Sri Lanka	
Indonesia	Jakarta	Embassy	M. Makururu	Countries: Laos; Singapore; Timor-Leste; Multilateral Organizations: Association of Southeast Asian Nations (Note: Accredited as an observer mission.)	
Iran	Tehran	Embassy	Bright Kupemba	Countries: Afghanistan; Armenia; Syria; Turkmenistan	
Japan	Tokyo	Embassy	S. Nyakotyo	Countries: South Korea	
Kuwait	Kuwait City	Embassy	Chrispen Toga Mavodza	Countries: Bahrain; Jordan; Qatar; Yemen	
Malaysia	Kuala Lumpur	Embassy	Constance Chemwayi	Countries: Brunei; Cambodia; Philippines; Thailand; Vietnam	
Pakistan	Islamabad	Embassy	T.M.J. Abu-Basutu		
Saudi Arabia	Riyadh	Embassy	Jonathan Wutawunashe		
Turkey	Ankara	Embassy	Alfred Mutiwazuka	Countries: Palestine	
United Arab Emirates	Abu Dhabi	Embassy	Isaac Aaron Moyo		
United Arab Emirates	Dubai	Consulate-General	Never Mutizwa		

=== Europe ===
Host country	Host city	Mission	Head of mission	Concurrent accreditation	Ref.
Belarus	Minsk	Embassy	Ignatius Graham Mudzimba		
Belgium	Brussels	Embassy	A.M. Mutembwa	Countries: Luxembourg; Netherlands; Multilateral Organizations: European Union; Organisation for the Prohibition of Chemical Weapons	
France	Paris	Embassy	Sekai Nzenza-Shand	Countries: Holy See; Portugal; Spain; Multilateral Organizations: UNESCO; UN Tourism	
Germany	Berlin	Embassy	Alice Mashingaidze	Countries: Bulgaria; Hungary; Poland; Romania; Slovenia; Switzerland; Ukraine	
Italy	Rome	Embassy	Mietani Chauke	Countries: Croatia; Cyprus; Georgia; Greece; Malta; San Marino; Serbia; Multilateral Organizations: Food and Agriculture Organization; International Fund for Agricultural Development; World Food Programme	
Russia	Moscow	Embassy	Mike Nicholas Sango	Countries: Azerbaijan; Kazakhstan; Moldova; Tajikistan; Uzbekistan	
Sweden	Stockholm	Embassy	P. Misihairabwi-Mushonga	Countries: Denmark; Estonia; Finland; Latvia; Lithuania; Norway	
United Kingdom	London	Embassy	Christian Katsande	Countries: Ireland; Multilateral Organizations: International Maritime Organization	

=== Oceania ===
Host country	Host city	Mission	Head of mission	Concurrent accreditation	Ref.
Australia	Canberra	Embassy	Joe Tapera Mhishi	Countries: New Zealand	

=== Multilateral organisations ===
Organization	Host city	Host country	Mission	Head of mission	Concurrent accreditation	Ref.
United Nations	New York City	United States	Permanent Mission	T. Mushayavanhu		
United Nations	Geneva	Switzerland	Permanent Mission	E. Mlilo	Countries: Austria; Czechia; Slovakia; Multilateral Organizations: International Committee of the Red Cross; International Labour Organization; International Organization for Migration; UN Trade and Development; World Health Organization; World Meteorological Organization; World Trade Organization	

== Gallery ==
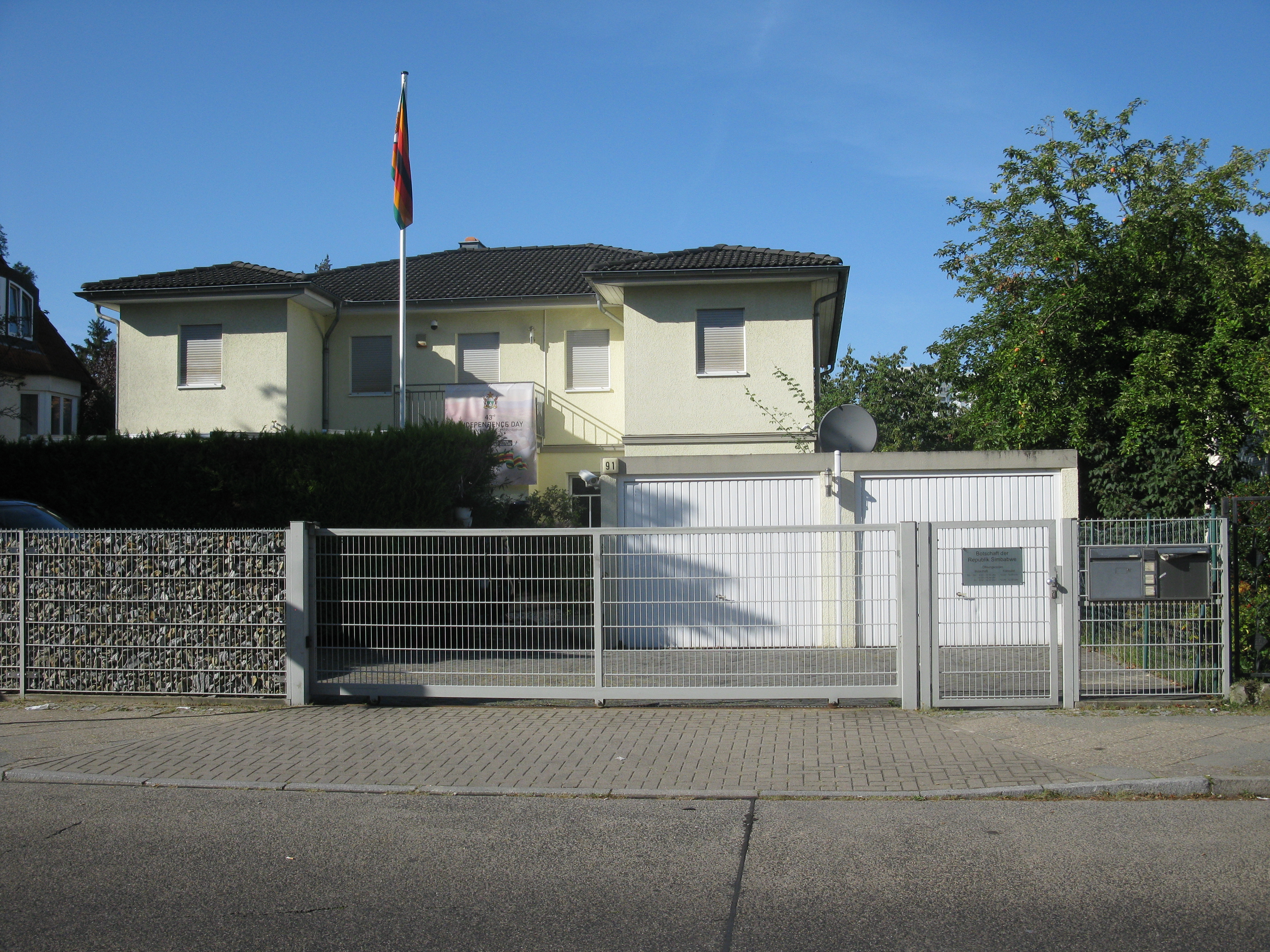
Embassy in Berlin

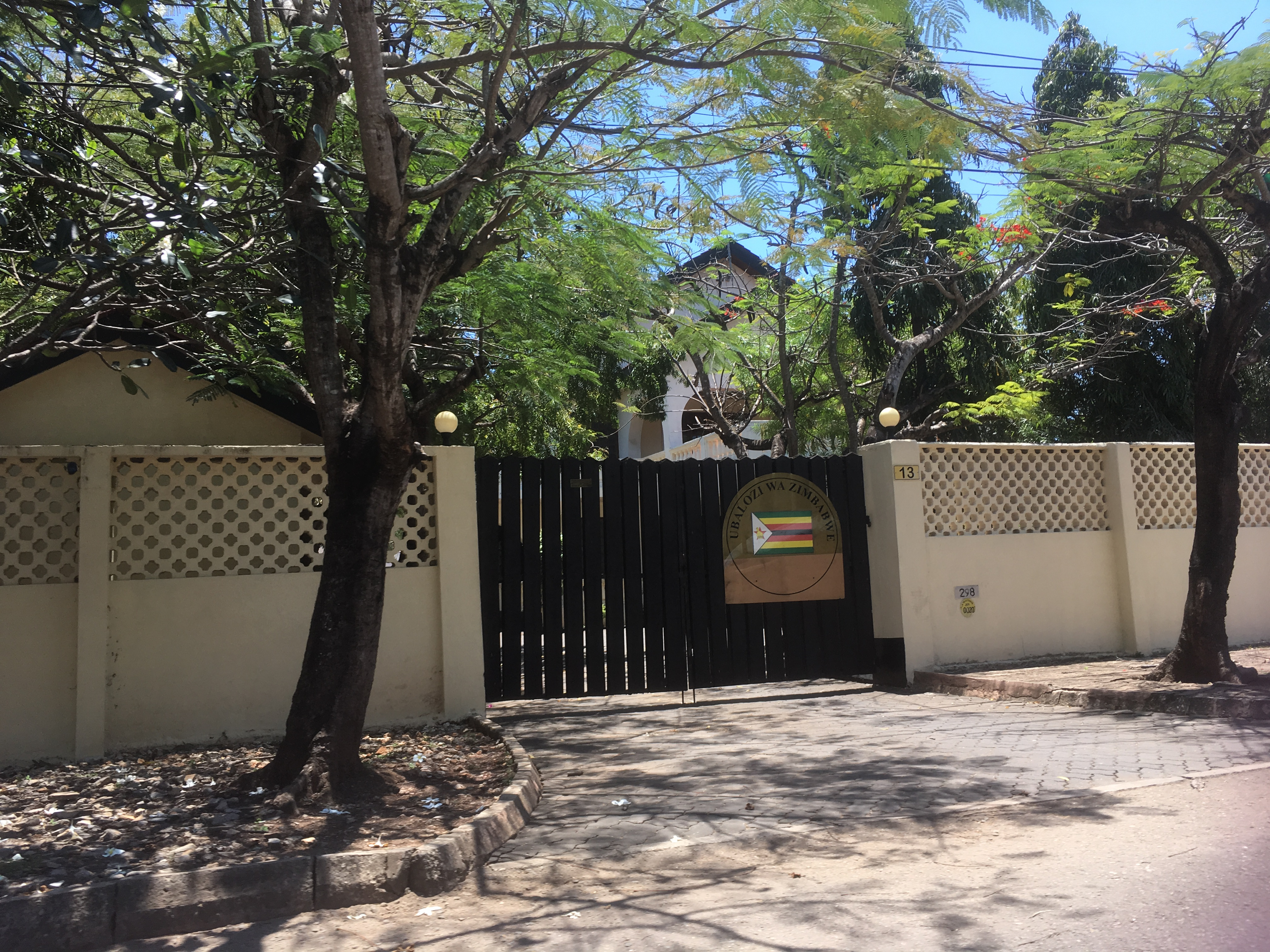
Embassy in Dar es Salaam

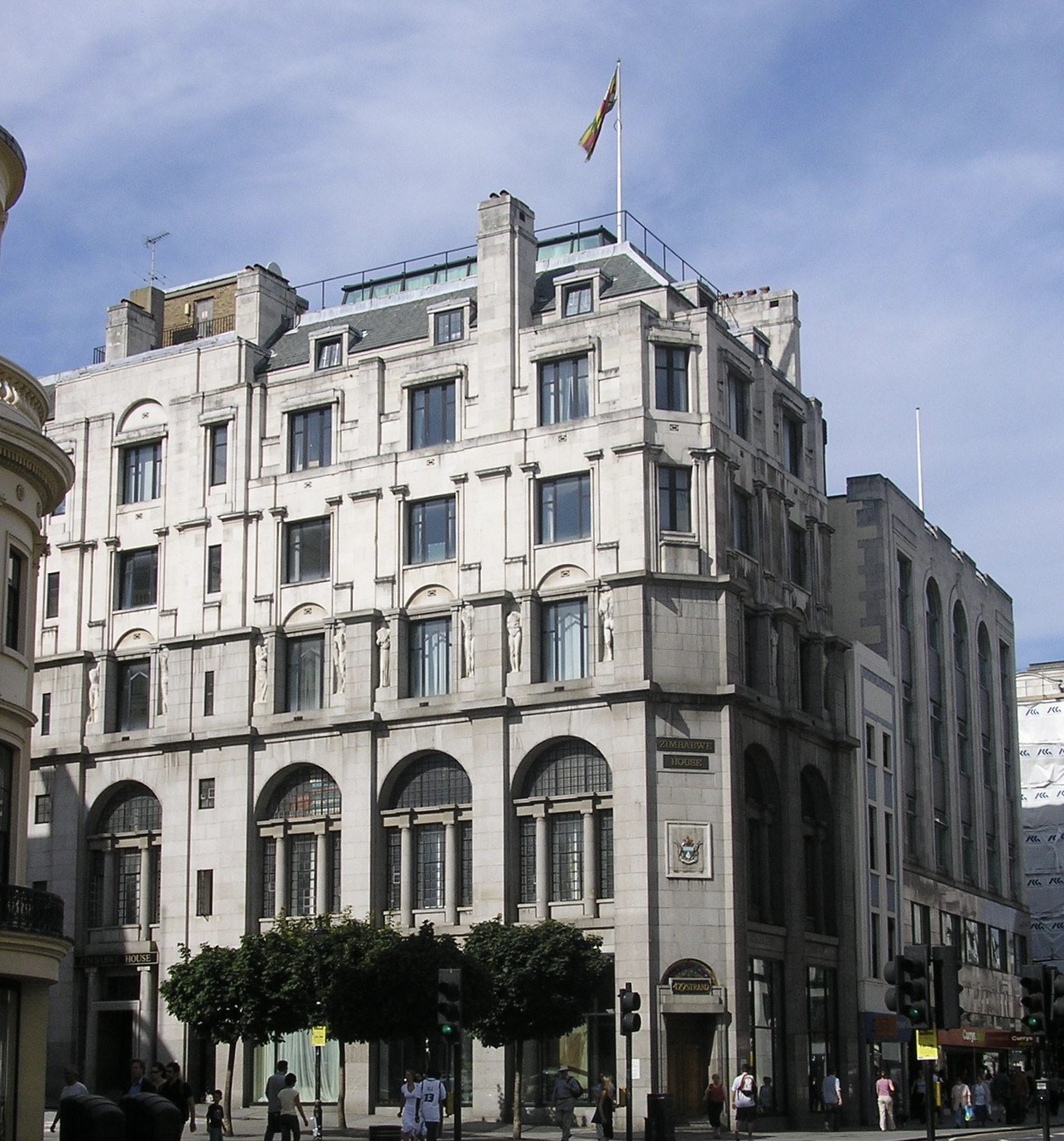
Embassy in London

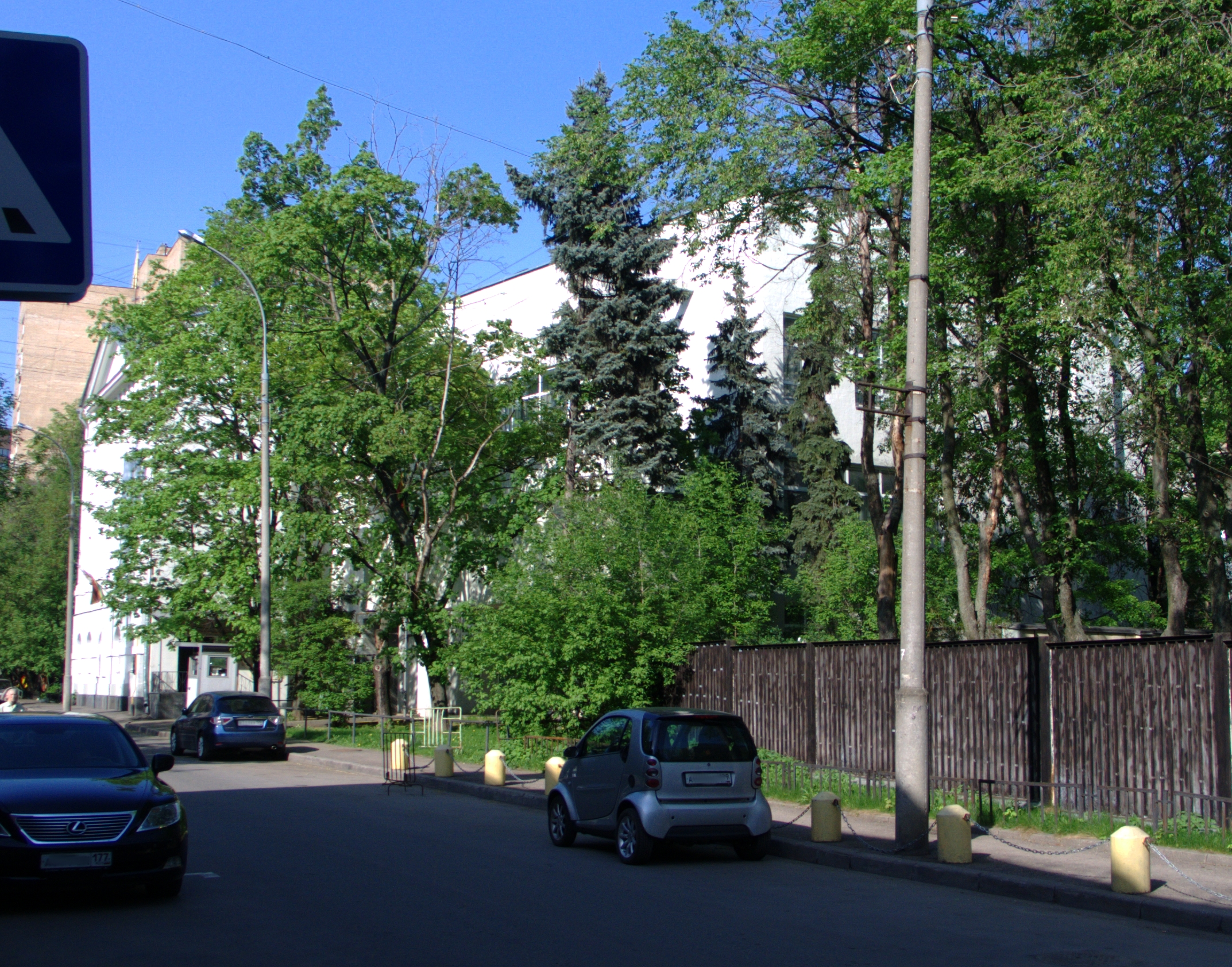
Embassy in Moscow

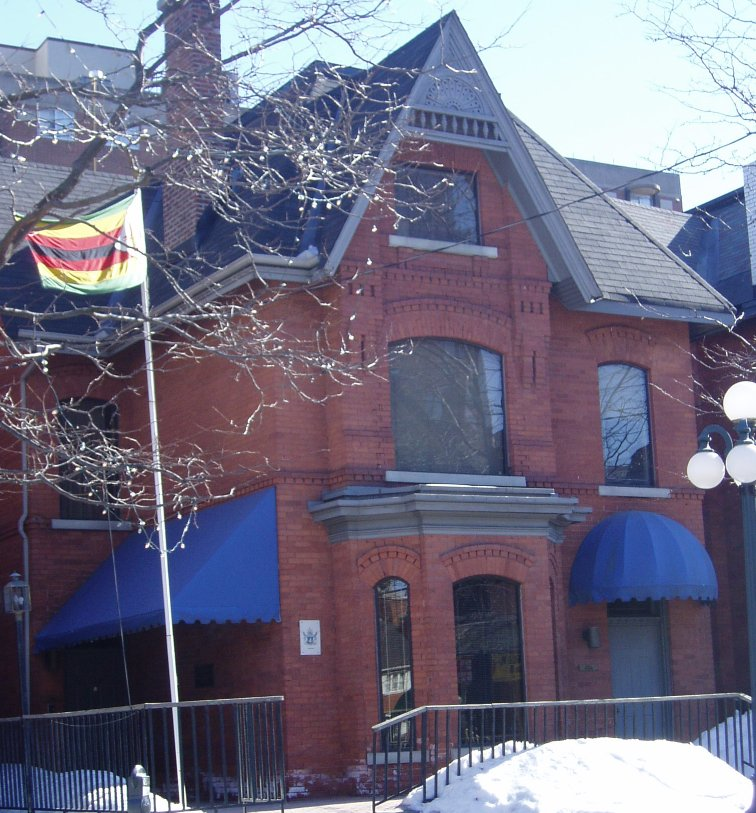
Embassy in Ottawa

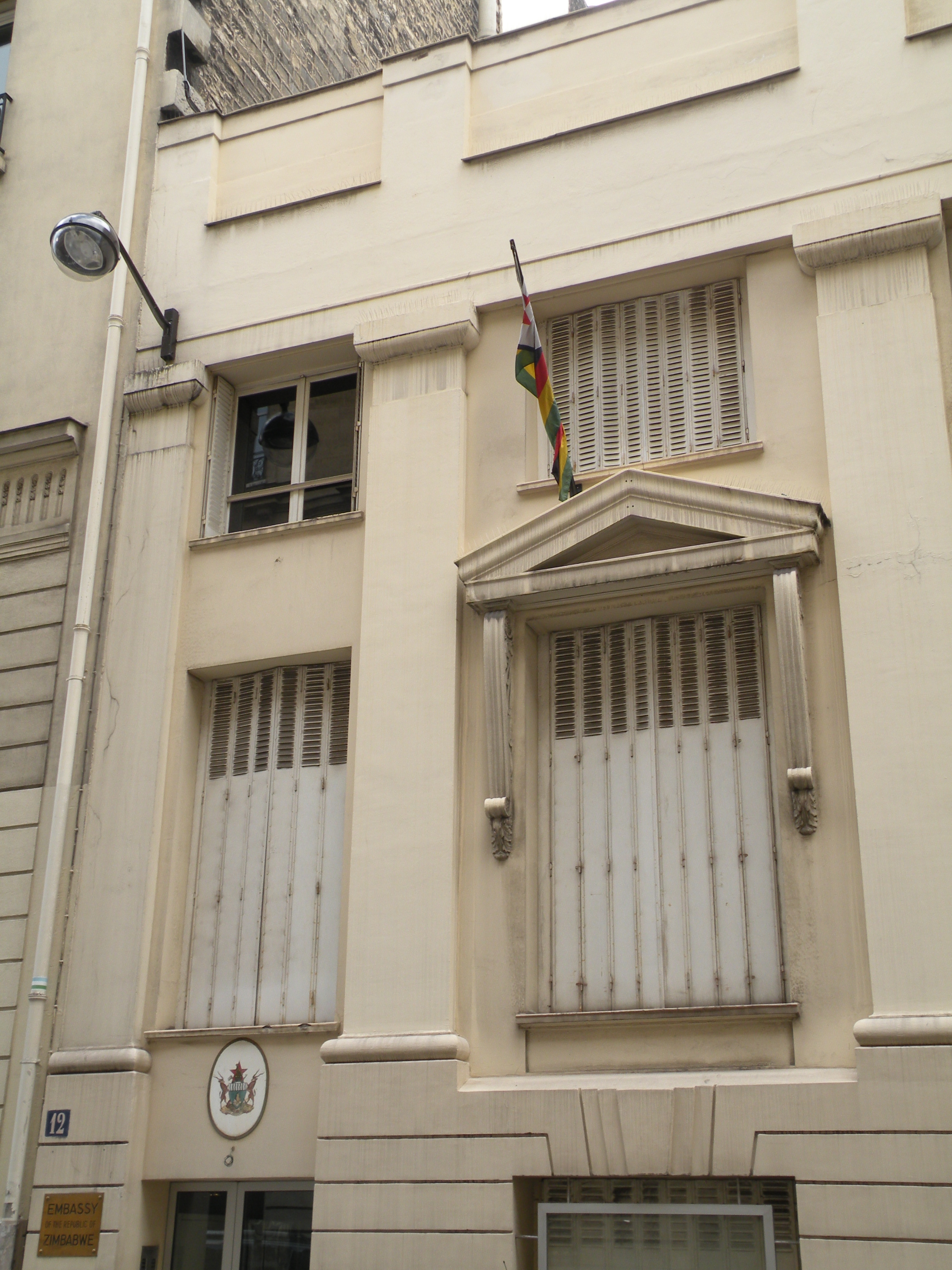
Embassy in Paris

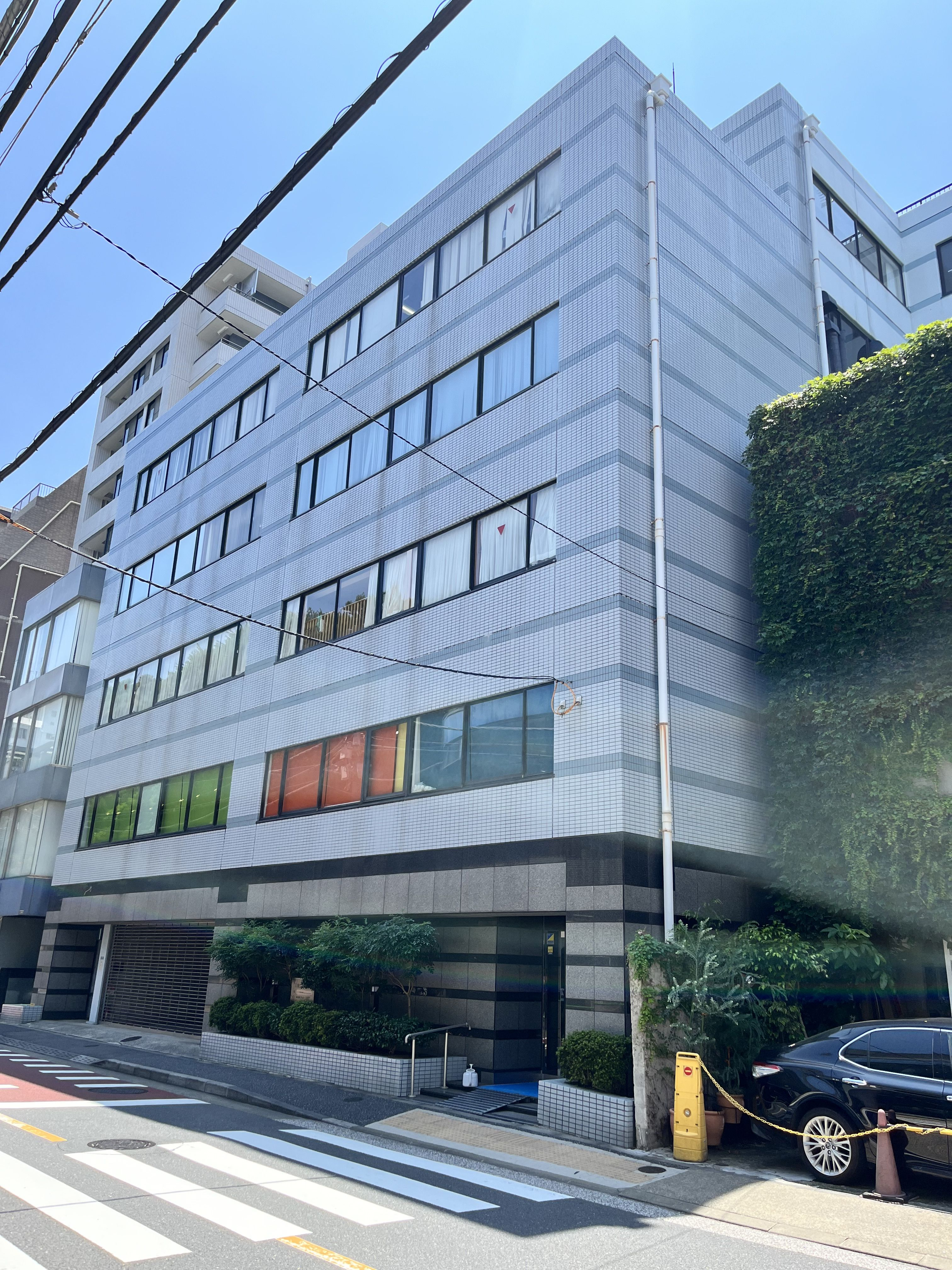
Embassy in Tokyo

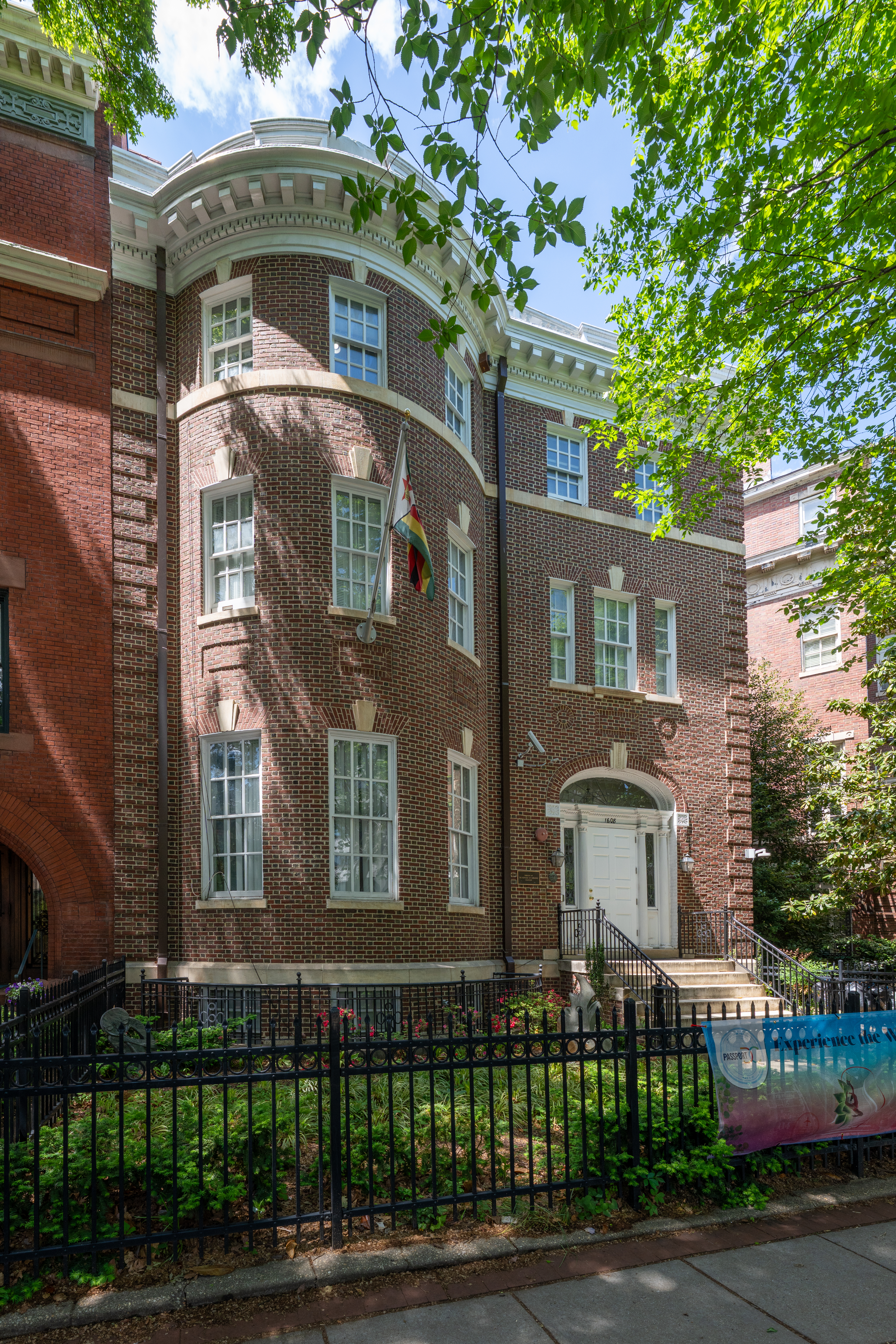
Embassy in Washington, D.C.

== Closed missions ==
=== Asia ===
Host country	Host city	Mission	Year closed	Ref.
Singapore	Singapore	Embassy	Unknown	

=== Europe ===
Host country	Host city	Mission	Year closed	Ref.
Austria	Vienna	Embassy	2015	
Serbia and Montenegro	Belgrade	Embassy (Note: To be reopened.)	2006	

== Mission to open ==
Host country	Host city	Mission	Ref.
Azerbaijan	Baku	Embassy	

== See also ==
- Foreign relations of Zimbabwe
- List of diplomatic missions in Zimbabwe
- Visa policy of Zimbabwe
