= Mashingaidze =

Mashingaidze is a Zimbabwean surname. Notable people with the surname include:

- Alice Mashingaidze, Zimbabwean diplomat
- Elleck Mashingaidze, Zimbabwean diplomat
- Gibson Mashingaidze, Zimbabwean politician
