= Foreign relations of Zimbabwe =

Zimbabwe maintains relations with various countries around the world, and maintains close diplomatic relations with neighboring nations.

== Bilateral relationships ==
Zimbabwe has significant bilateral relations with several countries.

Following Ian Smith's Unilateral Declaration of Independence from the United Kingdom in 1965 Rhodesia's diplomatic presence was dramatically rolled back across the world. By the time of the Lancaster House Agreement in 1979 Rhodesia only had representative offices in London, Bonn, Pretoria, Sydney, Washington, D.C. and Tokyo. Missions in Maputo (then Lourenço Marques) and Lisbon were closed in 1975 following the Carnation Revolution in Portugal. Under Robert Mugabe Zimbabwe ran a new foreign policy which operated more closely with African, Soviet and NAM states.

Some white Rhodesians who have left their country following ZANU-PF coming to power have established "embassies" and offices representing a government in exile in places afar as Thailand, Iceland and London.

The capital of the country, Harare, currently hosts 51 embassies. Several other countries have ambassadors accredited from other capital cities, mainly Pretoria and Addis Ababa. Several countries have closed their embassies in Zimbabwe in recent years to protest the policies of President Robert Mugabe, with the Czech Republic and Botswana being the latest to announce their intentions to do so.

== Diplomatic relations ==
List of countries which Zimbabwe maintains diplomatic relations with:

#	Country	Date
1	United Kingdom	18 April 1980
2	Albania	18 April 1980
3	Australia	18 April 1980
4	Brazil	18 April 1980
5	Bulgaria	18 April 1980
6	China	18 April 1980
7	Denmark	18 April 1980
8	France	18 April 1980
9	Germany	18 April 1980
10	India	18 April 1980
11	Italy	18 April 1980
12	Jamaica	18 April 1980
13	Netherlands	18 April 1980
14	North Korea	18 April 1980
15	Norway	18 April 1980
16	Philippines	18 April 1980
17	Portugal	18 April 1980
18	Romania	18 April 1980
19	Serbia	18 April 1980 (Note: Relations established between SFR Yugoslavia and Zimbabwe)
20	Sweden	18 April 1980
21	United States	18 April 1980
22	Canada	19 April 1980
23	Cuba	20 April 1980
24	Spain	21 April 1980
25	Belgium	24 April 1980
26	Mozambique	30 April 1980
27	Tanzania	30 April 1980
28	Egypt	30 April 1980
29	Zambia	30 April 1980
30	Guinea	30 April 1980
31	Nicaragua	April 1980
32	Japan	5 June 1980
33	Togo	16 June 1980
34	Guyana	19 June 1980
—	Holy See	26 June 1980
35	Libya	June 1980
36	Switzerland	2 July 1980
37	Austria	11 July 1980
38	Ethiopia	August 1980
39	Finland	1 August 1980
40	Greece	13 August 1980
41	Algeria	31 August 1980
42	Ghana	29 October 1980
43	Pakistan	November 1980
44	Hungary	22 December 1980
45	Democratic Republic of the Congo	1980
46	Poland	18 February 1981
47	Russia	18 February 1981
48	Czech Republic	26 March 1981 (Note: Relations established between Czechoslovakia and Zimbabwe)
49	Senegal	1 June 1981
50	Iraq	June 1981
51	Malawi	7 July 1981
52	Vietnam	24 July 1981
53	Bangladesh	28 August 1981
54	Madagascar	19 October 1981
55	Eswatini	27 November 1981
56	Luxembourg	15 December 1981
57	Nigeria	January 1982
58	Tunisia	January 1982
59	Oman	15 June 1982
60	Lesotho	1 July 1982
61	Turkey	2 July 1982
62	Angola	15 October 1982
63	Liberia	15 October 1982
64	Iran	11 February 1983
65	Kenya	5 March 1983
—	Sahrawi Arab Democratic Republic	25 May 1983
66	Botswana	31 May 1983
67	Ireland	October 1983
68	Sri Lanka	1983
69	Mongolia	30 August 1984
70	Nepal	27 November 1984
71	New Zealand	15 February 1985
72	Mexico	12 March 1985
73	Argentina	15 March 1985
74	Thailand	4 April 1985
75	Burundi	26 April 1985
76	Yemen	15 May 1985
77	Suriname	20 December 1985
78	Niger	10 February 1986
79	Cape Verde	12 March 1986
80	Peru	30 April 1986
81	Indonesia	14 August 1986
82	Laos	14 August 1986
83	Vanuatu	15 August 1986
84	Maldives	7 January 1987
85	Seychelles	11 March 1987
86	Afghanistan	31 March 1987
87	Venezuela	7 April 1987
88	Singapore	31 July 1987
89	Malaysia	25 September 1987
90	Papua New Guinea	May 1988
91	Colombia	10 October 1988
—	State of Palestine	1988
92	Cyprus	13 February 1989
93	Somalia	5 December 1989
94	Bahamas	1989
95	Sudan	1989
96	Namibia	21 March 1990
97	Gabon	27 August 1990
98	Kuwait	27 February 1991
99	Cameroon	28 February 1991
100	Kazakhstan	10 April 1992
101	Belarus	16 April 1992
102	Ukraine	25 April 1992
103	Chile	26 May 1992
104	Lithuania	18 June 1992
105	Estonia	29 June 1992
106	Armenia	30 June 1992
107	Georgia	24 July 1992
108	Moldova	9 December 1992
109	Slovakia	3 March 1993
110	Israel	26 November 1993
111	South Africa	29 April 1994
112	Brunei	7 September 1994
113	South Korea	18 November 1994
114	Eritrea	9 June 1995
115	United Arab Emirates	24 June 1996
116	Bahrain	27 June 1996
117	Ivory Coast	16 September 1996
118	Qatar	11 June 1998
119	Croatia	12 February 1999
120	Tonga	February 1999
121	Turkmenistan	22 March 1999
122	Uruguay	9 April 1999
123	Rwanda	7 October 1999
124	Cambodia	30 June 2001
125	Mauritius	6 December 2002
126	Equatorial Guinea	2 June 2004
127	Uganda	31 July 2004
128	Mali	23 March 2006
129	Guatemala	2 March 2007
130	Dominican Republic	15 October 2007
131	Morocco	27 December 2007
132	Uzbekistan	18 January 2008
133	Mauritania	25 July 2008
134	Azerbaijan	24 October 2008
135	Trinidad and Tobago	23 July 2009
136	Myanmar	27 August 2009
137	Montenegro	22 November 2010
138	North Macedonia	13 January 2011
139	Paraguay	29 March 2012
140	Sierra Leone	19 April 2012
141	South Sudan	4 May 2012
142	Bosnia and Herzegovina	11 July 2012
143	Gambia	19 July 2012
144	Republic of the Congo	27 March 2014
145	Latvia	23 January 2015
146	Ecuador	10 February 2015
147	Slovenia	22 July 2016
148	Kyrgyzstan	7 December 2017
149	Tajikistan	28 December 2017
150	Central African Republic	12 April 2018
151	Benin	19 July 2018
152	Burkina Faso	30 October 2019
153	Saudi Arabia	4 December 2020
154	Guinea-Bissau	27 April 2021
155	Bolivia	24 November 2021
156	Saint Kitts and Nevis	30 November 2021
157	Lebanon	29 March 2022
158	São Tomé and Príncipe	15 June 2022
159	Chad	13 February 2023
160	Panama	28 December 2023
161	El Salvador	16 February 2024
162	Jordan	3 March 2024
163	Djibouti	20 January 2025
164	Andorra	20 May 2025
165	Solomon Islands	2 March 2026
166	Saint Lucia	21 September 2026
167	Malta	21 September 2026
—	Sovereign Military Order of Malta	23 September 2026

== Bilateral relations ==
=== Africa ===
Country	Formal relations began	Notes
Angola		See Angola–Zimbabwe relations
Botswana	30 May 1983	See Botswana–Zimbabwe relations Though initially friendly towards Zimbabwe, several disputes between the two countries have soured relations in recent years. Such problems include the fact that Botswana has seen an influx of refugees from Zimbabwe; the building of a fence along the border, and has complained on several occasions of a campaign by Zimbabwe's state-run media against the government of Botswana, where it cites claims of human rights abuses against Zimbabwean's and the claim that Botswana, along with the United Kingdom and other countries were supporting the opposition in Zimbabwe. Recently, relations have further been strained when the government of Botswana lodged a protest against the political violence occurring in Zimbabwe and the detention of opposition members in the country, stating it was "uncalled for". Protesting the outcome of the Zimbabwean presidential election of 2008, and the 'illegitimate' regime in Zimbabwe, President Ian Khama boycotted the Southern African Development Community (SADC) summit on 16–17 August, which was instead attended by the Botswana Foreign Minister. Relations have further deteriorated between Zimbabwe, Botswana and Zambia after the latter two countries withdrew from a Memorandum of Understanding, excluding Zimbabwe and signed a new one to undertake the construction of the Kazungula Bridge Project on a bilateral basis. This was done despite a caution from the New Partnership for Africa's Development (NPAD) to not let politics interfere with the development project. In November 2008, Botswana foreign minister Phandu Skelemani stated that all countries bordering Zimbabwe should close their borders with the country, to 'bring down Robert Mugabe's government'.
Kenya		See Kenya–Zimbabwe relations Following the controversial Zimbabwean presidential election of 2008, Kenyan Prime Minister Raila Odinga urged the African Union to suspend Zimbabwe until "free and fair elections" have taken place. He has also called for the removal of Mugabe.
Libya		See Libya–Zimbabwe relations In the past Zimbabwe has enjoyed a close relationship with the government of Muammar Gaddafi partly due to their shared animosity towards Western governments. During the 2011 Libyan civil war the Mugabe regime indicated that it will not recognise the anti-Gaddafi National Transitional Council. When the staff of the Libyan embassy defected and joined the NTC after the decisive Battle of Tripoli in August 2011 Harare expelled the embassy, giving them 48 hours to leave the country.
Namibia		See Namibia–Zimbabwe relations The ruling parties of Namibia (since independence in 1990) and Zimbabwe (since independence in 1980) have been close since pre-independence days, as both were anti-colonial movements against white-minority governments.
South Africa		See South Africa–Zimbabwe relations: South Africa has an embassy in Harare.; Zimbabwe has an embassy in Pretoria and a consulate general in Johannesburg.; In recent years, following the political crisis in the country, the ex-president Thabo Mbeki mediated with the MDC and Zanu PF to form a unity government, and often remained silent on the issues in Zimbabwe, which drew criticism. Following a cholera outbreak in Zimbabwe, the ruling ANC in South Africa became impatient and has urged the parties to form a unity government.
Zambia	30 April 1980	See Zambia–Zimbabwe relations Both countries established diplomatic relations on 30 April 1980. Initially, the two countries had good relations after gaining independence. However, relations have recently been strained as Zambia, like Botswana, has reported similar 'smear campaigns' against the Zambian government by Zimbabwe's state-owned media, claiming it was "hired by Britain to press for a speedy regime change in Harare." The foreign affairs minister, Kabinga Pande, has said it has lodged a protest against Zimbabwe, against the "sustained malicious campaign against Zambia." Following the controversial Zimbabwean presidential election of 2008, Zambian President Levy Mwanawasa described Mugabe's Zimbabwe as a "regional embarrassment".

=== Americas ===
Country	Formal relations began	Notes
Argentina	15 March 1985	Both countries established diplomatic relations on 15 March 1985. Relations were strained in the 1980s when the government of Robert Mugabe very publicly supported the British position on the Falklands War.
Canada	1980	See Canada–Zimbabwe relations Embassy of Zimbabwe in Ottawa: Canada has an embassy in Harare.; Zimbabwe has an embassy in Ottawa.; Because of Zimbabwe's poor record on human rights and democracy, Canada has imposed sanctions on Zimbabwe which include aid suspension and visa-ban to some members of the Harare government. Bilateral trade totalled C$16 million in 2011, down from C$430 million in 1999. Canadian investment in Zimbabwe is primarily in the mining sector.
Mexico	March 1985	See Mexico–Zimbabwe relations Mexico and Zimbabwe established diplomatic relations in March 1985. Mexico opened an embassy in Harare in 1990, however, the embassy was later closed in 1994.: Mexico is accredited to Zimbabwe from its embassy in Pretoria, South Africa.; Zimbabwe is accredited to Mexico from its embassy in Washington, D.C., United States.
United States	18 April 1980	Embassy of Zimbabwe in Washington See United States–Zimbabwe relations U.S. President Jimmy Carter met with Zimbabwean Prime Minister Robert Mugabe in August 1980. Author Geoff Hill criticized Carter for keeping "quiet as Mugabe nationalized the press, committed genocide against minority tribes and subverted [Zimbabwe's] constitution to make himself the sole source of authority." Zimbabwean Foreign Minister Simbarashe Mumbengegwi summoned U.S. Ambassador to Zimbabwe Christopher Dell on 9 November 2005 and expressed his "extreme displeasure" with comments Dell made a few days earlier in Mutare. Dell had said government corruption had led to food shortages. Mugabe said Dell could "go to hell." Dell left Zimbabwe for Washington, D.C., United States on 9 November for consultations after meeting with Minister Mumbengegwi.: United States has an embassy in Harare.; Zimbabwe has an embassy in Washington, D.C.

=== Asia ===
Country	Formal relations began	Notes
China	19 April 1980	See China–Zimbabwe relations The People's Republic of China supported Robert Mugabe's Zimbabwe African National Union while the Soviet Union supported Joshua Nkomo's Zimbabwe African People's Union, competing militant Marxist organizations that sought an end to Rhodesia and the establishment of a one-party Communist state in its place. The PRC's initial investment in Mugabe has continued. China has invested more in Zimbabwe than any other nation with 35 companies spending over $600 million USD. The close economic relationship between Zimbabwe and China is partly driven by sanctions imposed by Western nations in response to the Zimbabwean government's continued human rights abuses. Li Ke, China's Vice-Minister for Economic Relations, visited Zimbabwe for 13 days in September 1980. Mugabe visited China on 13 October and met with Prime Minister Zhao Ziyang. In June or July 2006, the Zimbabwean government secretly bought Chinese rifles, bullets, anti-riot gear and other military equipment in return for 30 tons of ivory, violating the Convention on International Trade in Endangered Species which forbids the sale of ivory. Interpol and CITES, an ivory-watchdog organization, are investigating the sale. The Zimbabwean government bought six military aircraft from China in 2005 and another six aircraft from three Chinese firms on 23 August 2006. Two days later the Zimbabwe National Army said it bought 127 trucks for $1.2 million. The Chinese government donated farm machinery worth $25 million to Zimbabwe on 21 April, including 424 tractors and 50 trucks, as part of a $58 million loan to the Zimbabwean government. The Mugabe administration previously seized white-owned farms and gave them to blacks, damaging machinery in the process. In return for the equipment and the loan the Zimbabwean government will ship 30 million kilograms of tobacco to the People's Republic of China immediately and as much as 80 million kilograms over the next five years. John Nkomo, Speaker of the House of Assembly of Zimbabwe, praised China's investment on 24 April 2007 during a state dinner in Harare held during the four-day visit of Jia Qinglin, Chairman of the National Committee of the Chinese People's Political Consultative Conference, to Zimbabwe. Misheck Sibanda, the Chief Secretary to the President and Cabinet, Edna Madzongwe, President of the Senate, cabinet ministers, and legislators from both ZANU-PF and the Movement for Democratic Change attended the dinner.: China has an embassy in Harare.
India		See India-Zimbabwe relations
Israel	1993	See Israel–Zimbabwe relations
Pakistan		See Pakistan–Zimbabwe relations
Turkey	2 July 1982	See Turkey–Zimbabwe relations: Zimbabwe has an embassy in Ankara.; Turkey has an embassy in Harare.; Trade volume between the two countries was US$17.7 million in 2019 (Zimbabwe's exports/imports: 11.8/5.9 million USD).

=== Europe ===
Country	Formal relations began	Notes
Denmark		Zimbabwe is represented in Denmark from its embassy in Stockholm, Sweden.; Denmark is represented in Zimbabwe, through its embassy in Lusaka, Zambia.
France	18 April 1980	Upon taking power in 1980, Mugabe was "sharply critical" of French president Valery Giscard d'Estaing, said that he hoped their next president François Mitterrand would be better. In 1986, at a meeting of the Non-Aligned Movement in Harare, Mugabe said "France has been involved in many acts of aggression against African countries... We have seen France supporting regimes which are not democratic, which do not respect human rights... We cannot accept any attempt by France to interfere in our internal affairs." Throughout the 1980s Mugabe was critical of France's role in supporting Hissene Habre, the former dictator of Chad who was accused of human rights abuses. Mugabe also criticized France's nuclear testing program in the South Pacific, which had been ongoing since the 1960s. In 1985, he spoke out against French nuclear testing during a speech at the United Nations General Assembly, calling it a "crime against humanity." Additionally, Mugabe accused France of supporting the apartheid government in South Africa by continuing to trade with them despite international sanctions. He called for a boycott of French goods and services in protest. In the 1990s relations between France and Zimbabwe were very cold due Robert Mugabe's support for Front for the Restoration of Unity and Democracy during the Djiboutian Civil War, which placed Zimbabwe on the opposite side of the conflict than France. Throughout the early 1990s there was somewhat of a diplomatic spat between members of the Zimbabwean government and members of the French government. In one of the rare instances of Mugabe showing solidarity with the United States, he said he felt like the Americans had "sided with (Zimbabwe)" in the "spat with France" during the summer of 1991. Several members of Mugabe's government, including Witness Mangwende, Victoria Chitepo, Stan Mudenge and Nicholas Goche all echoed these sentiments. French President Jacques Chirac angered the governments of the United Kingdom and the United States when in February 2003 he invited President Mugabe to a Franco-African conference on Africa held in France. Mugabe said he felt "at home" in Paris and "President Chirac insisted that we attend. He held firm to his principles. We need leaders of his stature." Chirac later emphasized that he had not kissed Mugabe on his cheeks when the conference began. The UK had previously tried to get the European Union to deny Mugabe the right to come to Europe, citing human rights abuses in Zimbabwe. Zimbabwean opposition leader Morgan Tsvangirai said it was "a slap in the face for the French Government or any government in Europe to be accommodating him." Ministers were said to be "furious" at the prospect of Grace Mugabe, the President's wife, returning to the stricken country with "crates of luxury goods" while Zimbabwe was in the middle of a self-inflicted crisis that resulted in mass starvation. A British minister remarked "The thought of Mugabe gorging himself on French food while his people starve is morally repugnant." The French government paid for Robert and Grace Mugabe to stay at the five-star Plaza Athénée Hotel. About the meeting the U.S. publication the Washington Post wrote: "Who would be irresponsible enough to lend legitimacy to Mugabe, a man whose brutal land-seizure tactics have reduced much of Zimbabwe to starvation? But you have probably guessed the answer: It is that friend of liberty, fraternity and equality -- the president of France.": France has a mission in Harare.; Zimbabwe has an embassy in Paris.
Germany	18 April 1980	See: Germany-Zimbabwe relations German Chancellor Helmut Kohl had notoriously bad relations with the Zimbabwean government throughout the 1980s and most of the 1990s. While this was not due to any personal animosity between Kohl and Mugabe, it was rather due to an "indifference to the region" on the part of Kohl which led to Zimbabwean diplomats consistently viewing the German government as "cold and uncaring." As of 2018, the German government stated they remained "hesitant" to begin "cooperation with Zimbabwe." German Chancellor Angela Merkel controversially stated that "Zimbabwe damages Africa's image.": Germany has an embassy in Harare.; Zimbabwe has an embassy in Berlin.
Greece	13 August 1980	See Greece–Zimbabwe relations Both countries established diplomatic relations on 13 August 1980.: Greece has an embassy in Harare.
Poland	1981	See Poland–Zimbabwe relations: Poland is accredited to Zimbabwe from its embassy in Pretoria, and there is an honorary consulate of Poland in Harare.; Zimbabwe is accredited to Poland from its embassy in Berlin.
Russia	1981-02-18	See Russia–Zimbabwe relations: Russia has a mission in Harare.; Zimbabwe has an embassy in Moscow: Embassy of Zimbabwe, Moscow.; Russia-Zimbabwe relations date back to January 1979, during the Rhodesian Bush War. The Soviet Union supported Joshua Nkomo's Zimbabwe African People's Union, and supplied them with arms; Robert Mugabe's attempts to gain Soviet support for his Zimbabwe African National Union were rebuffed, leading him to enter into relations with Soviet rival Beijing. Throughout the 1980s Zimbabwean relations with the USSR were notoriously cold. Mugabe "stonewalled" the Soviets "for ten months" rather than establish relations with them while he was establishing relations with other countries including the United Kingdom and the United States. The agreement the Soviets were forced to agree to demanded they meet strict criteria about how they could operate in Zimbabwe, while no other country had to agree to similar concessions before establishing relations. The agreement was described as "embarrassing and humiliating for the Soviets since it singles them out." Mugabe shunned Russian help and allowed British military bases to be established in Zimbabwe against Russian protests, while also accepting the help of British military advisers and declining the same offers from the Soviet Union. Several American-made movies were aired in Zimbabwean movie theaters in the 1980s that the Soviets believed constituted "anti-Soviet propaganda," including the movies Invasion U.S.A., Red Dawn, Firefox, Rocky IV, Rambo: First Blood Part II, Water, The Living Daylights, The Whistle Blower, and Rambo III. The Soviet embassy officially protested, however, they were allegedly told by Mugabe "to complain to your ZIPRA friends." During a speech in Pakistan, Mugabe outspokenly opposed the Soviet invasion of Afghanistan and compared the Soviet occupation of Afghanistan with apartheid in South Africa, Jay Ross of the Washington Post referred to this as "about as harsh a criticism of Moscow as an African leader could make." Mugabe condemned the Soviet invasion of Afghanistan throughout the 1980s. However, since the 2000s Robert Mugabe had strengthened his relations with both Beijing and Moscow as a result of intense western pressure on him. Zimbabwe was one of the few countries that voted with Russia on United Nations General Assembly Resolution 68/262 about the annexation of Crimea. Russia maintains strong economic and political ties with Zimbabwe.
Serbia	18 April 1980	See Serbia–Zimbabwe relations Relations between Serbia and Zimbabwe trace back to the Cold War period, when SFR Yugoslavia and newly independent Zimbabwe were both members of the Non-Aligned Movement. After the breakup of Yugoslavia, Serbia remained the only among successor state to maintain an Embassy in Zimbabwe (1980-2001) which reopened in 2022. In the post–Cold War era, the two countries continued their relationship, in part due to their shared experience of international isolation. Zimbabwe supports Serbian position on the issue of 2008 Kosovo declaration of independence.: Serbia has an embassy in Harare.
United Kingdom	18 April 1980	See United Kingdom–Zimbabwe relations British Foreign Secretary Boris Johnson with Zimbabwean Foreign Minister Sibusiso Moyo at a Commonwealth summit in London, April 2018. Zimbabwe established diplomatic relations with the United Kingdom on 18 April 1980.: Zimbabwe maintains an embassy in London.; The United Kingdom is accredited to Zimbabwe through its embassy in Harare.; The UK governed Zimbabwe from 1923 to 1980, when Zimbabwe achieved full independence. Both countries share common membership of the United Nations, and the World Trade Organization, as well as the Eastern and Southern Africa–UK Economic Partnership Agreement. Bilaterally the two countries have a Development Partnership, a Double Taxation Agreement, and have signed an Investment Agreement. Embassy of Zimbabwe in London Historically, relations between Zimbabwe and the United Kingdom were close. British Prime Minister Margaret Thatcher was instrumental in the transition to majority rule and independence, and throughout the 1980s she proved to be a close friend of Zimbabwe. Robert Mugabe very publicly sided with Britain and Margaret Thatcher on the issue of the Falklands War. In the early 1990s John Major had a friendly working relationship with Robert Mugabe and both visited Zimbabwe and also invited Robert Mugabe to the United Kingdom. Throughout the 1980s Mugabe shunned help from the Soviet Union and allowed British military bases to be established in Zimbabwe against Russian protests, while also accepting the help of British military advisers and declining the same offers from the Soviet Union. He allowed Britain to maintain military bases in the country. Throughout the 1980s Mugabe described himself as "an Anglophile" and was frequently seen to wear British-made Savile Row suits. Mugabe also heavily promoted cricket in Zimbabwe, saying "Cricket civilizes people and creates good gentlemen," he declared. "I want everyone to play cricket in Zimbabwe. I want ours to be a nation of gentlemen." After independence Zimbabwe remained a member of the Commonwealth of Nations. Mugabe also formed a "genuine friendship" and political alliance with British Prime Minister Margaret Thatcher. When members of Mugabe's cabinet celebrated Margaret Thatcher's removal from office in 1990, Mugabe rebuked them, reportedly saying: "Who organised our independence? Let me tell you – if it hadn't been for Mrs Thatcher none of you would be here today. I'm sorry she's gone." In 1991 Zimbabwe hosted the 1991 Commonwealth Heads of Government Meeting where the commonwealth issued the Harare Declaration. Diana, Princess of Wales visited Mr Mugabe in Harare in 1993. Mugabe was knighted by Queen Elizabeth II in 1994. The England cricket team played Zimbabwe in Harare in 1996 in a match attended by Mugabe. However, between 1998 and 2017, relations between Zimbabwe and the UK had been typically cold; with President Robert Mugabe frequently accusing the former colonial power of sabotage; ruining the country and attempting to invade the country. In turn, UK Prime Minister Gordon Brown refused to attend an African/European summit while Mugabe was invited, citing Zimbabwe's poor human rights record. The UK also did not attend an address by Mugabe at the 2008 UN Food Summit, stating that his presence there was "obscene". However, Mugabe was later forcibly removed from power in November 2017 and soon afterwards, Britain's Minister to Africa Rory Stewart became the first British Minister to visit Zimbabwe in two decades. In January 2019, Conservative Secretary and defence spokesman Geoffrey Van Orden MEP said that the EU should review its sanctions against Zimbabwe following the brutal crackdown on opposition forces. When Queen Elizabeth II died Zimbabwe's government, including President Emmerson Mnangagwa, publicly expressed solidarity with the British public. President Emerson Mnangagwa signed the book of condolences at the British Embassy and issued a statement saying "it was an honour to sign the condolence book for the late Queen Elizabeth II." Livit Mugejo, the spokesman for foreign affairs of the Zimbabwean government read a statement saying that the Zimbabwean government "take this opportunity to express heartfelt condolences to the family of Her Majesty the Queen and the people of the United Kingdom. Her death is a loss not only to her family, and the British people, but also to the entire world." President Mnangagwa was invited to Queen Elizabeth's funeral, at the funeral Zimbabwe was represented by Foreign Affairs Minister Frederick Shava. The British government's HALO Trust and the British army work extensively in demining operations in Zimbabwe through cooperation with the Zimbabwean government. As of early 2023, British efforts to assist in demining in northeast Zimbabwe are on track to lead to an entirely mine-free Zimbabwe by 2025.

=== Oceania ===
Country	Formal relations began	Notes
Australia	18 April 1980	See Australia–Zimbabwe relations In 2002, the Howard government in Australia imposed targeted sanctions against members of the Zimbabwean government in protest against the deteriorating political situation in Zimbabwe. The sanctions were extended and strengthened in 2007. These sanctions have included restrictions on travel to and through Australia for certain members of the Zimbabwean government, suspension of all non-humanitarian aid, and prohibitions on defence links. The Rudd government in 2008 considered further sanctions against Zimbabwe, with foreign minister Stephen Smith declaring that "I've made it clear that we are open to consider more sanctions ... We are currently giving active consideration to that issue.": Australia has an embassy in Harare.; Zimbabwe has an embassy in Canberra.

== Zimbabwe and the Commonwealth of Nations ==
Zimbabwe became an independent republic in the Commonwealth of Nations on 18 April 1980. Zimbabwe withdrew from the Commonwealth of Nations in December 2003, due to international criticism of the Government of Zimbabwe's human rights record.

Emmerson Mnangagwa, Robert Mugabe's successor as President of Zimbabwe, has stated that Zimbabwe will apply to return to the Commonwealth in late 2018, following in the footsteps of The Gambia returning to the Commonwealth on 8 February 2018.

Sibusiso Moyo attended the Commonwealth Heads of Government Meeting 2018 in his capacity as Minister of Foreign Affairs.

The British Government has expressed support for Zimbabwe to return to its membership of the Commonwealth.

== See also ==
- List of diplomatic missions in Zimbabwe
- List of diplomatic missions of Zimbabwe
- Zimbabwe and the Non-Aligned Movement
