= Netherlands–Zimbabwe relations =

- Netherlands: Zimbabwe

Netherlands–Zimbabwe relations are the bilateral relations between the Netherlands and Zimbabwe. Diplomatic ties were established on April 18, 1980.

== History ==
The Netherlands seeks to deepen its diplomatic relationship with Zimbabwe. The two nations are working together on responsibilities of participating institutions, land priorities, and a Bilateral Investment Promotion and Protection Agreement. The Netherlands describes one hurdle in relations with Zimbabwe being compensation for expropriated Dutch farmers. The Netherlands accused Zimbabwe of expropriating 80 Dutch owned farms during Zimbabwe's land reform program. The Netherlands is a big gateway connecting Zimbabwe to Europe.

With the Netherlands cutting foreign spending, certain programs in Zimbabwe will be terminated such as groups for gender equality, education, and sports. The Netherlands still provides aid to human rights defenders, promoting gender equality, climate change, and economic development.

== Aid in Zimbabwe ==
The Dutch Relief Alliance provides assistance and aid to people in Zimbabwe facing food insecurity affected by droughts.

The Dutch government gave $1.5 million to the International Organization for Migration to support humanitarian activities.

== Trade ==
Both countries have maintained agricultural trade since the 1980s.

The Netherlands is the destination for 70% of Zimbabwe's fresh produce exports. These exports include flowers, peas and berries.

In 2024, the Netherlands exported $35.8M worth of goods to Zimbabwe, their top export being bedspreads which totaled at $4.96M. In the same year, Zimbabwe exported $106M worth of goods to the Netherlands, their top export being ferroalloys which totaled at $73.9M.

== Diplomatic missions ==
- The Netherlands has an embassy in Harare.
- Zimbabwe is accredited to the Netherlands through its embassy in Brussels.

== See also ==
- Foreign relations of the Netherlands
- Foreign relations of Zimbabwe
