= List of ambassadors of Mexico to Zimbabwe =

Ambassador of Mexico to Zimbabwe
- Inaugural holder: Eduardo Giles Martínez
- Formation: June 1, 1990
- Abolished: January 31, 1994

The Mexican ambassador in Harare was the official representative of the Government in Mexico City to the Government of Zimbabwe.

== List of representatives ==
Diplomatic agrément	Diplomatic accreditation	Ambassador	Observations	List of heads of state of Mexico	List of presidents of Zimbabwe	Term end
June 1, 1990		Eduardo Giles Martínez	Chargé d'affaires	Carlos Salinas de Gortari	Robert Mugabe	October 23, 1990
August 15, 1990	December 10, 1990	Víctor Manuel Solano Montaño		Carlos Salinas de Gortari	Robert Mugabe	January 31, 1994

== See also ==
- Mexico–Zimbabwe relations
