= United Kingdom–Zimbabwe relations =

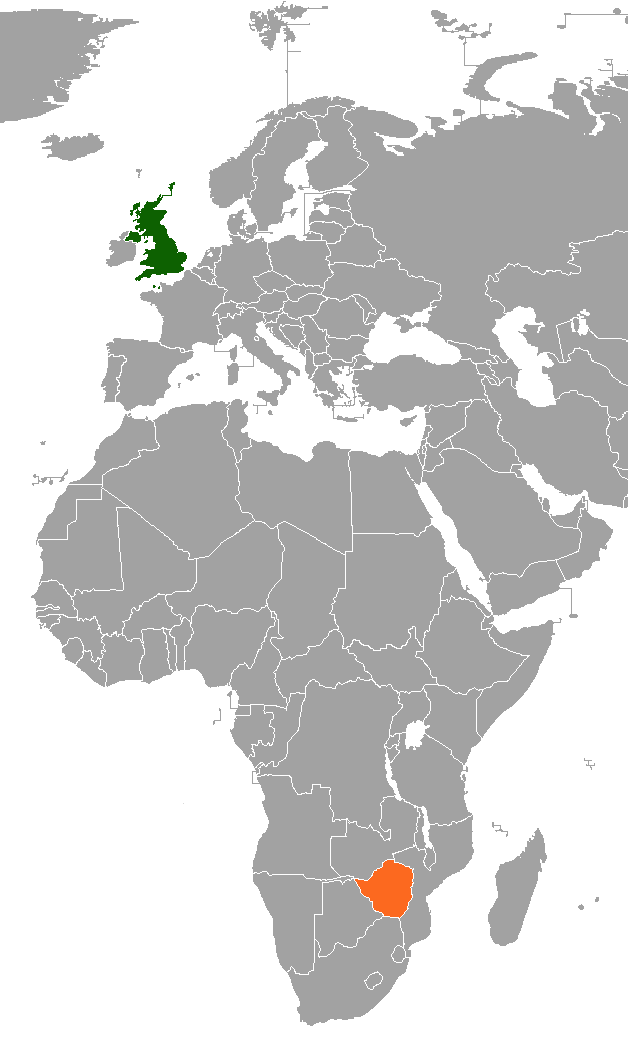

- United Kingdom: Zimbabwe

Relations between the UK and Zimbabwe have been complex since the latter's independence in 1980. The territory of modern Zimbabwe had been colonised by the British South Africa Company in 1890, with the Pioneer Column raising the Union Jack over Fort Salisbury (modern-day Harare) and formally establishing company, and by extension, British, rule over the territory. In 1920 Rhodesia, as the land had been called by the company in honour of their founder, Cecil Rhodes, was brought under jurisdiction of the Crown as the colony of Southern Rhodesia. Southern Rhodesia over the decades following its establishment would slowly be populated by large numbers of Europeans emigrants who came to form a considerable diaspora, largely consisting of Britons but also smaller groups of Italians, Greeks and Afrikaners. A settler culture that had already existed since the time of company would come to cement fully and the white population began to identify as Rhodesians, often in conjunction with British/Afrikaner/Southern European identities of their ancestors. Southern Rhodesia would go on to participate heavily in both the First and Second wars, providing soldiers and military equipment to the British war effort.

During the years after the war, the relationship between Britain and Southern Rhodesia became increasingly strained. The UK had opted to decolonise Africa and had adopted a firm policy of no independence before majority rule, which deeply upset the white establishment of the colony, in particular the radical Rhodesian Front party led by Winston Field and later, Ian Smith. Relations between the British Government and the colonial Southern Rhodesian government deteriorated for much of the early 1960s and negotiations between the two dragged on with little to no success. Eventually, relations broke down entirely and Southern Rhodesia unilaterally declared independence from Britain. The move was met with zero recognition (bar Apartheid South Africa and Portugal, both of whom never formally recognised Rhodesia as a sovereign state and only tacitly cooperated with them) from the international community and the UK government and the illegitimate state was still formally considered under British sovereignty for its roughly 15-year span of existence. For the first 5 years of its proclaimed independence, Rhodesia still declared loyalty to Queen Elizabeth II as Queen of Rhodesia, but this was never recognised by the British monarch who continued to encourage Smith's illegal government to resign. Given her refusal to appoint a Governor-general, from 1965 to 1970, an "Officer Administering the Government", Clifford Dupont served as the de facto head of state instead of the legal Governor of Rhodesia, Sir Humphrey Gibbs. Rhodesia eventually moved to sever all links with Britain and became a self-declared republic with an internationally unrecognised president in 1970.

Throughout the subsequent Rhodesian Bush War between white Rhodesians and black paramilitaries such as ZANU and ZAPU, the UK continued to remain staunchly opposed to the rogue state and extensively sanctioned it, even enforcing blockades using the Royal Navy to cut off Rhodesian oil imports via Portuguese Mozambique. When Rhodesia failed to hold out after 15 years of fighting and came to the negotiating table with the black resistance groups and moderate African nationalist parties, the UK again became directly involved in Rhodesia's affairs. After a brief stint as the nation of Zimbabwe Rhodesia following an Internal Settlement that was denounced by the international community for not being satisfactory enough, the nation transiently reverted to its status as a self-governing British colony before being granted full independence and majority rule as Zimbabwe in 1980 under the landmark Lancaster House Agreement.

Relations between the UK and Zimbabwe in the two decades directly following independence were close and friendly, as a large amount of the British descended white settlers remained in the country (though there was some exodus, but not overly significant) and continued to serve in important positions in politics, business, media, law and most notably agriculture. The UK and Zimbabwe cooperated on many levels and the relationship between Mugabe and Thatcher was reportedly close. This strong period of relations lasted for roughly 20 years until Tony Blair withdrew British funding for land reform in the country, a policy Blair disagreed with. This, coupled with British government's strong condemnation of various human rights abuses committed by Mugabe against opposition groups led to a severe collapse in relations between the two nations. Mugabe proceeded to engage in a mass eviction of white landowners from their farms, which directly led to the collapse of Zimbabwean economy, national food supply and agricultural exports. Following this was a mass exodus of middle to high class White Zimbabweans from the country, with many having been highly educated and working in fields such as the law and education. Many of them fled to the UK due to their British culture and ancestral connections. After a coup d'état against Mugabe due to widespread economic failure and oppression, Emmerson Mnangagwa was elected as the President of Zimbabwe and made significant overtures to the whites that had left the country during Mugabe's presidency. He promised all seized land would be restored and significant financial compensation given for the loss of land, Mnangagwa also offered to pay a fee for anyone willing to return and farm in the country in an effort to bring back Zimbabwe's functioning food production. In light of this, relations between the UK and Zimbabwe have been slowly improving under Mnangagwa, and the country applied to rejoin the Commonwealth in 2018 after its 2003 withdrawal. Tensions still remain however over human rights and particularly the Zimbabwean Army's role in suppressing internal dissent.

== Rhodesia–United Kingdom relations ==
Rhodesia–United Kingdom relations
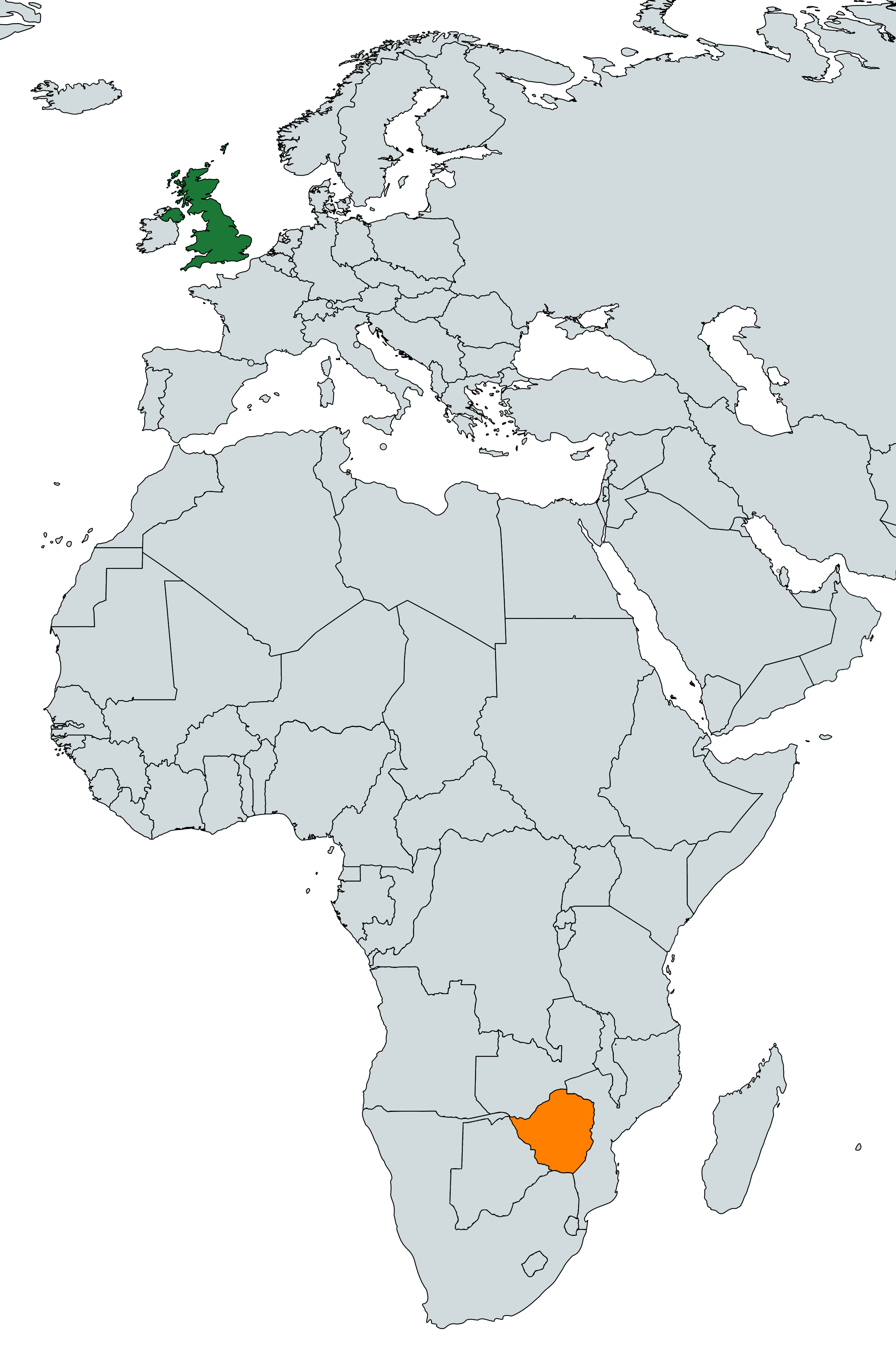

- United Kingdom: Rhodesia

As part of the Scramble for Africa, what is now Zimbabwe was colonised by the British Empire. The area was named Rhodesia after the British mining magnate Cecil Rhodes. The area was under the control of the British South Africa Company.

In 1923, company rule in Rhodesia ended and what is now Zimbabwe became the Colony of Southern Rhodesia.

After a decade and a half of the Rhodesian Bush War, the Lancaster House Agreement agreed that Zimbabwe would become an independent country as from 18 April 1980, when Zimbabwe became a republic in the Commonwealth of Nations

== Zimbabwe ==
=== 1980 to 1997 ===
On 18 April 1980, Zimbabwe was formally granted independence from the United Kingdom. Robert Mugabe became the first Prime Minister of Zimbabwe. Mugabe kept several British advisors around him during the early part of his rule, including Lord Soames who he formed a friendship with. Throughout the 1980s Mugabe surprised many by maintaining a close relationship with the United Kingdom while scorning the Soviet Union. He allowed Britain to maintain military bases in the country. Throughout the 1980s, Mugabe described himself as "an Anglophile" and was frequently seen to wear British-made Savile Row suits. Mugabe also heavily promoted cricket in Zimbabwe, saying "Cricket civilizes people and creates good gentlemen," he declared. "I want everyone to play cricket in Zimbabwe. I want ours to be a nation of gentlemen." After independence Zimbabwe became a member of the Commonwealth of Nations. Mugabe also formed a "genuine friendship" and political alliance with British Prime Minister Margaret Thatcher. In 1986, Mugabe and Thatcher got into a heated argument about sanctions on South Africa, when Thatcher refused to budge Mugabe described her as "racist" to the press. However, shortly thereafter the two leaders resumed their close partnership. When white South African mercenaries were sent by the government of Apartheid South Africa to sabotage equipment in Zimbabwe and effect a breakout of prisoners at a Zimbabwean prison, Thatcher shared crucial intelligence with Mugabe which allowed the Zimbabwean authorities to apprehend the offenders and thwart their efforts. later in 1988, Mugabe was hosted by Thatcher at Chequers, where the two had talks described as "almost gossipy" in what was called an “excellent atmosphere"; both leaders were actively determined to repair relations from that point forward. Thatcher visited Zimbabwe in 1989 and was given a tour of rural communes. The communes had formerly been farms owned by white Zimbabweans, but which had been purchased from those farmers, by the Zimbabwean government with money provided for this purpose by the British government. About these communities Thatcher commented "The land settlement scheme we saw this morning seemed to us extremely good in every way, not only for the variety of agriculture and the kind of village and rural life they were having, but also the education they were giving in the schools and the health service which they received." Writing for theguardian about that visit, Richard Dowden (director of the Royal African Society) said "she visited Mugabe in Zimbabwe, where British troops were training Mozambicans to fight off the South African-backed Renamo movement. A mock attack was organised and she sat between Mugabe and Joachim Chissano to observe. The "bushes" right in front of them suddenly sprang to life and started shooting. The noise was deafening and nobody had warned the watchers that tracer bullets fired away somehow look as if they are coming towards you. I saw Mugabe and Chissano duck and some of the officials flung themselves down. Thatcher didn't blink." On another occasion, "a call came through to Downing Street on a Sunday afternoon from a public phone. It was Mugabe. He had come to London privately with his then wife, Sally, who needed regular dialysis for diabetes. He asked if he could come to visit Thatcher. She agreed and on a Sunday evening at Downing Street the two sat and talked informally about the world and life like old friends – she sipping whisky and he water. It was not the only time that happened." When members of Mugabe's cabinet celebrated Margaret Thatcher's removal from office in 1990, Mugabe rebuked them, reportedly saying: "Who organised our independence? Let me tell you – if it hadn't been for Mrs Thatcher none of you would be here today. I'm sorry she's gone." Recently declassified files show that throughout the 1980s Mugabe would visit Thatcher every single time he was in London, which was eleven times in ten years.

In 1991, Zimbabwe hosted the 1991 Commonwealth Heads of Government Meeting where the Commonwealth issued the Harare Declaration. Diana, Princess of Wales visited Mr Mugabe in Harare in 1993. Mugabe was knighted by Queen Elizabeth II in 1994 with an honorary knighthood (later revoked). The England cricket team played Zimbabwe in Harare in 1996 in a match attended by Mugabe.

=== 1997 to 2017 ===
In 1997, the new British government led by Tony Blair withdrew British funding for land reform in Zimbabwe. The previous prime ministers of Margaret Thatcher and John Major had both supported helping Zimbabwe financially to redress colonial era imbalances in landownership, however the government of Tony Blair disagreed with this approach and withdrew the funding. Then, after the 2000 Zimbabwean parliamentary election was marred with extreme amounts of state sanctioned violence and political oppression, the government of Tony Blair openly criticized human rights abuses being committed by Mugabe's government. After this Mugabe engaged in his controversial land-reform program, in which the predominantly white farm owners were forced off their lands along with their workers, who were typically of regional descent. This was often done violently and without compensation. In this first wave of farm invasions, a total of 110,000 square kilometres of land had been seized. Several million black farm workers were excluded from the redistribution, leaving them without employment. According to Human Rights Watch, by 2002 the War Veterans Association had "killed white farm owners in the course of occupying commercial farms" on at least seven occasions, in addition to "several tens of [black] farm workers". This increased criticism from Tony Blair's government. In response Mugabe said "Blair, keep your England and let me keep my Zimbabwe!" at a summit in Johannesburg. Mugabe also told a crowd at his 90th birthday "The British, we don't hate you, we only love our country better." However, at the Commonwealth Heads of Government Meeting 2002, Zimbabwe was formally suspended from the Commonwealth. Later in 2003, Zimbabwe formally withdrew from the Commonwealth.

On 18 February 2002, the European Union announced a travel ban on Robert Mugabe, which prohibited him from entering the United Kingdom .

Extreme state-sanctioned violence during the 2008 Zimbabwean general election only added to the gap between the British government and the government of Robert Mugabe. British Prime Minister Gordon Brown said the violence was "a new low" for Zimbabwe.

=== Mnangagwa Era ===
Zimbabwe's new president Emmerson Mnangagwa began a process of attempting to reconcile with the UK. He welcomed politicians and business leaders from the UK to engage with Zimbabwe saying "Our quarrel with Britain is over" and that "we have opened our doors to old and new friends." Mnangagwa visited Britain in November 2021 where he met face to face with British Prime Minister Boris Johnson. President Mnangagwa wrote on Twitter that evening that:"Thank you to PM @BorisJohnson and @antonioguterres for welcoming me to #COP26. As the first President of Zimbabwe to visit the United Kingdom in a quarter of a century, it is clear that re-engagement is working!" Prime Minister Johnson wrote on Twitter that evening that it was "Great meeting with ministers from across #ourCommonwealth this morning for talks with Minister Sibusiso Moyo on how Britain, the Commonwealth & the wider international community will do everything it can in supporting Zimbabwe on its path of reform." The first British minister to visit Zimbabwe since the early 2000s was Rory Stewart who was "warmly welcomed" by the government of President Mnangagwa when he visited the country in late 2017.

== Economic relations ==
From 14 May 2012 until 30 December 2020, trade between the United Kingdom and Zimbabwe was governed by the Central America–European Union Association Agreement, while the United Kingdom was a member of the European Union.

Following the withdrawal of the United Kingdom from the European Union, the UK and Zimbabwe signed the Eastern and Southern Africa–UK Economic Partnership Agreement on 31 January 2019. The Eastern and Southern Africa–UK Economic Partnership Agreement is a continuity trade agreement, based on the EU free trade agreement, which entered into force on 1 January 2021. Trade value between 'Eastern and Southern Africa' states and the United Kingdom was worth £1,922 million in 2022.

== See also ==
- Foreign relations of the United Kingdom
- Foreign relations of Zimbabwe
- Zimbabwe and the Commonwealth of Nations
