= South Africa–Zimbabwe relations =

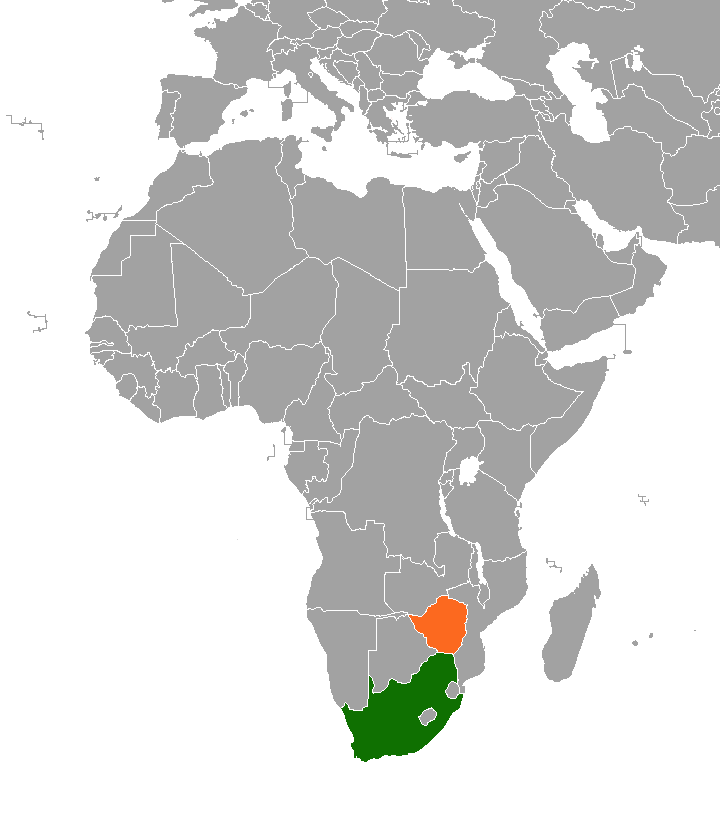

- South Africa: Zimbabwe

South Africa–Zimbabwe relations have been generally cordial since the end of apartheid in South Africa, although there have been tensions due to political troubles in Zimbabwe in recent years.

South Africa has a mission in Harare. Zimbabwe has an embassy in Pretoria and a consulate general in Johannesburg.

The Government of Zimbabwe took a particular interest in the search for independence for Namibia (South-West Africa) from South Africa. In addition, as chairman of the Frontline States in southern Africa, Zimbabwe spoke out vigorously against the policies of apartheid in South Africa and frequently called for the imposition of economic sanctions against the government. However, whilst supporting democratic change in South Africa, Zimbabwean leader Robert Mugabe did not support the idea of Zimbabwe being used as a base for anti-South African guerillas.

In the 2007 Zimbabwean political crisis, South African President Thabo Mbeki mediated with the MDC and ZANU–PF to form a unity government, and often remained silent on the issues in Zimbabwe, which drew criticism. Following a cholera outbreak in Zimbabwe, the ruling ANC in South Africa became impatient and urged the parties to form a unity government.

== Second Congo War ==
On September 3, 1998, South African President Nelson Mandela supported the intervention by Zimbabwean troops in the Democratic Republic of the Congo to support the government of Laurent Kabila against rebels.

== Mbeki presidency (1999–2008) ==
=== 2002 Zimbabwean presidential election ===
Following the disputed Zimbabwean presidential election of 2002, in which Mugabe was re-elected, the South African observer mission was among a minority of international delegations which concluded that the result should be viewed as "legitimate." However, in addition to the observer mission, Mbeki had sent South African judges Sisi Khampepe and Dikgang Moseneke to observe the 2002 election. Their report, commonly known as the Khampepe Report, was not released until 2014, when the Mail & Guardian successfully sued for its publication. Directly contradicting the conclusions of the observer mission, the report documented widespread political intimidation and other anti-democratic behaviours by ZANU-PF, and found that the election "cannot be considered free and fair."

=== 2005 Zimbabwean parliamentary elections ===
In the run-up to the Zimbabwean parliamentary elections of 2005, and despite reports of voter repression and political violence, Mbeki said, "I have no reason to think that anybody in Zimbabwe will act in a way that will militate against elections being free and fair." In addition to the SADC observer mission, the elections were attended by several South African observers, including an official government mission – led by Labour Minister Membathisi Mdladlana – and parliamentary mission. In contrast to many other international observers, none of the official delegations raised major concerns about the freeness or fairness of the elections. Indeed, the SADC mission, led by South African Minerals and Energy Minister Phumzile Mlambo-Ngcuka, congratulated Zimbabwe on what it said had been "peaceful, credible, well managed and transparent" elections and on the "high levels of political tolerance and maturity displayed." However, two South African opposition parties, the Democratic Alliance and Independent Democrats, pulled out of the parliamentary mission and made their own dissenting statements. In response to the government mission's endorsement of the results of the elections, Tsvangirai's party, the Movement for Democratic Change (MDC), apparently effectively severed relations with Mbeki's administration.

== See also ==
- Foreign relations of South Africa
- Foreign relations of Zimbabwe
