= Amos Midzi =

Zimbabwean politician

The Honourable Ambassador Amos Midzi MP

Minister of Mines and Mining Development of Zimbabwe
- In office February 2004 – January 2009
- President: Robert Mugabe
- Preceded by: Edward Chindori-Chininga
- Succeeded by: Obert Mpofu

Personal details
- Born: 4 July 1952 Rhodesia and Nyasaland (now Zambia)
- Died: 9 June 2015 (aged 62) Marirangwe, Zimbabwe
- Party: Zimbabwe African National Union-Patriotic Front

Amos Bernard Muvengwa Midzi (4 July 1952 – 9 June 2015) was a Zimbabwean politician who served in the Cabinet successively as Minister of Energy and Power Development and Minister of Mines and Mining Development from 2002 to 2009.

== Political career ==
He served as Zimbabwe Ambassador to Cuba from 1987 to 1993. Later, Midzi was appointed as Ambassador to the United States in 1993, which he served until 1997, before he was a member of the ZANU-PF politburo. He ran as the ZANU-PF candidate for Mayor of Harare, the capital, in March 2002, but was defeated by Elias Mudzuri of the Movement for Democratic Change (MDC). Midzi received 56,796 votes against 262,275 votes for Mudzuri. On 25 August 2002 he was appointed as Minister of Energy and Power Development; subsequently he was appointed as Minister of Mines and Mining Development on 9 February 2004. He has also served as ZANU-PF Chairman for Harare. He was placed on the United States sanctions list in 2003 and remained there until his death.

Midzi was nominated as ZANU-PF's candidate for the House of Assembly seat from Epworth, a suburb of Harare, in the March 2008 parliamentary election. He was defeated by the MDC's Jembere Elias, receiving 4,758 votes against 6,220 votes for Elias.

The Herald reported on 3 January 2009 that Midzi had been dismissed from the Cabinet earlier in the week, along with 11 other ministers, because he no longer held any seat in Parliament.

Reports of Midzi's death on 9 June 2015 were immediately labelled as suicide.

On 9 June 2015, following Midzi's death, it was also reported that foul play was suspected amid reports that his car keys were missing. Later in June 2015, a post-mortem conducted on his body revealed that he had been poisoned and was buried at Glen Forest Memorial Park.
