= Edmund Chipamaunga =

Zimbabwean writer and diplomat (1938–2019)

Edmund Zivanai Chipamaunga (1938–2019) was a Zimbabwean writer and diplomat. He was the first Zimbabwean ambassador to the United States between 1982 and 1985. He was then transferred to Kenya where he served until 1992. After Zimbabwe's independence in 1980, Chipamaunga was one of the writers who started exploring the experiences of black freedom fighters in the country's liberation struggle.

== Life ==
Chipamaunga was born in Chivhu in what was then Rhodesia. He was educated at Daramombe Primary, St Mary's Secondary and St. Augustine's High School before proceeding to the University of Rhodesia, where he was published in the student magazine Opus. He was headmaster of several schools in Zimbabwe.

Chipamaunga's first novel, A Fighter for Freedom (1983), explored the causes of the Zimbabwean liberation war. His second novel, Chains of Freedom (1997), explored themes of political corruption in the post-independence nation.

== Works ==
- Chipamaunga, Edmund (1983). A Fighter for Freedom. Mambo Press. ISBN 978-0-86922-203-4.
- —— (1998). Chains of Freedom. Zimbabwe Publishing House. ISBN 978-1-77901-150-3.
- —— (2000). Feeding Freedom. Mercury Press. ISBN 978-1-77911-004-6.
- —— (2018). New Roots. Progressive Publishers. ISBN 978-0-7974-9609-5.
