= Embassy of Zimbabwe, Washington, D.C. =

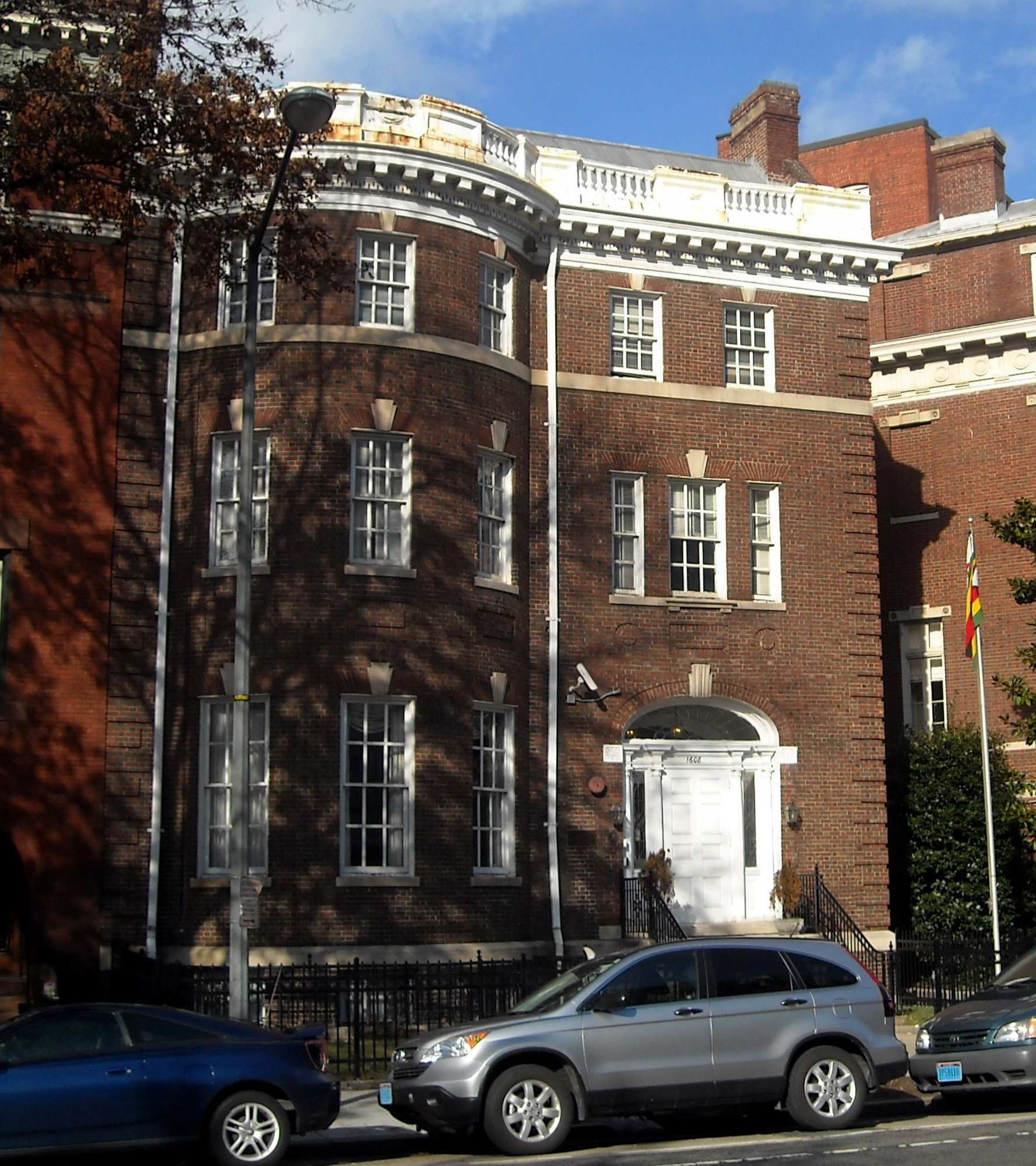
- Location: Washington, D.C.
- Address: 1608 New Hampshire Avenue, N.W.
- Coordinates: 38°54′40.81″N 77°2′30.75″W
- Ambassador: Tadeous T. Chifamba

The Embassy of Zimbabwe in Washington, D.C. is the Zimbabwe's diplomatic mission to the United States. It is located at 1608 New Hampshire Avenue, Northwest, Washington, D.C., in the Dupont Circle neighborhood.

Tadeous Tafirenyika Chifamba was appointed ambassador to the US in October 2020 by Zimbabwe's president Emmerson Mnangagwa.

== Building ==
Constructed in 1917, the former private residence (past owners include Frederick Albion Ober-) was purchased by the Zimbabwe government in 1990 (previous occupant was the Institute for Soviet-American Relations). It is a contributing property to the Dupont Circle Historic District, and valued at $6,088,460.

== See also ==
- List of ambassadors of Zimbabwe to the United States
- List of diplomatic missions of Zimbabwe
