= Turkey–Zimbabwe relations =

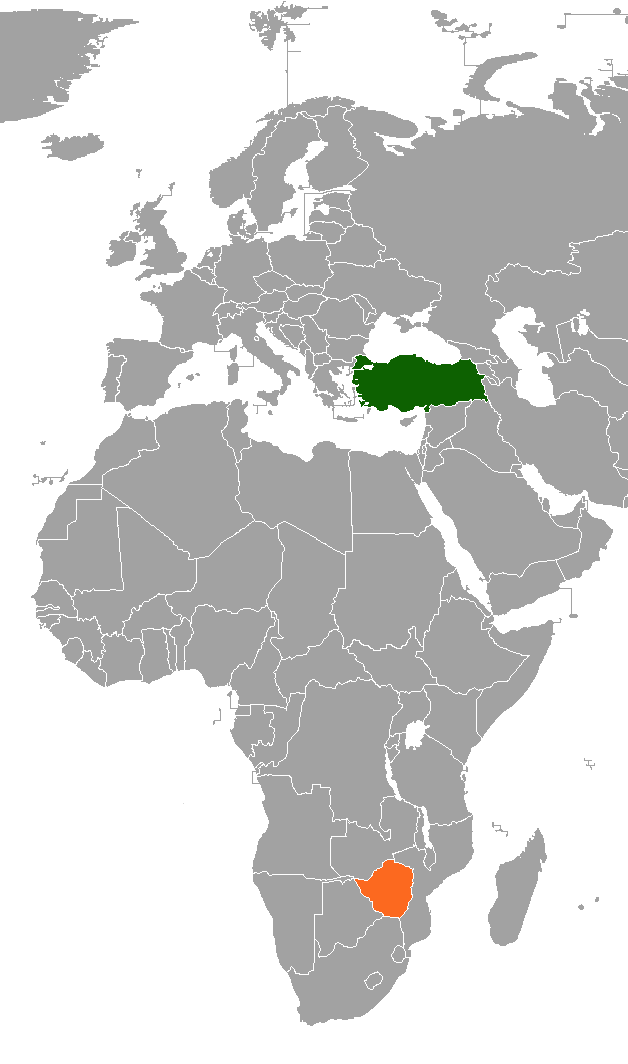

- Turkey: Zimbabwe

Turkey has an embassy in Harare. Zimbabwe opened its embassy in Ankara on October 3, 2019.

== Diplomatic relations ==
Turkey and Zimbabwe generally had friendly relations until 1990. Turkey did not recognize Rhodesian Front-led UDI of Rhodesia because of the lack of racial accommodation in the Rhodesian Front. In Rhodesia — the approximately 5% white community had a system similar to Jim Crow that sustained racial discrimination. After Ian Smith as Prime Minister of Rhodesia declared Rhodesian independence on November 11, 1965, Turkey joined the British to exert pressure on Ian Smith’s government through economic sanctions. When the economic sanctions largely failed, the black population of Rhodesia began to organize and were assisted by Mozambique’s Frente de Libertação de Moçambique that allowed ZANU’s guerrillas to set up bases in neighboring Mozambique and declared war on Ian Smith’s Rhodesia, which allowed for majority-rule in Zimbabwe.

By 1992, Turkey provided £47 million out of the £900 million in total that the international community pledged as foreign aid to the government formed by Robert Mugabe, who initially won plaudits for protecting the white community in Zimbabwe.

Turkey’s relations with Zimbabwe became very tense when Robert Mugabe’s government started confiscating white-owned farms without compensation and later ordered Operation Murambatsvina (chiShona: “cleaning up the shit”) to attack the Shona people who lived in the shantytowns around Harare, bulldozing 100,000 homes. This led to, according to UN estimates, the death of 1.2 million people.

== Economic relations ==
Trade volume between the two countries was US$17.7 million in 2018 (Turkish exports/imports: 5.9/11.8 million USD).

== See also ==
- Foreign relations of Turkey
- Foreign relations of Zimbabwe
