= List of ambassadors of Zimbabwe to the United States =

Coordinates: 38.911336°N 77.041875°W

Ambassador of Zimbabwe to the United States of America
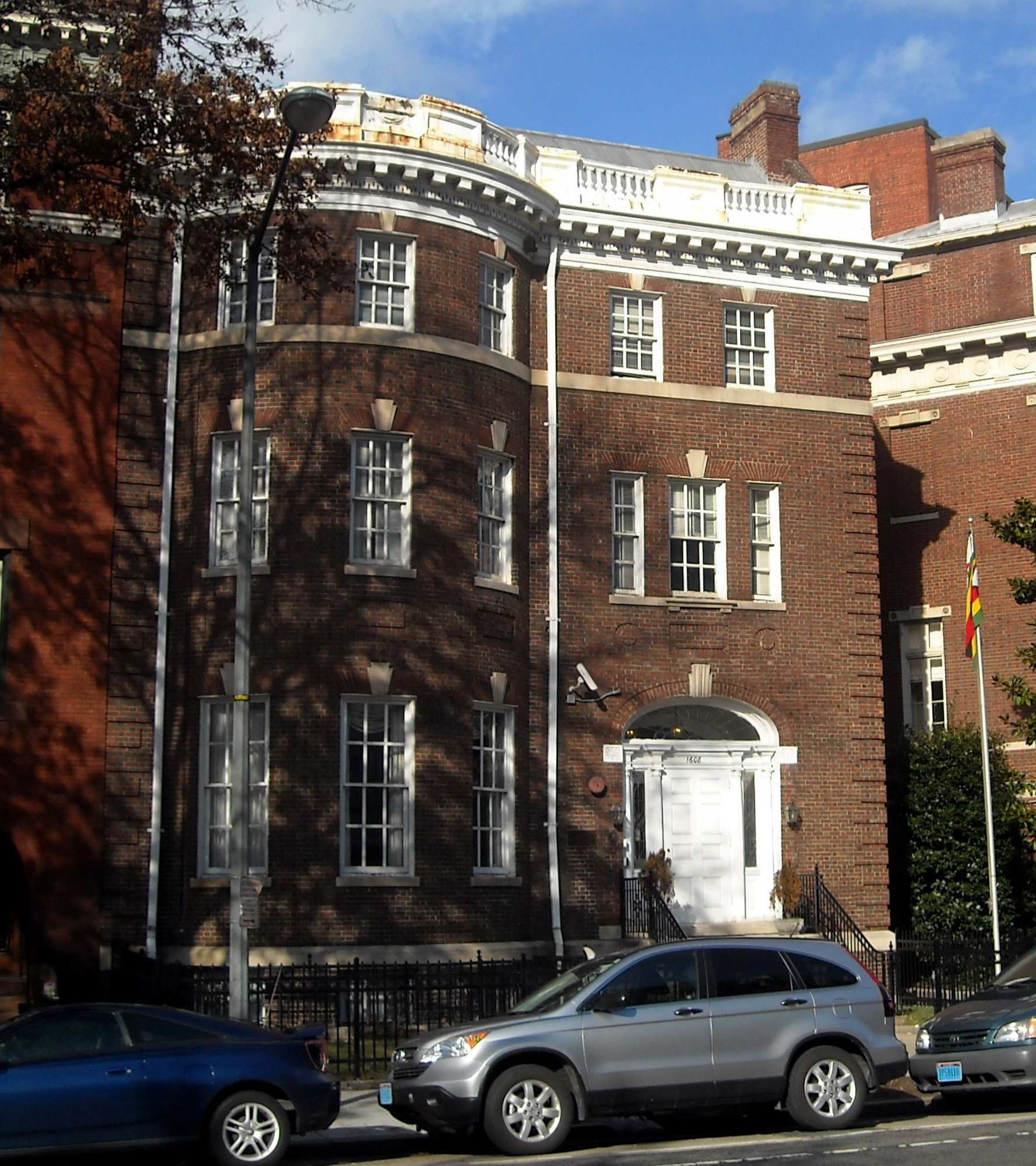
- Incumbent; Tadeous Tafirenyika Chifamba since October 2020
- Inaugural holder: Elleck Mashingaidze
- Formation: August 29, 1980

The Ambassador of Zimbabwe to the United States is the official representative of the Zimbabwean government at the Embassy of Zimbabwe in Washington, D.C.

== History of the office ==
On April 18, 1980, the governments in Harare and Washington, D.C. established diplomatic relations. The President of Zimbabwe at the time was Canaan Banana, and the President of the United States was Jimmy Carter.

== List of ambassadors ==
Image	Name	Appointment	Presentation	Left office	Appointer	Notes
	Ken Towsey	June 1980	—	28 August 1980	Ian Smith	Chargé d'affaires
	Elleck Mashingaidze	28 August 1980	29 August 1980	1982	Canaan Banana	
	Nicholas Goche	16 April 1982	—	1982	Canaan Banana	Chargé d'affaires
	Edmund Chipamaunga	29 April 1982	25 June 1982	1985	Canaan Banana	
	Edmund Garwe	25 February 1985	5 March 1985	1989	Canaan Banana	
	Stanislaus Chigwedere	6 September 1989	24 October 1989	1993	Robert Mugabe	
	Amos Midzi	12 March 1993	11 June 1993	1997	Robert Mugabe	
	Simbi Mubako	6 October 1999	29 November 1999	2005	Robert Mugabe	
	Machivenyika Mapuranga	30 November 2005	2 December 2005	2014	Robert Mugabe	
	Ammon Mutembwa	24 October 2014	18 November 2014	2017	Robert Mugabe	
	Tadeous Tafirenyika Chifamba	October 2020			Emmerson Mnangagwa	

== See also ==
- United States–Zimbabwe relations
- List of ambassadors of the United States to Zimbabwe
