= Germany–Zimbabwe relations =

Bilateral relations between Germany and Zimbabwe

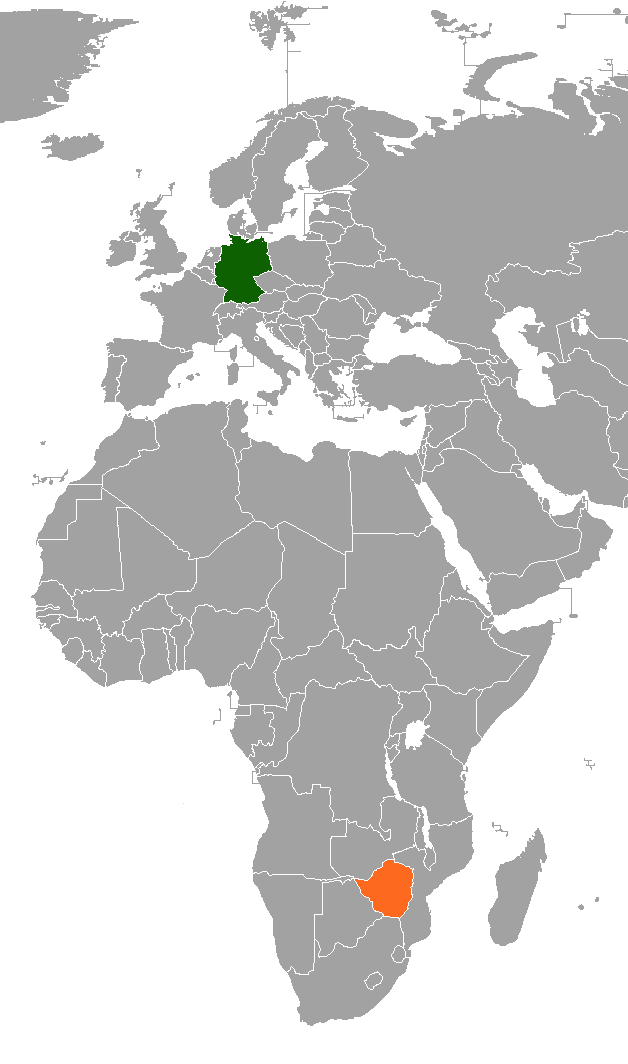

- Germany: Zimbabwe

Germany–Zimbabwe relations are the bilateral relations between the Federal Republic of Germany and Republic of Zimbabwe. Zimbabwe operates an embassy in Berlin and Germany operates an embassy in Harare.

== History ==
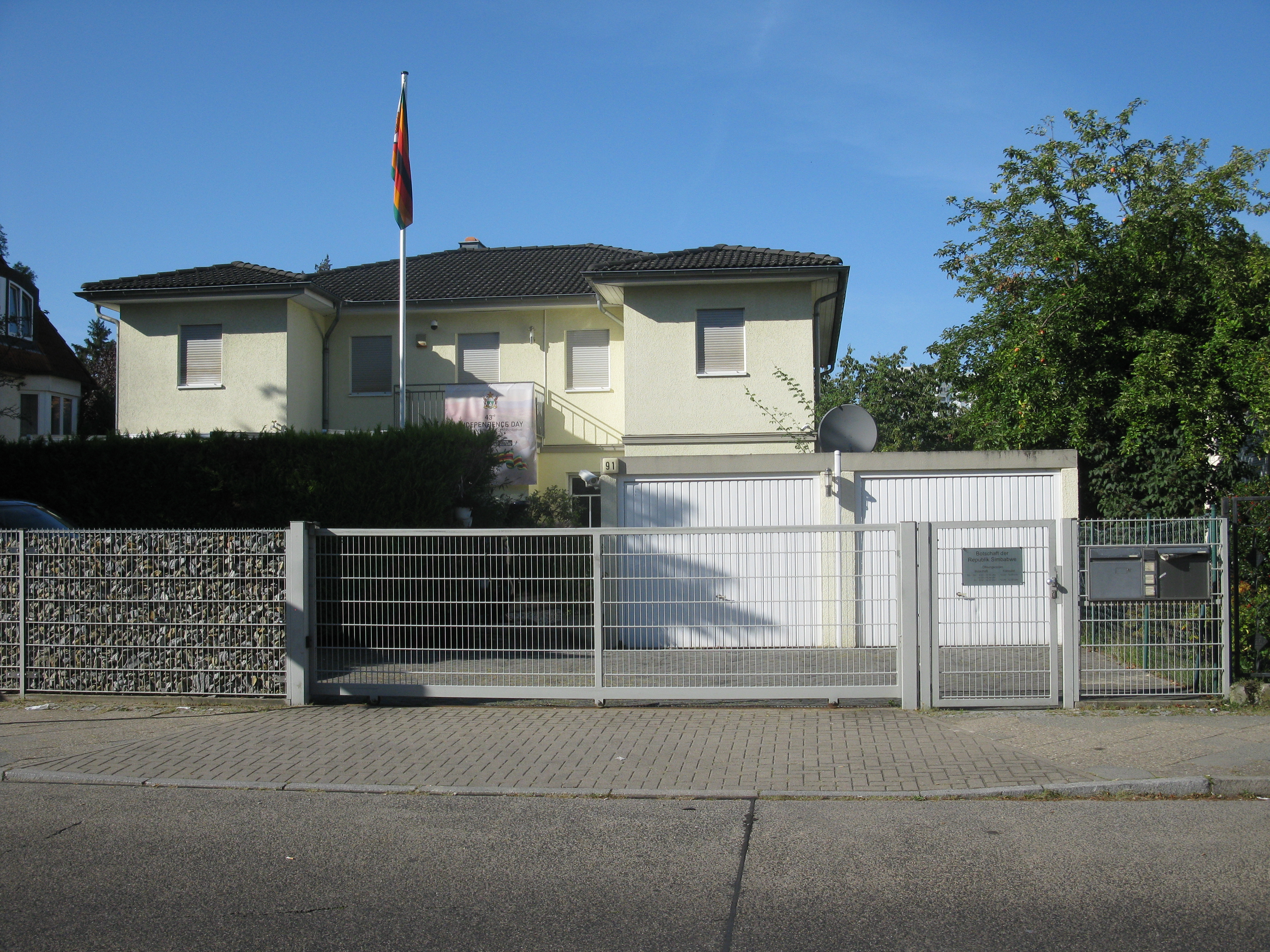
Embassy of Zimbabwe in Berlin

Relations between the two countries started when Zimbabwe gained independence in 1980. Germany was one of the largest providers of aid to Zimbabwe until the 1990s when Zimbabwe enacted land reforms to redistribute lands from White Zimbabweans, some of whom were German citizens, to the native African population. In 2002, EU imposed sanctions on members of the Zimbabwean African National Union, the dominant political party in Zimbabwe, with Germany's support. Germany froze dozens of bank accounts belonging to Zimbabwean political leaders and refused visas to Zimbabwean nationals.

During the 2007 EU-Africa summit meeting in Lisbon, Chancellor Angela Merkel denounced Robert Mugabe for human rights violations committed by Mugabe's government saying "I appreciate that some African states have tried to solve the crisis in Zimbabwe, but time is running out. The situation of Zimbabwe is damaging the image of the new Africa."

German-Zimbabwean relations thawed in 2009 when Zimbabwean Prime Minister Tsvangirai visited Germany to discuss easing sanctions on Zimbabwe. In 2010, Zimbabwe seized land belonging to Heinrich Von Pezold, a German National, which directly violated the terms of an investment agreement between Germany and Zimbabwe. In 2012, German Minister for Economic Development Dirk Niebel travelled to Zimbabwe to discuss aid, easing sanctions and opening Zimbabwe's market to German businesses. The EU lifted sanctions on Zimbabwe's political leaders and allowed visas to Europe later that year.

After the 2017 Zimbabwean coup d'état, Germany's development minister Gurd Mueller visited Zimbabwe to discuss bringing aid and economic development if President Mnangagwa agreed to political and economic reforms to build democratic structures in Zimbabwe and correct human right violations that happened under Mugabe.

In 2021, Germany provided 3 Million Euros to a United Nationals World Food Programme project for Zimbabwe.

== Culture ==
By 1998, Germany funded German teaching courses at the University of Zimbabwe and fund a Goethe-Zentrum in Harare.

== Trade ==
In 2022, Germany exported US$49 worth of goods to Zimbabwe with the most common export being Washing Machines. In 2019, Zimbabwe exported US$51 billion worth of goods to Germany, with the most common export being Tobacco.

== See also ==
- Foreign relations of Germany
- Foreign relations of Zimbabwe
