= Mexico–Zimbabwe relations =

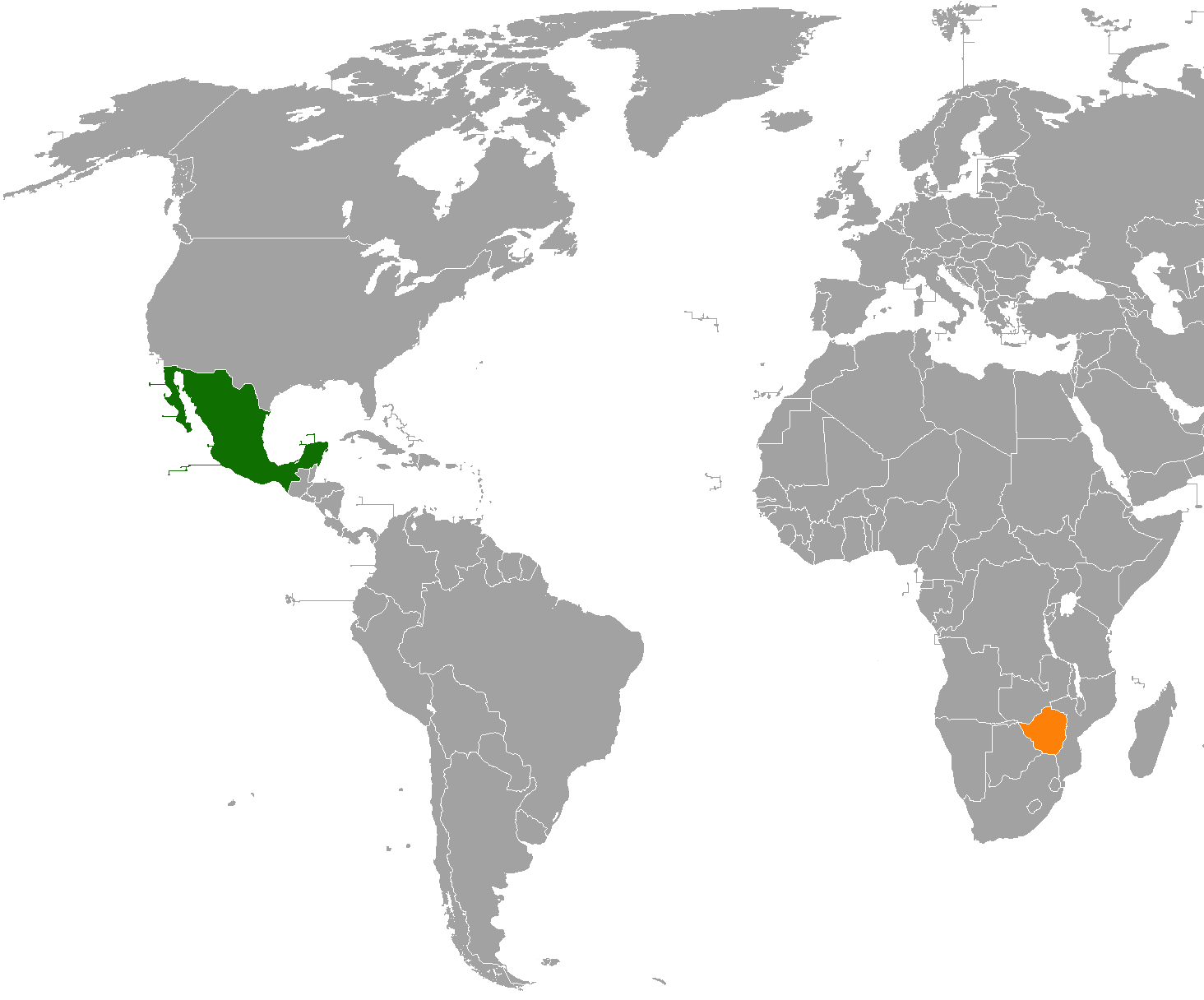

- Mexico: Zimbabwe

The nations of Mexico and Zimbabwe established diplomatic relations in 1985. Both nations are members of the Group of 15 and the United Nations.

== History ==
In 1965, Rhodesia (present day Zimbabwe) obtained its independence from the United Kingdom. Mexico refused to recognize or establish diplomatic relations with the nation due to its apartheid like system. At the end of the Rhodesian Bush War in December 1979, Rhodesia changed its name to Zimbabwe in 1980. Mexico and Zimbabwe established diplomatic relations in March 1985. In 1990, Mexico opened a resident embassy in Harare, however, the embassy was closed in 1994 and Mexico accredited its embassy in Pretoria, South Africa to Zimbabwe.

In September 1986, Mexican Foreign Minister Bernardo Sepúlveda Amor attended the Non-Aligned Movement conference celebrated in Harare. In November 1991, Mexican President Carlos Salinas de Gortari and Zimbabwean President Robert Mugabe met in Caracas, Venezuela during the Group of 15 summit.

In 1998, during the inauguration of South African President Thabo Mbeki, Mexican Foreign Minister Rosario Green met with President Robert Mugabe. In May 2017, President Mugabe paid a visit to Cancún, Mexico to attend the United Nations Cancun Conference on Disaster Risk Reduction, along with Foreign Minister Simbarashe Mumbengegwi and Minister of Environment Oppah Muchinguri.

In May 2013, Mexican Undersecretary of the Economy, Francisco de Rosenzweig, paid a visit to Zimbabwe, along with the Mexican Ambassador to Ethiopia, Juan Alfredo Miranda Ortiz, to promote the candidacy of Dr. Herminio Blanco Mendoza as Director-General of the World Trade Organization. Since 2008, the Mexican government offers each year scholarships for nationals of Zimbabwe to study postgraduate studies at Mexican higher education institutions.

In October 2024, Vice President Kembo Mohadi travelled to Mexico to attend the inauguration of President Claudia Sheinbaum.

== High-level visits ==
High-level visits from Mexico to Zimbabwe

- Foreign Minister Bernardo Sepúlveda Amor (1986)
- Undersecretary of the Economy Francisco de Rosenzweig (2013)

High-level visits from Zimbabwe to Mexico

- Minister of Environment Francis Nhema (2010)
- President Robert Mugabe (2017)
- Foreign Minister Simbarashe Mumbengegwi (2017)
- Minister of Environment Oppah Muchinguri (2017)
- Vice President Kembo Mohadi (2024)

== Trade ==
In 2023, trade between Mexico and Zimbabwe totaled US$1.7 million. Mexico's main exports to Zimbabwe include: medicines, telephones and mobile phones, and machinery. Zimbabwe's main exports to Mexico include: hides and skins, ferroalloys, mineral materials, air pumps or vacuum pumps, video game consoles, machinery parts, essential oils for makeup and creams, coconut and palm oil.

== Diplomatic missions ==
- Mexico is accredited to Zimbabwe from its embassy in Pretoria, South Africa.
- Zimbabwe is accredited to Mexico from its embassy in Washington, D.C., United States.

== See also ==
- List of ambassadors of Mexico to Zimbabwe
