= Poland–Zimbabwe relations =

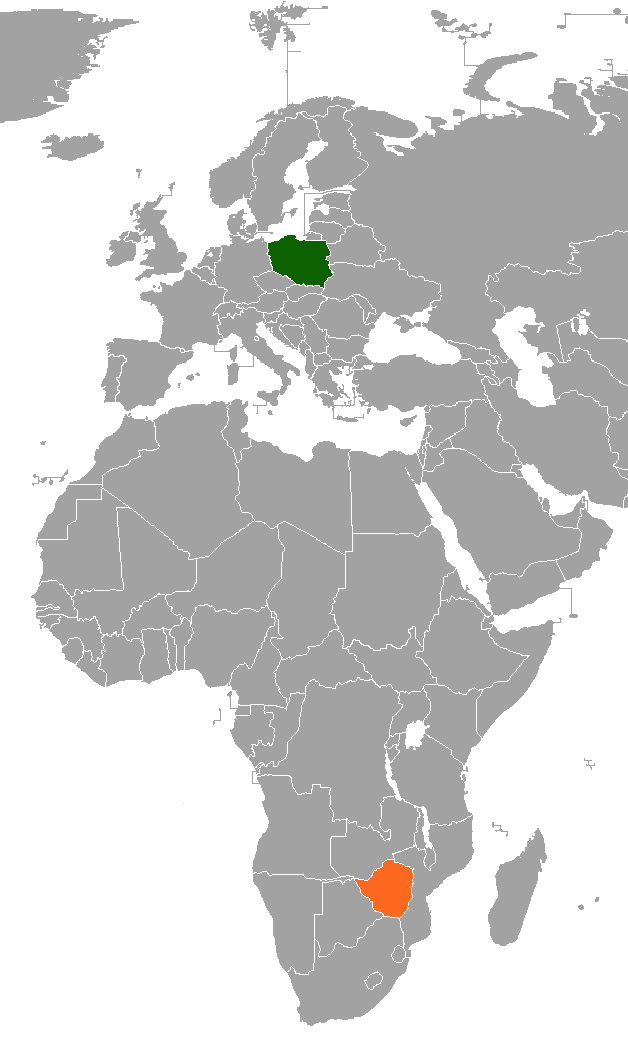

- Poland: Zimbabwe

Poland–Zimbabwe relations are the bilateral relations between Poland and Zimbabwe. Both nations are full members of the World Trade Organization and the United Nations.

== History ==
In April 1939, 1939, Poland established an honorary consulate in Salisbury, which was upgraded to a consulate-general in 1943 and closed in 1945.

During World War II, Polish refugees escaping the Soviet Union, were admitted in Southern Rhodesia, mostly in Rusape and Marondera. As of December 1944, their total number was 1,437. After the war, in 1946, all Poles in Southern Rhodesia were relocated to Gatooma from other refugee camps. A repatriation office was established in Gatooma, and 1,319 Poles were repatriated to Europe, 500 were relocated to Tanganyika, except for some 120 people who stayed.

On 27 May 1978, during the Zimbabwe War of Independence, Polish head of state Henryk Jabłoński received a delegation from the ZANU–PF with Joshua Nkomo, leader of the Zimbabwe African People's Union and future Vice-President of Zimbabwe, at the Belweder in Warsaw. Jabłoński declared that he believed the war would end in complete success for the Zimbabwean forces, and that Poland supported "their just causes and aspirations".

Bilateral relations between Poland and newly independent Zimbabwe were established in 1981.

A double tax avoidance treaty was signed in Harare in 1993.

== Modern relations ==
In 2019, a Polish World War II cemetery in Rusape was renovated with Polish funds. In 2022, the renovated cemetery was officially opened with the participation of the president of the Institute of National Remembrance, future president of Poland, Karol Nawrocki, and honorary consul of Poland in Zimbabwe, Krystyna Grabowska. The delegation of the Institute of National Remembrance and Karol Nawrocki also visited the National Archives of Zimbabwe in Harare.

Since 2018, there has been a significant increase in the number of students from Zimbabwe at Polish higher education institutions. Zimbabwean students were the fifth largest group of foreign students in Poland in 2021, the third largest in 2022 and the fourth largest in 2023 and 2024, at the same time being the largest group from Africa.

== Diplomatic missions ==
- Poland is accredited to Zimbabwe from its embassy in Pretoria, and there is an honorary consulate of Poland in Harare.
- Zimbabwe is accredited to Poland from its embassy in Berlin.
