= Elleck Mashingaidze =

Zimbabwean historian and diplomat

Elleck Kufakunesu Mashingaidze (born 4 April 1939) is a historian and diplomat from Zimbabwe. He served as Zimbabwe's first Ambassador to the United States of America and Zimbabwe's first Permanent Representative to the United Nations. He twice held the post of President of the United Nations Security Council (1983 and 1984).

He earned a PhD from the University of York.

He co-authored the history book "From Iron Age to Independence" (ISBN 9780582651111)

He was born in Mberengwa, Zimbabwe and is a member of the Lemba tribe. He is married to Sylvia Jane Mashingaidze (d. September 2009). They have two children: Kundai Mashingaidze and Tapiwa Mashingaidze.
