= Russia–Zimbabwe relations =

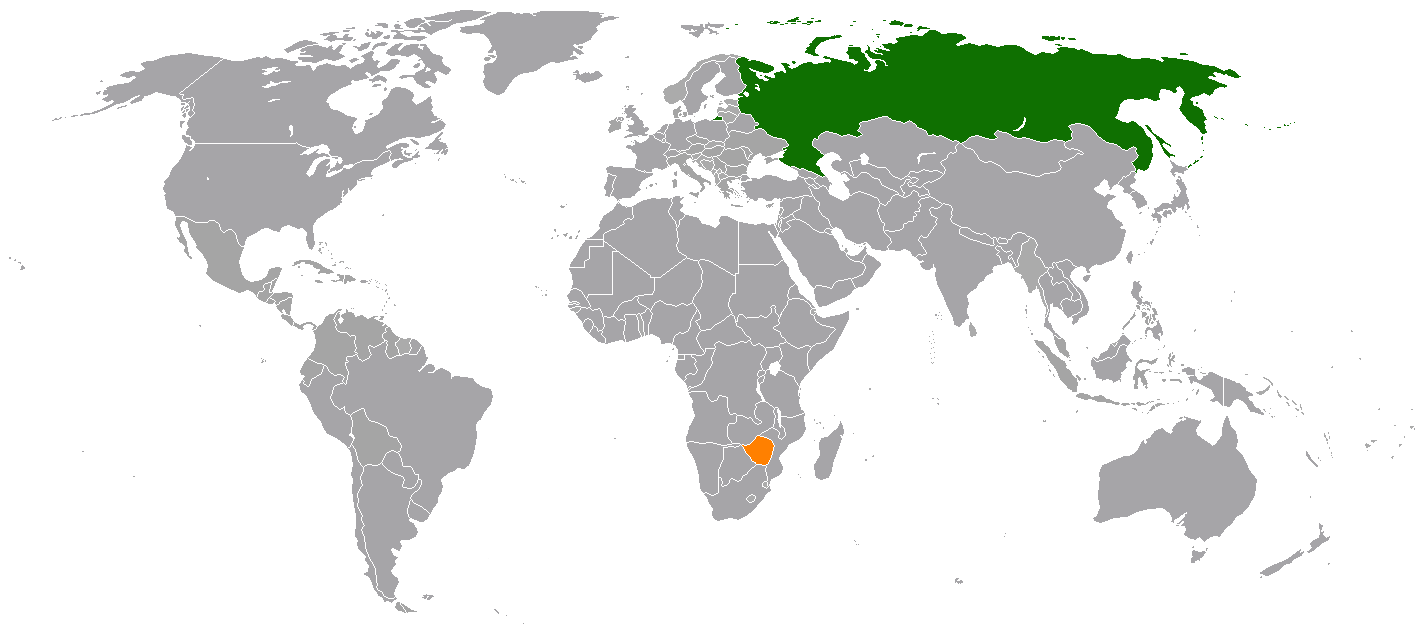

- Russia: Zimbabwe

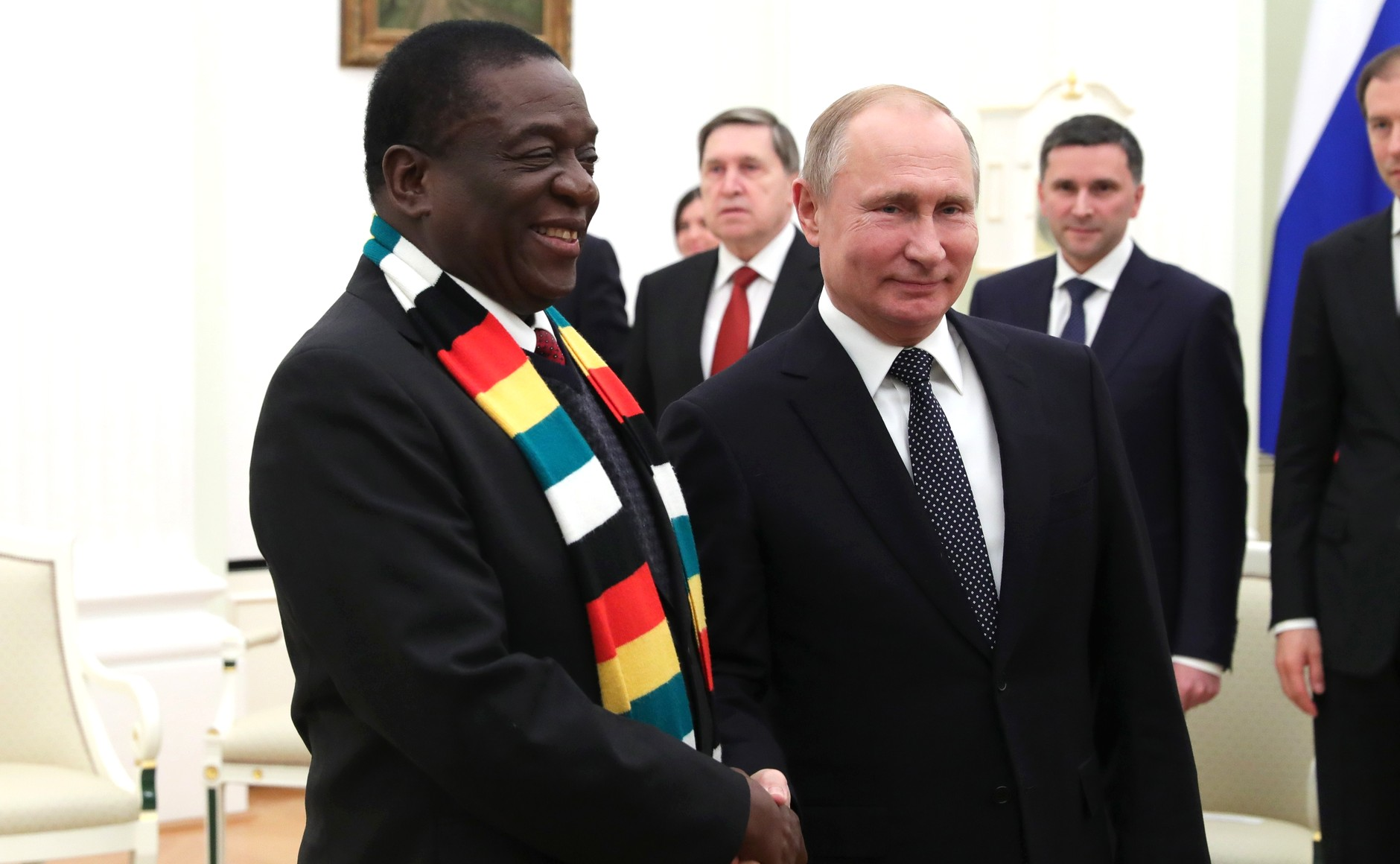
Presidents Vladimir Putin and Emmerson Mnangagwa on 15 January 2019

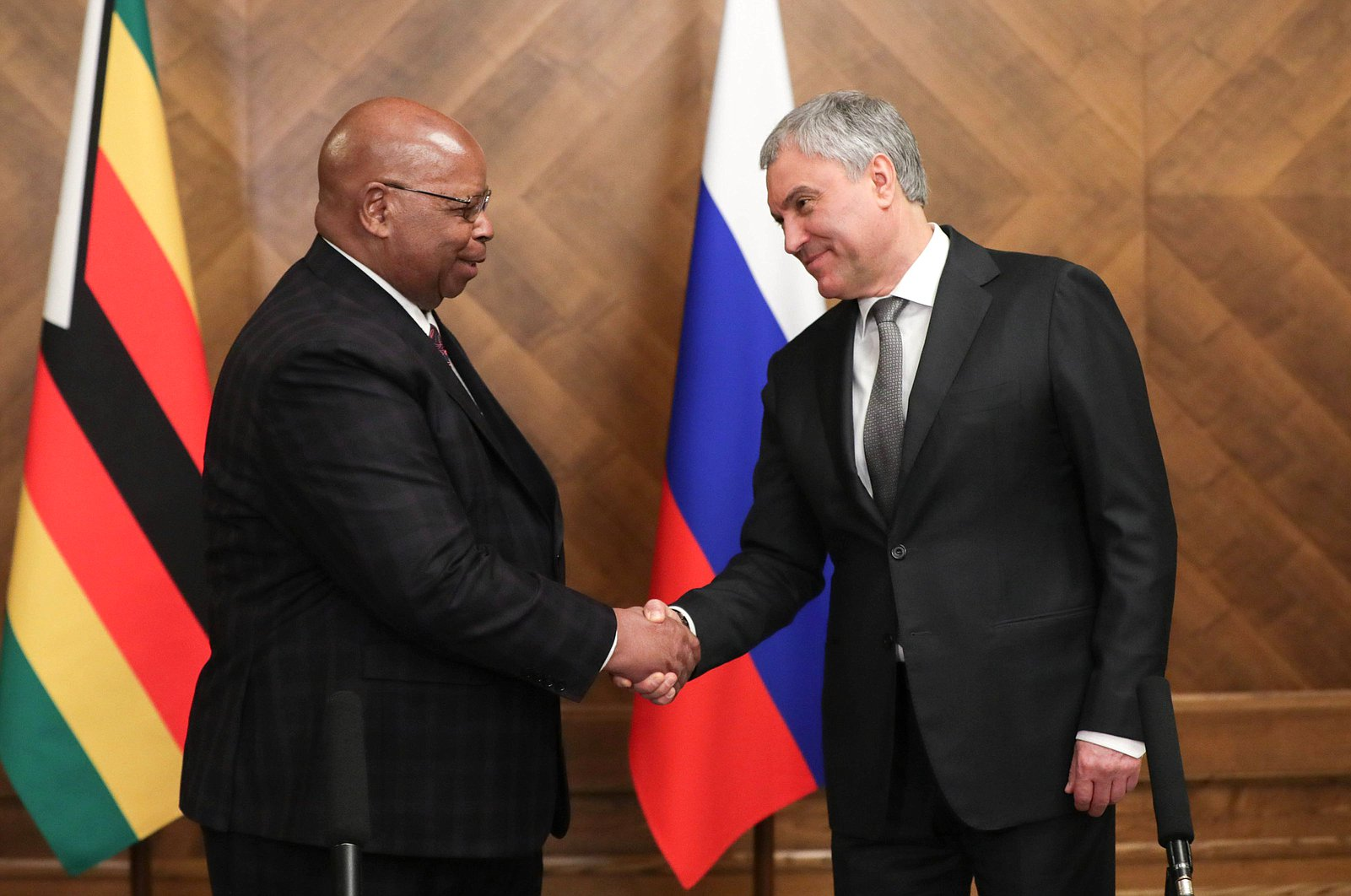
Jacob Mudenda and Vyacheslav Volodin on 19 March 2023

Russia – Zimbabwe relations (Russian: Российско-зимбабвийские отношения) are bilateral relations between Russia and Zimbabwe.

== 1960-2000 ==
The Russia–Zimbabwe relations date back to the mid-1960s, during the Rhodesian Bush War. The Soviet Union supported Joshua Nkomo's Zimbabwe African People's Union, and supplied them with arms; Robert Mugabe's attempts to gain Soviet support for his Zimbabwe African National Union were rebuffed, leading him to enter into relations with Soviet rival Beijing.
Throughout the 1980s Zimbabwean relations with the USSR were notoriously cold. Mugabe "stonewalled" the Soviets "for ten months" rather than establish relations with them while he was establishing relations with other countries including the United Kingdom and the United States. The agreement, the Soviets were forced to agree to, demanded they meet strict criteria about how they could operate in Zimbabwe, while no other country had to agree to similar concessions before establishing relations. The agreement was described as "embarrassing and humiliating for the Soviets since it singles them out."
Mugabe shunned Soviet help and allowed British military bases to be established in Zimbabwe against protests from Moscow. Mugabe also accepted the help of British military advisers and declined the same offers from the Soviet Union. Several American-made movies were aired in Zimbabwean movie theaters in the 1980s that the Soviets believed constituted "anti-Soviet propaganda," including the movies Invasion U.S.A., Red Dawn, Firefox, Rocky IV, Rambo: First Blood Part II, Water, The Living Daylights, The Whistle Blower, and Rambo III. The Soviet embassy officially protested, however, they were allegedly told by Mugabe "to complain to your ZIPRA friends."

== 21st Century ==
However, since the 2000s Robert Mugabe had strengthened his relations with both Beijing and Moscow as a result of intense western pressure on him. Zimbabwe was one of the few countries that voted with Russia on United Nations General Assembly Resolution 68/262 about the annexation of Crimea. Russia maintains strong economic and political ties with Zimbabwe. Russia still maintains an embassy in Harare. Both Russia and China still maintain strong economic and political ties with Zimbabwe and both countries had vetoed the UN resolution imposing UN sanctions on Zimbabwe which was proposed by both the US and the UK on July 12, 2008.

In 2023, Zimbabwean president Emmerson Mnangagwa voiced support for Russia in the Russo-Ukrainian war, saying that he and Putin "discussed the need for prosperity through peace as well as how our countries can work together to assure food security across the continent", adding that the "victims of sanctions must cooperate".

== See also ==
- List of ambassadors of Russia to Zimbabwe
