= List of diplomatic missions in Zimbabwe =

This is a list of diplomatic missions in Zimbabwe. The capital of the country, Harare, currently hosts 51 embassies. Several other countries have ambassadors accredited from other capital cities, mainly Pretoria, Lusaka, and Addis Ababa.

Following the withdrawal of Zimbabwe from the Commonwealth of Nations in 2003, most of the high commissions were changed to embassies.

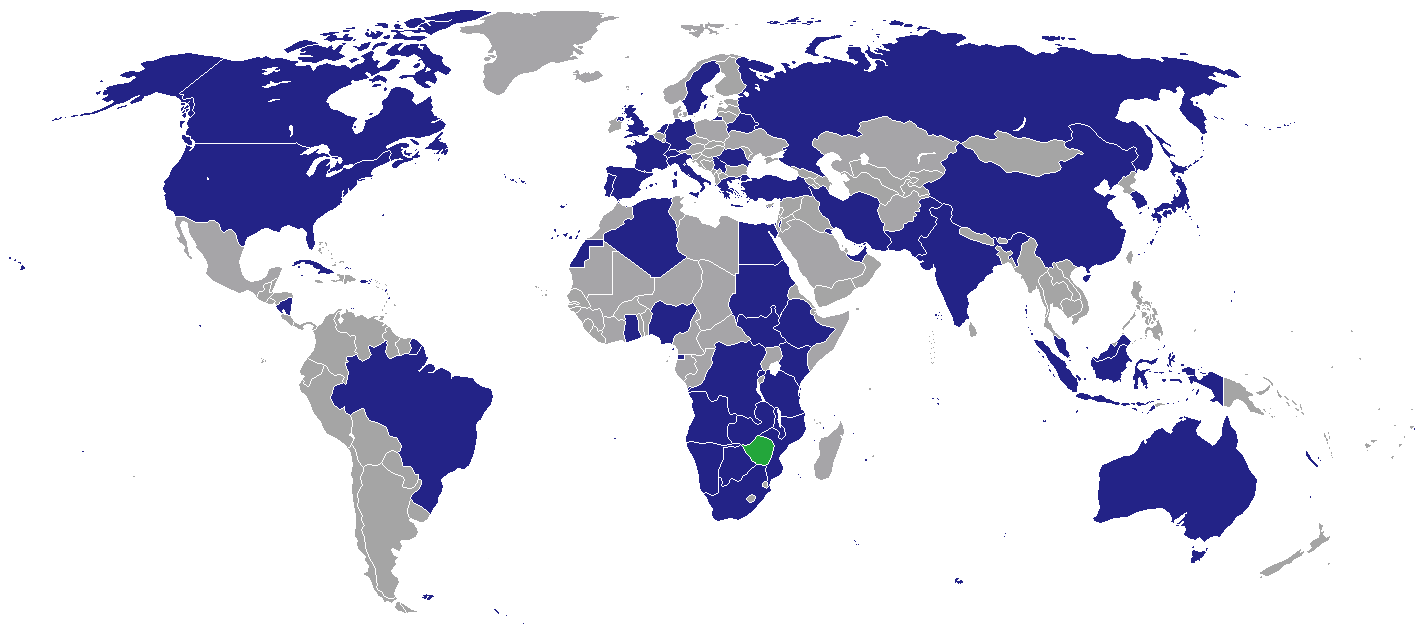
Map of diplomatic missions in Zimbabwe

== Diplomatic missions in Harare ==
=== Embassies ===
1. Algeria
2. Angola
3. Australia
4. Belarus
5. Botswana
6. Brazil
7. Canada
8. China
9. Cuba
10. Congo-Kinshasa
11. Equatorial Guinea
12. Egypt
13. Ethiopia
14. France
15. Germany
16. Ghana
17. Greece
18. Holy See
19. India
20. Indonesia
21. Iran
22. Italy
23. Japan
24. Kenya
25. Malawi
26. Malaysia
27. Mozambique
28. Namibia
29. Netherlands
30. Nicaragua
31. Nigeria
32. Pakistan
33. Palestine
34. Portugal
35. Romania
36. Russia
37. Rwanda
38. Sahrawi Republic
39. Serbia
40. South Africa
41. South Korea
42. South Sudan
43. Spain
44. Sudan
45. Switzerland
46. Tanzania
47. Turkey
48. United Arab Emirates
49. United Kingdom
50. United States
51. Zambia

=== Other posts and delegations ===
1. European Union (Delegation)
2. North Korea (Trade office)
3. United Nations (Resident coordinator's office)
4. World Health Organization (Country Office)

== Consular missions ==
=== Mutare, Manicaland Province ===
1. Mozambique (Consulate-General)

== Non-resident embassies ==
=== Resident in Lusaka, Zambia ===
1. Czechia
2. Finland
3. Saudi Arabia

=== Resident in Pretoria, South Africa ===
1. Argentina
2. Austria
3. Bangladesh
4. Belgium
5. Bulgaria
6. Burkina Faso
7. Burundi
8. Central African Republic
9. Cameroon
10. Chile
11. Congo-Brazzaville
12. Croatia
13. Cyprus
14. Denmark
15. Eritrea
16. Eswatini
17. Georgia
18. Hungary
19. Ireland
20. Jamaica
21. Lesotho
22. Liberia
23. Madagascar
24. Mali
25. Mauritania
26. Mauritius
27. Mexico
28. Nepal
29. New Zealand
30. North Korea
31. Norway
32. Oman
33. Panama
34. Paraguay
35. Peru
36. Poland
37. Philippines
38. Qatar
39. Senegal
40. Seychelles
41. Singapore
42. Slovakia
43. Somalia
44. Sri Lanka
45. Thailand
46. Trinidad and Tobago
47. Tunisia
48. Uganda
49. Ukraine
50. Uruguay
51. Vietnam

=== Resident in other cities ===
1. Bahamas (Ottawa)
2. Cape Verde (Luanda)
3. Guinea (Luanda)
4. Israel (Jerusalem)
5. Yemen (Addis Ababa)
6. Venezuela (Windhoek)

== Closed missions ==
Host city	Sending country	Mission	Year closed	Ref.
Harare	Argentina	Embassy	2002	
Harare	Austria	Embassy	2011	
Harare	Belgium	Embassy	2006	
Harare	Bulgaria	Embassy	Unknown	
Harare	Czech Republic	Embassy	2010	
Harare	Denmark	Embassy	2016	
Harare	Finland	Embassy	2002	
Harare	Kuwait	Embassy	2024	
Harare	Libya	Embassy	2011	
Harare	Mexico	Embassy	1994	
Harare	New Zealand	Embassy	1998	
Harare	North Korea	Embassy	1998	
Harare	Norway	Embassy	2016	
Harare	Poland	Embassy	2008	
Harare	Peru	Embassy	1990	
Harare	Slovakia	Embassy	2004	
Harare	Sweden	Embassy	2026	
Harare	Vietnam	Embassy	1990	
Harare	SFR Yugoslavia	Embassy	Unknown	

== See also ==
- Foreign relations of Zimbabwe
