= Alice Mashingaidze =

Zimbabwean diplomat

Alice Mashingaidze (born 25 April 1968) is a Zimbabwean diplomat. She is the current Zimbabwean ambassador to Sweden and has formerly served as ambassador to Belgium.

In February 2021 Mashingaidze led an Africa Cultural Festival with Makandire Luckson Chezhira Chikutu.
