= List of members of the 6th Parliament of Zimbabwe =

The 6th Parliament of Zimbabwe met between 2005 and 2008. At the time of the March 2005 parliamentary election, the Zimbabwean Parliament was unicameral, consisting of the 150-member House of Assembly. The Senate, abolished in 1989, was reintroduced in November 2005, consisting of 66 members. Of the 150 members in House of Assembly, 120 were elected via first-past-the-post voting in single-member constituencies. Of the remaining 30 seats, 12 members were appointed directly by the President, ten were provincial governors who were ex officio members, and eight seats were reserved for chiefs. (Note: Each province was represented by one chief, except for the metropolitan provinces of Bulawayo and Harare.) Fifty senators were elected in the same fashion as in the House of Assembly. Of the remaining 16 Senate seats, six were appointed directly by the President and ten were reserved for chiefs.

In the March 2005 election, the ruling Zimbabwe African National Union – Patriotic Front (ZANU–PF) won a 78-seat majority of the 120 elected seats, while the Movement for Democratic Change (MDC) won 41, a 16-seat decrease from its showing in the 2000 election. The remaining seat went to Jonathan Moyo, an independent. In the November 2005 Senate election, ZANU–PF won 43 of the 50 elected seats, with the MDC taking the remaining seven. The Senate election was boycotted by much of the MDC, and the issue of whether to participate led to a split in the party. Morgan Tsvangirai's MDC–T faction, which opposed participating in the Senate election, comprised the biggest portion of the former MDC, while Welshman Ncube's smaller MDC–N faction was formed by members who had been expelled by Tsvangirai from the original MDC for standing as Senate candidates against his orders.

The members of the 6th Parliament of Zimbabwe were sworn in on 12 April 2005. ZANU–PF's John Nkomo was elected Speaker unopposed. (Note: The MDC did not nominate a candidate for Speaker.) Edna Madzongwe, also of ZANU–PF, was elected Deputy Speaker, a position she held in the previous Parliament.

== Composition ==
=== House of Assembly ===
| | Party | | | Total | Vacant |
| | ZANU–PF | MDC (Note: After the 2005 parliamentary election and the start of the 6th Parliament, the Movement for Democratic Change split over the issue of whether to participate in the November 2005 Senate election. Morgan Tsvangirai's MDC–T faction, which opposed participating in the Senate election, comprised the biggest portion of the former MDC, while Welshman Ncube's smaller MDC–N faction was formed by members who had been expelled by Tsvangirai from the original MDC for standing as Senate candidates against his orders.) | Independent | Total | Vacant |
|---|---|---|---|---|---|
| End of previous Parliament | 68 | 51 | 1 (Note: The Chipinge South constituency was represented by Wilson Khumbula of ZANU–Ndonga.) | 120 | 0 |
| Start | 78 | 41 | 1 | 120 | 0 |
| 15 April 2005 | 77 | 41 | 1 | 119 | 1 |
| 18 June 2005 | 78 | 41 | 1 | 120 | 0 |
| 26 August 2005 | 77 | 41 | 1 | 119 | 1 |
| 26 November 2005 | 78 | 41 | 1 | 120 | 0 |
| 23 February 2006 | 78 | 40 | 1 | 119 | 1 |
| 20 May 2006 | 78 | 41 | 1 | 120 | 0 |
| 24 June 2006 | 77 | 41 | 1 | 119 | 1 |
| 1 July 2006 | 76 | 41 | 1 | 118 | 2 |
| 15 September 2006 | 75 | 41 | 1 | 117 | 3 |
| 7 October 2006 | 77 | 41 | 1 | 119 | 1 |
| 17 February 2007 | 78 | 41 | 1 | 120 | 0 |
| 2 March 2007 | 77 | 41 | 1 | 119 | 1 |
| 9 June 2007 | 78 | 41 | 1 | 120 | 0 |

== Elected members ==
=== Senate ===
| Name | Party | Constituency | Province | Notes |
|---|---|---|---|---|
| Sibangilizwe Msipa | MDC | Bulawayo–Makokoba | Bulawayo | |
| Rittah Ndlovu | MDC | Bulawayo–Nkulumane | Bulawayo | |
| Thabiso Ndlovu | MDC | Lobengula–Magwegwe | Bulawayo | |
| Greenfield Nyoni | MDC | Mpopoma–Pelandaba | Bulawayo | |
| Fanuel Bayayi | MDC | Pumula–Luveve | Bulawayo | |
| Forbes Magadu | ZANU–PF | Chitungwiza | Harare | |
| Charles Tavengwa | ZANU–PF | Glen View–Glen Norah–Highfield–Budiriro | Harare | |
| Livia Gumbura | ZANU–PF | Harare–Mabvuku–Tafira | Harare | |
| Vivian Muchicho | ZANU–PF | Harare–Mbare–Hatfield | Harare | |
| Sabina Thembani | ZANU–PF | Mufakose–Kuwadzana–Kambuzuma–Dzivaresekwa | Harare | |
| Egneti Makono | ZANU–PF | Buhera–Makoni | Manicaland | |
| Stanley Sakupwanya | ZANU–PF | Makoni–Nyanga | Manicaland | |
| Mandy Chimene | ZANU–PF | Mutasa–Mutare | Manicaland | |
| Henry Chikumbiro | ZANU–PF | Mutare | Manicaland | |
| Tobias Matanga | ZANU–PF | Chipinge–Chimanimani | Manicaland | |
| Betty Chikava | ZANU–PF | Bindura–Shamva | Mashonaland Central | |
| Stefano Mukusha | ZANU–PF | Guruve | Mashonaland Central | |
| Agnes Dete | ZANU–PF | Mazowe | Mashonaland Central | |
| Alice Chimbudzi | ZANU–PF | Mount Darwin–Muzarabani | Mashonaland Central | |
| Diamond Mumvuri | ZANU–PF | Rushinga–Mount Darwin | Mashonaland Central | |
| Rosemary Goto | ZANU–PF | Chikomba–Wedza | Mashonaland East | |
| Tracy Mutinhiri | ZANU–PF | Marondera–Seke | Mashonaland East | |
| Oria Kabayanjiri | ZANU–PF | Mudzi–Uzumba–Maramba–Pfungwe | Mashonaland East | |
| Siriro Majuru | ZANU–PF | Murehwa–Goromonzi | Mashonaland East | |
| Edmond Jacob | ZANU–PF | Mutoko | Mashonaland East | |
| Cephas Chikwanha | ZANU–PF | Chegutu–Manyame–Mhondoro | Mashonaland West | |
| Phone Madiro | ZANU–PF | Hurungwe–Kariba | Mashonaland West | |
| Chiratidzo Gava | ZANU–PF | Kadoma–Sanyati–Ngezi | Mashonaland West | |
| Douglas Mombeshora | ZANU–PF | Makonde–Chinhoyi | Mashonaland West | |
| Virginia Muchengeti | ZANU–PF | Zvimba | Mashonaland West | |
| Anna Rungani | ZANU–PF | Bikita–Zaka | Masvingo | |
| Jefta Chindanya | ZANU–PF | Chiredzi–Zaka | Masvingo | |
| Samuel Mumbengegwi | ZANU–PF | Chiva–Mwenezi | Masvingo | |
| Vitalis Zvinavashe | ZANU–PF | Gutu | Masvingo | |
| Dzikamai Mavhaire | ZANU–PF | Masvingo | Masvingo | |
| Herbert Sinampande | MDC | Binga | Matabeleland North | |
| Lot Mbambo | ZANU–PF | Bubi–Mguza | Matabeleland North | |
| Grace Dube | ZANU–PF | Hwange East | Matabeleland North | |
| Dalumuzi Khumalo | MDC | Lupane–Nkayi | Matabeleland North | |
| Josephine Moyo | ZANU–PF | Tsholotsho–Hwange | Matabeleland North | |
| Tambudzani Mohadi | ZANU–PF | Beitbridge | Matabeleland South | |
| Eunice Sandi | ZANU–PF | Bulilima–Mangwe | Matabeleland South | |
| Alma Mkhwebu | ZANU–PF | Gwanda | Matabeleland South | |
| Naison Ndlovu | ZANU–PF | Insiza | Matabeleland South | |
| Ananias Nyathi | ZANU–PF | Matobo–Umzingwane | Matabeleland South | |
| Clarissa Muchengeti | ZANU–PF | Chirumanzu–Kwekwe–Silobela | Midlands | |
| Shaddy Sai | ZANU–PF | Gokwe | Midlands | |
| Leonard Munotengwa | ZANU–PF | Gokwe–Zhombe | Midlands | |
| Tsitsi Muzenda | ZANU–PF | Gweru–Shurugwi | Midlands | |
| Richard Hove | ZANU–PF | Mberengwa–Zvishavane | Midlands | |

=== House of Assembly ===
| Name | Party | Constituency | Province | Notes |
|---|---|---|---|---|
| Welshman Ncube | MDC | Bulawayo East | Bulawayo | |
| David Coltart | MDC | Bulawayo South | Bulawayo | |
| Fletcher Dulini | MDC | Lobengula–Magwegwe | Bulawayo | |
| Thokozani Khuphe | MDC | Makokoba | Bulawayo | |
| Gibson Sibanda | MDC | Nkulumane | Bulawayo | |
| Milton Gwetu | MDC | Pelandaba–Mpopoma | Bulawayo | |
| Esaph Mdhlongwa | MDC | Pumula–Luveve | Bulawayo | |
| Gilbert Shoko | MDC | Budiriro | Harare | Died 23 February 2006. |
| Fidelis Mhashu | MDC | Chitungwiza | Harare | |
| Edwin Mushoriwa | MDC | Dzivarasekwa | Harare | |
| Priscilla Misihairabwi-Mushonga | MDC | Glen Norah | Harare | |
| Paul Madzore | MDC | Glen View | Harare | |
| Murisi Zwizwai | MDC | Harare Central | Harare | |
| Tendai Biti | MDC | Harare East | Harare | |
| Trudy Stevenson | MDC | Harare North | Harare | |
| Hubert Nyanhongo | ZANU–PF | Harare South | Harare | |
| Tapiwa Mashakada | MDC | Hatfield | Harare | |
| Pearson Mungofa | MDC | Highfield | Harare | |
| Willias Madzimure | MDC | Kambuzuma | Harare | |
| Nelson Chamisa | MDC | Kuwadzana | Harare | |
| Gift Chimanikire | MDC | Mbare | Harare | |
| Paurina Mpariwa | MDC | Mufakose | Harare | |
| Job Sikhala | MDC | St Mary's | Harare | |
| Timothy Mabhawu | MDC | Tafara–Mabvuku | Harare | |
| Goodrich Chimbaira | MDC | Zengeza | Harare | |
| William Mutomba | ZANU–PF | Buhera North | Manicaland | |
| Kumbirai Kangai | ZANU–PF | Buhera South | Manicaland | |
| Samuel Undenge | ZANU–PF | Chimanimani | Manicaland | |
| Morris Sakabuya | ZANU–PF | Chipinge North | Manicaland | |
| Enock Porusingazi | ZANU–PF | Chipinge South | Manicaland | |
| Shadreck Chipanga | ZANU–PF | Makoni East | Manicaland | |
| Didymus Mutasa | ZANU–PF | Makoni North | Manicaland | |
| Joseph Made | ZANU–PF | Makoni West | Manicaland | |
| Innocent Gonese | MDC | Mutare Central | Manicaland | |
| Giles Mutsekwa | MDC | Mutare North | Manicaland | |
| Freddy Kadzama | ZANU–PF | Mutare South | Manicaland | |
| Christopher Mushowe | ZANU–PF | Mutare West | Manicaland | |
| Michael Nyambuya | ZANU–PF | Mutasa North | Manicaland | |
| Oppah Muchinguri | ZANU–PF | Mutasa South | Manicaland | |
| Paul Kadzima | ZANU–PF | Nyanga | Manicaland | |
| Elliot Manyika | ZANU–PF | Bindura | Mashonaland Central | |
| David Butau | ZANU–PF | Guruve North | Mashonaland Central | |
| Edward Chindori-Chininga | ZANU–PF | Guruve South | Mashonaland Central | |
| Chenhamo Chimutingwende | ZANU–PF | Mazowe East | Mashonaland Central | |
| Sabina Zinyemba | ZANU–PF | Mazowe West | Mashonaland Central | |
| Joice Mujuru | ZANU–PF | Mount Darwin North | Mashonaland Central | |
| Saviour Kasukuwere | ZANU–PF | Mount Darwin South | Mashonaland Central | |
| Luke Mushore | ZANU–PF | Muzarabani | Mashonaland Central | |
| Sandra Machirori | ZANU–PF | Rushinga | Mashonaland Central | Died 1 July 2006. |
| Nicholas Goche | ZANU–PF | Shamva | Mashonaland Central | |
| Tichaona Jokonya | ZANU–PF | Chikomba | Mashonaland East | Died 24 June 2006. |
| Herbert Murerwa | ZANU–PF | Goromonzi | Mashonaland East | |
| Aeneas Chigwedere | ZANU–PF | Hwedza | Mashonaland East | |
| Sydney Sekeramayi | ZANU–PF | Marondera East | Mashonaland East | |
| Ambrose Mutinhiri | ZANU–PF | Marondera West | Mashonaland East | |
| Ray Kaukonde | ZANU–PF | Mudzi East | Mashonaland East | Left office 15 April 2005. |
| Aqualinah Katsande | ZANU–PF | Mudzi West | Mashonaland East | |
| David Parirenyatwa | ZANU–PF | Murehwa North | Mashonaland East | |
| Joel Biggie Matiza | ZANU–PF | Murehwa South | Mashonaland East | |
| David Chapfika | ZANU–PF | Mutoko North | Mashonaland East | |
| Olivia Muchena | ZANU–PF | Mutoko South | Mashonaland East | |
| Phineas Chihota | ZANU–PF | Seke | Mashonaland East | |
| Kenneth Mutiwekuziva | ZANU–PF | Uzumba–Maramba–Pfungwe | Mashonaland East | |
| Webster Shamu | ZANU–PF | Chegutu | Mashonaland West | |
| Faber Chidarikire | ZANU–PF | Chinhoyi | Mashonaland West | |
| Reuben Marumahoko | ZANU–PF | Hurungwe East | Mashonaland West | |
| Cecilia Gwachirwa | ZANU–PF | Hurungwe West | Mashonaland West | |
| Editor Matamisa | MDC | Kadoma | Mashonaland West | |
| Jonathan Chandengenda | ZANU–PF | Kariba | Mashonaland West | |
| Leo Mugabe | ZANU–PF | Makonde | Mashonaland West | |
| Patrick Zhuwao | ZANU–PF | Manyame | Mashonaland West | |
| Sylvester Nguni | ZANU–PF | Mhondoro | Mashonaland West | |
| Bright Matonga | ZANU–PF | Ngezi | Mashonaland West | |
| Zachariah Ziyambi | ZANU–PF | Sanyati | Mashonaland West | |
| Ignatius Chombo | ZANU–PF | Zvimba North | Mashonaland West | |
| Sabina Mugabe | ZANU–PF | Zvimba South | Mashonaland West | |
| Kennedy Matimba | ZANU–PF | Bikita East | Masvingo | |
| Claudius Makova | ZANU–PF | Bikita West | Masvingo | |
| Celine Pote | ZANU–PF | Chiredzi North | Masvingo | |
| Aaron Baloyi | ZANU–PF | Chiredzi South | Masvingo | Died 15 September 2006. |
| Enita Maziriri | ZANU–PF | Chivi North | Masvingo | |
| Charles Majange | ZANU–PF | Chivi South | Masvingo | |
| Josiah Tungamirai | ZANU–PF | Gutu North | Masvingo | Died 26 August 2005. |
| Shuvai Mahofa | ZANU–PF | Gutu South | Masvingo | |
| Tongai Matutu | MDC | Masvingo Central | Masvingo | |
| Stan Mudenge | ZANU–PF | Masvingo North | Masvingo | |
| Walter Mzembi | ZANU–PF | Masvingo South | Masvingo | |
| Isaiah Shumba | ZANU–PF | Mwenezi | Masvingo | |
| Tinos Rusere | ZANU–PF | Zaka East | Masvingo | Died 2 March 2007. |
| Mabel Mawere | ZANU–PF | Zaka West | Masvingo | |
| Joel Gabuza | MDC | Binga | Matabeleland North | |
| Obert Mpofu | ZANU–PF | Bubi–Mguza | Matabeleland North | |
| Thembikosi Sibindi | MDC | Hwange East | Matabeleland North | |
| Jealous Sansole | MDC | Hwange West | Matabeleland North | |
| Njabuliso Mguni | MDC | Lupane | Matabeleland North | |
| Abednico Bhebhe | MDC | Nkayi | Matabeleland North | |
| Jonathan Moyo | Independent | Tsholotsho | Matabeleland North | |
| Kembo Mohadi | ZANU–PF | Beitbridge | Matabeleland South | |
| Moses Ndlovu | MDC | Bulilima | Matabeleland South | |
| Abednico Ncube | ZANU–PF | Gwanda | Matabeleland South | |
| Andrew Langa | ZANU–PF | Insiza | Matabeleland South | |
| Edward Mkhosi | MDC | Mangwe | Matabeleland South | |
| Lovemore Moyo | MDC | Matobo | Matabeleland South | |
| Nomalanga Khumalo | MDC | Umzingwane | Matabeleland South | |
| Edwin Muguti | ZANU–PF | Chirumanzu | Midlands | |
| Lovemore Mupukuta | ZANU–PF | Gokwe | Midlands | |
| Leonard Chikomba | ZANU–PF | Gokwe Chireya | Midlands | |
| Jaison Machaya | ZANU–PF | Gokwe Kana | Midlands | |
| Flora Buka | ZANU–PF | Gokwe Nembudziya | Midlands | |
| Esther Nyauchi | ZANU–PF | Gokwe Sengwa | Midlands | |
| Josphat Madubeko | ZANU–PF | Gweru Rural | Midlands | |
| Timothy Mukahlera | MDC | Gweru Urban | Midlands | |
| Blessing Chebundo | MDC | Kwekwe | Midlands | |
| Rugare Gumbo | ZANU–PF | Mberengwa East | Midlands | |
| Jorum Gumbo | ZANU–PF | Mberengwa West | Midlands | |
| Amos Chibaya | MDC | Mkoba | Midlands | |
| Francis Nhema | ZANU–PF | Shurugwi | Midlands | |
| Abednico Malinga | MDC | Silobela | Midlands | |
| Daniel Mackenzie Ncube | ZANU–PF | Zhombe | Midlands | |
| Obert Matshalaga | ZANU–PF | Zvishavane | Midlands | |

== Unelected members ==
=== Senate ===
| Name | Party | Type | Notes |
|---|---|---|---|
| Aguy Georgias | ZANU–PF | Presidential appointee | |
| Peter Haritatos | ZANU–PF | Presidential appointee | |
| Sheila Mahere | ZANU–PF | Presidential appointee | |
| Joshua Teke Malinga | ZANU–PF | Presidential appointee | |
| Tazvitya Mapfumo | ZANU–PF | Presidential appointee | |
| Kantibhai Patel | ZANU–PF | Presidential appointee | |
| Missing | ZANU–PF (Note: The chiefs, while not officially affiliated with any party, were in practice supportive of ZANU–PF.) | Chief | |
| Missing | ZANU–PF | Chief | |
| Missing | ZANU–PF | Chief | |
| Missing | ZANU–PF | Chief | |
| Missing | ZANU–PF | Chief | |
| Missing | ZANU–PF | Chief | |
| Missing | ZANU–PF | Chief | |
| Missing | ZANU–PF | Chief | |
| Missing | ZANU–PF | Chief | |
| Missing | ZANU–PF | Chief | |

=== House of Assembly ===
| Name | Party | Type | Province | Notes |
|---|---|---|---|---|
| Patrick Chinamasa | ZANU–PF | Presidential appointee | – | |
| Abigail Damasane | ZANU–PF | Presidential appointee | – | |
| Edna Madzongwe | ZANU–PF | Presidential appointee | – | |
| Titus Maluleke | ZANU–PF | Presidential appointee | – | |
| Paul Mangwana | ZANU–PF | Presidential appointee | – | |
| Amos Midzi | ZANU–PF | Presidential appointee | – | |
| Emmerson Mnangagwa | ZANU–PF | Presidential appointee | – | |
| Joseph Msika | ZANU–PF | Presidential appointee | – | |
| Simbarashe Mumbengegwi | ZANU–PF | Presidential appointee | – | |
| Munacho Mutezo | ZANU–PF | Presidential appointee | – | |
| Sikhanyiso Ndlovu | ZANU–PF | Presidential appointee | – | |
| Canisia Sathiwa | ZANU–PF | Presidential appointee | – | |
| Cain Mathema | ZANU–PF | Provincial governor | Bulawayo | |
| Vacant (Note: The previous governor, Witness Mangwende, left office on 26 February 2005, prior to the opening of the 6th Parliament of Zimbabwe.) | – | Provincial governor | Harare | |
| Tinaye Chigudu | ZANU–PF | Provincial governor | Manicaland | |
| Ephraim Masawi | ZANU–PF | Provincial governor | Mashonaland Central | |
| David Karimanzira | ZANU–PF | Provincial governor | Mashonaland East | Karimanzira was replaced as governor on 15 April 2005. |
| Nelson Samkange | ZANU–PF | Provincial governor | Mashonaland West | |
| Willard Chiwewe | ZANU–PF | Provincial governor | Masvingo | |
| Thokozile Mathuthu | ZANU–PF | Provincial governor | Matabeleland North | |
| Angelina Masuku | ZANU–PF | Provincial governor | Matabeleland South | |
| Cephas Msipa | ZANU–PF | Provincial governor | Midlands | |
| George Chimombe | ZANU–PF | Chief | Manicaland | |
| Show Bushu | ZANU–PF | Chief | Mashonaland Central | |
| Patrick Mudzimurema | ZANU–PF | Chief | Mashonaland East | |
| Try Dandawa | ZANU–PF | Chief | Mashonaland West | |
| Fortune Charumbira | ZANU–PF | Chief | Masvingo | |
| Missing | ZANU–PF | Chief | Matabeleland North | |
| Christopher Malaba | ZANU–PF | Chief | Matabeleland South | |
| Cyprian Malisa | ZANU–PF | Chief | Midlands | |

== Membership changes ==
=== House of Assembly ===
| Constituency | Vacated by | Party | Reason for change | Successor | Party | Elected/appointed |
|---|---|---|---|---|---|---|
| Mudzi East | Ray Kaukonde | ZANU–PF | Kaukonde became governor of Mashonaland East on 15 April 2005. | Joseph Musa | ZANU–PF | 18 June 2005 |
| Governor of Mashonaland East | David Karimanzira | ZANU–PF | Karimanzira was replaced as governor on 15 April 2005. | Ray Kaukonde | ZANU–PF | 15 April 2005 |
| Gutu North | Josiah Tungamirai | ZANU–PF | Tungamirai died on 26 August 2005. | Lovemore Matuke | ZANU–PF | 26 November 2005 |
| Governor of Harare | Vacant | – | The previous governor, Witness Mangwende, died in office on 26 February 2005, prior to the opening of Parliament. | David Karimanzira | ZANU–PF | 2005 |
| Budiriro | Gilbert Shoko | MDC | Shoko died on 23 February 2006. | Emmanuel Chisvuure | MDC–T (Note: The issue of whether to participate in the November 2005 Senate election caused the MDC to split into the MDC–T and MDC–N. The Budiriro by-election was the first contest between the rival factions, and saw the MDC–T win easily.) | 20 May 2006 |
| Chikomba | Tichaona Jokonya | ZANU–PF | Jokonya died on 24 June 2006. | Steven Chiurayi | ZANU–PF | 7 October 2006 |
| Rushinga | Sandra Machirori | ZANU–PF | Machirori died on 1 July 2006. | Lazarus Dokora | ZANU–PF | 7 October 2006 |
| Chiredzi South | Aaron Baloyi | ZANU–PF | Baloyi died on 15 September 2006. | Kallisto Gwanetsa | ZANU–PF | 17 February 2007 |
| Zaka East | Tinos Rusere | ZANU–PF | Rusere died on 2 March 2007. | Livingstone Chineka | ZANU–PF | 9 June 2007 (Note: Both the MDC–T and MDC–N factions boycotted the by-election.) |
