= Monica Mary Ncube =

Monica Mary Ncube (born 1949) is a Zimbabwean-Canadian religious sister and nurse. Since 2017 she has been Superior General of the Missionary Sisters of the Precious Blood.

== Life ==
Monica Mary Ncube was born in Plumtree, Zimbabwe in 1949.

From 1978 to 1982 Ncube trained as a nurse in America. She worked in various Zimbabwean mission stations, at Regina Mundi, Empandeni, Brunapeg and St. Joseph. In 2005 she was transferred to Canada, and has become a Canadian citizen. In 2014 she became the Provincial Superior of the North American Province. In 2017 she was elected Superior General, and in September 2022 was re-elected for another five-year term.
