= Pumula =

Pumula may refer to:

- Prunus pumula, a species of cherry plant
- Pumula (constituency), in eastern Zimbabwe
- Pumula–Luveve, in eastern Zimbabwe

== See also ==
- Pumla
