= 2005 Zimbabwean Senate election =

26 November 2005	2008 →

50 of the 66 seats in the Senate of Zimbabwe
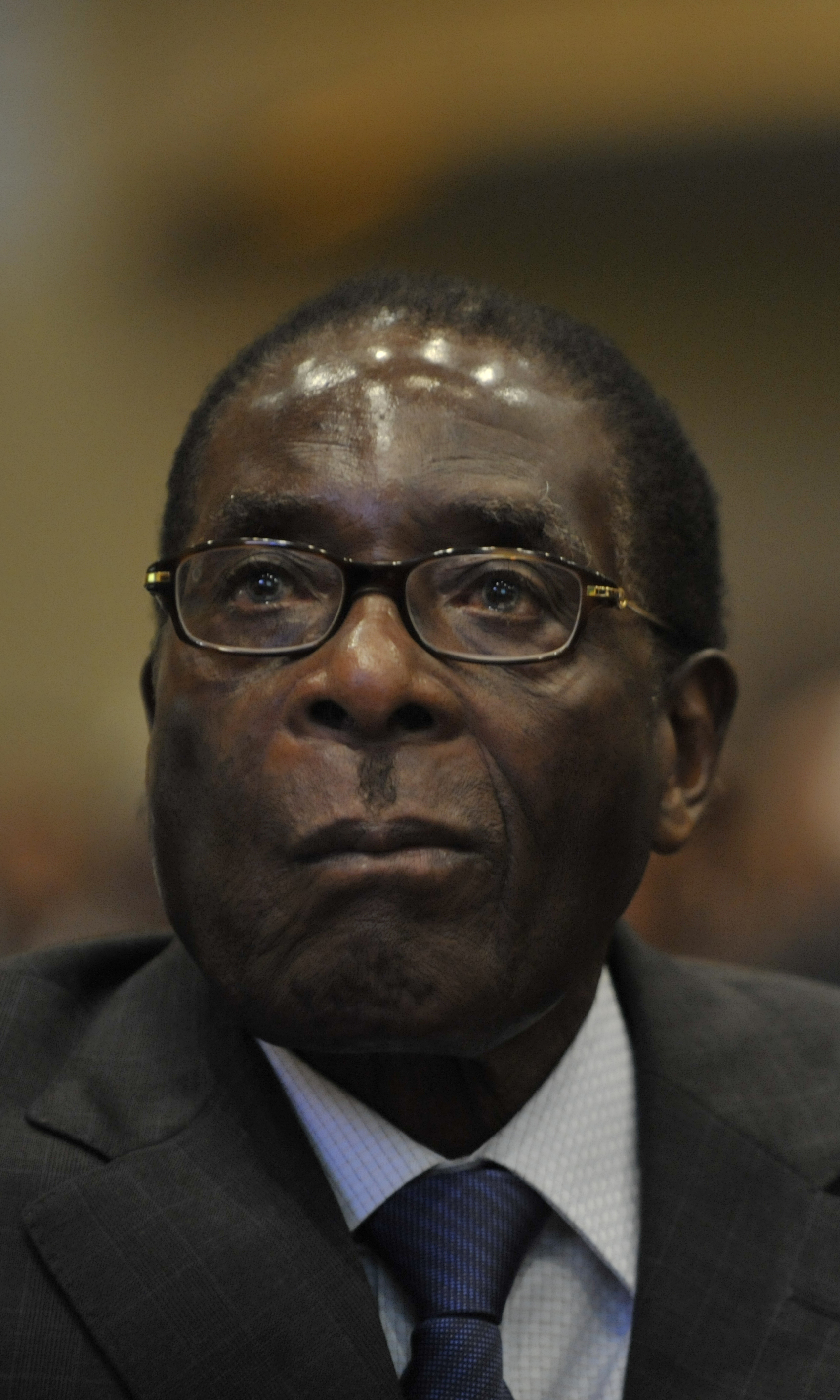

	Majority party	Minority party
Leader	Robert Mugabe	Gibson Sibanda
Party	ZANU–PF	MDC
Seats won	43	7
Popular vote	449,860	123,628
Percentage	73.71%	20.26%

Senate elections were held in Zimbabwe on 26 November 2005 to elect members to the newly formed Zimbabwe Senate. There were a total of 3,239,574 registered voters, out of which 631,347 or 19.5% voted. ZANU-PF won in a landslide election, received over 73% of the popular vote, in what was the nation's first senate elections. The elections were also boycotted by many members of the Movement for Democratic Change as a protest against the suspected election rigging of the 31 March parliamentary election earlier that year, which also saw a low voter turnout of 47.7%.

The decision by some in the MDC to contest the election led to the MDC splitting in two. After the split there was MDC T being led by Morgan Tsvangirai and MDC led by Welshman Ncube.

== Results ==
On 29 November 2005 it was announced that President Mugabe had appointed Kantibhai Patel, Sheila Chipo Mahere, Peter Haritatos, Aguy Clement Georgias, Tazvitya Jonathan Mapfumo and Joshua Teke Malinga as Senators.

Party	Votes	%	Seats
ZANU–PF	449,860	73.71	43
Movement for Democratic Change	123,628	20.26	7
ZANU–Ndonga	11,023	1.81	0
Zimbabwe Youth in Alliance	6,919	1.13	0
Peace Action is Freedom for All	5,278	0.86	0
African National Party	3,585	0.59	0
Zimbabwe African People's Union – Federal Party	213	0.03	0
Multi-Racial Open Party – Christian Democrats	100	0.02	0
Independents	9,689	1.59	0
Chiefs			10
Presidential appointees			6
Total	610,295	100.00	66
Valid votes	610,295	96.67	
Invalid/blank votes	21,052	3.33	
Total votes	631,347	100.00	
Registered voters/turnout	3,239,574	19.49	
Source: African Elections Database

=== By constituency ===
Constituency Electorate and Turnout	Candidate	Party	Votes	%
BULAWAYO PROVINCE
Bulawayo-Makokoba; 88,289 (7.1%)	Sibangilizwe Msipa	MDC	3,947	63.6
Bulawayo-Makokoba; 88,289 (7.1%)	Joshua Teke Malinga	ZANU (PF)	2,258	36.4
Pumula-Luvele; 51,742 (9.1%)	Fanuel Bayayi	MDC	2,876	62.0
Pumula-Luvele; 51,742 (9.1%)	Lot Sitshebo Senda	ZANU (PF)	1,550	33.4
Pumula-Luvele; 51,742 (9.1%)	Jethro Mkwananzi	ZAPU FP	213	4.6
Bulawayo-Nkulumane; 86,392 (8.7%)	Rittah Ndlovu	MDC	4,188	56.1
Bulawayo-Nkulumane; 86,392 (8.7%)	Dumiso Dabengwa	ZANU (PF)	3,276	43.9
Mpopoma-Phelandaba; 46,178 (8.0%)	Greenfield Nyoni	MDC	1,974	54.7
Mpopoma-Phelandaba; 46,178 (8.0%)	Tryphine Nhliziyo	ZANU (PF)	1,638	45.3
Lobengula-Magwegwe; 50,122 (8.2%)	Thabiso Ndlovu	MDC	2,670	65.7
Lobengula-Magwegwe; 50,122 (8.2%)	Joshua Malinga Teke	ZANU (PF)	1,394	34.3
MATABELELAND NORTH PROVINCE
Hwange East; 39,822 (20.3%)	Grace Dube	ZANU (PF)	4,343	54.9
Hwange East; 39,822 (20.3%)	Jabulani Ndlovu	MDC	3,260	41.2
Hwange East; 39,822 (20.3%)	Allen Mpofu	Ind	303	3.8
Tsholotsho-Hwange; 90,535 (14.8%)	Josephine Moyo	ZANU (PF)	7,742	59.4
Tsholotsho-Hwange; 90,535 (14.8%)	Samuel Sipepa Nkomo	MDC	5,301	40.6
Bubi-Mguza; 56,911 (24.0%)	Lot Mbambo	ZANU (PF)	10,823	81.4
Bubi-Mguza; 56,911 (24.0%)	Mabikwa Jacob Thabane	MDC	2,472	18.6
Binga; 58,054 (20.2%)	Herbert Madolo Sinampande	MDC	7,225	63.3
Binga; 58,054 (20.2%)	James Siamende	ZANU (PF)	4,183	36.7
Lupane-Nkayi; 101,976 (25.7%)	Dalumuzi Khumalo	MDC	12,970	50.9
Lupane-Nkayi; 101,976 (25.7%)	Benny Ncube	ZANU (PF)	12,531	49.1
MATABELELAND SOUTH PROVINCE
Beitbridge; 52,336 (23.2%)	Tambudzani Bhudagi Mohadi	ZANU (PF)	9,856	85.1
Beitbridge; 52,336 (23.2%)	Alfred Magama Moyo	MDC	1,729	14.9
Bulilima-Mangwe; 95,911 (19.9%)	Eunice Nomthandazo Sandi	ZANU (PF)	9,310	50.1
Bulilima-Mangwe; 95,911 (19.9%)	Lutho Addington Tapela	MDC	9,289	49.9
Gwanda; 51,939 (28.6%)	Alma Mkhwebu	ZANU (PF)	9,104	62.3
Gwanda; 51,939 (28.6%)	Readus Tlou	MDC	5,507	37.7
Insiza; 45,663 (34.2%)	Naison Ndlovu	ZANU (PF)	10,058	65.9
Insiza; 45,663 (34.2%)	Albert Mkandla	MDC	4,378	28.7
Insiza; 45,663 (34.2%)	Jabulani Dube	Ind	825	5.4
Matobo-Umzingwane; 97,891 (27.8%)	Ananias Sithomi Nyathi	ZANU (PF)	15,776	59.5
Matobo-Umzingwane; 97,891 (27.8%)	David Davy Ndukwana Moyo	MDC	10,723	40.5
MASVINGO PROVINCE
Masvingo; 130,500 (20.8%)	Dzikamai Callisto Mavhaire	ZANU (PF)	20,451	77.8
Masvingo; 130,500 (20.8%)	Hilda Sibanda	MDC	3,174	12.1
Masvingo; 130,500 (20.8%)	Pedzisai Anthony Kundishora	Ind	2,661	10.1
Gutu; 117,295 (39.0%)	Zvinavashe Vitalis Musungwa Gava	ZANU (PF)	36,058	84.3
Gutu; 117,295 (39.0%)	Peter Mukuvaza	ZIYA	6,731	15.7
Chiva-Mwenezi; 143,704 (24.2%)	Samuel Creighton Mumbengegwi	ZANU (PF)	27,750	83.1
Chiva-Mwenezi; 143,704 (24.2%)	Last Chiondegwa	Ind	5,653	16.9
Chiredzi-Zaka; 164,453 (17.7%)	Jephta Johnson Chindanya	ZANU (PF)	22,426	80.9
Chiredzi-Zaka; 164,453 (17.7%)	Abel Ndlovu	PAFA	5,278	19.1
Bikita-Zaka	Anna Rungani	ZANU (PF)	unopposed	
HARARE PROVINCE
MUFAKOSE-KUWADZANA- KAMBUZUMA-DZIVARESEKWA	Sabina Thembani	ZANU (PF)	unopposed	
HARARE-MABVUKU- TAFARA; 158,177 (6.9%)	Livai Chichai Gumbura	ZANU (PF)	8,278	77.5
HARARE-MABVUKU- TAFARA; 158,177 (6.9%)	Frank Charles Chamunorwa	MDC	2,229	20.9
HARARE-MABVUKU- TAFARA; 158,177 (6.9%)	Mathias Matambudziko Guchutu	MROP (CD)	100	0.9
HARARE-MABVUKU- TAFARA; 158,177 (6.9%)	Wilbroad Chawona Kanoti	ZIYA	78	0.7
GLEN VIEW-GLEN NORAH- HIGHFIELD-BUDIRIRO	Charles Zvidzai Tavengwa	ZANU (PF)	unopposed	
CHITUNGWIZA; 145,284 (9.5%)	Rufaro Forbes Edward Magadu	ZANU (PF)	10,653	79.9
CHITUNGWIZA; 145,284 (9.5%)	Shake Maya	MDC	2,673	20.1
HARARE-MBARE- HATFIELD; 145,398 (16.8%)	Vivian Naume Muchicho Mwashita	ZANU (PF)	19,046	80.0
HARARE-MBARE- HATFIELD; 145,398 (16.8%)	Alois Musarurwa Mudzingwa	MDC	4,152	17.4
HARARE-MBARE- HATFIELD; 145,398 (16.8%)	Sipiwe Mupini	ZANU (Ndonga)	258	1.1
HARARE-MBARE- HATFIELD; 145,398 (16.8%)	Mandiveyi Simon Chiduza	Ind	247	1.0
HARARE-MBARE- HATFIELD; 145,398 (16.8%)	Nedi Mike Duro	ZIYA	110	0.5
MASHONALAND WEST PROVINCE
MAKONDE-CHINHOYI	Douglas Mombeshora	ZANU (PF)	unopposed	
KADOMA-SANYATI- NGEZI; 122,488 (20.4%)	Chiratidzo Gava	ZANU (PF)	21,489	88.3
KADOMA-SANYATI- NGEZI; 122,488 (20.4%)	Boniface Vayi Musevenzo	MDC	2,835	11.7
HURUNGWE-KARIBA; 158,761 (16.2%)	Phone Madiro	ZANU (PF)	19,630	78.3
HURUNGWE-KARIBA; 158,761 (16.2%)	Canciwell Nziramasanga	MDC	5,428	21.7
ZVIMBA; 84,413 (24.0%)	Virginia Muchengeti	ZANU (PF)	16,754	85.8
ZVIMBA; 84,413 (24.0%)	Emilly Masimba	MDC	2,777	14.2
CHEGUTU-MANYAME- MHONDORO; 137,167 (15.3%)	Cephas Chikwanha	ZANU (PF)	16,319	80.2
CHEGUTU-MANYAME- MHONDORO; 137,167 (15.3%)	Albert Ndlovu	MDC	4,017	19.8
MASHONALAND EAST PROVINCE
MARONDERA-SEKE	Tracy Mutinhiri	ZANU (PF)	unopposed	
MUREHWA-GOROMONZI	Siriro Majuru	ZANU (PF)	unopposed	
MUDZI-UMP	Oria Kabayanjiri	ZANU (PF)	unopposed	
MUTOKO	Edmond Jacob	ZANU (PF)	unopposed	
CHIKOMBA-WEDZA; 113,213 (21.8%)	Rosemary Goto	ZANU (PF)	20,073	84.8
CHIKOMBA-WEDZA; 113,213 (21.8%)	Egypt Dzinemunhenzva	ANP	3,585	15.2
MASHONALAND CENTRAL PROVINCE
BINDURA-SHAMVA	Betty Chikava	ZANU (PF)	unopposed	
GURUVE	Stefano Mukusha	ZANU (PF)	unopposed	
MOUNT DARWIN-MUZARABANI	Alice Chimbudzi	ZANU (PF)	unopposed	
RUSHINGA-MOUNT DARWIN	Diamond Mumvuri	ZANU (PF)	unopposed	
MAZOWE	Agnes Dete	ZANU (PF)	unopposed	
MIDLANDS PROVINCE
GWERU-SHURUGWI	Tsitsi Muzenda	ZANU (PF)	unopposed	
CHIRUMANZU-KWEKWE- SILOBELA; 139,637 (17.9%)	Clarissa Vongai Muchengeti	ZANU (PF)	20,434	84.2
CHIRUMANZU-KWEKWE- SILOBELA; 139,637 (17.9%)	Isaac Mzimba	MDC	3,826	15.8
GOKWE; 144,621 (23.7%)	Shaddy Sai	ZANU (PF)	26,495	79.8
GOKWE; 144,621 (23.7%)	Lameck Nkiwane Muyambi	MDC	6,691	20.2
GOKWE-ZHOMBE; 145,863 (21.9%)	Leonard Torevaseyi Munotengwa	ZANU (PF)	23,646	76.4
GOKWE-ZHOMBE; 145,863 (21.9%)	Edson John Nyathi	MDC	7,317	23.6
MBERENGWA-ZVISHAVANE	Richard Hove	ZANU (PF)	unopposed	
MANICALAND PROVINCE
BUHERA-MAKONI	Egneti Makono	ZANU (PF)	unopposed	
MAKONI-NYANGA	Stanley Sakupwanya	ZANU (PF)	unopposed	
MUTASA-MUTARE	Mandy Chimene	ZANU (PF)	unopposed	
MUTARE	Marange Henry Chikumbiro	ZANU (PF)	unopposed	
CHIPINGE-CHIMANIMANI; 175,177 (28.3%)	Tobias Matanga	ZANU (PF)	36,516	77.2
CHIPINGE-CHIMANIMANI; 175,177 (28.3%)	Egypt Dzinemunhenzva	ZANU (Ndonga)	10,765	22.8
