= Mangwe (constituency) =

Constituency of the Parliament of Zimbabwe

- Constituency for the National Assembly of Zimbabwe
- Province: Matabeleland South
- Region: Mangwe District

Current constituency
- Seats: 1
- Party: ZANU–PF
- Member(s): Vincent Sihlabo

Mangwe is a constituency represented in the National Assembly of the Parliament of Zimbabwe, located in Mangwe District in Matabeleland South Province. It is currently represented since the 2023 election by Vincent Sihlabo of ZANU–PF.

== History ==
Edward Mkhosi was elected to represent Mangwe in 2005 as the candidate of the Movement for Democratic Change and in 2008 as the candidate of the Movement for Democratic Change – Mutambara. In the 2013 election, Obedingwa Mguni of ZANU–PF was elected to the seat. He was reelected in the 2018 election, but died on 18 June 2019 and was replaced by ZANU–PF's Hlanani Mguni in a 7 September 2019 by-election.

== Members ==
Election	Name	Party
2005	Edward Mkhosi	MDC
2008	Edward Mkhosi	MDC–M
2013	Obedingwa Mguni	ZANU–PF
2018	Obedingwa Mguni	ZANU–PF
2019 by-election	Hlanani Mguni	ZANU–PF
2023	Vincent Sihlabo	ZANU–PF

== See also ==
- List of Zimbabwean parliamentary constituencies
