= Mguni =

Mguni is a Zimbabwean surname. Notable people with the surname include:

- Musawengosi Mguni, a Zimbabwean footballer
- Obedingwa Mguni, a Zimbabwean politician
