= Moses Ndlovu =

Zimbabwean legislator

Moses Mzila Ndlovu
- Born: 1956 or 1957; Bulilima District, Zimbabwe
- Education: Gwelo Teacher's College
- Occupations: Legislator, Teacher, Veteran
- Office: Member of the House of Assembly
- Political party: MDC-T

Moses Mzila Ndlovu is a Zimbabwean legislator and veteran of the 1970s liberation war. He is also a retired teacher and a member of the House of Assembly representing Bulilima West (MDC-M). He has served as Deputy Minister of Foreign Affairs and as Minister of State in the Organ for National Healing, Reconciliation, and Integration.

== Biography ==
Mzila Ndlovu was born in either 1956 or 1957 in Bulilima District, near Zimbabwe's border with Botswana. He grew up in Thekwane village and later graduated as a teacher from Gwelo (now Gweru) Teacher's College. His involvement with the youth league of Zimbabwe African People's Union (ZAPU) began during his time at the teaching college. He became a teacher in various schools in Bulawayo, including Sobukhazi High School. One of his notable students was Believe Gaule (now Senator for Tsholotsho).

During his time at Sobukhazi, Mzila made the pivotal decision to join the Zimbabwe War of Independence, fighting with the ZIPRA, which was the armed wing of ZAPU.

He received military training in the Soviet Union, Cuba, and Angola, eventually becoming a ZIPRA platoon commander operating along the Zambia-Zimbabwe boundaries.

== Transition to civilian life ==
Following the conclusion of the war in 1980, Mzila returned to Zimbabwe, demobilized from the army, and re-entered civilian life. During the period between 1982 and 1987, the country experienced the Gukurahundi genocide, where ZANU targeted dissidence among ex-ZIPRA militants, resulting in massacres of the Ndebele people in their homeland of Matebeleland. Mzila continued to work as a teacher in rural Matebeleland during this time, displaying resilience and survival skills.

He later pursued higher education and became a college lecturer, teaching Sociology of Education at institutions like Hillside Teacher's College, Gwanda ZINTEC (now Joshua Mqabuko Nkomo Polytechnic), and United College of Education (UCE). Mzila's impact extended beyond teaching, as he played a significant role in reforming and strengthening the College Lecturers Association of Zimbabwe (COLAZ), an affiliate of the Zimbabwe Congress of Trade Unions (ZCTU) which influenced the formation of the Movement for Democratic Change (MDC) in 1999.

== Political engagement ==
In the 2000 elections, Mzila contested and won the Bulilimamangwe South Parliamentary seat on an MDC ticket. He played a role in advocating for truth, justice, and reconciliation for victims and perpetrators of the Gukurahundi atrocities. Mzila's consistency in delivering messages of reconciliation led to invitations to speak at various platforms within and outside Zimbabwe.

His leadership within the MDC grew, becoming the chairman for Matebeleland South province, a position that granted him membership in the party's National Executive Committee and National Council.

== Government positions ==
Mzila held various government positions, including Deputy Minister of Foreign Affairs and later Minister of State in the Organ for National Healing, Reconciliation, and Integration (ONHRI). He also engaged in diplomatic efforts to foster socio-cultural ties between Zimbabwean artists and other countries.

== Detentions and advocacy ==
Mzila faced arrests, harassments, and detentions for his activism. In April 2011, he was arrested after attending a church prayer meeting and encouraging attendees to openly discuss their grievances. His leadership style, which involved engaging victims of atrocities, drew the attention of the state and led to various plots against him.

Despite facing challenges and adversity, Mzila's commitment to advocating for justice and reconciliation remained steadfast. He gained prominence as a representative for the victims of the Gukurahundi massacres, addressing audiences through rallies, funerals, church functions, public meetings, and even Parliament.

In 2018, Mzila was denied a visa to visit the United Kingdom to discuss the Gukurahundi massacres at a St. Andrews University event.
