= Brunapeg =

Zimbabwean town

- Location in Zimbabwe
- Coordinates: 21°09′45″S 28°01′40″E
- Country: Zimbabwe
- Province: Matabeleland South
- Districts of Zimbabwe: Mangwe District
- Municipality: Bunapeg Town Council
- Established: 1748

Government
  - Chief: Chief Tjanguluba (Sangulube)
  - Member of Parliament: Edward Mkhosi: MDC
- Elevation: 3,173 ft (967 m)
- Time zone: UTC+2 (CAT)
- Area code: (082)
- Climate: Cwa

Brunapeg is a settlement in the Matabeleland South Province of Zimbabwe. It is one of the urban centres in Mangwe District, one of the seven administrative districts in the province.

== Location ==
Brunapeg is located in the extreme south west of Zimbabwe, close to the international border with Botswana. The town is approximately 107 kilometres (66 mi), by road, southeast of Plumtree, the nearest large town.

Brunapeg is approximately 170 kilometres (106 mi), by road, southwest of Bulawayo, the nearest large city. The geographical coordinates of Brunapeg are: 21°09'45.0"S, 28°01'40.0"E (Latitude:-21.162500; Longitude:28.027778). The town sits at an average elevation of 967 metres (3,173 ft) above mean sea level.

== Overview ==
The town hosts St Annes Roman Catholic Mission. The mission owns and operates St Annes Mission Hospital. The mission was established in 1954. The mission also runs an affiliated nursing school, which graduates approximately 25 nurses every year. The mission also owns and runs a primary school.

== Economy ==
Businesses in the town include gas stations, grocery stores, hardware shops, restaurants, a food distribution center and a post office. The local vegetation supports the growth of Gonimbrasia belina worms. The worms are locally known as Macimbi or Mahonja. They are dark grey and black in color, with a protruding spine, growing up to 6–8 centimetres (2–3 in) in length. The worm feeds on mopane tree leaves, although the diet is not restricted to this tree. The worms are exported to Botswana and some are transported to the city of Bulawayo for distribution throughout Zimbabwe. They are a human food delicacy in most countries of Southern Africa.

== Transport ==
The closest airport is Francistown International Airport, in Francistown, Botswana, approximately 80 kilometres (50 mi), by road, west of Brunapeg.

== Politics ==
Present-day Brunapeg as a singular entity can be seen as fairly liberal, in the 2004 parliamentary election. Fifty eight percent voted for the Movement for Democratic Change. Edward Tshotsho Moyo Mkhosi (MDC) received 10,145 votes; Eunice Nomthandazo Moyo (ZANU-PF) received 5,723 votes. However the MDC lost the largely boycotted Senate election of 2005.

== Neighborhoods ==
Brunapeg has many vibrant neighborhoods. Major villages around the town centre include: 1. Phathisani 2. Newline and 3. Oldline. These neighborhoods are administratively classified as Ward 7 in the Mangwe Rural District Council, under whose jurisdiction Brunapeg lies.

== Demographics ==
Most people in the area are of Kalanga descent, and there is a number of Ndebele and because of its proximity with Botswana there are also Motswana people . There is a sizeable population of labor immigrants from neighboring countries, including South Africa, Botswana, Malawi and Zambia.

== See also ==
- Colleen Bawn
