= Kantibhai Patel =

Indian-born Zimbabwean anti-colonial activist, politician and businessman (1928–2011)

National Hero of Zimbabwe Kantibhai Patel

Senator of Zimbabwe
- In office 2005–2008
- Constituency: Non-constituency
- In office 1985–1990
- Constituency: Non-constituency

Member of the House of Assembly of Zimbabwe
- In office 1991–2000
- Constituency: Non-constituency

Personal details
- Born: Kantibhai Gordhanbhai Patel; 28 October 1928 Dharmaj, Baroda State, British Raj
- Died: 10 September 2011 (aged 82) Johannesburg, Gauteng, South Africa
- Resting place: National Heroes' Acre; Harare, Zimbabwe
- Party: ZANU–PF
- Children: 3

Kantibhai Gordhanbhai Patel (28 October 1928 – 10 September 2011) was an Indian-born Zimbabwean anti-colonial activist, politician, and businessman who served as a senator in the 1980s before serving as a non-constituency Member of Parliament in the 1990s. A member of Zimbabwe's governing party, the ZANU–PF, he served on the party's Central Committee and Politburo. Following his death, he was declared a National Hero of Zimbabwe.

== Early life and education ==
Patel was born on 28 October 1928 into a peasant family in Dharmaj in what is today Gujarat in India. He studied for a Bachelor of Arts at the University of Bombay but did not finish the degree as he moved to Northern Rhodesia (now Zambia) in 1951 where he found employment as a shop assistant for a year. Patel became an activist against the British colonial government and formed a Shop Assistants' Union. After having lost his job and being unemployed for two years, Patel became a teacher at the Greenacre School in Kalomo.

== Political activism and career ==
Patel was involved with the African National Congress of South Africa and later the United National Independence Party of Northern Rhodesia. He was later appointed to the Provincial Race Relations Committee in Kalomo.

Patel moved to Southern Rhodesia (now Zimbabwe) in 1961 where he became a member of the National Democratic Party of Southern Rhodesia (NDP) and later the Zimbabwe African People's Union after the NDP was banned by the white minority government. He was also elected to the executive of the Asian Association. Patel served as the district treasurer of Zapu in the Norton District during the 1960s. He was an organiser of the Mahatma Gandhi Centenary Celebrations in Rhodesia in 1969.

Patel and other members of the Indian community formed the Sarasvati Education Trust to provide scholarships to Black students who were expelled from universities in Rhodesia to study overseas.

Patel was named interim chairman of the ZANU–PF Tongogara Ridgeview branch in 1980. He was later elected as the branch's vice chairman following the branch's establishment. He established the district executive committee of the ZANU–PF Harare Central branch and was named its treasurer. In 1985, Prime Minister Robert Mugabe appointed him as a member of the Zimbabwe Senate. Patel was appointed a non-constituency member of the House of Assembly in 1990. He won a seat on the ZANU–PF Central Committee at the party's congress in 1994 and was reappointed as a Member of Parliament the following year. He was re-elected to the Central Committee in 1999, before being elected to the party's Politburo, its highest decision-making body, in 2004. Following the 2005 Senate election, Patel was appointed one of six non-constituency senators by Mugabe.

Patel was also a member of the board of trustees of the Child Survival and Development Foundation and a member of the board of the 21 February Movement. He served as treasurer of the Zimbabwe–Indian Friendship Association as well.

== Personal life and death ==
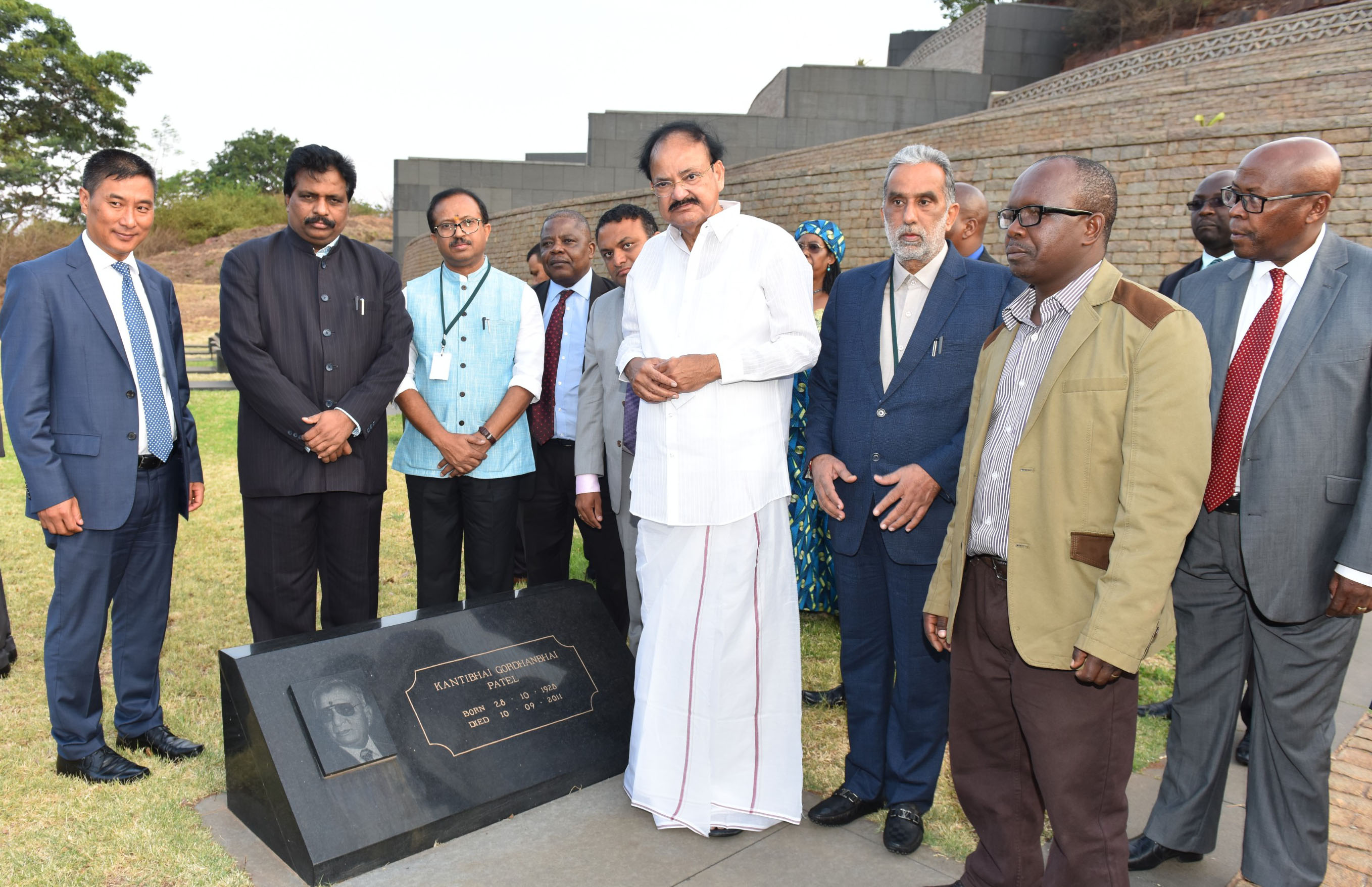
Indian Vice President Venkaiah Naidu visiting the memorial of Patel at the National Heroes' Acre in November 2018.

Patel was married and had three sons. His wife died in 1973.

Patel broke his hip bone and sustained a skull fracture after he fell at his home in Ridgeview in Harare on 25 August 2011. He was treated at The Avenues Clinic in Harare before being transferred to the Linksfield Hospital in South Africa where he died on 10 September 2011. His body was returned to Zimbabwe on 14 September. On the same day, the ZANU–PF Politburo met and unanimously declared him a National Hero of Zimbabwe, the highest civilian honour in the country. Patel's remains were cremated at the Pioneer Cemetery as per Hindu burial rights and some of his ashes were transported to India to be thrown in the Ganges River. The remainder of his ashes were interred at the National Heroes' Acre during the National Heroes' Day commemorations in August 2012.

== See also ==
- Indians in Zimbabwe
