= Bulilimamangwe District =

Zimbabwean district

Coordinates: 20°33′S 27°50′E

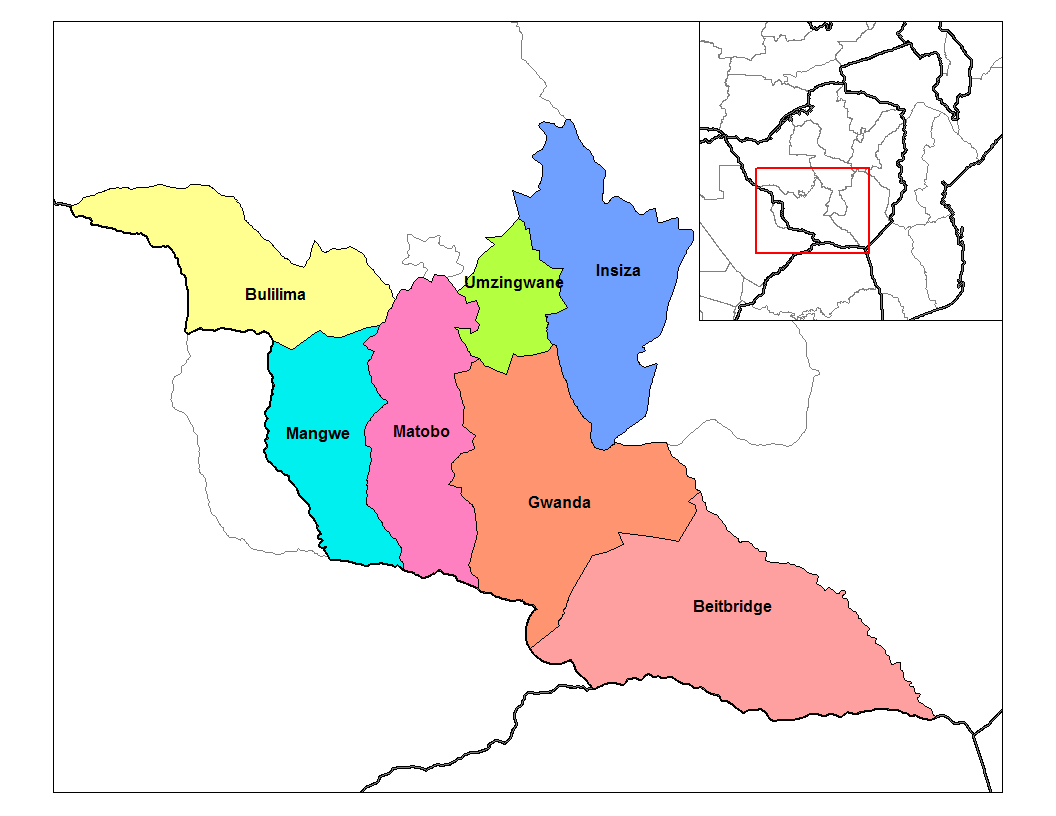
A map of the districts of Matabeleland South

Bulilimamangwe District was a former district in Zimbabwe. In 2003 it was subdivided into three districts: Bulilima District, Mangwe District and Plumtree Town. At the time of its dissolution the area had a population of just under 300,000.

== Location ==
The district was located in Matabeleland South Province, in southwestern Zimbabwe, close to the international border with Botswana. Its main town, Plumtree, is located about 100 kilometres (62 mi), by road, southwest of Bulawayo, the nearest large city.

== Overview ==
Bulilimamangwe is the name which was used long ago before the year 2000. The current districts are Bulilima and Mangwe separated by the railway line which cuts across Plumtree Town. The district headquarters were located in Plumtree, a border town with an estimated population of 2,150 as of 2004.

== See also ==
- Districts of Zimbabwe
- Provinces of Zimbabwe
