= Bulu, Zimbabwe =

Village in Mangwe District

Bulu is a village found in the Mangwe District of Zimbabwe. The village is separated from Ngwizi by the main road coming from Plumtree. The closest hospital to Bulu is Brunaburg and the closest police station is Mphoengs.

== Education ==
Bulu has one secondary school, Bulu High and one primary school Bulu Primary. Based on 2020 academic results, Bulu Primary was ranked second best, coming behind Alan Redfern Primary which is located in Plumtree.
