= Pumula–Luveve =

Constituency of the Parliament of Zimbabwe

- Former constituency for the National Assembly of Zimbabwe
- Region: Bulawayo
- Major settlements: Pumula–Luveve

Former constituency
- Abolished: 2008

Pumula–Luveve was a constituency of the National Assembly of the Parliament of Zimbabwe located in the city of Bulawayo in eastern Zimbabwe.

== History ==
The constituency was abolished for the 2008 Zimbabwean general election, and replaced with the constituencies of Pumula and Luveve.

== Members ==
Parliament	Name	Party	Notes
6th Parliament of Zimbabwe	Esaph Mdhlongwa	MDC Alliance	

== See also ==
- List of parliamentary constituencies of Zimbabwe
