= Luveve =

Suburb of Bulawayo, Zimbabwe

Luveve is a high-density suburb or township of Bulawayo, Zimbabwe. It was established in 1935, and was named after the Ndebele nickname for naive commissioner Colonel C L Carbutt.

It formed the core of the parliamentary seats of Luveve (constituency) and later Emakhandeni–Luveve.
