= Achyut Yagnik =

Indian journalist, academic and activist (1946–2023)

- Born: Jayendra Jani; 1 February 1946; Dharmaj, Kaira district, Bombay Province, British India
- Died: 4 August 2023 (aged 77); Ambawadi, Ahmedabad, Gujarat, India
- Occupations: Journalist, academic, activist
- Spouse: Dr. Bharati Patel
- Children: Anandvardhan Yagnik

Achyut Yagnik (1 February 1946 – 4 August 2023) was an Indian journalist, academic, political analyst and activist based in Ahmedabad, Gujarat.

== Early life ==
Yagnik was born on 1 February 1946, in Dharmaj village in Charotar region (now in Anand district of Gujarat). He was a native of Sojitra. He had studied anthropology in Delhi University but dropped out. He prepared a catalogue of a Sanskrit library as part-time work during his stay in Delhi University. During this period, he came in contact with poet Sundaram, linguist Prabodh Pandit and socialist political leader Ram Manohar Lohia.

== Career ==
In late 1960s, he returned to Ahmedabad and joined Gujarat Samachar where he worked for a decade. From 1970 to 1980, Yagnik worked as a journalist. He worked closely with several poets and writers as well as sociologists and historians during this period. He became specifically interested in medieval Gujarati literature. He edited a Gujarati magazine called Gurjar Bharati. In 1981, he became a founder editor of a Gujarati research journal called Arthat published by Centre for Social Studies, Surat. He served as the correspondent of the Economic and Political Weekly and the state coordinator of the Lokayan project of the Centre for the Study of Developing Societies as well as the state general secretary of the People's Union for Civil Liberties from 1982 to 1984. He opposed the anti-reservation agitations of Gujarat in 1981 and 1985.

In 1982, he founded the Setu - Center for Social Knowledge and Action in Ahmedabad which worked for the marginalised communities. He served it as head for the rest of his life. He worked with the Maldhari community of Gir. Medha Patkar worked for SETU and during that time became the leader of Narmada Bachao Andolan. He worked for the tribals under Vishamata Nirmulan Samiti. He also founded Forum 21 with lawyer Girish Patel.

Yagnik taught at the Centre for Development Communication of Gujarat University for about 10 years. He also taught journalism students at Bhavan’s College in Ahmedabad. He was a Fellow of and Consultant to the United Nations University in 1986-87. He also served as a Fellow of the Hebrew University of Jerusalem in 2005-06.

In 1995, he wrote a book on Ram Janmabhoomi movement. In 2005 and 2011, he published works on history of Gujarat and Ahmedabad respectively.

== Personal life and death ==
His wife Bharati Patel is a retired professor from B. J. Medical College, Ahmedabad. His son Anandvardhan Yagnik is a lawyer in the Gujarat High Court.

Achyut Yagnik died following a cardiac arrest at his home in Ambawadi, Ahmedabad, on 4 August 2023. He was 77. Yagnik was cremated in V. S. Antimdam.

== Works ==
- Yagnik, Achyut; Sheth, Suchitra (2005). The Shaping of Modern Gujarat: Plurality, Hindutva, and Beyond. Penguin Books India. ISBN 978-0-14-400038-8.
- Yagnik, Achyut (2 February 2011). Ahmedabad: From Royal city to Megacity. Penguin UK. ISBN 978-81-8475-473-5.
- Yagnik, Achyut; Bhatt, Anil H. (1983). The Anti-Dalit (Untouchable) Agitation in Gujarat. Minority Strategies, Perspectives on Racism & Untouchability.
- Ashis Nandy, Shikha Trivedy, Shail Mayaram, Achyut Yagnik (2006). Creating a nationality: the Ramjanmabhumi movement and fear of the self. Oxford India paperbacks (Fifth impression ed.). New Delhi: Oxford University Press. ISBN 978-0-19-564271-1.
