= Pumla =

Pumla is a given name and may refer to:

- Pumla Gobodo-Madikizela (born 1955), research professor at the University of the Free State in South Africa
- Pumla Kisosonkole (1911–1997), Ugandan politician and activist in women's organizations
- Makaziwe Mandela (born Pumla Makaziwe Mandela-Amuah, 1954), daughter of Nelson Mandela and Evelyn Mase

== See also ==
- Pumula
