= Dharmaj =

Dharmaj ધર્મજ
- Village
- Location in Gujarat, India Dharmaj (India)
- Country: India
- State: Gujarat
- District: Anand
- Taluka: Petlad

Government
  - Type: Gram panchayat

Area
  - Total: 14.6111 km^{2} (5.6414 sq mi)

Population (2011)
  - Total: 10,429
  - Density: 713.77/km^{2} (1,848.7/sq mi)

Languages
  - Official: Gujarati
- Time zone: UTC+5:30 (IST)
- PIN: 388430
- Telephone code: 02697

Dharmaj (Gujarati: ધર્મજ) is a village in Petlad taluka of Anand district in the Indian state of Gujarat. Located in the Charotar region of central Gujarat, it had a population of 10,429 according to the 2011 Census of India.

Dharmaj is particularly noted for the extensive international migration of its residents and the continuing relationship between the village and its overseas diaspora. Academic research has examined Dharmaj as an example of a transnational village in which migration, return visits and diaspora networks have influenced local social and economic life.

== History ==
=== Traditional accounts of Dharmaj's origins ===
Local traditions concerning the origins of Dharmaj predate the settlement of the Patidar community. According to traditions recorded by community histories, a Rabari pastoralist named Dharma settled near Khadiyari Talavadi when the surrounding area was largely forested. The tradition holds that Dharma discovered a lingam after observing a cow repeatedly release milk at the same location. He subsequently established a small shrine at the site, which became known as Dharmeshwar Mahadev. The name Dharmaj is traditionally attributed to Dharma. Community accounts describe Brahmin and Garasia inhabitants as among the early residents of the settlement.

Patidar settlement in Dharmaj is traditionally associated with Narsinhbhai, also rendered Narshibhai, Patel, who migrated from Jargal and established what became known as Juni Khadki ("old quarter"), around present-day Sardar Chowk. Community histories differ on the precise Vikram Samvat year associated with his arrival and therefore on its corresponding Gregorian date.

A second major phase of Patidar settlement is traditionally dated to Vikram Samvat 1732 (approximately 1675 CE), when Rangaji Patel migrated to Dharmaj from Virol, near Sojitra. His descendants became a large component of Dharmaj's Patidar population and were associated with four additional traditional quarters: Vachli Khadki, Kadujini Khadki, Kakani Khadki and Athamni Khadki. Together with Juni Khadki, these formed the five traditional Patidar khadkis of Dharmaj.

=== Migration and modern development ===
Dharmaj developed as an agricultural settlement in the fertile Charotar region. Community histories associate its nineteenth-century prosperity particularly with agriculture and tobacco cultivation.

Overseas migration subsequently became a defining feature of Dharmaj. Migration from the village followed broader patterns of Gujarati and Patidar migration to East Africa, and later to the United Kingdom and other countries. By the twentieth century, overseas migration had created extensive transnational family and community networks linking Dharmaj with Africa, Britain and, subsequently, North America, Australia and New Zealand.

== Geography and administration ==
Dharmaj is situated in Petlad taluka in the Charotar region of central Gujarat. The village covers approximately 1,461 hectares (14.61 km²).

The Census of India identifies Dharmaj as a village within Petlad sub-district of Anand district. Local government is administered through a gram panchayat.

Dharmaj is one of the six villages traditionally associated with the Patidar community's Chha Gaam grouping, together with Bhadran, Karamsad, Nadiad, Sojitra and Vaso. Academic research has described these settlements as historically prominent villages within the Charotar Patidar social and marriage network.

== Demographics ==
According to the 2011 Census of India, Dharmaj had a population of 10,429. The population consisted of 5,380 males and 5,049 females living in 2,232 households.

Agriculture continued to account for a substantial portion of employment in and around the village at the time of the 2011 census.

== Patidar community ==
Dharmaj has a longstanding association with the Patidar community of the Charotar region. It forms part of the traditional Chha Gaam ("six villages") network. The six villages developed interconnected kinship and marriage networks and historically occupied a prominent position among Charotar Patidars.

The internal geography of the Patidar settlement was historically organized around the five khadkis described in local community histories: Juni Khadki, Vachli Khadki, Kadujini Khadki, Kakani Khadki and Athamni Khadki.

== Diaspora ==
International migration has had a substantial influence on Dharmaj's modern development. Academic research on the village describes Dharmaj as part of a transnational social field linking residents with migrants and descendants of migrants living overseas.

Early migration from Dharmaj followed routes between Gujarat and East Africa. During the twentieth century, families originating in Dharmaj established communities in East African countries and later in the United Kingdom, particularly as Gujaratis relocated from East Africa during and after the period of decolonization. Subsequent migration established communities of people with Dharmaj origins in the United States, Canada, Australia, New Zealand and elsewhere.

The London Borough of Brent records that the Dharmaj Society of London was established in 1968–69, principally by people originating from Dharmaj who had migrated to Britain from Kenya. The organization was established to maintain social and cultural connections within the community and developed charitable activities in both Britain and Dharmaj.

In 2018, organizations in Dharmaj began an effort to map the worldwide population of people originating from the village and their descendants.

== Diaspora and village development ==
Overseas residents and organizations have financed or supported infrastructure, education, healthcare and other projects in Dharmaj. By the 2000s, diaspora contributions had supported schools, medical facilities, drinking-water infrastructure and recreational amenities.

Projects supported by non-resident Gujaratis have included medical facilities and a reverse-osmosis drinking-water plant.

The scale of overseas financial connections has led Indian media to characterize Dharmaj as an NRI village. In 2014, banks in Dharmaj reportedly held more than ₹1,000 crore in deposits associated with non-resident Indians. At the time, the village reportedly had 13 banks despite a resident population of approximately 11,000.

Academic research has also examined the uneven social effects of transnational engagement. Bhamidipati's study of Dharmaj found that diaspora networks and return visits strengthened connections between migrants and village residents while also reinforcing the status of the Patidar diaspora and deepening some existing social divisions.

== Dharmaj Day ==
Dharmaj hosts an annual homecoming event known as Dharmaj Day, which brings together village residents and members of the overseas diaspora. The event is held on 12 January, coinciding with National Youth Day and the birth anniversary of Swami Vivekananda.

Dharmaj Day developed as a means of maintaining relationships between the village and members of its diaspora and introducing younger generations of overseas families to their ancestral village. Activities have included village tours, cultural programs, community gatherings and recognition of members of the wider Dharmaj community.

Dharmaj Day has also been the subject of academic research into diaspora and transnationalism. Bhamidipati describes it as a homecoming event emerging from return visits by migrants and as a transnational social field connecting migrants with residents of Dharmaj. The study found that the event strengthens transnational networks and enables participants to maintain connections with their ancestral village, while also reflecting differences in status and influence within the community.

== Economy ==
Agriculture has historically been an important component of Dharmaj's economy, reflecting its location in the agricultural Charotar region.

The village has also received attention for the development of communal grazing land. By 2015, approximately 115 acres of previously barren gauchar land had reportedly been converted into productive grassland and plantations containing more than 3,000 fruit-bearing trees. The project produced fodder, generated income for the village and provided local employment. The Gujarat government subsequently introduced the Dharmaj Gauchar Sudharna Yojna to encourage similar land-restoration projects elsewhere.

Banking and remittances associated with the overseas population have also become notable features of the local economy.

== Education and healthcare ==
Education and healthcare in Dharmaj have been influenced by local charitable organizations and contributions from residents and members of the diaspora.

Dharmaj Kelavani Mandal, established in 1943, administers educational institutions in the village and has participated in efforts to maintain links with the global Dharmaj community.

By the early twenty-first century, the village had developed English-medium educational facilities and a range of medical services with support from charitable organizations and overseas donors. Contemporary reporting described educational facilities with laboratories and boarding facilities as well as medical facilities providing a variety of specialist services.

== Social issues ==
Research on Dharmaj has examined how the benefits of transnational migration and diaspora involvement interact with existing social structures in the village. Bhamidipati found that the transnational networks surrounding Dharmaj and Dharmaj Day have been particularly associated with the Patidar community and can simultaneously strengthen connections between migrants and residents while reinforcing existing differences in status and influence.

In 2015, Dalit residents alleged intimidation by members of the locally dominant Patidar community during village elections. The Times of India reported that many Dalit families temporarily left their homes during the dispute and that residents alleged that they had been intimidated over the exercise of their voting rights.

== Notable people ==
- H. M. Patel (1904–1993), civil servant and politician who served as India's Minister of Finance and Minister of Home Affairs.
- Kantibhai Patel (1928–2011), Indian-born Zimbabwean anti-colonial activist, politician and businessman.
- Achyut Yagnik (1946–2023), journalist, academic and activist.
- Rajan Patel, engineer and social entrepreneur who helped start Embrace, a nonprofit that developed low-cost infant warmers for use in resource-constrained settings.

== See also ==
- Anand district
- Charotar
- Gujarati diaspora
- Patidar
