= Obedingwa Mguni =

Zimbabwean politician (1962–2019)

Obedingwa Mguni (1 December 1962 – 18 June 2019) was a Zimbabwean politician who was a member of parliament representing the Mangwe constituency from 2013 to 2019.

== Background ==
He was Deputy Minister of Home Affairs in Zimbabwe (2015–2017), and the 9th Parliament of Zimbabwe’s ZANU PF Parliamentary Deputy Chief Whip. He was also ZANU PF's Provincial Treasurer in Mat. South. He was also the chair of Democratisation, Good Governance and Human Rights in Southern African Development Community (SADC) Parliament. Born on 1 December 1962, he was married to Hlalani Mguni (M. 1993) and together they had three children Doris, Bongani and Simphiwe.

== Political career ==
Mguni took part in the Rhodesian Bush War between 1975 and 1980. From Empandeni he went to Zambia where he attended Mkushi College before he went to Libya for guerrilla training. In 1980 he was demobilised and began teaching until 1986, before he went to South Africa where he joined the South African government. He was a businessman from 2005 to 2019.

== Other career achievements ==
While in South Africa he worked in SARS: Customs and Excise, beginning as a customs officer until he became the National compliance manager. He was the national chair and a youth coordinator at the Guta Ra Mwari congregation, South Africa, from 2003 to 2013, he then became the international chair at the Guta Ra Mwari congregation from 2014 to 2019. He was the founder of Madlala soccer and netball tournaments held annually in Mangwe as well as the Rural International Women's Day celebrations held annually in Mangwe.

== Education ==
- Primary : Matole & Silima Primary Schools, Empandeni, Mkushi (Zambia)
- Secondary : Matopo & St Asngas (RSA)
- Tertiary: CACC & Witwatersrand University – BA Degree in Economics and Financial management
- Any Other Form of Training: Project Management, Leadership, Small Enterprises Development, Customs & Excise, Military Training

== Death ==
Obedingwa Mguni died after three days of illness, caused by a combination of pneumonia and type 2 diabetes, in West end Clinic in Harare on 18 June 2019, after collapsing while in the Parliament Clinic and being rushed to West end clinic in an ambulance.
