= Zimbabwe Heroes' Day =

Public holiday in Zimbabwe

- The national flag of Zimbabwe
- Observed by: Zimbabwe
- Type: National
- Celebrations: Flag Hoisting, Parades, Singing Patriotic Songs, Speech by the President of Zimbabwe.
- Date: Second Monday of August
- Frequency: Annual

Zimbabwe Heroes' Day, also referred to as National Heroes Day, is a public holiday in Zimbabwe that is observed on the second Monday in August each year in honor of Zimbabwe's liberation war heroes and heroines.

== History ==
Zimbabwe war for liberation also known as Chimurenga or Rhodesian Bush War lasted more than 15 years and estimate of over 10,000 guerrilla fighters died and over 20,000 civilians were killed during the battle.

== Celebrations ==
The main ceremonies to commemorate the day are held at the country's National Heroes Acre in Harare where notable deceased liberation war fighters who are afforded the title of National Hero are buried. People come to lay down wreaths on the graves and the reigning president of Zimbabwe comes to pay his respects. A musical concert titled Heroes Day Gala is held featuring several artists who perform throughout the night on the day and the event will be free to access for the public. The galas are usually held at the National Sports Stadium which is situated opposite the hero's grave site and is broadcast live on ZBC TV. In 2021 the 41st edition of the Heroes Day was commemorated virtually because of the COVID-19 pandemic social distancing regulations, the president addressed the country at state house and the gala was held virtually as artists performed on television only. Zimbabwe Heroes Day is celebrated along with the Zimbabwe Defense Forces Day whereby the country celebrates its defense forces including the ground force army and airforce army. Defense Forces Day is on the next day after Heroes Day and the national army's tactics will be displayed to the public as entertainment. During these two days, schools will be closed and some businesses will not be operating.

== See also ==
- Public holidays in Zimbabwe
