= Plumtree, Zimbabwe =

Zimbabwean town

Plumtree
- Town
- Location in Zimbabwe
- Coordinates: 20°28′41″S 27°47′50″E
- Country: Zimbabwe
- Province: Matabeleland South
- District: Bulilimamangwe District
- Municipality: Plumtree Town Council

Government
  - Mayor: Eroc Garcia
- Elevation: 1,374 m (4,508 ft)

Population (2022 census)
  - Total: 14,459
- Time zone: UTC+02:00 (CAT)
- Climate: Cwa

Plumtree is a town in Zimbabwe. Marula trees, wild plum trees (Ntungulu in tjiKalanga), grow abundantly in the area. The town was once called Getjenge by baKalanga. It is also often called Titji, meaning station, and referring to the railway station which was operating in the area around 1897.

== Location ==
The town is located in Bulilimamangwe District, in the Matabeleland South Province, in southwestern Zimbabwe, at the international border with Botswana. It is located about 100.6 kilometres (62.5 mi) by road, southwest of Bulawayo, the nearest large city. Plumtree sits on the main road between Bulawayo in Zimbabwe and Francistown in Botswana, about 94 kilometres (58 mi), further southwest from Plumtree. The geographical coordinates of Plumtree are: 20°28'41.0"S, 27°47'50.0"E (Latitude:-20.478056; Longitude:27.797222). The border is defined by the Ramokgwebana River. The village of Ramokgwebana is opposite Plumtree on the Botswana side. Plumtree lies at an average elevation of 1,374 metres (4,508 ft) above mean sea level.

== Overview ==
It is the local administrative centre for Mangwe District, which consists of two sub-districts; namely (a) Mangwe Urban (Plumtree) and (b) Mangwe Rural. What was Bulilima West, is now Bulilima District. (see:Map of the Districts of Matabeleland South Province)

At an altitude of 1,374 metres (4,508 ft) above sea level, the town sits on the watershed between the Limpopo River basin to the south and the Zambezi River basin to the north. The Tati River rises near Plumtree, running west and then south into the Shashe River, a tributary of the Limpopo. The annual rainfall is about 500 millimetres (20 in), with a long dry season from April to October.

The railway from Bulawayo to Francistown crosses the border near Plumtree. There is a functioning casino in Plumtree. There are several elementary and secondary schools in the town. Radio and television reception from within Zimbabwe is weak in this neighborhood. Residents in Plumtree and neighboring communities rely on reception from neighboring Botswana and South Africa for news and general information.

== Population ==
There are two main languages spoken in Plumtree; (a) tjiKalanga and (b) isiNdebele. Other languages spoken to a lesser extent include seTswana, used near the Botswana border. In 2004, the population of the town was estimated at 2,184. The 2012 national population census enumerated the population of Plumtree at 11,660 inhabitants. Of these, 6,261 (53.7 percent) were females and 5,399 (46.3 percent) were males. They were grouped into 3,273 households with an average size of 3.6 family members.

== Climate ==
Climate data for Plumtree, Zimbabwe (1961–1990)
Month	Jan	Feb	Mar	Apr	May	Jun	Jul	Aug	Sep	Oct	Nov	Dec	Year
Mean daily maximum °C (°F)	28.1 (82.6)	27.5 (81.5)	27.4 (81.3)	26.2 (79.2)	24.1 (75.4)	21.7 (71.1)	21.6 (70.9)	24.5 (76.1)	28.2 (82.8)	29.7 (85.5)	29.0 (84.2)	28.0 (82.4)	26.3 (79.3)
Mean daily minimum °C (°F)	16.9 (62.4)	16.5 (61.7)	15.7 (60.3)	13.6 (56.5)	10.8 (51.4)	8.4 (47.1)	8.3 (46.9)	10.5 (50.9)	13.8 (56.8)	15.9 (60.6)	16.7 (62.1)	16.6 (61.9)	13.6 (56.5)
Average rainfall mm (inches)	120.2 (4.73)	114.0 (4.49)	70.0 (2.76)	35.9 (1.41)	6.8 (0.27)	2.7 (0.11)	1.3 (0.05)	0.7 (0.03)	8.8 (0.35)	32.5 (1.28)	90.7 (3.57)	118.8 (4.68)	602.4 (23.72)
Average rainy days	10	9	5	3	1	0	0	0	1	4	8	10	51
Source: World Meteorological Organization

== Notable people linked to Plumtree ==
- Malusi Gigaba
- Pommie Mbangwa
- Alfred Taylor
- Zwelibanzi Moyo Williams

== See also ==
- Kalanga people
- Economy of Zimbabwe
- Districts of Zimbabwe
- Provinces of Zimbabwe
