= Jabulani Dube =

Zimbabwean politician

Jabulani Dube (died May 29, 2013) was a Zimbabwean politician. He was the MP-elect for Insiza South.
