= Vitalis Zvinavashe =

Former Zimbabwean military officer and politician

General Vitalis Zvinavashe

Commander of the Zimbabwe Defence Forces
- In office July 1994 – December 2003
- President: Robert Mugabe
- Preceded by: Solomon Mujuru
- Succeeded by: Constantino Chiwenga

Personal details
- Born: 23 September 1943 Southern Rhodesia
- Died: 11 March 2009 (aged 65) Manyame Military Hospital
- Resting place: National Heroes' Acre
- Party: ZANU-PF (until 2008)
- Spouse: Margaret Zvinavashe
- Occupation: Politician, Nationalist
- Profession: Soldier, Military Commander
- Nickname: Fox-Gava

Military service
- Allegiance: Zimbabwe
- Branch/service: Zimbabwe National Army; Zimbabwe African National Liberation Army
- Rank: General

Vitalis Musungwa Gava Zvinavashe (27 September 1943 – 10 March 2009) was a Zimbabwean general officer, politician and the first commander of the Zimbabwe Defence Forces "ZDF". Zvinavashe had modest academic credentials but was renowned among Zimbabwe’s military circles as a strategist.

During Zimbabwe's war of independence Vitalis Zvinavashe operated under the nom de guerre Shebba Gava and served as a senior commander within the Zimbabwe African National Liberation Army (ZANLA).He held a frontline operational command role, participating in and coordinating guerrilla activities during the later stages of conflict. As part of ZANLA's wartime command structure, Shebba Gava was involved in organising combat units, overseeing operation discipline, and sustaining military pressure against Rhodesian security forces in the period leading up to independence 1980.

Following Zimbabwe’s independence, Vitalis Zvinavashe was involved in regional security cooperation among the Frontline States during Southern Africa’s post-liberation transition. A former frontline commander in the Zimbabwean liberation struggle, Zvinavashe transitioned into senior command within the Zimbabwe Defence Forces, where he played a role in coordinating military and security cooperation with neighbouring states.

During this period, Zimbabwean forces were engaged in supporting regional stability efforts, including cooperation with Mozambique in the aftermath of its independence, particularly in securing transport corridors and countering cross-border destabilisation. Zimbabwe also formed part of the Frontline States’ collective support for liberation movements and regional security initiatives directed against apartheid-era South Africa, contributing to pressure that preceded South Africa’s political transition in the early 1990s.

Scholars of Southern African security have noted that Zimbabwe’s military during the 1980s and early 1990s was regarded as one of the more professional post-liberation armed forces in the region, reflecting its conventional military capability and role within regional security cooperation frameworks.

== Military career ==
He joined the Rhodesian Bush War in 1967 and went for military training in Chunya Camp in Tanzania in 1968.

In 1977, he was elected as a ZANU-PF Central Committee member and deputy chief of national security and intelligence.

He was appointed commander of Three Brigade in Mutare at independence in 1980 before becoming the country’s first Zimbabwe Defence Forces (ZDF) commander in July 1994 assuming overall command over the army and the Air Force under a new military structure. He oversaw various peacekeeping missions in the Southern African Development Community (SADC) region.

In the Second Congo War, he was in charge of the SADC allied task force troops led by Zimbabwe which fought rebels backed by Uganda and Rwanda to topple the now slain DRC leader Laurent Kabila. The deployment of the Zimbabwean troops later led to the allegations of plunder of natural resources, especially diamonds, in which Zvinavashe was implicated. Claims that Zvinavashe personally benefited from mineral exploitation during the Congo conflict have not been substantiated by verifiable evidence. His role in the war was that of senior military command, operating within Zimbabwe's stated regional security objectives rather than in any documented commercial capacity.

In 2002, Zvinavashe was associated with senior military statement warning that the armed forces would not support political leaders who sought to reverse the gains of Zimbabwe's independence or undermine national sovereignty. The statement did not explicitly restrict leadership to liberation war veterans, but emphasised continuity with the objective of the liberation struggle. Following his retirement in December 2003, General Constantino Chiwenga succeeded him to the post.

He was placed on the European Union and United States sanctions lists in 2003 and remained on the lists until his death.

== Post-retirement and death ==
In the 2008 parliamentary election, he ran on the ZANU-PF ticket for the Gutu district in the Senate, but lost to Empire Makamure of the MDC. He told other ZANU-PF candidates on April 23 that they needed to "accept the reality" that the MDC had won, and he stressed that the importance of preserving peace. He blamed Mugabe for the ZANU-PF candidates' defeat, saying that the people of Masvingo had rejected Mugabe and that the parliamentary candidates suffered as collateral damage.

He had just returned from Cuba where he had gone to seek medical assistance for liver cancer when he died at Manyame Air Base hospital on March 10, 2009. He is survived by his wife Margaret and 12 children.
