= Mudzi East =

Zimbabwean parliamentary constituency

Mudzi East is a parliamentary constituency in Mashonaland, Zimbabwe. In 2005 it was one of the three constituencies in Mudzi district, the other two being Mudzi West and Mudzi Central (Mudzi constituency). Mudzi East is a rural area.

== 2005 election irregularities ==
In the 2005 election, 800 polling officers had been turned away after being labelled MDC sympathisers. The Election Commission announced that 12,499 people voted. However, 22,420 votes were registered, leaving unexplained where the extra 9,921 votes came from. Ray Kaukonde, the Zanu PF candidate, won with 17,999 votes, representing 144% of the original voters. The allegation was that ballot-box stuffing increased his original 8,078 votes.
