= Joshua Mqabuko Nkomo Polytechnic =

Higher education institution in Gwanda, Zimbabwe

- Former names: Gwanda Zintec College
- Established: 1981
- Affiliations: Ministry of Higher and Tertiary Education, Zimbabwe
- Principal: Dr.Ngoni Mhule Moyo
- Academic staff: 45
- Students: 1625
- Location: Gwanda, Matabeleland South, Zimbabwe; 20.952883°S 29.012175°E
- Website: https://jmnpoly.ac.zw/

Location of Joshua Mqabuko Nkomo Polytechnic in Matabeleland South

Joshua Mqabuko Nkomo Polytechnic is a state higher education institution in Gwanda, Zimbabwe, offering Diploma in Education.

The Government of Zimbabwe plans major investment into the polytechnic, which will allow it to start offering degrees and resolve the accommodation shortage for students.

The planned Gwanda State University shall be hosted by the Polytechnic whilst construction takes place.
