= Tinos Rusere =

Zimbabwean politician (1945–2007)

Tinos Rusere (May 10, 1945 – March 1, 2007) was a Zimbabwean miner and trade union activist. During the Second Chimurenga he recruited members of ZANLA and he was later elected as a Zimbabwe African National Union - Patriotic Front member to the Parliament of Zimbabwe. At the time of his death he was Deputy Minister for Mines and Environment.

Rusere was born in Nechaziva Village in the Zaka District in what was then Victoria province of Southern Rhodesia. He went to the Maraire and St James schools where he passed the 'Standard Six' exams in 1962. He was active in politics first in the Zimbabwe African Peoples Union, but joined the breakaway to the Zimbabwe African National Union in 1963.

He went to work as a learner miner in 1967, at the Arcturus mine in Goromonzi for six years, but then left to go to South Africa in 1974. While working in the South African mines he became active in trade unions and was elected as representative of the Rhodesian miners, nicknamed "Rhodesian Induna". In 1977 he became inDuna for all Southern African countries and, having sided with Robert Mugabe in joining the Patriotic Front, toured round the countries neighbouring Rhodesia to recruit people to fight in the Zimbabwe African National Liberation Army.

When Zimbabwe achieved independence, Rusere returned and obtained a job with the City of Harare government. He was a superintendent in the Department of Works for seven years. In 1987 he became a mining engineer with the company of Comp Air, resigning in 1994 to start his own business, Charuma Blasting and Building Company.

Remaining in touch with politics, Rusere was elected in the Zimbabwean election of 2000 as Member of Parliament for Zaka East. He served in the government from 2005 first as Deputy Minister for Rural Resources and Water Development, and then as Deputy Minister for Mines and Environment.

In 2003, he was put on the United States sanctions list and remained subject to U.S. sanctions until his death.

Rusere died on March 1, 2007, of kidney failure and appendix problems.
