= Mangwe District =

Coordinates: 20°57′S 27°59′E

- Second-level administrative subdivision
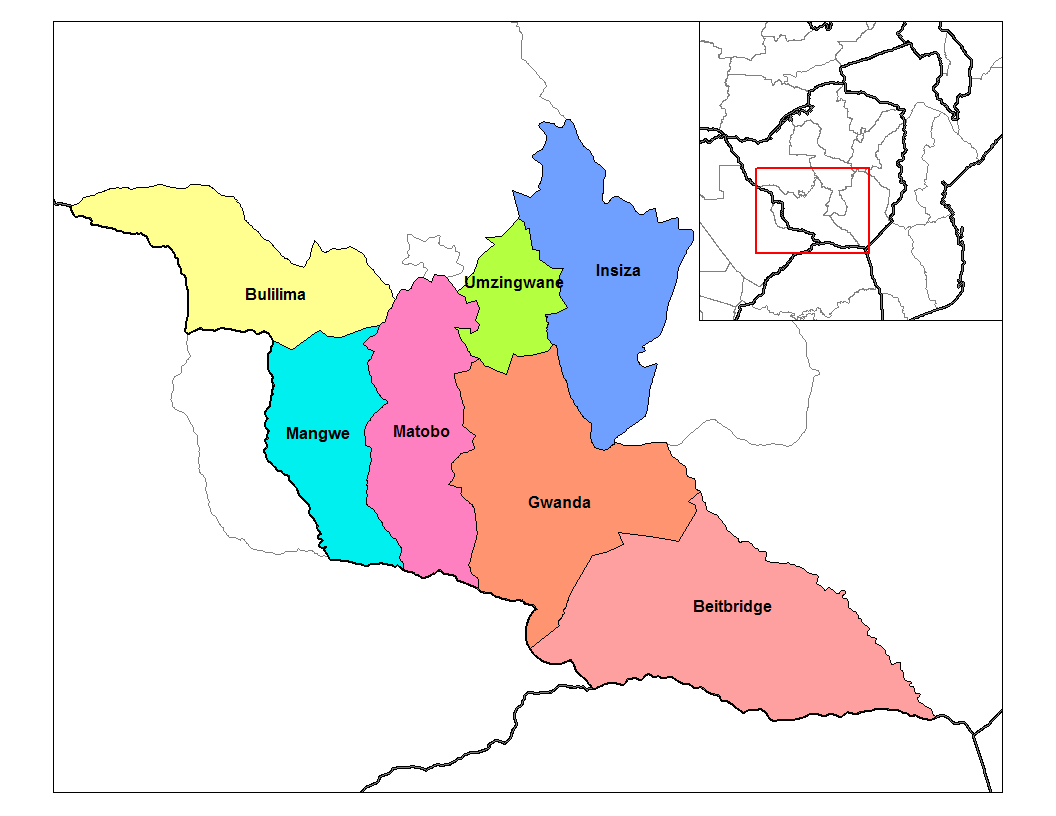
- A map of the districts of Matabeleland South
- Country: Zimbabwe
- Province: Matabeleland South
- Time zone: UTC+2 (CAT)
  - Summer (DST): UTC+2 (CAT)

Mangwe District is a district of the Province Matabeleland South in Zimbabwe. It is divided into 17 wards. Some of the wards are Ngwizi, Mphoengs, Sanzukwi, Sangulube, Maninji, Madabe, Mbakwe, Empandeni, Mayobodo, Mambale, Makorokoro, Tshitshi, and Marula. Some villages found in this district are Bulu, Kweneng, Togotsweu. Mangwe used to be a part of bigger district which was known as Bulilimamangwe. Bulilimamangwe was then divided into 3 districts now known as Mangwe, Bulilima and Plumtree.

== Demographics ==
According to the Zimbabwe Census of 2022, Mangwe District has a total population of 65,562 people. The population distribution amongst the 17 wards found in Mangwe District is shown below:

Ward	Male Population	Female Population	Total Population
Ward 1	1800	2082	3882
Ward 2	1844	2113	3957
Ward 3	2167	2547	4714
Ward 4	2459	2809	5268
Ward 5	1827	1935	3762
Ward 6	2558	3002	5560
Ward 7	1402	1671	3073
Ward 8	1111	1145	2256
Ward 9	1004	1238	2242
Ward 10	2108	2404	4512
Ward 11	1583	1139	2722
Ward 12	1274	1322	2596
Ward 13	1602	1753	3355
Ward 14	1004	1086	2090
Ward 15	2761	2937	5698
Ward 16	2610	3108	5718
Ward 17	1953	2294	4157
Total Population	31 067	34 495	65 562

== Education ==
In Mangwe District there are about 45 primary schools and 15 secondary schools. The top 10 Primary schools found in the district listed according to their 2020 Grade 7 Performance are:

Rank	School	Passrate
1	Alan Redfern	80.56 %
2	Bulu	75.00 %
3	Dingumuzi	73.82 %
4	Marula	68.89 %
5	Tjingababili	65.79 %
6	Matshamhlophe	65.38 %
7	Mambale	64.15 %
8	Izimnyama	59.09 %
9	Dukwe	58.82 %
10	Madabe	56.76 %

== Health ==
Mangwe has 13 health facilities: three hospitals and ten clinics. Of the 13 health facilities, four are mission owned whilst the rest belong to the government.

== Business Centres ==
There are 15 business centres in Mangwe,
