= Gutu (senatorial constituency) =

Senatorial constituency in the Senate of Zimbabwe

- Former Senatorial constituency for the Parliament of Zimbabwe
- Region: Masvingo
- Population: 118,201

Former constituency
- Created: 2008
- Abolished: 2013
- Seats: 1

Gutu was a constituency represented in the Senate of Zimbabwe. It covered most of the Gutu district in Masvingo Province, and was one of six senatorial constituencies in the province.

The equivalent seats in the House of Assembly were:

- Gutu North
- Gutu South
- Gutu East
- Gutu West
- Gutu Central

In the 2008 election, the constituency elected MDC member Empire Makamure as senator, defeating General Vitalis Zvinavashe. Afterwards during the recount, Zvinavashe told other ZANU-PF candidates on 23 April that they needed to "accept the reality" that the MDC had won, and he stressed that the importance of preserving peace. He blamed Mugabe for the ZANU-PF candidate's defeat, saying that the people of Masvingo had rejected Mugabe and that the parliamentary candidates suffered as collateral damage.

2008 general election
| Candidate | Party | Votes | % |
|---|---|---|---|
| Empire Makamure | MDC-T | 28,975 | 53.01 |
| Vitalis Zvinavashe | ZANU-PF | 23,638 | 43.24 |
| Tapuwa Mudyahoto | Independent | 2,050 | 3.75 |
| Total | | 54,663 | 100.00 |
| Registered voters/turnout | | 118,201 | – |
Source: Kubatana.net
