= Bulilima District =

Coordinates: 20°14′S 27°39′E

- Second-level administrative subdivision
- Interactive map of Bulilima District
- Country: Zimbabwe
- Province: Matabeleland South

Area
  - Total: 6,439 km^{2} (2,486 sq mi)

Population (2022 census)
  - Total: 85,600
  - Density: 13.3/km^{2} (34.4/sq mi)
- Time zone: UTC+1 (CET)
  - Summer (DST): UTC+1 (CEST)

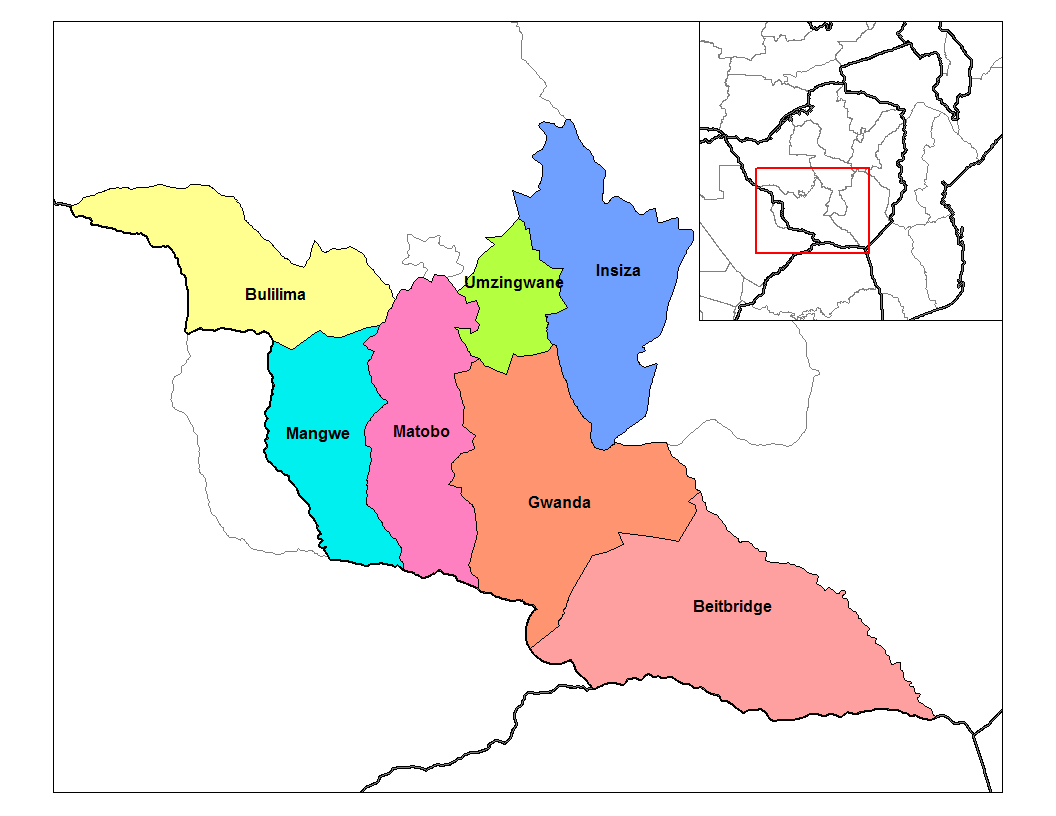
Map of the districts of Matabeleland South province of Zimbabwe. Created by Rarelibra 18:33, 28 September 2006 (UTC) for public domain use, using MapInfo Professional v8.5 and various mapping resources.

Bulilima District is a district of the Province Matabeleland South in Zimbabwe. It was created in 2003 with the break-up of Bulilimamangwe District.
